= Scientific Atheist Library =

Nauchno-ateisticheskaya biblioteka (Russian: Научно-атеистическая библиотека / Naučno-ateističeskaja biblioteka), Scientific Atheist Library is an academic atheistic Soviet series of books which was published from 1955 to 1990. It was founded at Vladimir Bonch-Bruyevich's initiative and printed by various publishing houses. It brought out Marxist classics on religion and atheism. Until 1965, it was published by the Publishing House of the Academy of Sciences of the USSR (Nauka), and from 1969 onward by the Mysl publishing house. Published volumes are (titles in English translation):

== Volumes ==
- Lucian – Selected Atheistic Works – 1955
- Arkady Lakomkin – Science and Religion on the Origin of Man – 1956
- Ilya Furman – Our Earth – 1956
- Sergey Benkliev – The Origin and Essence of Christianity – 1956
- Denis Diderot – Selected Atheistic Works – 1956
- Paul-Henri Thiry d’Holbach – Letters to Eugenia. Common Sense – 1956
- Georgi Plekhanov – On Religion and the Church – 1957
- Sylvain Maréchal – Selected Atheistic Works – 1958
- Titus Lucretius Carus – On the Nature of Things – 1958
- Uriel da Costa – On the Mortality of the Human Soul and Other Works – 1958
- Abram Ranovich – On Early Christianity – 1959
- Ivan Skvortsov-Stepanov – Selected Atheistic Works – 1959
- Ulrich von Hutten – Dialogues. Journalism. Letters – 1959
- Nikolay Dobrolyubov – On Religion and the Church – 1960
- Voltaire – God and Human Beings – 1961
- Samuil Lozinsky (ru) – History of the Papacy – 1961
- Constantin Volney – Selected Atheistic Works – 1962
- Matvey Gukovsky (comp. & ed.) – Italian Humanists of the 15th Century on the Church and Religion – 1963
- Moisei Belenky (ru) (ed.) – Critique of the Jewish Religion – 1962
- Iosif Kryvelev (comp.) – The Origin of the Bible – 1964
- Nadezhda Krupskaya – From the Atheist Legacy – 1964
- Anatoly Lunacharsky – Why One Cannot Believe in God (s) – 1965
- Vladimir Lenin – On Atheism, Religion, and the Church – 1969
- Figures of the October Revolution on Religion and the Church – 1969
- The Paris Communards on Religion and the Church – 1971
- Anatoly Lunacharsky – On Atheism and Religion – 1972
- Vladimir Bonch-Bruyevich – Selected Atheistic Works – 1973
- Natural Scientists and Atheism – 1973
- Charles de Brosses – On Fetishism – 1973
- Critique of Religious Sectarianism – 1974
- Nikolay Nikolsky – Selected Works on the History of Religion – 1974
- Religion and the Church in the History of Russia – 1975
- A. I. Herzen on Atheism, Religion, and the Church – 1976
- Figures of the International Workers’ Movement on Religion and the Church – 1976
- Bernard de Fontenelle – Reflections on Religion, Nature, and Reason – 1979
- English Freethought: J. Locke, J. Toland, A. Collins – 1981
- Percy Bysshe Shelley – The Triumph of Life – 1982
- D. I. Pisarev on Atheism, Religion, and the Church – 1984
- The Petrashevsky Circle on Atheism, Religion, and the Church – 1986
- K. Marx and F. Engels on Atheism, Religion, and the Church – 1986
- A. N. Radishchev and the Decembrists: From the Atheistic Legacy of the First Russian Revolutionaries – 1986
- The “Baptism of Rus'” in the Works of Russian and Soviet Historians – 1988
- Apocrypha of the Early Christians: Research, Texts, Commentaries – 1989
- Pyotr Lavrov – On Religion – 1989

An other Soviet book series was the Biblioteka ateističeskoj literatury (Библиотека атеистической литературы), the Library of Atheistic Literature.

== See also ==
- Marxist–Leninist atheism

== Literature ==
- James Thrower: Marxist-Leninist 'Scientific Atheism' and the Study of Religion and Atheism in the USSR. (Religion and Reason, 25). 1983
