= Christ myth theory =

Fringe theory claiming that Jesus did not exist

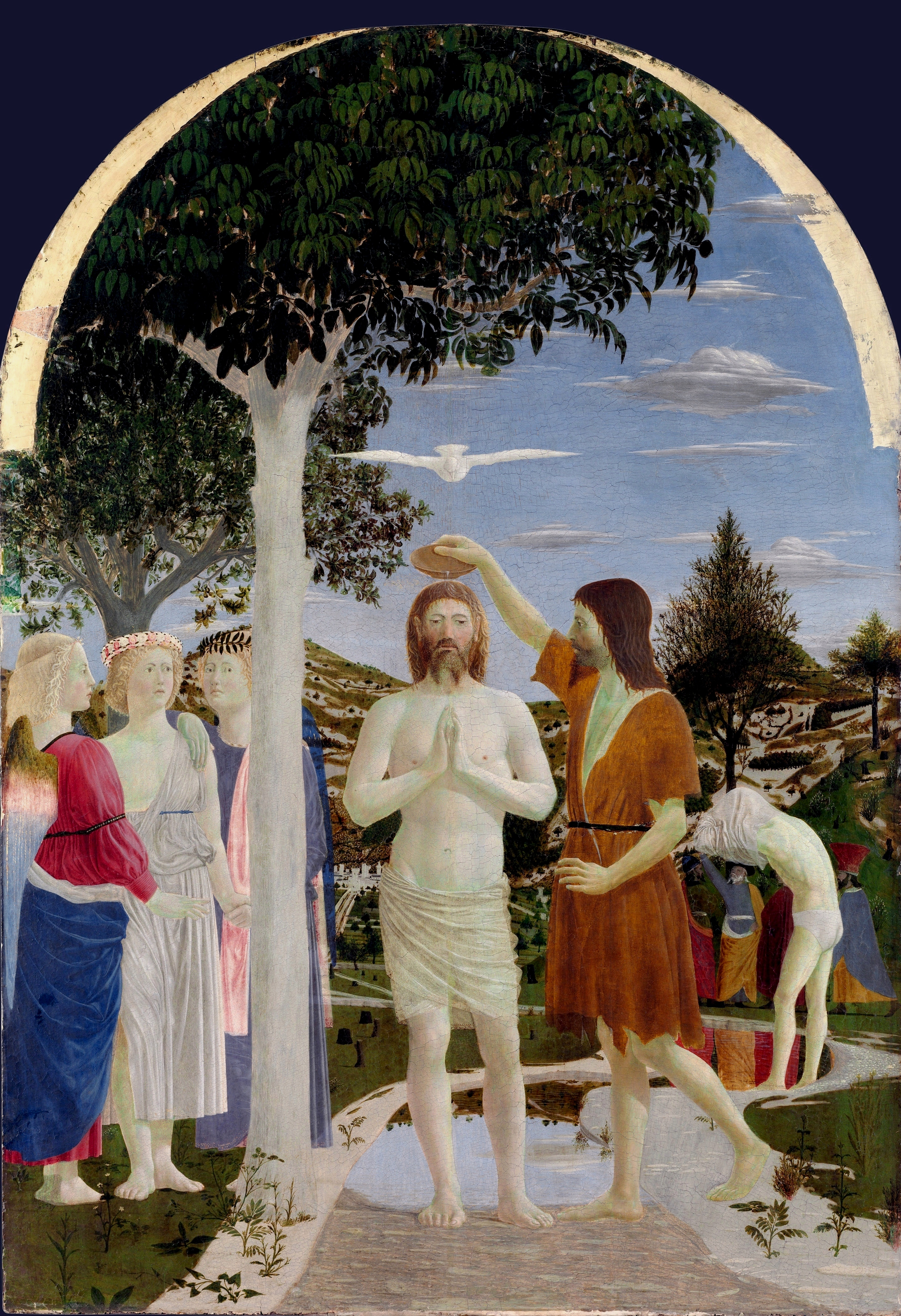
- The Christ myth theory rejects the mainstream consensus that Jesus was a historical person who was baptised and later executed. (The Baptism of Christ by Piero della Francesca, painted c. 1448–1450)
- Early proponents: Charles-François Dupuis (1742–1809); Constantin-François Volney (1757–1820); Richard Carlile (1790–1843); Bruno Bauer (1809–1882); Edwin Johnson (1842–1901); Dutch Radical School (1880–1950); Albert Kalthoff (1850–1906); William Benjamin Smith (1850–1934); John Mackinnon Robertson (1856–1933); Thomas Whittaker (1856–1935); Arthur Drews (1865–1935); Paul-Louis Couchoud (1879–1959)
- Later proponents: Alvin Boyd Kuhn (1880–1963); George Albert Wells (1926–2017); Tom Harpur (1929–2017); Michael Martin (1932–2015); Thomas L. Brodie (1940-2026)
- Living proponents: Earl Doherty (b. 1941); Robert M. Price (b. 1954); Richard Carrier (b. 1969)
- Subjects: Historical Jesus, historical reliability of the Gospels, historicity of Jesus

The Christ myth theory, also known as the Jesus myth theory, Jesus mythicism, or the Jesus ahistoricity theory, (Note: Gullotta (2017, p. 311): "Originally known as the 'Christ Myth theory,' this school of thought has more recently adopted the moniker 'Jesus Myth theory' or 'mythicism'.") is the fringe (Note: The Christ myth theory is regarded as a fringe theory in mainstream scholarship: Larry Hurtado (December 2, 2017), Why the "Mythical Jesus" Claim Has No Traction with Scholars: "The "mythical Jesus" view doesn't have any traction among the overwhelming number of scholars working in these fields, whether they be declared Christians, Jewish, atheists, or undeclared as to their personal stance. Advocates of the "mythical Jesus" may dismiss this statement, but it ought to count for something if, after some 250 years of critical investigation of the historical figure of Jesus and of Christian Origins, and the due consideration of "mythical Jesus" claims over the last century or more, this spectrum of scholars have judged them unpersuasive (to put it mildly)."; Gullotta 2017, p. 312: "[Per Jesus mythicism] Given the fringe status of these theories, the vast majority have remained unnoticed and unaddressed within scholarly circles."; Patrick Gray (2016), Varieties of Religious Invention, chapter 5, Jesus, Paul, and the birth of Christianity, Oxford University Press, p.114: "That Jesus did in fact walk the face of the earth in the first century is no longer seriously doubted even by those who believe that very little about his life or death can be known with any certainty. [Note 4:] Although it remains a fringe phenomenon, familiarity with the Christ myth theory has become much more widespread among the general public with the advent of the Internet."; Michael Grant (2004), Jesus: An Historian's Review of the Gospels, p.200: "In recent years, 'no serious scholar has ventured to postulate the non-historicity of Jesus' or at any rate very few, and they have not succeeded in disposing of the much stronger, indeed very abundant, evidence to the contrary."; Bart Ehrman (2012), Did Jesus Exist?, p.20: "It is fair to say that mythicists as a group, and as individuals, are not taken seriously by the vast majority of scholars in the fields of New Testament, early Christianity, ancient history, and theology. This is widely recognized, to their chagrin, by mythicists themselves."; Raphael Lataster (2019), Questioning the Historicity of Jesus: Why a Philosophical Analysis Elucidates the Historical Discourse, BRILL, p. 1: "One common criticism is that we are on the fringes of scholarship."; Robert M. Price, The Pre-Nicene New Testament: Fifty-Four Formative Texts (Salt Lake City: Signature Books, 2006) p. 1179: "New Testament criticism treated the Christ Myth Theory with universal disdain." Price, a Christian atheist who denies the existence of Jesus, agrees that this perspective runs against the views of the majority of scholars; Robert M. Price "Jesus at the Vanishing Point" in The Historical Jesus: Five Views edited by James K. Beilby & Paul Rhodes Eddy, 2009 InterVarsity, ISBN 0830838686 p. 6.; Earl Doherty "When The Jesus Puzzle was published in 1999, the theory that no historical Jesus ever lived was still generally regarded as fringe...for almost two centuries, it had achieved little traction among the public or in New Testament scholarship."Doherty 2009, pp. vii) view that the story of Jesus is a work of mythology with no historical substance. (Note: Bromiley 1982, p. 1034: "... the story of Jesus is a piece of mythology [possessing no] substantial claims to historical fact".) Alternatively, in terms given by Bart Ehrman paraphrasing Earl Doherty, it is the view that "the historical Jesus did not exist. Or if he did, he had virtually nothing to do with the founding of Christianity." (Note: (Ehrman 2012, pp. 12, 347, n. 1): "[Per] Jesus mythicism, Earl Doherty, defines the view as follows: it is "the theory that no historical Jesus worthy of the name existed, that Christianity began with a belief in a spiritual, mythical figure, that the Gospels are essentially allegory and fiction, and that no single identifiable person lay at the root of the Galilean preaching tradition." [Earl Doherty (2009), Jesus: Neither God nor Man: The Case for a mythical Jesus (Ottawa, ON: Age of Reason Publications), vii–viii.] In simpler terms, the historical Jesus did not exist. Or if he did, he had virtually nothing to do with the founding of Christianity.")

The mainstream scholarly consensus, developed in the three quests for the historical Jesus, holds that there was a historical Jesus of Nazareth who lived in first-century AD Roman Judea, but his baptism and crucifixion are the only facts of his life about which a broad consensus exists. (Note: Basic assent about baptism and crucifixion: Dunn 2003, p. 339 states of baptism and crucifixion that these "two facts in the life of Jesus command almost universal assent."; Crossan 1995, p. 145: That he was crucified is as sure as anything historical can ever be, since both Josephus and Tacitus [...] agree with the Christian accounts on at least that basic fact."; Levine 2006, p. 4: "There is a consensus of sorts on a basic outline of Jesus' life. Most scholars agree that Jesus was baptized by John, debated with fellow Jews on how best to live according to God's will, engaged in healings and exorcisms, taught in parables, gathered male and female followers in Galilee, went to Jerusalem, and was crucified by Roman soldiers during the governorship of Pontius Pilate (26-36 CE). But, to use the old cliché: the devil is in the details."; Komoszewski & Bock 2019, pp. 22–23 "...a considerable number of specific facts about Jesus are so well supported historically as to be widely acknowledged by most scholars, whether Christian (of any stripe) or not:...(lists 18 points)...Nevertheless, what can be known about Jesus with a high degree of confidence, apart from theological or ideological agendas, is perhaps surprisingly robust."; Evans & Wright 2009, p. 3: "No serious historian of any religious or nonreligious stripe doubts that Jesus of Nazareth really lived in the first century and was executed under the authority of Pontius Pilate, the governor of Judea and Samaria. Though this may be common knowledge among scholars, the public may well not be aware of this.") Beyond that, mainstream scholars have no consensus about the historicity of other major aspects of the gospel stories, nor the extent to which they and the Pauline epistles may have replaced the historical Jesus with a supernatural Christ of faith. (Note: No consensus about the historicity of the other major details of the gospel stories, or on the extent to which the Pauline epistles and the gospels replaced the historical human Jesus with a religious narrative of a supernatural "Christ of faith": Beilby & Rhodes Eddy 2009, pp. 38–39: "Contrary to previous times, virtually everyone in the field today acknowledges that Jesus was considered by his contemporaries to be an exorcist and a worker of miracles. However, when it comes to historical assessment of the miracles tradition itself, the consensus quickly shatters. Some, following in the footsteps of Bultmann, embrace an explicit methodological naturalism such that the very idea of a miracle is ruled out a priori. Others defend the logical possibility of miracle at the theoretical level, but, in practice, retain a functional methodological naturalism, maintaining that we could never be in possession of the type and/or amount of evidence that would justify a historical judgment in favor of the occurrence of a miracle. Still others, suspicious that an uncompromising methodological naturalism most likely reflects an unwarranted metaphysical naturalism, find such a priori skepticism unwarranted and either remain open to, or even explicitly defend, the historicity of miracles within the Jesus tradition."; Vermes 2001, ch.8 "By the end of the first century Christianity had lost sight of the real Jesus and of the original meaning of his message. Paul, John and their churches replaced him by the otherworldy Christ of faith."; Ehrman 2012, pp. 13, 298, 334–335: "The problem with the historical Jesus for Schweitzer was that he was in fact all too historical. That is, Jesus was so firmly rooted in his own time and place, that he does not translate to modern idiom. The Jesus proclaimed by preachers and theologians today had no existence. That particular Jesus is (or those particular Jesuses are) a myth. But there was a historical Jesus, who was very much a man of his time."; Ehrman 2012, pp. 268–270: "As I have repeatedly emphasized, different scholars come to radically different conclusions about how to understand the life of the historical Jesus...Nearly all critical scholars agree at least on those points about the historical Jesus. But there is obviously a lot more to say, and that is where scholarly disagreements loom large - disagreements not over whether Jesus existed but over what kind of Jewish teacher and preacher he was."; Levine 2006, pp. 1: "No single picture of Jesus has convinced all, or even most, scholars; all methods and their combinations find their critics as well as their advocates."; Doherty 2009, pp. vii: "Mainstream critical scholarship's ongoing quest for "the historical Jesus" is yet to arrive at any secure or consensus result. Agreement on what Jesus said and did, on whether he was a Jewish Wisdom teacher, an apocalyptic prophet, a revolutionary, a Cynic-style sage, or any of a number of other characterizations is far from being achieved as at any previous stage of the perennial attempt to separate the glorified Jesus of faith from the elusive Jesus of history."; Price 2000, p. 34: "The historical Jesus has gotten lost behind the stained glass curtain of the Christ of dogma".; Watson 2001, p. 168: "All this suggests that the relationship between Christian faith and historical research is to be seen as an ongoing critical dialogue about Jesus and his significance. There is no pre-established harmony between the two sides, and the hope for an eventual consensus is in current circumstances utopian. But neither is this a purely negative relationship of absolute antagonism or indifference. The dialogue may at least serve to clarify why it is that for some Jesus is one of the prophets, whereas for others he is the Christ. Each side in the dialogue remains an unresolved problem to the other—and, as such, an opportunity to learn something new."; Dunn 2005, p. 80: "When Christians tried to make the Messiahship of Jesus credible in their sermons and then in epistles and gospels, they always made use of two kinds of evidence: personal testimony to his resurrection, based on experience, and the witness of the Scriptures. As the living Lord he was for them the Messiah of the Old Covenant. Therefore we, too, speak of the historic Christ of the Bible."; Komoszewski & Bock 2019, p. 23: "To look at the situation from the other end, all of the generally accepted facts about Jesus are consistent with the church's beliefs about Jesus. That is, there is not a single well-evidenced historical fact about Jesus that undermines the "orthodox" view of Jesus."; (Ehrman 2014); (Stanton 2002, pp. 143ff))

Proponents of mythicism, in contrast, argue that a historical Jesus never existed, and that the gospels historicized a mythological character. (Note: Proponents broadly argue that a historical Jesus never existed: Gullotta 2017, p. 311: "In the eighteenth and nineteenth centuries, Constantin-François Volney, Charles François Dupuis, and Bruno Bauer all advocated for the theory that Jesus did not exist as a historical person. While their arguments failed to convince the academy, their questions have persisted and inspired a new movement within North America, which also argues that Jesus did not exist. Originally known as the 'Christ Myth theory,' this school of thought has more recently adopted the moniker 'Jesus Myth theory' or 'mythicism'"; Price 2000, p. 17: "Generations of Rationalists and freethinkers have held that Jesus Christ corresponds to no historical character: There never was a Jesus of Nazareth. We might call this categorical denial "Jesus atheism"; Price 2011, pp. 18–19: "G. A. Wells, like his predecessors advocating the Christ Myth theory, discounted the gospel story of an historical Jesus [...] implying that there was no Jesus tradition floating around in either oral or written form at the time Paul and Peter were writing letters") (Note: "obscured by myths and dogma": Price 2000, p. 17: "What I am describing is something different, a "Jesus agnosticism". There may have been a Jesus on earth in the past, but the state of the evidence is so ambiguous that we can never be sure what this figure was like or, indeed, whether there was such a person."; Price 2000, p. 34: "The historical Jesus has gotten lost behind the stained glass curtain of the Christ of dogma."; Price 2000, p. 518: "It doesn't prove there was no historical Jesus, for it is not implausible that a genuine, historical individual might become so lionised, even so deified, that his life and career would be completely assimilated to the Mythic Hero Archetype. But if that happened, we could no longer be sure there had ever been a real person at the root of the whole thing."; Wells 2013, p. 19 leaves open the question regarding Paul's Christ "as to whether such a person had in fact existed and lived the obscure life that Paul supposed of him." According to Wells, "There is no means of deciding this issue.") This view can be traced back to the late 18th century, when critical study of the New Testament commenced; it was revived in the 1970s. Most mythicists employ a threefold argument: they question the reliability of the Pauline epistles and the gospels to establish Jesus's historicity; they argue that information is lacking on Jesus in secular sources from the first and early second centuries; and they argue that early Christianity had syncretistic and mythological origins as reflected in both the Pauline epistles and the gospels, with Jesus being a deity who was concretized in the gospels. (Note: (Eddy & Boyd 2007, p. 202): "While New Testament scholars agree that Paul has relatively little to say about the life and ministry of Jesus, most grant that Paul viewed Jesus as a recent contemporary. The most extreme legendary-Jesus theorists, however—particularly the Christ myth theorists—deny this. They argue that nothing in Paul's letters indicates that he believed Jesus was a contemporary of his. Rather, they contend, the Jesus of Paul's theology is a savior figure patterned after similar figures within ancient mystery religions. According to the theory, Paul believed that Christ entered the world at some point in the distant past—or that he existed only in a transcendent mythical realm—and died to defeat evil powers and redeem humanity. Only later was Jesus remythologized [i.e. historicized] as a Jewish contemporary.") (Note: (Carrier 2014, p. 53): "At the origin of Christianity, Jesus Christ was thought to be a celestial deity much like any other. ... Like some other celestial deities, this Jesus was originally believed to have endured an ordeal of incarnation, death, burial and resurrection in a supernatural realm [not on Earth].")

The non-historicity of Jesus has never garnered significant support among scholars. (Note: Larry Hurtado (December 2, 2017 ), Why the "Mythical Jesus" Claim Has No Traction with Scholars) Mythicism is rejected by virtually all mainstream scholars of antiquity, (Note: Criticisms of mythicism: Gullotta 2017 "In short, the majority of mythicist literature is composed of wild theories, which are poorly researched, historically inaccurate, and written with a sensationalist bent for popular audiences." "Criticized for being Euro-centric and male-centric, these holistic-comparative theories have been almost universally rejected by scholars of folklore and mythology..."; Casey 2014, pp. 243–245 "I therefore conclude that the mythicist arguments are completely spurious from beginning to end. They have been mainly put forward by incompetent and unqualified people. Most of them are former fundamentalist Christians who were not properly aware of critical scholarship then, and after conversion to atheism, are not properly aware of critical scholarship now. They frequently confuse any New Testament scholarship with Christian fundamentalism."; Marina (2022) states that Carrier's work is guided by his ideological agenda and lacks positive evidences from primary sources and notes that his mythicist views have not won any supporters from critical scholars to date; Ehrman 2012; Ehrman 1999, p. 248; Ehrman 2011, p. 285; Van Voorst 2003, pp. 659–660; Hansen 2022 "The theory of a pre-Christian Jesus, while exceptionally intriguing, still has not found any decent footing in recent years. Though there have been some attempts at innovating the concept, invariably the arguments for this have relied heavily on conjectural interpretations of biblical and extrabiblical literature in an attempt to validate the hypothesis. The arguments tend to rely on specious interpretations of the ancient texts, various conjectures, and, in Price's case, a reliance on outdated and long-since disproven concepts. All of these issues, and more, demonstrate that the pre-Christian Jesus hypothesis is still an unreliable thesis, and likely should be discounted as it was a century ago. The renovated theories fail to convincingly explain the evidence at hand.") and has been considered a fringe theory for more than two centuries, but has attracted more attention in popular culture with the rise of the internet.

== Traditional and modern approaches on Jesus ==
Mainstream scholarship asserts that there was a historical Jesus. However, scholars differ about the accuracy of the biblical accounts about Jesus, with only two events supported by nearly-universal scholarly consensus: Jesus' baptism, and his crucifixion. The mainstream scholarly view is that the Pauline epistles and the gospels describe the "Christ of faith", presenting a religious narrative which replaced the historical Jesus who did live in first-century Roman Judea. (Note: Vermes 2001, ch.8 "By the end of the first century Christianity had lost sight of the real Jesus and of the original meaning of his message. Paul, John and their churches replaced him by the otherworldy Christ of faith.") Martin Kähler made the famous distinction between the "Jesus of history" and the "Christ of faith", arguing that faith is more important than exact historical knowledge. According to Ehrman, Jesus was a first-century Judean Jew, who was not like the Jesus preached and proclaimed today. (Note: Ehrman 2012, pp. 13, 334–335: "The Jesus proclaimed by preachers and theologians today had no existence. That particular Jesus is (or those particular Jesuses are) a myth. But there was a historical Jesus, who was very much a man of his time.") The most widely held view by critical scholars is that Jesus was an apocalyptic prophet who was subsequently deified.

The origins and rapid rise of Christianity, as well as the historical Jesus and the historicity of Jesus, are a matter of longstanding debate in theological and historical research. While Christianity may have started with an early nucleus of followers of Jesus, within a few years after the presumed death of Jesus in c. AD 33, at the time Paul started preaching, a number of "Jesus-movements" seem to have existed, which propagated divergent interpretations of Jesus' teachings. A central question is how these communities developed and what their original convictions were, as a wide range of beliefs and ideas can be found in early Christianity, including adoptionism and docetism, and also Gnostic traditions which used Christian imagery, which were all deemed heretical by proto-orthodox Christianity.

=== Quest for the historical Jesus ===
A first quest for the historical Jesus took place in the 19th century when hundreds of biographies about Jesus were proposed. German theologian David Strauss (1808–1874) pioneered the search for the "historical Jesus" by rejecting all supernatural events as mythical elaborations. His 1835 work, Life of Jesus, was one of the first and most influential systematic analyses of the life story of Jesus, aiming to base it on unbiased historical research. The Religionsgeschichtliche Schule, starting in the 1890s, used the methodologies of higher criticism, (Note: Duignan, Brian (2016), Religionsgeschichtliche Schule, Encyclopedia Britannica) a branch of criticism that investigates the origins of ancient texts in order to understand "the world behind the text". It compared Christianity to other religions, regarding it as one religion among others and rejecting its claims to absolute truth, and demonstrating that it shares characteristics with other religions. It argued that Christianity was not simply the continuation of the Hebrew Bible, but syncretistic, and was rooted in and influenced by Hellenistic Judaism (Philo) and Hellenistic religions like the mystery cults and Gnosticism. (Note: Kurt Rudolph (1987), Religionsgeschichtliche Schule, Encyclopedia of Religion) Martin Kähler questioned the usefulness of the search for the historical Jesus, making the famous distinction between the "Jesus of history" and the "Christ of faith", arguing that faith is more important than exact historical knowledge. Rudolf Bultmann (1884–1976), who was related to the Religionsgeschichtliche Schule, emphasized theology, and in 1926 argued that historical Jesus research was both futile and unnecessary; however, Bultmann slightly modified that position in a later book. The first quest ended with Albert Schweitzer's 1906 critical review of the history of the search for Jesus' life in The Quest of the Historical Jesus—From Reimarus to Wrede. The first quest was challenged in the 19th and early 20th centuries by authors who denied the historicity of Jesus, notably Bauer and Drews.

The second quest started in 1953, in a departure from Bultmann. Several criteria, the criterion of dissimilarity and the criterion of embarrassment, were introduced to analyze and evaluate New Testament narratives. This second quest declined in the 1970s due to the diminishing influence of Bultmann, and coinciding with the first publications of George Albert Wells, which marks the onset of the revival of Christ myth theories. According to Paul Zahl, while the second quest made significant contributions at the time, its results are now mostly forgotten, although not disproven.

The third quest started in the 1980s and introduced new criteria. Primary among these are the criterion of historical plausibility, the criterion of rejection and execution, and the criterion of congruence (also called cumulative circumstantial evidence), a special case of the older criterion of coherence. The third quest is interdisciplinary and global, carried out by scholars from multiple disciplines and incorporating the results of archeological research. The third quest primarily yielded new insights into Jesus' Palestinian and Jewish context rather than the person of Jesus himself. It also has made clear that all material on Jesus has been handed down by the emerging Church, raising questions about the criterion of dissimilarity, and the suitability of ascribing material solely to Jesus rather than the emerging Church.

=== Historical existence of Jesus ===
To establish the existence of a person without any assumptions, one source from one author (either a supporter or opponent) is needed; for Jesus there are at least 12 independent sources from five authors in the first century from supporters and 2 independent sources from two authors from non-supporters. Since historical sources on other named individuals from first century Galilee were written by either supporters or enemies, these sources on Jesus cannot be dismissed. Bart Ehrman estimates that there are about 30 surviving "independent sources that know there was a man Jesus" written by 25 authors, including 16 in the New Testament. With at least 14 sources by supporters and non-supporters, within a century of the crucifixion, there is much more evidence available for Jesus than for any other notable person from first-century Galilee.

The mainstream scholarly view holds that there was a historical Jesus of Nazareth who lived in first-century AD Roman Judea, but scholars differ on interpretations of portraits of who he was. New Testament scholar Bart D. Ehrman states that Jesus "certainly existed, as virtually every competent scholar of antiquity, Christian or non-Christian, agrees".

Following the criteria of authenticity-approach, scholars differ on the historicity of specific episodes described in the biblical accounts of Jesus, but the baptism and the crucifixion are two events in the life of Jesus that are subject to "almost universal assent". (Note: The basic facts of Jesus' life according to scholars: Dunn 2003, p. 339: "[these] two facts [of baptism and crucifixion] in the life of Jesus command almost universal assent."; Crossan 1995, p. 145: "That he was crucified is as sure as anything historical can ever be, since both Josephus and Tacitus...agree with the Christian accounts on at least that basic fact."; According to Herzog 2005, pp. 1–6, Jesus was baptized by John the Baptist, preached about the coming Kingdom of God, attracted numerous followers including the twelve disciples, and was subsequently crucified by the order of the Roman prefect Pontius Pilate, which eventually led to his immediate followers continuing his movement which soon became known as Christianity.; E. P. Sanders, in "Jesus and Judaism" (1985), says there are eight facts that can be discerned about the historical Jesus: his Baptism, that he was a Galilean itinerant preacher who was reputed to do healings and other 'miracles', he called disciples and spoke of there being 12, that he confined his activity to Israel, that he engaged in controversy over the Temple, that he was crucified outside of Jerusalem by the Romans, that those disciples continued as a movement after his death. In his 1993 work, "The Historical figure of Jesus" he added six more: that Jesus was likely born in 4–6 BC under Herod the Great (the Gregorian calendar is wrong), Jesus grew up in Nazareth, Jesus taught in small villages and towns and seemed to avoid cities, Jesus ate a final meal with his disciples, he was arrested and interrogated by Jewish authorities apparently at the instigation of the high priest, his disciples abandoned him at his death, later believed they saw him and thereafter believed Jesus would return.; Tuckett 2001, pp. 121–137, esp. 125 summarizes the view of mainstream historians regarding what Paul records regarding the historical Jesus: "Even if we had no other sources, we could still infer some things about Jesus from Paul's letters. Paul clearly implies that Jesus existed as a human being ('born of a woman' Gal 4.4), was born a Jew ('born under the Law' Gal 4.4; cf. Rom 1.3) and had brothers (1 Cor 9.5; Gal 1.19). Paul also claims possible character traits for Jesus (cf. 'meekness and gentleness' 2 Cor 10.1; Jesus 'did not please himself' Rom 15.3) and he refers to the tradition of the institution of the Eucharist at the Last Supper (1 Cor 11.23–25), taking place 'at night' (1 Cor 11.23). Above all, he refers very frequently to the fact that Jesus was crucified (1 Cor 1.23; 2.2; Gal 3.1 etc.), and at one point ascribes prime responsibility for Jesus' death to (some) Jews (1 Thess 2.15). He also occasionally explicitly refers to Jesus' teaching, e.g. on divorce (1 Cor 7.10–11) and on Christian preachers or missionaries claiming support (1 Cor 9.14).") According to historian Alanna Nobbs,

While historical and theological debates remain about the actions and significance of this figure, his fame as a teacher, and his crucifixion under the Roman prefect Pontius Pilate, may be described as historically certain.

Historical portraits of Jesus have often differed from each other and from the image portrayed in the gospel accounts. (Note: According to Lataster, a Christ mythicist, "the only thing New Testament scholars seem to agree on is Jesus' historical existence".) The primary portraits of Jesus resulting from the third quest are: apocalyptic prophet; charismatic healer; cynic philosopher; Jewish Messiah; and prophet of social change. According to Ehrman, the most widely held view is that Jesus was an apocalyptic prophet who was subsequently deified.

According to New Testament scholar James Dunn, it is not possible "to construct (from the available data) a Jesus who will be the real Jesus". (Note: No reconstruction possible: Dunn 2003, pp. 125–126: "the historical Jesus is properly speaking a nineteenth- and twentieth-century construction using the data supplied by the Synoptic tradition, not Jesus back then", (the Jesus of Nazareth who walked the hills of Galilee), "and not a figure in history whom we can realistically use to critique the portrayal of Jesus in the Synoptic tradition".; Merrigan 2000, pp. 77–78: "Dunn points out as well that 'the Enlightenment Ideal of historical objectivity also projected a false goal onto the quest for the historical Jesus', which implied that there was a 'historical Jesus', objectively verifiable, 'who will be different from the dogmatic Christ and the Jesus of the Gospels and who will enable us to criticize the dogmatic Christ and the Jesus of the Gospels' (Jesus Remembered, p. 125).") According to Philip R. Davies, a biblical minimalist, "what is being affirmed as the Jesus of history is a cipher, not a rounded personality". (Note: Philip Davies, Did Jesus Exist? Archived September 23, 2015, at the Wayback Machine) According to Ehrman, "the real problem with Jesus" is not the mythicist stance that he is "a myth invented by Christians", but that he was "far too historical", that is, a first-century Judean Jew, who was not like the Jesus preached and proclaimed today. According to Ehrman, "Jesus was a first-century Jew, and when we try to make him into a twenty-first century American we distort everything he was and everything he stood for."

Gregor et al. observed flaws in mythicist usage of Bayesian probability. Mythicist Richard Carrier used 14 people from before the 10th century BC (from the distant past) to calculate the probability of Jesus existing and not existing. His selection of personages influenced his probability of historicity of Jesus to be 33% at best (a fortiori). However, when Gregor's team used a higher sample size of 33 personages from after the 10th century BC (more recent time period) along with the date they were depicted as living, they observed that most were actually historical. This resulted in an updated probability of Jesus' historicity actually increasing from 33% (Carrier) to 99% (corrected). Further research has increased the sample of personnages to 48, enhancing the probability that Jesus existed even further.

=== Demise of authenticity and call for memory studies ===
Since the late 2000s, concern has grown about the usefulness of the criteria of authenticity. (Note: April DeConinck (2007), The Fourth Quest for the Historical Jesus?) According to Chris Keith, the criteria are literary tools, indebted to form criticism, not historiographic tools. They were meant to discern pre-gospel traditions, not to identify historical facts, but have "substituted the pre-literary tradition with that of the historical Jesus". According to Anthony Le Donne, the usage of such criteria is a form of "positivist historiography".

Keith, Le Donne, and others (Note: Crook (2013; Foster 2012, 2013; Keith 2011; 2012a, 2012b; Rodríguez 2012, 2013); Le Donne (2011; 2012a; 2012b); Schröter (1996; 2012; 2013)) argue for a "social memory" approach, which states that memories are shaped by the needs of the present and that instead of searching for a historical Jesus, scholarship should investigate how the memories of Jesus were shaped, and how they were reshaped "with the aim of cohesion and the self-understanding (identity) of groups". James D. G. Dunn's 2003 study, Jesus Remembered, prompted the "increased ... interest in memory theory and eyewitness testimony". (Note: Benjamin I. Simpson, review of The Historiographical Jesus. Memory, Typology, and the Son of David) Dunn argues that "[t]he only realistic objective for any 'quest of the historical Jesus' is Jesus remembered." Dunn argues that Christianity started with the impact Jesus himself had on his followers, who passed on and shaped their memories of him in an oral gospel tradition. According to Dunn, to understand who Jesus was, and what his impact was, scholars have to look at "the broad picture, focusing on the characteristic motifs and emphases of the Jesus tradition, rather than making findings overly dependent on individual items of the tradition".

Le Donne elaborated on Dunn's thesis, basing "his historiography squarely on Dunn's thesis that the historical Jesus is the memory of Jesus recalled by the earliest disciples". According to Le Donne, memories are refactored, and not an exact recalling of the past. He argues that the remembrance of events is facilitated by relating it to a common story or "type", which shapes the way the memories are retained and narrated. He therefore means that the Jesus tradition is not a theological invention of the early Church, but is shaped and refracted by the restraints that the type puts on the narrated memories, due to the mold of the "type".

According to Chris Keith, an alternative to the search for a historical Jesus "posits a historical Jesus who is ultimately unattainable but can be hypothesized on the basis of the interpretations of the early Christians, and as part of a larger process of accounting for how and why early Christians came to view Jesus in the ways that they did". According to Keith, "these two models are methodologically and epistemologically incompatible", calling into question the methods and aim of the first model.

=== Views of Christ myth theorists ===
Mythicists variously argue that the accounts of Jesus are completely or mostly of a mythical nature, questioning the mainstream paradigm of a historical Jesus in the beginning of the first century who was subsequently deified. Most mythicists note that Christianity developed within Hellenistic Judaism, which was influenced by Hellenism, and that early Christianity and the accounts of Jesus are to be understood in this context. Yet, where contemporary New Testament scholarship has introduced several criteria to evaluate the historicity of New Testament passages and sayings, most Christ myth proponents have relied on comparisons of Christian mythemes with contemporary religious traditions, emphasizing the mythological nature of the Bible accounts. (Note: A notable exception is Robert Price, who has used those same criteria to dissect the Jesus to the "vanishing point".)

The most radical mythicists hold, in terms given by Price, the "Jesus atheism" viewpoint, that is, there never was a historical Jesus, only a mythological character, and the mytheme of his incarnation, death, and exaltation. They hold that this character developed out of a syncretistic fusion of Jewish, Hellenistic and Middle Eastern religious thought; was put forward by Paul; and historicised in the gospels, which are also syncretistic. Notable 'Jesus atheists' are Paul-Louis Couchoud, Earl Doherty, Thomas L. Brodie, and Richard Carrier. (Note: (Carrier 2014, p. 52): "[T]he basic thesis of every competent mythologist, then and now, has always been that Jesus was originally a god just like any other god (properly speaking, a demigod in pagan terms; an archangel in Jewish terms; in either sense, a deity), who was later historicized.") (Note: (Doherty 2009, pp. vii–viii): "[The Mythical Jesus viewpoint holds] that Christianity began with a belief in a spiritual, mythical figure...")

Some authors argue for the Jesus agnosticism viewpoint. That is, whether there was a historical Jesus is unknowable and if he did exist, close to nothing can be known about him. Notable 'Jesus agnosticists' are Robert Price and Thomas L. Thompson. According to Thompson, the question of the historicity of Jesus also is not relevant for the understanding of the meaning and function of the Biblical texts in their own times.

Wells in his early works and Alvar Ellegård have argued that the first Christians believed in a historical figure who was in the distant past like Greeks believed for Hercules or Achilles. Ellegård's view is that Paul was an Essene who believed this figure was the Essene Teacher of Righteousness from the Dead Sea Scrolls who lived in the 1st to 2nd century BC. Wells, in his later writings, and came to view the gospel stories of Jesus as containing elements of a historical figure "traceable to the activity of a Galilean preacher of the early first century," preserved in the Q source, who was added to Paul's mythical Jesus in the gospels, arguing for "two originally quite independent streams of tradition", which were fused in the gospels, (Note: In his later works, Wells argued that Paul's Jesus was a mythical character, which was woven together in the gospels with stories about a Galilean preacher. Wells insisted that this figure of the Q-source is distinct from the sacrificial Christ myth of Paul's epistles and other early Christian documents, and that these two figures have different sources before being fused in Mark: Wells 2009, pp. 14–15: "When I first addressed these problems, more than thirty years ago, it seemed to me that, because the earliest Christian references to Jesus are so vague, the gospel Jesus could be no more than a mythical expansion and elaboration of this obscure figure. But from the mid-1990s I became persuaded that many of the gospel traditions are too specific in their references to time, place, and circumstances to have developed in such a short time from no other basis, and are better understood as traceable to the activity of a Galilean preacher of the early first century, the personage represented in Q (the inferred non-Markan source, not extant, common to Matthew and Luke; cf. above, p. 2), which may be even earlier than the Paulines. This is the position I have argued in my books of 1996, 1999, and 2004, although the titles of the first two of these—The Jesus Legend and The Jesus Myth—may mislead potential readers into supposing that I still denied the historicity of the gospel Jesus. These titles were chosen because I regarded (and still do regard) the virgin birth, much in the Galilean ministry, the crucifixion around A.D. 30 under Pilate, and the resurrection as legendary."; Wells 2009, p. 16: "What we have in the gospels is surely a fusion of two originally quite independent streams of tradition [...] the Galilean preacher of the early first century who had met with rejection, and the supernatural personage of the early epistles, [the Jesus of Paul] who sojourned briefly on Earth and then, rejected, returned to heaven—have been condensed into one. The [human] preacher has been given a [mythical] salvific death and resurrection, and these have been set not in an unspecified past (as in the early epistles) but in a historical context consonant with the Galilean preaching. The fusion of the two figures will have been facilitated by the fact that both owe quite a lot of their substance in the documents—to ideas very important in the Jewish Wisdom literature."; Compare David Tacey (2015), Religion as Metaphor: Beyond Literal Belief, Transaction Publishers: "I do not doubt the existence of a real Jesus, but I adopt the view that the representation of this figure in the gospels is not historical but mythological. This has caused some to draw a distinction between the Jesus of history and the Christ of theology. We know little about the former, but I concur with Jung that "this Christ of St. Paul's would hardly have been possible without the historical Jesus. My reading of Jesus is not to be confused with the tradition known as the "Christ Myth Theory".) leaving open the question regarding Paul's Christ "as to whether such a person had in fact existed and lived the obscure life that Paul supposed of him." According to Wells, "There is no means of deciding this issue."

== Overview of main mythicist arguments ==
According to New Testament scholar Robert Van Voorst, most Christ mythicists follow a threefold argument first set forward by German historian Bruno Bauer in the 1800s: they question the reliability of the Pauline epistles and the Gospels to postulate a historically existing Jesus; they note the lack of information on Jesus in non-Christian sources from the first and early second century; and they argue that early Christianity had syncretistic and mythological origins. More specifically:

- Paul's epistles lack detailed biographical information—most mythicists agree that the Pauline epistles are older than the gospels, and note that aside from a few passages which may have been interpolations, there is a complete absence of any detailed biographical information such as might be expected if Jesus had been a contemporary of Paul, nor do they cite any sayings from Jesus, the so-called argument from silence. (Note: Argument from silence: Ehrman 2012, p. 34: "[The basic mythicist position is] the negative argument, that we have no reliable witness that even mentions a historical Jesus, and the positive one, that his story appears to have been modeled on the accounts told of other divinities..."; Eddy & Boyd 2007, p. 165: "[Some Christ myth theorists] make much of the claim that there is little or no credible information about the historical Jesus to be found in first—and second—century non-Christian sources or in Paul, the earliest Christian source. Surely if a miracle-working prophet like the Jesus of the Gospels actually existed, it is argued, Paul and pagan contemporaries would have mentioned his feats and his teachings. Instead, they argue, we find a virtual silence.") Some mythicists have argued that the Pauline epistles are from a later date than usually assumed, and therefore not a reliable source on the life of Jesus.
- The gospels are not historical records, but a fictitious historical narrative—mythicists argue that although the gospels seem to present a historical framework, they are not historical records, but theological writings, myth or legendary fiction resembling the Hero archetype. They impose "a fictitious historical narrative" on a "mythical cosmic savior figure", weaving together various pseudo-historical Jesus traditions, though there may have been a real historical person, of whom close to nothing can be known.
- There are no independent eyewitness accounts—No independent eyewitness accounts survive, in spite of the fact that many authors were writing at that time. Early second-century Roman accounts contain very little evidence and may depend on Christian sources.
- Jesus was a mythological being, who was concretized in the Gospels—early Christianity was widely diverse and syncretistic, sharing common philosophical and religious ideas with other religions of the time. It arose in the Greco-Roman world of the first and second centuries AD, synthesizing Greek Stoicism and Neoplatonism with Hebrew Bible writings and the exegetical methods of Philo, creating the mythological figure of Jesus. Paul refers to Jesus as an exalted being, and is probably writing about either a mythical or supernatural entity, (Note: (Wells 1999, pp. 94–111, §. Conclusion: The Origins and Development of Christology): (Wells 1999b): "The Jewish literature describes Wisdom [personified] as God's chief agent, a member of his divine council, etc., and this implies supernatural, but not, I agree, divine status."; (Wells 2009, p. 328): "I have always allowed that Paul believed in a Jesus who, fundamentally supernatural, had nevertheless been incarnated on Earth as a man.") a celestial deity named Jesus. This deity is derived from personified aspects of God, notably the personification of Wisdom, or "a savior figure patterned after similar figures within ancient mystery religions," (Note: (Price 2003, p. 350): "This astonishingly complete absence of reliable gospel material begins to coincide, along its own authentic trajectory ...with another minimalist approach to the historical Jesus, namely, that there never was one. Most of the Dutch Radical scholars, following Bruno Bauer, argued that all of the gospel tradition was fabricated to historicize an originally bare datum of a savior, perhaps derived from the Mystery Religions or Gnosticism or even further afield. The basic argument offered for this position, it seems to me, is that of analogy, the resemblances between Jesus and Gnostic and Mystery Religion saviors being just too numerous and close to dismiss.") which were often (but not always) a dying-and-rising god. While Paul may also contain proto-Gnostic ideas, some mythicists have argued that Paul may refer to a historical person who may have lived in a dim past, long before the beginnings of the Common Era.

== Mainstream and mythicist views on the arguments ==
=== Lack of detailed biographical information in Pauline epistles ===
==== Dating and attribution ====
===== Mainstream view =====
The mainstream view is that the seven undisputed Pauline epistles considered by scholarly consensus to be genuine epistles are generally dated to circa 48–62 AD and are the earliest surviving Christian texts that include information about Jesus. (Note: (Johnson 2010, p. 241, §. Pauls Ministry and Letters): "Nearly all critical scholars accept seven letters as written by Paul: Romans, 1 and 2 Corinthians, Galatians, Philippians, 1 Thessalonians, and Philemon. There is almost equal unanimity in rejecting 1 and 2 Timothy and Titus. Serious debate can occasionally be found concerning 2 Thessalonians, Colossians, and Ephesians, but the clear and growing scholarly consensus considers them to be non-Pauline.") Most scholars view the Pauline letters as essential elements in the study of the historical Jesus, and the development of early Christianity.

===== Mythicist view =====
Mythicists agree on the importance of the Pauline epistles, some agreeing with this early dating, and taking the Pauline epistles as their point of departure from mainstream scholarship. They argue that those letters point solely into the direction of a celestial or mythical being, or contain no definitive information on a historical Jesus. Some mythicists, though, have questioned the early dating of the epistles, raising the possibility that they represent a later, more developed strand of early Christian thought.

Theologian Willem Christiaan van Manen of the Dutch school of radical criticism noted various anachronisms in the Pauline epistles. Van Manen claimed that they could not have been written in their final form earlier than the second century. He also noted that the Marcionite school was the first to publish the epistles, and that Marcion (c. 85 – c. 160) used them as justification for his gnostic and docetic views that Jesus' incarnation was not in a physical body. Van Manen also studied Marcion's version of Galatians in contrast to the canonical version and argued that the canonical version was a later revision that de-emphasized the Gnostic aspects.

Price also argues for a later dating of the epistles, and sees them as a compilation of fragments (possibly with a Gnostic core), contending that Marcion was responsible for much of the Pauline corpus or even wrote the letters himself. Price criticizes other Christ myth theorists for holding the mid-first-century dating of the epistles for their own apologetical reasons. (Note: Price argues that passages such as Galatians 1:18–20, Galatians 4:4 and 1 Corinthians 15:3–11 are late Catholic interpolations and that 1 Thessalonians 2:14–16 was unlikely to have been written by a Jew.)

==== Lack of biographical information ====
===== Mainstream view =====
According to Gregory A. Boyd and Paul Rhodes Eddy modern biblical scholarship notes that "Paul has relatively little to say on the biographical information of Jesus" compared to the Gospels. However, Paul was "a recent contemporary" of Jesus. and he alludes to some aspects of Jesus' life in the letters. Paul's letters states that he knew eyewitnesses of Jesus including his close disciples and Jesus' brother James going as far back as 36 CE. (Note: (Ehrman 2012, pp. 144–146): "He was a member of an even closer inner circle made up of Peter, James, and John. In the Gospels these three spend more time with Jesus than anyone else does during his entire ministry...In about the year 36, Paul went to Jerusalem to confer with Peter (Galatians 1:18–20). Paul spent fifteen days there...But it defies belief that Paul would have spent over two weeks with Jesus's closest companion and not learned something about him—for example, that he lived. Even more telling is the much-noted fact that Paul claims that he met with, and therefore personally knew, Jesus's own brother James... And so in the letter to the Galatians Paul states as clearly as possible that he knew Jesus's brother. Can we get any closer to an eyewitness report than this? The fact that Paul knew Jesus's closest disciple and his own brother throws a real monkey wrench into the mythicist view that Jesus never lived.") Paul and other sources enumerate that Jesus had siblings named James, Joseph, Symeon, and Jude.

Paul viewed Jesus as being a descendant of David, having an upbringing in the Jewish Law, gathering disciples, involved in the Last Supper, being betrayed, being executed, and resurrecting. The early references by Paul about the life of Jesus support that Jesus existed and that Paul had a general interest in his life. According to Christopher Tuckett, "[e]ven if we had no other sources, we could still infer some things about Jesus from Paul's letters" such that he was a Jew with siblings, and that he was a preacher who was executed.

===== Mythicist view =====
Robert Price says that Paul does not refer to Jesus' earthly life, also not when that life might have provided convenient examples and justifications for Paul's teachings. Instead, revelation seems to have been a prominent source for Paul's knowledge about Jesus.

=== The Gospels are not historical records ===
==== Mainstream view ====
The consensus among scholars is that the gospels are a type of ancient biography similar to Xenophon’s Memoirs of Socrates. Ancient biography is a genre which was concerned with providing examples for readers to emulate while preserving and promoting the subject's reputation and memory, as well as including propaganda and kerygma (preaching) in their works. (Note: Michael Vines notes that the gospel of Mark may have aspects similar to a Jewish novel, while some scholars have argued that the Gospels are symbolical representations of the Torah, which were written in response to the Roman occupation and the suppression of Jewish religiosity.) Biblical scholarship regards the gospels to be the literary manifestation of oral traditions that originated during the life of a historical Jesus, who according to Dunn had a profound impact on his followers.

There are archeological finds that corroborate aspects of the time of Jesus mentioned in the Gospels, such as context from Nazareth, the High Priest Caiaphas' ossuary, numerous synagogue buildings, and Jehohanan, a crucified victim who had a Jewish burial after execution. Written sources and excavations on Nazareth correlate with Jesus' existence, Joseph and Jesus' occupation as craftworkers, presence of literacy, existence of synagogues, Gospel accounts relating to Nazareth, and other Roman period sources on Nazareth.

Oral traditions in the gospels precede the surviving gospels by decades, going back to the time of Jesus and the time of Paul's persecution of the early Christian Jews, prior to his conversion. (Note: Paul's conversion occurred two years after the crucifixion of Jesus.) Most available sources are collections of early oral traditions about Jesus and the historical value of traditions are not necessarily correlated with the later dates of composition of writings since even later sources can contain early tradition material. Theissen and Merz state that these traditions can be dated back well before the composition of the synoptic gospels, that such traditions show local familiarity of the region, and that such traditions were explicitly called "memory", indicating biographical elements that included historical references such as notable people from his era. According to Maurice Casey, some of the sources, such as parts of the Gospel of Mark, are translations of early Aramaic sources which indicate proximity with eyewitness testimony.

==== Mythicist view ====
Mythicists argue that in the gospels "a fictitious historical narrative" was imposed on the "mythical cosmic savior figure" created by Paul. According to Robert Price, the gospels "smack of fictional composition", arguing that they are a type of legendary fiction and that the story of Jesus portrayed in the gospels fits the mythic hero archetype. The mythic hero archetype, present in many cultures, often has a miraculous conception or virgin births heralded by wise men and marked by a star, is tempted by or fights evil forces, dies on a hill, appears after death and then ascends to heaven. According to Earl Doherty, the gospels are "essentially allegory and fiction".

According to Wells in his later writings, a historical Jesus existed, whose teachings were preserved in the Q source. Wells said the gospels weave together two Jesus narratives, namely the Galilean preacher of the Q document, and Paul's mythical Jesus. Doherty disagrees with Wells regarding the teacher of the Q-document, arguing that he was an allegorical character who personified Wisdom and came to be regarded as the founder of the Q-community. According to Doherty, Q's Jesus and Paul's Christ were combined in the Gospel of Mark by a predominantly Gentile community.

==== Mainstream criticism ====
Ehrman notes that the gospels are based on oral sources, which played a decisive role in attracting new converts. Christian theologians have cited the mythic hero archetype as a defense of Christian teaching while completely affirming a historical Jesus. Secular academics Kendrick and McFarland have also pointed out that the teachings of Jesus marked "a radical departure from all the conventions by which heroes had been defined".

=== No independent eyewitness accounts ===
==== Lack of surviving historic records ====
===== Mythicist view =====
Myth proponents claim there is significance in the lack of surviving historic records about Jesus of Nazareth from any non-Christian author until the second century, (Note: Martin (1993), p. 52: "[P]agan witnesses indicate that there is no reliable evidence that supports the historicity of Jesus. This is surely surprising given the fact that Jesus was supposed to be a well-known person in the area of the world ruled by Rome. One would surely have supposed that there would have been some surviving records of Jesus if he did exist. Their absence, combined with the absence of Jewish records, suggests that NEP [Negative Evidence Principle] applies and that we are justified in disbelieving that Jesus existed.") adding that Jesus left no writings or other archaeological evidence. They note that Jewish philosopher Philo of Alexandria did not mention Jesus when he wrote about the cruelty of Pontius Pilate around 40 AD.

===== Mainstream criticism =====
No ancient sources, even by enemies of Christianity, ever claimed that Jesus did not exist. Bart Ehrman estimates that there are about 30 surviving independent sources written by 25 authors who attest to Jesus. Including by non-Christians in the first century. According to archeologist Ken Dark, for Jesus there are at least 14 independent sources from seven authors who were supporters and non-supporters within a century of the crucifixion. Since historical sources on other named individuals from first century Galilee were written by either supporters or enemies, these sources on Jesus cannot be dismissed. With at least 14 sources by supporters and non-supporters there is much more evidence available for Jesus than for any other notable person from first-century Galilee.

Paul's letters are the earliest surviving sources on Jesus. Paul states he personally knew eyewitnesses of Jesus such as his closest disciples and even his brother James since the mid 30s CE. Paul's reference to James as Jesus' brother in particular is distinctive. Additionally, there are other independent sources (Mark, John, Paul, Josephus) affirming that Jesus had brothers.

Theissen and Merz observe that even if ancient sources were to be silent on any individual, they would not impact their historicity since there are numerous instances of people whose existence is never doubted and yet were not mentioned by contemporary authors. For instance, Paul is not mentioned by Josephus or non-Christian sources; John the Baptist is not mentioned by Paul, Philo, or rabbinic writings; Rabbi Hillel is not mentioned by Josephus - despite him being a Pharisee; Bar Kochba, a leader of the Jewish revolt against the Romans is not mentioned by Dio Cassius in his account of the revolt. Nonetheless, even non-Christian sources do exist and they do corroborate key details of the life of Jesus that are also found in New Testament sources.

According to Classical historian Michael Grant, that when the New Testament is analyzed with the same criteria used by historians on ancient writings that contain historical material, Jesus's existence cannot be denied any more than secular figures whose existence is never questioned.

Mainstream biblical scholars point out that much of the writings of antiquity have been lost and that there was little written about any Jew or Christian in this period. Ehrman points out that there is no known archaeological or textual evidence for the existence of most people in the ancient world, even famous people like Pontius Pilate, whom the myth theorists agree to have existed. Robert Hutchinson notes that this is also true of Josephus, despite the fact that he was "a personal favorite of the Roman Emperor Vespasian". Hutchinson quotes Ehrman, who notes that Josephus is never mentioned in first-century Greek or Roman sources, despite being "a personal friend of the emperor".

==== Josephus and Tacitus ====
There are three non-Christian sources that are typically used to study and establish the historicity of Jesus, namely two mentions in Josephus, and one mention in the Roman source Tacitus.

===== Mythicist view =====
Myth proponents note that the Testimonium Flavianum is likely a forgery by Christian apologist Eusebius in the 4th century or by others. (Note: No one seemed to notice this passage until the 4th century, not even Origen who quotes Josephus extensively in his works, thus leading mythicists to think that the Testimonium Flavianum is a forgery of the 4th century, perhaps written by Eusebius in order to provide an outside Jewish authority for the life of Jesus.) Richard Carrier further argues that the original text of Antiquities 20 referred to a brother of the high priest Jesus son of Damneus, named James, and not to the Jesus of Christianity. Carrier further argues that the words "the one called Christ" likely resulted from the accidental insertion of a marginal note added by some unknown reader.

Christ myth theory supporters such as Carrier note that sources such as Tacitus and others, which were written decades after the supposed events, include no independent traditions that relate to Jesus, and hence can provide no confirmation of historical facts about him.

===== Mainstream view =====
From these two independent sources alone (Josephus and Tacitus), we can adduce certain facts about Jesus: that he existed, his personal name was Jesus, he was called a messiah, he had a brother named James, he won over Jews and gentiles, Jewish leaders had unfavorable opinions of him, Pontius Pilate decided his execution, he was executed by crucifixion, was executed during Pilate's governorship.

Josephus was a Jewish historian and commander in Galille who trained 100,000 men in the region, stationed in Sepphoris for a time, which was 3 miles away from Nazareth, the hometown of Jesus; and so he dwelled with inhabitants who would have known Jesus and knew participants in the trials of Jesus and his brother James such as the Sanhedrin and Ananus II. Josephus' Antiquities of the Jews, written around 93–94 AD, includes two references to the biblical Jesus in Books 18 and 20. On the first reference, known as the Testimonium Flavianum in Book 18, since the late 20th century, the general consensus has held that the Testimonium is partially authentic in that an authentic nucleus referencing the life of Jesus was original to Josephus. Josephus scholars note that up to the Enlightenment, the Testimonium was never used against the existence of Jesus since no ancient source or ancient reference to the Testimonium supports that hypothesis. On the second reference to Jesus from Josephus, Josephus scholar Louis H. Feldman states that "few have doubted the genuineness" of Josephus' reference to Jesus in Antiquities 20, 9, 1 ("the brother of Jesus, who was called Christ, whose name was James").

Roman historian Tacitus referred to "Christus" and his execution by Pontius Pilate in his Annals (written c. AD 116), book 15, chapter 44. (Note: Tacitus: "... a class hated for their abominations, called Christians by the populace. Christus, from whom the name had its origin, suffered the extreme penalty during the reign of Tiberius at the hands of one of our procurators, Pontius Pilatus.") The very negative tone of Tacitus' comments on Christians makes most experts believe that the passage is extremely unlikely to have been forged by a Christian scribe. The Tacitus reference is now widely accepted as an independent confirmation of Jesus' crucifixion.

==== Other early ancient sources ====
===== Mainstream view =====
In Jesus Outside the New Testament (2000), Van Voorst considers references to Jesus in classical writings, Jewish writings, hypothetical sources of the canonical Gospels, and extant Christian writings outside the New Testament. He concludes that non-Christian sources provide "a small but certain corroboration of certain New Testament historical traditions on the family background, time of life, ministry, and death of Jesus", as well as "evidence of the content of Christian preaching that is independent of the New Testament", while extra-biblical Christian sources give access to "some important information about the earliest traditions on Jesus". However, New Testament sources remain central for "both the main lines and the details about Jesus' life and teaching".

=== Jesus was a mythical being ===
==== Syncretism and diversity ====
===== Mainstream view =====
Most historians agree that Jesus or his followers established a new Jewish sect that attracted both Jewish and gentile converts. Out of this Jewish sect developed Early Christianity, which was very diverse, with proto-orthodoxy and "heretical" views like Gnosticism alongside each other. According to Ehrman, a number of early Christianities existed in the first century AD, from which developed various Christian traditions and denominations, including proto-orthodoxy. According to Dunn, four types of early Christianity can be discerned: Jewish Christianity, Hellenistic Christianity, Apocalyptic Christianity, and early Catholicism.

===== Mythicist view =====
In Christ and the Caesars (1877), philosopher Bruno Bauer suggested that Christianity was a synthesis of the Stoicism of Seneca the Younger, Greek Neoplatonism, and the Jewish theology of Philo as developed by pro-Roman Jews such as Josephus. This new religion was in need of a founder and created its Christ. In a review of Bauer's work, Robert Price notes that Bauer's basic stance regarding the Stoic tone and the fictional nature of the gospels are still repeated in contemporary scholarship.

Doherty notes that, with the conquests of Alexander the Great, the Greek culture and language spread throughout the eastern Mediterranean world, influencing the already existing cultures there. The Roman conquest of this area added to the cultural diversity, but also to a sense of alienation and pessimism. A rich diversity of religious and philosophical ideas was available and Judaism was held in high regard by non-Jews for its monotheistic ideas and its high moral standards. Yet monotheism was also offered by Greek philosophy, especially Platonism, with its high God and the intermediary Logos. According to Doherty, "Out of this rich soil of ideas arose Christianity, a product of both Jewish and Greek philosophy", echoing Bruno Bauer, who argued that Christianity was a synthesis of Stoicism, Greek Neoplatonism, and Jewish thought.

Robert Price notes that Christianity started among Hellenized Jews, who mixed allegorical interpretations of Jewish traditions with Jewish Gnostic, Zoroastrian, and mystery cult elements. (Note: Price: (Price 2010, p. 103, n. 5): "Bolland, De Evangelische Jozua; Rylands, The Evolution of Christianity; Rylands, The Beginnings of Gnostic Christianity; Zindler, The Jesus the Jews Never Knew, 340, and others similarly held that Christianity began variously among Hellenized Jewish settlements throughout the Diaspora, with allegorized Jewish elements being made almost unrecognizable by their intermingling with gnostic mythemes."; (Price 2002, §. Suitors and Seducers): "The temptations and challenges of the Diaspora only served to increase the diversity of ancient Judaism, a diversity directly reflected in emerging Christianity, which demonstrably partakes of Jewish Gnosticism [Schmithals, 1975; Scholem, 1965], Zoroastrianism [Welburn, 1991], the Mystery Cults, etc. [Walter Schmithals, The Apocalyptic Movement: Introduction and Interpretation. Trans. John E. Steely (NY: Abingdon Press, 1975; Gershom Scholem, Jewish Gnosticism, Merkabah Mysticism, and Talmudic Tradition. NY: Jewish Theological Seminary of America, 2nd ed., 1965), esp. chapter IX, "The Relationship between Gnostic and Jewish Sources," pp. 65–74.] [Andrew Welburn, The Beginnings of Christianity: Essene Mystery, Gnostic Revelation and the Christian Vision (Edinburgh: Floris Books, 1991), pp. 44–51. The identification of the Nag Hammadi Apocalypse of Adam as Zoroastrian in substance has enormous implications.]") Some myth proponents note that some stories in the New Testament reinforce Old Testament prophecies and repeat stories about figures such as Elijah, Elisha, Moses and Joshua in order to appeal to Jewish converts. Price notes that almost all the gospel stories have parallels in the Old Testament and other traditions, concluding that the gospels are not independent sources for a historical Jesus, but "legend and myth, fiction and redaction".

According to Doherty, the rapid growth of early Christian communities and the great variety of ideas cannot be explained by a single missionary effort, but points to parallel developments that arose at various places and competed for support. Paul's arguments against rival apostles also point to this diversity. Doherty further notes that Yeshua (Jesus) is a generic name, meaning "Yahweh saves" and refers to the concept of divine salvation, which could apply to any kind of saving entity or Wisdom.

==== Paul's Jesus is a deity ====
===== Mainstream view =====
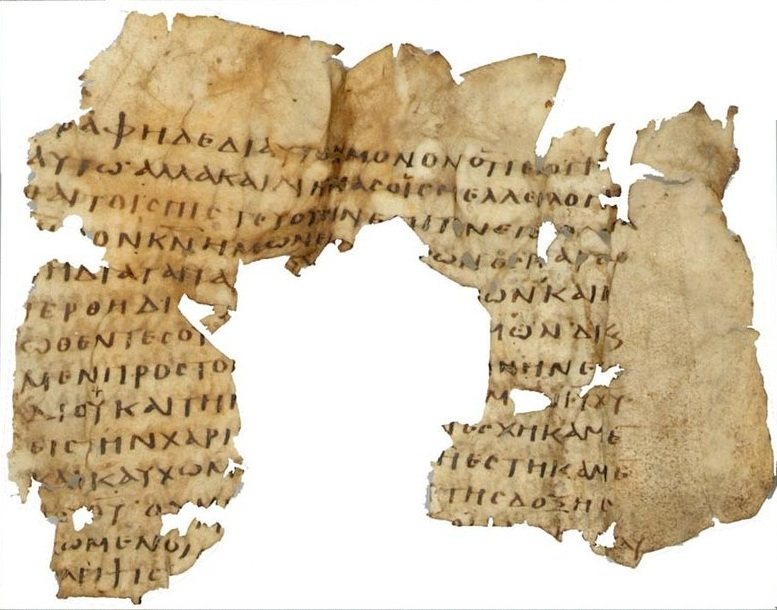
A third-century fragment of Paul's letter to the Romans

According to mainstream scholarship, Jesus was an eschatological preacher or teacher, who was believed by his followers to be exalted after his death. The Pauline letters incorporate creeds, or confessions of faith, that predate Paul, and give essential information on the faith of the early Jerusalem community around James, 'the brother of Jesus'. These pre-Pauline creeds date to within a few years of Jesus' death and developed within the Christian community in Jerusalem. The First Epistle to the Corinthians contains one of the earliest Christian creeds expressing belief in the risen Jesus, namely 1 Corinthians 15:3–41:

For I handed on to you as of first importance what I in turn had received: that Christ died for our sins in accordance with the scriptures, (Note: The kerygma from 1:Cor.15:3–5 refers to two mythologies: the Greek myth of the noble dead, to which the Maccabean notion of martyrdom and dying for ones people is related; and the Jewish myth of the persecuted sage or righteous man, c.q. the "story of the child of wisdom". The notion of 'dying for' refers to this martyrdom and persecution. James F. McGrath refers to 4 Maccabees 6, "which presents a martyr praying 'Be merciful to your people, and let our punishment suffice for them. Make my blood their purification, and take my life in exchange for theirs' (4 Maccabees 6:28–29). Clearly there were ideas that existed in the Judaism of the time that helped make sense of the death of the righteous in terms of atonement." (Note: James F. McGrath (2007), What's Wrong With Penal Substitution?) See also Herald Gandi (2018), The Resurrection: "According to the Scriptures"?, referring to Isaiah 53, among others: Surely he has borne our infirmities and carried our diseases; yet we accounted him stricken, struck down by God, and afflicted. But he was wounded for our transgressions, crushed for our iniquities; upon him was the punishment that made us whole, and by his bruises we are healed ... Yet it was the will of the Lord to crush him with pain. When you make his life an offering for sin, he shall see his offspring, and shall prolong his days; through him the will of the Lord shall prosper. Out of his anguish he shall see light; he shall find satisfaction through his knowledge. The righteous one, my servant, shall make many righteous, and he shall bear their iniquities.) and that he was buried, and that he was raised on the third day in accordance with the scriptures, (Note: See Why was Resurrection on "the Third Day"? Two Insights for explanations on the phrase "third day". According to Pinchas Lapide, "third day" may refer to Hosea 6:1–2: Come, let us return to the Lord; for he has torn us, that he may heal us; he has struck us down, and he will bind us up. After two days he will revive us; on the third day he will raise us up, that we may live before him. See also 2 Kings 20:8: "Hezekiah said to Isaiah, 'What shall be the sign that the Lord will heal me, and that I shall go up to the house of the Lord on the third day?'" According to Sheehan, Paul's reference to Jesus having risen "on the third day ... simply expresses the belief that Jesus was rescued from the fate of utter absence from God (death) and was admitted to the saving presence of God (the eschatological future)".) and that he appeared to Cephas, then to the twelve. Then he appeared to more than five hundred brothers and sisters at one time, most of whom are still alive, though some have died. Then he appeared to James, then to all the apostles. Last of all, as to one untimely born, he appeared also to me.

James Dunn states that in 1 Corinthians 15:3 Paul "recites the foundational belief", namely "that Christ died". According to Dunn, "Paul was told about a Jesus who had died two years earlier or so." 1 Corinthians 15:11 also refers to others before Paul who preached the creed.

According to New Testament scholar Larry Hurtado, Jesus' death was interpreted as a redemptive death "for our sins" in accordance with God's plan as contained in the Jewish scriptures. The significance lay in "the theme of divine necessity and fulfillment of the scriptures," rather than the later Pauline emphasis on "Jesus' death as a sacrifice or an expiation for our sins." For the early Jewish Christians, "the idea that Messiah's death was a necessary redemptive event functioned more as an apologetic explanation for Jesus' crucifixion", "proving that Jesus' death was no surprise to God." (Note: Hurtado cites Green, The Death of Jesus, p.323.) According to Krister Stendahl, the main concern of Paul's writings on Jesus' role, and salvation by faith, is not the individual conscience of human sinners, and their doubts about being chosen by God or not, but the problem of the inclusion of gentile (Greek) Torah observers into God's covenant. (Note: Stephen Westerholm (2015), The New Perspective on Paul in Review, Direction, Spring 2015 · Vol. 44 No. 1 · pp. 4–15) (Note: Dunn quotes Stendahl: "Cf Stendahl, Paul among Jews and Gentiles, passim—e.g "... a doctrine of faith was hammered out by Paul for the very specific and limited purpose of defending the rights of Gentile converts to be full and genuine heirs to the promise of God to Israel"(p.2)" Stephen Westerholm: "For Paul, the question that "justification by faith" was intended to answer was, "On what terms can Gentiles gain entrance to the people of God?" Bent on denying any suggestion that Gentiles must become Jews and keep the Jewish law, he answered, 'By faith—and not by works of the (Jewish) law.'" Westerholm refers to: Krister Stendahl, The Apostle Paul and the Introspective Conscience of the West, Harvard Theological Review 56 (1963), 199–215; reprinted in Stendahl, Paul Among Jews and Gentiles and Other Essays (Philadelphia: Fortress, 1976), 78–96. Westerholm quotes Sanders: "Sanders noted that "the salvation of the Gentiles is essential to Paul's preaching; and with it falls the law; for, as Paul says simply, Gentiles cannot live by the law (Gal. 2.14)" (496). On a similar note, Sanders suggested that the only Jewish "boasting" to which Paul objected was that which exulted over the divine privileges granted to Israel and failed to acknowledge that God, in Christ, had opened the door of salvation to Gentiles.")

Secular scholars often explain the appearances of Jesus as visionary experiences, in which the presence of Jesus was felt. According to Ehrman, the visions of Jesus and the subsequent belief in Jesus' resurrection radically changed the perceptions of his early followers, concluding from his absence that he must have been exalted to heaven, by God himself, exalting him to an unprecedented status and authority. According to Hurtado, the resurrection experiences were religious experiences that "seem to have included visions of (and/or ascents to) God's heaven, in which the glorified Christ was seen in an exalted position", and that may have occurred mostly during corporate worship. Johan Leman contends that the communal meals provided a context in which participants entered a state of mind in which the presence of Jesus was felt. Conservative Christian scholars object against this theory, but instead argue in favor of a real, bodily resurrection. According to Wright, Paul "believed he had seen the risen Jesus in person, and [...] his understanding of who this Jesus was included the firm belief that he possessed a transformed but still physical body."

The Pauline creeds contain elements of a Christ myth and its cultus, such as the Christ hymn of Philippians 2:6–11, (Note: See Philippians#2:6–11 for full text: 5 Have this mind in you, which was also in Christ Jesus: 6 who, existing in the form of God, counted not the being on an equality with God a thing to be grasped, 7 but emptied himself, taking the form of a servant, being made in the likeness of men; 8 and being found in fashion as a man, he humbled himself, becoming obedient [even] unto death, yea, the death of the cross. 9 Wherefore also God highly exalted him, and gave unto him the name which is above every name; 10 that in the name of Jesus every knee should bow, of [things] in heaven and [things] on earth and [things] under the earth, 11 and that every tongue should confess that Jesus Christ is Lord, to the glory of God the Father.) which portrays Jesus as an incarnated and subsequently exalted heavenly being. (Note: The New Testament writings contain both an exaltation and an incarnation Christology, that is, the view that Jesus became Christ when he was resurrected and taken up to Heaven, and the view that Jesus was a heavenly being who was incarnated on earth. According to Ehrman, the synoptic Gospels reflect exaltation Christologies, which present different views on the exaltation, from the resurrection to the moment of his baptism, and still earlier to his conception; whereas Paul and the Gospel of John reflect incarnation theologies.) Scholars view these as indications that the incarnation and exaltation of Jesus was part of Christian tradition a few years after his death and over a decade before the writing of the Pauline epistles. (Note: The development of the early Christian views on Jesus' divinity is a matter of debate within contemporary scholarship. According to a longstanding consensus, the oldest Christology was an "exaltation Christology", according to which Jesus was subsequently "raised to divine status". This "exaltation Christology" may have developed over time, as witnessed in the Gospels, with the earliest Christians believing that Jesus became divine when he was resurrected. Later beliefs shifted the exaltation to his baptism, birth, and subsequently to the idea of his eternal existence, as witnessed in the Gospel of John. This "High Christology" is "the view that Jesus was a pre-existent divine being who became a human, did the Father's will on earth, and then was taken back up into heaven whence he had originally come". Yet, as Ehrman notes, this subsequent "incarnation Christology" was also preached by Paul, and even predates him. According to the "Early High Christology Club", which includes Martin Hengel, Larry Hurtado, and Richard Bauckham, this "incarnation Christology" or "high Christology" did not evolve over a longer time, but was a "big bang" which arose in the first few decades of the church, as witnessed in the writings of Paul.)

Recent scholarship places the exaltation and devotion of Jesus firmly in a Jewish context. Andrew Chester argues that "for Paul, Jesus is clearly a figure of the heavenly world, and thus fits a messianic category already developed within Judaism, where the Messiah is a human or angelic figure belonging ... in the heavenly world, a figure who at the same time has had specific, limited role on earth". According to Ehrman, Paul regarded Jesus to be an angel, who was incarnated on earth. (Note: Ehrman-blog, Paul's View of Jesus as an Angel: "Paul understood Christ to be an angel who became a human." See also Paul's View of Jesus as an Angel, Christ as an Angel in Paul (10 April 2014), Christ as an Angel in Paul (7 June 2014); and Carrier's response at Bart Ehrman on How Jesus Became God.) (Note: Mainstream scholars have noted the extent and significance of Jewish belief in a chief angel acting as a heavenly mediator during the Second Temple period, as well as the similarities between Jesus and this chief celestial angel.) According to James Waddell, Paul's conception of Jesus as a heavenly figure was influenced by the Book of Enoch and its conception of the Messiah. (Note: Bob Foster, The Messiah (Waddell)) (Note: The Book of Enoch (3rd–1st century BCE) is the first text to contain the idea of a preexistent heavenly Messiah, called the "Son of Man". (Note: Joseph Jacobs, Moses Buttenwieser (1906), Messiah, Jewish Encyclopedia) He is described as an angelic being, who "was chosen and hidden with God before the world was created, and will remain in His presence forevermore". He is the embodiment of justice and Wisdom, seated on a throne in Heaven, who will be revealed to the world at the end of times when he will judge all beings.)

===== Mythicist views =====
Christ myth theorists generally reject the idea that Paul's epistles refer to a historical individual. (Note: (Price 2009): * See p. 55 for his argument that it is quite likely Jesus did not exist. * See pp. 62–64, 75 for the three pillars) According to Doherty, the Jesus of Paul was a divine Son of God, existing in a spiritual realm where he was crucified and resurrected. This mythological Jesus was based on exegesis of the Old Testament and mystical visions of a risen Jesus. According to Carrier, the genuine Pauline epistles show that the Apostle Peter and the Apostle Paul believed in a visionary or dream Jesus, based on a pesher of Septuagint verses and Zechariah 3 and 6, Daniel 9 and Isaiah 52–53. Carrier notes that there is little if any concrete information about Jesus' earthly life in the Pauline epistles.

According to Carrier, originally Jesus was a celestial or "angelic extraterrestrial" who came from a "cosmic sperm bank" and was tortured and crucified by Satan and his demons, buried in a tomb above the clouds, and resurrected - everything occurring in outer space. According to Carrier "[t]his 'Jesus' would most likely have been the same archangel identified by Philo of Alexandria as already extant in Jewish theology", that Philo knew by all of the attributes by which Paul knew Jesus. (Note: The firstborn son of God (Epistle to the Romans 8:29), the celestial image of God (Second Epistle to the Corinthians 4:4) and God's agent of creation (First Epistle to the Corinthians 8:6). He was also God's celestial high priest (Hebrews 2:17, 4:14, etc.) and God's Logos.) According to Carrier, Philo says this being was identified as the figure named Jesus in the Book of Zechariah, implying that "already before Christianity there were Jews aware of a celestial being named Jesus who had all of the attributes the earliest Christians were associating with their celestial being named Jesus".

Raphael Lataster, following Carrier, also argues that "Jesus began as a celestial messiah that certain Second Temple Jews already believed in, and was later allegorised in the Gospels."

===== Mainstream criticism =====
Ehrman notes that Doherty, like many other mythicists, "quotes professional scholars at length when their views prove useful for developing aspects of his argument, but he fails to point out that not a single of these scholars agrees with his overarching thesis." Ehrman has also criticized Doherty for misquoting scholarly sources as if in support of his celestial being-hypothesis, whereas those sources explicitly "[refer] to Christ becoming a human being in flesh on earth—precisely the view he rejects."

James McGrath criticizes Carrier, stating that Carrier is ignoring the details, adding that "Philo is offering an allusive reference to, and allegorical treatment of, a text in Zechariah which mentioned a historical high priest named Joshua." (Note: James McGrath (sept. 16, 2012), Further Problematizing Richard Carrier's Claims about Jesus)

According to Hurtado, for Paul and his contemporaries Jesus was a human being, who was exalted as Messiah and Lord after his crucifixion. According to Hurtado, "There is no evidence whatsoever of a 'Jewish archangel Jesus' in any of the second-temple Jewish evidence. ... Instead, all second-temple instances of the name are for historical figures." Hurtado rejects Carrier's claim that "Philo of Alexandria mentions an archangel named 'Jesus'", instead stating that Philo mentions a priestly figure called Joshua, and a royal personage whose name can be interpreted as "rising", among other connotations. According to Hurtado, there is no "Jesus Rising" in either Zechariah nor Philo. (Note: Larry Hurtado (December 7, 2017 ), Gee, Dr. Carrier, You're Really Upset!) (Note: Larry Huratdo (December 11, 2017 ), On Accurate Representation of Texts)

Ehrman notes that "there were no Jews prior to Christianity who thought that Isaiah 53 (or any of the other "suffering" passages) referred to the future messiah." Only after his death were these texts used to interpret his suffering in a meaningful way, though "Isaiah is not speaking about the future messiah, and he was never interpreted by any Jews prior to the first century as referring to the messiah." (Note: See also Carrier (2012a), "The Dying Messiah Question"; and #32 Richard Carrier and earliest Christians "copying" pre-dating Jewish concepts of a suffering & dying (for a purpose) messiah: Part 1.)

Simon Gathercole at Cambridge also evaluated the mythicist arguments for the claim that Paul believed in a heavenly, celestial Jesus who was never on Earth. Gathercole concludes that Carrier's arguments—and more broadly, the mythicist positions on different aspects of Paul's letters—are contradicted by the historical data and that Paul says a number of things regarding Jesus' life on Earth, his personality, family, etc.

==== Parallels with savior gods ====
===== Mainstream view =====
Jesus should be understood in the Palestinian and Jewish context of the first century AD. Most of the themes, epithets, and expectations formulated in the New Testamentical literature have Jewish origins and are elaborations of these themes. According to Hurtado, Roman-era Judaism refused "to worship any deities other than the God of Israel," including "any of the adjutants of the biblical God, such as angels, messiahs, etc." (Note: Larry Hurtado (29 June 2019), "Honoring the Son": An Entree Work) The Jesus-devotion which emerged in early Christianity should therefore be regarded as a specific, Christian innovation in the Jewish context.

===== Mythicist view =====
According to Wells, in his early years, Doherty, and Carrier, the mythical Jesus was derived from Wisdom traditions, the personification of an eternal aspect of God, who came to visit human beings. Doherty notes that the concept of a spiritual Christ was the result of common philosophical and religious ideas of the first and second century AD, in which the idea of an intermediary force between God and the world were common.

According to Doherty, the Christ of Paul shares similarities with the Greco-Roman mystery cults. Authors Timothy Freke and Peter Gandy argue that Jesus was a deity, akin to the mystery cults, while Dorothy Murdock argues that the Christ myth draws heavily on the Egyptian story of Osiris and Horus. According to Carrier, Jesus came from a tradition of "dying-and-rising" savior gods like Romulus, Osiris, and Zalmoxis. Along with Mithras, these gods were all the children of a higher god, underwent a passion, conquered death, and existed on Earth within human history.

Alvar Ellegård has argued that Paul's Jesus may have lived far earlier, in a dimly remembered remote past. Wells argues that Paul's Jesus did not have a definite historical moment in mind for when he was supposedly crucified. (Note: Wells 2004, p. 34: "My view is that Paul knew next to nothing of the earthly life of Jesus, and did not have in mind any definite historical moment for his crucifixion. As we saw, holy Jews had been crucified alive in the first and second centuries B.C., but traditions about these events, and about the persecuted Teacher of Righteousness, could well have reached Paul without reference to times and places, and he need not have regarded their occurrences as anything like as remote in time as they in fact were.")

According to Price, the Toledot Yeshu places Jesus "about 100 BCE", while Epiphanius of Salamis and the Talmud make references to "Jewish and Jewish-Christian belief" that Jesus lived about a century earlier than usually assumed. According to Price, this implies that "perhaps the Jesus figure was at first an ahistorical myth and various attempts were made to place him in a plausible historical context, just as Herodotus and others tried to figure out when Hercules 'must have' lived". (Note: According to Epiphanius in his Panarion, (Note: Panarion 29.5.6) the fourth-century Jewish-Christian Nazarenes (Ναζωραιοι) were originally Jewish converts of the Apostles. Richard Carrier contends that "Epiphanius, in Panarion 29, says there was a sect of still-Torah-observant Christians who taught that Jesus lived and died in the time of Jannaeus, and all the Jewish sources on Christianity that we have (from the Talmud to the Toledot Yeshu) report no other view than that Jesus lived during the time of Jannaeus".)

===== Mainstream criticism =====
Mainstream scholarship disagrees with these interpretations, and regards them as outdated applications of ideas and methodologies from the Religionsgeschichtliche Schule. According to Philip Davies, the Jesus of the New Testament is indeed "composed of stock motifs (and mythic types) drawn from all over the Mediterranean and Near Eastern world" but this does not mean that Jesus was "invented"; according to Davies, "the existence of a guru of some kind is more plausible and economical than any other explanation". Ehrman states that mythicists make too much of the perceived parallels with pagan religions and mythologies. According to Ehrman, critical-historical research has clearly shown the Jewish roots and influences of Christianity.

According to historian of religion Jonathan Z. Smith, modern scholars hold that the "dying and rising gods" trope is wrong since early sources on numerous gods show that gods who have died, do not resurrect or even go through rebirth. Furthermore, claims of dying and resurrected gods is based on dubious reconstructions of later sources since early indigenous sources never make such claims, and there is no clear instance of a dying and rising deity.

Many mainstream biblical scholars respond that most of the perceived parallels with mystery religions are either coincidences or without historical basis and/or that these parallels do not prove that a Jesus figure did not live. (Note: In particular, the transformations faced by deities have distinct differences from the resurrection of Jesus. Osiris regains consciousness as king of the underworld, rather than being "transformed into an eschatological new creation" as Craig S. Keener writes. While Jesus was born from a human woman (traditionally a virgin) and accompanied by shepherds, Mitra is born (unaccompanied by shepherds) from the goddess Aditi (to whom the word "virgin" is only rarely, loosely, and indirectly applied in a highly poetic sense), while Mithras (granted, accompanied by shepherds later) emerges full-grown from a rock. The rebirth of many of these deities was a clear metaphor for the renewal of spring that repeated the death every year, rather than a historic event meant to proclaim the god's cancellation of death. Some of these parallels appear after Christianity (e.g. the earliest references to Adonis rising from the dead is in the second century AD, Attis a century later), and are often only known through later Christian sources. Most other and later parallels were made in the works of James George Frazer, or may be guilty of parallelomania and even misrepresentation of religious (both Christian and non-Christian) and linguistic sources (for example, ignoring the false cognate relationship between Christ and Krishna).) Boyd and Eddy doubt that Paul viewed Jesus similar to the savior deities found in ancient mystery religions. Ehrman notes that Doherty proposes that the mystery cults had a neo-Platonic cosmology, but that Doherty gives no evidence for this assertion. Furthermore, "the mystery cults are never mentioned by Paul or by any other Christian author of the first hundred years of the Church," nor did they play a role in the worldview of any of the Jewish groups of the first century.

Boyd and Eddy criticize the idea that "Paul viewed Jesus as a cosmic savior who lived in the past", referring to various passages in the Pauline epistles that seem to contradict this idea. In Galatians 1:19, Paul says he met with James, the "Lord's brother"; 1 Corinthians 15:3–8 refers to people to whom Jesus' had appeared, and who were Paul's contemporaries; and in 1 Thessalonians 2:14–16 Paul refers to the Jews "who both killed the Lord Jesus" and "drove out us" as the same people, indicating that the death of Jesus was within the same timeframe as the persecution of Paul.

== Late 18th to early 20th century ==
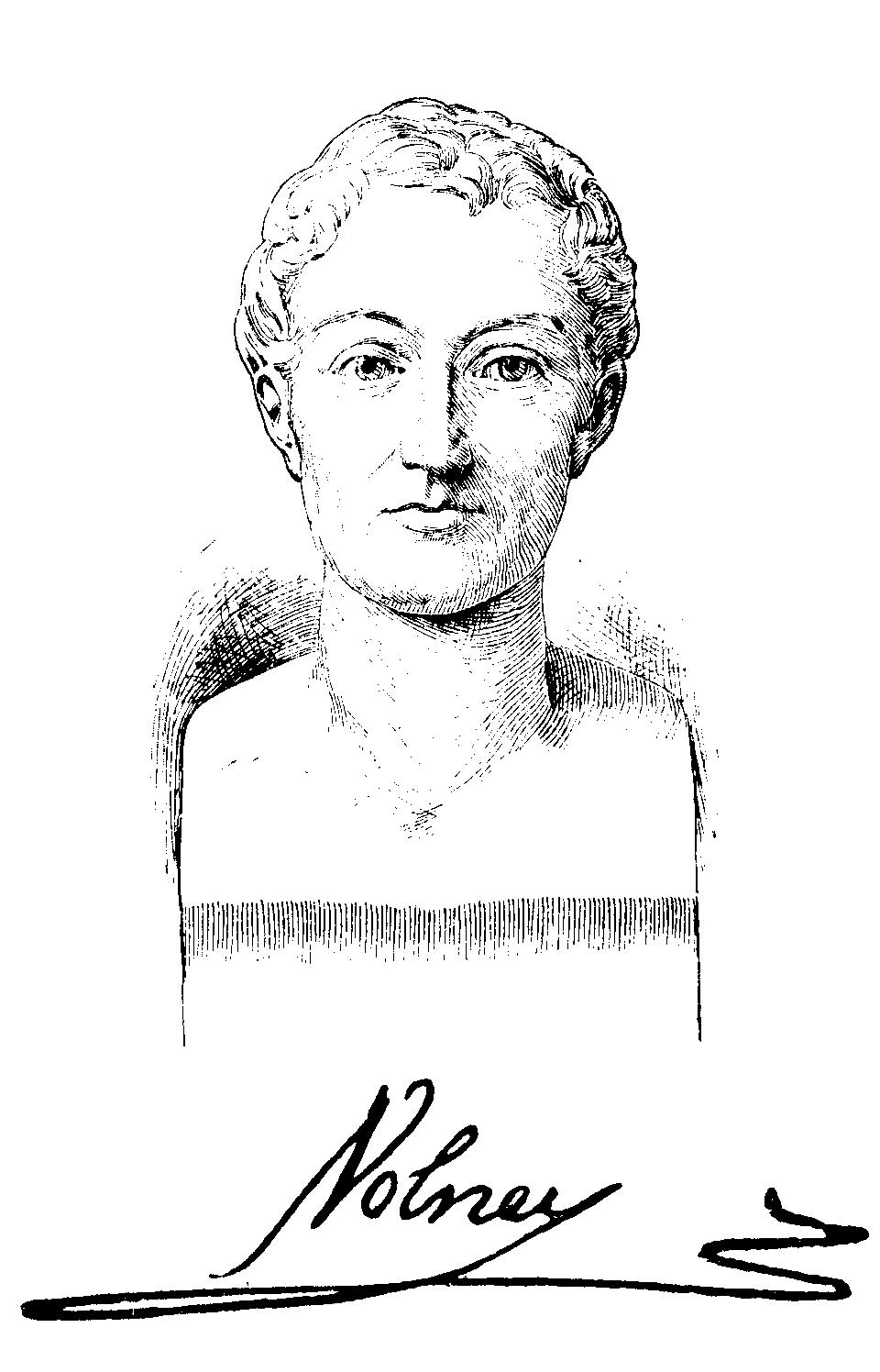
French historian Constantin-François Volney, one of the earliest myth theorists

According to Van Voorst, "The argument that Jesus never existed, but was invented by the Christian movement around the year 100, goes back to Enlightenment times, when the historical-critical study of the past was born", and may have originated with Lord Bolingbroke, an English deist.

According to Walter Weaver, the beginnings of the formal denial of the existence of Jesus can be traced to late 18th-century France with the works of Constantin François Chassebœuf de Volney and Charles-François Dupuis. Volney and Dupuis argued that Christianity was an amalgamation of various ancient mythologies and that Jesus was a totally mythical character. Dupuis argued that ancient rituals in Syria, Egypt, Mesopotamia, Persia, and India had influenced the Christian story which was allegorized as the histories of solar deities, such as Sol Invictus. Dupuis also said that the resurrection of Jesus was an allegory for the growth of the sun's strength in the sign of Aries at the spring equinox. Volney argued that Abraham and Sarah were derived from Brahma and his wife Saraswati, and that Christ was related to Krishna. Volney made use of a draft version of Dupuis' work and at times differed from him, for example, in arguing that the gospel stories were not intentionally created, but were compiled organically. Volney's perspective became associated with the ideas of the French Revolution, which hindered the acceptance of these views in England. Despite this, his work gathered significant following among British and American radical thinkers during the 19th century.

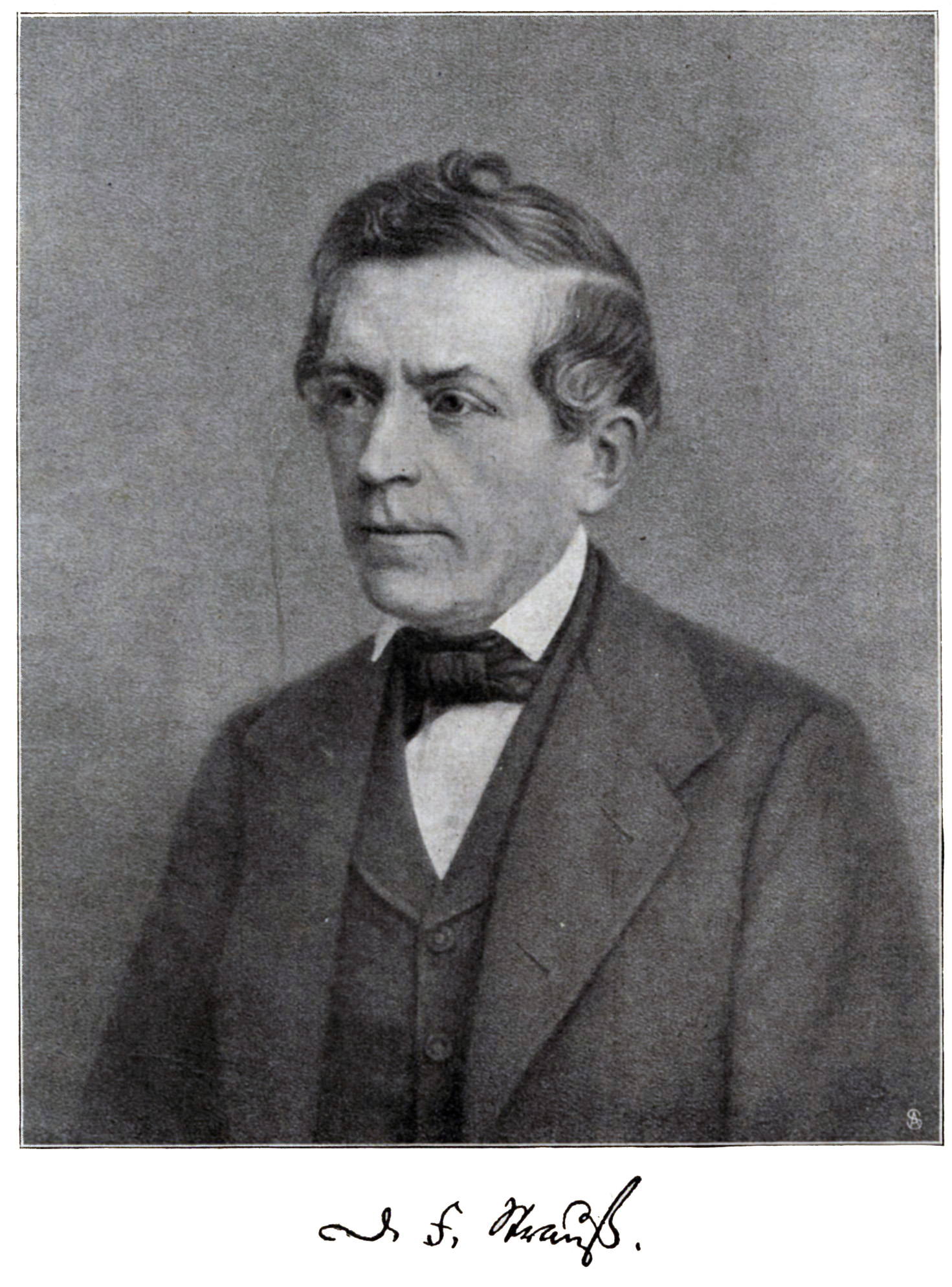
David Strauss

In 1835, David Strauss published his extremely controversial The Life of Jesus, Critically Examined (Das Leben Jesu). According to Elisabeth Hurt, Strauss "arrived at a Christianity depersonalized and anonymous, reducing Jesus to nothing more than a gifted genius whom legend had gradually deified." While not denying that Jesus existed, he did argue that the miracles in the New Testament were mythical additions with little basis in fact. According to Strauss, the early church developed these stories in order to present Jesus as the Messiah of the Jewish prophecies. This perspective was in opposition to the prevailing views of Strauss' time: rationalism, which explained the miracles as misinterpretations of non-supernatural events, and the supernaturalist view that the biblical accounts were entirely accurate. Strauss' third way, in which the miracles are explained as myths developed by early Christians to support their evolving conception of Jesus, heralded a new epoch in the textual and historical treatment of the rise of Christianity.

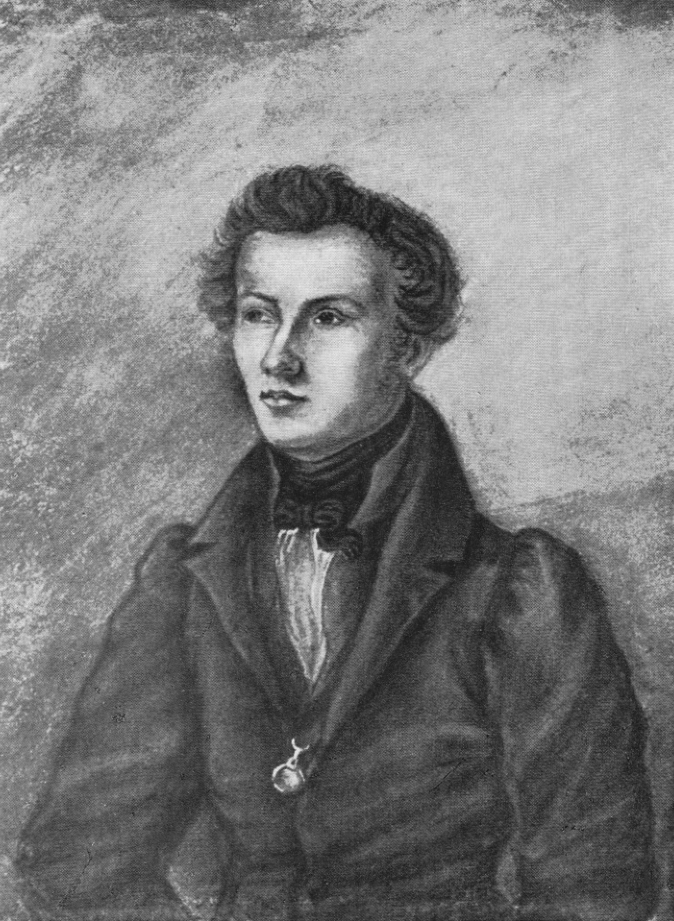
Bruno Bauer

German Bruno Bauer, who taught at the University of Bonn, took Strauss' arguments further and became the first author to systematically argue that Jesus did not exist. Beginning in 1841 with his Criticism of the Gospel History of the Synoptics, Bauer argued that Jesus was primarily a literary figure, but left open the question of whether a historical Jesus existed at all. Then in his Criticism of the Pauline Epistles (1850–1852) and in A Critique of the Gospels and a History of their Origin (1850–1851), Bauer argued that Jesus had not existed. Bauer's work was heavily criticized at the time, as in 1839 he was removed from his position at the University of Bonn and his work did not have much impact on future myth theorists.

In his two-volume, 867-page book Anacalypsis (1836), English gentleman Godfrey Higgins said that "the mythos of the Hindus, the mythos of the Jews and the mythos of the Greeks are all at bottom the same; and are contrivances under the appearance of histories to perpetuate doctrines", and that Christian editors "either from roguery or folly, corrupted them all". In his 1875 book The World's Sixteen Crucified Saviors, American Kersey Graves said that many demigods from different countries shared similar stories, traits or quotes as Jesus and he used Higgins as the main source for his arguments. The validity of the claims in the book have been greatly criticized by Christ myth proponents including Richard Carrier, and are largely dismissed by biblical scholars.

Starting in the 1870s, English poet and author Gerald Massey became interested in Egyptology and reportedly taught himself Egyptian hieroglyphics at the British Museum. In 1883, Massey published The Natural Genesis, in which he asserted parallels between Jesus and the Egyptian god Horus. His other major work, Ancient Egypt: The Light of the World, was published shortly before his death in 1907. His assertions have influenced various later writers such as Alvin Boyd Kuhn and Tom Harpur.

In the 1870s and 1880s, a group of scholars associated with the University of Amsterdam, known in German scholarship as the Radical Dutch school, rejected the authenticity of the Pauline epistles and took a generally negative view of the Bible's historical value. Abraham Dirk Loman argued in 1881 that all New Testament writings belonged to the second century and doubted that Jesus was a historical figure, but later said the core of the gospels was genuine.

Additional early Christ myth proponents included Swiss skeptic Rudolf Steck, English historian Edwin Johnson, English radical Reverend Robert Taylor and his associate Richard Carlile.

During the early 20th century, several writers published arguments against Jesus' historicity, often drawing on the work of liberal theologians, who tended to deny any value to sources for Jesus outside the New Testament and limited their attention to Mark and the hypothetical Q source. They also made use of the growing field of religious history which found sources for Christian ideas in Greek and Oriental mystery cults, rather than Judaism. (Note: Joseph Klausner wrote that biblical scholars "tried their hardest to find in the historic Jesus something which is not Judaism; but in his actual history they have found nothing of this whatever, since this history is reduced almost to zero. It is therefore no wonder that at the beginning of this century there has been a revival of the eighteenth and nineteenth century view that Jesus never existed".)

The work of social anthropologist James George Frazer has also influenced various myth theorists, although Frazer himself believed that Jesus existed. In 1890, Frazer published the first edition of The Golden Bough which attempted to define the shared elements of religious belief. This work became the basis of many later authors who argued that the story of Jesus was a fiction created by Christians. After a number of people claimed that he was a myth theorist, in the 1913 expanded edition of The Golden Bough he expressly stated that his position assumed a historical Jesus.

In 1900, Scottish Member of Parliament John Mackinnon Robertson argued that Jesus never existed, but was an invention by a first-century messianic cult of Joshua, whom he identifies as a solar deity. The English school master George Robert Stowe Mead argued in 1903 that Jesus had existed, but that he had lived in 100 BC. Mead based his argument on the Talmud, which pointed to Jesus being crucified c. 100 BC. In Mead's view, this would mean that the Christian gospels are mythical.

In 1909, school teacher John Eleazer Remsburg published The Christ, which made a distinction between a possible historical Jesus (Jesus of Nazareth) and the Jesus of the Gospels (Jesus of Bethlehem). Remsburg thought that there was good reason to believe that the historical Jesus existed, but that the "Christ of Christianity" was a mythological creation. Remsburg compiled a list of 42 names of "writers who lived and wrote during the time, or within a century after the time" who Remsburg felt should have written about Jesus if the gospel accounts were reasonably accurate, but who did not.

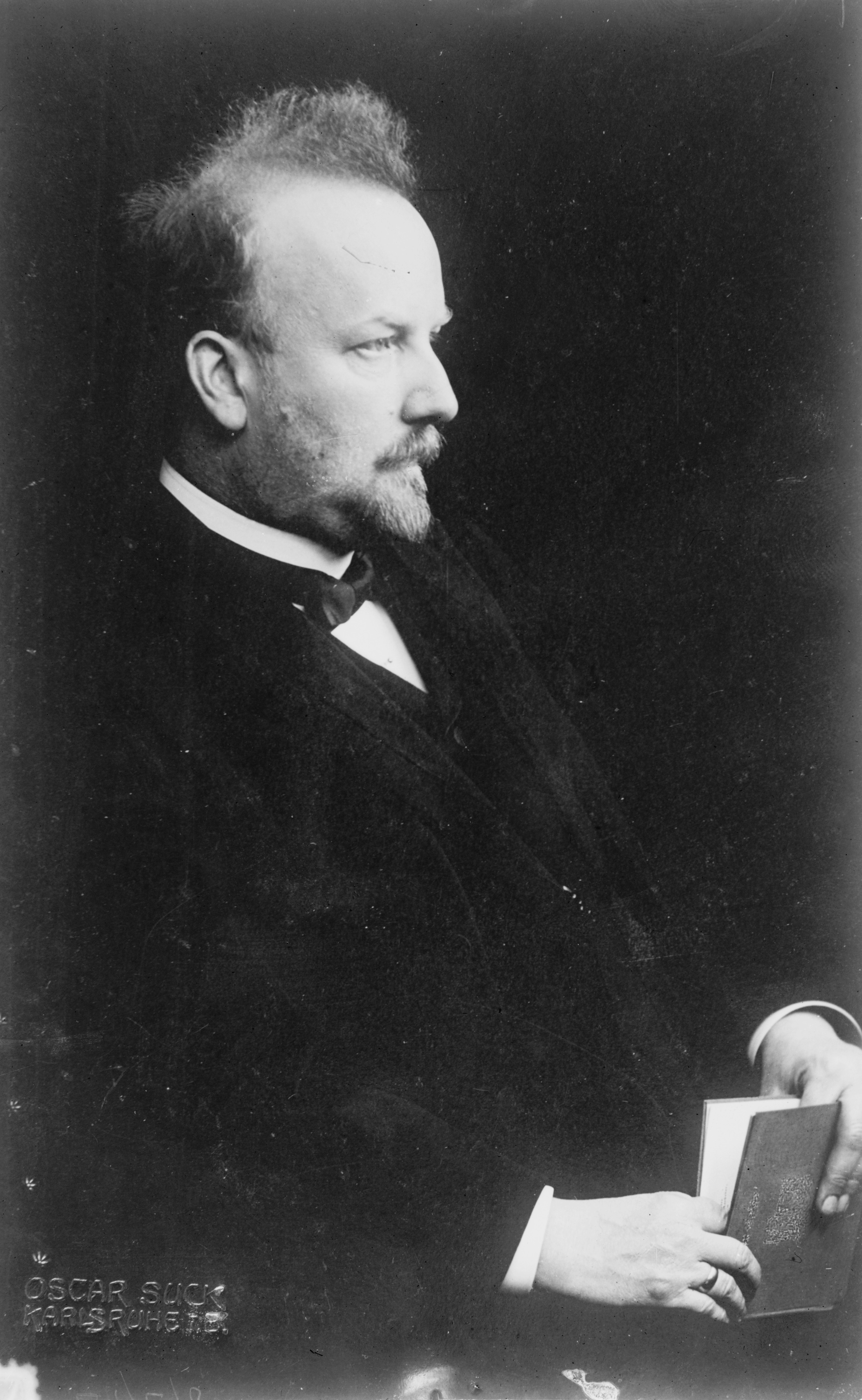
Arthur Drews

Also in 1909, German philosophy Professor Christian Heinrich Arthur Drews wrote The Christ Myth to argue that Christianity had been a Jewish Gnostic cult that spread by appropriating aspects of Greek philosophy and life-death-rebirth deities. In his later books The Witnesses to the Historicity of Jesus (1912) and The Denial of the Historicity of Jesus in Past and Present (1926), Drews reviewed the biblical scholarship of his time, as well as the work of other myth theorists, attempting to show that everything reported about the historical Jesus had a mythical character. (Note: Drews' work found fertile soil in the Soviet Union, where Marxist–Leninist atheism was the official doctrine of the state. Soviet leader Lenin argued that it was imperative in the struggle against religious obscurantists to form a union with people like Drews. Several editions of Drews' The Christ Myth were published in the Soviet Union from the early 1920s onwards and his arguments were included in school and university textbooks. Public meetings asking "Did Christ live?" were organized, during which party operatives debated with clergymen.)

== Revival (1970s–present) ==
Beginning in the 1970s, in the aftermath of the second quest for the historical Jesus, interest in the Christ myth theory was revived by George A. Wells, whose ideas were elaborated by Earl Doherty. With the rise of the internet in the 1990s, their ideas gained popular interest, giving way to a multitude of publications and websites aimed at a popular audience, most notably Richard Carrier, often taking a polemical stance toward Christianity. Their ideas are supported by Robert Price, an academic theologian, while somewhat different stances on the mythological origins are offered by Thomas L. Thompson and Thomas L. Brodie, both also accomplished scholars in theology.

=== Revival of the Christ myth theory ===
==== Paul-Louis Couchoud ====
The French philosopher Paul-Louis Couchoud (1879–1959), who published in the 1920s and 1930s, was a predecessor for contemporary mythicists. According to Couchoud, Christianity started not with a biography of Jesus but "a collective mystical experience, sustaining a divine history mystically revealed". Couchaud's Jesus is therefore a "religious conception", rather than a "myth" in the strictest sense.

Robert Price mentions Couchoud's comment on the Christ Hymn, one of the relics of the Christ cults to which Paul converted. Couchoud noted that in this hymn the name Jesus was given to the Christ after his death, implying that there cannot have been a ministry by a teacher called Jesus.

==== George Albert Wells ====
George Albert Wells (1926–2017), a professor of German, revived interest in the Christ myth theory. In his early work, including Did Jesus Exist? (1975), Wells argued that because the gospels were written decades after Jesus' death by Christians who were theologically motivated but had no personal knowledge of him, a rational person should believe the gospels only if they are independently confirmed.

From the mid-1990s onwards, Wells came to accept that the Jesus of the gospel stories was partly based on a historical figure. In The Jesus Myth (1999) and later works, Wells argues that two Jesus narratives were fused into one, namely Paul's mythical Jesus, and a historical Jesus from a Galilean preaching tradition, whose teachings were preserved in the Q source. According to Wells, both figures owe much of their substance to ideas from Jewish Wisdom literature.

In 2000, Van Voorst gave an overview of proponents of the "Nonexistence Hypothesis" and their arguments, presenting seven arguments against the hypothesis as put forward by Wells and his predecessors, detailing his criticisms. According to Maurice Casey, Wells' work repeated the main points of the Religionsgeschichtliche Schule, which are deemed outdated by mainstream scholarship. His works were not discussed by New Testament scholars, because it was "not considered to be original, and all his main points were thought to have been refuted long ago, for reasons which were very well known".

==== Earl Doherty ====
Canadian writer Earl Doherty (born 1941) was introduced to the Christ myth theme by a lecture by Wells in the 1970s. Doherty follows the lead of Wells, but disagrees on the historicity of Jesus, arguing that "everything in Paul points to a belief in an entirely divine Son who 'lived' and acted in the spiritual realm, in the same mythical setting in which all the other savior deities of the day were seen to operate". (Note: According to Doherty, it was Paul's view that Jesus' death took place in the spiritual not the earthly realm. According to Ehrman, not only is there "no evidence to support Doherty's assertion of what Paul's view of Jesus was", but there are also "a host of reasons for calling Doherty's view into serious question".) According to Doherty, Paul's Christ originated as a myth derived from middle Platonism with some influence from Jewish mysticism and belief in a historical Jesus emerged only among Christian communities in the second century. Doherty agrees with Richard Bauckham that the earliest Christology was already a "high Christology", that is, Jesus was an incarnation of the pre-existent Christ, but deems it "hardly credible" that such a belief could develop in such a short time among the Jews. Therefore, Doherty concludes that Christianity started with the myth of this incarnated Christ, who was subsequently historicised. According to Doherty, the nucleus of this historicised Jesus of the Gospels can be found in the Jesus-movement that wrote the Q source. Eventually, Q's Jesus and Paul's Christ were combined in the Gospel of Mark by a predominantly gentile community. In time, the gospel narrative of this embodiment of Wisdom became interpreted as the literal history of the life of Jesus.

Eddy and Boyd characterize Doherty's work as appealing to the "History of Religions School". In a book criticizing the Christ myth theory, New Testament scholar Maurice Casey describes Doherty as "perhaps the most influential of all the mythicists", but one who is unable to understand the ancient texts he uses in his arguments.

==== Richard Carrier ====
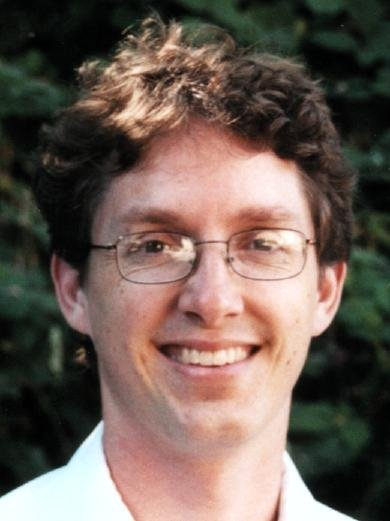
Richard Carrier

American independent scholar Richard Carrier (born 1969) reviewed Doherty's work on the origination of Jesus and eventually concluded that the evidence favored the core of Doherty's thesis. According to Carrier, following Couchoud and Doherty, Christianity started with the belief in a new deity called Jesus, "a spiritual, mythical figure". According to Carrier, this new deity was fleshed out in the gospels, which added a narrative framework and Cynic-like teachings, and eventually came to be perceived as a historical biography. Carrier argues in his book On the Historicity of Jesus: Why We Might Have Reason for Doubt that the Jesus figure was probably originally known only through private revelations and hidden messages in scripture, which were then crafted into a historical figure to communicate the claims of the gospels allegorically. Those allegories were subsequently believed as fact during the struggle for control of the Christian churches of the first century. Citing the methodological failure of the criteria of authenticity and asserting a failure of the "entire quest for criteria", Richard Carrier writes, "The entire field of Jesus studies has thus been left without any valid method."

=== Biblical scholars ===
==== Robert M. Price ====
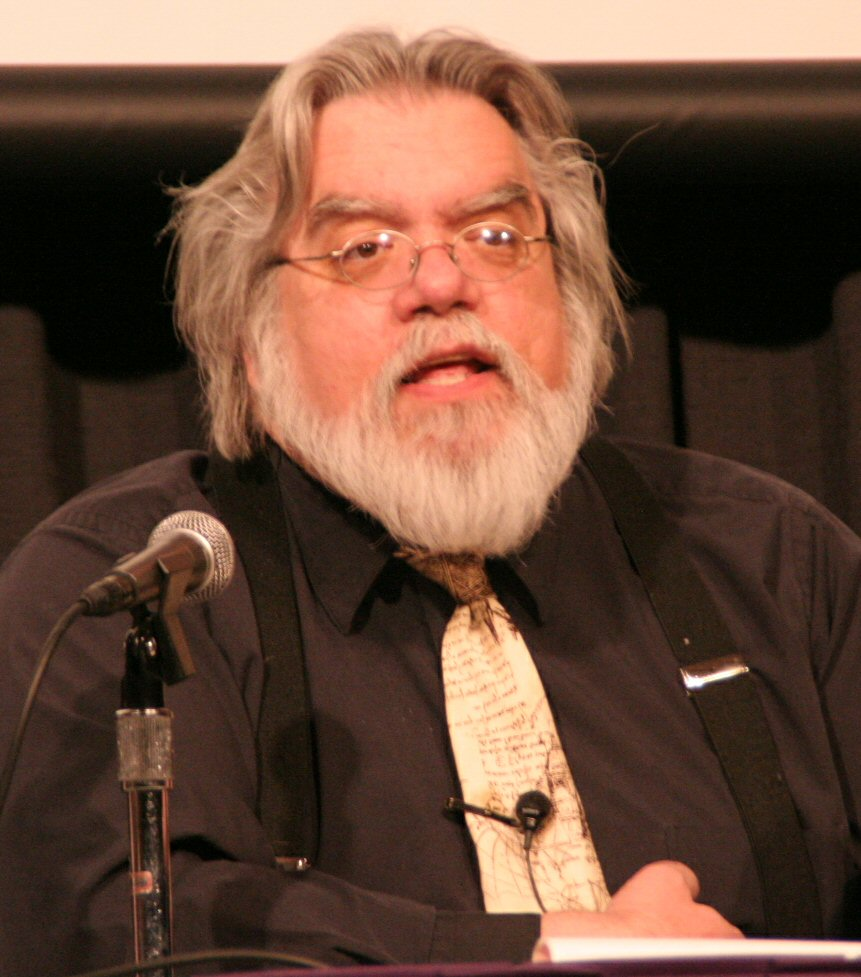
American New Testament scholar Robert M. Price

American New Testament scholar and former Baptist pastor Robert M. Price (born 1954) has questioned the historicity of Jesus in a series of books, including Deconstructing Jesus (2000), The Incredible Shrinking Son of Man (2003), Jesus Is Dead (2007) and The Christ-Myth Theory and Its Problems (2011). Price uses critical-historical methods, but also uses "history-of-religions parallel[s]", or the "Principle of Analogy", to show similarities between gospel narratives and non-Christian Middle Eastern myths. Price criticises some of the criteria of critical Bible research, such as the criterion of dissimilarity and the criterion of embarrassment. Price further notes that "consensus is no criterion" for the historicity of Jesus. According to Price, if critical methodology is applied with ruthless consistency, one is left in complete agnosticism regarding Jesus' historicity. (Note: Price: "One wonders if all these scholars came to a certain point and stopped, their assumption being "If Jesus was a historical figure, he must have done and said something!" But their own criteria and critical tools, which we have sought to apply here with ruthless consistency, ought to have left them with complete agnosticism.)

In Deconstructing Jesus, Price claims that the Jesus of the New Testament is a "composite figure" out of which a broad variety of historical Jesuses can be reconstructed, any one of which may have been the real Jesus, but not all of them together. According to Price, various Jesus images flowed together at the origin of Christianity, some of them possibly based on myth, some of them possibly based on a historical "Jesus the Nazorean", and that the historical Jesus has become obscured behind the dogma. Price concluded that it is plausible that there might have been a historical Jesus, whose story was completely assimilated into the "Mythic Hero Archetype", but that it was no longer possible to be sure there had ever been a real person underneath all the fiction.

In Jesus is Dead (2007) Price again stated the possibility that the gospel Jesus is not based on a historical individual, and that the "Christ of faith" is "a synthetic construct of theologians".

In his later contribution, "Jesus at the Vanishing Point", appearing in The Historical Jesus: Five Views (2009), Price concludes that the gospel story is a "tapestry of Scripture quotes from the Old Testament." He further states that the gospel story also incorporates many of the recurrent features of the Indo-European and Semitic hero myths—what Price calls the "Mythic Hero Archetype". Price acknowledges that he stands against the majority view of scholars, but cautions against attempting to settle the issue by appeal to the majority.

==== Thomas L. Thompson ====
Thomas L. Thompson (born 1939), professor emeritus of theology at the University of Copenhagen, is a leading biblical minimalist of the Old Testament. According to Thompson, "questions of understanding and interpreting biblical texts" are more relevant than "questions about the historical existence of individuals such as ... Jesus". In his view, Jesus' existence is based more on theological necessity than historical evidence. He believes that most theologians accept that large parts of the Gospels are not to be taken at face value, while also treating the historicity of Jesus as not an open question. In his 2007 book The Messiah Myth: The Near Eastern Roots of Jesus and David, Thompson argues that the biblical accounts of both King David and Jesus of Nazareth are not historical accounts, but are mythical in nature and based on Mesopotamian, Egyptian, Babylonian and Greek and Roman literature. Those accounts are based on the Messiah mytheme, a king anointed by God to restore the Divine order at Earth. Thompson also argues that the resurrection of Jesus is taken directly from the story of the dying and rising god, Dionysus. Thompson concludes, "A negative statement, however, that such a figure did not exist, cannot be reached: only that we have no warrant for making such a figure part of our history."

Thompson co-edited the contributions from a diverse range of scholars in the 2012 book Is This Not the Carpenter?: The Question of the Historicity of the Figure of Jesus. In the introduction he writes, "The essays collected in this volume have a modest purpose. Neither establishing the historicity of a historical Jesus nor possessing an adequate warrant for dismissing it, our purpose is to clarify our engagement with critical historical and exegetical methods."

Ehrman (Note: (Ehrman 2012, pp. 11, 15) "[Per "A Brief History of Mythicism"] ... some of the more influential contemporary representatives who have revitalized the [Mythicism] view in recent years. ... A different sort of support for a mythicist position comes in the work of Thomas L. Thompson, The Messiah Myth: The Near Eastern Roots of Jesus and David. Thompson is trained in biblical studies, but he does not have degrees in New Testament or early Christianity. He is, instead, a Hebrew Bible scholar who teaches at the University of Copenhagen in Denmark. In his own field of expertise, he is convinced that figures from the Hebrew Bible such as Abraham, Moses, and David never existed. He transfers these views to the New Testament and argues that Jesus too did not exist but was invented by Christians who wanted to create a savior figure out of stories found in the Jewish scriptures.") (Note: Casey 2014, pp. 10, 24: "I introduce here the most influential mythicists who claim to be 'scholars', though I would question their competence and qualifications [...] [Thomas L. Thompson] was Professor of Theology at the University of Copenhagen from 1993–2009. His early work, which is thought to have successfully refuted the attempts of Albright and others to defend the historicity of the most ancient parts of biblical literature history, is said to have negatively affected his future job prospects.") and Casey have characterized Thompson's position as mythicist, and Ehrman has criticised Thompson, questioning his qualifications and expertise regarding New Testament research. In a 2012 online article, Thompson defended his qualifications to address New Testament issues, and objected to Ehrman's statement that "[a] different sort of support for a mythicist position comes in the work of Thomas L. Thompson." (Note: Ehrman (2012), Did Jesus Exist? 336–37) According to Thompson, "Bart Ehrman has attributed to my book arguments and principles which I had never presented, certainly not that Jesus had never existed", and reiterated his position that the issue of Jesus' existence cannot be determined one way or the other. Thompson further states that Jesus is not to be regarded as "the notoriously stereotypical figure of ... (mistaken) eschatological prophet", as Ehrman does, but is modelled on "the royal figure of a conquering messiah", derived from Jewish writings. In response to Thompson's article, Maurice Casey dismissed Thompson as "an incompetent New Testament scholar".

==== Thomas L. Brodie ====
In 2012, the Irish Dominican priest and theologian Thomas L. Brodie (1940-2026), holding a PhD from the Pontifical University of St. Thomas Aquinas in Rome and a co-founder and former director of the Dominican Biblical Institute in Limerick, published Beyond the Quest for the Historical Jesus: Memoir of a Discovery. In this book, Brodie, who previously had published academic works on the Hebrew prophets, argued that the gospels are essentially a rewriting of the stories of Elijah and Elisha when viewed as a unified account in the Books of Kings. This view led Brodie to the conclusion that Jesus is mythical. Brodie's argument builds on his previous work, in which he stated that rather than being separate and fragmented, the stories of Elijah and Elisha are united and that 1 Kings 16:29 – 2 Kings 13:25 is a natural extension of 1 Kings 17 – 2 Kings 8 which have a coherence not generally observed by other biblical scholars. Brodie then views the Elijah–Elisha story as the underlying model for the gospel narratives.

In response to Brodie's publication of his view that Jesus was mythical, the Dominican order banned him from writing and lecturing, although he was allowed to stay on as a brother of the Irish Province, which continued to care for him. According to Gerard Norton, "There is an unjustifiable jump between methodology and conclusion" in Brodie's book that "are not soundly based on scholarship". According to Norton, they are "a memoir of a series of significant moments or events" in Brodie's life that reinforced "his core conviction" that neither Jesus nor Paul of Tarsus were historical.

=== Other modern proponents ===
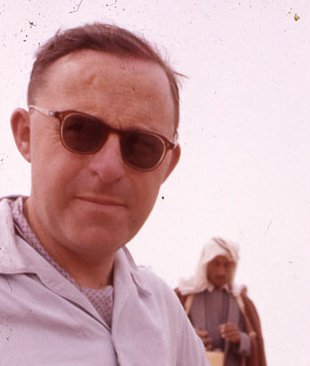
British academic John M. Allegro

In his books The Sacred Mushroom and the Cross (1970) and The Dead Sea Scrolls and the Christian Myth (1979), British archaeologist and philologist John M. Allegro advanced the view that stories of early Christianity originated in a shamanistic Essene clandestine cult centered around the use of hallucinogenic mushrooms. He also argued that the story of Jesus was based on the crucifixion of the Teacher of Righteousness in the Dead Sea Scrolls. Allegro's position was criticised sharply by Welsh historian Philip Jenkins, who wrote that Allegro relied on texts that did not exist in quite the form he was citing them. Based on this and many other negative reactions to the book, Allegro's publisher later apologized for issuing the book and Allegro was forced to resign his academic post.

Alvar Ellegård, in The Myth of Jesus (1992), and Jesus: One Hundred Years Before Christ. A Study in Creative Mythology (1999), argued that Jesus lived 100 years before the accepted dates, and was a teacher of the Essenes. According to Ellegård, Paul was connected with the Essenes, and had a vision of this Jesus.

Timothy Freke and Peter Gandy, in their 1999 publication The Jesus Mysteries: Was the "Original Jesus" a Pagan God? propose that Jesus did not exist as a historically identifiable individual, but was instead a syncretic re-interpretation of the fundamental pagan "godman" by the Gnostics, who were the original sect of Christianity. The book has been negatively received by scholars, and also by Christ mythicists.

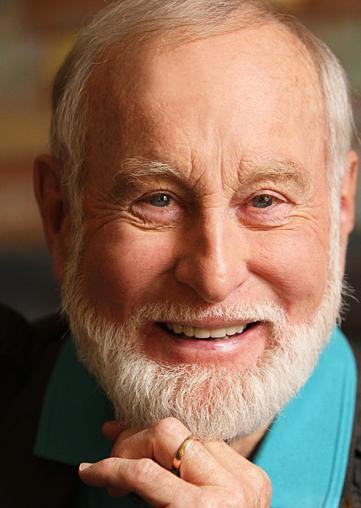
Canadian author Tom Harpur

Influenced by Massey and Higgins, Alvin Boyd Kuhn (1880–1963), an American Theosophist, argued an Egyptian etymology to the Bible that the gospels were symbolic rather than historic and that church leaders started to misinterpret the New Testament in the third century. Building on Kuhn's work, author and ordained priest Tom Harpur in his 2004 book The Pagan Christ listed similarities among the stories of Jesus, Horus, Mithras, Buddha and others. According to Harpur, in the second or third centuries the early church created the fictional impression of a literal and historic Jesus and then used forgery and violence to cover up the evidence. (Note: Harpur's book received a great deal of criticism, including a response book, Unmasking the Pagan Christ: An Evangelical Response to the Cosmic Christ Idea. Fellow mythicist Robert M. Price also wrote a negative review, saying that he did not agree that the Egyptian parallels were as forceful as Harpur thought. In 2007, Harpur published a sequel, Water Into Wine.)

In 2014, Raphael Lataster, a lecturer in religious philosophy at the University of Sydney wrote an opinion piece in The Conversation and The Washington Post, stating that the historical evidence for the existence of Jesus of Nazareth "just doesn't add up" and that "there are clearly good reasons to doubt the existence of Jesus". His works were met with widespread criticism from the scholarly community. (Note: John Dickson, Honorary Fellow of the Department of Ancient History at Macquarie University and once a teacher of Lataster himself, wrote on ABC News that "as his former lecturer, I am somewhat embarrassed to admit that Raphael's 1000 words on Jesus would not receive a pass mark in any history class I can imagine, even if it were meant to be a mere "personal reflection" on contemporary Jesus scholarship"; Dickson also accused Lataster of distorting the truth to support his views (such as claiming that there is a scholarly debate about the historicity of Jesus, while in fact there is no debate about it) or stating that many scholars believe that the description of Jesus in the Pauline Epistles is believed to be celestial and uncorporeal (a view that is actually rejected by the scholarly consensus).) His 2019 peer-reviewed publication Questioning the historicity of Jesus received negative reviews.

The Christ myth theory enjoyed brief popularity in the Soviet Union, where it was supported by Sergey Kovalev, Alexander Kazhdan, Abram Ranovich, Nikolai Rumyantsev and Robert Vipper. However, several scholars, including Kazhdan, later retracted their views about a mythical Jesus, and by the end of the 1980s Iosif Kryvelev remained as virtually the only proponent of the Christ myth theory in Soviet academia.

== Reception ==
=== Scholarly reception ===
==== Lack of support for mythicism ====
In modern scholarship, the Christ myth theory is considered a fringe theory, and finds virtually no support from scholars, to the point of being addressed in footnotes or almost completely ignored due to the obvious weaknesses they espouse. Common criticisms against the Christ myth theory include: general lack of expertise or relationship to academic institutions and current scholarship; reliance on arguments from silence, lack of evidence, dismissal or distortion of what sources actually state, questionable methodologies, and outdated or superficial comparisons with mythologies.

According to scholar Bart D. Ehrman, nearly all scholars who study the early Christian period believe that Jesus did exist, and Ehrman observes that mythicist writings are generally of poor quality because they are usually authored by amateurs and non-scholars who have no academic credentials or have never taught at academic institutions. Maurice Casey, a scholar of New Testament and early Christianity, stated that the belief among professors that Jesus existed is generally completely certain. According to Casey, the view that Jesus did not exist is "the view of extremists", "demonstrably false" and "professional scholars generally regard it as having been settled in serious scholarship long ago".

In 1977, classical historian and popular author Michael Grant in his book Jesus: An Historian's Review of the Gospels, concluded that "modern critical methods fail to support the Christ-myth theory". In support, Grant quoted Roderic Dunkerley's 1957 opinion that the Christ myth theory has "again and again been answered and annihilated by first-rank scholars". He also quoted Otto Betz' 1968 opinion that in recent years "no serious scholar has ventured to postulate the non-historicity of Jesus—or at any rate very few, and they have not succeeded in disposing of the much stronger, indeed very abundant, evidence to the contrary". In the same book, he also wrote:

If we apply to the New Testament, as we should, the same sort of criteria as we should apply to other ancient writings containing historical material, we can no more reject Jesus' existence than we can reject the existence of a mass of pagan personages whose reality as historical figures is never questioned.

Graeme Clarke, emeritus Professor of Classical Ancient History and Archaeology at Australian National University stated in 2008: "Frankly, I know of no ancient historian or biblical historian who would have a twinge of doubt about the existence of a Jesus Christ—the documentary evidence is simply overwhelming". R. Joseph Hoffmann, who had created the Jesus Project, which included both mythicists and historicists to investigate the historicity of Jesus, wrote that an adherent to the Christ myth theory asked to set up a separate section of the project for those committed to the position. Hoffmann felt that to be committed to mythicism signaled a lack of necessary skepticism and he noted that most members of the project did not reach the mythicist conclusion. Hoffmann also called the mythicist theory "fatally flawed". (Note: Hoffmann 2012: "This essay is in part an attempt to clarify procedural issues relevant to what is sometimes called the 'Christ-myth' or 'Non-historicity' thesis—an argumentative approach to the New Testament based on the theory that the historical Jesus of Nazareth did not exist. I have come to regard this thesis as fatally flawed and subject to a variety of objections that are not often highlighted in the academic writings of New Testament scholars. ... It is my view, simply stated, that while facts concerning the Jesus of history were jeopardized from the start by a variety of salvation myths, by the credulity of early believers, by the historiographical tendencies of the era, and by the editorial tendencies of early writers, the gospels retain a stubbornly historical view of Jesus, preserve reliable information about his life and teachings, and are not engulfed by any of the conditions under which they were composed. Jesus "the Nazarene" did not originate as a myth or a story without historical coordinates, but as a teacher in first century Roman Palestine.")

Philip Jenkins, Distinguished Professor of History at Baylor University, wrote, "What you can't do, though, without venturing into the far swamps of extreme crankery, is to argue that Jesus never existed. The 'Christ-Myth Hypothesis' is not scholarship, and is not taken seriously in respectable academic debate. The grounds advanced for the 'hypothesis' are worthless. The authors proposing such opinions might be competent, decent, honest individuals, but the views they present are demonstrably wrong. ... Jesus is better documented and recorded than pretty much any non-elite figure of antiquity."

According to Daniel Gullotta, most of the mythicist literature contains "wild theories, which are poorly researched, historically inaccurate, and written with a sensationalist bent for popular audiences."

According to James F. McGrath and Christopher Hansen, mythicists sometimes rely on questionable and outdated methods like Rank and Raglan mythotypes that end up resulting in misclassifying real historical persons as mythical figures.

==== Questioning the competence of proponents ====
Critics of the Christ myth theory question the competence of its supporters. Maurice Casey has criticized mythicists, pointing out their complete ignorance of how modern critical scholarship actually works. He also criticizes their frequent assumption that modern New Testament scholarship is Christian fundamentalism, insisting that this assumption is not only totally inaccurate, but also exemplary of the mythicists' misconceptions about the ideas and attitudes of mainstream scholars.

According to Bart Ehrman:

Few of these mythicists are actually scholars trained in ancient history, religion, biblical studies or any cognate field, let alone in the ancient languages generally thought to matter for those who want to say something with any degree of authority about a Jewish teacher who (allegedly) lived in first-century Palestine. ... These views are so extreme and so unconvincing to 99.99% of the real experts that anyone holding them is as likely to get a teaching job in an established department of religion as a six-day creationist is likely to land on in a bona fide department of biology

==== Bias ====
According to Van Voorst, mythicism has a long history of being pushed by individuals with anti-religious sentiment from radical Deists, to Freethought advocates, to radical secular humanists and activist atheists. Contemporary mythicists are usually atheists or agnostics. According to Ehrman "It is no accident that virtually all mythicists (in fact, all of them, to my knowledge) are either atheists or agnostics. The ones I know anything about are quite virulently, even militantly, atheist." According to Casey, mythicists are former fundamentalists who push for an atheist agenda and tend to be related to atheist activism. Gullota notes that mythicists are "apologists for a kind of dogmatic atheism" and that usually the proponents are atheist activists who have disdain for religion.

==== Other criticisms ====
Robert Van Voorst has written, "Contemporary New Testament scholars have typically viewed [Christ myth] arguments as so weak or bizarre that they relegate them to footnotes, or often ignore them completely. ... The theory of Jesus' nonexistence is now effectively dead as a scholarly question." Paul L. Maier, former professor of Ancient History at Western Michigan University and current professor emeritus of its Department of History has stated, "Anyone who uses the argument that Jesus never existed is simply flaunting his ignorance."

In 2000, Van Voorst gave an overview of proponents of the "Nonexistence Hypothesis" and their arguments, presenting seven arguments against the hypothesis as put forward by "Wells and his predecessors":

1. "Arguments from silence" are to be rejected, because "it is wrong to suppose that what is unmentioned or undetailed did not exist". Van Voorst further argued that the early Christian literature was not written for historical purposes.
2. Dating the "invention" of Jesus around 100 AD is too late: the Gospel of Mark is generally considered to have been written around 70 AD.
3. The "development [of the Gospel traditions] does not necessarily mean wholesale invention, and difficulties do not prove nonexistence".
4. Wells could not explain why "no pagans and Jews who opposed Christianity denied Jesus' historicity or even questioned it"
5. The rejection of Tacitus (Annals) and Josephus (Antiquities of the Jews) ignores the scholarly consensus.
6. Proponents of the "nonhistoricity hypothesis" are not driven by scholarly interests, but by anti-Christian sentiments.
7. Wells and others do not offer "other, credible hypotheses" for the origins of Christianity.

In 2003, Van Voorst added an eighth "final argument"—that Wells had since accepted the "historical basis for the existence of Jesus".

In his book Did Jesus Exist?, Bart Ehrman surveys the arguments "mythicists" have made against the existence of Jesus since the idea was first raised at the end of the 18th century. Regarding the lack of contemporaneous records for Jesus, Ehrman notes that no comparable Jewish figure is mentioned in contemporary records either and there are mentions of Christ in several Roman works of history from only decades after the death of Jesus. He adds that the authentic letters of the apostle Paul in the New Testament were likely written within a few years of Jesus' death and that Paul likely personally knew James, the brother of Jesus. Ehrman writes that although "our best sources about Jesus, the early Gospels, are riddled with problems ... written decades after Jesus' life by biased authors", they "can be used to yield historically reliable information". He adds, "With respect to Jesus, we have numerous, independent accounts of his life in the sources lying behind the Gospels (and the writings of Paul)", which he says is "pretty astounding for an ancient figure of any kind". Ehrman dismisses the idea that the story of Jesus is an invention based on pagan myths of dying-and-rising gods, maintaining that the early Christians were primarily influenced by Jewish ideas, not Greek or Roman ones, and repeatedly insisting that the idea that there was never such a person as Jesus is not seriously considered at all by historians or experts in the field.

Alexander Lucie-Smith, Catholic priest and doctor of moral theology, states that "People who think Jesus didn't exist are seriously confused," but also notes that "the Church needs to reflect on its failure. If 40 per cent believe in the Jesus myth, this is a sign that the Church has failed to communicate with the general public."

Stanley E. Porter, president and dean of McMaster Divinity College in Hamilton, and Stephen J. Bedard, a Baptist minister and graduate of McMaster Divinity, respond to Harpur's ideas from an evangelical standpoint in Unmasking the Pagan Christ: An Evangelical Response to the Cosmic Christ Idea, challenging the key ideas lying at the foundation of Harpur's thesis. Porter and Bedard conclude that there is sufficient evidence for the historicity of Jesus and assert that Harpur is motivated to promote "universalistic spirituality". (Note: See also Stephen J. Bedard, Jesus Myth Theory, for an overview of blogs by Bedard on the Jesus Myth Theory.)

=== Popular reception ===
In a 2015 poll conducted by the Church of England, 22% of British respondents indicated that they did not believe Jesus was a real person. A 2020 poll by Yougov stated that the number of British respondents who did not believe Jesus existed is just 15%.

Ehrman notes that "the mythicists have become loud, and thanks to the Internet they've attracted more attention". Within a few years of the inception of the World Wide Web (c. 1990), mythicists such as Earl Doherty began to present their argument to a larger public via the internet. (Note: Doherty 1997b, pp. 12–13. Earl Doherty has published a much-expanded version of this review at the following Web site, where he has also reproduced his series "The Jesus Puzzle", which appeared in recent issues of Humanist in Canada: http://www.magi.com/~oblio/jesus.html.) Doherty created the website The Jesus Puzzle in 1996, while the organization Internet Infidels has featured the works of mythicists on their website and mythicism has been mentioned on several popular news sites.

According to Derek Murphy, the documentaries The God Who Wasn't There (2005) and Zeitgeist (2007) introduced the Christ myth theory to a larger audience and gave the topic broad coverage on the Internet. Daniel Gullotta notes the relationship between the organization "Atheists United" and Carrier's work related to mythicism, which has increased "the attention of the public". (Note: Gullotta 2015: "What is also significant about [Richard] Carrier's body of work related to Mythicism is that it represents the result of a $20,000 research grant from various supporters and donations overseen by Atheists United, which demonstrates the public's interest in the subject matter. ... [T]he academic community committed to the study of the New Testament and Christian origins needs to pay attention to Carrier and engage with his thesis (even if they end up rejecting his conclusions); and if for no other reason than that he has the attention of the public.") Maurice Casey and Bart Ehrman credited the continued interest into the view to the hatred of atheist activism for organized religion (especially Christianity) and the increased number of online and independent publishing platforms.

== Documentaries ==
Several 21st-century English-language documentary films have addressed the Christ myth theory, at least in part:

- The God Who Wasn't There (2005), directed by Brian Flemming and featuring Richard Carrier and Robert M. Price
- The Pagan Christ (2007), produced by the Canadian Broadcasting Corporation and featuring Tom Harpur
- Zeitgeist: The Movie (2007), directed by Peter Joseph
- The Hidden Story of Jesus (2007), produced by Channel 4 and featuring Robert Beckford
- Religulous (2008), directed by Larry Charles and featuring Bill Maher
- Caesar's Messiah: The Roman Conspiracy to Invent Jesus (2012), based on the 2005 book of the same name by Joseph Atwill
- Creating Christ (2022), based on the 2018 book Creating Christ: How Roman Emperors Invented Christianity by James Valliant and Warren Fahy

== See also ==
- Bible conspiracy theory
- Christian mythology
- Criticism of the Bible
- Criticism of Christianity
- Criticism of Jesus
- Euhemerism
- Francesco Carotta
- Historical background of the New Testament
- Historical reliability of the Gospels
- Historicity of the Bible
- Jesus in comparative mythology
- List of Christ myth theory proponents
- List of messiah claimants
- Rank-Raglan mythotype
