= Thomas L. Brodie =

Former Irish priest and Christ myth theory proponent

The Reverend Thomas L. Brodie OP
- Born: November 1940; Crusheen, County Clare, Ireland
- Died: 8 February 2026 (aged 85); Galway, County Galway, Ireland
- Education: Pontifical University of St. Thomas Aquinas
- Occupations: Priest and author

Thomas Louis Brodie, OP (November 1940–8 February 2026) was an Irish Dominican priest who was born in Crusheen, County Clare. He worked in academia and has published studies arguing that the New Testament narratives are literary compositions dependent on earlier texts. His 2012 memoir advances the claim that Jesus did not exist as a historical individual. In prior work he proposed a Proto-Luke hypothesis and argued that an early Luke Acts composition precedes Mark in the formation of the Gospels.

== Career ==
Brodie earned his Doctor of Sacred Theology degree at the Pontifical University of St. Thomas Aquinas in Rome in 1988 at the age of 48. He taught Hebrew Bible and New Testament in institutions in the United States and in South Africa, including the Aquinas Institute of Theology in St. Louis, Missouri.

Brodie has written on the Gospel of John, Genesis and on the narratives of Elijah and Elisha as literary models for Gospel composition.

=== Beyond the Quest for the Historical Jesus ===
Beyond the Quest for the Historical Jesus: Memoir of a Discovery is a hybrid of intellectual autobiography and argument about literary dependence in biblical texts. The book concludes that Jesus did not exist as a historical individual and that the New Testament writings are best explained as literary compositions that transform prior texts, especially the Septuagint.

Part or section	Ch.	Title
Part I: The First Revolution, historical investigation	1	The First Revolution, initial contact
	2	Trinidad, the First Revolution deepens
	3	'When a child have no food...'
	4	Still remembering Africa
Part II: The Second Revolution, literary sources	5	Out of the blue, the New Testament shows more clearly its dependence on the Old
	6	The Second Revolution deepens, Berkeley and New Haven 1981 to 1984
	7	The Second Revolution illustrated, the transformation of Elijah's three part call (1 Kings 19) into Jesus' triple challenge to disciples (Luke 9.57 to 62)
Part III: The Third Revolution, literary art including form and genre	8	The Third Revolution, St Louis 1984 to 1991
	9	The Third Revolution deepens, African Genesis 1992 to 1995
	10	From Homer to 4Q525, Tallaght and Boston 1995 to 2000
	11	Limerick, the Dominican Biblical Institute
Part IV: The Funeral	12	The Funeral, 'oral tradition' and its world
	13	The quest for history, rule one
	14	The shipping forecast, deeps below and a storm ahead
	15	Paul's biography, increasingly difficult, Fordham The Bronx 2008
	16	Paul, the penny finally drops
	17	A Marginal Jew, rethinking the historical Jesus, the work of John P. Meier
Part V: Glimmers of Shadowed Beauty	18	Backgrounds of Christianity, religions empires and Judaism
	19	Christian origins, writing as one key
	20	Is it possible to rediscover the meaning of Christ?
	21	Glimmers of shadowed beauty, symbol of the invisible God
	22	Reasoning with beauty
Epilogue		Bart D. Ehrman's Did Jesus Exist? The Historical Argument for Jesus of Nazareth (March 2012)

==== Synopsis and analysis ====
Brodie organizes his account into three methodological shifts which he calls revolutions, followed by a section titled The Funeral. The first traces his movement into historical investigation. The second sets out claims of pervasive literary dependence of New Testament narratives on earlier texts with emphasis on Elijah Elisha and on the practice of rewriting. The third stresses literary art and genre. The Funeral argues that appeals to oral tradition do not account for Gospel composition and that early Christian texts are literary products that simulate historical reporting. The epilogue engages Bart D. Ehrman by arguing that the evidence points to literary construction rather than historical biography.

Within the same trajectory Brodie's earlier monograph The Birthing of the New Testament articulates a Proto Luke hypothesis, positing an early Luke Acts composition modelled in part on Elijah Elisha which he places prior to Mark. The formulation includes the claim that Mark reworks this early Luke Acts and that Matthew reworks Mark, with John later refining discourse materials.

==== Reception ====
A review by Jeremy Corley in the Irish Theological Quarterly identified what he viewed as weak parallels, noted Brodie's reliance on a Proto Luke theory, and argued that literary dependence claims do not demonstrate the non historicity of Jesus. Corley contrasted the lack of birth narratives and passion in Elijah Elisha with the extensive Jesus traditions and he criticized Brodie's linkage of 1 Corinthians 15.3 to 7 with Numbers 11 to 17 as unconvincing. David Litwa surveyed Brodie's method and concluded that moving from elaborate literary parallel lists to historical dependence is not warranted, adding that identifying literary shaping does not by itself negate historicity.

=== Christ mythicism and sanctions ===
Brodie's book publicly advanced his view that Jesus did not exist as a historical individual. In January 2013 Irish media reported that he had stepped down from his role in Limerick and that an internal review was underway. One local report stated he had already finished his term as director and that the book was under review by a committee of scholars. The Irish Catholic press also reported on the possible disciplinary process. An official Dominican response was published in Doctrine and Life in May and June 2014. It states that: "[Prior Provincial of Ireland] set up a committee of five experts from within the Province to examine the work under dispute. […] [T]he committee advised that they judged Beyond the Quest to be ‘imprudent and dangerous’ (a phrase from the Order’s own legislation). Accepting this assessment, the Provincial continued the sanctions on Tom Brodie — that he withdraw fully from ministry and from all forms of teaching, writing, or making public statements."

=== Death ===
Brodie, who was born in November 1940, died on February 8, 2026, aged 85.

== Bibliography ==
- The Quest for the Origin of John's Gospel, A Source Oriented Approach. Oxford University Press 1993. ISBN 0195075889
- The Gospel According to John, A Literary and Theological Commentary. Oxford University Press 1997. ISBN 0195118111
- The Crucial Bridge, The Elijah Elisha Narrative. Michael Glazier 2000. ISBN 081465942X
- Genesis as Dialogue, A Literary Historical and Theological Commentary. Oxford University Press 2001. ISBN 0195138368
- The Birthing of the New Testament, The Intertextual Development of the New Testament Writings. Sheffield Phoenix Press 2006. ISBN 1905048661
- Beyond the Quest for the Historical Jesus, Memoir of a Discovery. Sheffield Phoenix Press 2012. ISBN 190753458X

== See also ==
- Dominicans in Ireland
