= Alvar Ellegård =

Swedish linguist (1919–2008)

- Born: November 12, 1919; Gothenburg, Sweden
- Died: February 8, 2008 (aged 88); Gothenburg, Sweden
- Occupation: Professor of English
- Employer: University of Gothenburg
- Known for: Darwin's legacy, relationship between religion and science, Jesus myth theory

Alvar Ellegård (November 12, 1919 – February 8, 2008) was a Swedish linguist and scholar. He was professor of English at the University of Gothenburg, and a member of the academic board of the Swedish National Encyclopedia.

He is the author of a number of books and papers on English language and linguistics, including A Statistical Method for Determining Authorship (1962). He also became known outside the field for his work on the conflict between religious dogma and science, and for his promotion of the Jesus myth theory, the idea that Jesus did not exist as an historical figure. His books about religion and science include Darwin and the General Reader (1958), The Myth of Jesus (1992), and Jesus: One Hundred Years Before Christ. A Study in Creative Mythology (1999).

== Career ==
In his 1953 thesis, Ellegård showed how the use of periphrastic do progressed through different syntactic environments during Early Modern English.

In 1953 Ellegård published his PhD thesis, which dealt with the development of the use of the auxiliary do in the grammar of late Middle English and Early Modern English. This thesis has remained an influential and frequently cited work central to the study of this aspect of the historical syntax of English. He was appointed associate professor of English in the same year. He was a professor of the English language at University of Gothenburg between 1962 and 1984. His book Darwin and the General Reader (1958) is a detailed study of the changes in British public opinion which took place following the 1859 publication of The Origin of Species. It is based on an analysis of the periodical press of the period.

In 1977, he was elected member of the Royal Swedish Academy of Letters, History and Antiquities.

=== Writings on Christianity ===
After retirement Ellegård started a new line of research into the historicity of Jesus and the idea that Jesus is a myth. In his book Myten om Jesus (The Myth of Jesus) (1992), he presents new theories about the Dead Sea Scrolls and their association with the early history of Christianity. Ellegård argues that the Jesus of the gospels is a mythical figure and that the gospels are largely fiction. He identifies the figure Paul of Tarsus who had a vision as corresponding to the Essene Teacher of Righteousness, the leader of the Essenes at Qumran about 150 years before the gospels, and writes that it was Paul who created Christianity through his contacts with the sect that kept the Dead Sea Scrolls.

According to Ellegård, the Damascus Document gives support to this theory. The document states that the Essenes moved to Damascus outside Jerusalem, but the word "Damascus" appears to be being used symbolically to refer to exile. Ellegård interprets this as evidence that the "Damascus" that is mentioned in the Acts of the Apostles in fact is Qumran. Paul was on his way to Damascus when he had a vision of Jesus.

== Selected publications ==
- The Auxiliary Do: The Establishment and Regulation of its Use in English (Ph.D. thesis, 1953)
- Darwin and the General Reader (1958)
- A Statistical Method for Determining Authorship (1962)
- The Syntactic Structure of English Texts (1978)
- «Who were the Eruli?» Scandia 53, 1987
- Myten om Jesus: den tidigaste kristendomen i nytt ljus, Bonniers (Stockholm 1992). ISBN 91-34-51245-4 (in Swedish)
- Jesus – One Hundred Years Before Christ: A Study In Creative Mythology, (London 1999). ISBN 0-87951-720-4
