= Iosif Kryvelev =

Soviet scholar of religion (1906-1991)

Iosif Aronovich Kryvelev (Russian: Иосиф Аронович Крывелёв, 1906–1991) was a Soviet scholar of religion and historian of Judaism and Christianity. From 1959 until his death, Kryvelev was affiliated with the Ethnography Institute of the Soviet Academy of Sciences (now Institute of Anthropology and Ethnography). By the end of the 1980s Kryvelev remained as virtually the only proponent of Christ myth theory in Soviet academia.

== Life ==
Kryvelev was born in Moscow and graduated from the Moscow Institute of History and Philosophy in 1934. From 1932 he taught philosophy. Kryvelev was affiliated with Soviet atheism propaganda, having worked in the Central Museum of Irreligion in 1936–39. During World War II he fought in the military. In 1947–49, Kryvelev worked in the Philosophy Institute of the Soviet Academy of Sciences. He attained the degrees of Doctor of Philosophy and Professor. In the academic career, Kryvelev declared his adherence to the Marxist–Leninist worldview, being convinced that "the objective elucidation of historico-religious problems leads to the revealing of those aspects of religion which characterise it as the opium of the people, as a reactionary ideology acting against the interests of mankind". Along with Soviet Armenian philosopher Suren Kaltakhchyan, Kryvelev published antireligious articles in Komsomolskaya Pravda. In July 1986, Kryvelev criticised Chinghiz Aitmatov's novel The Place of the Skull, believing that to reject principled, logical atheism was to reject the "very foundations of a scientific and materialist worldview". Kryvelev's critical article spurred a reply from Soviet poet Yevgeni Yevtushenko in December 1986. Yevtushenko argued that Kryvelev had made a mistake by confusing the opinions of the novel's hero with those of Aitmatov himself. Kryvelev died in Moscow in 1991.

== Selected publications ==
- Christ – Myth or Reality? (Religious studies in the USSR, 1987)
