= Abram Ranovich =

Soviet historian of antiquity (1885–1948)

Abram Borisovich Ranovich (real surname Rabinovich, Russian: Абрам Борисович Ранович, 15 December [O.S. 3 December] 1885 – 29 May 1948) was a Soviet scholar of classical antiquity and religion. Ranovich authored several publications on the history of Judaism and early Christianity. He was awarded the Order of the Badge of Honour.

Born in Zhytomyr, Ranovich received his doctoral degree in 1937. In 1937–41, he was the Professor of the Moscow State University. Ranovich's works Sources for the Study of the Social Roots of Christianity and Primary Sources for the History of Early Christianity, both published in 1933, as well as The Ancient Criticism of Christianity: Fragments from Lucian, Celsus, Porphiry and Others (1935) provided Soviet historians of Christianity with the materials to go further. Ranovich also translated Frontinus' Stratagems into Russian. His final work, On Early Christianity (published posthumously in 1959) was a major Soviet study of this topic. According to Ranovich, three factors contributed to the success of Christianity: the teaching about the incarnation of the Godhead in man, the social richness of Christian eschatology and the international nature of its preaching. At the same time Ranovich supported the Christ myth theory compatible with materialistic Marxist–Leninist approach of his times; in particular, he wrote: "It can be considered scientifically well established that Jesus Christ is a mythical creature. He was not the founder of the religion whose ignorant and gullible followers elevated him to the rank of God and endowed him with superhuman traits, as liberal theologians want to portray. On the contrary, Jesus is a deity, who was later endowed with human traits, with earthly 'biography'". Ranovich died in Moscow at the age of 62.
