= List of Christ myth theory proponents =

This is a partial list of people who have been categorized as Christ myth theory proponents, the belief that "the historical Jesus did not exist. Or if he did, he had virtually nothing to do with the founding of Christianity".

== A ==
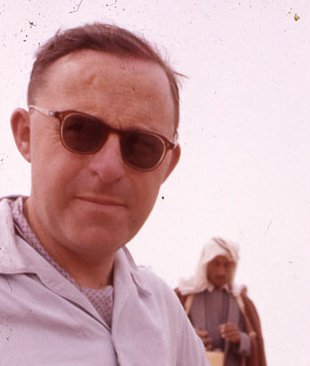
John Marco Allegro

- John M. Allegro (1923–1988) – English archaeologist.

== B ==
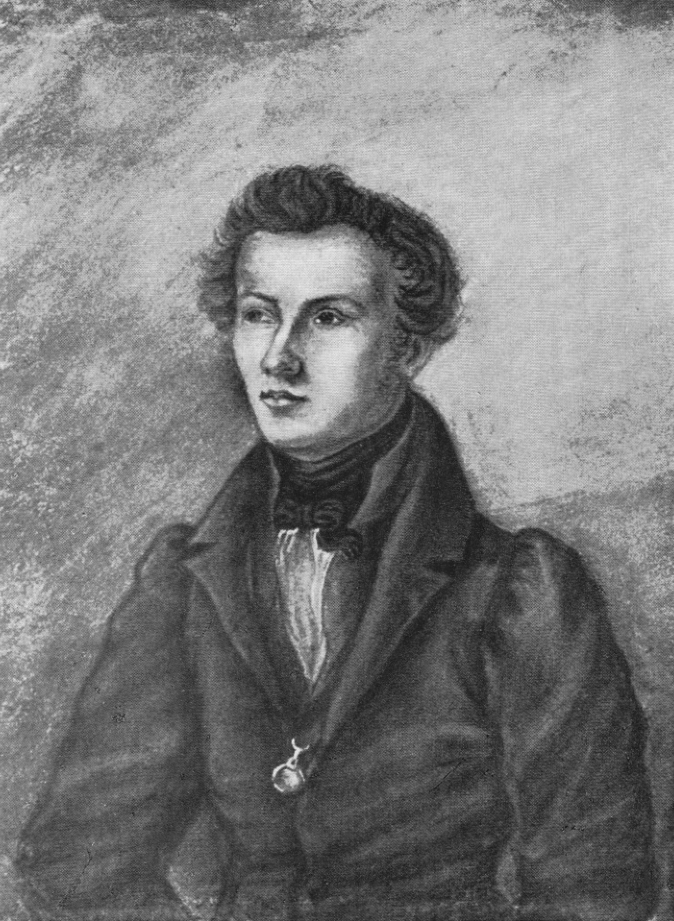
Bruno Bauer

- Dan Barker (born 1949) – American atheist activist.
- Bruno Bauer (1809–1882) – German philosopher and historian.
- Albert Bayet (1880–1961) – French sociologist.
- Gustaaf Adolf van den Bergh van Eysinga (1874–1957) – Dutch theologian.
- Gerard Bolland (1854–1922) – Dutch philosopher and scholar.
- Emilio Bossi (1870–1920) – Swiss journalist and lawyer.
- Georg Brandes (1842–1927) – Danish literary critic.
- Thomas L. Brodie (1940–2026) – Irish Roman Catholic priest.

== C ==
- Richard Carlile (1790–1843) – English journalist, radical and secularist.
- Edward Carpenter (1844–1929) – English socialist poet, philosopher and anthologist.
- Richard Carrier (born 1969) – American historian, author, and atheist activist.
- Paul-Louis Couchoud (1879–1959) – French philosopher.
- Herbert Cutner (1881–1969) – English artist, etcher and freethought writer.

== D ==
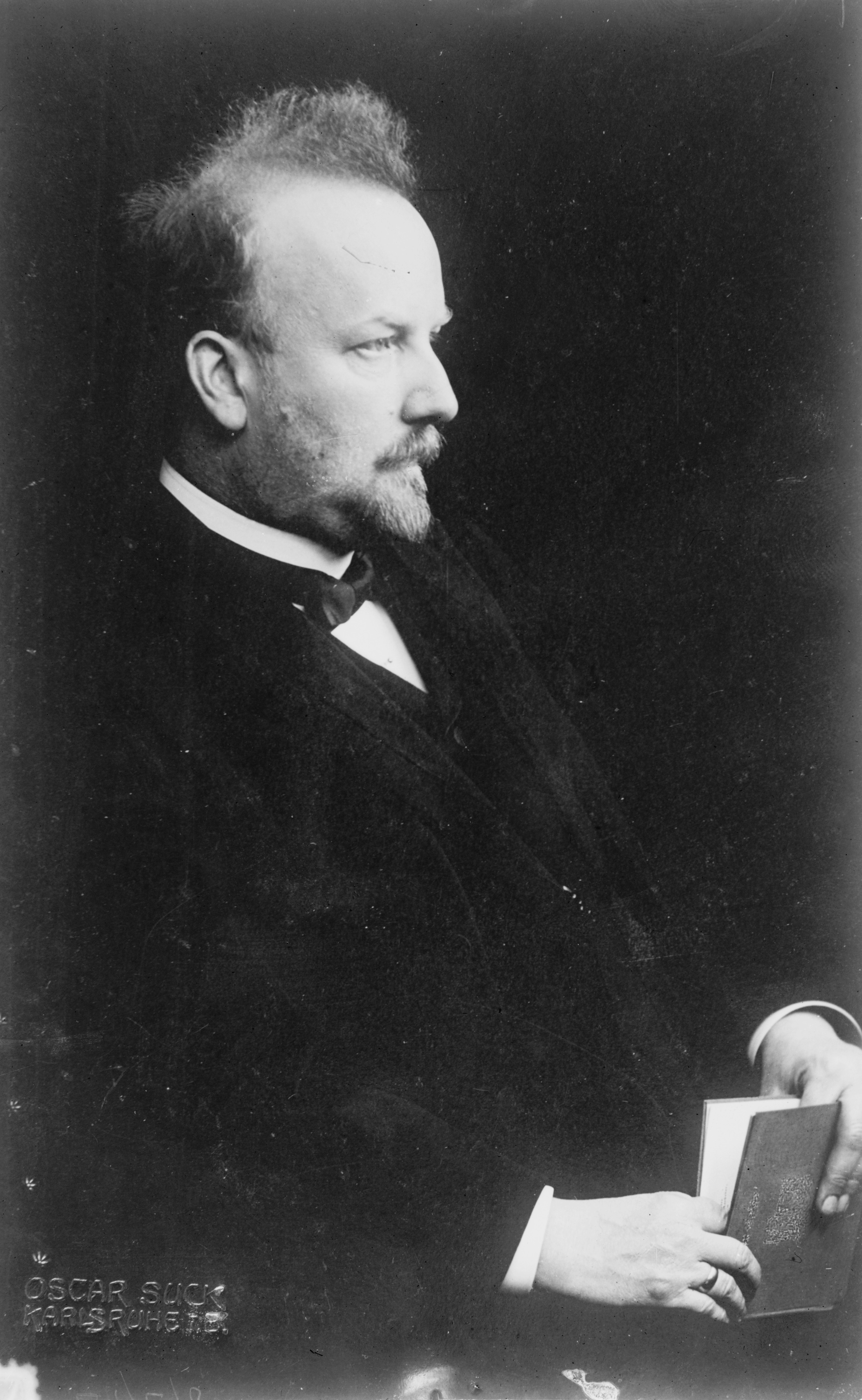
Arthur Drews

- Earl Doherty (born 1941) – Canadian writer.
- Arthur Drews (1865–1935) – German historian and philosopher.
- Édouard Dujardin (1861–1949) – French novelist and writer.
- Charles-François Dupuis (1742–1809) – French scientist.

== E ==
- Alvar Ellegård (1919–2008) – Swedish linguist.

== F ==
- David Fitzgerald (born 1964) – American atheist activist and writer.
- Brian Flemming (born 1966) – American film director.

== G ==
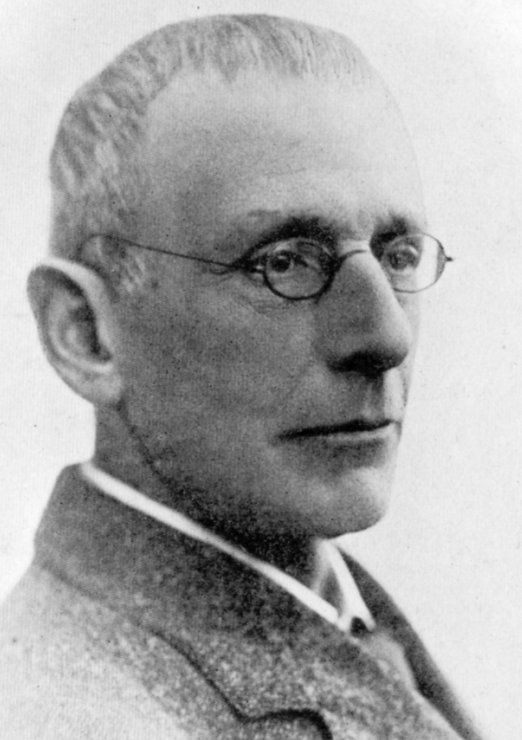
Edward Greenly

- Peter Gandy – British writer.
- Marshall Gauvin (1881–1978) – Canadian atheist and freethought writer.
- Gilbert T. Sadler (1871–1939) – British Congregational minister.
- Kersey Graves (1813–1883) – American freethought writer.
- Edward Greenly (1861–1951) – English geologist.

== H ==
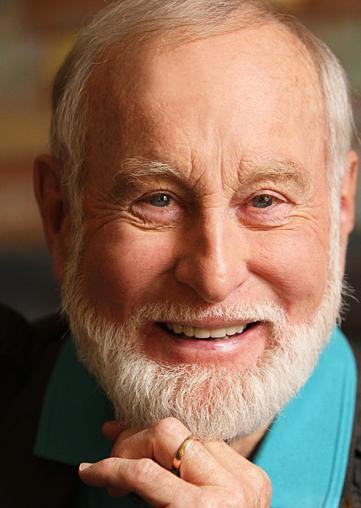
Tom Harpur

- Tom Harpur (1929–2017) – Canadian theologian and writer.
- Arthur Heulhard (1849–1920) – French journalist.

== J ==
- Peter Jensen (1861–1936) – German orientalist.
- Edward Johnson (1842–1901) – English historian.

== K ==
- Albert Kalthoff (1850–1906) – German Protestant theologian.
- Shūsui Kōtoku (1871–1911) – Japanese socialist and anarchist.
- Sergey Kovalev (1886–1960) – Russian scholar of classical antiquity.
- Iosif Kryvelev (1906–1991) – Russian historian of Judaism and Christianity.
- Alvin Boyd Kuhn (1880–1963) – American Theosophist.

== L ==
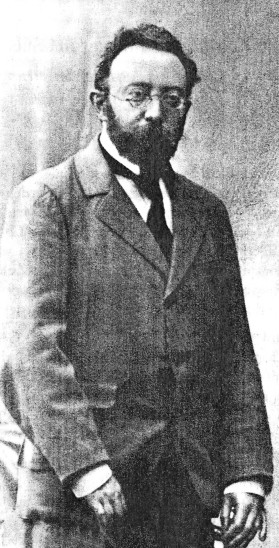
Samuel Lublinski

- Harold Leidner (1916–2008) – American patent attorney.
- Logan Mitchell (1802–1881) – British freethinker.
- Abraham Dirk Loman (1823–1897) – Dutch theologian.
- Samuel Lublinski (1868–1910) – Literary historian, critic, and philosopher of religion.

== M ==
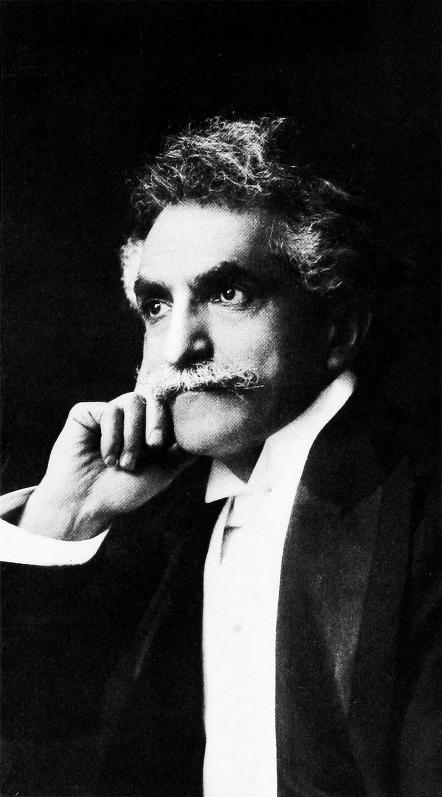
M. M. Mangasarian

- M. M. Mangasarian (1859–1943) – American rationalist and secularist.
- Michael Martin (1932–2015) – American philosopher.
- Gerald Massey (1828–1907) – English poet and spiritualist.
- Dennis McKinsey (1940–2009) – American atheist writer.
- Myles McSweeney (1814–1881) – Irish Chartist, mythologist and secularist writer.

== N ==
- Andrzej Niemojewski (1864–1921) – Polish social and political activist.

== O ==
- Michel Onfray (born 1959) – French philosopher.

== P ==
- Minas Papageorgiou (born 1983) – Greek journalist and author.
- Allard Pierson (1831–1896) – Dutch theologian and historian.
- Robert M. Price (born 1954) – American theologian, New Testament scholar and writer.

== R ==
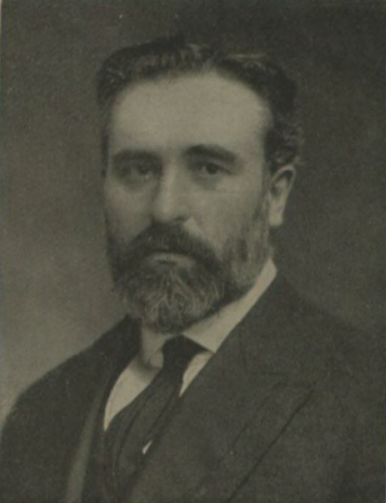
J. M. Robertson

- Abram Ranovich (1885–1948) – Russian scholar of classical antiquity and religion.
- Salomon Reinach (1858–1932) – French archaeologist and historian.
- Samuel Maximilian Rieser (1893–1981) – American lawyer and philosopher.
- Jonathan M. Roberts (1821–1888) – American lawyer and spiritualist medium.
- J. M. Robertson (1856–1933) – Scottish journalist, politician and writer.
- Rudolf Steck (1842–1924) – Swiss reformed theologian.
- Nikolai Rumyantsev (1892–1956) – Russian historian.
- L. Gordon Rylands (1862–1942) – British criminologist and writer.

== S ==
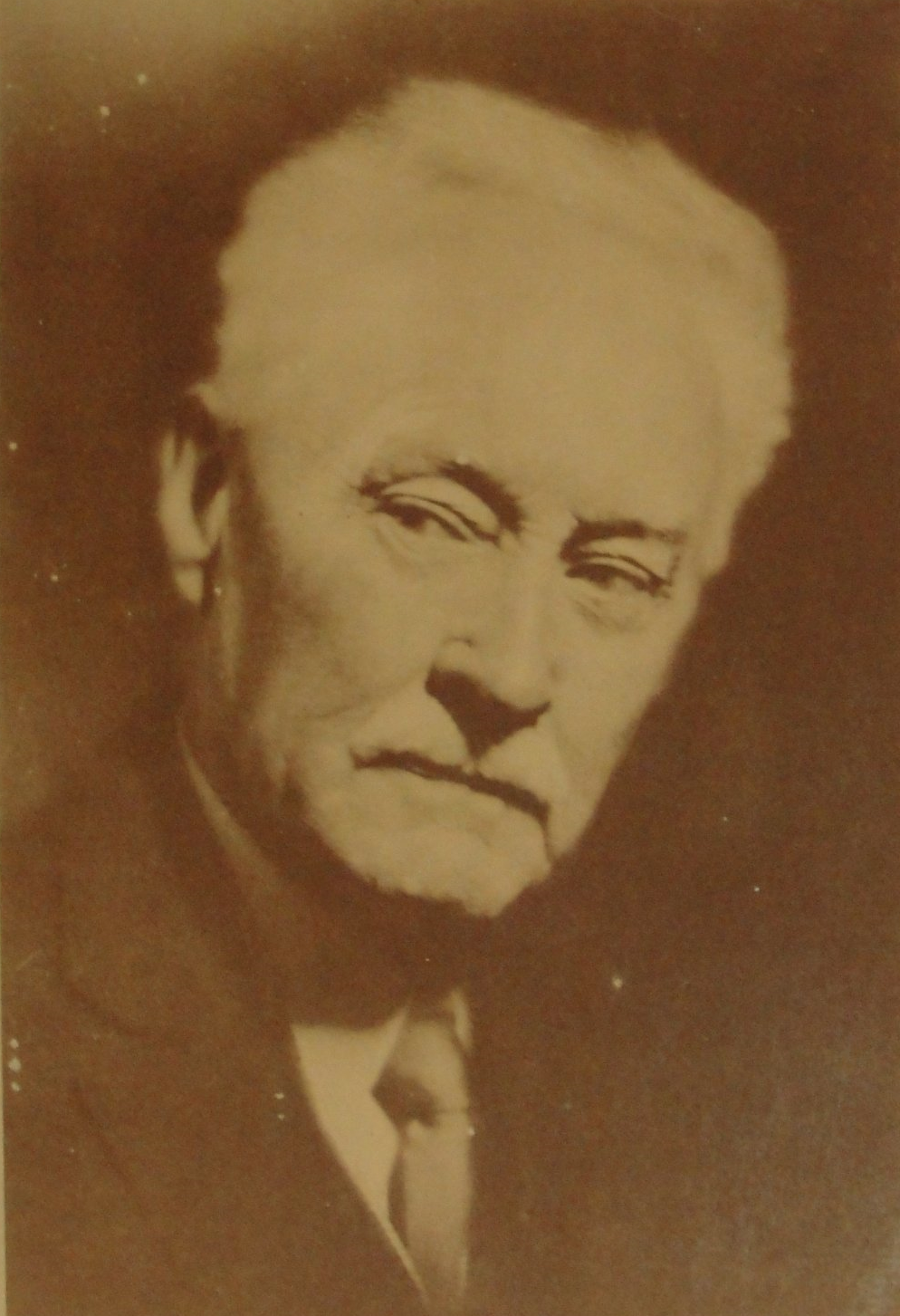
William Benjamin Smith

- Acharya S (1961–2015) – American writer.
- Sarah Elizabeth Titcomb (1841–1895) – American genealogist and writer.
- Homer William Smith (1895–1962) – American physiologist and science writer.
- William Benjamin Smith (1850–1934) – American professor of mathematics.

== T ==
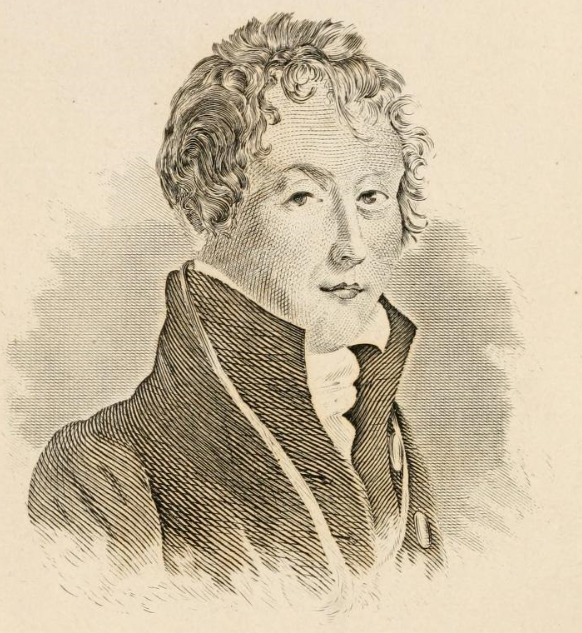
Robert Taylor

- Robert Taylor (1784–1844) – Freethinker and radical.
- Thomas L. Thompson (born 1939) – Danish Biblical scholar and theologian.
- Farrell Till (1933–2012) – American skeptic.

== V ==
- Charles Virolleaud (1879–1968) – French archaeologist.
- Constantin François de Chassebœuf, comte de Volney (1757–1820) – French historian and philosopher.

== W ==
- Barbara G. Walker (born 1930) – American feminist writer.
- George Albert Wells (1926–2017) – English Professor of German and writer.
- Joseph Wheless (1868–1950) – American lawyer.
- Thomas Whittaker (1856–1935) – English metaphysician and critic.
- Robert Wipper (1859–1954) – Russian historian.

== Z ==
- Frank Zindler (born 1939) – American atheist writer.
