= The World's Sixteen Crucified Saviors =

1875 book by Kersey Graves

- Author: Kersey Graves
- Publication date: 1875

The World's Sixteen Crucified Saviors; Or, Christianity Before Christ, Containing New, Startling, and Extraordinary Revelations in Religious History, which Disclose the Oriental Origin of All the Doctrines, Principles, Precepts, and Miracles of the Christian New Testament, and Furnishing a Key for Unlocking Many of Its Sacred Mysteries, Besides Comprising the History of 16 Heathen Crucified Gods is an 1875 non-fiction book written by American freethinker Kersey Graves, which asserts the fringe view that Jesus was not an actual person, but was a creation largely based on earlier stories of deities or god-men saviours who had been crucified and descended to and ascended from the underworld. Parts were reprinted in The Book Your Church Doesn't Want You to Read edited by Tim C. Leedom in 1994, and it was republished in its entirety in 2001.

The book is often used as a source by proponents of the fringe Christ myth theory, such as Dorothy M. Murdock, Tom Harpur, and John G. Jackson. Many of the same theories espoused in the book are repeated in the documentaries The God Who Wasn't There, The Pagan Christ, Zeitgeist: The Movie and Religulous.

American Atheists leader Madalyn Murray O'Hair was a fan of the book. While American philosopher and independent scholar Richard Carrier found the book to be incomplete, he appreciated some of its points.

== Summary ==
Graves, often citing the pseudohistorical Anacalypsis and other works by Godfrey Higgins (1772–1833) as his source, asserts in the book that many messiah-like "saviors" were crucified on a cross or tree before ascending into heaven.

"One thing is clear — the mythos of the Hindus, the mythos of the Jews and the mythos of the Greeks are all at bottom the same; and what are called their early histories are not histories of humankind, but are contrivances under the appearance of histories to perpetuate doctrines." (Higgins, Anacalypsis)

Here is Graves' main list, arranged chronologically:

- Thulis of Egypt, 1700 B.C.
- Krishna of India, 1200 B.C.
- Crite of Chaldea, 1200 B.C.
- Atys of Phrygia, 1170 B.C.
- Thammuz or Tammuz of Syria, 1160 B.C.
- Hesus or Eros 834 B.C.
- Bali of Orissa, 725 B.C.
- Indra of Thibet (Tibet), 725 B.C.
- Iao of Nepaul (Nepal), 622 B.C.
- Buddha Sakia (Muni) of India, 600 B.C.
- Mitra (Mithra) of Persia, 600 B.C.
- Alcestos of Euripides, 600 B.C.
- Quezalcoatl of Mexico, 587 B.C.
- Wittoba of the Bilingonese, 552 B.C.
- Prometheus or Æschylus of Caucasus, 547 B.C.
- Quirinus of Rome, 506 B.C.

He also lists a number of other holy figures who took the form of men and then ascended into heaven, including:

- Salivahana of Bermuda
- Zulis or Zhule of Egypt
- Osiris of Egypt
- Oru of Egypt
- Odin of the Scandinavians
- Zoroaster of Persia
- Baal of Phoenicia
- Taut, "the only Begotten of God" of Phoenicia, inventor of letters
- Bali of Afghanistan
- Xamolxis (Zalmoxis) of Thrace
- "Zoar of the Bonzes"
- Adad of Assyria
- Deva Tat of Siam (Thailand)
- Sammonocadam (Sommona-Codom) of Siam (Thailand)
- Alcides of Thebes
- Mikado of the Sintoos
- Beddru of Japan
- Bremrillah of the Druids
- Thor son of Odin of the Gauls/Norse
- Cadmus of Greece
- Hil/Feta of the Mandaites
- Gentaut of Mexico
- Universal Monarch of the Sibyls
- Ischy of Formosa (Taiwan)
- Divine Teacher of Plato
- Holy One of Xaca
- (Fohi) of China
- Tien of China
- Adonis son of the virgin Io of Greece
- Ixion of Rome
- Mohamud or Mahomet of Arabia

The book claims that a number of these deities or god-men shared at least some traits of Jesus as described in the New Testament, drawing the strongest similarities with Krishna. For example, some figures had miraculous or virgin births, were sons of supreme gods, were born on December 25, had stars point to their birthplaces, were visited by shepherds and magi as infants, fled from death as children, exhibited traits of divinity in childhood, spent time in the desert, traveled as they taught, had disciples, performed miracles, were persecuted, were crucified, descended into hell after death, appeared as resurrections or apparitions, or ascended into heaven. Graves also devotes chapters to the pagan roots of baptism and the eucharist, and concludes that Jesus was not a real person.

== Quotes ==
Here I desire to impress upon the minds of my clerical brethren the important fact, that the gospel histories of Christ were written by men who had formerly been Jews (see Acts xxi. 20), and probably possessing the strong proclivity to imitate and borrow which their bible shows was characteristic of that nation ; and being written many years after Christ's death, according to that standard Christian author, Dr. Lardner, it was impossible, under such circumstances, for them to separate (if they had desired to) the real facts and events of his life from the innumerable fictions and fables then afloat everywhere relative to the heathen Gods who had pre-enacted a similar history. Two reasons are thus furnished for their constructing a history of Christ almost identical with that of other Gods, as shown in chapters XXX., XXXI. and XXXII. of this work.

== Criticism ==
American historian Richard Carrier, a supporter of the Christ myth theory, has written online about his concerns with The World's Sixteen Crucified Saviors. For example, Carrier argues that Graves often omits citations, uses dubious sources, mixes opinions with facts, and draws conclusions beyond the evidence presented. However, according to Carrier, there is no comprehensive rebuttal of the book, and although many of his facts are wrong, other assertions such as a December 25 birthdate among Greco-Roman sun gods are now acknowledged to be correct. Carrier argues there is a better case for the resurrection of Thracian god Zalmoxis (also called Salmoxis or Gebele'izis) and the crucifixion and resurrection of Sumerian goddess Inanna (also known as Ishtar, but with no sources claiming her alleged crucifixion), neither of whom are mentioned by Graves.

== See also ==
- Historicity of Jesus
- Jesus in comparative mythology
