= Anacalypsis =

Treatise by religious historian Godfrey Higgins

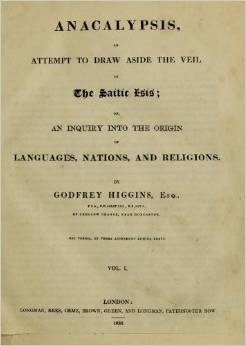
- The original edition of Anacalypsis by Godfrey Higgins
- Author: Godfrey Higgins
- Original title: Anacalypsis: An Attempt to Draw Aside the Veil of the Saitic Isis or an Inquiry into the Origin of Languages, Nations and Religions
- Language: English
- Genre: History

Anacalypsis (full title: Anacalypsis: An Attempt to Draw Aside the Veil of the Saitic Isis or an Inquiry into the Origin of Languages, Nations and Religions) is a lengthy two-volume treatise written by religious historian Godfrey Higgins, and published after his death in 1836. The book was published in two quarto volumes numbering 1,436 pages, and contains meticulous references to hundreds of references. Initially printed as a limited edition of 200 copies, it was partially reprinted in 1878, and completely reprinted in a limited edition of 350 copies in 1927. In 1965, University Books, Inc. published 500 sets for the United States and 500 sets for the British Commonwealth with Publisher's Note and a Postface.

== Meaning of the word "Anacalypsis" ==
According to the Spanish philosopher Antonio López, the word that names the title could be problematic because there isn't an explanation regarding the word itself. This is a problem that the reader may find in Higgins' book because the title is unexplained. In the original London edition of 1836, the word Anacalypsis appears only twice: once in the title, and once in a footnote on page 447, in which Higgins expresses his plan for a sequel titled Commentaries on the Anacalypsis and on Ancient History.

The word anacalypsis comes from the Greek ανακάλυψις, which can be translated as «discovery» or «find». Anacalypsis is the antonym of "apocalypsis." Again according the philosopher Antonio López, in the Higgins' book the meaning of the word is twofold:

- On the one hand, the idea of anacalypsis is seen as something that is evident, transparent and clear, while the apocalyptic is mysterious, dark, and enigmatic.
- On the other hand, apocalypse means revelation or unveiling and refers to the last canonical book of the New Testament, Revelation, which states that the world is heading for an imminent and tragic end.

Regarding to the second meaning, it is relevant to understand that in the Higgins' work, anacalypsis does not refer to a teleological principle, but a regression towards the beginning that allows us to see through light how myths were created, precisely like the apocalypse in many religions. In fact, the title of the work speaks precisely about this unveiling from the Egyptian goddess Isis. The idea of anacalypsis as "unveiling" was discussed in depth by the Russian writer and theosophist Helena Blavatsky in her book Isis Unveiled.

== Content ==
The work is the product of more than twenty years of research during which Higgins tried to uncover "a most ancient and universal religion from which all later creeds and doctrines sprang." It includes several maps and lithographic plates of Druidical Monuments. The book itself details many of Higgins' beliefs and observations about the development of religion. Among these was his theory that a secret religious order, which he labeled "Pandeism" (from Pans- or Pandu- referring to a family of Gods, appending with -ism), had continued from ancient times to the present day, stretching at least from Greece to India, and possibly having once covered the entire world.

Among the many theories presented in this book is that both the Celtic Druids and the Jews originated in India – and that the name of the Biblical Abraham is really a variation of the word Brahma, created by shifting the last letter to the beginning: Abrahma. Higgins used the term "Pandeism" to describe the religious society that he purported had existed from ancient times, and at one time had been known throughout the entire world. Higgins believed this practice continued in secret until the time of his writing, in the 1830s in an area stretching from Greece to India.

I think Pandeism was a system; and that when I say the country or kingdom of Pandæa, I express myself in a manner similar to what I should do, if I said the Popish kingdom, or the kingdoms of Popery: or, again, the Greeks have many idle ceremonies in their church, meaning the Greeks of all nations: or, the countries of the Pope are superstitious, &c. At the same time, I beg to be understood as not denying that there was such a kingdom as that of Pandæa, the daughter of Cristna, any more than I would deny that there was a kingdom of France ruled by the eldest son of the church, or the eldest son of the Pope.

His usage appears related to pantheism, but is distinctly different. While pantheism normally refers to one universal god, the Pandeism described by Higgins, refers to the worship of a family, a union, or a pantheon of gods which are collectively universal.

Higgins was a follower of John Toland; although Toland had lived in an era when "deism" and "theism" were interchangeable, Higgins wrote during the 1820s and 1830s, a period several generations later when deism was popular and became distinct from theism. When coining "Pandeism", Higgins showed his awareness of the similarity between Pandeism and pantheism by directly contrasting his Pandeism with Toland's pantheism:

Many persons have thought that this Pan related to what has been called Pantheism, or the adoration of universal nature, and that Pantheism was the first system of man. For this opinion I cannot see a shadow of foundation. As I have formerly said, it seems to me contrary to common sense to believe, that the ignorant half-savage would first worship the ground he treads upon,— that he would raise his mind to so abstruse and so improbable a doctrine as, that the earth he treads upon created him and created itself: for Pantheism instantly comes to this.

Higgins was also aware of the similarity between his Pandeism and deism, and demonstrated familiarity with deism, as he mentions deism or deists at several other points in the same work. Higgins noted for example that "the Rev. R. Taylor, A.M., the Deist, now in jail, persecuted by the Whigs for his religious opinions, in his learned defense of Deism called the Diegesis, has clearly proved all the hierarchical institutions of the Christians to be a close copy of those of the Essenians of Egypt."

While more contemporary pandeism evokes both pantheism and deism and suggests their combination, Higgins' usage is removed from both. Whereas Toland's construction of pantheism was based on the Greek root words pan, meaning all and Theos, meaning God, Higgins flips the construction around, stating:

When I consider all the circumstances detailed above respecting the Pans, I cannot help believing that, under a mythos, a doctrine or history of a sect is concealed. Cunti, the wife of Pandu (du or God, Pan), wife of the generative power, mother of the Pandavas or devas, daughter of Sura or Syra the Sun — Pandæa only daughter of Cristna or the Sun — Pandion, who had by Medea a son called Medus, the king of the Medes, who had a cousin, the famous Perseus — surely all this is very mythological — an historical parable!

...

We have seen that though Cristna was said to have left many sons, he left his immense empire, which extended from the sources of the Indus to Cape Comorin, (for we find a Regio Pandionis near this point,) to his daughter Pandæa; but, from finding the icon of Buddha so constantly shaded with the nine Cobras, &c., I am induced to think that this Pandeism was a doctrine, which had been received both by Buddhists and Brahmins.

In contrast to Toland, Higgins uses the word "Pans" or "Pande" to collect variations of named gods or godlike heroes – such as Pandu, Pandæa, the Pandavas, and Pandion – into a single system of worship called "Pandeism" as a sort of family name for a group of godlike individuals. Thus where Toland's term referred to pan- (all) and -theism (god), Higgins refers to Pande- (a root indicating this family of gods) and -ism, a wholly English construction indicating allegiance to an ideology. The term related by Higgins refers to a secret sect of worshipers of these "Pans", which was left in the wake of the collapse of an ancient empire that stretched from Greece (the home of Medea and Perseus) to India (where the Buddhists and the Brahmins coexist). Higgins concludes that his observations:

...confirm the very close connexion which there must have been in some former time, between Siam, Afghanistan, Western Syria, and Ireland. Indeed I cannot doubt that there has been really one grand empire, or one Universal, one Pandæan, or one Catholic religion, with one language, which has extended over the whole of the old world; uniting or governing at the same time Columbo in the island of Serendive, and Columbo in the West of Scotland...

While worthy of note, the above discussion is an example of what Higgins tries to present in his work: that religious scripture is written in a manner to confuse rather than clarify. The exhaustive discussion above comparing "Pandeism" and "Pantheism", while valid, fails to disclose the main emphasis of his effort, which is to show that all religions are the same and from a lost, antediluvian, original source in which all characters are allegoric representations of the zodiac with the primary deity being the sun. His theory is that this lost doctrine has been corrupted, by ignorance of allegory or by intentional purposes, from ancient times up and through Higgins' own time.

== Death and later influence ==
Higgins died before he was able to complete the final chapter on Christianity. Higgins leaves clues, however, that there may be additional layers of meaning in his work, stating in the preface to Vol. I of 'Anacalypsis':

I think it right to warn my reader, that there are more passages than one in the book, which are of that nature, which will be perfectly understood by my Masonic friends, but which my engagements prevent me explaining to the world at large.

Decades later, John Ballou Newbrough cited extensively to the Anacalypsis, including Higgins' use of Pandeism, in the notes to Newbrough's 1882 Oahspe Bible. Similar, possibly related coinings of Pandeism have occurred elsewhere. One author writes of a contemporary religious group in Bali (which is within the geographic realm of Pandeism described by Higgins):

The empu uses a typical pedanda ketu, "crown" which is tall and red, and a ball. Another man leads Pande ceremonies on the island. He represents a curious mix of Buddhism, Hinduism, and, if it can be called this, "Pandeism".

== Later references ==
Kersey Graves, author of the 1875 book The World's 16 Crucified Saviours, derived "many of the most important facts collated in [his] work" from the Anacalypsis.

Vsevolod Solovyov, author of the 1895 book, A Modern Priestess of Isis, alleged that Madame Blavatsky plagiarized extensively from Higgins (among others) in her 1877 book Isis Unveiled. The same investigator also found plagiarism in The Secret Doctrine (1888), also by Blavatsky.

Twentieth century author Alvin Boyd Kuhn and contemporary author Tom Harpur, both proponents of the Christ myth theory, reference Higgins in their writings, particularly in Harpur's 2004 best-seller, The Pagan Christ.
