= Titcomb =

Titcomb is a surname. Notable people with the surname include:

- Brent Titcomb (born 1940), Canadian actor and musician
- Everett Titcomb (1884–1968), American organist, choir-director, and composer
- Gord Titcomb (born 1953), Canadian ice hockey player
- Gordon Titcomb, American musician and composer
- Jonathan Titcomb (1819–1887), English clergyman
- La Belle Titcomb (born 1876), American vaudeville performer
- Ledell Titcomb (1866–1950), American Major League Baseball player
- Lesley Titcomb (born 1961), British civil servant
- Liam Titcomb (born 1987), Canadian musician and actor
- Margaret Titcomb (1891–1982), American librarian and writer
- Mary Bradish Titcomb (1858–1927), American painter
- Mary Lemist Titcomb (1852–1932), American librarian
- Mike Titcomb (1933–2008), English rugby union referee
- Sarah Elizabeth Titcomb (1841–1895), American genealogist and writer
- William Holt Yates Titcomb (1858–1930), English artist

== See also ==
- Benaiah Titcomb House, built in 1700, is a historic house in Essex, Massachusetts
- Titcomb Mountain, ski hill located in Farmington, Maine
- Josiah Gilbert Holland, American novelist and poet who also wrote under the pseudonym Timothy Titcomb
