= The Esoteric Character of the Gospels =

1887 / 1888 article by Helena Blavatsky

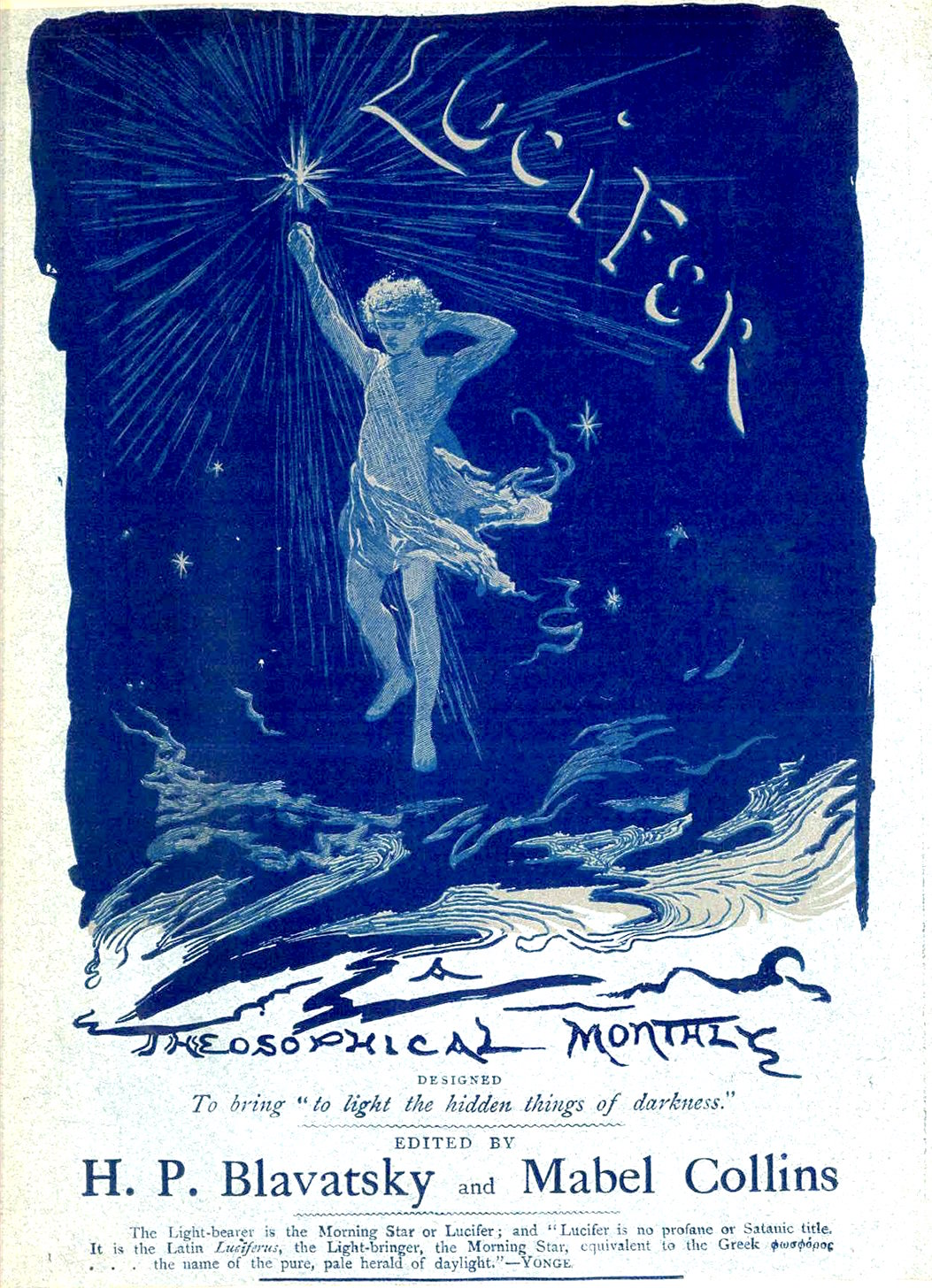
Cover of the magazine Lucifer

"The Esoteric Character of the Gospels" is an article published in three parts: in November-December 1887, and in February 1888, in the theosophical magazine Lucifer; it was written by Helena Blavatsky. (Note: Lucifer, Vol. 1, November 1887, p. 173–80; December 1887, p. 299–309; February 1888, p. 490–96.) It was included in the 8th volume of the author's Collected Writings. In 1888, for this work, the author was awarded Subba Row medal. (Note: When the Theosophical Society was created, the encouraging of "the study of comparative religion, philosophy, and science" was proclaimed his second major task.)

== Analysis of contents ==
=== Versus clerics ===
An American author Gary Lachman, noting Blavatsky's "animus toward the Judeo-Christian ethos," has cited her article in which she writes that "Christianity is now the religion of arrogance par excellence, a stepping-stone for ambition, a sinecure for wealth, sham and power; a convenient screen for hypocrisy." A Russian Indologist Alexander Senkevich has noted that she did not make secrets out of her "skeptical attitude towards the Gospels," considering them unrelated to either Jesus or his Apostles. (Note: Noting in church Christianity the dogmatism generated by the "painful ambition of its hierarchs," Blavatsky regarded it exclusively as a religious sanctification of "power over people.") Joseph Tyson wrote in his book that, according to Blavatsky, for example, in the Protestant camp there are 350 dissenting sects, and she commented that if "one of these may have the approximate truth, still 349 must be necessarily false." A Russian philosopher Lydia Fesenkova wrote that, in Blavatsky's opinion, the Christian sacred books are "magazines of falsehoods," and all of them have served

"as a means for securing power and of supporting the ambitious policy of an unscrupulous priesthood. All have promoted superstition, all made of their gods blood-thirsty and ever-damning Molochs and fiends, as all have made nations to serve the latter more than the God of Truth."

Professor Robert Ellwood wrote that Blavatsky was a ruthless critic of the church tradition of Christianity, whether in relation to "the Church Fathers or modern priests, pastors and missionaries." The reason for her hostility to church Christianity "was what she perceived as arrogance combined with misplaced concreteness." She believed that "churchmen, past and present, whether through intentional deceit or mere stupidity, had concealed the real origin and meaning of Christianity as a vehicle of the ancient wisdom."

=== Historical Jesus ===
A Russian Orthodox theologian, Dimitry Drujinin, wrote that in her article Blavatsky calls Lüd as the "hometown" of Jesus. This indicates that she supported the statements of Talmud that Jesus was the son of a man named Pandira and "lived a hundred years before the beginning of the Gospel events." In his youth, he lived for many years in Egypt, where he "was initiated" in esoteric wisdom. After returning to Palestine, he reorganized the movement of the Essenes, who worshipped him as a teacher. Slandered by his enemies, he was killed in his hometown. Drujinin quotes the article with "He was stoned and then crucified on a tree, on the eve of Passover."

=== Chrestos and Christos ===
Drujinin wrote that, according to Blavatsky, it is necessary to distinguish between Chrêstos and Christos (Christ). The first name, in hers opinion, means neophyte who approaching to Initiation, and the second one she defines in this way: "Christ— the true esoteric Saviour—is no man, but the Divine Principle in every human being." (Note: "Chrestes, Chrestos (Greek). Applied by the Greeks as a title of respect equivalent to 'the worthy.' Chrestes meant an interpreter of oracles. In the language of the Mysteries, a chrestos was a candidate or neophyte, and a christos (anointed) was an initiate. Christ is a mystical expression for the human inner god, while chrest is the good but as yet unregenerated nature.") Drujinin added that she believes that Christians have lost the understanding of the true meaning of the word Christos: "The very meaning of the terms Chrêstos and Christos, and the bearing of both on 'Jesus of Nazareth,' a name coined out of Joshua the Nazar, has now become a dead letter for all with the exception of non-Christian Occultists." He wrote that Christians, according to Blavatsky, only afterwards unfairly put aside "all the other Chrêstoi, who have appeared to them as rivals of their Man-God." The Russian Encyclopedia of Sages, Mystics, and Magicians wrote that in her article Blavatsky "allegorically" proclaims: "Christos was 'the Way,' while Chrêstos was the lonely traveller journeying on to reach the ultimate goal through that 'Path,' which goal was Christos, the glorified Spirit of 'Truth.'" In a like manner Drujinin has quoted hers article:

"To the true follower of the Spirit of Truth, it matters little, therefore, whether Jesus, as man and Chrêstos, lived during the era called Christian, or before, or never lived at all. The Adepts, who lived and died for humanity, have existed in many and all the ages."

Tyson wrote that "sanctification," in Blavatsky's opinion, "was ever the synonym (for) the 'Mahatmic-condition,' i.e., the union of the man with the divine principle (Augoeides) in him." In this connection, he has said that Neoplatonic friars "practiced fasting, celibacy, contemplative prayer, and charity in order to," as Blavatsky writes, "kill one's personality and its passions, to blot out... separateness from one's 'Father,' the Divine Spirit in man."

=== Esotericism in the Gospels ===
While studying the Theosophical doctrine, Drujinin has stated that Blavatsky considers the "story of Jesus Christ," which was told in the Gospels, as a fantasy. In support of this he has quoted hers article:

"Whence, then, the Gospels, the life of Jesus of Nazareth? Has it not been repeatedly stated that no human, mortal brain could have invented the life of the Jewish Reformer, followed by the awful drama on Calvary? We say on the authority of the esoteric Eastern School, that all this came from the Gnostics, as far as the name Christos and the astronomico-mystical allegories are concerned, and from the writings of the ancient Tanaïm as regards the Kabalistic connection of Jesus or Joshua, with the Biblical personifications."

According to French philosopher Édouard Schuré, Christian esotericism in the Gospels is revealed if to approach them from the standpoint of the "Essenian and Gnostic traditions." A religious studies scholar Alvin Kuhn stated that the "Gospels" in ancient times were not "the biographies of one, or of any, living earthly person, but were held as the literary forms of a universal dramatical representation of the experience of our divine souls in the mortal body here on earth."

== Criticism ==
This article by Blavatsky always aroused rejection on the part of those who professed the teachings of Jesus only literally. Thus, a priest Drujinin (Russian Orthodox Church) claimed that the Theosophists "had reduced" Jesus Christ to the level of one of the Adepts and even generally questioned his existence. And moreover:

"The founders of Theosophy deny the importance of Christ's crucifixion. Recognizing within the framework of the concepts karma and reincarnation the possibility of paying by sufferings only for their own sins, they actually represent the sufferings of the Lord Jesus Christ only as a tragicomic mistake."

On the other hand, Alvin Kuhn, being a supporter of Christ myth theory, stated that esotericism "hung up midway" between recognizing the Gospels as documents of early Christian history or treating them as an allegory. He wrote that Blavatsky contributed to this "anomalous" situation: arguing in one place that "Christ— the true esoteric Saviour—is no man, but the Divine Principle in every human being," she in another place supports a thesis about the real existence of the Jewish Adept Jesus. Kuhn proclaimed: "The matter of the existence or non-existence of a certain man in human history is not dual in nature. Either Jesus, the Gospel Figure, was a person in human body, or he was not."

According to Ellwood, many of Blavatsky's "onslaughts" against Christianity, including her attacks on organizations that devoted themselves to "good works such as the Salvation Army, were not always even-handed." Moreover, she apparently didn't know about the nascent liberal branch of Christian theology — "Schleiermacher, Coleridge, Channing, Kingsley and many others" who had nothing to do to the primitive "dogmatism she so hated." Nevertheless, her attacks on church Christianity can be seen as necessary to fulfill the task of the Theosophical Society connected with the formation of a "new spirituality based on an immanent universalism" which opposing aggressive religiosity "she saw all around, whether in European bishops or in missionaries abroad."

== Publications ==
- "The Esoteric Character of the Gospels (I)". Lucifer. 1 (3). London: Theosophical Publishing Society: 173–180. November 1887.
- "The Esoteric Character of the Gospels (II)". Lucifer. 1 (4). London: Theosophical Publishing Society: 299–310. December 1887.
- "The Esoteric Character of the Gospels (III)". Lucifer. 1 (6). London: Theosophical Publishing Society: 490–496. February 1888.
- de Zirkoff, B., ed. (1960). "The Esoteric Character of the Gospels". Collected Writings. Vol. 8. Wheaton, Ill: Theosophical Publishing House. pp. 172–217.

Translations

- "Эзотерический характер Евангелий" [The Esoteric Character of the Gospels]. Скрижали кармы [The Tablets of Karma]. Е. П. Блаватская (in Russian). Translated by Бурмистров, К. Ю. Москва: МЦФ. 1995. ISBN 5-88483-004-1.
- "Эзотерический характер Евангелий" [The Esoteric Character of the Gospels]. Происхождение Начал [Origin of Primary Sources]. Елена Блаватская потомкам (in Russian). Москва: Сфера. 2006. ISBN 5939751644.

== See also ==
- Buddhism and Theosophy
- Christianity and Theosophy
- Esoteric Buddhism
- "Is Theosophy a Religion?"
- Pistis Sophia
