= Gerald Massey =

English poet and Egyptologist (1828–1907)

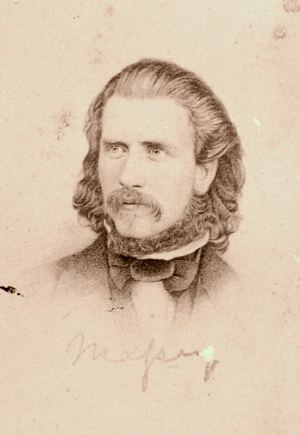
Photograph of Gerald Massey dated 1856

Gerald Massey (/ˈmæsi/; 29 May 1828 – 29 October 1907) was an English poet, critic, political activist, historian, and writer on Spiritualism and Ancient Egypt. He was heavily involved in Christian socialism and Chartism throughout his lifetime.

== Early life ==
Massey was born in Gamble's Wharf, near Tring, Hertfordshire, England, on 29 May 1828 to canal boatman William Massey and his wife Mary. Massey was educated at the local penny school before starting work at a silk mill aged eight. Although no longer receiving formal education, Massey studied John Bunyan and the Bible; after moving to London aged fifteen, he learnt French and continued his self-taught education. He became involved in Christian socialism, joining the Christian Socialist Board and writing poetry for The Christian Socialist. He became associated with F. D. Maurice and Charles Kingsley.

== Later life ==
From about 1870 onwards, Massey became increasingly interested in Egyptology and perceived between Egyptian mythology and the Gospel. He studied the extensive Egyptian records of the British Museum, where he worked closely with curator Samuel Birch and other leading Egyptologists of his day, even learning hieroglyphics at the time the Temple of Edfu was first being excavated.

== Writing career ==
Massey's first public appearance as a writer was in connection with the Chartist journal Spirit of Freedom, and Working Man's Vindicator, of which he became editor. His first volume of poems, Poems and Chansons, was printed privately in 1848. The publication of The Ballad of Babe Christabel, with Other Lyrical Poems (1854) brought Massey to greater attention.

In 1889, Massey published a two-volume collection of his poems called My Lyrical Life. He also published works dealing with Spiritualism, the study of Shakespeare's sonnets, and theological speculation. The title character of George Eliot's novel Felix Holt, the Radical is sometimes thought to have been based on Massey.

Massey's poetry has a certain rough and vigorous element of sincerity and strength which accounts for its popularity at the time of its production. He treated the theme of Sir Richard Grenville before Alfred, Lord Tennyson did, and was praised by Tennyson. His poem "The Merry, Merry May" was set to music in 1894 by Cyril Rootham and later by Christabel Baxendale.

Massey was a believer in spiritual evolution; he opined that Darwin's theory of evolution was incomplete without it:

The theory contains only one half the explanation of man's origins and needs spiritualism to carry it through and complete it. For while this ascent on the physical side has been progressing through myriads of ages, the Divine descent has also been going on – man being spiritually an incarnation from the Divine as well as a human development from the animal creation. The cause of the development is spiritual. Mr. Darwin's theory does not in the least militate against ours – we think it necessitates it; he simply does not deal with our side of the subject. He can not go lower than the dust of the earth for the matter of life; and for us, the main interest of our origin must lie in the spiritual domain.

In regard to Ancient Egypt, Massey first published The Book of the Beginnings, followed by The Natural Genesis. His most important work of Egyptology is Ancient Egypt: The Light of the World, published shortly before his death. Like Godfrey Higgins a half-century earlier, Massey believed that Western religions had Egyptian roots:

The human mind has long suffered an eclipse and been darkened and dwarfed in the shadow of ideas the real meaning of which has been lost to moderns. Myths and allegories whose significance was once unfolded in the Mysteries have been adopted in ignorance and reissued as real truths directly and divinely vouchsafed to humanity for the first and only time! The early religions had their myths interpreted. We have ours misinterpreted. And a great deal of what has been imposed on us as God's own true and sole revelation to us is a mass of inverted myths.

One of the more important aspects of Massey's writings were his assertions that there were parallels between Jesus Christ and the Egyptian god Horus. He argued in The Natural Genesis that both Horus and Jesus were born of virgins on 25 December, raised men from the dead (Massey speculates that the biblical Lazarus had a parallel in El-Asar-Us, a title of Osiris), died by crucifixion and were resurrected three days later. He cited perceived similarities between Christian iconography and Egyptian representations of Horus as evidence of this, and asserted that ancient Gnostic sects considered the two synonymous. While widely rejected by mainstream historians, these assertions have influenced writers such as Alvin Boyd Kuhn, Tom Harpur, Yosef Ben-Jochannan, Acharya S, and Kenneth Grant.

== Criticism ==
Christian theologian W. Ward Gasque solicited twenty Egyptologists worldwide that he considered leaders of the field, including Kenneth Kitchen and Ron Leprohon, to assess some of Massey's assertions. His primary targets were Tom Harpur, Alvin Boyd Kuhn and the Christ myth theory, and only indirectly Massey. Ten out of twenty responded, but most were not named. According to Gasque, Massey's work is not considered significant in the field of modern Egyptology. Gasque reports that those who responded were unanimous in dismissing the proposed etymologies for Jesus and Christ, and one referred to Kuhn's comparison as "fringe nonsense."

Theologian Stanley E. Porter has pointed out that Massey's analogies include a number of errors. For example, Massey stated that 25 December as the date of birth of Jesus was selected based on the birth of Horus, but the New Testament does not include any reference to the date or season of the birth of Jesus. The earliest known source recognizing 25 December as the date of birth of Jesus is by Hippolytus of Rome, written around the beginning of the 3rd century, based on the assumption that the conception of Jesus took place on the vernal equinox. The Roman Chronograph of 354 then included an early reference to the celebration of a Nativity feast in December, as of the fourth century. Porter states that Massey's errors often render his works nonsensical, such as his assertion that Herod the Great was not a historical figure and was merely based on "Herrut", an Egyptian name for the Hydra.

== See also ==
- The Pagan Christ
