= Christianity and Theosophy =

Relation between Christianity and Theosophy

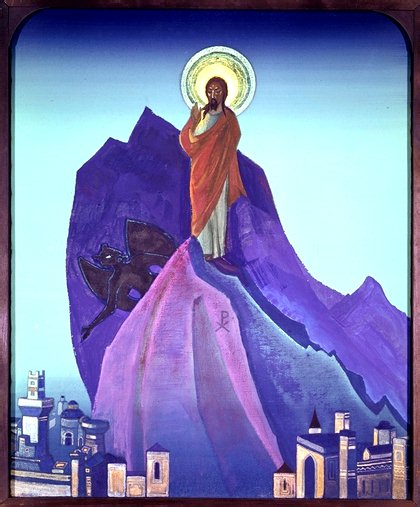
Temptation of Christ, by the theosophist Nicholas Roerich

Christianity and Theosophy, for more than a hundred years, have had a "complex and sometimes troubled" relationship. The Christian faith was the native religion of the great majority of Western Theosophists, but many came to Theosophy through a process of opposition to Christianity. According to professor Robert S. Ellwood, "the whole matter has been a divisive issue within Theosophy." (Note: Gregory Tillett, a religious studies scholar, claimed in his dissertation, "The relationship of Theosophy to Christianity was never straightforward.")

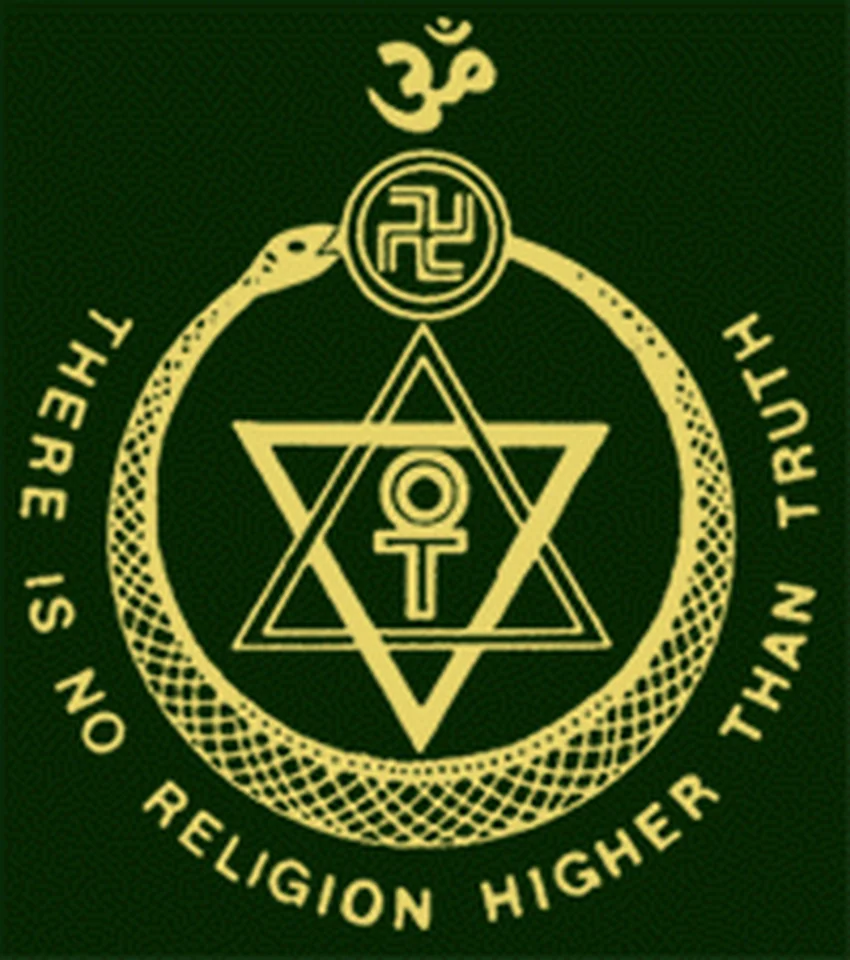
The emblem of the Theosophical Society

== Beliefs ==
=== God ===
According to the Theosophical spiritual Masters, (Note: Goodrick-Clarke wrote that "the very concept of the Masters" is the Rosicrucian idea of "invisible and secret adepts, working for the advancement of humanity." And Tillett stated: "The concept of Masters or Mahatmas as presented by HPB involved a mixture of western and eastern ideas; she located most of them in India or Tibet. Both she and Colonel Olcott claimed to have seen and to be in communication with Masters. In Western occultism the idea of 'Supermen' has been found in such schools as... the fraternities established by de Pasqually and de Saint-Martin.") neither their philosophy nor themselves believe in a God, "least of all in one whose pronoun necessitates a capital H."

A Russian Orthodox cleric and theologian Dimitry Drujinin cited the Theosophical Master Kuthumi: "We know there is in our [solar] system no such thing as God, either personal or impersonal. Parabrahm is not a God, but absolute immutable law... The word 'God' was invented to designate the unknown cause of those effects which man has either admired or dreaded without understanding them."

A religious studies scholar Alvin Kuhn wrote that Theosophist Annie Besant believed: "God is a composite photograph of the innumerable gods who are the personifications of the forces of nature... It is all summed up in the phrase: Religions are branches from a common trunk—human ignorance.

In addition, the Master Kuthumi said, "In our [Tibetan] temples there is neither a god nor gods worshipped, only the thrice sacred memory of the greatest as the holiest man that ever lived."

An American author Gary Lachman, noting Blavatsky's "animus toward the Judeo-Christian ethos," cited her article in which she wrote that the Bible is not the "word of God" but contains at best the "words of fallible men and imperfect teachers."

In The Secret Doctrine Helena Blavatsky stated that "an extra-cosmic god is fatal to philosophy, an intra-cosmic Deity — i.e. Spirit and matter inseparable from each other — is a philosophical necessity. Separate them and that which is left is a gross superstition under a mask of emotionalism." Professor Santucci wrote that she has defined the Supreme in the Proem to The Secret Doctrine as an "Omnipresent, Eternal, Boundless, and Immutable Principle on which all speculation is impossible, since it transcends the power of human conception and could only be dwarfed by any human expression or similitude." John Driscoll, a theologian and author of The Catholic Encyclopedia, wrote in 1912 that Theosophy denies a personal god, and this "nullifies its claim to be a spiritualistic philosophy." (Note: Blavatsky was refusing to accept God as the personality.) Blavatsky proclaimed that the Theosophists believe "in the Deity as the All, the source of all existence, the infinite that cannot be either comprehended or known, the universe alone revealing It, or, as some prefer it, Him, thus giving a sex to that, to anthropomorphize which is blasphemy."

Professor Mary Bednarowski wrote that Theosophists "see the One as the cause of the universe," but not as its creator. When asked who it is that created the universe, Blavatsky responded that, "No one creates it. Science would call the process evolution; the pre-Christian philosophers and the Orientalists call it emanation; we, Occultists and Theosophists, see in it only the universal and eternal reality casting a reflection of itself on the infinite Spatial depths." Russian Christian philosopher Nikolai Berdyaev wrote that in the Theosophical books "the name of God is not mentioned." (Note: Theologian Drujinin wrote that Berdyaev noted, "In the contemporary Theosophy it is difficult to find a teaching about God.") (Note: According to professor Hanegraaff, Blavatskian Theosophy is "an example of Comparative Religion on occultist premises, developed with the express intention of undermining established Christianity.")

=== Jesus ===
According to Blavatsky, Jesus was the grand "philosopher and moral reformer." She considered Jesus as "The Great Teacher," an avatar with healing and demon-exorcising abilities. An American author Joseph H. Tyson stated, "She did not view him as The Second Person of the Blessed Trinity, but a Brahman Perfect Master" with clairvoyance, supernatural powers, and "fakir-like unconcern for the morrow." In Blavatsky's opinion, "Jesus, the Christ-God, is a myth concocted two centuries after the real Hebrew Jesus died." According to Theosophy, the term "Christ" means the personal divinity "indwelling" each individual human.

In December 1887 Blavatsky printed an open letter to the Archbishop of Canterbury, the Lord Primate of England. This editorial letter gave proof to show that "in almost every point the doctrines of the churches and the practices of Christians are in direct opposition to the teachings of Jesus." She always opposed those who understood Jesus' teaching literally. (Note: Professor Williams wrote that one should not understand literally the words of Jesus, "I am the Way, the Truth, and the Life." (John 14.6) He speaks here, not as a historical character, but as "the divine light, the light presumably known to all the wise sages of every age.") Her representation of Jesus as similar of Buddha "grated on Christian nerves." (Note: Curuppumullage Jinarajadasa wrote that Mahachohan, the great Adept, wrote that the seventh principle of man is being named some as Christ, others as Buddha.)

=== Prayer ===
Drujinin wrote that to the question, "Do you believe in prayer, and do you ever pray?" Blavatsky answered: "We do not. We act, instead of talking. ...The visible universe depends for its existence and phenomena on its mutually acting forms and their laws, not on prayer or prayers." Blavatsky "rules out the propriety of prayer, except in the sense of an internal command." She said, "We call our 'Father in heaven' that deific essence of which we are cognizant within us." According to Bednarowski, in Blavatsky's opinion, prayer kills "self-reliance" and "refutes the Theosophical understanding of divine immanence." She stated, "We try to replace fruitless and useless prayer by meritorious and good-producing action."

Berdyaev wrote that the experience of "prayerful communication" with God, revealed to man by the Christian church, is not recognized by the Theosophical teaching. Prayer in Theosophy is only "one of the others forms of meditation."

=== Сondition after death ===
Bednarowski wrote that Blavatsky objected to the Christian interpretations of the afterlife "because they are described as eternal." She stated that, "nothing is eternal and unchangeable." She said, "We believe in no hell or paradise as localities; in no objective hell-fires and worms that never die, nor in any Jerusalems with streets paved with sapphires and diamonds." René Guénon wrote that in the Theosophical "heaven" the condition of man is:

As to the ordinary mortal, his bliss in it is complete. It is an absolute oblivion of all that gave it pain or sorrow in the past incarnation, and even oblivion of the fact that such things as pain or sorrow exist at all."

=== Karma and reincarnation ===
According to The Catholic Encyclopedia, the main Theosophical teachings are karma and reincarnation. Karma is the law of ethical causation.

In the past incarnation the ego had acquired certain faculties, set in motion certain causes. The effect of these causes and of causes set in motion in previous incarnations and not yet exhausted are its karma and determine the conditions into which the ego is reborn.

Reincarnation is directly related to karma. James Skeen stated that the Theosophical teaching about karma and "its relation to forgiveness and faith" contradicts the Bible definitions of these important concepts. Encyclopedia of New Age Beliefs argues that the laws of karma and reincarnation "are really a doctrine of self salvation." And consequently there is no need for "Jesus Christ's substitutionary death for our sins," when the person, who offends, pays himself. (Note: The Master Kuthumi wrote, "Though we may not say with the Christians, 'return good for evil' — we repeat with Confucius — 'return good for good; for evil — justice.'") (Note: Berdyaev stated that "Christianity is a religion of love, and not a religion of justice," therefore, for a true Christian, the law of karma is abolished. Opposed to the Christian doctrines of redemption and punishment, Theosophy offers no remission for evil except "through myriads of reincarnations." Theosophy offers no "living redeemer, no freedom from the power of sin.")

Blavatsky and other Theosophists believed that karma, the "unerring law of Retribution," is a system of penalty "as stern as that of the most rigid Calvinist, only far more philosophical and consistent with absolute justice." Ellwood wrote that, according to Blavatsky, "Karma is an Absolute and Eternal law in the World of manifestation." Karma is the "impersonal force" which brings retribution for thoughts, words, and deeds of men without "destroy[ing] intellectual and individual liberty" in order to demonstrate that men must live with the consequences of their choices. A religious studies scholar Jeffrey D. Lavoie noted that, in Blavatsky's opinion, the soul "must purify itself through cyclic transmigrations." Ellwood has quoted in The Secret Doctrine:

"Intimately, or rather indissolubly, connected with Karma, then, is the law of re-birth, or of the re-incarnation of the same spiritual individuality in a long, almost interminable, series of personalities. The latter are like the various costumes and characters played by the same actor."

Drujinin stated that the concept of reincarnation fundamentally contradicts the most important dogmas of Orthodox Christianity. Moreover, he stated that there are good reasons to believe that the concept of reincarnation, brought into Theosophy, was entered "by the inspiring in it of dark spiritual forces" for the preparation of an appearance of Antichrist. He wrote that the Theosophical doctrine of reincarnation denies the tragedy of death and glorifies it as a positive moment of the cosmic evolution. Depreciating "death, this doctrine thereby devalues life and reconciles man with any suffering and injustice." (Note: Nevertheless, a Russian Christian philosopher Nikolay Lossky believed that "doctrine of reincarnation" is not contradicting Christian teaching.)

== Accusations ==
=== Fraud ===
In September 1884 the Rev. George Patterson, a principal of Madras Christian College, wrote about Blavatsky's occult phenomena: "What if these signs and wonders are proofs of something very different?... Instead of a message from beings of supernal wisdom and power, we shall have only the private thoughts of a clever but not over scrupulous woman." The anti-Theosophical publications in The Madras Christian College Magazine in September 1884 were made by the time of arrival of Richard Hodgson, an expert of the Society for Psychical Research, aimed at studying the phenomena of Blavatsky. The Committee of SPR, after analyzing and discussing Hodgson's research, came with reference to Blavatsky herself to the following conclusion published in December 1885: "For our own part, we regard her neither as the mouthpiece of hidden seers, nor as a mere vulgar adventuress; we think that she has achieved a title to permanent remembrance as one of the most accomplished, ingenious, and interesting impostors in history." According to the Rev. George Patterson, "It is to these phenomena, and to the openly expressed antagonism of Theosophy to Christianity, that the rapid spread of the new cult in India is to be ascribed, and not to any system of positive doctrine." (Note: Washington wrote that Patterson, "Blavatsky's bitter enemy", hated Theosophy for its anti-Christian and anti-European orientation.)

=== Spirit communication ===
Theologian Kuraev wrote that Theosophists' feature is spirit possession. If the usual scientific or philosophical book appears as a result of systematic and consistent reflections of its author, then the theosophical treatises are written as a "dictation of capricious spirits." A person-medium does not have power over the text that is "communicated" to him, he is not fully competent in its planning and word processing. (Note: In Senkevich's opinion, The Secret Doctrine was created under dictation of the Master Morya by the method of automatic writing.) In Drujinin's opinion, Theosophy preaches "reckless" communication with spirits. And the spirits who presented themselves as "teachers-mahatmas" can expel the disciple in general from his body. In confirmation, he quoted Ignatius Bryanchaninov: "The desire to see spirits, curiosity to learn something from them is a sign of the greatest folly and complete ignorance of the moral and active traditions of the Orthodox Church." Theologian Martin noted that the Bible prohibits to practice a communication with spirits. Nevertheless, in 1860 at Zadonsk, Isidore, the Metropolitan of the Russian Orthodox Church, seeing the manifestations of Blavatsky's mediumship, said: "Let not your heart be troubled by the gift you are possessed of, nor let it become a source of misery to you hereafter." According to Blavatsky, mediumship is the contrast of adeptship, because the medium is the "passive instrument of foreign influences, [while] the adept actively controls himself and all inferior potencies."

=== Demonization ===
Mersene Sloan, an editor and Bible teacher, called the theosophical initiation a process of "disguised" demonization, a "gross perversion" of the Christian regeneration.

"The pupil [of Theosophy] becomes an Adept. This is one of many theosophic statements proving the end of the cult's endeavors to be the incarnation of demons in human beings. Of course, it is denied that the masters are demons, but the doctrines and practices of the cult prove them to be such, and such only. Some know it by actual contact with them... It is not, then, a matter of developing latent powers in man that Theosophy seeks, but the subjection of man to the invading powers of demons."

Drujinin argued that Theosophy seeks to "control the world" with the help of magic. Every Theosophist wants to achieve supernatural powers that "will elevated him above other people." The natural continuation of the absence of faith in the "true God" is that the Theosophist, who is a magic practitioner, "considers himself a god." (Note: Nevertheless, professor Radhakrishnan, an Indian philosopher, wrote that supernatural powers are "by-products" of the higher life and "obstacles to samadhi" of the yogi. Only "through the disregard" of these powers, he can gain the liberation.) Drujinin summed up: "Exploring Theosophy, we came to the conclusion that such a muddled, contradictory and fantasy doctrine could have been created only by the mentally ill men!"

=== Satanism ===
The ministers of the Christian churches had related to the Theosophical Society as the "brood of the Evil one." In 1879 Blavatsky wrote that the Christian Church called the Theosophists "infidel emissaries of Satan." (Note: Drujinin proclaimed, "The founders of Theosophy were actively fulfilling the task of their patron—Prince of Darkness." The same way, Skeen declared that Blavatsky's teachings are of "Satanic character.") In theologian Kuraev's opinion, the Theosophists declared that there is no other God at all except Lucifer: "It is 'Satan who is the god of our planet and the only god,' and this without any allusive metaphor to its wickedness and depravity. For he is one with the Logos." (Note: Nevertheless, according to professor Julia Shabanova, a Ukrainian philosopher, in The Secret Doctrine, the interpretation of the definitions of Satan, Lucifer is fundamentally different from Christian declarations.)

Ellwood has quoted in The Secret Doctrine:

Satan represents metaphysically simply the reverse or the polar opposite of everything in nature. He is the 'adversary,' allegorically, the 'murderer,' and the great Enemy of all, because there is nothing in the whole Universe that has not two sides—the reverses of the same medal. But in that case, light, goodness, beauty, etc., may be called Satan with as much propriety as the Devil, since they are the adversaries of darkness, badness and ugliness. (Note: "Satan of the exoteric Jewish and Christian books is a mere figment of the monkish theological imagination.") (Note: Doctor Kuhn wrote that Blavatsky used ancient lore to prove that in their esoteric meaning all the "old legends" of the Evil Ones and the Powers of Darkness refer to no "essentially evil" beings but to the Divine Wisdom of the Sons of Light who had have the principle of intelligence.)

== Confrontations ==
Drujinin noted that Blavatsky "personally took part in the armed struggle against the Roman Catholic Church." In 1866 she was accompanying Giuseppe Garibaldi on his expeditions. In 1867 she with the Italian volunteers "fought at Viterbo and then at Mentana" against French-Papal troops. In the battle of Mentana Blavatsky was "gravely wounded." (Note: In a professor Leo Klejn's opinion, Blavatsky "had a revolutionary's merits." Olcott wrote that in proof of her story Blavatsky showed him "where her left arm had been broken in two places by a sabre-stroke," and made him "feel in her right shoulder a musket-bullet, still imbedded in the muscle, and another in her leg.") In 1941 Jinarajadasa, the fourth president of the Theosophical Society Adyar, informed that Blavatskian Theosophy has been "officially banned by name by the Pope as a dire heresy, and in one month in each year, a prayer is offered to God through the Virgin Mary to save the world from Theosophy." (Note: According to René Guénon, the Catholic Church has petitioned to "condemn Theosophy and to formally declare that 'its doctrines cannot be reconciled with the Catholic faith.' (Decision of the Congregation of the Holy Office, July 19, 1919: Acta Apostolicae Sedis, August 1, 1919, p. 317.)") (Note: In Blavatsky's interpretation of history, the "Vatican especially is seen as a negative, anti-progressive force, animated by 'despotic pretensions'.") (Note: "The Vatican has always been against Theosophy, for Theosophy proposes universal brotherhood and denounces and fights every form of religious dogmatism.")

In 1880, Henry Olcott took it upon himself to restore true Sri Lankan Buddhism and "to counter the efforts of Christian missionaries on the island." (Note: In 1880 Blavatsky and Olcott converted to Buddhism officially. (See here: Buddhism and Theosophy#The Founders of the Theosophical Society.)) In order to accomplish this aim, he adopted some of the methods of Protestant missionaries. An American scholar of religion Stephen Prothero stated that in Ceylon Olcott was performing "the part of the anti-Christian missionary." He wrote and distributed anti-Christian and pro-Buddhist tracts, "and secured support for his educational reforms from representatives of the island's three monastic sects." He used the Christian models for the Buddhist secondary schools and Sunday schools, "thus initiating what would become a long and successful campaign for Western-style Buddhist education in Ceylon." (Note: According to Ellwood, Blavatsky was horrified "by the brutality of religious persecution done in the name of Christianity and by the tactics of the zealous but ill-informed Christian missionaries she encountered in India and elsewhere." "After further interaction with Blavatsky and his own labors on behalf of Asian Buddhists, Olcott developed more and more antipathy to the Christian faith.") Peter Washington wrote that Christian missionaries were furious about the activity of Olcott and other Theosophists.

Theologian Kuraev wrote that Blavatsky allegedly declared that the goal of the Theosophists "is not to restore Hinduism, but to sweep Christianity from the surface of the earth." (Note: In her book Isis Unveiled, Blavatsky compared "the results of Hinduism, Buddhism and Christianity to the detriment of the latter.") Sylvia Cranston wrote that in Britain, the Church of England tried to ban the sale of Lucifer. (Note: For the Christian churches, Lucifer was a "synonymous with Satan.") Rejecting the Christian accusations that the Theosophical Society is a "pioneer of the Antichrist and brood of the Evil one," Blavatsky wrote to the Archbishop of Canterbury that it is "the practical helper, perchance the saviour, of Christianity." (Note: This was after the publication of Hodgson Report. Hodgson believed also that Blavatsky's function in India was "to foster as widely as possible among the natives a disaffection towards British rule." Nevertheless, 35 years after this, Guénon wrote that the Theosophical Society "faithfully served the interests of British imperialism.") In 1893 some members of a Parliament of Religions were Theosophists, and the principal leader of the Church of England declined his support for the Parliament because, according to him, "the Christian religion is the one religion" and he did not see "how that religion can be regarded as a member of a Parliament of Religions without assuming the equality of the other intended members and the parity of their position and claims." (Note: In 1893 at Chicago, Buddhists, Jains, Baháʼís, Muslims, Hindus, and Theosophists "shared a platform" with Catholics, Protestants, and Judaists.)

On December 2, 1994 the Bishops' Council of the Russian Orthodox Church accepted the interdict On the Pseudo-christian Sects, Neopaganism, and Occultism, in which Blavatskian Theosophy was defined as an anti-Christian doctrine. Thus, the Russian Theosophists who counted themselves as Orthodox Christians were excommunicated. Franz Hartmann, a prominent Theosophist, wrote on clerics as follows:

"Every attack made upon the erroneous opinions and the selfishness of the church autocrats is misrepresented by the latter as an attack upon religion; not upon their religious views, but as an attack upon religion itself. Their church is their God, and the interests of the church are their religion; it is all the God and the religion they know; they can form no conception of a God without priestcraft, nor of a religion without church benefits."

== Modern Christian Theosophy ==
In Ellwood's opinion, in addition to the Blavatsky-Olcott line in Theosophy, there was another, quasi-theosophical, attitude to Christianity. In addition to the anti-clerical line in Theosophy, "Christian/Catholic Theosophy" of Kingsford and Maitland arose. In 1882 they published a book The Perfect Way, or the Finding of Christ, which made a great impression on Besant. This book says on the liberation of spirit from matter, a salvation prefigured, after the mystery drama of the Crucifixion and Death of Christ, in His Resurrection.

In her book Esoteric Christianity Besant continued the Theosophical interpretation of Christianity. (Note: Berdyaev wrote that in this book by Besant you can find a number of truths peculiar to the mystical understanding of Christianity, and that, compared to others, this book is less anti-Christian.) In his article Skeen analyzed her book in detail: according to her, a "healthy religion must contain a secret element attainable only by the spiritual elite." To prove that this secret element passed from Jesus to the Apostles, she cites Second Timothy 2:2. The verse reads: "The things that thou have heard from me ('teacher to pupil') among many witnesses, the same commit thou ('in a secret manner') to faithful men who shall be able to teach ('also in a secret teacher to pupil manner') others also." Besant named this esoteric knowledge the Greater Mysteries. The Lesser Mysteries meant the partial uncovering of the deep truths that must first be assimilated before entry into the Greater Mysteries. And Greater Mysteries can only be passed on "'from mouth to ear' as a pupil becomes qualified." In Besant's opinion, a return to the esoteric Christianity of the early ages is "the only way to save Christianity's importance." (Note: Nevertheless, according to Berdyaev, modern "theosophical sects" discredited the "glorious word Theosophia" and forced to forget about the existence of the "genuine Christian Theosophy." He wrote, "We ought to be re-united with the traditions of the theosophy and anthroposophy of J.Boehme, in truth with a Christian theosophy and anthroposophy. And moreover, even more deeply ought we to be re-united with the traditions of the esoteric, hidden Christianity.")

According to Besant, the Christ is "more than the man Jesus." She has three views of Christ: "the historical Christ, the mythic Christ, and the mystic Christ." Skeen has quoted:

"Round this glorious Figure gathered the myths which united Him to the long array of His predecessors, the myths telling in allegory the story of all such lives, as they symbolise the work of the Logos in the Kosmos and the higher evolution of the individual human soul." (Note: Henry Sheldon, professor of theology, wrote that Besant, praising Jesus in ardent words, "makes him a debtor to Eastern wisdom, of which he is assumed to have been a devoted student for many years.")

== Theosophical Christianity ==
In the post-Blavatsky works of Theosophists, the "earlier trenchant anticlericalism" is visibly lacking, and the attitude to Christianity is almost entirely positive. In particular, Annie Besant and Charles Webster Leadbeater demonstrated a new regard for "Catholic-type doctrine and worship, understood esoterically and theosophically." They also viewed Christ, "together with the church's seasons, festivals, and sacraments, as not only symbols of spiritual truth but also as means of transmitting transcendent energies." Large group of Theosophists entered the Liberal Catholic Church, though some have been Anglicans and Roman Catholics. (Note: February 13, 1916 is regarded as "the foundation date" of the Church. "The first public services of the Church in Australia were held in Penzance Chambers in Sydney in April, 1917.") Ian Hooker, former Presiding Bishop of the Liberal Catholic Church, wrote:

"The Liberal Catholic Church arose from the sense of loss of many English theosophists whose new affiliation left them unwelcome in the churches where they had been worshiping, and from the endeavor of these people to find a place of Christian worship, along with freedom of interpretation, in the English branch of the European Old Catholic Church."

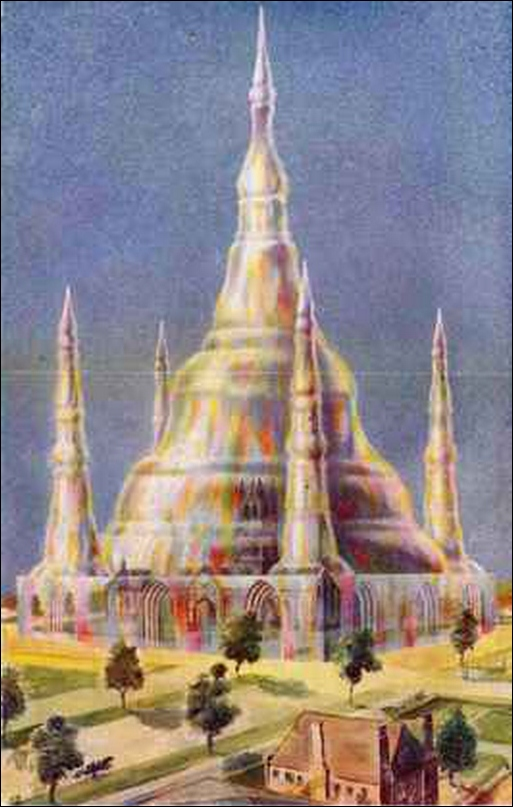
The Completed Eucharistic Form.

The founding bishops of the Liberal Catholic Church were Theosophists J. I. Wedgwood and C. W. Leadbeater who were "actively involved" in the work of the Theosophical Society (Adyar). The doctrine of this Church offered an interpretation of Christianity in which "judgment and salvation after only one life," were substituted by liberation from the necessity for rebirth after many; and in which eschewal of the aftermath of sin "via the redemptive sacrifice of Christ," was substituted by the just and pedagogical receiving of results of whatever has been making in earlier incarnations under the "Law of Karma." The meaning of the rites of the Liberal Catholic Church was expounded in Leadbeater's book The Science of the Sacraments. The author's idea was to save the basic forms of traditional Christianity, but to put "new wine into its old wineskins." The "new wine" was the new nature of the Ancient Wisdom transmitted by the modern Theosophy. According to Ellwood, the Christian rite, "especially when well enacted and well supported by constructive thoughts on the part of all worshipers, creates thought-forms that are vessels and channels of the divine powers evoke by those exalted ideas." (Note: In a book Thought-Forms its authors have provided illustrated descriptions of the "subtle energies" that surround men. The subtle energies "activated and directed by Christian worship" surely correlate with the thought-forms.)

== Basis of mutual understanding ==
Stephan Hoeller, a Regionary Bishop of Ecclesia Gnostica, noted that the including the nineteenth-century polemics materials in the modern Christianity-Theosophy dialogue "is not useful." David Bland, a member of the Theosophical Society since 1970, stated:

"In the workshop recently [November 5–7, 2000] held to explore a greater interface between the Theosophical Society and the Christian tradition, it was recognized that some Christian faith tenets can indeed inhibit dialogue and create what may appear as in surmountable barriers to open exploration. As the participants in that workshop, members of the Society from various Christian backgrounds, worked through these issues, we identified our dilemma. Each of us recognized that dogmas, if accepted at face value, will continue to be a chasm, but we also realized that there are principles that can bridge that chasm. If one accepts the imperative of love, the interpretations that would divide can be placed to the side, and an atmosphere of love and understanding created."

Professor Ellwood, a religious studies scholar and Liberal Catholic priest, proclaimed that Christianity could be rebuilt to be consonant "with the deepest insights of Theosophy, and moreover become for some people a vehicle for the transmission of those insights and the powers latent in them." In his book The Cross and the Grail: Esoteric Christianity for the 21st Century Ellwood wrote:

"The Eastern Orthodox liturgy, a Catholic form of service, suggests the desire to make physically visible what is transpiring on the astral and mental planes by intentionally creating sacramental thought-forms that channel divine energy from the heart of God. The actual correspondence may not always be exact, since no human craft or art could completely reproduce the worlds of the inner planes; but the feeling of color, richness, and unity in diversity is there. In Eastern Orthodoxy, the often-concealed altar behind the iconostasis, a screen covered with icons and pictures of saints, is like the innermost eternal realm of pneuma, spirit, the atma, the God within. This power seems to radiate through the saints with their luminous eyes as though they were beings in the heaven of the mental plane, or Devachan. As the service progresses with its mystical and unforgettable music, its richly-robed clergy moving with the slowness of ancient ritual, and its billowing clouds of incense, a dome of silvery-blue light that merges upward into gold is formed above the congregation, like the onion-shaped domes atop many Orthodox churches. The structure is so exalted that it barely touches the earth, and not all present are able to perceive it directly."

== Christian converts to Theosophy ==
- George Arundale, the third President of the Theosophical Society Adyar. His father, the Rev. John Kay, was a Congregational minister. In 1926 George became Regionary Bishop of the Liberal Catholic Church in India.
- Alice Bailey, initially a member of the Theosophical Society Adyar. She was raised in the "conservative evangelical wing" of the Church of England. At the age of eighteen she became a religious worker in the Young Women's Christian Association. (Note: Bailey's book Reappearance of the Christ has many scriptural references and "seems to function as a text designed to convert Christians" to her version of Theosophy.)
- Annie Besant, the second President of the Theosophical Society Adyar. She was an Anglican by education and, at age twenty, married Rev. Frank Besant. (Note: In childhood Annie was "deeply religious.")
- Helena Blavatsky, a founder the modern Theosophical movement, the co-founder and main ideologist the Theosophical Society. (Note: According to professor Godwin, "the Western esoteric tradition has no more important figure in modern times than Helena Petrovna Blavatsky.") (Note: According to doctor Campbell, in the 19th century the Theosophical Society has been "probably the most important nontraditional or occult group.") She was an Orthodox Christian by birth and education. All her relatives belonged to the conservative people who considered themselves "the good Christians." (Note: Aunt Nadyezhda Andreyevna Fadeyeva, at the age of three, had set fire to the priest's robe at the baptism of her niece, baby Helena Petrovna von Hahn. The biographer wrote, "It was a bad omen.")
- Daniel Dunlop, a member of the Theosophical Society (initially), the founder a magazine The Irish Theosophist. His father, Alexander Dunlop, was a Quaker preacher.
- Franz Hartmann, a member of the Theosophical Society, co-worker of Blavatsky and Olcott at Adyar. He was "educated in the doctrines of the Roman Catholic Church" and wished at one time to become a monk of the Capuchinian Order.
- Geoffrey Hodson, a member of the Theosophical Society Adyar and Liberal Catholic priest. He grew up with "strong conventional Christian beliefs." Hodson worked for the Y.M.C.A. as an organizer. He fostered the esoteric exegesis of the Bible and wrote several works containing "extensive and often profound esoteric interpretations" of the stories from the Old Testament and the life of Jesus.
- Charles Leadbeater, at first an Anglican priest then a member of the Theosophical Society and co-worker of Olcott in Ceylon. (Note: Leadbeater's uncle William Wolfe Capes was an eminent Anglican churchman.) He became after Blavatsky's death "the main ideologist" of the Theosophical Society Adyar. Leadbeater was also the second Presiding Bishop and a "leading theologian and liturgist" of the Liberal Catholic Church.
- Henry Olcott, the co-founder and first President of the Theosophical Society, a "key figure" in the modern history of Sri Lankan Buddhism. His parents had "raised" him a Presbyterian. In 1860, he married the daughter of a priest of the Episcopal Church.
- Gottfried de Purucker, the leader of the Theosophical Society Pasadena. He was "destined for the clergy" by his father, an Anglican minister.
- James Wedgwood, a member of the Theosophical Society Adyar. He gave up "training for the ministry of the Church of England" and became the founding bishop of the Liberal Catholic Church.

== See also ==
- Buddhism and Theosophy
- Buddhism and Christianity
- Christian theosophy
- Hinduism and Theosophy
- Theosophy and Western philosophy
- "Is Theosophy a Religion?"
- "The Esoteric Character of the Gospels"
- "What Are The Theosophists?"
- "What Is Theosophy?"
