= Christabel Baxendale =

English violinist and composer

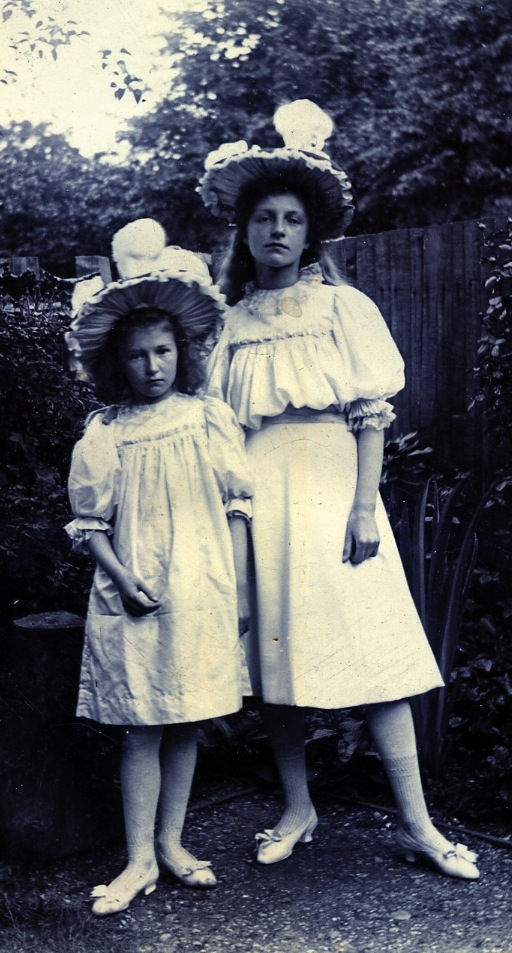
- Ten-year old Christabel Baxendale (left) and her older sister Kathleen, taken in 1896.
- Born: Florence Christabel Baxendale; 28 December 1886; Limerick, Ireland
- Died: 1977 (aged 90–91); Bournemouth, England
- Occupations: Composer, Violinist

Florence Christabel Baxendale (28 December 1886 – 1977) was an English violinist and composer "of considerable talent". She was active in the early 1900s until at least 1921 and gave concerts in the London area, sometimes with her older sister, Kathleen Baxendale, who was a soprano opera singer.

Baxendale was born 28 December 1886. In 1939, she was a music teacher in Uckfield, Sussex.

Baxendale died in 1977 in Bournemouth, aged 90.

== Works ==
Baxendale composed mostly popular songs. Selected works include:

- That Merry, Merry May (setting of a poem by Gerald Massey)
- Plaintive Melody for violin or viola and piano (1951)
- Two little Eyes of blue
- You Came To Me
