= Logan Mitchell (freethinker) =

Logan Mitchell (1802– November 1841) was a British freethinker and writer. Mitchell is best known for his book The Christian Mythology Unveiled.

Mitchell committed suicide in November 1841. He left £500 (equivalent to $42,921 in 2023), for any book publisher who will have "the moral courage" to publish his book. A review of the book in the Sunday Dispatch, which he previously had published for circulation amongst his friends, said "the work is admirably written, and in every respect it is valuable, It evinces learning, acuteness, strong reasoning powers, with excellent feelings, and in all its parts, it shows the author to have been a man of taste, with an elegant and highly-cultivated mind." It was printed several times under different titles, most notably by the Freethought Publishing Company in 1881. Mitchell was an advocate of the Christ myth theory. His views have been compared to Robert Taylor's.

== Quote ==
Jesus Christ in the New Testament, has no reference whatever to any event that ever did in reality take place upon this globe; or to any personages that ever in truth existed: and that the whole is an astronomical allegory, or parable, having invariably a primary and sacred allusion to the sun, and his passage through the signs of the zodiac; or a verbal representation of the phenomena of the solar year and seasons.

== Publications ==
- Religion in the Heavens; Or, Mythology Unveiled (London: Freethought Publishing Company, 1881)
- The Christian Mythology Unveiled (printed privately for the author, 1882)

== See also ==
- Myles McSweeney
- Richard Carlile
