= Samuel Maximilian Rieser =

American philosopher

Samuel Maximilian (Max) Rieser (1893–1981) was an Austrian-born American lawyer and philosopher.

Born in Kraków, where he went to school, he began the study of law in Vienna. His studies were interrupted by World War I, during which he lived in Switzerland. After the war he returned to Vienna, completed his law studies and obtained a position at an insurance company. In 1938, he opened a private law practice. Among his clients was Reinhold Hanisch, a childhood friend of Adolf Hitler. Rieser immigrated to the United States in 1939. Here he earned his living by writing under different pseudonyms for the New Yorker Staatszeitung. After World War II, he worked for different European newsletters and as a translator for an immigrant service organization. Although he had never studied philosophy, he authored a series of essays, reviews and monographs, which appeared in different American philosophical journals. Among other things, he argued for a version of the Christ myth theory, the view that Jesus never existed.

== The True Founder of Christianity and the Hellenistic Philosophy ==
Rieser is occasionally remembered for his book, The True Founder of Christianity and the Hellenistic Philosophy, published in 1979. Here he argues that Christianity was a product of the Hellenistic urban world. Christianity, retroactively set in pre-70 Galilee and Jerusalem, arrived last, not first, in Palestine. It is for this reason that very ancient Christian artifacts are typically found in Rome, but not in Israel. Jesus, the Apostles, and Paul are seen as entirely fictional. The central importance of sacred meals in mystery religions is acknowledged.
