= Gilbert T. Sadler =

Gilbert Thomas Sadler (27 September 1871 - 17 July 1939), best known as Gilbert T. Sadler, was a British Congregational minister and writer.

== Biography ==
Sadler was born in China, he was the son of English missionary Rev. G. Sadler, of Amoy. He was educated at Mansfield College, Oxford. Sadler obtained an M.A. in theology from University of Oxford and a B.A. and LL.B. from London University. He was assistant minister to Rev. John Daniel Jones in Lincoln, 1895. He was pastor of Chester Street Congregational Church, Wrexham (1897-1904) .

His book The Relation of Custom to Law (1919) was reviewed in several law journals.

== Christ myth theory ==
Sadler was an advocate of the Christ myth theory. New Testament scholar Craig A. Evans has noted that Sadler's ideas resemble those of William Benjamin Smith.

== Publications ==
- The Inadequacy of the World's Religions (1871)
- The Inner Meaning of the Four Gospels (1871)
- What Can We Believe? (1905)
- Short Introduction to the Bible (1911)
- Has Jesus Christ Lived on Earth? (1914)
- The Origin and Meaning of Christianity (1916)
- Reason - Love - Vision (1919)
- The Gnostic Story of Jesus Christ (1919)
- The Relation of Custom to Law (1919)
- Behind the New Testament (1921)
- Our Enemy, the State (1922)
- The Roman Praetors (1922)
- The Choice Before the World Today (1923)
- The Fellowship Of Humanity By Reason, Love And Freedom (1923)
- The Husk And The Kernel Of The Pauline Gospel (1923)
- The Law Or the Spirit (1924)
- World-History in a Nutshell (1924)
- A New World by a New Vision (1925)
- What Is Wrong With The Churches? (1929)
