= Kersey Graves =

American philosopher (1813–1883)

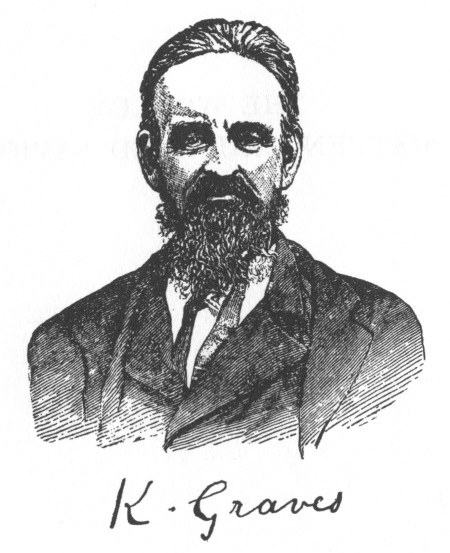
- Born: November 21, 1813; Brownsville, Pennsylvania, U.S.
- Died: September 4, 1883 (aged 69); Richmond, Indiana, U.S.
- Occupations: Rationalist, writer

Kersey Graves (November 21, 1813 – September 4, 1883) was a skeptic, atheist, rationalist, spiritualist, reformist writer, who was popular on the American freethought circuit of the late 19th century.

== Life ==
Graves was born in Brownsville, Pennsylvania. His parents were Quakers, and as a young man he followed them in their observance, later moving to the Hicksite wing of Quakerism. According to one source, Graves did not attend school for more than three or four months in his life, but another source says that he received an "academical education", and at the age of 19 was teaching in a school at Richmond, a career he was to follow for more than twenty years.

He was an advocate of Abolitionism, also interested in language reform, and became involved with a number of radical freethinkers within Quakerism. In August 1844, he joined a group of about fifty utopian settlers in Wayne County, Indiana. In the same month, he was disowned by his Quaker meeting group due to his neglect of attendance, and also setting up a rival group. The groups he was associated with later dabbled in mesmerism and spiritualism.

In July 1845, Graves married the Quaker, Lydia Michiner, at Goschen Meeting House, in Zanesfield, Logan County, Ohio, and they later had five children at their home in Harveysburg, Ohio. They later moved back to Richmond and bought a farm.

The Goschen Meeting House was a centre of the Congregational Friends and were involved with Temperance and Peace, health reform, anti-slavery, women's rights and socialistic utopianism.

Graves' Quaker background conditioned him to the philosophy of the Inner light, whereby all clergy, creeds, and set liturgy in worship were irrelevant, and a hindrance to God's work. This was intensified by Hicks's brand of Quakerism - Quietism - where an individual's spiritual life was most important and all outward manifestations were invalid. The Congregational Friends were to the left of the Hicksites, and withdrew further from even Christianity and eventually a belief in God.

Graves died at his home just north of Richmond, Indiana on 4 September 1883.

== Quotes ==
- 1875: The World's Sixteen Crucified Saviors ;

I desire to impress upon the minds of my clerical brethren the important fact, that the gospel histories of Christ were written by men who had formerly been Jews (see Acts xxi. 20), and probably possessing the strong proclivity to imitate and borrow which their bible shows was characteristic of that nation ; and being written many years after Christ's death, according to that standard Christian author, Dr. Lardner, it was impossible, under such circumstances, for them to separate (if they had desired to) the real facts and events of his life from the innumerable fictions and fables then afloat everywhere relative to the heathen Gods who had pre-enacted a similar history. Two reasons are thus furnished for their constructing a history of Christ almost identical with that of other Gods.

== Writings and legacy ==
Graves started with the belief that religion corrupted truth, and evolved into a writer claiming that all religious belief was false and that Jesus was fiction. His published works include The Biography of Satan; Or, A Historical Exposition of the Devil and His Fiery Dominions. Disclosing the Oriental Origin of the Belief in a Devil and Future Endless Punishment (1865; 4th ed. 1924), The World's Sixteen Crucified Saviors: Or, Christianity Before Christ (1875), and The Bible of Bibles; Or, Twenty-Seven "Divine Revelations": Containing a Description of Twenty-seven Bibles, and an Exposition of Two Thousand Biblical Errors in Science, History, Morals, Religion, and General Events; Also a Delineation of the Characters of the Principal Personages of the Christian Bible, and an Examination of Their Doctrines (4th ed., Boston: Colby & Rich, 1879). His second book was his most famous and is still quoted by atheists and proponents of the Christ myth theory today despite criticism and dismissal by biblical scholars.

Graves is discussed in The Christ Conspiracy and Suns of God by Dorothy M. Murdock aka Acharya S. His shortcomings are discussed by Richard Carrier. His writings could even have been utilized in The Da Vinci Code.

Tom Harpur used Graves as a source in The Pagan Christ and his other books on Jesus Christ in comparative mythology. Atheist activist Madalyn Murray O'Hair was also an admirer of Graves' work.

== See also ==
- Christ myth theory
- Jesus Christ in comparative mythology

== Translated works ==
- Biografia di Satana, Lulu Press, Raleigh (NC), 2018, Italian version of Biography of Satan (1924), translated by Rev. Marco Lupi Speranza, ISBN 978-0-24-499658-1.
