= The Pagan Christ =

2004 book by Tom Harpur

- Cover artwork for first edition
- Author: Tom Harpur
- Language: English
- Subject: Comparative religion
- Genre: Religion, history, Christianity
- Publisher: Thomas Allen Publishers
- Publication date: 2004
- Publication place: Canada
- Media type: Hardcover, Paperback, E-book
- ISBN: 0-88762-145-7
- Dewey Decimal: 270.1
- Followed by: Water Into Wine: An Empowering Vision of the Gospels

The Pagan Christ: Recovering the Lost Light is a 2004 non-fiction book by Canadian writer Tom Harpur (1929–2017), a former Anglican priest, journalist and professor of Greek and New Testament at the University of Toronto, which supports the Christ myth theory. Harpur claims that the New Testament shares a large number of similarities with ancient Egyptian and other pagan religions, that early Church leaders fabricated a literal and human Jesus based on ancient myths and that we should return to an inclusive and universal religion where the spirit of Christ or Christos lives within each of us.

The book was named the Canadian non-fiction bestseller of the year by both the Toronto Star and The Globe and Mail. It was later released under the title The Pagan Christ: Is Blind Faith Killing Christianity? in the United States by Walker Books and in Australia by Allen Unwin. It has also been published in five other languages: in Montreal (Le Christ païen) by Éditions du Boréal, in the Netherlands (De heidense Christus) by Ankh-Hermes bv, in Germany (Der heidnische Heiland) by Ansata Verlag, in Brazil (O Cristo Dos Pagaos) by Editora Cultrix-Pensamento and in Japan (異教キリスト) by Basilico. In 2007, the book became the basis for a CBC documentary, and that same year, Harpur published the more scholarly sequel Water Into Wine: An Empowering Vision of the Gospels.

== Synopsis ==
=== Similarities between Christianity and pagan religions ===
Throughout the book, Harpur details stories and sayings in the New Testament which he claims also appear in ancient myths, particularly pointing out the similarities between Jesus and the Egyptian sun god Horus. He states that a number of pagan cultures in different regions and time periods drew on symbolic themes such as virgin birth, deity father, star in the east, raising of the dead, descent into hell, crucifixion, resurrection, and others. Harpur claims that virtually all words and actions attributed to Jesus in the gospels "originated thousands of years before." Although early church leaders such as Justin Martyr and St. Augustine reportedly acknowledged certain commonalities between pagan religions and Christianity, Harpur explains that the extent of these similarities was hidden until the discovery of the Rosetta Stone in 1799.

=== Plagiarism by the early Christian church ===
According to Harpur, most modern biblical scholars agree the gospels were written many decades after the presumed death of Jesus, and he concludes the scriptures are inconsistent, inaccurate and do not represent a verifiable historical record. Harpur even makes the case that the original authors of the New Testament set out to combine popular pagan myths with prophecies of the Old Testament, never intending for readers to take these allegorical stories literally. In what he calls "one of the most far-reaching tragedies in history", he presents the case that the Christian church in the third and fourth centuries "made a fatal and fateful error", namely inventing the myth of a literal and historical Jesus based on "sublime truth." He further suggests that ultra-conservative Christianists "did everything in their power, through forgery and other fraud, book burning, character assassination, and murder itself, to destroy the crucial evidence." According to Harpur's sources, their propaganda included selectively editing the scriptures and inserting false passages about Jesus into the text of the Jewish historian Josephus.

=== Personal doubt about historic Jesus ===
Asking the question, "can we say with any authority that Jesus of Nazareth actually existed as historical person", he concludes, "I have a very grave doubts we can", adding that his gradual realization that Jesus was a "mythical copy of many preceding saviours" was difficult to accept himself. Consistent with the Jesus myth theory, Harpur contends, "there is no hard historical evidence for Jesus' existence", and "no contemporary non-Christian writer even knew of Jesus." Noting his belief that the Pauline epistles or letters of Saint Paul (which were written before the four gospels), do not mention the parables and miracles of Christ, and make no reference to biographical details like Nazareth, Harpur concludes, "I am compelled, therefore, by my own independent research to agree that Paul's Christ was not Jesus of Nazareth." To that end, he states that biblical literalism "commits idolatry by making a flesh-and-blood man into God", and that worshiping a perfect superman with magical powers who supposedly lived 2000 years ago is not a sustainable path for the future of Christianity.

=== Continued belief in the divine Christ ===
On Harpur's website and jacket cover, The Pagan Christ is said to reveal "a cosmic faith built on these truths that the modern church has renounced", and calling for a "return to an inclusive religion where Christ lives within each of us." According to Harpur, he has spent his entire life searching for answers, and now that he understands the scriptures represent symbolic allegories on a central theme rather than cryptic history, God seems more "relevant and real", and "the Bible comes alive wholly in a new way." Instead of challenging his religious faith, Harpur attests that his discoveries "have made a joyous and life-changing imprint", which have "transformed my view of the future of Christianity it into one of hope."

== Sources ==
The bibliography for The Pagan Christ contains over 80 published authors who are cited in the book. Harpur has been studying the classics and the Bible since he was a Rhodes Scholar in the early 1950s, and he draws on individuals as diverse as St. Augustine and Sigmund Freud for supporting quotes. However, he bases many of his arguments on the writings of relatively unknown authors Alvin Boyd Kuhn (to whom the book is dedicated), Gerald Massey and Godfrey Higgins. He also opens himself to criticism by quoting contemporary atheists such as Earl Doherty and Acharya S, who are often targeted by biblical literalists and apologists. As for "scholars and critics who believe that Jesus was not historical", Harpur presents a list from American historian Harry Elmer Barnes, that was first published 1929, featuring Bruno Bauer, Albert Kalthoff, Arthur Drews, J. C. Stendel, Emil Felden, Peter Jensen, Samuel Lublinski, Gerard Bolland, Gustaaf van den Bergh, Charles Virolleaud, Paul-Louis Couchoud, Gerald Massey, Emilio Bossi, Georg Brandes, J. M. Robertson, G.R.S. Mead, Thomas Whittaker, Edward Carpenter and W. B. Smith. (Andrzej Niemojewski and Deye were noted in the original Barnes list but omitted from the list in The Pagan Christ) (note; Stendel may be a transcription error of Friedrich Steudel and Deye of Albert Bayet)

== CBC documentary ==
The Canadian Broadcasting Corporation aired The Pagan Christ as part of its Doc Zone series in December 2007. Based on Harpur's book and filmed by Banks Productions, it ranked among the year's most-watched television documentaries in Canada, with mostly favourable comments on the CBC website. The program won the Platinumo Remi Award at the Houston International Film Festival and the Golden Camera Award for best documentary at the U.S. International Film and Video Festival in Redondo Beach, California.

== Reception and criticism ==
Vancouver-based pastor W. Ward Gasque strongly critiqued The Pagan Christ in a 2004 article, claiming the "evidence for Jesus as a historical personage is incontrovertible." He reports that only one of the ten Egyptologists who responded to his emails (nine of whom were not identified) were familiar with Kuhn, Higgins, and Massey, and that they unanimously dismissed an Egyptian etymology for Jesus.

Ron Leprohon, Professor of Egyptology at the University of Toronto, has demonstrated that Harpur and his mentor, Alvin Boyd Kuhn, were wrong on at least one point. Harpur and Kuhn's claim that the Egyptian deity Horus and Jesus are the same deity is based on faulty syntax. 'In any event, the name 'Iusa' simply does not exist in Egyptian.'

James A. Beverley, author and professor at Tyndale Seminary in Toronto, wrote a brief article in 2004 called "The Pagan Tom Harpur" for the Evangelical Fellowship of Canada, using a more light-hearted tone than the title suggested.

Stanley E. Porter and Stephen J. Bedard offer a refutation of Harpur's ideas from an evangelical standpoint in Unmasking the Pagan Christ: An Evangelical Response to the Cosmic Christ Idea. The 2006 book from Clements Publishing challenges the key ideas lying at the foundation of Harpur's thesis. Porter, president and dean of McMaster Divinity College in Hamilton, and Stephen J. Bedard, a Baptist minister and graduate of McMaster Divinity, state, 'If the proponents of the Pagan Christ theory had any evidence even close to the quality of The Epic of Gilgamesh material, there would be some reason to consider their claims. Unfortunately for their arguments, their evidence lacks substance and the claims are, therefore, shockingly weak.' Porter and Bedard conclude that there is sufficient evidence for the historicity of Jesus and assert that Harpur is motivated to promote "universalistic spirituality". Porter appeared in the CBC documentary, and David Brady Productions approached the authors about creating a counter documentary for Canada's VisionTV in 2008.

Porter's colleague at McMaster Divinity College, Gordon L. Heath, also produced a paper called "Neither Scholarly or a Solution" which offers a critique of the book. The author concedes he agrees with Harpur on several points such as their shared aversion to rigid fundamentalism and that the church has done shameful things in the past, but disagrees on most other points.

In 2009, theologian and author Robert M. Price wrote a review which raised a number of concerns about Harpur's premise and evidence. Price noted that the book "contains many dubious fact claims".

Bart D. Ehrman, Professor of Religious Studies at the University of North Carolina at Chapel Hill, on his ehrmanblog in 2012 and in his book published the same year, Did Jesus Exist? The Historical Argument for Jesus of Nazareth, lists Harpur along with other "mythicists" such as Price, but does not specifically criticize the details in The Pagan Christ.

In 2013, New Testament scholar Craig A. Evans noted that the views of Harpur and Kuhn have been "thoroughly refuted and is not followed by any reputable historian or Egyptologist."
