= Margaret Titcomb =

American librarian and writer

Margaret Titcomb (1891–1982) was an American librarian and writer.

== Early life and education ==
Margaret Titcomb was born in Denver, Colorado on February 24, 1891, to Ernest and Mary Evelyn Rowbotham. Orphaned in infancy, she was adopted by the lawyer George W. Titcomb and his first wife, Helen Titcomb, both of Brooklyn, NY. Margaret grew up in Brooklyn, NY and went to school at Packer Collegiate School Institute. She went to college at Columbia University and the University of Hawaii where she studied subjects on natural history, anthropology and Spanish.

== Career ==
After college, Margaret became a library assistant at New York's American Museum of Natural History in 1924. From there, she got a job working at Honolulu's Bishop Museum in 1931. While she was working at the Bishop Museum, Margaret was able to enhance the museum library by turning the museum's library cataloging system into an analytic bibliography which was published between the year 1964–1969 by G. K. Hall.

== Books ==
During her career, Margaret wrote several books about Hawaii. They are:

- The Native Use of Fish in Hawaii (1952);
- The Voyage of the Flying Bird (1963);
- Dog and Man in the Ancient Pacific (1969);
- The Ancient Hawaiians: How They Clothed Themselves (1974);
- Native Use of Marine Invertebrates in Old Hawaii (1979).
