= Harold Leidner =

American lawyer

Harold Leidner (31 January 1916 – 13 August 2008) was an American patent attorney and advocate of the Christ myth theory.

== Biography ==
He was born in New York City of Polish-Jewish parentage. He completed his law studies at the College of the City of New York and the New York University School of Law during the 1930s and was admitted in November, 1940. He was registered as a patent attorney in 1956. According to his own statement, he did not practice law as he was attracted to other fields: "[This] legal background has been of great value in evaluating the testimony and credibility of New Testament documents; especially patent law, which deals largely with questions of dating, priority, originality of material, infringement and copying." He regarded Hyman E. Goldin, who in 1948 had published The Case of the Nazarene Reopened, as his principal model. Among other things, Leidner argued for a version of the Christ myth theory, the view that Jesus never existed.

== The Fabrication of the Christ Myth ==
Leidner is occasionally remembered for his book, The Fabrication of the Christ Myth, published in 1999. Here he argues that the gospels abound with anachronisms and geographical errors, because the gospel writers used the Septuagint as the basis for their historical fiction. He also notes that while Josephus describes the Galileans as hardy people, the gospel writers have leper colonies and sickly people all about. New Testament scholarship, in his view, "creates scenarios and takes over material from the social sciences to give the impression that Christianity has an authentic historical origin. The pose of objective research is used to prop up the gospel story but no hard evidence can be found to support that story."

Maurice Casey has criticized Leidner's book. Casey wrote that Leidner was not a "qualified New Testament scholar" and his historical methodology was "appalling".
