= Benaiah Titcomb House =

Historic house in Massachusetts, United States

- U.S. National Register of Historic Places
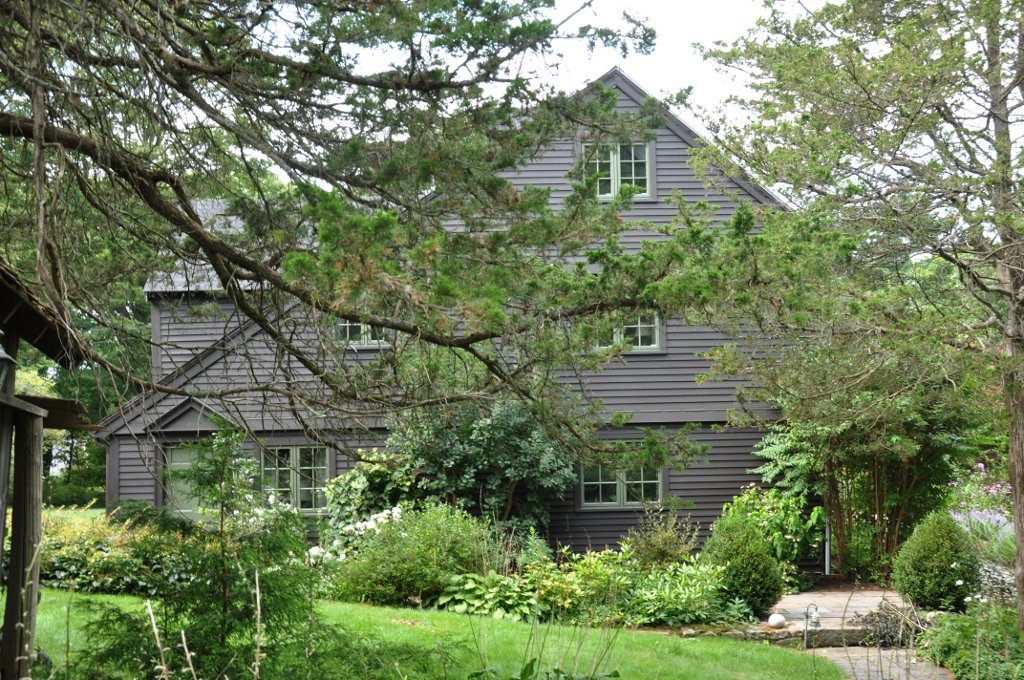

- Location within Massachusetts Location within the United States
- Location: 189 John Wise Avenue, Essex, Massachusetts
- Coordinates: 42°39′5″N 70°47′49″W
- Built: 1700; 326 years ago
- Architectural style: Colonial
- MPS: First Period Buildings of Eastern Massachusetts TR
- NRHP reference No.: 90000208
- Added to NRHP: March 9, 1990

The Benaiah Titcomb House is a historic First Period house in Essex, Massachusetts. The oldest part of the house, built c. 1700 in Newburyport, was a two-story section two rooms wide, with a central chimney. Sometime before the end of the First Period (c. 1720s) a shed-style leanto addition was added to its rear (the side now facing the street), giving it a saltbox appearance. The house was moved to its present location in 1917, oriented to provide views of the coast. At this time a new chimney was provided, and a large dormer was added to the rear to expand the upstairs living space.

The builder, Benaiah Titcomb, was the son of William Titcomb, an early settler of the area. The house was added to the National Register of Historic Places in 1990.

== See also ==
- National Register of Historic Places listings in Essex County, Massachusetts
