= Alvin Boyd Kuhn =

American Theosophist writer (1880–1963)

- Columbia graduation photo, 1931
- Born: September 22, 1880; Franklin County, Pennsylvania U.S.
- Died: September 14, 1963 (aged 82); Morristown, New Jersey U.S.
- Education: B.A., Ph.D in Theosophy (Columbia)
- Alma mater: Columbia University
- Occupations: Lecturer and writer
- Spouse: Mary Grace Leippe

Alvin Boyd Kuhn (September 22, 1880 – September 14, 1963) was an American Theosophist, lecturer, and self-published author. He was a proponent of the Christ myth theory.

== Biography ==
Born in Franklin County, Pennsylvania, Kuhn studied the Ancient Greek language at university. He obtained his B.A. in 1903 and started his career working as a language teacher in high schools. He enrolled in summer sessions at Columbia University in 1926 and 1927, and then quit teaching to devote to full-time studies in 1927. His thesis, Theosophy: A Modern Revival of the Ancient Wisdom was, according to Kuhn, the first instance in which an individual has been "permitted" by any modern American or European university to obtain his doctorate with a thesis on Theosophy. Kuhn later expanded his thesis into his first book of the same name in 1930. After obtaining his Ph.D. in 1931, he returned to teaching for one year, but then spent the next 30 years writing, lecturing, and running his own publishing house, Academy Press in Elizabeth, New Jersey.

Highly influenced by the work of Gerald Massey and Godfrey Higgins, Kuhn contended that the Bible derived its origins from other Pagan religions and much of Christian history was pre-extant as Egyptian mythology. He also proposed that the Bible was symbolic and did not depict real events, and argued that the leaders of the church started to misinterpret the Bible at the end of the third century.

The author of over 150 books, essays and published papers, Kuhn completed his final book, A Rebirth for Christianity, shortly before his death on September 14, 1963, in Morristown, New Jersey. At the time of his death, he left two unfinished hand-written manuscripts. Several of his works have been published or reprinted posthumously, and many are available electronically.

== Reception ==
Some mythicist authors including Tom Harpur were influenced by Kuhn. Harpur dedicated his 2004 book, The Pagan Christ to Kuhn, calling him "a man of immense learning and even greater courage" and "one of the single greatest geniuses of the twentieth century" [who] "towers above all others of recent memory in intellect and his understanding of the world's religions." Harpur notes that Kuhn gave nearly 2,000 public lectures which were lengthy, detailed and well-attended, but claims that Kuhn's self-publishing may have resulted in a lack of attention to his work.

Kuhn's works have been dismissed by mainstream academia for their lack of sources and documentation, misrepresentation of linguistics, misplacement of quotations, and so forth. New Testament scholar Craig A. Evans has noted that the views of Harpur and Kuhn have been "thoroughly refuted and is not followed by any reputable historian or Egyptologist."

== Selected publications ==
- Esoteric Structure of the Alphabet (1900)
- Easter: The Birthday of the Gods (1922, 2009)
- Halloween: A Festival of Lost Meanings (1922, 2014)
- Theosophy: A Modern Revival of Ancient Wisdom (1930, 2009)
- Mary Magdalene and Her Seven Devils (1936, 2013)
- The Root of All Religion (1936)
- The Lost Light: An Interpretation of Ancient Scriptures (1940)
- Who is this King of Glory? A Critical Study of the Christos-Messiah Tradition (1944)
- Sex as Symbol: The Ancient Light in Modern Psychology (1945)
- The Tree of Knowledge (1947, 2012)
- The Shadow of the Third Century: A Revaluation of Christianity (1949)
- India's True Voice: A Critique of Oriental Philosophy (1955)
- Prayer and Healing (1960)
- The Lost Key to the Scriptures (1960)
- A Rebirth for Christianity (1963, 1971, 2005)
- The Ultimate Canon of Knowledge (1963, 2011)
- Hark! Messiah Speaks: A Philosophical Review of the Krishnamurti Teachings (1985)
- Christ's Three Days in Hell: Revelation of an Astounding Christian Fallacy (1990)
- Case of the Missing Messiah (1990)

== See also ==
- Christ myth theory
- Gerald Massey
- Kersey Graves
- E. A. Wallis Budge
- Godfrey Higgins
- Tom Harpur
- Theosophy
- The Pagan Christ
