= Sarah Elizabeth Titcomb =

American genealogist and writer (1840–1895)

- Born: June 26, 1840; Lowell, Massachusetts, U.S.
- Died: April 15, 1895 (aged 54)
- Occupation(s): Genealogist, writer

Sarah Elizabeth Titcomb was an American genealogist and writer.

Titcomb was born in Lowell, Massachusetts. She took interest in genealogy and was the author of Early New England People (1882).

Titcomb was an advocate of what was known in the 19th century as the "mind-cure". She wrote the book Mind-Cure on a Material Basis (1885). Titcomb believed that disease could be caused and cured by imagination and the mind. According to Titcomb the success of the cure or of any kind of prayer was based on the concentration of thought and not to any underlying theology. Her theories outlined in the book received criticism from theologians Mary Baker Eddy and James Henry Wiggin.

She also wrote Aryan Sun Myths: The Origin of Religions (1889), a book on comparative religion and solar myths. Titcomb was a proponent of the Christ Myth theory, according to a review of her book she held the view that Jesus Christ was a personification of a solar deity.

== Publications ==
- Early New England People (1882)
- Mind-Cure on a Material Basis (1885)
- Aryan Sun Myths: The Origin of Religions (1889) [with an introduction by Charles Morris]
