= Myles McSweeney =

Myles McSweeney (1814–1881) was an Irish Chartist, mythologist and secularist writer.

McSweeney was born in Northern Ireland but moved to London. He was influenced by the views of Robert Taylor and wrote for the National Reformer and Secular Chronicle.

He was a former Catholic who became anti-Christian. Historian Steven Fielding has described McSweeney as a "leading secularist lecturer in London's proletarian clubland."

McSweeney was an advocate of the Christ myth theory and lectured on the subject. He was known for having reduced "Christ to a Solar Myth". In the 1870s he associated with Charles Bradlaugh.

== Selected publications ==
- Two Visions: The Pope and Old Nick, The Pan-Anglican Synod and Bishop Colenso (1867)
- Moses and Bacchus: A Mythological Parallel (1874)
- Buddhism and Christianity: A Parallel (1876)
