= Godfrey Higgins =

English magistrate and archaeologist (1772–1833)

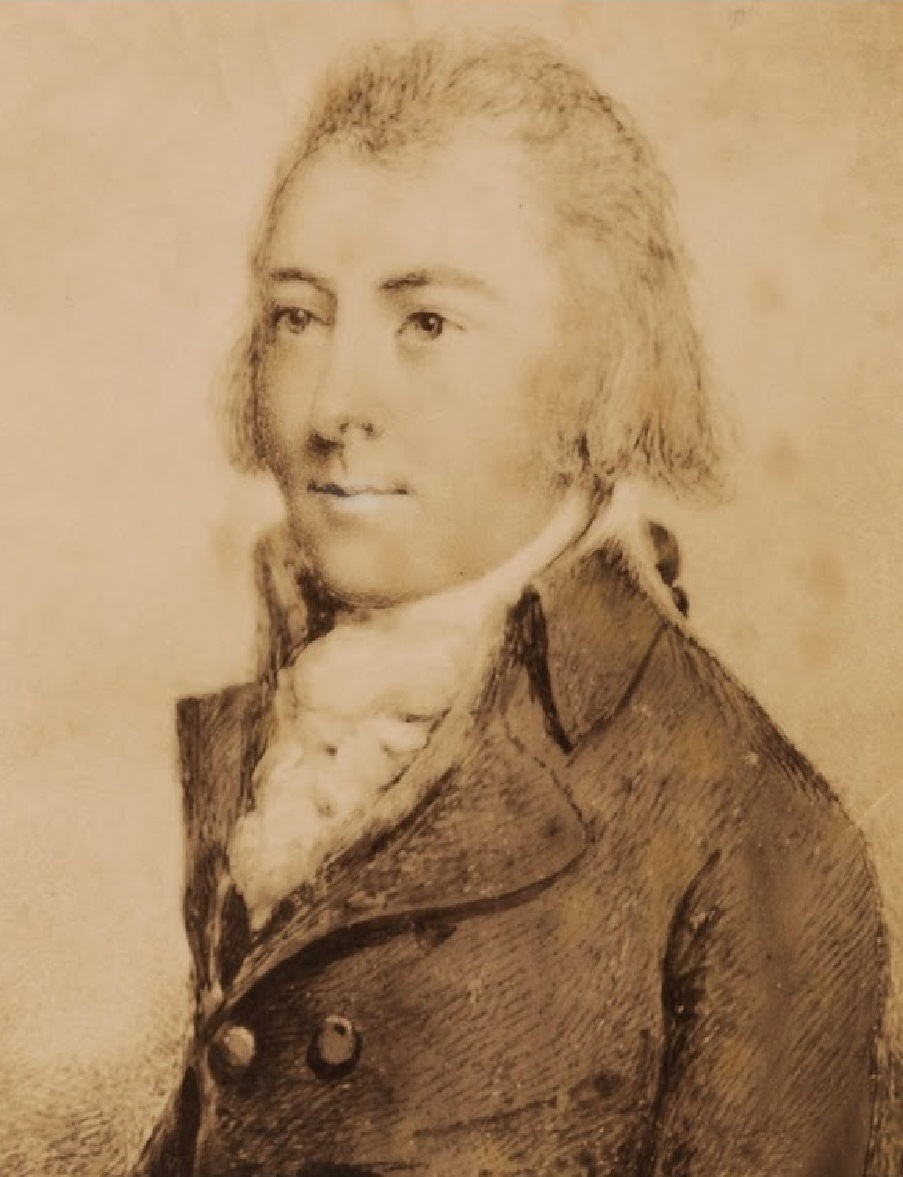
- Detail of a miniature of Higgins
- Born: Godfrey Higgins; 30 January 1772; Owston, Yorkshire
- Died: 9 August 1833 (aged 61); Cambridge
- Occupations: magistrate; mythographer
- Years active: 1800–1833
- Notable work: Anacalypsis; The Celtic Druids

Godfrey Higgins (30 January 1772 in Owston, Yorkshire – 9 August 1833 in Cambridge) was an English magistrate and landowner, a prominent advocate for social reform, historian, and antiquarian. He wrote concerning ancient myths. His book Anacalypsis, was published posthumously, in which he asserts a commonality among various religious myths, which he traces back to the supposed lost religion of Atlantis. He has been termed a "political radical, reforming county magistrate and idiosyncratic historian of religions".

== Life ==
=== Early career ===
Higgins was the son of Godfrey Higgins of Skellow Grange, near Doncaster. He was educated in Hemsworth before being admitted to Emmanuel College, Cambridge in 1790, and transferring to Trinity Hall in 1791. He later studied law at the Inner Temple, but was not granted a license to practice law, and refrained from practice. When Napoleon threatened an invasion of the United Kingdom, Higgins joined the Volunteer Corps and became a Captain of the Third West York Militia. In 1800 he married Jane Thorpe, who gave birth to his son, also named Godfrey, and two daughters, Jane and Charlotte. After Higgins' promotion to the rank of major in 1808, he resigned from the Volunteer Corps citing a severe fever as reason. Soon thereafter he was appointed as magistrate or justice of the peace in Yorkshire.

=== Reformist activities ===
Higgins' work as a magistrate featured reformist campaigns, as part of which he "courageously exposed the scandalous treatment of pauper lunatics and campaigned for Parliamentary Reform, criticizing excessive taxation, the Corn Laws, and the exploitation of children in factories". He was also favoured disestablishing the Church of Ireland. In 1814 he had a major role in uncovering the abuse of patients at the York Lunatic Asylum after rumours of serious misconduct had come to his attention. He joined Quaker William Tuke in agitating for reform. In a surprise visit he forced staff to open doors which revealed female patients kept in "a number of secret cells in a state of filth, horrible beyond description...the most miserable objects I ever beheld." Most of the staff were dismissed and Higgins was able to secure a government enquiry into the management of the asylum, at which he gave evidence. Higgins was appointed as a Governor of the Asylum. He proceeded to investigate a suspicious fire that had destroyed many of the asylum's records, concluding that it was unlikely to have started by accident.

=== Writings on mythology ===
He developed a regimen to study the meaning of life and religion, and wrote:

I came to a resolution to devote six hours a day to this pursuit for ten years. Instead of six hours daily for ten years, I believe I have, upon the average, applied myself to it for nearly ten hours daily for almost twenty years. In the first ten years of my search I may fairly say, I found nothing which I sought for; in the latter part of the twenty, the quantity of matter has so crowded in upon me, that I scarcely know how to dispose of it.

A keen antiquarian, Higgins was a Fellow of the Society of Antiquaries. According to Ross Nichols, Higgins was also a "Chosen Chief" of the Order of Druids, founded by John Toland in 1717. Higgins was claimed a member of An Uileach Druidh Braithreaches (The Druid Order), an ancient Druid order that predates the Hermetic Order of the Golden Dawn; however, these claims are unsubstantiated. Regardless, Higgins demonstrated extensive knowledge and familiarity with the traditions of Druid orders in his work, The Celtic Druids.

Higgins' wife died on 18 May 1822. Higgins' own death, on 9 August 1833, resulted from an illness which he suffered while attending a meeting of The British Association for the Advancement of Science at Cambridge.

== Writings ==
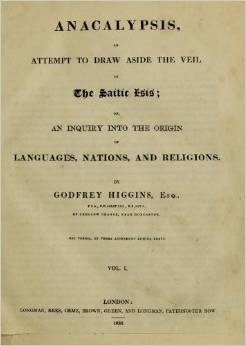
Anacalypsis by Higgins, first published posthumously in 1836

Higgins' main writings were part of the syncretism of the day, which was an attempt to associate Biblical narratives to evidence emerging about other religious traditions. Higgins discussed, and argued with, other authors of this tradition such as Jacob Bryant, Roger O'Connor and William Jones. Higgins' own writings, especially Anacalypsis, were later to have a major influence on the development of Theosophy, through the publications of Helena Blavatsky.

According to Ronald Hutton, Higgins' Anacalypsis says that,

the megalithic remains scattered across the world had been the works of a great nation unknown to history, which had discovered religion and writing. This had given its system of spirituality and philosophy to the ancient Indians, Chaldeans, Hebrews, Egyptians, and Druids alike, based on a veneration of the sun with a threefold personification of deity and a myth of a saviour god who dies and then returns. Higgins identified this nation with the drowned land of Atlantis, hitherto regarded as a myth in itself. This device not only dealt with the question of why no objective evidence of the ancestral civilization remained, but effectively turned the Atlanteans into a blank sheet upon which an ideal religion could be delineated, composed of the writer's favourite aspects of those known to history. In Higgins's scheme, the ancient knowledge had been hopelessly corrupted by the Christian churches, and needed now to be reconstructed.

These ideas "lay dormant for about forty years, and was then taken up and given a considerable popularity by one of the century's truly international figures, Helena Petrovna Blavatsky".

Hutton describes Higgins as an "occultist and mystic", and Nicholas Goodrick-Clarke also terms him an "occultist". Nevertheless, Wouter Hanegraaff, who has written a detailed history of esotericism, says that Higgins had no interest in either occultism or esotericism. Higgins main interests were the history of religious beliefs and practical sociology.

=== Principal works ===
- Horae Sabbaticae, published in 1826, was a study of the Sabbath. Higgins recommended the Sabbath remain a festival instead of a "gloomy" fast.
- The Celtic Druids, published in 1827 and 1829 as three parts, was intended as a precursor to Anacalypsis. The Celtic Druids was "an attempt to show that the druids were the priests of oriental colonies who emigrated from India, were the introducers of the First or Cadmean System of Letters, and the builders of Stonehenge, Carnac, and other Cyclopean works in Asia and Europe." Higgins prefaced the 1829 second edition stating that he was preparing a review of "all the ancient Mythologies of the world, which, however varied, and corrupted in recent times, were originally one, and that one founded on principles sublime, beautiful, and true." This review would become Anacalypsis.
- An Apology for the life and character of the celebrated Prophet of Arabia called Mohamed, or the Illustrious was published in 1829.
- Anacalypsis was written in 1833 and published posthumously in 1836 as two quarto volumes numbering 1,436 pages with meticulous references to hundreds of books. Anacalypsis was printed initially as a limited edition of 200 copies, reprinted partially in 1878, and reprinted completely in a limited edition of 350 copies in 1927. The full title is Anacalypsis; An Attempt to Draw Aside the Veil of the Saitic Isis; or an Inquiry into the Origin of languages, Nations and Religions. The book is a review of the history of religions; however, due to his death Higgins was unable to complete the final chapter on Christianity. In it he claims that the Druids and Jews originated in India, that Abraham is really Brahma, and that there is a secret "pandeist" global movement.

=== Quotations ===
- In Anacalypsis Higgins asserts a commonality among various religious myths:

'"One thing is clear—the mythos of the Hindus, the mythos of the Jews and the mythos of the Greeks are all at bottom the same; and what are called their early histories are not histories of humankind, but are contrivances under the appearance of histories to perpetuate doctrines." Higgins bluntly declares that every ancient author, without exception, has come to us through the medium of Christian editors who have "either from roguery or folly, corrupted them all.”

- In the same publication Higgins makes some interesting claims, stating that all the Greek Gods and Goddesses of Greece were black, such as Jupiter: "Osiris and his Bull were black; all the Gods and Goddesses of Greece were black: at least this was the case with Jupiter, Bacchus, Hercules, Apollo, Ammon.The Goddesses Venus, Isis, Hecati, Diana, Juno, Metis, Ceres, Cybile, are black. The Multi-mammia is black in the Campidoglio at Rome, and in Montfaucon, Antiquity explained." Page 138
- In Anacalypsis he states that the Jews of Jacob or Israel were Ethiopians:

"There seems to be nothing improbable in these Ethiopians being the tribe of the Jews—the tribe of Jacob or Israel. I think these Ethiopians did come under Jacob, and did settle in Goshen, and gave the names of Maturea and Avaris to the city in which they dwelt." Page 399

- In Anacalypsis he states that the Jews of Asia minor were a tribe and colony of black Buddhists from India: "Solomon was a personification or incarnation of wisdom, and the Jews, of Asia Minor were a tribe or colony from India, of black Buddhists, at or about the same time with the Ioudi to Syria, under the Brahmin."
- He also states that all the hero Gods and saviours were black too.

"All the hero Gods Theseus, Bacchus, Æsculapius, &c., were saviours and black saviours too. These black icons were made when man himself was black. He made his God after himself, and then said that man was made after the image of God."

== See also ==
- Gerald Massey
- Kersey Graves
- Druidry
- Freemasonry
