= Acharya S =

American Christ myth theorist (1960–2015)

Dorothy Milne Murdock
- Publicity photo of Murdock
- Born: March 27, 1960; Massachusetts, U.S.
- Died: December 25, 2015 (aged 55)
- Education: Franklin & Marshall College
- Writing career
- Pen name: Acharya S
- Years active: 1995–2014
- Subject: History of religions
- Notable works: The Christ Conspiracy: The Greatest Story Ever Sold (1999), Did Moses Exist? The Myth of the Israelite Lawgiver (2014)
- Website: truthbeknown.com

Dorothy Milne Murdock (March 27, 1960 – December 25, 2015), better known by her pen names Acharya S and D. M. Murdock, was an American writer supporting the Christ myth theory, which asserts that Jesus never existed as a historical person, but was rather a mingling of various pre-Christian myths, solar deities and dying-and-rising deities.

She wrote and operated a website focused on history, religion and spirituality, and astro-theology. She asserted the pre-Christian civilizations understood their myths as allegorical, but Christians obliterated evidence by destroying or suppressing literature after they attained control of the Roman Empire, leading to widespread illiteracy in the ancient world, ensuring the mythical origins of Jesus's story was hidden. She argued the Christian canon, as well as its important figures, were based on Roman, Greek, Egyptian, and other cultures' myths.

== Life ==
Murdock was born to James Milne Murdock and Beatrice Murdock in Massachusetts, and grew up in Avon, Connecticut. She received a Bachelor of Liberal Arts degree in Classics and Greek Civilization from Franklin and Marshall College, then spent a year at the American School of Classical Studies at Athens, Greece. She had one son.

She died of liver cancer on December 25, 2015. She was known as "Dori" to her loved ones.

== Writing career ==
Murdock began her website, Truth Be Known, in 1995. 1999, as Acharya S, she published her first book, The Christ Conspiracy: The Greatest Story Ever Sold, arguing the Jesus story is a fabrication. Her 2007 book, Who Was Jesus? Fingerprints of The Christ continues the theme of The Christ Conspiracy by expanding her theory questioning the historicity of Jesus, alleging "early Christian history to be largely myth, by sorting through available historical and archaeological data." In 2009, she released Christ in Egypt: The Horus-Jesus Connection and The Gospel According to Acharya S.

Murdock also wrote refutations of ancient astronauts theories, asserting they "may be prompted by the same type of motivation that produced the Bible, a chronicle largely consisting of the plagiarized myths of other cultures" re-fashioned as 'fact' concerning purported legend-based characterizations, and may be driven by the attempt to validate biblical myth as historical under a different 'interpretation'."

== Reception ==
Murdock's work received strong criticism from New Testament scholars and historians of early Christians. Agnostic New Testament scholar Bart D. Ehrman wrote in his Did Jesus Exist?: The Historical Argument for Jesus of Nazareth that "all of Acharya's major points are in fact wrong" and her book "is filled with so many factual errors and outlandish assertions that it is hard to believe the author is serious". Taking her as representative of some other writers about the Christ myth theory, he continues "Mythicists of this ilk should not be surprised that their views are not taken seriously by real scholars, mentioned by experts in the field, or even read by them".

Emeritus Professor of New Testament Languages and Literature at the University of Nottingham Maurice Casey criticized her work for "her anti-Christian outlook, a lack of any proper sense of reality, failure to give adequate references, inability to interpret primary sources correctly, and dependence on inaccurate out-of-date secondary sources rather than primary evidence."

Baptist comparative religion scholar Clinton Bennett compares her views to those of radical freethinker Robert Taylor (nicknamed "the Devil's chaplain"), secularist MP and Christ-mythicist John M. Robertson, and American mythographer Joseph Campbell. Butler University religion professor James F. McGrath describes her viewpoint as one that "once had some currency among scholars" in the 19th and early 20th centuries, but was subsequently abandoned.

The book received mixed reviews among conspiracy theorists and supporters of the Christ myth theory. Writer Russ Kick, in his book You Are Being Lied To, describes The Christ Conspiracy as "an essential book for anyone who wants to know the reality behind the world's dominant religion". Conspiracy theorist and publisher Kenn Thomas calls her a "great chronicler of the conspiracy known as Christianity".

Atheist activist and Christ mythicist Richard Carrier criticized her use of the inscriptions at Luxor to make the claim that the story of Jesus' birth was inspired by the Luxor story of the birth of Horus. Theologian and Christ-mythicist Robert M. Price also criticized Murdock's first book, while promoting her Suns of God: Krishna, Buddha and Christ Unveiled in The Pre-Nicene New Testament: Fifty-Four Formative Texts, and writing the foreword to her Who Was Jesus?: Fingerprints of the Christ.

== Publications ==
- Murdock, D.M. (as Acharya S) (1999). The Christ Conspiracy: The Greatest Story Ever Sold. Kempton, Illinois: Adventures Unlimited Press. ISBN 0-932813-74-7.
- Murdock, D.M. (as Acharya S) (2004). Suns of God: Krishna, Buddha and Christ Unveiled. Kempton, Illinois: Adventures Unlimited Press. ISBN 1-931882-31-2.
- Murdock, D.M. (2007). Who Was Jesus? Fingerprints of The Christ. Stellar House Publishing. ISBN 978-0-9799631-0-0.
- Murdock, D.M. (2009). Christ in Egypt: The Horus-Jesus Connection. Stellar House Publishing. ISBN 978-0-9799631-1-7.
- Murdock, D.M. (2009). The Gospel According to Acharya S. Stellar House Publishing. ISBN 978-0-9799631-2-4.
- Murdock, D.M.; Joseph, Peter (2011). The Zeitgeist Sourcebook - Part 1: The Greatest Story Ever Told (PDF). Archived from the original (PDF) on July 28, 2019.
- Murdock, D.M. (2014). Did Moses Exist? The Myth of the Israelite Lawgiver. Stellar House Publishing. ISBN 978-0-9799631-8-6.

== See also ==
- Historicity of Jesus
