= Tom Harpur =

Canadian biblical scholar and journalist (1929–2017)

The Reverend Tom Harpur
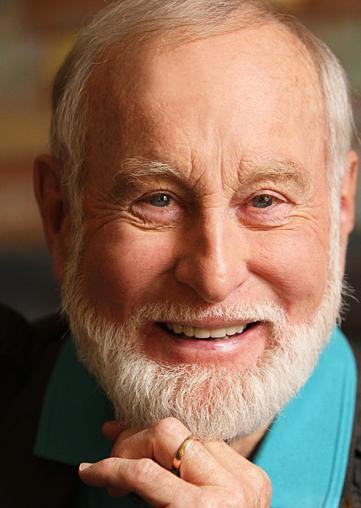
- Born: Thomas William Harpur; April 14, 1929; Toronto, Ontario, Canada
- Died: January 2, 2017 (aged 87); Lion's Head, Ontario, Canada
- Occupations: Biblical scholar; cleric; columnist; broadcaster
- Known for: Toronto Star religion editor
- Spouses: Mary Clark (m. 1956, divorced) Susan Coles (m. 1980)
- Children: 3

Ecclesiastical career
- Religion: Christianity (Anglican)
- Church: Anglican Church of Canada
- Ordained: 1956 (priest)
- Congregations: St. John's York Mills, North York; St. Margaret's-in-the-Pines, Scarborough

Academic background
- Education: University College, Toronto; Oriel College, Oxford; Wycliffe College, Toronto

Academic work
- Discipline: Biblical studies; theology
- Sub-discipline: New Testament studies
- Institutions: Wycliffe College, Toronto
- Notable works: The Pagan Christ (2004)
- Website: tomharpur.com

Thomas William Harpur (April 14, 1929 – January 2, 2017) was a Canadian biblical scholar, columnist, and broadcaster. An ordained Anglican priest, he was a proponent of the Christ myth theory, the idea that Jesus did not exist but is a fictional or mythological figure. He was the author of a number of books, including For Christ's Sake (1986), Life after Death (1996), The Pagan Christ (2004), and Born Again (2011 and 2017).

== Background and education ==
Born in the east end of Toronto, Ontario, to an evangelical family, on April 14, 1929, Harpur earned a Bachelor of Arts (BA) degree with honours in 1951 at University College at the University of Toronto, where he won the Jarvis Scholarship in Greek and Latin, the Maurice Hutton Scholarship in Classics, the Sir William Mulock Scholarship in Classics, and the Gold Medal in Classics. He went on to study literae humaniores ("greats" or classics) at Oriel College at the University of Oxford as a Rhodes Scholar from 1951 to 1954 where he read the ancient historians (Herodotus, Thucydides, and Tacitus) completely in their original texts. He graduated in 1954 with a BA degree and was conferred a Master of Arts degree two years later. Between 1954 and 1956 he studied theology at Wycliffe College, University of Toronto, where he was a tutor in Greek. At Wycliffe he won prizes in homiletics and Greek and was the senior student and valedictorian in his graduating year. He returned to Oxford in 1962 and 1963 for his postgraduate studies where he read the Church Fathers.

== Career ==
=== Priesthood ===
Harpur was ordained a priest in the Anglican Church of Canada in 1956. He served as a curate at St. John's York Mills, North York from 1956 to 1957. From 1957 to 1964 he served the parish of St. Margaret's-in-the-Pines in Scarborough, Ontario. During this time he lectured on ancient philosophy part-time at Wycliffe College. From 1962 to 1963 he spent a further year at Oriel College, Oxford, doing postgraduate research in Patristics and New Testament studies.

=== Academia ===
From 1964 to 1971, Harpur was an assistant professor and then a full professor of New Testament and New Testament Greek at Wycliffe, and from 1984 to 1987 he was part-time lecturer on the Theology and Praxis of Mass Media course at the Toronto School of Theology in the University of Toronto.

=== Journalism ===
Harpur worked as a journalist at the Toronto Star for thirty years, twelve of which were as the newspaper's religion editor. He met his wife Susan at the Star, where she worked in the legal department, and married her in 1980. After leaving the position of religion editor in 1984 he continued to contribute a regular column on religious and ethical issues. Harpur also wrote a number of books on religion and theology, ten of which became Canadian bestsellers and two of which were made into TV series for VisionTV. For a time he had his own radio show, Harpur's Heaven and Hell, and has hosted a variety of radio and television programs on the topic of religion, particularly on VisionTV. He was, over the years, a frequent commentator on religious news events for most of the Canadian networks, especially CBC. In his later years, Harpur also wrote occasional opinion pieces Postmedia Network and a column for Sun Media. In 1996, his bestseller Life After Death about near-death experiences was turned into a ten-episode TV series hosted by Harpur himself. Harpur's 2004 book The Pagan Christ was named the Canadian non-fiction bestseller of the year by the Toronto Star and The Globe and Mail.

=== Fellowships and awards ===
Harpur was a Fellow of the American Religious Public Relations Council, and in 1976 won a State of Israel Silver Medal for Outstanding Journalism. His biography is included in the American Who's Who in Religion, Canadian Who's Who, and Men of Achievement. In 2008 the CBC documentary The Pagan Christ, based upon Harpur's book, won the Platinum Remi Award at the Houston International Film Festival and the Gold Camera Award at the US International Film and Video Festival in Redondo Beach, California. He belonged to the Canadian Association of Rhodes Scholars and the Writers' Union.

=== The Pagan Christ ===
Harpur's 2004 book The Pagan Christ presents the case that the gospels rework ancient pagan myths. Harpur builds on Alvin Boyd Kuhn when listing similarities among the stories of Jesus, Horus, Mithras, Buddha and others. According to Harpur, in the second or third centuries, the early church created the fictional impression of a literal and historic Jesus and then used forgery and violence to cover up the evidence. Having come to see the scriptures as symbolic allegory of a cosmic truth rather than as inconsistent history, Harpur concludes he has a greater internal connection with the spirit of Christ.

The book received a great deal of criticism, including a response book, Unmasking the Pagan Christ: An Evangelical Response to the Cosmic Christ Idea. Robert M. Price's negative review of The Pagan Christ notes,

Harpur grants that the gospel mythemes descend only indirectly from Egyptian prototypes, through the channels of Greco-Roman Mystery cults and even the Old Testament, most of the time his citation of Egyptian stories and iconography, a la Massey, et al., implies a direct borrowing from Egypt ... I am friendly to this position up to a point. ... But he appeals to many, many more bits of Egyptian myth and liturgy, and most of these do not strike me with anywhere near the force that they did Harpur.

Harpur published a more scholarly sequel called Water into Wine in 2007.

== Death ==
Harpur died in Lion's Head, Ontario, on January 2, 2017, at age 87.

== Bibliography ==
- Harpur's Heaven and Hell. Oxford, 1983. ISBN 0-7710-3941-7
- For Christ's Sake. Oxford, 1986. ISBN 0-19-540533-1
- Always on Sunday. Oxford, OUP. 1988 0195406508
- Prayer Journal Kelowna. B.C. Northstone.
- Prayer - The Hidden Fire Kelowna, B. C. Northstone.1997 ISBN 1-896836-32-1
- Would You Believe McClelland and Stewart. (US title: The Thinking Person’s Guide to God, Prima, 1996
- Harpur vs. Hancock Hantsport, N. S. Lancelot, 1994. ISBN 0-88999-584-2
- The Divine Lover (Lancelot)
- The God Question (Lancelot)
- Life After Death McClelland and Stewart. 1991. ISBN 0-7710-3941-7
- God help us Toronto : McClelland & Stewart, 1992 ISBN 0-7710-3943-3
- Communicating the Good News Today (Lancelot)
- The uncommon touch : an investigation of spiritual healing. Toronto : McClelland & Stewart, c1994. ISBN 0-7710-3944-1
- Harpur vs. Hancock (Tom Harpur, Maxine Hancock). Hantsport, N.S. Lancelot Press, 1994. ISBN 0-88999-584-2
- The thinking person's guide to God : overcoming the obstacles to belief. Rocklin, Calif. : Prima Pub., 1996. ISBN 0-7615-0707-8
- The Spirituality of Wine (Northstone)2004
- The Pagan Christ: Recovering the Lost Light. Toronto.Thomas Allen, 2004. ISBN 0-88762-145-7
- Finding the Still Point - A Spiritual Response to Stress Kelowna. B.C. Northstone, 2005 1896836712
- Living Waters (Thomas Allen, 2006) ISBN 0-88762-225-9, 2006
- Water Into Wine: An Empowering Vision of the Gospels. Thomas Allen, 2007 ISBN 0-88762-277-1
- Born Again: My Journey from Fundamentalism to Freedom. Thomas Allen, 2011 ISBN 9780887627385
- There is Life after Death. (Updated and revised version of Life After Death, 1991) Thomas Allen, 2011 ISBN 9780887627408

Children's books

- The Terrible Finn MacCoul Oxford, OUP, 1990. 0195407164.
- The Mouse that Couldn't Squeak (Oxford)
