= Did Jesus Exist? =

Did Jesus Exist? may refer to:

- Did Jesus Exist? (Ehrman book), 2012 book by formerly Christian, now agnostic New Testament scholar Bart Ehrman
- Did Jesus Exist? (Wells book), 1975 book by modern German historian George Albert Wells

== See also ==
- Christ myth theory, a hypothesis that Jesus never existed
