= Jesus and history =

Jesus and history may refer to:

- Jesus
- Historicity of Jesus, the existence of Jesus as a historical figure
- Historical Jesus, the reconstruction of portraits of Jesus' life and teachings using historical methods
- Chronology of Jesus, the chronology of the major events of Jesus' life
- Quest for the historical Jesus, the methods and techniques used by academics to study the life of Jesus
- Historical background of the New Testament, the cultural influences that form the backdrop of Jesus' life in 1st century Judea
- Historical reliability of the Gospels, the historical validity or invalidity of the canonical gospels
- Genealogy of Jesus, study of Jesus' lineage
- Christ myth theory, the theory that Jesus was a fictional or mythological character invented by early Christians

== Related topics ==
- Historicity of the Bible
- Jesus in comparative mythology, compares the narrative of the life of Jesus from the Christian gospels with other religions
- Josephus on Jesus, the references by 1st-century Jewish historian Josephus to Jesus in his Antiquities of the Jews
- Tacitus on Jesus, the reference by Tacitus in Book 15 of his Annals to Christians and the execution of their leader by Pontius Pilate
- Criticism of Jesus, criticisms of Jesus that have been raised by various scholars and writers

== See also ==
- History of early Christianity
