= G. A. Wells =

British professor of German and rationalist (1926–2017)

- Born: George Albert Wells; 22 May 1926; London, England
- Died: 23 January 2017 (aged 90)
- Occupations: Professor of German, London University
- Known for: Atheism and rationalism

Academic background
- Education: University of London, Bern University
- Influences: Bruno Bauer, Paul-Louis Couchoud, Arthur Drews, Ludwig Feuerbach, Albert Kalthoff, Albert Schweitzer, William Benjamin Smith, David Strauss, William Wrede

Academic work
- Sub-discipline: Historical criticism
- Main interests: Non-historicity of Jesus, origins of Christianity
- Notable works: The Jesus of the Early Christians, Did Jesus Exist?, The Historical Evidence for Jesus, Who Was Jesus?, Belief & Make-Believe, The Jesus Legend, The Jesus Myth, Can We Trust the New Testament?, Cutting Jesus Down to Size
- Notable ideas: Jesus is a composite from two sources: Hebrew wisdom and Galilean miracle-worker/cynic-sage preacher
- Influenced: Earl Doherty, Alvar Ellegård, R. Joseph Hoffmann, Michael Martin

George Albert Wells (22 May 1926 – 23 January 2017) was an English scholar who served as Professor of German at Birkbeck, University of London. After writing books about famous European intellectuals, such as Johann Gottfried Herder and Franz Grillparzer, he turned to the study of the historicity of Jesus, starting with his book The Jesus of the Early Christians in 1971. He is best known as an advocate of the thesis that Jesus is essentially a mythical rather than a historical figure, a theory that was pioneered by German biblical scholars such as Bruno Bauer and Arthur Drews.

From the late 1990s, Wells said that the hypothetical Q document, which is proposed as a source used in some of the gospels, may "contain a core of reminiscences" of an itinerant Galilean miracle-worker/Cynic-sage type preacher. This new stance has been interpreted as Wells changing his position to accept the existence of a historical Jesus. In 2003, Wells stated that he disagreed with Robert M. Price on the information about Jesus being "all mythical". Wells believed that the Jesus of the gospels is obtained by attributing the supernatural traits of the Pauline epistles to the human preacher of Q. In 2012, Wells reaffirmed that he agreed that Jesus existed and acknowledged he had changed his stance.

Wells was Chairman of the Rationalist Press Association. He was married and lived in St. Albans, near London. He studied at the University of London and Bern, and held degrees in German, philosophy, and natural science. Wells taught German at London University from 1949, and was Professor of German at Birkbeck College from 1968.

== Work on early Christianity ==
Wells's fundamental observation is to suggest that the earliest extant Christian documents from the first century, most notably the New Testament epistles by Paul and some other writers, show no familiarity with the gospel figure of Jesus as a preacher and miracle-worker who lived and died in the recent decades. Rather, the early Christian epistles present him "as a basically supernatural personage only obscurely on Earth as a man at some unspecified period in the past". Wells believed that the Jesus of these earliest Christians was not based on a historical character, but a pure myth, derived from mystical speculations based on the Jewish Wisdom figure.

In his early trilogy (1971, 1975, 1982), Wells argued that the gospel Jesus is an entirely mythical expansion of a Jewish Wisdom figure—the Jesus of the early epistles—who lived in some past, unspecified time period. In addition, Wells wrote, the texts are exclusively Christian and theologically motivated, and therefore a rational person should believe the gospels only if they are independently confirmed.

In his later trilogy from the mid-1990s; The Jesus Legend (1996), The Jesus Myth (1999), and Can We Trust the New Testament? (2004), Wells modified and expanded his initial thesis to include a historical Galilean preacher from the Q source:

I propose here that the disparity between the early [New Testament] documents and the [later] gospels is explicable if the Jesus of the former is not the same person as the Jesus of the latter. Some elements in the ministry of the gospel Jesus are arguably traceable to the activity of a Galilean preacher of the early first century, who figures in what is known as Q (an abbreviation for Quelle, German for ‘source’). Q supplied the gospels of Matthew and Luke with much of their material concerning Jesus’s Galilean preaching. [...] In my first books on Jesus, I argued that the gospel Jesus is an entirely mythical expansion of the Jesus of the early epistles. The summary of the argument of the Jesus Legend (1996) and the Jesus Myth (1999) given in this section of the present work makes it clear that I no longer maintain this position. The weakness of my earlier position was pressed upon me by J.D.G. Dunn, who objected that we really cannot plausibly assume that such a complex of traditions as we have in the gospels and their sources could have developed within such a short time from the early epistles without a historical basis (Dunn, [The Evidence for Jesus] 1985, p. 29). My present standpoint is: this complex is not all post-Pauline [there is also a historical Galilean preacher from the Q source] (Q, or at any rate parts of it, may well be as early as ca. A.D. 50); and if I am right, against Doherty and Price - it is not all mythical. The essential point, as I see it, is that the Q material, whether or not it suffices as evidence of Jesus's historicity, refers to a [human] personage who is not to be identified with the [mythical] dying and rising Christ of the early epistles. (Can We Trust the NT?, 2004, pp. 43, 49–50).

Wells clarified his position in The Jesus Legend, that "Paul sincerely believed that the evidence (not restricted to the Wisdom literature) pointed to a historical Jesus who had lived well before his own day; and I leave open the question as to whether such a person had in fact existed and lived the obscure life that Paul supposed of him. (There is no means of deciding this issue.)"

With this, Wells allowed for the possibility that the central figure of the gospel stories may partly be based on a historical character from first-century Galilee: "[T]he Galilean and the Cynic elements ... may contain a core of reminiscences of an itinerant Cynic-type Galilean preacher (who, however, is certainly not to be identified with the Jesus of the earliest Christian documents)." Sayings and memories of this preacher may have been preserved in the "Q" document that is hypothesized as the source of many "sayings" of Jesus found in both gospels of Matthew and Luke. However, Wells concluded that the reconstruction of this historical figure from the extant literature would be a hopeless task.

What we have in the gospels is surely a fusion of two originally quite independent streams of tradition, ...the Galilean preacher of the early first century who had met with rejection, and the supernatural personage of the early epistles, [the Jesus of Paul] who sojourned briefly on Earth and then, rejected, returned to heaven—have been condensed into one. The [human] preacher has been given a [mythical] salvific death and resurrection, and these have been set not in an unspecified past (as in the early epistles) but in a historical context consonant with the Galilean preaching. The fusion of the two figures will have been facilitated by the fact that both owe quite a lot of their substance in the documents—to ideas very important in the Jewish Wisdom literature. (Cutting Jesus Down to Size, 2009, p. 16)

The updated position taken by Wells was interpreted by other scholars as an "about-face", abandoning his initial thesis in favor of accepting the existence of a historical Jesus. However, Wells insisted that this figure of late first-century gospel stories is distinct from the sacrificial Christ myth of Paul's epistles and other early Christian documents, and that these two figures have different sources before being fused in Mark, writing, "if I am right, against Doherty and Price - it is not all mythical." Wells notes that he belongs in the category of those who argue that Jesus did exist, but that reports about Jesus are so unreliable that we can know little or nothing about him. Wells argues, for example, that the story of the execution of Jesus under Pilate is not an historical account, writing, "I regarded (and still do regard) [the following stories;] the virgin birth, much in the Galilean ministry, the crucifixion around A.D. 30 under Pilate, and the resurrection—as legendary". Many scholars still note Wells as a mythicist.

== Reception ==
Co-author R. Joseph Hoffmann has called Wells "the most articulate contemporary defender of the non-historicity thesis." Wells' claim of a mythical Jesus has received support from Earl Doherty, Robert M. Price and others. The classical historian R. E. Witt, reviewing The Jesus of the Early Christians in the Journal of Hellenic Studies, offered some criticisms but concluded that "Hellenists should welcome the appearance of this challenging book."

However, Wells' conclusions have been criticized by biblical scholars and ecclesiastical historians such as W. H. C. Frend and Robert E. Van Voorst. Voorst further critiques Wells work as "[Wells] advanced the non-historicity hypothesis, not for objective reasons, but for highly tendentious, anti-religious purposes." Historian David Aikman from Patrick Henry College criticizes Wells' lack of expertise and objectivity: "Wells is not a New Testament specialist at all but a professor of German and a former chairman of the Rationalist Press Association. He has written several books rejecting the historicity of Jesus, a position almost no New Testament scholar endorses, even those who are radically opposed to Christianity." Wells featured in the controversial Channel 4 television series about the historicity of Jesus, Jesus: The Evidence (LWT: 1984).

After reviewing criticisms from several authors, atheist philosopher Michael Martin said that although "Wells's thesis is controversial and not widely accepted," his "argument against the historicity of Jesus is sound".

Bart Ehrman, in his Did Jesus Exist? (Ehrman) (2012) stated: "The best-known mythicist of modern times — at least among the NT scholars who know of any mythicists at all — is George A. Wells...He has written many books and articles advocating a mythicist position, none more incisive than his 1975 book, Did Jesus Exist?. Wells is certainly one who does the hard legwork to make his case: Although an outsider to NT studies, he speaks the lingo of the field and has read deeply in its scholarship. Although most NT scholars will not (or do not) consider his work either convincing or particularly well argued." (p. 19). Wells provided an answer to these points in an article in Free Inquiry.

== Books ==
=== German intellectual history ===
Wells' major works in eighteenth- and nineteenth-century German language thought and letters are

- Herder and After: A Study in the Development of Sociology (Gravenhage, Mouton, 1959)
- The Plays of Grillparzer (Pergamon Press, 1969) ISBN 0-08-012950-1
- Goethe and the Development of Science, 1750-1900 (Sijthoff & Noordhoff, 1978) ISBN 90-286-0538-X
- The Origin of Language: Aspects of the Discussion from Condillac to Wundt. (Open Court Publishing Company, 1987) ISBN 0-8126-9029-X
- The Origin of Language (Rationalist Press Association, 1999)

=== Early Christianity ===
- The Jesus of the Early Christians, (Pemberton, 1971) ISBN 0-301-71014-7. Out of print, not republished.
- The Origins of Christianity: From the Pagan and Jewish Backgrounds, (Conway Hall Humanist Centre, London, 1973) ISBN 0-902368-05-2
- Did Jesus Exist? (Pemberton Publishing, Prometheus Books), 1st ed. 1975, ISBN 0-87975-086-3; 2d ed. 1986, ISBN 9780301860015
- The Historical Evidence for Jesus (Prometheus Books, 1982, 2d ed. 1988) ISBN 0-87975-180-0
- Religious Postures: Essays on Modern Christian Apologists and Religious Problems (Open Court, 1988) ISBN 0-8126-9070-2
- Who Was Jesus? A Critique of the New Testament Record (Open Court, 1989) ISBN 0-8126-9096-6
- Belief and Make-Believe: Critical Reflections on the Sources of Credulity (Open Court, 1991) ISBN 0-8126-9188-1
- What's in a Name? Reflections on Language, Magic and Religion (Open Court, 1993) ISBN 0-8126-9239-X
- The Jesus Legend (foreword by R. Joseph Hoffmann) (Open Court, 1996) ISBN 0-8126-9334-5
- The Jesus Myth (Open Court, 1999) ISBN 0-8126-9392-2
- The Acts of the Apostles: A Historical Record? (South Place Ethical Society, 2000) ISBN 9780902368224
- Can We Trust the New Testament?: Thoughts on the Reliability of Early Christian Testimony (Open Court, 2004) ISBN 0-8126-9567-4
- Cutting Jesus Down to Size: What Higher Criticism Has Achieved and Where It Leaves Christianity (Open Court, 2009) ISBN 0-8126-9656-5

=== Editor ===
- F.R.H. (Ronald) Englefield, Language, Its Origins and Relation to Thought (Pemberton, 1977)
- F.R.H. Englefield, The Mind at Work and Play (Prometheus, 1985)
- J. M. Robertson (1856-1933): Liberal, Rationalist and Scholar (Pemberton, 1987). More than half the book (p. 123-259) is Wells's presentation of Robertson's work: ch. 7, "The Critic of Christianity", and ch. 8, "The Philosopher"
- F.R.H. Englefield, Critique of Pure Verbiage, Essays on Abuses of Language in Literary, Religious, & Philosophical Writings (Open Court, 1990)
- Carl Loftmark, A History of the Red Dragon (Gwasg Carreg Gwalch, 1995) ISBN 9780863813177
- David Friedrich Strauss, The Old Faith and the New - Two volumes in one, with a 14-page introduction by G.A. Wells (Prometheus, 1997) [1st ed. Berlin, 1872] ISBN 978-1-57392-118-3.

== Articles and other media ==
- "The Critics of Buckle", Past and Present (1956), pp. 75–84
- "Criteria of Historicity", German Life and Letters, New Series, vol. XXII, No.4 (Oct. 1968)
- "Stages of NT Criticism", Journal of the History of Ideas, vol. XXX, No. 2 (April 1969), pp. 151–155. [Discusses the view of Volney on the origin of astrology in early agriculture and its extension to stars' influence on human affairs.]
- "The Myth of the Mushroom", Humanist, 86 (1971), pp. 49–51.
- "The Holy Shroud of Turin," Question 9 (1975), pp. 24–37.
- "Miracles and the Nature of Truth", Question 10 (1977), pp. 30–41.
- "Was Jesus Crucified Under Pontius Pilate? Did He Even Live at All?”, The Humanist, vol. XXXVIII, no. 1, January–February, 1978, pp. 22–27.
- "More on the Holy Shroud," New Humanist 94 (1978), pp. 11–15
- "Paul Valéry on the Importance of the Poet", Modern Languages 66 (1985), pp. 186–191
- "Burke on Ideas, Words, and Imagination", British Journal for Eighteenth-Century Studies, 9 (1986)
- "The Historicity of Jesus", in R. Joseph Hoffmann & Gerald A. Larue, ed. Jesus in Myth and History (1986), pp. 27–45.
- "Robertson as Critic of Christianity", in ed. G.A. Wells, J.M. Robertson, 1856-1933, Liberal, Rationalist, and Scholar (Pemberton, 1987), pp. 123–196
- "Wilhelm Wundt and Cultural Origins", Quinquereme, 11 (1988)
- "Criticism and the Quest for Analogies", New German Studies, 15 (1989)
- "The Bible With or Without Illusions?", New Humanist, 105 No. 1 (1990)
- Jesus: What Evidence?, debate between John Warwick Montgomery & G.A. Wells, London, Feb. 10, 1993 (2 CDs, Canadian Institute for Law, Theology and Public Policy)
- "German Bible Criticism & the Victorian Church", Journal for the Critical Study of Religion, Ethics and Society 2(1) (1997), pp. 55–67.
- "Don Cupitt's Religion of Language", Theology 105, (2002), pp. 201–210
- "A Critique of Schopenhauer's Metaphysic", German Life & Letters, 59 (2006) pp. 379–389. Wells relates Schopenhauer's view of the primacy of the will to Albert Schweitzer's claiming that the will is a transcendent reality at the basis of self-consciousness that provides immediate certainties — allowing us to connect with the "mighty spiritual force streaming forth from [Jesus Christ]", needing no longer to rely on the uncertain results of historical criticism concerning Jesus's message.
- "Historicity of Jesus", in Tom Flynn, The New Encyclopedia of Unbelief (Prometheus, 2007), pp. 446–451
- "Is There Independent Confirmation of What the Gospels Say of Jesus?", Free Inquiry 31 (2011), pp. 19–25.
