= Criticism of Jesus =

Secular and theological arguments against the purported divinity of Jesus

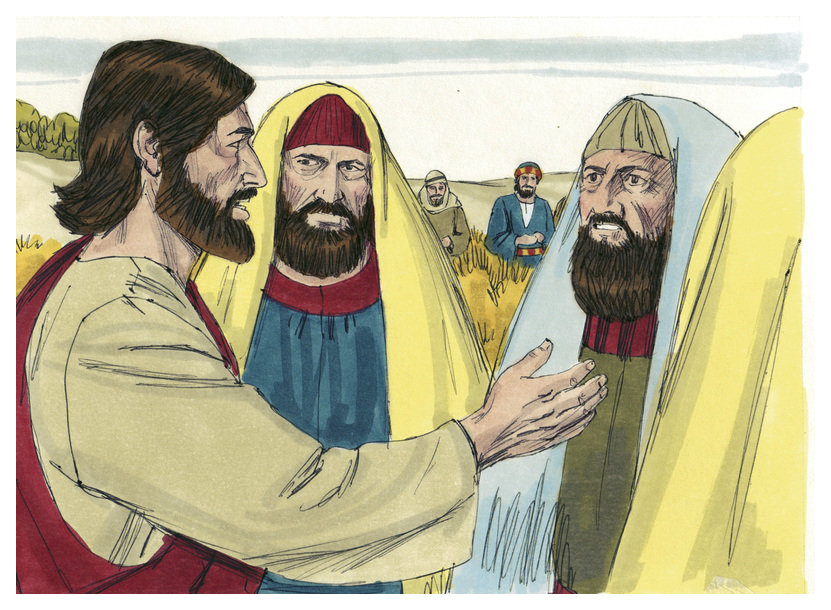
Illustration of the dispute between Jesus and the Pharisees in Mark 2

Jesus Christ, the central figure of Christianity and first-century Judean figure, has been the subject of criticism from both religious scholars and secular thinkers. Jesus has faced a variety of criticism on the basis of his actions, teachings, and legitimacy across history and in modern times. A person who makes counter-arguments to refute these criticisms is called an Apologetic.

Jesus was criticized in the first century AD by the Pharisees and scribes for disobeying certain halakhic interpretations of the Mosaic Law, for example by healing on Sabbath. He was decried in Judaism as a failed Jewish messiah claimant and a false prophet by most Jewish denominations. Judaism also considers the worship of any person a form of idolatry, and rejects the claim that Jesus was divine. Some psychiatrists, religious scholars and writers explain that Jesus' family, followers (John 7:20) and contemporaries seriously regarded him as delusional, possessed by demons, or insane.

Early critics of Christianity and Jesus included Celsus in the second century and Porphyry in the third. In the 19th century, Friedrich Nietzsche was highly critical of Jesus as described in the New Testament, whose teachings he considered to be "anti-nature" in their treatment of topics such as sexuality. More contemporary notable critics of Jesus include Ayn Rand, Hector Avalos, Sita Ram Goel, Christopher Hitchens, Bertrand Russell, and Dayananda Saraswati.

== Criticism by Jesus' contemporaries ==
=== Disobedience of Mosaic law ===
The Pharisees and scribes criticized Jesus and his disciples for not observing Mosaic Law. They criticized his disciples for not washing their hands before eating. (The religious leaders engaged in ceremonial cleansing like washing up to the elbow and baptizing the cups and plates before eating food in them—Mark 7:1–23, Matthew 15:1–20.) Jesus is also criticized for eating with the publicans (Mark 2:15). The Pharisees also criticized Jesus' disciples for gathering grain on the Sabbath (Mark 2:23–3:6).

There was some disagreement in the early church about the inclusion of Gentiles, including the status of the Mosaic covenant (called the Old Covenant by Christians) and whether Christians are still bound by it. Paul the Apostle believed that the New Covenant had superseded the old, and that Christians were no longer bound by all parts of the latter. His views, called Pauline Christianity, would become dominant in the following centuries, with most Christian denominations today believing that Jesus released his followers from the obligation to follow Mosaic Law in its entirety.

=== Claim to divine authority ===
Throughout the four canonical gospels, Jesus is characterised by his claim to divine authority as Messiah, variously either entrusting his disciples to keep this status a secret (as in Mark) or openly proclaiming (as in John) his status and his mission. Only in the Gospel of John does Jesus emphatically claim divinity, and not just divine authority, through the seven statements of "I am". In the gospel, it is this claim which leads to some of the Jews attempting to stone him, and their eventual handing Jesus over to Pilate for crucifixion on charges of blasphemy:

"We are not stoning You for any good work," said the Jews, "but for blasphemy, because You, who are a man, declare Yourself to be God."

— Gospel of John 10:33

Elsewhere in the gospels, Jesus makes multiple claims of divine authority, ability to cast out demons, authority to forgive sins, and that spiritual peace and salvation were to be found in the acceptance of his leadership. The claims caused controversy among the local Jewish community, as anyone making claims like these are false prophets per several verses in Deuteronomy.

=== Accusations of possession and madness ===
Jesus' family and contemporaries regarded him as delusional, possessed by demons, or insane.

And when his family heard it, they went out to seize him, for people were saying, "He is beside himself". And the scribes who came down from Jerusalem said, "He is possessed by Be-el′zebul, and by the prince of demons he casts out the demons".

— Mark 3:21–22, Revised Standard Version

The accusation contained in the Gospel of John is more literal:

There was again a division among the Jews because of these words. Many of them said, "He has a demon, and he is mad; why listen to him?"

— John 10:19–20, RSV

=== Miracles and exorcisms performed by magic ===
In the latter half of the first century and into the second century, Jewish and pagan opponents of Christianity argued that the miracles and exorcisms of Jesus and his followers were the result of magic, which was associated with demons and the occult.

== Later criticism ==
=== Criticism of Jesus' mental health ===
A number of writers, including David Strauss, Lemuel K. Washburn, Oskar Panizza, Lucian, and Friedrich Nietzsche, have questioned Jesus' sanity by claiming he was insane for believing he was God and/or the messiah. Psychologists and psychiatrists Georg Lomer, Charles Binet-Sanglé, William Hirsch, Georges Berguer, Y. V. Mints, Władysław Witwicki, William Sargant, Raj Persaud, and Anthony Storr, have said Jesus suffered from religious delusions and paranoia.

=== Criticism of Jesus' teachings ===
==== Slavery ====
Avery Robert Dulles held the opinion that "Jesus, though he repeatedly denounced sin as a kind of moral slavery, said not a word against slavery as a social institution", and believes that the writers of the New Testament did not oppose slavery either. In his paper published in Evangelical Quarterly, Kevin Giles notes that Jesus often encountered slavery, "but not one word of criticism did the Lord utter against slavery." Despite being a proponent of Christianity himself, Giles suggests that the lack of strong stance against slavery in the gospels could be viewed as implying that Jesus approved or was indifferent to slavery. The lack of explicit teachings against the institution of slavery in the bible has been exploited by slave owners throughout history, and passages such as Leviticus 25:44, Joshua 9:23, and Ephesians 6:5 were interpreted as slavery being a part of God's plan for society.

==== Sexuality and humility ====
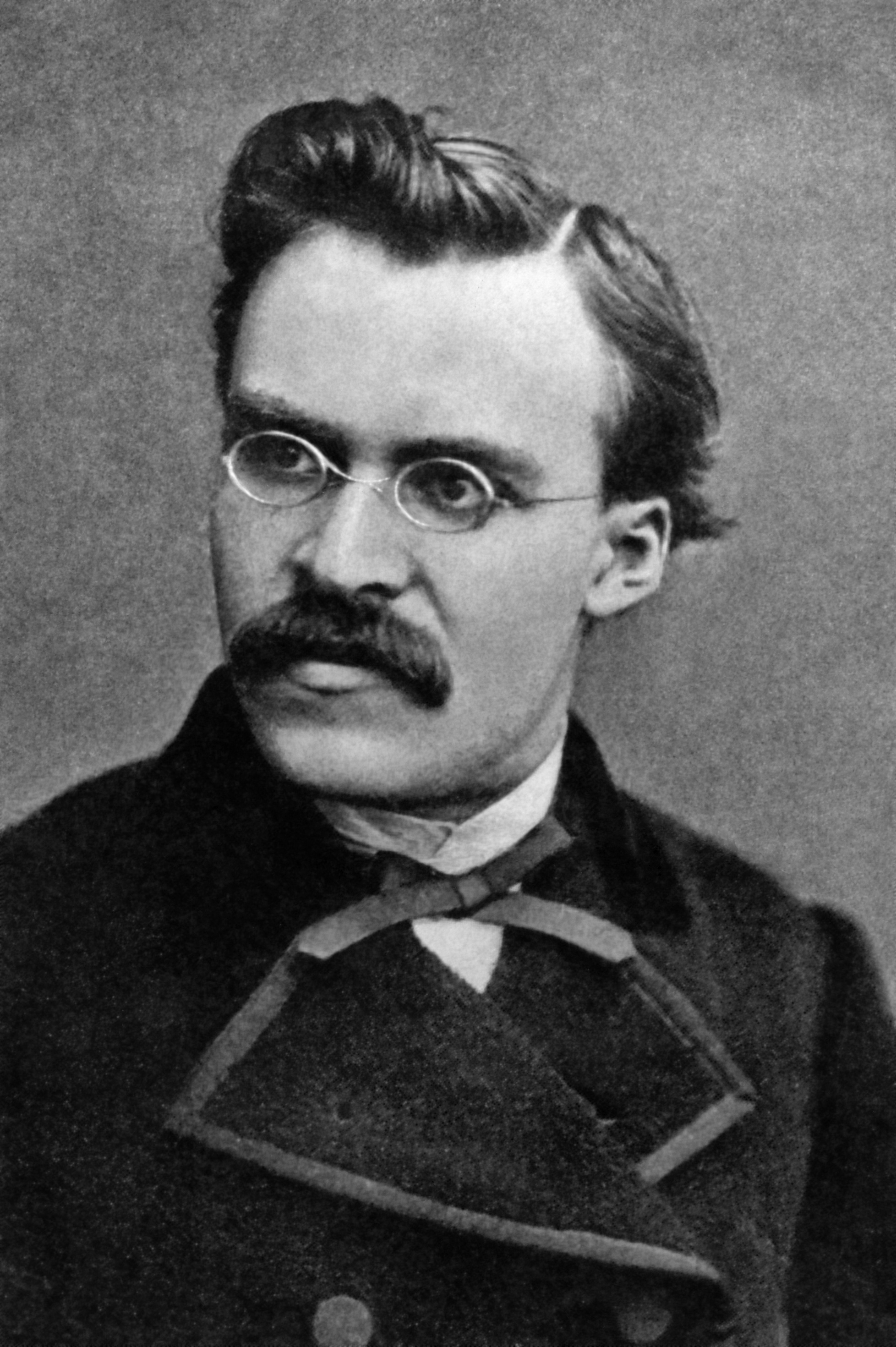
Nietzsche considered Jesus' teachings to be "unnatural".

Friedrich Nietzsche, a 19th-century philosopher, has many criticisms of the teachings of Jesus as presented in the New Testament, even going so far as to style himself as The Antichrist. In Human, All Too Human, and Twilight of the Idols for example, Nietzsche accuses the Church's and Jesus' teachings as being anti-natural in their treatment of passions, in particular sexuality: "There [In the Sermon on the Mount] it is said, for example, with particular reference to sexuality: 'If thy eye offend thee, pluck it out.' Fortunately, no Christian acts in accordance with this precept... the Christian who follows that advice and believes he has killed his sensuality is deceiving himself: it lives on in an uncanny vampire form and torments in repulsive disguises."

However, Nietzsche did make a distinction between the Biblical Jesus and the historical Jesus, which he called the "only one true Christian": he was convinced the authors of the Gospels had misrepresented his message and attributed to him teachings which were not his own. He presented a Christ whose own inner life consisted of "blessedness in peace, in gentleness, in the inability for enmity". There is much criticism by Nietzsche of the organized institution of Christianity and its class of priests. Christ's evangelism consisted of the good news that the kingdom of God is within you. "What are the 'glad tidings'? True life, eternal life is found—it is not promised, it is here, it is within you: as life lived in love.... 'Sin', every kind of distancing relationship between God and man, is abolished - precisely this is the 'glad tidings'. The 'glad tidings' are precisely that there are no more opposites...."

==== Ignorance and anger ====
Dayananda Saraswati, a 19th-century philosopher and the founder of Arya Samaj, in his book Satyarth Prakash, criticized Christianity and described Jesus as a "great thing in a country of uneducated savages":

All Christian missionaries say that Jesus was a very calm and peace-loving person. But in reality he was a hot-tempered person destitute of knowledge and who behaved like a wild savage. This shows that Jesus was neither the son of God, nor had he any miraculous powers. He did not possess the power to forgive sins. The righteous people do not stand in need of any mediator like Jesus. Jesus came to spread discord which is going on everywhere in the world. Therefore, it is evident that the hoax of Christ's being the Son of God, the knower of the past and the future, the forgiver of sin, has been set up falsely by his disciples. In reality, he was a very ordinary ignorant man, neither learned nor a yogi.

Saraswati asserted that Jesus was not an enlightened man either, and that if Jesus was a son of God, God would have saved him at the time of his death, and he would not have suffered from severe mental and physical pain at last moments.

Some authors argue that God had good reasons not to save Jesus:

If he had saved himself, he could not have saved others; the only way he could save others was precisely by not saving himself.

==== Second coming ====
Craig A. Evans writes that Jesus in Matthew appears to promise for his followers the return of the son of man was to happen before the generation he is preaching to vanishes. Some scholars see these predictions as mistaken, while many others view it from the perspective of the conditional nature of judgement prophecy.

In his 1927 essay Why I Am Not a Christian, Bertrand Russell believed that Jesus' predictions were incorrect. He thus characterized Jesus as being "not so wise as some other people have been, and he was certainly not superlatively wise". Russell also expressed doubts over the historicity of Jesus, and saw the organized Christian religion as being against moral progress.

==== Proscribing virtue and prohibiting vice ====
Novelist and philosopher Ayn Rand denounced the altruist recipe that Jesus passed down to his pupils, and with it the idea of vicarious redemption. She thought that even Christians, who think of Jesus in the highest possible terms, should feel outraged by the notion of sacrificing virtue to vice. Not surprisingly, her understanding of love as a consequence of the rational mind looking after embodied values considers the ideas Jesus is most famous for as immoral. Consider the following excerpt from a 1959 interview conducted by Mike Wallace:

Wallace: Christ, every important moral leader in man's history, has taught us that we should love one another. Why then is this kind of love in your mind immoral?
Rand: It is immoral if it is a love placed above oneself. It is more than immoral, it's impossible. Because when you are asked to love everybody indiscriminately. That is to love people without any standard. To love them regardless of whether they have any value or virtue, you are asked to love nobody.

Notwithstanding disagreements over the value of faith and the existence of an afterlife, Rand saw Jesus' insistence on procuring the eternal happiness of individuals as confirmation of the moral confusion and inconsistency in which much of religious ethics operates, including Christian altruism.

In For the New Intellectual, Rand further derides the Christian doctrine of original sin for its conspicuous immorality. "The evils for which they damn him [man] are reason, morality, creativeness, joy—all the cardinal values of his existence. It is not his vices that their myth of man's fall is designed to explain and condemn. They call it a morality of mercy and a doctrine of love for man." Rand then proceeds to charge religious leaders with fostering a death cult: "No, they say, they do not preach that man is evil, the evil is only that alien object: his body. No, they say, they do not wish to kill him, they only wish to make him lose his body."

==== Foundation of Western imperialism and the Holocaust ====
Historian and Hindutva activist Sita Ram Goel accused Jesus of being the intellectual author behind Western imperialism and the Holocaust. Goel further writes that Jesus "is no more than an artifice for legitimizing wanton imperialist aggression. He does not symbolize spiritual power or moral uprightness."

He made his case based on the gospels, which he thought cast too dark a shadow on unconverted Jews (see for instance John 8:38–47). From there he drew parallels between Jesus and Adolf Hitler, the latter of whom was, in Goel's words, the first to "completely grasp the verdict passed on the Jews by the Jesus of the gospels".

Ram Goel also ridiculed what he termed "the cult of the disentangled Christ", whereby Christians engage in historical revisionism by distancing Jesus from the atrocities his teachings inspired throughout history. An example being the portrayal of missionary proselytism and Western expansionism as separate events, coincidences, or unrelated ideas.

==== Eternal punishment of hell ====
The famous American humorist Mark Twain would write in his long suppressed Letters from the Earth:

Now here is a curious thing. It is believed by everybody that while [God] was in heaven he was stern, hard, resentful, jealous, and cruel; but that when he came down to earth and assumed the name Jesus Christ, he became the opposite of what he was before: that is to say, he became sweet, and gentle, merciful, forgiving, and all harshness disappeared from his nature and a deep and yearning love for his poor human children took its place. Whereas it was as Jesus Christ that he devised hell and proclaimed it! Which is to say, that as the meek and gentle Savior he was a thousand billion times crueler than ever he was in the Old Testament—oh, incomparably more atrocious than ever he was when he was at the very worst in those old days!

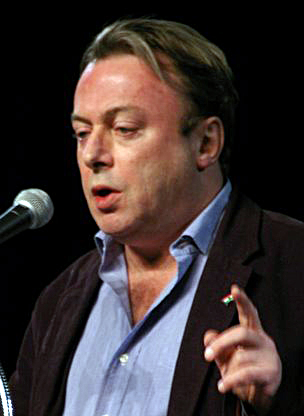
Christopher Hitchens

Author and journalist Christopher Hitchens, one of the leading exponents in the "New Atheism" movement, was extremely critical of Jesus, Christianity and any religion in general. Regarding Jesus' teachings on hell, Hitchens wrote:

The god of Moses would call for other tribes, including his favorite one, to suffer massacre and plague and even extirpation, but when the grave closed over his victims he was essentially finished with them unless he remembered to curse their succeeding progeny. Not until the advent of the Prince of Peace do we hear of the ghastly idea of further punishing and torturing the dead.

Hitchens also felt that a divine Jesus would be the more morally problematic by virtue of the problem of evil, asking:

If Jesus could heal a blind person he happened to meet, then why not heal blindness?

Though Russell believed Jesus 'had a very high degree of moral goodness', he also felt there were some notable flaws in his character. In his essay he wrote:

There is one very serious defect to my mind in Christ's moral character, and that is that He believed in hell. I do not myself feel that any person who is really profoundly humane can believe in everlasting punishment. Christ certainly as depicted in the Gospels did believe in everlasting punishment, and one does find repeatedly a vindictive fury against those people who would not listen to His preaching—an attitude which is not uncommon with preachers, but which does somewhat detract from superlative excellence. You do not, for instance find that attitude in Socrates. You find him quite bland and urbane toward the people who would not listen to him; and it is, to my mind, far more worthy of a sage to take that line than to take the line of indignation.

==== Attitude towards non-believers ====
Sam Harris, author of The End of Faith, has expressed ambivalent views on Jesus' teachings. He argues that while Jesus may have been an insightful spiritual master of compassion at times, he also taught his followers to fulfill the 'barbaric' law of the Old Testament, and gave his followers specifics on how to execute heretics. To Harris, Jesus' unresolved frustration and hatred of non-Christians runs contrary to the imagination of contemporary religious moderates, and actually lends honesty to more fundamentalist interpretations of salvation and hell. He wrote:

In addition to demanding that we fulfill every "jot" and "tittle" of Old Testament Law, Jesus seems to have suggested, in John 15:6, further refinements to the practice of killing heretics and unbelievers: "If a man abide not in me, he is cast forth as a branch, and is withered; and men gather them, and cast them into the fire, and they are burned." Whether we want to interpret Jesus metaphorically is, of course, our business. The problem with scripture, however, is that many of its possible interpretations (including most of the literal ones) can be used to justify atrocities in defense of the faith.

To the same end of exposing Jesus in relation to the doctrine of hell, Harris quotes Luke's version of the parable of the talents, which ends with the nobleman character saying:

But those mine enemies, which would not that I should reign over them, bring hither, and slay them before me.

Which is taken to be a self-portrait of Jesus and his own eschatological views.

==== Ethical teachings in light of modern ethical standards ====
Hector Avalos is perhaps the first openly atheist biblical scholar to write a systematic critique of the ethics of Jesus in his book, The Bad Jesus: The Ethics of New Testament Ethics. Koowon Kim, an associate professor in the Old Testament at Reformed Graduate University in South Korea remarks in his review of The Bad Jesus: "Whether or not one agrees with the author's conclusions, this book is the first systematic challenge to New Testament ethics by an atheist scholar firmly grounded in the Hebrew Bible and its ancient Near Eastern context and well-versed in New Testament and Early Christianity."

In a review in Biblical Theology Bulletin, Sarah Rollens, a New Testament scholar at Rhodes College, remarks: "Hector Avalos aims not only to convince us that many portrayals of Jesus based on New Testament texts are morally or ethically problematic, but also to demonstrate how scholars have engaged in questionable distortions to minimize, explain away, or otherwise ignore any textual evidence that might not comport with modern ethical standards."

=== Criticism of Jesus' life ===
==== Historicity ====
While most scholars agree that the baptism of Jesus and the crucifixion of Jesus really happened, they do not agree on the historical reliability of the Gospels. David Strauss said Jesus' miracles were myths. Johannes Weiss and William Wrede both said that Jesus' Messianic Secret was a Christian invention. Albert Kalthoff believed Jesus' claims to divinity and his humble beginnings were two different accounts. Arthur Drews said Jesus did not exist at all, but was simply a myth invented by a cult.

==== Incarnation ====
The Neoplatonist philosopher Porphyry of Tyre (c. 232–c. 304) authored the 15 volume treatise Against the Christians, proscribed by the Emperors Constantine and Theodosius II, of which only fragments now survive and were collected by Adolf von Harnack. Selected fragments were published in English translation by J. Stevenson in 1957, of which the following is one example:

Even supposing some Greeks are so foolish as to think that the gods dwell in the statues, even that would be a much purer concept (of religion) than to admit that the Divine Power should descend into the womb of the Virgin Mary, that it became an embryo, and after birth was wrapped in rags, soiled with blood and bile, and even worse.

==== Gospel accounts of Jesus' life ====
Celsus, 2nd-century Greek philosopher and opponent of Early Christianity, mounts a wide criticism against Jesus as the founder of the Christian faith. He discounts or disparages Jesus' ancestry, conception, birth, childhood, ministry, death, resurrection, and continuing influence. According to Celsus, Jesus' ancestors came from a Jewish village. His mother was a poor country girl who earned her living by spinning cloth. He worked his miracles by sorcery and was a small, homely man. This Rabbi Jesus kept all Jewish customs, including sacrifice at the Temple in Jerusalem. He gathered only a few followers and taught them his worst habits, including begging for money. These disciples, amounting to "ten boatmen and a couple of tax collectors" were not respectable. The reports of his resurrection came from a hysterical female, and belief in the resurrection was the result of Jesus' sorcery and the crazed thinking of his followers, all for the purpose of impressing others and increasing the chance for others to become beggars.

According to Celsus, Jesus was the inspiration for skulking rebels who deserve persecution.

Celsus stated that Jesus was the bastard child of the Roman soldier Panthera or Pantera. These charges of illegitimacy are the earliest datable statement of the Jewish charge that Jesus was conceived as the result of adultery (see Jesus in the Talmud) and that his true father was a Roman soldier named Panthera. Panthera was a common name among Roman soldiers of that period. The name has some similarity to the Greek adjective parthenos, meaning "virgin". The tomb of a Roman soldier named Tiberius Julius Abdes Pantera, found in Bingerbrück, Germany, is taken by some scholars to refer to the Pantera named by Celsus.

According to Celsus, Jesus had no standing in the Hebrew Bible prophecies and talk of his resurrection was foolishness.

==== Criticism in Judaism ====
Judaism, which includes Orthodox Judaism, Haredi Judaism, Hasidic Judaism, Reform Judaism, Conservative Judaism, Reconstructionist Judaism, Karaite Judaism, and Samaritan Judaism, entirely rejects the idea of Jesus being a god, a person of a Trinity, or a mediator to God who has a special relationship with Him that somehow makes Jesus "divine". Moreover, it is Avodah Zarah ("foreign worship", which means idolatry) to regard or worship a human being as God; in Judaism, as well as in Islam, God is only One, totally transcendent, and cannot be human (Exodus 20:1–19, Deuteronomy 6:4–9, 11:13–32).

Judaism also holds that Jesus could not be the Jewish Messiah, arguing that he had not fulfilled any of the Messianic prophecies foretold in the Tanakh, nor did he embody the personal qualifications of the Messiah foretold by the Prophets. According to Jewish tradition, there were no more prophets after Malachi, who lived centuries before Jesus and delivered his prophecies about 420 BCE. Thus Judaism is critical of Jesus' own claims and allusions about his alleged messiahship and his identification as the "son of God", as presented in the New Testament, and considers Jesus to be just one of many individuals who claimed to be the Messiah, but did not fulfill any of the Messianic prophecies; therefore, they were all impostors.

The Mishneh Torah, one of the most authoritative works of Jewish law, written by Moses Maimonides, provides the last established consensus view of the Jewish community, in Hilkhot Melakhim 11:10–12 that Jesus is a "stumbling block" who makes "the majority of the world err to serve a divinity besides God".

Even Jesus the Nazarene who imagined that he would be Messiah and was killed by the court, was already prophesied by Daniel. So that it was said, "And the members of the outlaws of your nation would be carried to make a (prophetic) vision stand. And they stumbled." Because, is there a greater stumbling-block than this one? So that all of the prophets spoke that the Messiah redeems Israel, and saves them, and gathers their banished ones, and strengthens their commandments. And this one caused (nations) to destroy Israel by sword, and to scatter their remnant, and to humiliate them, and to exchange the Torah, and to make the majority of the world err to serve a divinity besides God. However, the thoughts of the Creator of the world—there is no force in a human to attain them because our ways are not God's ways, and our thoughts not God's thoughts. And all these things of Jesus the Nazarene, and of (Muhammad) the Ishmaelite who stood after him—there is no (purpose) but to straighten out the way for the King Messiah, and to restore all the world to serve God together. So that it is said, "Because then I will turn toward the nations (giving them) a clear lip, to call all of them in the name of God and to serve God (shoulder to shoulder as) one shoulder." Look how all the world already becomes full of the things of the Messiah, and the things of the Torah, and the things of the commandments! And these things spread among the far islands and among the many nations uncircumcised of heart.

== See also ==
- Christian terrorism
- Christianity and violence
- History of Christian thought on persecution and tolerance
- Criticism of the Bible
- The Bible and violence
- Criticism of Christianity
- Historical Jesus
- Historicity and origin of the Resurrection of Jesus
- Historicity of Jesus
- Historicity of the Gospels
- Jesus in Islam
- Lewis's trilemma
- Paul the Apostle and Judaism
- Problem of Hell
- Jesus in comparative mythology
- Religious perspectives on Jesus
