= Rejection of Jesus =

Historical rejection of Jesus

There are a number of episodes in the New Testament in which Jesus was rejected. Jesus is rejected in Judaism as a failed Jewish messiah claimant and a false prophet by most denominations of Judaism.

== New Testament ==
=== Hometown rejection ===
In the sixth chapter of the Gospel of Mark there is an account of a visit by Jesus to his hometown together with his followers. On the Sabbath, he enters a synagogue and begins to teach. The account says that many who heard him were "astounded", and offended, and they asked him "is this not the carpenter, the son of Mary?" It adds that he could do no "deeds of power there" except to heal a few sick people. Amazed at the community's lack of belief in him, Jesus observes that "Prophets are not without honour, except in their hometown, and among their own kin, and in their own house." (Mark 6:1-6)

As ancient biographies could display flexibility when reporting events, the account in the Gospel of Matthew differs by having those in the synagogue describe Jesus as the "son of the carpenter" and stating that he could not do many deeds of power (rather than none). (Matthew 13:54-58)

The Gospel of Luke moves this story to the beginning of Jesus' preaching in Galilee; ancient writing involved chronological displacement, with even reliable biographers like Plutarch displaying them. According to Lutheran commentator Mark Allan Powell, this was done in order to introduce what follows it. In this version, Jesus is described as performing a public reading of scripture; he claims to be the fulfillment of a prophecy at Isaiah 61:1–2. (Luke 4:16-30)

In Matthew and Mark the crowd is also described as referring to Jesus as being the brother of James, Simon, Joseph, and Judas (in Mark they also mention, but do not name, Jesus's sisters) in a manner suggesting that the crowd regards them as just ordinary people, and criticising Jesus' quite different behaviour.

Luke adds that Jesus recounted stories about how, during the time of Elijah, only a Sidonian woman was saved, and how, during the time of Elisha, though there were many lepers in Israel, only a Syrian was cleansed. This, according to Luke, caused the people to attack Jesus and chase him to the top of a hill in order to try to throw Jesus off, though Jesus slips away. Some scholars conclude that the historical accuracy of Luke's version is questionable, in this particular case citing that there is no cliff face in Nazareth. There are, however, several sharp precipices in close vicinity. One in particular, Mount Precipice, is often marked as the place in folk tradition.

The negative view of Jesus' family may be related to the conflict between Paul the Apostle and Jewish Christians. Critical biographer A. N. Wilson suggests that the negative relationship between Jesus and his family was placed in the Gospels (especially in the Gospel of Mark, for example, Mark 3:20–21, Mark 3:31–35) to dissuade early Christians from following the Jesus cult that was administered by Jesus' family: "... it would not be surprising if other parts of the church, particularly the Gentiles, liked telling stories about Jesus as a man who had no sympathy or support from his family." Jeffrey Bütz is more succinct: "... by the time Mark was writing in the late 60s, the Gentile churches outside of Israel were beginning to resent the authority wielded by Jerusalem where James and the apostles were leaders, thus providing the motive for Mark's antifamily stance ..." (p. 44). Other prominent scholars agree (e.g., Crosson, 1973; Mack, 1988; Painter, 1999).

=== Rejection of the cornerstone ===
Matthew 21:42, Acts 4:11 and Mark 12:10 speak of Jesus as the cornerstone which the builders (or "husbandmen") rejected. 1 Peter 2:7 discusses this rejection of Jesus. This references similar wording in Psalm 118:22: The stone which the builders rejected has become the chief cornerstone.

=== Chorazin, Bethsaida, Capernaum, and Decapolis ===
According to the Gospels of Matthew and Luke, the Galilean cities of Chorazin, Bethsaida, Capernaum, and the Decapolis did not repent in response to Jesus's teaching, so Jesus declared that the wicked cities of Tyre, Sidon, Sodom and Gomorrah would have repented; it will be more bearable for the latter cities on the Judgement Day, and Capernaum, in particular, will sink down to Hades (Matthew 11:23, Luke 10:13–15).

=== Not welcomed in a Samaritan village ===
According to Luke 9:51–56, when Jesus entered a Samaritan village, he was not welcomed, because he was going on to Jerusalem. (There was enmity between the Jews and their temple in Jerusalem and Samaritans and their temple on Mount Gerizim). Jesus' disciples James and his brother John wanted to call down fire from heaven on the village but Jesus reprimanded them and they continued on to another village.

=== Many disciples leave ===
John 6:60–6:66 records "many disciples" leaving Jesus after he said that those who eat his body and drink his blood will remain in him and have eternal life (John 6:48–59). In John 6:67–71 Jesus asks the Twelve Apostles if they also want to leave, but Peter responds that they have become believers.

== Rejection as the Jewish messiah ==
Jesus is rejected in Judaism as a failed Jewish messiah claimant and a false prophet by all mainstream Jewish denominations. Judaism also considers the worship of any person a form of idolatry, and rejects the claim that Jesus was divine. However, Messianic Jewish organisations, which are not considered Jewish by any mainstream Jewish denomination, like Jews for Jesus have made the case that he is the Messiah promised by the Torah and the Prophets.

- Judaism affirms that Jesus did not fulfill the messianic prophecies by ushering in an era of universal peace (Isaiah 2:4), building the Third Temple (Ezekiel 37:26–28), and gathering all Jews back to the Land of Israel (Isaiah 43:5–6).
- Judaism deems the worship of any person a form of idolatry, rejecting the claims that Jesus was divine, an intermediary to God, or part of a Trinity.
- Jews believe the Messiah will be a direct (blood) descendant of King David through Solomon on his father's side and will be born naturally to a husband and wife (Genesis 49:10, Isaiah 11:1, Jeremiah 23:5, 33:17; Ezekiel 34:23–24).
- "The point is this: that the whole Christology of the Church - the whole complex of doctrines about the Son of God who died on the Cross to save humanity from sin and death - is incompatible with Judaism, and indeed in discontinuity with the Hebraism that preceded it."
- "Aside from its belief in Jesus as the Messiah, Christianity has altered many of the most fundamental concepts of Judaism." (Kaplan, Aryeh)
- "...the doctrine of Christ was and will remain alien to Jewish religious thought."
- "For two thousand years, Jews rejected the claim that Jesus fulfilled the messianic prophecies of the Hebrew Bible, as well as the dogmatic claims about him made by the church fathers - that he was born of a virgin, the son of God, part of a divine Trinity, and was resurrected after his death. ... For two thousand years, a central wish of Christianity was to be the object of desire by Jews, whose conversion would demonstrate their acceptance that Jesus has fulfilled their own biblical prophecies."
- "No Jew accepts Jesus as the Messiah. When someone makes that faith commitment, they become Christian. It is not possible for someone to be both Christian and Jewish."

On the Jewish side, the accounts of Jewish rejection of Jesus are prominently featured in the Birkat haMinim of the Amidah and the Talmud. The Talmud indicates that Rabbi Gamaliel II directed Samuel ha-Katan to write another paragraph for the central Amidah-prayer, inveighing against (early Christian) informers and heretics, which was inserted as the twelfth paragraph in modern sequence (Birkat haMinim).

On the Christian side, the accounts of Jewish rejection of Jesus are prominently featured in the New Testament, especially the Gospel of John. For example, in 7:1–9 Jesus moves around in Galilee but avoids Judea, because "the Jews/Judeans" were looking for a chance to kill him. In 10:20 many said ″he hath a devil, and is mad″. In 7:12–13 some said "he is a good man" whereas others said he deceives the people, but these were all "whispers", no one would speak publicly for "fear of the Jews/Judeans". Jewish rejection is also recorded in 7:45–52, 8:39–59, 10:22–42 and 12:36–43. 12:42 says many did believe, but they kept it private, for fear the Pharisees would exclude them from the Synagogue.

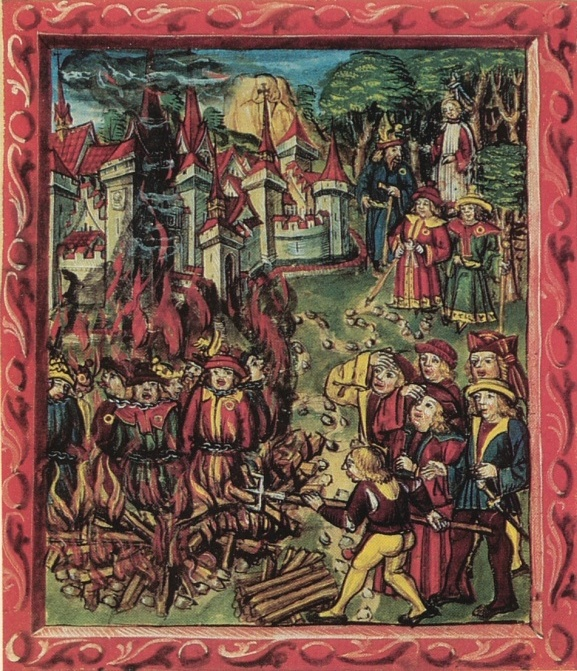
Jews (identified by yellow badges) being burned at the stake, from the Luzerner Schilling (1513)

According to Jeremy Cohen,

[e]ven before the Gospels appeared, the apostle Paul (or, more probably, one of his disciples) portrayed the Jews as Christ's killers ... But though the New Testament clearly looks to the Jews as responsible for the death of Jesus, Paul and the evangelists did not yet condemn all Jews, by the very fact of their Jewishness, as murderers of God and his messiah. That condemnation, however, was soon to come."

Emil Fackenheim wrote in 1987:

"... Except in relations with Christians, the Christ of Christianity is not a Jewish issue. There simply can be no dialogue worthy of the name unless Christians accept—nay, treasure—the fact that Jews through the two millennia of Christianity have had an agenda of their own. There can be no Jewish-Christian dialogue worthy of the name unless one Christian activity is abandoned, missions to the Jews. It must be abandoned, moreover, not as a temporary strategy but in principle, as a bimillennial theological mistake. The cost of that mistake in Christian love and Jewish blood one hesitates to contemplate."

== Commentary from the Church Fathers ==
Jerome: "After the parables which the Lord spake to the people, and which the Apostles only understand, He goes over into His own country that He may teach there also."

Chrysostom: "By his own country here, He means Nazareth; for it was not there but in Capharnaum that, as is said below, He wrought so many miracles; but to these He shows His doctrine, causing no less wonder than His miracles."

Saint Remigius: "He taught in their synagogues where great numbers were met, because it was for the salvation of the multitude that He came from heaven upon earth. It follows; So that they marvelled, and said, Whence hath this man this wisdom, and these many mighty works? His wisdom is referred to His doctrine, His mighty works to His miracles."

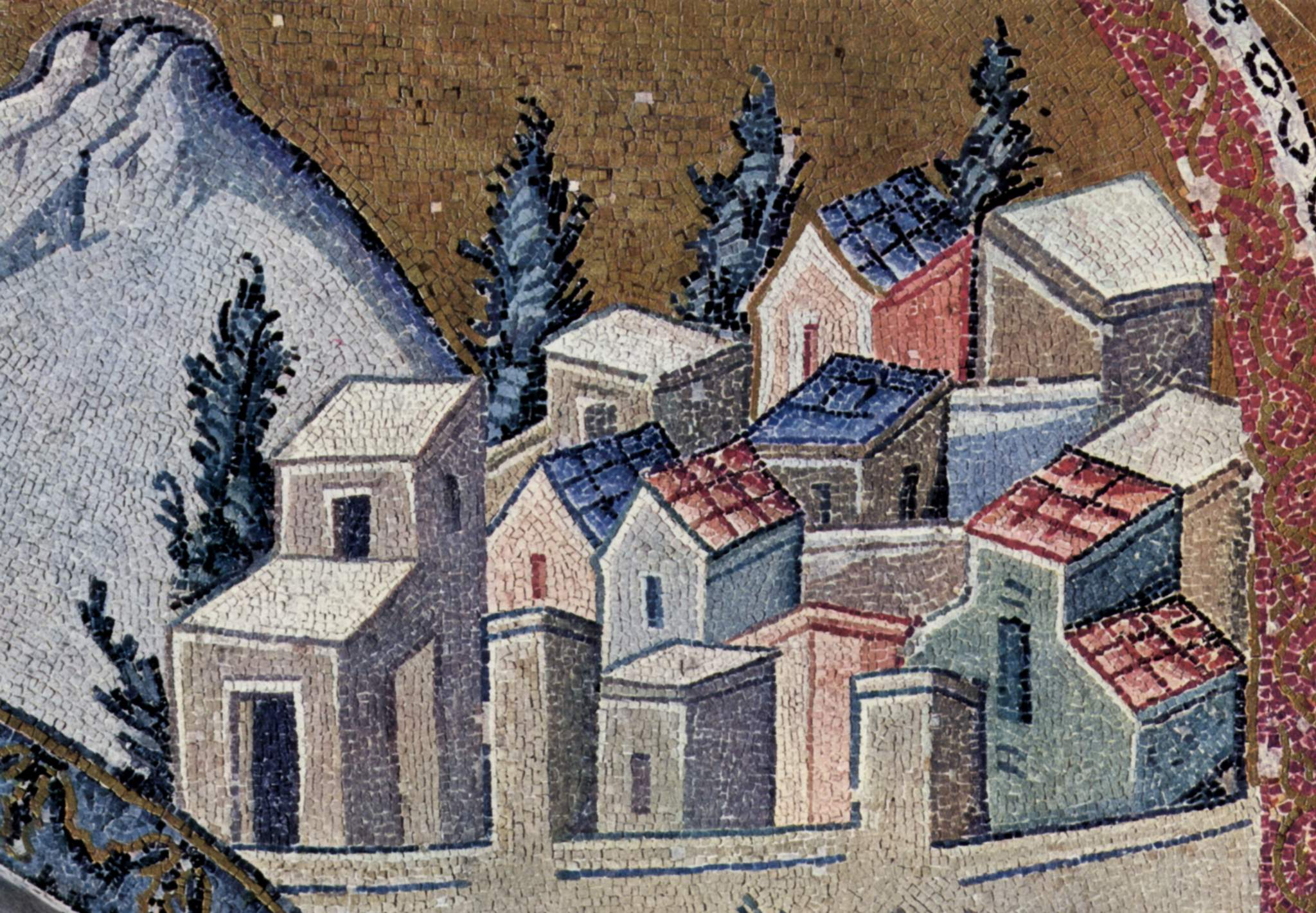
Nazareth as depicted on a Byzantine mosaic

Jerome: "Wonderful folly of the Nazarenes! They wonder whence Wisdom itself has wisdom, whence Power has mighty works! But the source of their error is at hand, because they regard Him as the Son of a carpenter; as they say, Is not this the carpenter's son?"

Chrysostom: "Therefore were they in all things insensate, seeing they lightly esteemed Him on account of him who was regarded as His father, notwithstanding the many instances in old times of sons illustrious sprung from ignoble fathers; as David was the son of a husbandman, Jesse; Amos the son of a shepherd, himself a shepherd. And they ought to have given Him more abundant honour, because, that coming of such parents, He spake after such manner; clearly showing that it came not of human industry, but of divine grace."

Pseudo-Augustine: " For the Father of Christ is that Divine Workman who made all these works of nature, who set forth Noah's ark, who ordained the tabernacle of Moses, and instituted the Ark of the covenant; that Workman who polishes the stubborn mind, and cuts down the proud thoughts."

Hilary of Poitiers: "And this was the carpenter's son who subdues iron by means of fire, who tries the virtue of this world in the judgment, and forms the rude mass to every work of human need; the figure of our bodies, for example, to the divers ministrations of the limbs, and all the actions of life eternal."

Jerome: "And when they are mistaken in His Father, no wonder if they are also mistaken in His brethren. Whence it is added, Is not his mother Mary, and his brethren, James, and Joseph, and Simon, and Judas? And his sisters, are they not all with us?"

Jerome: "Those who are here called the Lord's brethren, are the sons of a Mary, His Mother's sister; she is the mother of this James and Joseph, that is to say, Mary the wife of Cleophas, and this is the Mary who is called the mother of James the Less."

Augustine: "No wonder then that any kinsmen by the mother's side should be called the Lord's brethren, when even by their kindred to Joseph some are here called His brethren by those who thought Him the son of Joseph."

Hilary of Poitiers: "Thus the Lord is held in no honour by His own; and though the wisdom of His teaching, and the power of His working raised their admiration, yet do they not believe that He did these things in the name of the Lord, and they cast His father's trade in His teeth. Amid all the wonderful works which He did, they were moved with the contemplation of His Body, and hence they ask, Whence hath this man these things? And thus they were offended in him."

Jerome: "This error of the Jews is our salvation, and the condemnation of the heretics, for they perceived Jesus Christ to be man so far as to think Him the son of a carpenter."

Chrysostom: "Observe Christ's mercifulness; He is evil spoken of, yet He answers with mildness; Jesus said unto them, A prophet is not without honour, but in his own country, and in his own house."

Saint Remigius: "He calls Himself a Prophet, as Moses also declares, when he says, A Prophet shall God raise up unto you of your brethren. (Deut. 18:18.) And it should be known, that not Christ only, who is the Head of all the Prophets, but Jeremiah, Daniel, and the other lesser Prophets, had more honour and regard among strangers than among their own citizens."

Jerome: "For it is almost natural for citizens to be jealous towards one another; for they do not look to the present works of the man, but remember the frailties of his childhood; as if they themselves had not passed through the very same stages of age to their maturity."

Hilary of Poitiers: "Further, He makes this answer, that a Prophet is without honour in his own country, because it was in Judæa that He was to be condemned to the sentence of the cross; and forasmuch as the power of God is for the faithful alone, He here abstained from works of divine power because of their unbelief; whence it follows, And he did not there many mighty works because of their unbelief."

Jerome: "Not that because they did not believe He could not do His mighty works; but that He might not by doing them be condemning His fellow-citizens in their unbelief."

Chrysostom: "But if His miracles raised their wonder, why did He not work many? Because He looked not to display of Himself, but to what would profit others; and when that did not result, He despised what pertained only to Himself that He might not increase their punishment. Why then did He even these few miracles? That they should not say, We should have believed had any miracles been done among us."

Jerome: "Or we may understand it otherwise, that Jesus is despised in His own house and country, signifies in the Jewish people; and therefore He did among them few miracles, that they might not be altogether without excuse; but among the Gentiles He does daily greater miracles by His Apostles, not so much in healing their bodies, as in saving their souls."

== See also ==
- Anti-Christian sentiment
- Blood curse
- But to bring a sword
- Criticism of Jesus
- Jesus in the Talmud
- Life of Jesus in the New Testament
- Mandaeism
- Mental health of Jesus
- Mount Precipice
- Olivet Discourse
- Physician, heal thyself

Rejection of Jesus Life of Jesus: Ministry
Preceded by Samaritan woman at the well	First Rejection at Nazareth; Matthew 4:13-16 & Luke 4:16-31	Succeeded by Calling of Matthew
Preceded by Daughter of Jairus	Second Rejection at Nazareth; Matthew 13:54-58 & Mark 6:1-6	Succeeded by John the Baptist Beheaded
