= Ronald Englefield =

English poet and philosopher

- Born: 1891
- Died: 1975 (aged 83–84)
- Occupations: Poet, Philosopher
- Known for: Criticism of scientific materialism

Frederick Ronald Hastings Englefield (1891–1975) was an English poet and philosopher. His major work, Language and Thought, remains unpublished, though excerpts have appeared in various books and journals. He was critical of the use of words in situations where the words have no clear referent, especially in religion and philosophy, but also in literary criticism. His theory that language evolved naturally from gestures has not met with wide acceptance, but his criticism of religion and philosophy, published posthumously, was well received and is still in print.

== Biography ==
The child of a London solicitor, Englefield attended Mill Hill School in North London. He was a scholarship student at St. John's College, Cambridge, where he studied modern languages. In World War I, he served in France and in Salonika, and was mentioned by Winston Churchill for "gallant and distinguished services in the field". After the war, he supported himself by teaching French and German in public schools, and wrote poetry and philosophy. In his lifetime, his only publications were a book of poems, Songs of Defiance and, in the last years of his life, two articles, excerpts from the rejected Language and Thought, in the journal Trivium, University of Wales Press.

== Writing ==
While unsuccessful in his lifetime, he was remembered by his students, and a number of articles drawn from Language and Thought have been published in books and journals, notably "Kant as Defender of the Faith in Nineteenth-century England", "The Nature of Thinking", and "Uses and Abuses of Language". His book, Critique of Pure Verbiage, includes a critique of Kant's "Critique of Pure Reason".

== Bibliography ==
- Englefield, Ronald (as by Frederick Ronald), Songs of Defiance, Erskine Macdonald, London, 1917.
- Critique of Pure Verbiage, Essays on Abuses of Language in Literary, Religious, and Philosophical Writings, edited by G. A. Wells and D. R. Oppenheimer, Open Court Publishing Company, 1990, ISBN 0-8126-9108-3 ISBN 978-0812691085
- The Mind at Work and Play, Prometheus Books, 1985, ISBN 0-87975-254-8 ISBN 978-0879752545
