= Did Jesus Exist? (Wells book) =

1975 book by George Albert Wells

- First edition
- Author: George Albert Wells
- Publisher: Prometheus Books
- Publication date: 1975
- Media type: Hardcover/Paper
- Pages: 256 pages
- ISBN: 0-87975-395-1
- OCLC: 137341896

Did Jesus Exist? is a 1975 book written by George Albert Wells, Professor of German at Birkbeck, University of London, who speculated on the evidence of Jesus Christ. Wells argues there was no historical evidence of Jesus existing. A revised second edition was published in 1986.

Wells later modified his position, and in 2003 stated that he now disagrees with Robert M. Price on the information about Jesus being "all mythical". Wells now believes that the Jesus of the gospels is obtained by attributing the supernatural traits of the Pauline epistles to the human preacher of Q source.

== Contents ==
- Contents
- Preface
- Abbreviations for Books of the New Testament
- Introduction
  1. Jewish and Pagan Testimony to Jesus
  2. Early Christian Epistles
  3. The Origin and Nature of the Gospels
  4. Christologies
  5. The Twelve
  6. Galilee and John the Baptist
  7. Was Jesus a Political Rebel?
  8. The Pagan and Jewish Background
  9. The Debate Continues
- Conclusion
- Numbered List of References
- Index of New Testament References
- General Index

== Reception ==
Bart Ehrman, in his Did Jesus Exist? (2012) stated: "The best-known mythicist of modern times — at least among the NT scholars who know of any mythicists at all — is George A. Wells...He has written many books and articles advocating a mythicist position, none more incisive than his 1975 book, Did Jesus Exist?. Wells is certainly one who does the hard legwork to make his case: Although an outsider to NT studies, he speaks the lingo of the field and has read deeply in its scholarship. Although most NT scholars will not (or do not) consider his work either convincing or particularly well argued." (p. 19). Wells, 86, provided an answer to these points in an article in Free Inquiry.

== See also ==
- Christ myth theory
- Historicity of Jesus
- Historical Jesus
