= Earl Doherty =

Canadian historian, proponent of the Christ myth theory

- Born: 1941 (age 84–85)
- Education: B.A. in Ancient History and Classical Languages (institution and date not identified)
- Occupation: Writer
- Known for: Proponent of the Christ myth theory
- Website: jesuspuzzle.com

Earl J. Doherty (born 1941) is a Canadian author of The Jesus Puzzle (1999), Challenging the Verdict (2001), and Jesus: Neither God Nor Man (2009). Doherty argues that the historicity of Jesus is a myth, that Jesus did not exist as a historical figure. Doherty claims that Paul thought of Jesus as a spiritual being executed in a spiritual realm.

== Education ==
Doherty has stated he has a bachelor's degree in Ancient History and Classical Languages, but no completed advanced degrees. His undergraduate studies gave him knowledge of Greek and Latin, to which he has added a basic knowledge of Hebrew and Syriac.

== Writings ==
Regarding the mythical origin of Jesus, Doherty was influenced by the work of G. A. Wells, who has authored a number of books arguing a moderate form of the "Christ myth" theory. Doherty's book The Jesus Puzzle: Did Christianity Begin with a Mythical Christ? was published by Canadian Humanist Publications in 1999. His 2001 book Challenging the Verdict is a critique of The Case for Christ, an apologetic work by author Lee Strobel. Following a 2005 re-release of The Jesus Puzzle by his Age of Reason Publications imprint, he revised and expanded the book for the 2009 release Jesus: Neither God Nor Man - The Case for a Mythical Jesus. Doherty also published the 2012 book-length rebuttal The End of an Illusion: How Bart Ehrman's "Did Jesus Exist?" Has Laid the Case for an Historical Jesus to Rest.

Doherty asserts that "Christianity began with a belief in a spiritual, mythical figure, that the Gospels are essentially allegory and fiction, and that no single identifiable person named Jesus lay at the root of the Galilean preaching tradition." Doherty argues in The Jesus Puzzle (2005) and Jesus: Neither God nor Man—The Case for a Mythical Jesus (2009) that Jesus originated as a myth derived from Middle Platonism with some influence from Jewish mysticism, and that belief in a historical Jesus emerged only among Christian communities in the 2nd century.

According to Doherty, none of the major Christian apologists before 180 AD, except for Justin and Aristides of Athens, included an account of a historical Jesus in their defenses of Christianity. Instead Doherty suggests that the early Christian writers describe a Christian movement grounded in Platonic philosophy and Hellenistic Judaism, reaching the worship of a monotheistic Jewish god and what he calls a "logos-type Son". Doherty further argues that Theophilus of Antioch (c. 163–182), Athenagoras of Athens (c. 133–190), Tatian the Assyrian (c. 120–180), and Marcus Minucius Felix (writing around 150–270) offer no indication that they believed in a historical figure crucified and resurrected, and that the name Jesus does not appear in any of them.

=== The Jesus Puzzle ===
Doherty has used the title "The Jesus Puzzle" for four different works.

- In Fall 1997, the Journal of Higher Criticism published his article, "The Jesus Puzzle: Pieces in a Puzzle of Christian Origins."
- Around the same time he created a website under the same title, in which he developed the material which he was later to publish in book form. His method was to publish a fairly crude first draft, and then omit material that proved untenable, while retaining the general direction of argument. The site continued to be used for additional commentary and responses to reviews and criticisms of his work.
- Doherty's non-fiction book The Jesus Puzzle: Did Christianity Begin with a Mythical Christ? was published two years later.
- He also used the title for a novel which he provided for download on his website.

In all four of these works, Doherty presents views on the origins of Christianity, specifically promoting the view that Jesus is a mythical figure rather than a historical person. Doherty argues that Paul and other writers of the earliest existing proto-Christian Gnostic documents did not believe in Jesus as a person who incarnated on Earth in a historical setting. Rather, they believed in Jesus as a heavenly being who suffered his sacrificial death in the lower spheres of heaven at the hands of the demon spirits, and was subsequently resurrected by God. This Christ myth was not based on a tradition reaching back to a historical Jesus, but on the Old Testament exegesis in the context of Jewish-Hellenistic religious syncretism heavily influenced by Middle Platonism, and what the authors believed to be mystical visions of a risen Jesus.

Doherty says that the Jesus myth was given a historical setting only by the second generation of Christians, somewhere between the 1st and 2nd century. He further says that even the author of the Gospel of Mark probably did not consider his gospel to be a literal work of history, but an allegorical midrashic composition based on the Old Testament prophecies. In the widely supported two-source hypothesis, the story of Mark was later fused with a separate tradition of anonymous sayings embodied in the Q document into the other gospels. According to Doherty, the Q-authors may have regarded themselves as "spokespersons for the Wisdom of God," with Jesus being the embodiment of this Wisdom. In time, the gospel-narrative of this embodiment of Wisdom became interpreted as the literal history of the life of Jesus. Doherty denies any historical value of the Acts of the Apostles, and refers to works by John Knox, Joseph B. Tyson, J.C. O'Neill, Burton L. Mack and Richard Pervo in dating Acts into the 2nd century and regarding it as largely based on legend.

In 2009, Doherty self-published a revised edition of his book, with a new title of Jesus: Neither God nor Man, expanded by incorporating the rebuttals to criticisms received since 1999 and accumulated on his website.

== Reception ==
Among authors sympathetic to the view that Jesus never existed, Doherty's work has received mixed reactions. The Jesus Puzzle has received favorable reviews from fellow mythicists Robert M. Price and Richard Carrier. Frank Zindler, former editor of American Atheist, in a review of The Jesus Puzzle described it as "the most compelling argument against the historical Jesus published in my life-time".

George Albert Wells, who now argues a more moderate form of the Christ myth and who rejects Doherty's view that the mythical Jesus of Paul did not also descend to Earth, has nonetheless described The Jesus Puzzle as an "important book". R. Joseph Hoffmann considers that there are "reasons for scholars to hold" the view that Jesus never existed, but considers Doherty "A 'disciple' of Wells" who "has rehashed many of the former’s views in The Jesus Puzzle (Age of Reason Publications, 2005) which is qualitatively and academically far inferior to anything so far written on the subject". Doherty has responded that his work owes very little to Wells.

Writers who do not necessarily support the hypothesis that Jesus did not exist have found merit in some of Doherty's arguments. Hector Avalos has written that "The Jesus Puzzle outlines a plausible theory for a completely mythical Jesus."

Bart Ehrman, an expert on textual criticism of the NT and Early Christianity, has dismissed Jesus, Neither God nor Man as "filled with so many unguarded and undocumented statements and claims, and so many misstatements of fact, that it would take a 2,400-page book to deal with all the problems... Not a single early Christian source supports Doherty's claim that Paul and those before him thought of Jesus as a spiritual, not a human being, who was executed in the spiritual, not the earthly realm."

In a book criticizing the Christ myth theory, New Testament scholar Maurice Casey describes Doherty as "perhaps the most influential of all the mythicists", but one who is unable to understand the ancient texts he uses in his arguments.

== Bibliography ==
- "The Jesus Puzzle: Part One: A Conspiracy of Silence". Humanist in Canada. 114: 20–24. Autumn 1995. Archived from the original on 1 September 1999.
- "The Jesus Puzzle: Part Two: Who was Christ Jesus?". Humanist in Canada. 115: 10–14, 31. Winter 1995–1996.
- "The Jesus Puzzle: Part Three: The Evolution of Jesus of Nazareth". Humanist in Canada. 116: 24–30, 38. Spring 1996.
- "The Jesus Puzzle: Postscript". Humanist in Canada. 117: 20–23, 38. Summer 1996.
- "The Jesus Puzzle: The Second Century: What the Christian apologists of the second century present us with". Humanist in Canada. 120. Spring 1997.
- "Book Review: Burton L. Mack – Who wrote the New Testament? The making of the Christian myth". Humanist in Canada. 120: 12–13. Spring 1997. Archived from the original on 17 August 2000.
- "The Jesus Puzzle: Pieces in a Puzzle of Christian Origins". Journal of Higher Criticism. 4 (2): 68–102. Fall 1997.
- "Was There No Historical Jesus?". Internet Infidels Newsletter. April 1999.
- The Jesus Puzzle: Did Christianity Begin with a Mythical Christ? - Challenging the Existence of an Historical Jesus. Ottawa: Age of Reason Publications. 2005 [First published 1999]. ISBN 978-0-9689259-1-1. "4th print [1st print Ottawa: Canadian Humanist Publications]."
- Challenging the Verdict: A Cross-Examination of Lee Strobel's "The Case for Christ". Ottawa: Age of Reason Publications. 2001. ISBN 0-9689259-0-1.
- Jesus: Neither God Nor Man - The Case for a Mythical Jesus. Ottawa: Age of Reason Publications. 2009. ISBN 978-0-9689259-2-8. "New edition, Revised and Expanded, Originally published under the title: The Jesus Puzzle: Did Christianity Begin with a Mythical Christ? - Challenging the Existence of an Historical Jesus"
- The End of an Illusion: How Bart Ehrman's "Did Jesus Exist?" Has Laid the Case for an Historical Jesus to Rest. Ottawa: Age of Reason Publications 2012
- Doherty, Earl (2021). "A Sacrifice in Heaven: The Son in the Epistle to the Hebrews". In Loftus, John W.; Price, Robert M. (eds.). Varieties of Jesus Mythicism: Did He Even Exist?. Hypatia Press. ISBN 978-1839191589.
