= Justin Meggitt =

UK religious studies scholar

Justin James Meggitt is Professor of the Study of Religion at the Faculty of Divinity, University of Cambridge, fellow at Wolfson College and is the co-founder of the Centre for the Critical Study of Apocalyptic and Millenarian Movements (CenSAMM).

== Education and career ==
He initially studied religious studies at Newcastle University before taking a Commonwealth Scholarship to Conrad Grebel College, University of Waterloo, Ontario, where he studied for a Master of Theological studies. He later undertook a PhD at Cambridge on poverty in earliest Christianity. He held fellowships at Westminster College, Oxford, and Jesus College, Cambridge, where he was a British Academy Postdoctoral Research Fellow. He has also held fellowships at Corpus Christi and Hughes Hall. Since 1999 he has held positions at the University of Cambridge, initially at the Institute of Continuing Education and, since 2017, the Faculty of Divinity. Since 2011 he has also been a visiting researcher at the Department of Ethnology, History of Religions and Gender Studies at Stockholm University.

Justin Meggitt is also the founder and coordinator of the MPhil Pathway in Religion and Conflict at the University of Cambridge and co-founder of the Centre for the Critical Study of Apocalyptic and Millenarian Movements (CenSAMM).

== Personal life ==
He was married to Melanie Jane Wright (1970–2011), a scholar of modern Judaism and the study of religion and film.
