= Lemuel K. Washburn =

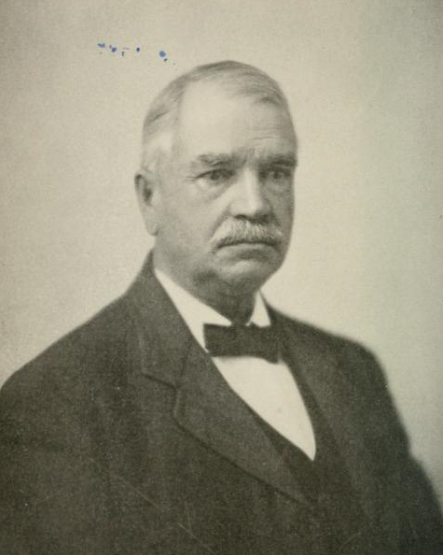
Lemuel K. Washburn

Lemuel Kelley Washburn (1846–1927) was an American Freethought writer.

He was the compiler of Cosmian Hymn Book: A Collection of Original and Selected Hymns (1888), promoted as "perfectly free from all sectarianism."

He published various atheist articles and was an editor for the Boston Investigator.

== Publications ==
- America's Debt to Thomas Paine (Boston, 1878)
- Cosmian Hymn Book (Boston, 1888)
- Is the Bible Worth Reading, and Other Essays (Truth Seeker Company, 1911)
- The Miracles of Jesus: and Other Essays (Truth Seeker Company, 1917)
