= Historicity of Jesus =

Whether Jesus was a historical figure

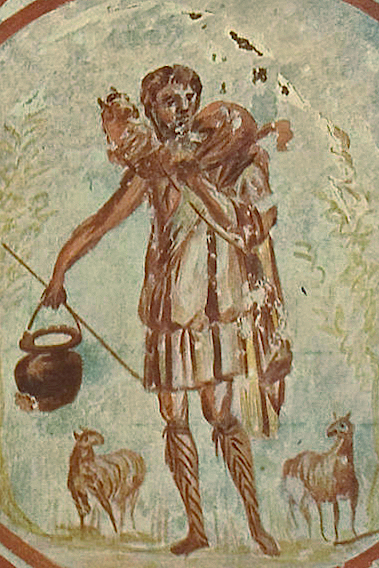
Jesus as the Good Shepherd; middle of 3rd-century.

The consensus among modern scholars is that Jesus of Nazareth existed in the Herodian Kingdom of Judea (specifically in Galilee) and the subsequent Herodian tetrarchy in the 1st century AD, upon whose life and teachings Christianity was later constructed. (Note: Jesus existed: Stanton (2002, p. 145): Today nearly all historians, whether Christians or not, accept that Jesus existed and that the gospels contain plenty of valuable evidence which has to be weighed and assessed critically. There is general agreement that, with the possible exception of Paul, we know far more about Jesus of Nazareth than about any first or second century Jewish or pagan religious teacher.; Burridge & Gould (2004, p. 34): "There's a lot of evidence for his existence."; Davies & Sanders (2008, pp. 623–625): "Historians also have at their disposal certain facts about Jesus which can be shown to be independent of the theological creativity of the early Christian movement and which provide a framework which helps interpret less certain material. We offer some of the most important facts. We know with virtually complete certainty that Jesus began his work after he was baptized by John the Baptist..We know that Jesus was executed by the Romans as 'King of the Jews'...Yet it is also a fact that Jesus' followers were not executed with him, nor were they troubled by the Romans for some decades."; Ehrman (2011, pp. 256–257): "He certainly existed, as virtually every competent scholar of antiquity, Christian or non-Christian, agrees, based on certain and clear evidence."; Ehrman (2012, pp. 4–5): "Serious historians of the early Christian movement—all of them—have spent many years preparing to be experts in their field. Just to read the ancient sources requires expertise in a range of ancient languages: Greek, Hebrew, Latin, and often Aramaic, Syriac, and Coptic, not to mention the modern languages of scholarship (for example, German and French). And that is just for starters. Expertise requires years of patiently examining ancient texts and a thorough grounding in the history and culture of Greek and Roman antiquity, the religions of the ancient Mediterranean world, both pagan and Jewish, knowledge of the history of the Christian church and the development of its social life and theology, and, well, lots of other things. It is striking that virtually everyone who has spent all the years needed to attain these qualifications is convinced that Jesus of Nazareth was a real historical figure."; Ehrman (2012, pp. 13): In agreement with the view of Albert Schweitzer: "The Jesus proclaimed by preachers and theologians today had no existence. That particular Jesus is (or those particular Jesuses are) a myth. But there was a historical Jesus, who was very much a man of his time"; Levine, Allison & Crossan (2006, pp. 4): Levine: "There is a consensus of sorts on a basic outline of Jesus' life. Most scholars agree that Jesus was baptized by John, debated with fellow Jews on how best to live according to God's will, engaged in healings and exorcisms, taught in parables, gathered male and female followers in Galilee, went to Jerusalem, and was crucified by Roman soldiers during the governorship of Pontius Pilate."; Dark (2023, pp. 149): "We can begin by asking the simple question—do we know that Jesus existed as a historical figure, rather than an invented person like James Bond or Superman? Like almost all professional archaeologists and historians who have worked on the first-century Holy Land—whatever their beliefs—I think that the answer is certainly ‘yes’."; This broad consensus is acknowledged by mythicists: Wells (2007, p. 446):"Today, most secular scholars accept Jesus as a historical, although unimpressive, figure."; Carrier (2014, pp. 2–3, 21): "The historicity of Jesus Christ is currently the default consensus.") Mainstream New Testament scholarship ignores the non-existence hypothesis and its arguments, as the question of historicity was settled in scholarship in the early 20th century. However, scholars distinguish between the 'Christ of faith' as presented in the New Testament and the subsequent Christian theology, and a minimal 'Jesus of history', about whom almost nothing can be known. (Note: Jesus of history, Christ of faith: Charlesworth (2008, pp. xix): "The term the historical Jesus denotes the life and teachings of Jesus that are reconstructed by specialists in Jesus Research. The Jesus of history is the real person of history who will always remain elusive and cannot be presented again on a reconstructed stage of history. The term the Christ of faith signifies the present and living Lord known by Christians in various church liturgies and in daily life."; Ehrman (2012, pp. 13): In agreement with the view of Albert Schweitzer: "The Jesus proclaimed by preachers and theologians today had no existence. That particular Jesus is (or those particular Jesuses are) a myth. But there was a historical Jesus, who was very much a man of his time.")

There is no scholarly consensus concerning the historicity of most elements of Jesus's life as described in the Bible, and only two key events of the biblical story of Jesus's life have been widely accepted as historical, based on the several methods, namely his baptism by John the Baptist and his crucifixion by the order of Pontius Pilate. There is also some agreement on a basic outline of his life. Furthermore, the historicity of supernatural elements like his purported miracles and resurrection are deemed to be solely a matter of 'faith' or of 'theology', or lack thereof. (Note: Miracles: Beilby & Eddy (2009, pp. 38–39): "Contrary to previous times, virtually everyone in the field today acknowledges that Jesus was considered by his contemporaries to be an exorcist and a worker of miracles. However, when it comes to historical assessment of the miracles tradition itself, the consensus quickly shatters. Some, following in the footsteps of Bultmann, embrace an explicit methodological naturalism such that the very idea of a miracle is ruled out a priori. Others defend the logical possibility of miracle at the theoretical level, but, in practice, retain a functional methodological naturalism, maintaining that we could never be in possession of the type and/or amount of evidence that would justify a historical judgment in favor of the occurrence of a miracle. Still others, suspicious that an uncompromising methodological naturalism most likely reflects an unwarranted metaphysical naturalism, find such a priori skepticism unwarranted and either remain open to, or even explicitly defend, the historicity of miracles within the Jesus tradition."; Ehrman (2001, pp. 196–197): "I should emphasize that historians do not have to deny the possibility of miracles or deny that miracles have actually happened in the past. Many historians, for example, committed Christians and observant Jews and practicing Muslims, believe that they have in fact happened. When they think or say this, however, they do so not in the capacity of the historian, but in the capacity of the believer. In the present discussion, I am not taking the position of the believer, nor am I saying that one should or should not take such a position. I am taking the position of the historian, who on the basis of a limited number of problematic sources has to determine to the best of his or her ability what the historical Jesus actually did. As a result, when reconstructing Jesus' activities, I will not be able to affirm or deny the miracles that he is reported to have done [...] This is not a problem for only one kind of historian—for atheists or agnostics or Buddhists or Roman Catholics or Baptists or Jews or Muslims; it is a problem for all historians of every stripe."; Bockmuehl (2001, p. 103): "Nevertheless, what is perhaps most surprising is the extent to which contemporary scholarly literature on the 'historical Jesus' has studiously ignored and downplayed the question of the resurrection [...] But even the more mainstream participants in the late twentieth-century 'historical Jesus' bonanza have tended to avoid the subject of the resurrection—usually on the pretext that this is solely a matter of 'faith' or of 'theology', about which no self-respecting historian could possibly have anything to say. Precisely that scholarly silence, however, renders a good many recent 'historical Jesus' studies methodologically hamstrung, and unable to deliver what they promise [...] In this respect, benign neglect ranks alongside dogmatic denial and naive credulity in guaranteeing the avoidance of historical truth.")

The Christ myth theory, developed in 19th century, is the view that Jesus is purely a mythological figure and that Christianity began with belief in such a figure. Proponents use a three-fold argument: the New Testament has no historical value, there are no non-Christian references to Jesus from the first century, and that Christianity had pagan or mythical roots. This view has a fringe status in scholarly circles and has had no support in critical studies for more than a century, with most such theories going without recognition or serious engagement. (Note: The Christ myth theory is rejected by mainstream scholarship as fringe: James D. G. Dunn (1974) Paul's understanding of the death of Jesus in Reconciliation and Hope. New Testament Essays on Atonement and Eschatology Presented to L.L. Morris on his 60th Birthday. Robert Banks, ed., Carlisle: The Paternoster Press, pp. 125–141, citing G. A. Wells (The Jesus of the Early Christians (1971)): "Perhaps we should also mention that at the other end of the spectrum Paul's apparent lack of knowledge of the historical Jesus has been made the major plank in an attempt to revive the nevertheless thoroughly dead thesis that the Jesus of the Gospels was a mythical figure." An almost identical quotation is included in Dunn, James DG (1998) The Christ and the Spirit: Collected Essays of James D.G. Dunn, Volume 1, Wm. B. Eerdmans Pub. Co., p. 191, and Sykes, S. (1991) Sacrifice and redemption: Durham essays in theology. Cambridge [England]: Cambridge University Press. pp. 35–36.; Grant (1977, p. 200) Classicist-numismatist Michael Grant stated in 1977: "To sum up, modern critical methods fail to support the Christ-myth theory. It has 'again and again been answered and annihilated by first-rank scholars'. In recent years, 'no serious scholar has ventured to postulate the non-historicity of Jesus', or at any rate very few, and they have not succeeded in disposing of the much stronger, indeed very abundant, evidence to the contrary."; Weaver (1999, pp. 71): Walter Weaver, scholar of philosophy and religion: "The denial of Jesus' historicity has never convinced any large number of people, in or out of technical circles, nor did it in the first part of the century."; Robert E. Van Voorst, New testament scholar: Van Voorst (2000, p. 16), referring to G. A. Wells: "The nonhistoricity thesis has always been controversial, and it has consistently failed to convince scholars of many disciplines and religious creeds. Moreover, it has also consistently failed to convince many who for reasons of religious skepticism might have been expected to entertain it, from Voltaire to Bertrand Russell. Biblical scholars and classical historians now regard it as effectively refuted."; Van Voorst (2003, p. 658): "debate on the existence of Jesus has been in the fringes of scholarship [...] for more than two centuries."; Van Voorst (2003, p. 660): "Among New Testament scholars and historians, the theory of Jesus' nonexistence remains effectively dead as a scholarly question."; Tuckett (2001, pp. 123–124): "[F]arfetched theories that Jesus' existence was a Christian invention are highly implausible."; Burridge & Gould (2004, p. 34): "There are those who argue that Jesus is a figment of the Church's imagination, that there never was a Jesus at all. I have to say that I do not know any respectable critical scholar who says that any more."; Wells (2007, p. 446) G. A. Wells, mythicist admitted "by around 1920 nearly all scholars had come to regard the case against Jesus's historicity as totally discredited"; Doherty 2009, pp. vii Earl Doherty, mythicist: "When The Jesus Puzzle was published in 1999, the theory that no historical Jesus ever lived was still generally regarded as fringe...for almost two centuries, it had achieved little traction among the public or in New Testament scholarship."; Price (2010, p. 200) Robert M. Price, former apologist and prominent mythicist, agrees that his perspective runs against the views of the majority of scholars to the point that they "dismiss Christ Myth theory as a discredited piece of lunatic fringe thought alongside Holocaust Denial and skepticism about the Apollo moon landings."; Johnson (2011, p. 4) Paul Johnson, a popular historian: "His life has been written more often than that of any other human being, with infinite variations of detail, employing vast resources of scholarship, and often controversially, not to say acrimoniously. Scholarship, like everything else, is subject to fashion, and it was the fashion, in the late nineteenth and early twentieth centuries, for some to deny that Jesus existed. No serious scholar holds that view now, and it is hard to see how it ever took hold, for the evidence of Jesus's existence is abundant."; Ehrman (2012, p. 20) Bart Ehrman, agnostic New Testament scholar: "It is fair to say that mythicists as a group, and as individuals, are not taken seriously by the vast majority of scholars in the fields of New Testament, early Christianity, ancient history, and theology. This is widely recognized, to their chagrin, by mythicists themselves....Not much has changed in the sixty-five years since Robertson's brief volume appeared."; Martin (2014, p. 285) Michael Martin, skeptic philosopher of religion: "Some skeptics have maintained that the best account of biblical and historical evidence is the theory that Jesus never existed; that is, that Jesus' existence is a myth (Wells 1999). Such a view is controversial and not widely held even by anti-Christian thinkers."; Casey (2014, p. 243) Maurice Casey, an irreligious Emeritus Professor of New Testament Languages and Literature at the University of Nottingham, concludes in his book Jesus: Evidence and Argument or Mythicist Myths? that "the whole idea that Jesus of Nazareth did not exist as a historical figure is verifiably false. Moreover, it has not been produced by anyone or anything with any reasonable relationship to critical scholarship. It belongs to the fantasy lives of people who used to be fundamentalist Christians. They did not believe in critical scholarship then, and they do not do so now. I cannot find any evidence that any of them have adequate professional qualifications."; Gray (2016, pp. 113–114) Patrick Gray, religious studies scholar, "Christian and non-Christian scholars alike now almost universally reject the "Christ myth" hypothesis. That Jesus did in fact walk the face of the earth in the first century is no longer seriously doubted even by those who believe that very little about his life or death can be known with any certainty. [Note 4:] Although it remains a fringe phenomenon, familiarity with the Christ myth theory has become much more widespread among the general public with the advent of the Internet."; Gullotta (2017, pp. 312, 314), historian of religion: "Given the fringe status of these theories, the vast majority have remained unnoticed and unaddressed within scholarly circles." "In short, the majority of mythicist literature is composed of wild theories, which are poorly researched, historically inaccurate, and written with a sensationalist bent for popular audiences."; Larry Hurtado (December 2, 2017), Why the "Mythical Jesus" Claim Has No Traction with Scholars: "The "mythical Jesus" view doesn't have any traction among the overwhelming number of scholars working in these fields, whether they be declared Christians, Jewish, atheists, or undeclared as to their personal stance. Advocates of the "mythical Jesus" may dismiss this statement, but it ought to count for something if, after some 250 years of critical investigation of the historical figure of Jesus and of Christian Origins, and the due consideration of "mythical Jesus" claims over the last century or more, this spectrum of scholars have judged them unpersuasive (to put it mildly)."; Hansen 2022 "The theory of a pre-Christian Jesus, while exceptionally intriguing, still has not found any decent footing in recent years. Though there have been some attempts at innovating the concept, invariably the arguments for this have relied heavily on conjectural interpretations of biblical and extrabiblical literature in an attempt to validate the hypothesis…All of these issues, and more, demonstrate that the pre-Christian Jesus hypothesis is still an unreliable thesis, and likely should be discounted as it was a century ago. The renovated theories fail to convincingly explain the evidence at hand."; Marina (2022) Marko Marina, ancient historian: states that Richard Carrier's mythicist views have not won any supporters from critical scholars or the academic community and that mythicist theory remains as fringe)

Academic efforts from multiple fields in biblical studies to determine facts of Jesus's life have been refined through an ongoing "quest for the historical Jesus", and several methods are used in evaluating the authenticity of elements of the Gospel-story. The criterion of multiple attestation is used to argue that attestation by multiple independent sources confirms his existence. There are at least fourteen independent sources for the historicity of Jesus from multiple authors within a century of the crucifixion of Jesus (Note: Ehrman (2012, pp. 83–85): "All of these written sources I have mentioned are earlier than the surviving Gospels; they all corroborate many of the key things said of Jesus in the Gospels; and most important they are all independent of one another. Let me stress the latter point. We cannot think of the early Christian Gospels as going back to a solitary source that “invented” the idea that there was a man Jesus. The view that Jesus existed is found in multiple independent sources that must have been circulating throughout various regions of the Roman Empire in the decades before the Gospels that survive were produced. Where would the solitary source that “invented” Jesus be? Within a couple of decades of the traditional date of his death, we have numerous accounts of his life found in a broad geographical span. In addition to Mark, we have Q, M (which is possibly made of multiple sources), L (also possibly multiple sources), two or more passion narratives, a signs source, two discourse sources, the kernel (or original) Gospel behind the Gospel of Thomas, and possibly others. And these are just the ones we know about, that we can reasonably infer from the scant literary remains that survive from the early years of the Christian church. No one knows how many there actually were. Luke says there were “many” of them, and he may well have been right. And once again, this is not the end of the story." (page 83) and "The reality appears to be that there were stories being told about Jesus for a very long time not just before our surviving Gospels but even before their sources had been produced. If scholars are right that Q and the core of the Gospel of Thomas, to pick just two examples, do date from the 50s, and that they were based on oral traditions that had already been in circulation for a long time, how far back do these traditions go? Anyone who thinks that Jesus existed has no problem answering the question: they ultimately go back to things Jesus said and did while he was engaged in his public ministry, say, around the year 29 or 30. But even anyone who just wonders if Jesus existed has to assume that there were stories being told about him in the 30s and 40s. For one thing, as we will see in the next chapter, how else would someone like Paul have known to persecute the Christians, if Christians didn’t exist? And how could they exist if they didn’t know anything about Jesus?" (page 85)") such as the letters of Paul (a contemporary of Jesus who personally knew eyewitnesses since the mid 30s AD), (Note: Ehrman (2012, pp. 144–146 (see also 130–132)): "In one of his rare autobiographical passages, Paul indicates that just a few years after his conversion he went to Jerusalem and met face-to-face with two significant figures in the early Christian movement: "Then after three years I went up to Jerusalem to consult with Cephas. And I remained with him for fifteen days. I did not see any of the other apostles except James, the brother of the Lord. What I am writing to you, I tell you before God, I am not lying!" (Galatians 1:18–20) [...] He was a member of an even closer inner circle made up of Peter, James, and John. In the Gospels these three spend more time with Jesus than anyone else does during his entire ministry. And of these three, it is Peter, again according to all our traditions, who was the closest [...] In about the year 36, Paul went to Jerusalem to confer with Peter (Galatians 1:18–20). Paul spent fifteen days there. He may not have gone only or even principally to get a rundown on what Jesus said and did during his public ministry. It is plausible, in fact, that Paul wanted to strategize with Peter, as the leader (or one of the leaders) among the Jerusalem Christians, about Paul's own missionary activities, not among the Jews (Peter's concern) but among the Gentiles (Paul's). This was the reason stated for Paul's second visit to see Peter and the others fourteen years later, according to Galatians 2:1–10. But it defies belief that Paul would have spent over two weeks with Jesus's closest companion and not learned something about him—for example, that he lived. Even more telling is the much-noted fact that Paul claims that he met with, and therefore personally knew, Jesus's own brother James. It is true that Paul calls him the "brother of the Lord," not "the brother of Jesus." But that means very little since Paul typically calls Jesus the Lord and rarely uses the name Jesus (without adding "Christ" or other titles). And so in the letter to the Galatians Paul states as clearly as possible that he knew Jesus's brother. Can we get any closer to an eyewitness report than this? The fact that Paul knew Jesus's closest disciple and his own brother throws a real monkey wrench into the mythicist view that Jesus never lived.") (Note: Some examples of Paul's knowledge of the life and teachings of Jesus : born of a woman (Gal 4:4), from Abraham and David's lineage "according to the flesh" (Gal 3:14-16, Rom 1:3); upbringing as a Jew under the Law (Gal 4:4); had 12 apostles (1 Cor 15:5), had family (Gal 1:19, Gal 2:9-12, 1 Cor 9:5); the Last Supper and teaching of bread and wine (1 Cor 11:23-25); was betrayed (1 Cor 11:23-25); was crucified (1 Cor 2:2, Gal 3:1); Jewish involvement in his death (1 Thess 2:14-16); burial, resurrection, appearances to others (1 Cor 15:4-8); Sermon on the Mount allusion (Rom 12:17-19), paying taxes echoes "Render to Caesar" (Rom 13:7); on divorce and marriage (1 Cor 7:10) Blomberg (2022, pp. 601–602), Eddy & Boyd (2007, pp. 202, 208–228), Tuckett (2001, p. 125)) the gospels (as biographies on historical people similar to Xenophon’s Memoirs of Socrates); (Note: Ehrman (2012, pp. 78–79): "What is sometimes underappreciated by mythicists who want to discount the value of the Gospels for establishing the historical existence of Jesus is that our surviving accounts, which began to be written some forty years after the traditional date of Jesus’s death, were based on earlier written sources that no longer survive. But they obviously did exist at one time, and they just as obviously had to predate the Gospels that we now have. The opening words of the Gospel of Luke bear repeating: “Whereas many have attempted to compile a narrative of the things that have been fulfilled among us, just as the eyewitnesses and ministers of the word delivered them over to us, it seemed good to me also, having followed all these things closely from the beginning, to write for you an orderly account” (1:1–3). As we will see more fully in a later context, one needs to approach everything that the Gospel writers say gingerly, with a critical eye. But there is no reason to suspect that Luke is lying here. He knew of “many” earlier authors who had compiled narratives about the subject matter that he himself is about to narrate, the life of Jesus.") non-Christian sources such as Josephus (Jewish historian and commander in Galilee) and Tacitus (Roman historian and Senator). Multiple independent sources affirm that Jesus actually had family.

== Modern scholarship ==
=== Existence of historical Jesus ===
Scholars regard the question of historicity as generally settled in the early 20th century, and scholars agree that a Jewish man named Jesus of Nazareth existed in the Herodian Kingdom of Judea in the 1st century AD. Since the 18th century, three separate scholarly quests for the historical Jesus have taken place, each with distinct characteristics and based on different research criteria, which were often developed during that phase. Modern scholarly research on the historical Jesus focuses on what is historically probable or plausible about Jesus. (Note: Historical probable: Meier (2006, p. 124): "Since in the quest for the historical Jesus almost anything is possible, the function of the criteria is to pass from the merely possible to the really probable, to inspect various probabilities, and to decide which candidate is most probable. Ordinarily the criteria can not hope to do more."; Miles Pattenden, historian, On historians and the historicity of Jesus — a response to John Dickson, ABC Religion: "...few scholars would deny that there must be some kernel of historicity in Jesus’s figure. It is just that they might well also say that it is a stretch to claim this historical person as unequivocally equivalent to the biblical Jesus. Ultimately, the question here is ontological: what makes “Jesus” Jesus? Is it enough that a man called Jesus (or Joshua), who became a charismatic teacher, was born around the turn of the millennium in Palestine? What additional characteristics do we need to ascribe to the historical figure to make him on balance identifiable with the scriptural one? A baptism in the river Jordan? A sermon on the Mount? Death at the hands of Pontius Pilate? What else? Partly because there is no way to satisfy these queries, professional historians of Christianity — including most of us working within the secular academy — tend to treat the question of whether Jesus existed or not as neither knowable nor particularly interesting. Rather, we focus without prejudice on other lines of investigation, such as how and when the range of characteristics and ideas attributed to him arose. In this sense Jesus is not an outlier among similar historical figures. Other groups of historians engage in inquiries similar to those that New Testament scholars pursue, but concerning other key figures in the development of ancient religion and philosophy in Antiquity: Moses, Socrates, Zoroaster, and so on.)

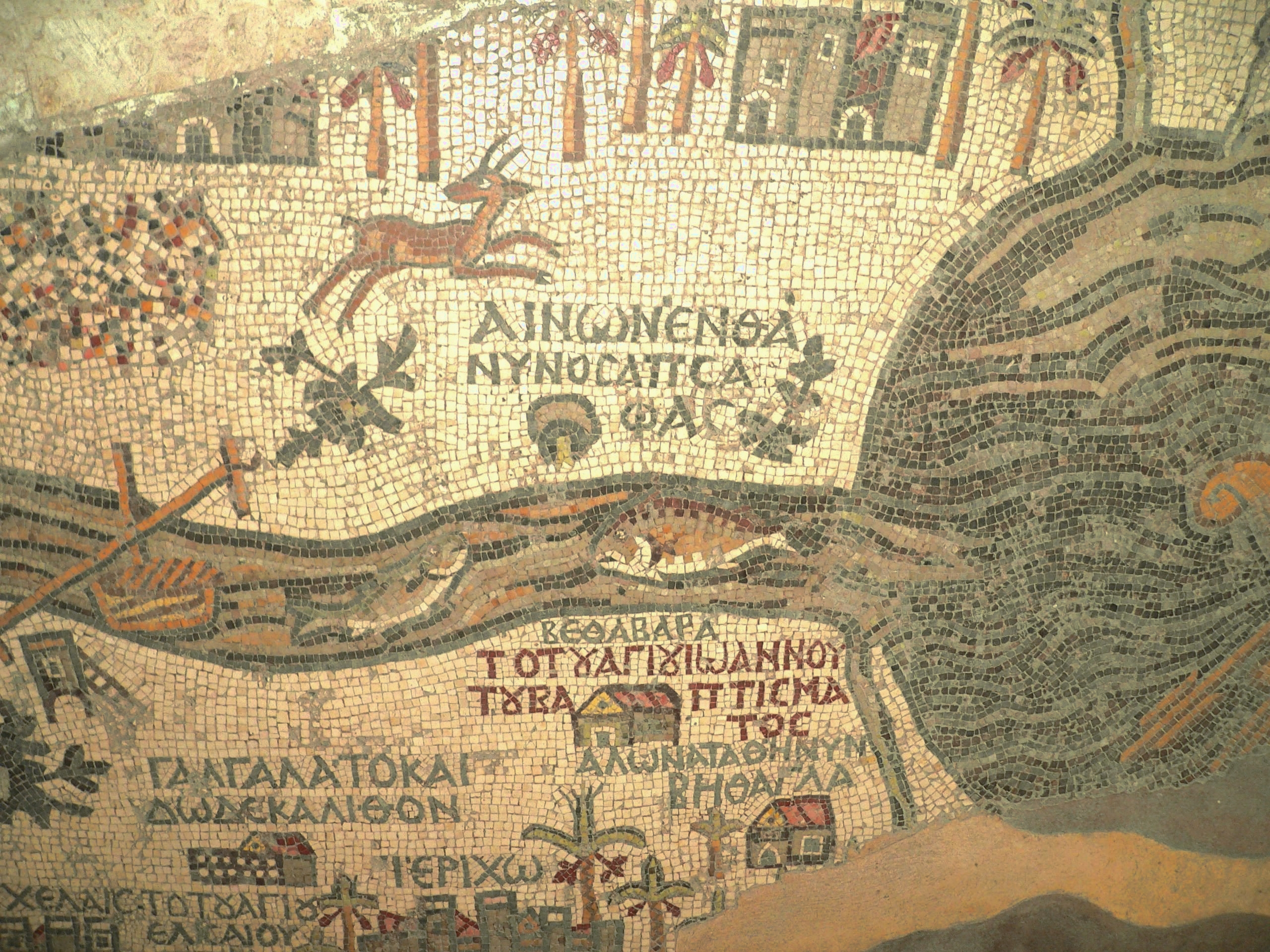
Part of the 6th-century Madaba Map asserting two possible baptism locations

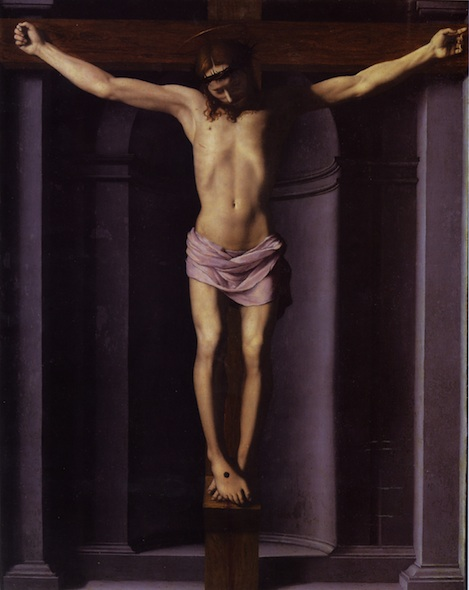
The crucifixion of Jesus as depicted by Mannerist painter Bronzino (c. 1545)

Jesus's death and resurrection seem to have been part of one of the oldest credos as given by Paul, (Note: Together with Jesus is Lord.) but there is no scholarly consensus concerning most elements of Jesus's life as described in the Christian and non-Christian sources. Reconstructions of the "historical Jesus" are broadly debated for their reliability, (Note: Criticism of historical reconstructions: Allison (2009, p. 59): "We wield our criteria to get what we want."; Crook (2013, p. 53): "The traditional criteria, relied upon for so long, are now bankrupt."; Bernier (2016): "Criteria of authenticity, which were considered then to be the state of the art (but whose collective utility was already being called into question by Meyer, among others), are now widely recognized as bankrupt historiographical instruments in need of serious revision or if not outright repudation.") and only two events of this historical Jesus have been subject to "almost universal assent," namely that Jesus was baptized by John the Baptist and was crucified by order of the Roman Prefect Pontius Pilate (who officiated 26–36 AD), (Note: Two facts: Dunn (2003, p. 339) states of "baptism and crucifixion", these "two facts in the life of Jesus command almost universal assent".; Crossan (1994, p. 45) "That he was crucified is as sure as anything historical can ever be, since both Josephus and Tacitus ... agree with the Christian accounts on at least that basic fact.") though even the baptism-narrative has been questioned. Lightfoot Professor of Divinity James Dunn stated that these two facts "rank so high on the 'almost impossible to doubt or deny' scale of historical 'facts' they are obvious starting points for an attempt to clarify the what and why of Jesus' mission." (Note: The scare quotes for 'facts' are copied verbatim from the cited source)

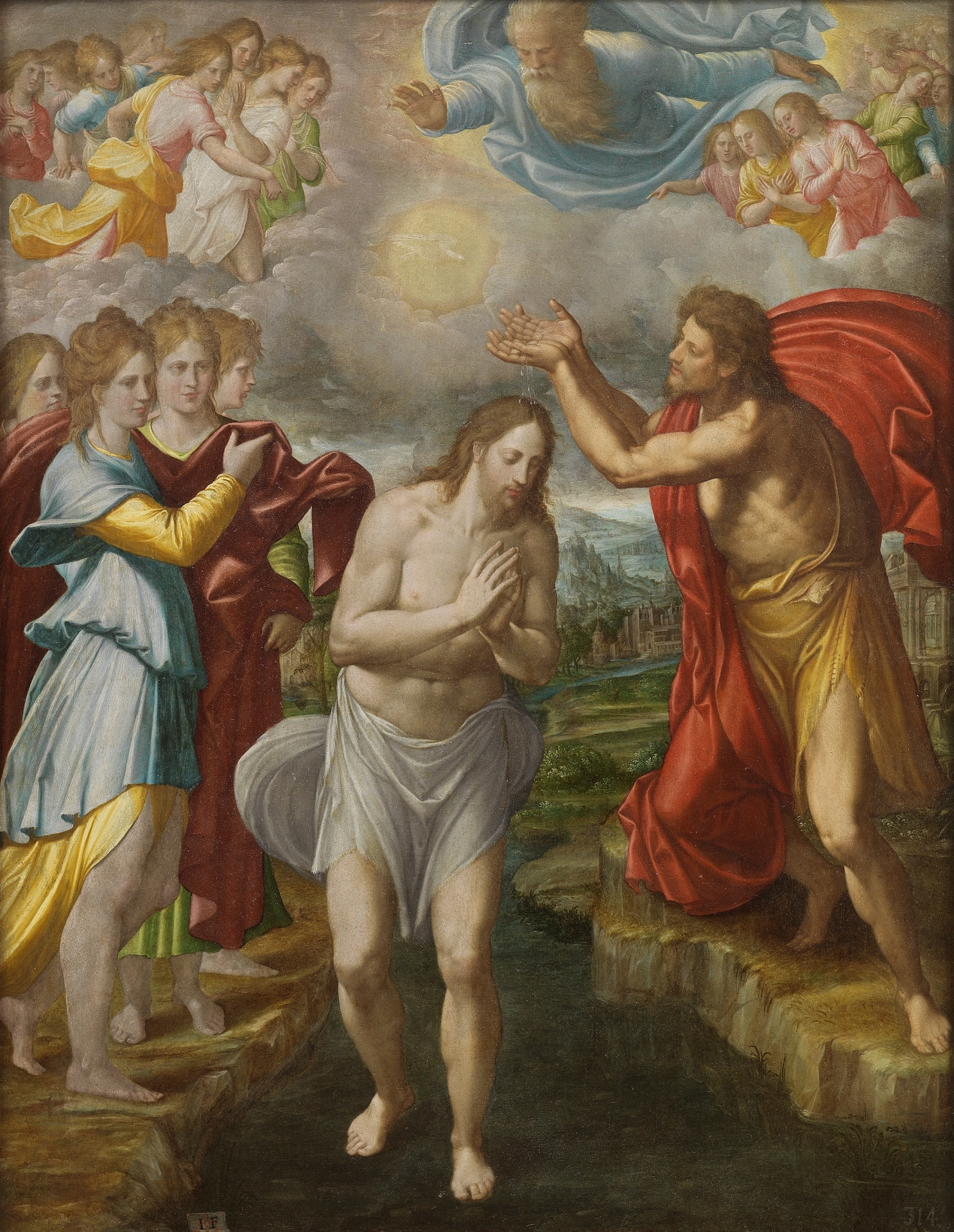
The Baptism of Jesus by Juan Fernández Navarrete (16th century)

Based on the criterion of embarrassment, scholars argue that the early Christian Church would not have invented the painful death of their leader. Scholars vary in their classification of the criterion of embarrassment, either treating it as a subset of the criterion of dissimilarity (Holmén, Polkow) or treating it as its own criterion (Allison, Casey). The criterion of embarrassment is also used to argue in favor of the historicity of the baptism of Jesus, given that John baptised for the remission of sins, although Jesus was viewed as without sin and this positioned John above Jesus. Yet, the usefulness of the criterion of embarrassment has also been questioned, as these dissimilarities do not in themselves prove that these oldest traditions are not also inventions. Nonetheless, other scholars use other methods besides the criteria such as memory studies for the baptism and other elements of the life of Jesus.

In his popular book Did Jesus Exist? (2012), American New Testament scholar Bart Ehrman explained:

Nearly all critical scholars agree at least on those points about the historical Jesus. But there is obviously a lot more to say, and that is where scholarly disagreements loom large – disagreements not over whether Jesus existed but over what kind of Jewish teacher and preacher he was.

A distinction is made between 'the Jesus of history and the Christ of faith', and the historicity of the supernatural elements of the latter narrative, including his purported miracles or resurrection, are outside the reach of the historical methods.

=== Christ myth theory ===
The Christ myth theory, which developed within scholarly research in the 19th century, is, in Geoffrey W. Bromiley's words, the view that "the story of Jesus is a piece of mythology" possessing no "substantial claims to historical fact". Bart Ehrman summarises Earl Doherty's view as being "that no historical Jesus worthy of the name existed, that Christianity began with a belief in a spiritual, mythical figure, that the Gospels are essentially allegory and fiction, and that no single identifiable person lay at the root of the Galilean preaching tradition".

Many mythicism proponents use a three-fold argument developed in the 19th century: that the New Testament has no historical value with respect to Jesus's existence, that there are no non-Christian references to Jesus from the first century, and that Christianity had pagan or mythical roots.

Mythicism has not gained traction among experts. The Christ myth theory has been on the fringes of scholarship for over two centuries, with virtually no support from scholars. Virtually all scholars dismiss theories of Jesus's non-existence or regard them as refuted.

Mythicism is criticized on numerous grounds such as commonly being advocated by non-experts or poor scholarship, being ideologically driven, its reliance on arguments from silence, lacking positive evidence, the dismissal or distortion of sources, questionable or outdated methodologies, either no explanation or wild explanations of origins of Christian belief and early churches, and outdated comparisons with mythology. (Note: Criticisms of mythicism: Gullotta 2017; Marina 2022; Casey 2014; Ehrman 2012; Van Voorst 2003; Eddy & Boyd (2007); Meggitt (2019))

David Gullotta states that modern interest in mythicism has been "amplified by internet conspiracy culture, pseudoscience, and media sensationalism". Justin Meggitt, Professor of the Study of Religion at Cambridge University, partially attributed the recent cultural prominence of mythicism to the popularisation of a new wave of scholarship promoting the idea. Maurice Casey and Ehrman note that many mythicism proponents are either atheists or agnostics. (Note: Ehrman (2012, pp. 336–338): "It is no accident that virtually all mythicists (in fact, all of them, to my knowledge) are either atheists or agnostics. The ones I know anything about are quite virulently, even militantly, atheist.")

== Sources for the historicity of Jesus ==
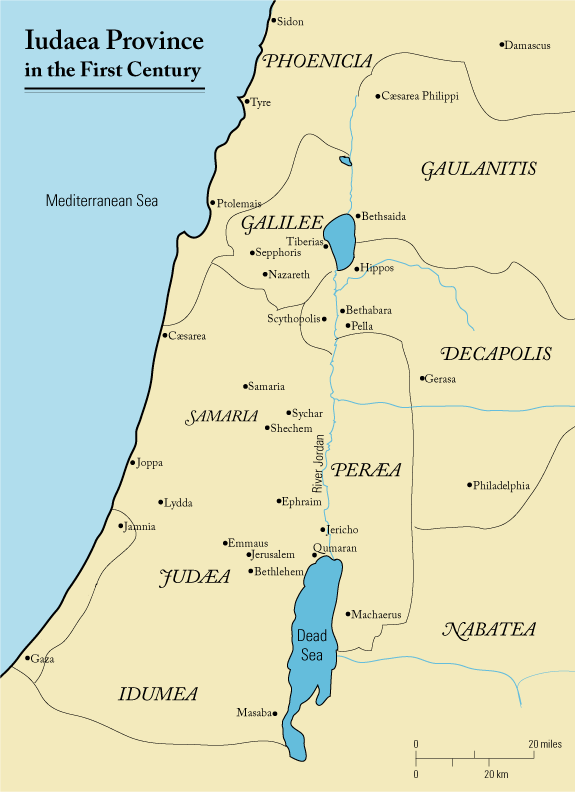
Judea Province during the 1st century

=== Methodological considerations ===
==== Multiple attestation ====
The criterion of multiple attestation looks at the number of early sources that mention Jesus and evaluates the reliability of those sources. To establish the existence of a person without any assumptions, one source from one author (either a supporter or opponent) is needed; for Jesus, there are at least 12 independent sources from five authors in the first century from supporters and 2 independent sources from two authors from non-supporters, most of which represents sources that have become canonical for Christianity. Other independent sources did not survive. Some scholars estimate that there are about 30 independent sources written by 25 authors who attest to Jesus overall.

There are Christian sources on the person of Jesus (the letters of Paul and the Gospels), and there are also Jewish and Roman sources (e.g. Josephus, Suetonius, Tacitus, Pliny the Younger) that mention Jesus. From Paul, Josephus, and Tacitus alone, the existence of Jesus along with the general time and place of his activity can be confirmed.

There are also apocryphal texts that are examples of the wide variety of writings from early Christianity. These are additional independent sources on Jesus's existence, and they corroborate details found in other surviving sources as a "bedrock of historical tradition". Contemporary non-Christian sources in the first and second century never deny the existence of Jesus, and there is also no indication that Pagan or Jewish writers in antiquity who opposed Christianity questioned the existence of Jesus. Taking into consideration that sources on other first-century individuals from Galilee were also written by either supporters or enemies as well, the sources on Jesus cannot be dismissed.

==== Early dates of the Christian oral traditions and Paul ====
Biblical scholarship assumes that the gospel-stories are based on oral traditions and memories of Jesus. These traditions precede the surviving gospels by decades, going back to the time of Jesus and the time of Paul's persecution of the early Christian Jews, prior to his conversion. (Note: Paul's conversion occurred two years after the crucifixion of Jesus.) Paul was already speaking about Jesus in 32 CE, two years after the crucifixion.

According to British biblical scholar and Anglican priest Christopher M. Tuckett, most available sources are collections of early oral traditions about Jesus. He states that the historical value of traditions are not necessarily correlated with the later dates of composition of writings since even later sources can contain early tradition material. Theologians Gerd Theissen and Annette Merz state that these traditions can be dated back well before the composition of the synoptic gospels, that such traditions show local familiarity of the region, and that such traditions were explicitly called "memory", indicating biographical elements that included historical references such as notable people from his era. According to Maurice Casey, some sources, such as parts of the Gospel of Mark, are translations of early Aramaic sources that indicate proximity with eyewitness testimony.

Paul's letters (generally dated to circa 48–62 AD) are the earliest surviving sources on Jesus. Paul adds autobiographical details such as knowing and interacting with eyewitnesses of Jesus, including his most intimate disciples (Peter and John) and family members (his brother James) starting around 36 AD, within a few years of the crucifixion (30 or 33 AD). Paul was a contemporary of Jesus and a fairly full outline of the life of Jesus can be found throughout his letters.

==== Reliability of sources ====
Since the third quest for the historical Jesus, the four gospels and noncanonical texts have been viewed as more useful sources to reconstruct the life of Jesus compared to the previous quests.

German historian of religion Hans-Joachim Schoeps argued that the Gospels are unsatisfactory as they were not written as detailed historical biographies, that the non-Christian sources provide no new information, and that the sources hopelessly intertwine history and legend, but present the views and beliefs of the early disciples and the Christian community. However, evangelical New Testament scholars like Craig Blomberg argue that the source material on Jesus correlates significantly with historical data. (Note: Blomberg (2011, p. 282): "The fruit of a decade of work by the IBR Historical Jesus Study Group, Key Events in the Life of the Historical Jesus: A Collaborative Exploration of Context and Coherence [Ed. Darrell L. Bock and Robert L. Webb (Tübingen: Mohr Siebeck, 2009; Grand Rapids: Eerdmans, forthcoming).] takes a dozen core themes or events from Jesus' life and ministry and details the case for their authenticity via all the standard historical criteria, as well as assessing their significance. The results show significant correlation between what historians can demonstrate and what evangelical theology has classically asserted about the life of Christ.)

Christian origins scholar Craig A. Evans argued that there are also archeological finds that corroborate aspects of the time of Jesus mentioned in the surviving sources, such as context from Nazareth, the Caiaphas ossuary, numerous synagogue buildings, and Jehohanan, a crucified victim who had a Jewish burial after execution. Written sources and archeologist Ken Dark's excavations on Nazareth, the hometown of Jesus, correlate with Jesus' existence, Joseph and Jesus' occupation as craftworkers, presence of literacy, existence of synagogues, Gospel accounts relating to Nazareth, and other Roman period sources on Nazareth.

Archeological research on John's gospel shows it has deep familiarity with mundane details such as the regions, distances between locations, the people, customs, Jewish practices, regional tensions, regional languages, details of crucifixion and there is archeological corroboration of numerous locations it mentions.

==== Other historical persons in first-century AD sources ====
Historiographical approaches associated with the study of the poor in the past, such as microhistory, can help assess what type of sources can be reasonably expected in the historical record for individuals like Jesus. For instance, Justin Meggitt argues that since most people in antiquity left no sign of their existence, especially the poor, it is unreasonable to expect non-Christian sources to corroborate the specific existence of someone with Jesus's socio-economic status. Ehrman argues that the historical record for the first century was so lacking that no contemporary eyewitness reports for prominent individuals such as Pontius Pilate or Josephus survive. Theissen and Merz observe that even if ancient sources were to be silent on any individual, they would not impact their historicity since there are numerous instances of people whose existence is never doubted and yet were not mentioned by contemporary authors. For instance, Paul is not mentioned by Josephus or non-Christian sources; John the Baptist is not mentioned by Paul, Philo, or rabbinic writings; Rabbi Hillel is not mentioned by Josephus - despite him being a Pharisee; Bar Kochba, a leader of the Jewish revolt against the Romans, is not mentioned by Dio Cassius in his account of the revolt.

With at least 14 sources by believers and nonbelievers within a century of the crucifixion, there is more evidence available for Jesus than for other notable people from 1st-century Galilee. Classicist-numismatist Michael Grant argued that when the New Testament is analyzed with the same criteria used by historians on ancient writings that contain historical material, Jesus's existence cannot be denied any more than secular figures whose existence is never questioned.

=== New Testament sources ===
==== Pauline epistles ====
The seven Pauline epistles considered by scholarly consensus to be genuine were written in a span of a decade starting in the late 40s (i.e., approximately 20 to 30 years after the generally accepted time period of Jesus's death) and are the earliest surviving texts that include any information about Jesus. However, Paul was already interacting with eyewitnesses of Jesus by 35 AD, within a few years of the crucifixion, since he wrote about meeting and knowing James, the brother of Jesus (Note: That Jesus had a brother named James is corroborated by Josephus.) (Note: According to Gullotta, James in particular is distinctive.) and Jesus's intimate disciples Peter and John. From Paul's writings alone, a fairly full outline of the life and teachings of Jesus can be found: his descent from Abraham and David, his upbringing in the Jewish Law, gathering together disciples (including Cephas (Peter) and John), having a brother named James, other siblings who had wives, living an exemplary life, the Last Supper and the betrayal, numerous details surrounding his death and resurrection (e.g. crucifixion, Jewish involvement in putting him to death, burial, resurrection; seen by Peter, James, the twelve and others) along with numerous quotations referring to notable teachings and events found in the Gospels. Although Paul the Apostle provides relatively little biographical information about Jesus compared to the Gospels, he was a contemporary of Jesus and provides numerous substantial biographical elements and he makes it clear that he considers Jesus to have been a real person who was "born of a woman" (Note: In Galatians 4:4, Paul states that Jesus was "born of a woman.") and a Jew. (Note: In Romans 1:3, Paul states that Jesus was "born under the law.") The particular term used by Paul to refer to Jesus being 'born of a woman' also relates to human births in other ancient literature such as Plato’s Republic and Josephus’ Antiquities. The brother wording used by Paul "οἱ ἀδελφοὶ τοῦ Κυρίου" (1 Cor 9:5) and "Ἰάκωβον τὸν ἀδελφὸν τοῦ Κυρίου" (Gal 1:19) is the same biological sibling relations grammatical wording found in Greco-Roman texts on siblings of kings and rulers. Additionally, there are independent sources (Mark, John, Paul, Josephus) affirming that Jesus had brothers and other family members (e.g. James, Joseph, Symeon, and Jude).

Craig A. Evans and Ehrman argue that Paul's letters are among the earliest sources that provide a direct link to people who lived with and knew Jesus since Paul was personally acquainted with Peter and John, two of Jesus's original disciples, and James, the brother of Jesus. Paul's first meeting with Peter and James was around 36 AD. Paul is the earliest surviving source to document Jesus' death by crucifixion and his conversion occurred two years after this event. Paul mentioned details in his letters such as that Jesus was a Jew, born of the line of David, and had biological brothers. According to Simon Gathercole, Paul's description of Jesus's life on Earth, his personality, and family tend to establish that Paul regarded Jesus as a natural person, rather than an allegorical figure.

==== Synoptic Gospels ====
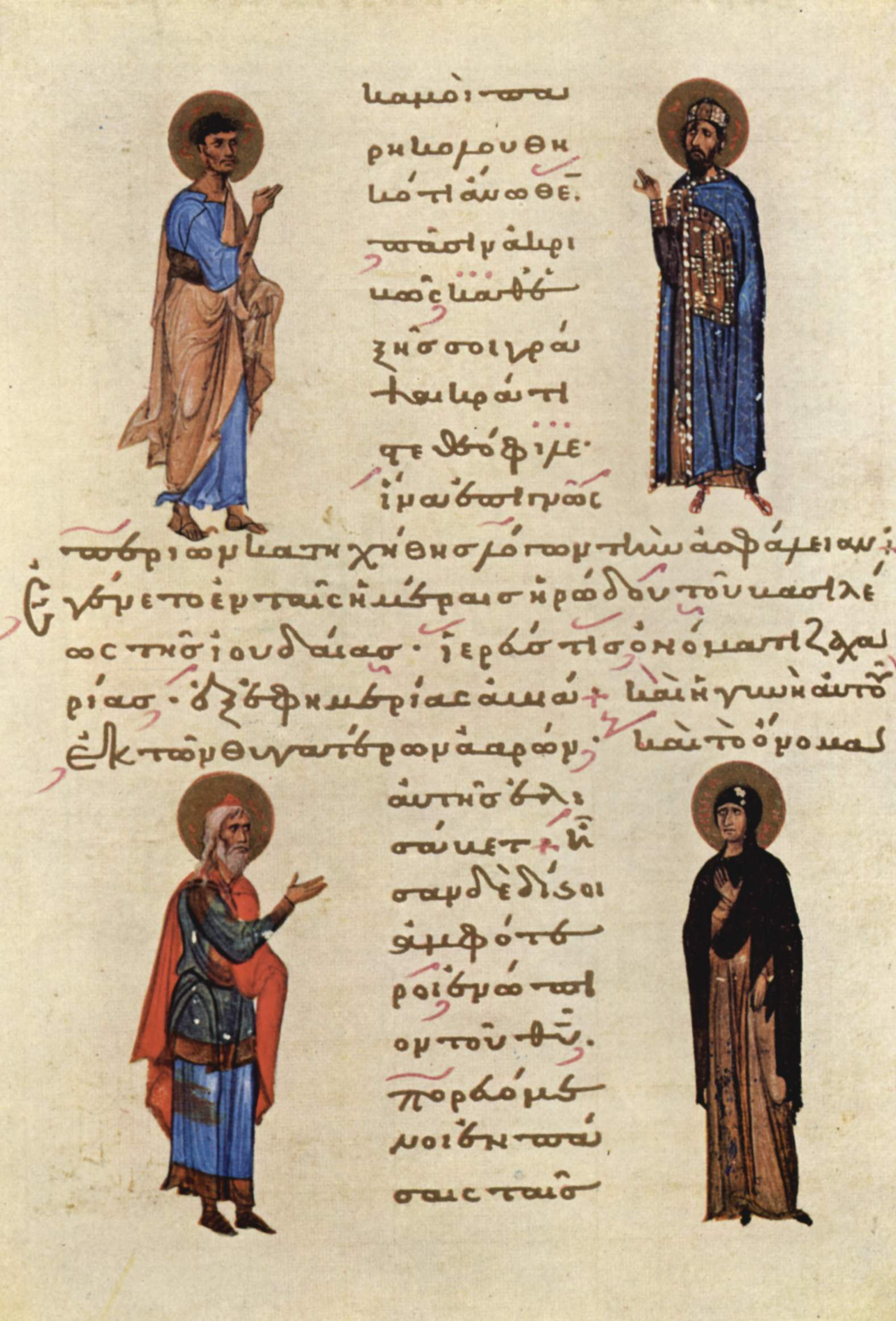
An 11th-century Byzantine manuscript containing the opening of the Gospel of Luke

The synoptic gospels are the primary sources of historical information about Jesus and of the religious movement he founded. Among contemporary scholars, there is consensus that the gospels are a type of ancient biography. similar to Greco-Roman biographies such as Xenophon’s Memoirs of Socrates which narrate the lives of historical people. The Gospels of Matthew, Mark, and Luke recount the life, ministry, crucifixion and resurrection of a Jew named Jesus who spoke Aramaic. On John's gospel, about 85 percent of John's content is unique to John, with 92 percent of its material having no parallels in Mark, rendering the Gospel as an independent document about the life of Jesus and surrounding events. There are different hypotheses regarding the origin of the texts because the gospels of the New Testament were written in Greek for Greek-speaking communities, and were later translated into Syriac, Latin, and Coptic. Scholars argue that the surviving gospels show usage of earlier independent written and oral sources that extended back to the time of Jesus's death, but did not survive. (Note: The Gospel of Luke states that "many have undertaken to compile a narrative of the things which have been accomplished among us.") Aramaic sources have been detected in Mark's Gospel, which could indicate use of early or even eyewitness testimony when it was being written. Historians often study the historical reliability of the Acts of the Apostles when studying the reliability of the gospels, as the Book of Acts was seemingly written by the same author as the Gospel of Luke.

=== Non-Christian sources ===
==== Josephus and Tacitus ====
Non-Christian sources used to study and establish the historicity of Jesus include the c. first century Jewish historian Josephus and Roman historian Tacitus. These sources are compared to Christian sources, such as the Pauline letters and synoptic gospels, and are usually independent of each other. Similarities and differences between these sources are used in the authentication process. From these two independent sources alone, certain facts about Jesus can be adduced: that he existed, his personal name was Jesus, he was called a messiah, he had a brother named James, he won over Jews and gentiles, Jewish leaders had unfavorable opinions of him, Pontius Pilate decided his execution, he was executed by crucifixion, and he was executed during Pilate's governorship. Josephus and Tacitus agree on four sequential points: a movement was started by Jesus, he was executed by Pontius Pilate, his movement continued after his death, and that a group of "Christians" still existed; analogous to common knowledge of founders and their followers like Plato and Platonists.

Josephus was personally involved in Galilee, where Jesus ministered and people who knew him resided, when he was the commander of Jewish forces during the revolt against Roman occupation and trained 65,000-100,000 fighters in the region. His knowledge of Galilee and its inhabitants was notable since he recounted his activities in Galilee in the mid-60s AD in his autobiographical work called The Life of Flavius Josephus as an appendix to Antiquities of the Jews, where the references to Jesus are located. He even stationed in Sepphoris for a time, which was 3 miles away from Jesus's hometown of Nazareth and kept contact with people in the trials of Jesus and his brother James such as the Sanhedrin and Ananus II. Jesus is referenced by Josephus twice, once in Book 18 and once in Book 20 of Antiquities of the Jews, written around 93 to 94 AD. On the first reference, known as the Testimonium Flavianum in Book 18, since the late 20th century, the general consensus has held that the Testimonium is partially authentic in that an authentic nucleus referencing the life of Jesus was original to Josephus. Up to the Enlightenment, the Testimonium was never used in relation to the existence of Jesus since no ancient source or ancient reference to the Testimonium supports negation. On the second reference, Josephus scholar Louis H. Feldman states that "few have doubted the genuineness" of the reference found in Antiquities 20, 9, 1 to "the brother of Jesus, who was called Christ, whose name was James".

Tacitus, in his Annals (written c. 115 AD), book 15, chapter 44, describes Nero's scapegoating of the Christians following the Great Fire of Rome. He writes that the founder of the sect was named Christus (the Christian title for Jesus); that he was executed under Pontius Pilate; and that the movement, initially checked, broke out again in Judea and even in Rome itself. The scholarly consensus is that Tacitus' reference to the execution of Jesus by Pilate is both authentic and of historical value as an independent Roman source.

==== Mishnah ====
The Mishnah (c. 200) may refer to Jesus as it reflects the early Jewish traditions of portraying Jesus as a sorcerer or magician. Other references to Jesus and his execution exist in the Talmud, but they aim to discredit his actions, not deny his existence.

==== Mara bar Serapion ====
Mara bar Serapion was a Stoic philosopher from the Roman province of Syria. In a letter he wrote to his son Serapion he refers to the unjust treatment of "three wise men": the murder of Socrates, the burning of Pythagoras, and the execution of "the wise king" of the Jews. Most scholars date it to shortly after 73 AD during the first century.

== See also ==
- Chronology of Jesus
- Denial of the virgin birth of Jesus
- Historical background of the New Testament
- Historicity of Muhammad
- Historicity of the Bible
- Jesus and history (disambiguation)
- Jesus in comparative mythology
- Jesus in the Talmud
- Jesus Seminar
- Mara bar Serapion on Jesus
- New Testament places associated with Jesus § Archaeology
- Suetonius on Christians

== Sources ==
Printed sources

- Allison, Dale (2009). The Historical Christ and the Theological Jesus. Wm. B. Eerdmans Publishing. ISBN 978-0-8028-6262-4.
- Beilby, James K.; Eddy, Paul Rhodes, eds. (2009). "Introduction". The Historical Jesus: Five Views. Downers Grove, Ill.: IVP Academic. ISBN 978-0830838684.
- Bernier, Jonathan (2016). The Quest for the Historical Jesus after the Demise of Authenticity: Toward a Critical Realist Philosophy of History in Jesus Studies. Bloomsbury Publishing. ISBN 978-0-567-66287-3.
- Blomberg, Craig L. (2007), The Historical Reliability of the Gospels, InterVarsity Press, ISBN 9780830828074
- Blomberg, Craig (2011). "New Testament Studies in North America". In Köstenberger, Andreas J.; Yarbrough, Robert W. (eds.). Understanding The Times: New Testament Studies in the 21st Century. Crossway. ISBN 978-1-4335-0719-9.
- Blomberg, Craig L. (2022). Jesus and the Gospels, Third Edition: An Introduction and Survey (3rd ed.). B&H Academic. ISBN 9781087753157.
- Boyarin, Daniel (2004). Border Lines. The Partition of Judaeo-Christianity. University of Pennsylvania Press.
- Brown, Raymond E. (1997). An Introduction to the New Testament. Doubleday.
- Bromiley, Geoffrey W., ed. (1982). "Jesus Christ". International Standard Bible Encyclopedia (ISBE): fully revised, illustrated, in four volumes. Vol. 2, E–J. Associate editors: Everett F. Harrison, Roland K. Harrison, William Sanford LaSor. William B. Eerdmans Publishing Company. pp. 1034–1049. ISBN 978-0-8028-3785-1. OCLC 500471471.
- Burridge, Richard A.; Gould, Graham (2004). Jesus Now and Then. William B. Eerdmans. pp. 34. ISBN 978-0-8028-0977-3.
- Byrskog, Samuel (2011). "The Historicity of Jesus: How do we know that Jesus existed?". Handbook for the Study of the Historical Jesus (Volume 3). Brill. pp. 2183–2212. ISBN 978-9004163720.
- Bockmuehl, Markus (2001). "7. Resurrection". In Bockmuehl, Markus (ed.). The Cambridge Companion to Jesus. Cambridge University Press. ISBN 9780521796781.
- Carrier, Richard (2014). On the Historicity of Jesus: Why We Might Have Reason for Doubt. Sheffield Phoenix Press. ISBN 9781909697355.
- Casey, Maurice (2014). Jesus: Evidence and Argument or Mythicist Myths?. New York and London: Bloomsbury Academic. ISBN 978-0-56744-762-3.
- Casey, Maurice (2014b), Jesus: Evidence and Argument or Mythicist Myths?, New York and London: Bloomsbury Academic, ISBN 978-0-56744-762-3
- Casey, Maurice (2010). Jesus of Nazareth: An Independent Historian's Account of His Life and Teaching. New York and London: T&T Clark. ISBN 978-0-567-64517-3.
- Charlesworth, James H. (2008). The Historical Jesus: An Essential Guide. Abingdon Press. ISBN 9780687021673.
- Crook, Zeba A. (2013). "Collective Memory Distortion and the Quest for the Historical Jesus". Journal for the Study of the Historical Jesus. 11 (1): 53–76. doi:10.1163/17455197-01101004. ISSN 1476-8690.
- Crossan, John Dominic (1994), Jesus: A Revolutionary Biography, HarperCollins, ISBN 978-0-06-061662-5
- Dark, Ken (2023). Archaeology of Jesus' Nazareth. Oxford University Press. ISBN 9780192865397.
- Davies, W. D.; Sanders, E.P. (2008). "20. Jesus: From the Jewish Point of View". In Horbury, William; Davies, W.D.; Sturdy, John (eds.). The Cambridge History of Judaism. Volume 3: The Early Roman period. Cambridge University Press. ISBN 9780521243773.
- Doherty, Earl (1999). The Jesus Puzzle. Did Christianity Begin with a Mythical Christ? : Challenging the Existence of an Historical Jesus. ISBN 0968601405
- Doherty, Earl (2009). Jesus: Neither God Nor Man – The Case for a Mythical Jesus (Revised, Originally published under the title: The Jesus Puzzle: Did Christianity Begin with a Mythical Christ? – Challenging the Existence of an Historical Jesus ed.). Ottawa: Age of Reason Publications. ISBN 978-0-9689259-2-8.
- Drews, Arthur & Burns, C. Deslisle (1998). The Christ Myth (Westminster College–Oxford Classics in the Study of Religion). ISBN 1573921904
- Dunn, James D. G. (2003), Jesus Remembered, Wm. B. Eerdmans Publishing Co., ISBN 978-0-8028-3931-2
- Dunning, Brian (12 March 2019). "Skeptoid #666: The Historicity of Jesus Christ". Skeptoid.
- Eddy, Paul Rhodes; Boyd, Gregory A. (2007). The Jesus Legend: A Case for the Historical Reliability of the Synoptic Jesus Tradition. Baker Academic. ISBN 978-0-8010-3114-4.
- Ehrman, Bart (2012). Did Jesus Exist?: The Historical Argument for Jesus of Nazareth. HarperOne. ISBN 9780062206442.
- Ehrman, Bart D. (2001). Jesus: Apocalyptic Prophet of the New Millennium. Oxford University Press. ISBN 9780195124743.
- Ehrman, B. (2011). Forged: Writing in the Name of God. Harper Collins. ISBN 978-0-06-207863-6.
- Evans, Craig A. (2001). Jesus and His Contemporaries: Comparative Studies. Leiden: Brill Publishers. ISBN 978-0391041189.
- Evans, Craig (2016). "Mythicism and the Public Jesus of History". Christian Research Journal. 39 (5).
- Fox, Robin Lane (2005), The Classical World: An Epic History from Homer to Hadrian, Basic Books, p. 48, ISBN 978-0465024971
- France, R.T. (2001). The Evidence for Jesus. Hodder & Stoughton.
- George, Augustin & Grelot, Pierre (Eds.) (1992). Introducción Crítica al Nuevo Testamento. Herder. ISBN 8425412773
- Gowler, David B. (2007). What Are They Saying About the Historical Jesus?. Paulist Press.
- Grant, Michael (1977). Jesus: An Historian's Review of the Gospels. Scribner. ISBN 978-0684148892.
- Gray, Patrick (2016). Varieties of Religious Invention: Founders and their Functions in History. Oxford University Press. pp. 113–114. ISBN 978-0199359714.
- Gullotta, Daniel N. (2017). "On Richard Carrier's Doubts: A Response to Richard Carrier's On the Historicity of Jesus: Why We Might Have Reason for Doubt". Journal for the Study of the Historical Jesus. 15 (2–3): 310–346. doi:10.1163/17455197-01502009.
- Hansen, Christopher M. (4 May 2022). "Re-examining the Pre-Christian Jesus". Journal of Early Christian History. 12 (2): 17–40. doi:10.1080/2222582X.2021.2001667. S2CID 246882282.
- Hansen, Chrissy M. (1 August 2025). "Familial Brother(s) of the Lord? On Recent Disagreements on Galatians 1.19 and 1 Corinthians 9.5". The Expository Times. 136 (11): 483–493. doi:10.1177/00145246251346748. ISSN 0014-5246.
- Koester, Helmut (1992). Ancient Christian Gospels. Harrisburg, PA: Continuum. ISBN 978-0334024507.
- Herzog, William A (2005), Prophet and Teacher: An Introduction to the Historical Jesus, Westminster John Knox Press, ISBN 978-0664225285
- Johnson, Paul (2011). Jesus: A Biography from a Believer. Penguin Books. ISBN 978-0143118770.
- Levine, Amy-Jill; Allison, Dale C. Jr.; Crossan, John Dominic (2006). The Historical Jesus in Context. Princeton University Press. ISBN 978-0-691-00992-6.
- Marina, Marko (2022). "Historical Jesus and Mythicism: A Critical Evaluation of Richard Carrier's Theory". Diacovensia. 30 (2): 215–235. doi:10.31823/d.30.2.3.
- Martin, Michael (2014). Burkett, Delbert (ed.). The Blackwell Companion to Jesus. Wiley-Blackwell. ISBN 978-1118724101.
- Meier, John P., A Marginal Jew: Rethinking the Historical Jesus, Anchor Bible Reference Library, Doubleday

(1991), v. 1, The Roots of the Problem and the Person, ISBN 0385264259
(1994), v. 2, Mentor, Message, and Miracles, ISBN 0385469926
(2001), v. 3, Companions and Competitors, ISBN 0385469934
(2009), v. 4, Law and Love, ISBN 978-0300140965

- Meier, John P. (2006). "Criteria: How do we decide what comes from Jesus?". In Dunn, James D. G.; McKnight, Scot (eds.). The Historical Jesus in Recent Research. Eisenbrauns. ISBN 1575061007.
- Meggitt, Justin J. (October 2019). "'More Ingenious than Learned'? Examining the Quest for the Non-Historical Jesus". New Testament Studies. 65 (4): 458–459. doi:10.1017/S0028688519000213. S2CID 203247861.
- Mendenhall, George E. (2001). Ancient Israel's Faith and History: An Introduction to the Bible in Context. ISBN 0664223133
- Messori, Vittorio (1977). Jesus hypotheses. St Paul Publications. ISBN 0854391541
- New Oxford Annotated Bible with the Apocrypha, New Revised Standard Version. (1991) New York, Oxford University Press. ISBN 0195283562
- Powell, Mark Allan (1998), Jesus as a Figure in History: How Modern Historians View the Man from Galilee, Westminster John Knox Press, ISBN 978-0-664-25703-3
- Price, Robert M. (2010). Secret Scrolls: Revelations from the Lost Gospel Novels. Wipf and Stock. ISBN 978-1610970754.
- Price, Robert M. (2009). "Jesus at the Vanishing Point". In Beilby, James K.; Eddy, Paul R. (eds.). The Historical Jesus: Five Views. InterVarsity Press. ISBN 978-0-8308-3868-4.
- Rodriguez, Rafael (2012). "The Embarrassing Truth About Jesus: The Criterion of Embarrassment and the Failure of Historical Authenticity". In Le Donne, Anthony; Keith, Chris (eds.). Jesus, Criteria, and the Demise of Authenticity. T&T Clark. p. 132-151.
- Stanton, Graham (2002). The Gospels and Jesus (Oxford Bible Series) (2nd ed.). Oxford University Press. p. 145. ISBN 978-0199246168.
- Tuckett, Christopher (2001). "8. Sources and Methods". In Bockmuehl, Markus (ed.). The Cambridge Companion to Jesus. Cambridge University Press. ISBN 978-0-521-79678-1.
- Theissen, Gerd; Merz, Annette (1998). The Historical Jesus: A Comprehensive Guide. Minneapolis MN: Fortress Press. ISBN 978-0-8006-3122-2.
- Van Voorst, Robert E. (2000). Jesus Outside the New Testament: An Introduction to the Ancient Evidence. Grand Rapids, MI: Wm. B. Eerdmans Publishing Co. ISBN 0802843689.
- Van Voorst, Robert E. (2003). "Nonexistence Hypothesis". In Houlden, James Leslie (ed.). Jesus in History, Thought, and Culture: An Encyclopedia. Vol. 2: K–Z. ABC-CLIO. pp. 658–660. ISBN 978-1-57607-856-3.
- Weaver, Walter P. (1999), The Historical Jesus in the Twentieth Century: 1900–1950, A&C Black
- Wells, George A. (1988). The Historical Evidence for Jesus. Prometheus Books. ISBN 087975429X
- Wells, George A. (1998). The Jesus Myth. ISBN 0812693922
- Wells, George A. (2004). Can We Trust the New Testament?: Thoughts on the Reliability of Early Christian Testimony. ISBN 0812695674
- Wells, George (2007). Flynn, Tom (ed.). The New Encyclopedia of Unbelief. Amherst, N.Y.: Prometheus Books. ISBN 9781591023913.
- Wilson, Ian (2000). Jesus: The Evidence (1st ed.). Regnery Publishing.
