= Paul-Louis Couchoud =

French writer and philosopher

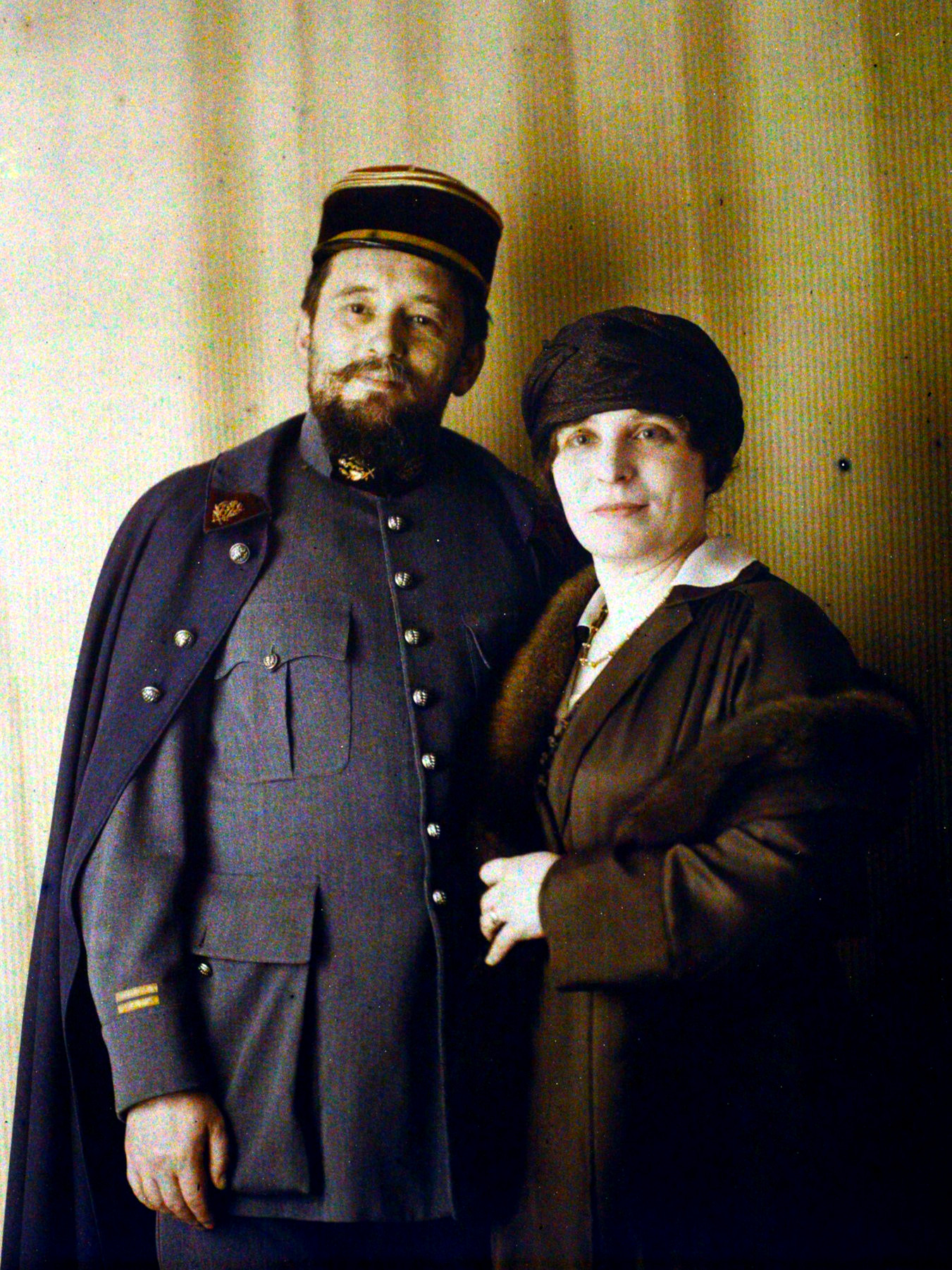
1919 Autochrome of Paul-Louis Couchoud with his wife Anthippe, by Auguste Léon

Paul-Louis Couchoud (French: [kuʃu]; July 6, 1879, in Vienne, Isère – April 8, 1959, in Vienne) was a French philosopher, a graduate from the prestigious École Normale Supérieure in Paris, a physician, a man of letters, and a poet. He became well known as an adapter of Japanese haiku into French, an editor of Reviews, a translator, and a writer promoting the German thesis of the non-historicity of Jesus Christ.

== Education in philosophy ==
In 1898, Paul-Louis Couchoud entered the École Normale Supérieure (at 45, rue d'Ulm, Paris, called "ENS rue d'Ulm"), a special college-level institute in Paris for French elite students in arts and sciences selected every year through a national competition. He graduated in 1901 as an “agrégé” (lecturer) in philosophy. The French degree is not directly comparable to an American one, as it is granted to a few dozens of top-ranked students in a national competition held once a year.

== Visit to Japan and interest in Japanese poetry ==
Couchoud obtained a scholarship from the banker Albert Kahn. This grant allowed Couchoud to visit Japan (September 1903 – May 1904), a country which became a passion. During a trip on French canals by barge (1905), Couchoud and his two friends, sculptor Albert Poncin and painter André Faure, composed haiku in French. They published their work anonymously in a limited edition (30 copies) of Au fil de l'eau (Along the waterways), a collection of free-verse tercets which was well received. It still is considered one of the most successful adaptations of haiku in French. Couchoud also studied and translated Japanese Haijin (Yosa Buson in particular) in Les Épigrammes lyriques du Japon (Lyrical Epigrams of Japan, 1906).

Couchoud made later two more trips to Japan and China, from which resulted his collection Sages et poètes d’Asie (published as Japanese Impressions, 1920). In 1955, Marguerite Yourcenar wrote: "I have never met P. L. Couchoud, but one of his books, Sages et poètes d’Asie, which I still have in a hardback edition on my bookshelves in Northeast Harbor, may have been the first work through which I encountered Asian poetry and thought. I was fifteen then, and I still know by heart some haiku translated or adapted by him; this exquisite book was for me the equivalent of a half-open door. It has never closed. How much would I have loved to go and visit P. L. Couchoud with you, and thank the sick poet for all what he made me feel or resonate".

== Friendship with the writer Anatole France ==
In 1907, Couchoud became acquainted with the famous French writer Anatole France (1844–1924), becoming his friend and confidante until A. France's death in 1924. The French writer was famous as being the model of the ideal French man of letters. He was a passionate critic of the Catholic Church, and an avowed opponent of the clerical political factions. He supported the Jew Alfred Dreyfus in the world-famous Dreyfus Affair. He received the Nobel Prize for literature in 1921, and in 1922 all his books were placed on the Index Librorum Prohibitorum of the Vatican.

Couchoud took part in the sessions of the "Salon" organized by Leontine Lippmann, Anatole France's friend and "muse", known after her marriage as "Madame Arman de Caillavet".

Couchoud became Anatole France's doctor, and, upon the death of Leontine Lippmann (1910), he paid regular visits to A. France at the Villa Saïd, in his quality of physician, and also as a friend, to bring him consolation during his mourning. He convinced A. France to go on another journey in Italy to overcome his grief. Couchoud acted as witness at the wedding of Anatole France and Emma Laprévotte (October 1920). After France's death, Couchoud said of him: "For more than twenty years I have known him as if he were a gentle father, always ready to listen and guide you".

== Becoming a doctor in medicine ==
In the mid 1900s, Couchoud decided to study medicine. At the same time, Albert Schweitzer was making the same choice in Germany after his studies in theology. After an internship at the "Maison nationale" of Charenton, Couchoud became an intern in the asylum system of the Paris administration. He worked at the "Maison Blanche Asylum" as an assistant of Marc Trénel (May 1909 – April 1910). Trenel entered a very complimentary appraisal of his assistant in his file (December 1909): "High intelligence, encyclopedic knowledge, highly sophisticated mind. His future will be extraordinary ". This assessment was confirmed by Albert Paraz who said of him: "... a man of amazing culture, reading all the ancient languages. He was so aggrieved when I confessed that I didn’t understand them that, in the end, I made him believe that I could at least speak Latin and Greek ..."

Couchoud presented in Paris his doctorate thesis on primitive asthenia (1911). He became director of a health center in Saint-Cloud, where he took care of Anatole France, a center owned by Anthippe Sevastos, the sculptor Antoine Bourdelle's sister-in-law, whom Couchoud ended up marrying (May 1918). In 1922, Couchoud became a doctor at the leading Cochin hospital in Paris.

When the French writer Jules Romains started conducting experiments on "extra-retinal vision" (1917), criticisms of this pseudo-science obliged him to interrupt his "research" until 1922. One such session took place at Anatole France's home, which was witnessed by co-signing doctors, including Couchoud, who at the time offered his own home for another session (December 1922).

== The question of the historicity of Jesus, and the German "Christ myth" thesis ==
=== Encountering the "German thesis" ===
Couchoud became intrigued by the German Christ Myth Theory after reading Orpheus (1909), a history of religions by Salomon Reinach (1858–1932), another graduate of the "ENS". Jacques Chevalier, a close friend of Couchoud since their time at the "ENS" as students in philosophy, was reported describing Couchoud's decisive encounter with the new ideas: "[A]fter attending Loisy's lectures at the Collège de France, Couchoud became convinced by a German thesis denying the historicity of Jesus. Which did not prevent him from using some poetic language when discussing Christianity, for instance in The Enigma of Jesus (1924) and The God Jesus (1951)".

=== Editor of reviews on religions ===
In the 1920s and 1930s, Couchoud became an editor of major media projects on the history of religions. "Archibald Robertson" wrote that "[T]he works of Paul Louis Couchoud are such a joy to read that their style alone must have made many converts."

== First article and book: The Enigma of Jesus (1923) ==
=== Introduction by James G. Frazer ===
Couchoud presented his thesis in a first article published in the literary review Mercure de France: "The Enigma of Jesus", (March 1923), and developed it in his first book, The Enigma of Jesus (1923), which carried an introduction by the Scottish anthropologist James G. Frazer, the famous author of The Golden Bough (1890), a pioneering study of primitive mythology and comparative religion. Frazer had initially strongly rejected the Jesus myth thesis, but he modified his original view while giving credit to Couchoud for his calm and reasoned analysis without adopting his hypothesis: "[W]hether Dr. Couchoud be right or wrong [in denying the historicity of Jesus]...he appears to have laid his finger on a weak point in the chain of evidence on which hangs the religious faith of a great part of civilized mankind." Frazer's contribution and more open stance gave a marked credibility to Couchoud.

=== Jesus, a divine product of his cult ===
Couchoud rejects Robertson's hypothesis of a pre-Christian cult of Joshua, for which he finds no evidence. He presents his thesis in his article in the following terms:

"Jesus is an unknown historical figure. It is possible that he may have lived, since millions of people have lived without leaving a trace. It is not enough to declare 'We know nothing about Jesus, except that he existed'. On the contrary, we must boldly assert that 'We do not know anything about him, not even whether he existed'. In historical research, only the strictest accuracy permits us to say anything more. However, the very document which would positively prove the existence of Jesus is missing...Jesus belongs to history thanks to his name and the cult built around him, but he is not a historical figure. He is a divine being, whose knowledge was slowly developed by Christian minds. He was begotten in faith, in hope and in love. He was shaped by emotional fervor. He has been given changing figures by various forms of worship. He was born the moment he got his first believer... His only reality is spiritual. Everything else is phantasmagoria."

=== Critics ===
In the Creation of Christ (1939), they will be pushed to a later date, around 135–140. Couchoud was countered by articles written by the Jesuit Léonce de Grandmaison, and the Protestant Maurice Goguel also in Le Mercure de France.

== Second article and book: The Mystery of Jesus (1924) ==
=== Other early Christian documents confirm Paul's doctrine ===
Couchoud continued exposing his thesis in a series of lectures to a cultural association, the Union pour la Vérité ("Union for Truth") in early 1924. He published a second article, "The Mystery of Jesus" (March 1924), after having presented the proofs for inspection to A. France, assuring him that "You know that I have given you my heart". Couchoud produced a second book of the same title as the article, to complete his exposé, The Mystery of Jesus (March 1924). In this second book, Couchoud reproduced his two articles of the Mercure de France, adding three more chapters. "At the origin of Christianity there is, if I am right, not a personal biography, but a collective mystical experience, sustaining a divine history mystically revealed." (p. 117) He attempted to show that the study of the Apocalypse (Revelation of John) and of the non-Pauline epistles confirmed the conclusions drawn from the Pauline epistles. Only the testimony of Paul of Tarsus is valid. The docetic form of Christianity should be the orthodox one, if Paul is defined as the true founder of Christianity.

=== No ordinary man becoming deified ===
As a first step, Couchoud argued that it is impossible to assume that Jews would have deified a mere man. The methodology followed by contemporary historians, from Ernest Renan to Alfred Loisy, in trying to understand the figure of Jesus and the origins of Christianity, faced two major obstacles: One cannot accept that after one generation or even less, an ordinary man could be deified, and, second, that Jesus's life could have escaped the attention of historians: there is no documentation of it. Couchoud believes that the entire "Testimonium Flavianum" (the famous passage in Josephus's Antiquities of the Jews, III, iii, 3 which mentions of Jesus "He was the Christ") is an interpolation. Everything in the Talmud concerning Jesus is derived from Christian sources . Of the three Roman "witnesses" (Suetonius, Pliny the Younger and Tacitus) Suetonius only mentions a Jewish agitator named Chrestos. Couchoud considers the Christ mention in the Tacitus passage genuine. But these Roman "witnesses" only testify to the existence of a Christian movement, and concerning the origin of this movement, they only repeated Christian beliefs.

=== Couchoud and the French rationalists ===
Couchoud's Mystery of Jesus was a slim volume, not impressive by scholarly standards, but, in the France of 1924, it packed a lot of weight. Couchoud became de facto the leader of French rationalists on the subject of religion from 1924 to 1939. He was chief editor for a series of publications on religion and free thinking: "Christianity" (which lasted ten years, 1923–1932, publishing 42 works), "Judaism", and "Myths and Religions", amounting to some 100 works.

Couchoud was made editor of a new section, "Chronicle of Ideas" in the magazine "Europe" (Jan. 1927). The magazine published various articles popularizing Couchoud's thesis that Jesus was not a historic figure—to the objection of the French writer Romain Rolland. But after 1928, the Couchoud faction lost some of its influence with the publisher. Europe published Couchoud's last article, "Le problème de Jésus", in June 1934.

== Jésus, Le Dieu fait homme (1937), or The Creation of Christ (1939) ==
The original French title was Jésus, Le Dieu fait homme ("Jesus: The God made man", 1937). Challenged and criticized from all sides in France, Couchoud published his book as a public answer. Couchoud had the advantage of the advanced research published by three elite scholars: the independent historian Charles Guignebert, the Protestant theologian Maurice Goguel, and the excommunicated critic of the Catholic Church Alfred Loisy.

Couchoud displayed no acrimony against Christianity, and always showed respect and appreciation for it, occasionally using poetic language to describe Jesus and his influence. He dedicated the book "to the memory of that most noble man", John Mackinnon Robertson (1856–1933), accepting his idea that a myth and a cult must have preceded the development of the figure of Christ and of the Christian religion.

Couchoud did not believe that a human Jesus had existed. Couchoud believed that the figure of Jesus Christ had been originally conceived by Jews as a purely 'heavenly Man' who announced a cosmic transformation. This heavenly Jesus was amplified and diffused through the mystery books ("apocalypses"). "It was only much later that he was made flesh and blood [in the Gospels] on paper. Thus Christ was created", as a "literary creation".

In The Creation of Christ, Couchoud told a story in which Marcion wrote the first gospel, followed by Basilides, Mark, Matthew, John and Luke; Mark knew Paul's theology; the Acts of the Apostles is a thoroughly reliable historical source; and Clement of Rome is the likely author of the Gospel of Luke.

The book of 459 pages was published in two slim volumes. It consists of three parts, with 22 chapters and 2 Appendices:

- Part 1 THE APOCALYPSES (168 B.C. – A.D. 40), 7 chapters - "Appearance of secret and mysterious books": Daniel, Enoch, Moses.
- Part 2 THE PROPHETS (A.D. 40–130), 5 chapters - The eruptive and anarchic activity of Christian prophets.
- Part 3 THE GOSPELS (A.D. 130–150), 10 chapters - Books that "fix and regulate the faith".
- Appendix I: The Gospel According to Marcion
- Appendix II: The Historicity of Jesus (Response to Loisy in Hibbert Journal )

== Reception and criticisms ==
Couchoud's thesis was received with passionate reactions in France, a culture traditionally dominated by Catholicism, and he became subjected to a wave of criticisms from various quarters.

=== Léonce de Grandmaison, Jesus in history and in mystery (1924) ===
Léonce de Grandmaison (1868–1927), a priest of the Society of Jesus, founder of the magazine Research in Religion science, also answered Couchoud's 1923 article in the Mercure de France (August 1923) with his own article, "Jesus in History", which became the basis for his book, Jesus in history and in mystery (1924). He claimed that Couchoud's work was the "dream of a poet rather than the work of an historian". He followed with an article "Recent French discussion of the Historical Existence of Jesus Christ." Couchoud's policy was to make no formal response to criticisms.

=== Maurice Goguel's response, Jesus of Nazareth: Myth or History? (1925) ===
The debate of the historicity of Jesus (Goguel) against the denial of historicity (Couchoud) unfurled in Paris during 1923–1925. Maurice Goguel (1880–1955) was a professor at the Faculty of Protestant Theology and the Sorbonne University in Paris. Representing a group of liberal exegetes, he responded to Couchoud's first article (1923), with an article also published in the Mercure de France (June 1923), entitled "About the Enigma of Jesus". To better criticize Couchoud's ideas, he also joined the discussions of "The Union for Truth". Finally, he tackled the whole issue of Couchoud's non-historicity thesis in his Jesus of Nazareth: Myth or History? (1925, transl. 1926).

=== Charles Guignebert, Jesus (1933) ===
The liberal historian Charles Guignebert (1867–1939), professor of "History of ancient and medieval Christianity" at the Sorbonne University, had been raised without any religious education, and studying Christianity as a professional historian free of religious bias and apologetics, as shown in his The Jesus Problem (1914). He defended the historicity of Jesus in an article in the Review of History of Religions (1926), then with his book Jesus (1933), criticizing the historicity denial of the major advocates of the time: Paul-Louis Couchoud, William Benjamin Smith, John M. Robertson, Peter Jensen, Albert Kalthoff, and Arthur Drews. On the other hand, however, he considered that research from Catholic circles was tainted with dogmatic bias. Like Alfred Loisy, Guignebert objected to the apologetic use of historical criticism, as it tends to confuse history with theology, a literary genre characterizing the works of a whole group of French Catholic writers carefully identified in his book.

The Jesuit Joseph Huby published his book, The Mythomaniacs of the Rationalist Union (1933) as a rebuttal to The Question of Jesus and the Origins of Christianity (1932), jointly published by P. L. Couchoud, Prosper Alfaric, and Alfred Loisy, a book already condemned and placed on the Index by the Vatican (June 1933).

=== Alfred Loisy's History and Myth of Jesus (1938) ===
Loisy had remained silent when Couchoud published The Mystery of Jesus (1924), refusing to make any public commentary. In addition, Couchoud, had been using Loisy's scholarship, considering his own thesis as a logical continuation of Loisy's analysis. in a spirit of friendship, Couchoud had organised Loisy's jubilee celebration (1927). Their relationship had created the public impression that Loisy was agreeing with Couchoud.

In his book, La Naissance du Christianisme (1933), transl. The Birth of the Christian Religion, (1948), Loisy had expressed doubts about "the noisy conjectures...[which] seem to me somewhat fragile. These conjectures arise generally from persons who have arrived late at the problem of Jesus, and who have not previously made any profound study of the history of Israel and of Christianity...With us P.L Couchoud... postulating a pre-Christian myth of the Suffering Jahve, which a vision of Simon Peter suddenly transformed into a living religion." (p. 6). In his Memoirs Loisy later wrote that he had worried about giving Couchoud too much publicity. He had taken note that Couchoud was close to former radical priests who had also been excommunicated), including Joseph Turmel—sufficient grounds to arouse Loisy's distrust. Loisy, after a long silence, felt the need to speak out publicly in an article in the Hibbert Journal, "Was Jesus a Historical Person?", then in his book History and Myth of Jesus (1938), attacking Couchoud's non-historicity. He dismissed "Couchoud's central point being the metamorphosis into history, through the initiative of Marcion, of a myth that sprang from Jewish apocalyptic."

=== Couchoud's response to Loisy, "The Historicity of Jesus" (1939) ===
Couchoud was extremely hurt by Loisy's publication, whom he counted as a friend and ally. He wrote to Loisy:

"A friend told me that you have devoted the contents of a whole booklet against my last book. I will not read it, because I have learnt at the same time that it is insignificant in its criticism, and noteworthy only for the hatred it manifests. I'm rather proud of the hatred that I have inspired in you through the help I have given you. One must have enemies: it keeps you warm. I regret, poor man, that after having held you in some esteem, I now have to despise you to such a degree." (June 4, 1938).

Couchoud responded to Loisy with an article in the same Hibbert Journal. He attached this response as appendix II to The Creation of Christ. He summarized the confrontation: "The historicity of Jesus is an article of faith." (Appendix II, p. 447). However, Couchoud reiterated his affirmation of the power of the spiritual figure of the Heavenly Christ. "[It] has no relation to the conception of a man elevated to divinity nor to that of the anthropomorphic God, both of which were familiar to the religion of antiquity. It is an intimate and unique synthesis in which God retains his glory in its fullness and man his mortal destiny in its bitterness, without change of God into man or of man into God. It was a new idea, and it was by this new idea that the world was conquered."

==== "Myth" versus "religious conception" ====
Couchoud explained his own use of the word myth. A "myth" is a narrative aiming at shaping beliefs. A religious conception animates rites, rituals and behaviors: "I am concerned [with] the history of a religious conception." Myth is easily derogatory; it explains a natural fact, a rite, or an idea as a "narrative", to help the mind grasp, and remember rules or beliefs. A "religious conception", is "simpler and deeper, far more unsophisticated and fertile. Its relation to rites and myths is primordial. Zeus is a religious conception. The punishment of the Danaids is a myth."

The Heavenly Christ is such a "religious conception": "I regard it as philosophically impossible that the conception of the God-Man, the Saviour of the world, can have originated in any event of history...[I]t is a great religious creation which arose in the context of the mystery cults and was founded on earlier conceptions and vitalized by mystic illuminations. Its consequences were developed slowly and in sequence."

=== George Santayana – Saving the "Idea of Christ" ===
George Santayana (1863–1952) was an agnostic strongly influenced by Charles Darwin's evolution, who admired Lucretius and Spinoza. He had a soft attitude to religion, calling it the "Spiritual Life", and, as an "aesthetic Catholic", valuing the poetic and aesthetic benefits of belief to consciousness. He was sensitive to the major dilemma between accepting the skeptical findings of historical criticism (Jesus Christ was a myth), and saving the "spiritual" value of the "Idea of Christ". He thus shared some of Couchoud's dual ideas towards Christianity, and even some of Drews, who had claimed that the ideal Christ was a better object of cult for Christianity than a historic Christ.

"Your letter, accompanying Robertson's Jesus-Myth or History, certainly represents just what I think on that subject, and I am pleased to see how clearly you put it. But there is the other side of the question, the positive history and appeal of the Idea of Christ, which Couchoud feels much more adequately than Robertson, and I was a bit disappointed in finding that Robertson had nothing to add in that direction; nor do the other recent writers he mentions seem to have any new lights. Couchoud is warmer; but on the other hand he does not inspire any confidence, whereas Robertson at least is cautious and reasonable in his conclusions. If I were younger, I should be tempted to write a companion volume, or counterblast, to my Idea of Christ in the Gospel, in the form of Probabilities about Jesus in the Real World. There is hardly any evidence, but there are suggestions that could be sifted and combined, to make a tragic picture. Somebody will doubtless do it some day: but will he be able to be both critical and inspired?"

=== Jean Guitton's testimony after Couchoud's death ===
Couchoud, as a psychiatrist, accepted the idea that a religious movement could originate with psychological events such as visions, interpreted by imagination, very close to the symptoms of some psychiatric diseases. As a matter of psychiatric interest, he wanted to visit a French female "mystic" (mystique), Marthe Robin (1902–1981), not far from Vienne, where he had retired. She was a female peasant, paralyzed since 1928 following undocumented mental traumas, and spending her life in bed, in a dark room, reportedly without food. She had claimed visions of the Virgin Mary, and having received the stigmata in 1930.

Jean Guitton (1901–1999) was also a philosophy graduate of the ENS, like Couchoud, and a disciple of Henri Bergson (yet another philosophy graduate of the ENS, and a 1927 Nobel Prize for Literature, 1859–1941). Guitton was a French Catholic philosopher interested in mysticism, and a friend of Couchoud. Guitton interceded with the local archbishop to overcome the resistance of the mystic's Catholic priest who was her "spiritual director" and allow visits by Couchoud. Guitton described his last conversation with Couchoud, discussing the mystic on the quay of the Vienne train station, when Couchoud recited a short poem about the mystic.

==== Reported deathbed conversion of Couchoud ====
Guitton later reported in his book, 26 years after Couchoud's death, that "a quarter of an hour before his death, Couchoud received by chance the visit of a priest. He died "in the faith" [il mourut dans la foi], as I had the opportunity to say it at his funeral." This "testimony" by Jean Guitton became the source of a French legend that Couchoud would have "converted" on his deathbed, spread in print by most French publications.

The reliability of this account has been disputed by those who doubt that the philosopher/psychiatrist, who had been an admirer of Spinoza, a skeptical rationalist all his life, and a standard-bearer of the Christ Myth thesis, would have reversed his lifetime convictions during a short unverified conversation on his deathbed.

== Couchoud's non-historicity thesis abandoned in French academia ==
=== Predominance of the historicity thesis in French scholarship ===
The thesis denying the historicity of Jesus has been abandoned by French academic studies since 1933, thanks to the critical work of the secular historian Charles Guignebert. Daniel Marguerat, a Swiss Protestant, former professor of NT at the University of Lausanne, wrote that: "We are no longer in the age when Bruno Bauer (1840), or P. L. Couchoud (1937) went to great lengths to deny that Jesus had existed: Nowadays the debate is about the meaning of his actions, not his existence. Hermann Reimarus is the first source of doubts on the reliability of the Gospels' information on Jesus's life."

Étienne Trocmé, a Protestant, President of the Un. of Humanities in Strasbourg, said that "these brilliant ideas of Couchoud’s have been easily refuted by Maurice Goguel ... and Alfred Loisy... They face two insurmountable difficulties: the absence of any denial of the existence of Jesus in ancient times—even among the opponents of Christianity and among those heretics that were the most eager to get rid of the humanity of Jesus — and then the Jewish and specifically Palestinian characteristics that abound in the Synoptic Gospels and make it impossible for them to be the belated creation of a largely Hellenized church. We wish the present epigones of Couchoud and Alfaric would stop rehashing arguments so entirely discredited, that even Soviet historians themselves do not support them any more".

A review of the French ideas about Jesus denial (French mythisme) was presented by Charles Maignial, "Quick remarks on mythicism in the history of religions and of faith."

=== The question of the "historical Jesus" eclipsed by the "Jesus of faith" ===
A reviewer of Stéphane's book (1962), asked: "Should we conclude that the question [of historicity] is no longer actual?... some argue that 'doubts about this matter do not deserve one word of rebuttal.'...[E]vidence of 'historical type' gives way to 'psychological' arguments... 'of sympathy': Is it necessary or not, to assume at the origin of all and every religion a historical figure?...[T]he question.. becomes 'placed in parenthesis,' which leads exegetes... to push the Jesus of history back into the shadows while vigorously spotlighting the Jesus of faith."

== Bibliography ==
=== Key works ===
- L'énigme de Jésus (Mercure de France, 1923); transl. Winifred Stephens Whale, The Enigma of Jesus, (Watts, 1924)
- Le mystère de Jésus ("The Mystery of Jesus") (F. Rieder, 1924). No English translation
- La Sagesse Juive: Extraits des livres sapientiaux ("Jewish Wisdom: Excerpts from the Wisdom books") (Payot, 1930)
- Apocalypse (Rieder, 1930); transl. Charles B. Bonner, The Book of Revelation : A Key to Christian Origins, (Watts, 1932)
- Premiers écrits du christianisme ("Early Christian Writings") by G.A. van den Bergh van Eysinga, Robert Stahl, and P.L. Couchoud (F. Rieder, 1930)
- Le problème de Jésus et les origines du christianisme ("The Problem of Jesus and the Origins of Christianity"), by Prosper Alfaric, P.L. Couchoud, Albert Bayet, (1932)
- Jésus : Le Dieu fait homme ("God made man"), (Rieder, 1937); transl. Charles B. Bonner, The Creation of Christ: An Outline of the Beginnings of Christianity (2 vol., Watts, 1939) vol. 1 and vol. 2.

=== Other works ===
- Benoit de Spinoza (Thesis, Alcan, 1902; 2nd ed. 1924)
- Au fil de l'eau (Along the Waterways); followed by Haïkaïs: the first French haïku, 1905–1922 (re-ed., Éric Dussert; 2011)
- Sages and Poets of Asia (Calmann-Levy, 1916, 4th ed. 1923)
- Japanese Impressions, with a note on Confucius (transl. Frances Rumsey, John Lane, 1921)
- La Vérité sur Jésus: Jésus est-il un Personnage Historique ou un Personnage Légendaire? ("The Truth About Jesus: Is Jesus a Historical Figure of a Legendary Figure?"), a public debate (Conflans-Honorine, 1926)
- L'Evangile de Marc A-t-il Eté Ecrit en Latin? ("Was the Gospel of Mark Written in Latin?" 1926). German trans. Frans-Joris Fabri, Das Markusevangelium Ist in Lateinischer Sprache Verfasst Worden (2007); Klaus Schilling's English summary
- Jubilé Alfred Loisy (Paris 1927), by P.L. Couchoud & Alfred Firmin Loisy. Congrès d'histoire du christianisme. (Published under direction of P.-L. Couchoud, Rieder, 1928)
- La Première Edition de St Paul ("The First Edition of St. Paul"), (1928). German trans. Frans-Joris Fabri, Die Erstausgabe der Paulusbriefe (2001). English trans. Frans-Joris Fabri and Michael Conley The First Edition of the Paulina (2002).
- "Jésus Barabbas" (by P.L. Couchoud & R. Stahl), in Premiers écrits du Christianisme (1930), pp. 139–161. German transl. Frans-Joris Fabri, "Jesus Barabbas" (2007)
- "Le Problème de Jésus", Europe, No. 138, June 15, 1934, p. 268-273.
- "Jésus, Dieu ou homme?" ("Jesus: God or Man?"), (NRF, No. 312, Sept. 1, 1939, 26 p.)
- Histoire de Jésus ("History of Jesus") (PUF, 1944)
- Spinoza. Pensées et règles de vie, (J. Haumont, 1944).
- "Hymne à Déméter", transl. (1946)
- Le Dieu Jésus : essai ("The God Jesus: An Essay") (Gallimard, 1951) (excerpts online)
- Une réponse inédite à Loisy sur l'historicité de Jésus ("Response to Loisy on Jesus Historicity") (1970)
