= Lou The French On The Block =

Bakery in California

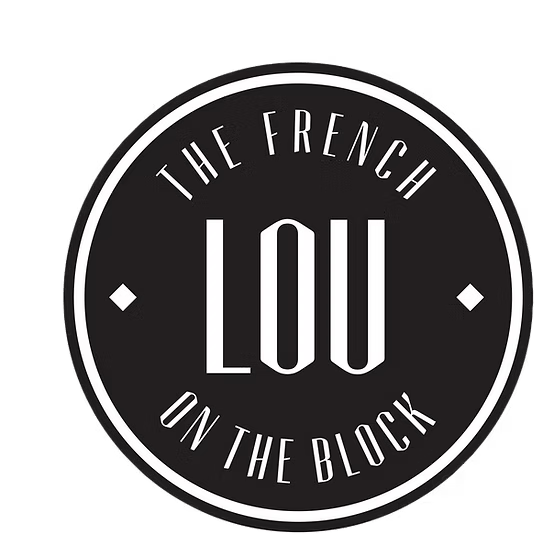

- Location within the Los Angeles metropolitan area Lou The French On The Block (California) Lou The French On The Block (the United States)

Restaurant information
- Established: June 2016
- Head chef: Laurent "Lou" Correa
- Food type: Pastries
- Location: 4007 W Riverside Dr, Burbank, CA 91505
- Coordinates: 34.1520°N 118.3433°W
- Website: www.louthefrenchontheblock.com

Lou The French On The Block is a bakery in Burbank, California. Started in 2016 by former French basketball player Laurent "Lou" Correa, it is known for its croissants. The bakery is only open on Friday, Saturday, and Sunday.

== History ==
Laurent "Lou" Correa was formerly a professional basketball player in France and is of Senegalese descent. He was 6'6" and played small forward for seven years. Lou first experienced French cuisine when he was in boarding school for basketball. He stopped playing basketball due to a hip injury that sidelined his career. He moved to America in June 2012 after winning the green card lottery and, in June 2016, started the bakery with his wife, Karima. Lou was inspired to start baking by watching a chef work, and educated himself by watching YouTube videos. He saved up money by catering for the French parents of children at the International School of Los Angeles.

== Menu ==
The bakery is most well known for its croissants, making them softer and chewier than traditional ones. They also sell tarts, financiers, éclair, Danish patries, quiches, coffee, tea, and sandwiches.
