= Jean Macé =

French teacher, journalist and politician

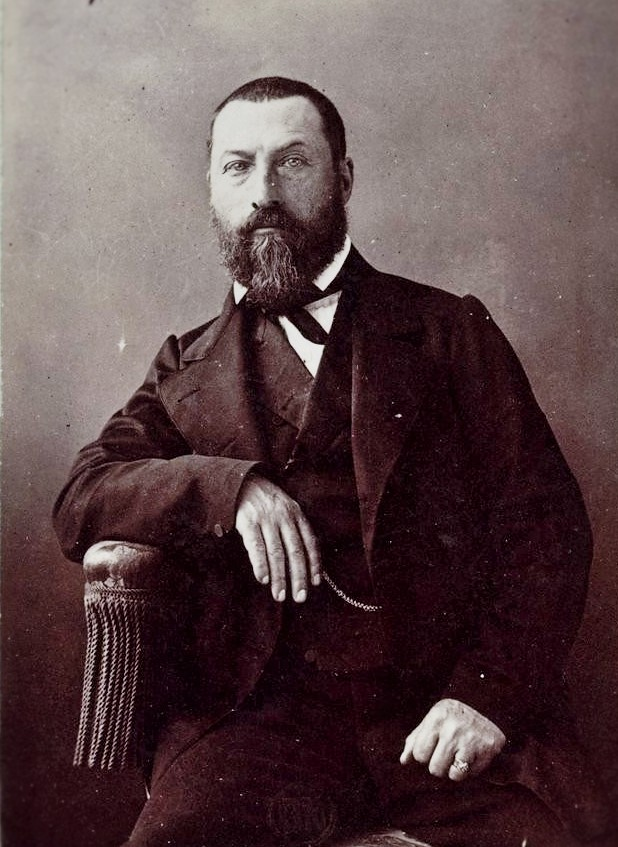

Senator for life
- In office 1883–1894

Personal details
- Born: 22 August 1815 Paris, France
- Died: 13 December 1894 (aged 79) Monthiers, France
- Occupation: educator and journalist
- Awards: Chevalier of the Legion of Honour

Jean François Macé (22 August 1815 in Paris – 13 December 1894 in Monthiers) was a French educator, journalist, active freemason and politician. He was perhaps best known as the founder of Ligue de l'enseignement to promote free, universal and secular education. From 1883 until his death, he was a senator for life in the Third Republic Senate.
