= Albert Bayet =

French sociologist (1880–1961)

Albert Pierre Jules Joseph Bayet (1 February 1880, Lyon – 26 June 1961, Paris) was a French sociologist, professor at both the Sorbonne and the École pratique des hautes études.

== Biography ==
He was the son of Charles Bayet, Byzantine art historian, director of higher education, and the son-in-law of the historian Alphonse Aulard. He graduated in 1901, becoming a professor at the Lycée Louis-le-Grand in 1922. In 1923, he became directory of studies in the « Histoire des idées morales » [ethics] department of the École pratique des hautes études, later leading ethics courses at the Sorbonne.

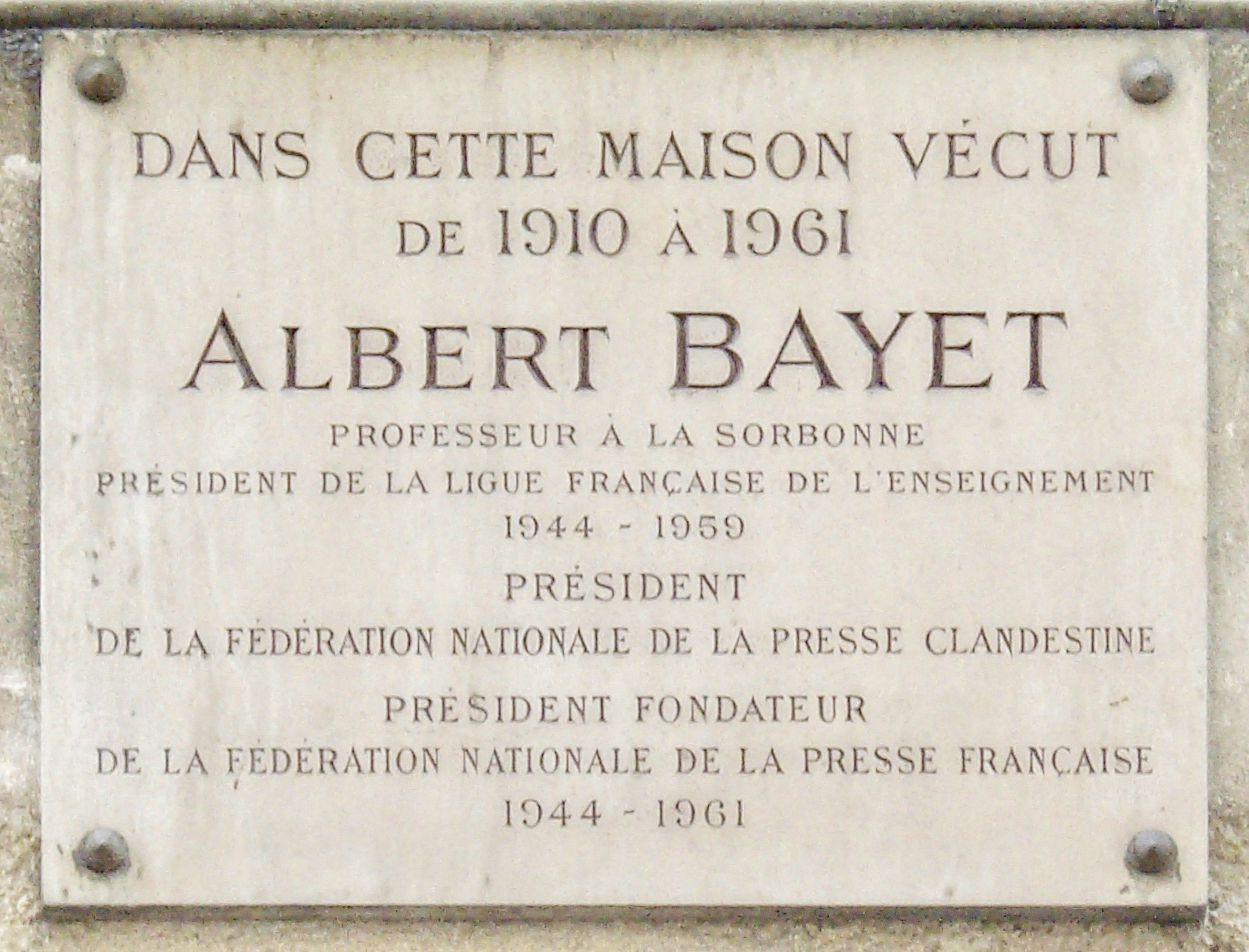
Commemorative plaque on the Parisian home of Albert Bayet, 2 Rue Monsieur-le-Prince

He was the president of the French National Press Federation (FNPF) from 25 August 1944 to his death in 1961. After having been a clandestine president in 1943 and 1944, participating with writer Victor Charbonnel in the journal L'Action. He was also a member of the French Human Rights League for many years, president of the Ligue de l'enseignement from 1949 to 1959, and general secretary of the Union rationaliste. He also took part in those which, shortly after the liberation, left the Radical party to join the Progressive Union, the 'kindred spirit' to the French Communist Party.

Bayet was a proponent of the Christ myth theory. With Paul-Louis Couchoud and Prosper Alfaric, he authored Le Problème de Jésus et les Origines du Christianisme (The Problem of Jesus and Christian Origins, 1932).

== Works ==
- Les Écrivains politiques du XVIIIe, extracts with an introduction and notes by Albert Bayet and François Albert, 1904
- La Morale scientifique, essai sur les applications morales des sciences sociologiques, 1907
- L'Idée de Bien, essai sur le principe de l'art moral rationnel, 1908
- Les Idées mortes, 1908
- Le Mirage de la vertu, 1912
- La Casuistique chrétienne contemporaine, 1913
- Le Suicide et la Morale, 1922; 1975; 2007
- La Science des faites moraux, 1925
- Notre morale, 1926
- Les Morales de l'Évangile, 1927
- Le Livre de morale des écoles primaires. Cours moyen et supérieur, 1928
- Les Provinciales de Pascal, 1929
- Histoire de la morale en France, 2 vol., 1930–1931
- La Morale de la Science, 1931; 1947
- Le Problème de Jésus et les Origines du Christianisme, with Prosper Alfaric et Paul-Louis Couchoud, 1932
- Le Radicalisme, 1932
- Pacifisme et Christianisme aux premiers siècles, 1934
- Attentats et terreur : instruments de conquête politique, Comité Franco-espagnol, brochure, 1937
- Histoire de France, 1938
- Qu'est-ce que le rationalisme ? 1939
- Histoire de la Déclaration des droits de l'homme : du 89 politique au 89 économique, 1939
- Pétain et la Cinquième Colonne, 1944 (publié clandestinement durant l'Occupation)
- Les Pensées de Pascal, 1948
- Pour une réconciliation française. Laïcité XXe, 1958
- Histoire de la libre-pensée, 1959; « Que sais-je ? » 848, 1970
