= Quartier de la Porte-Dauphine =

Coordinates: 48.870086669921875°N 2.273621082305908°E

Porte-Dauphine
- Quartier de la Porte-Dauphine
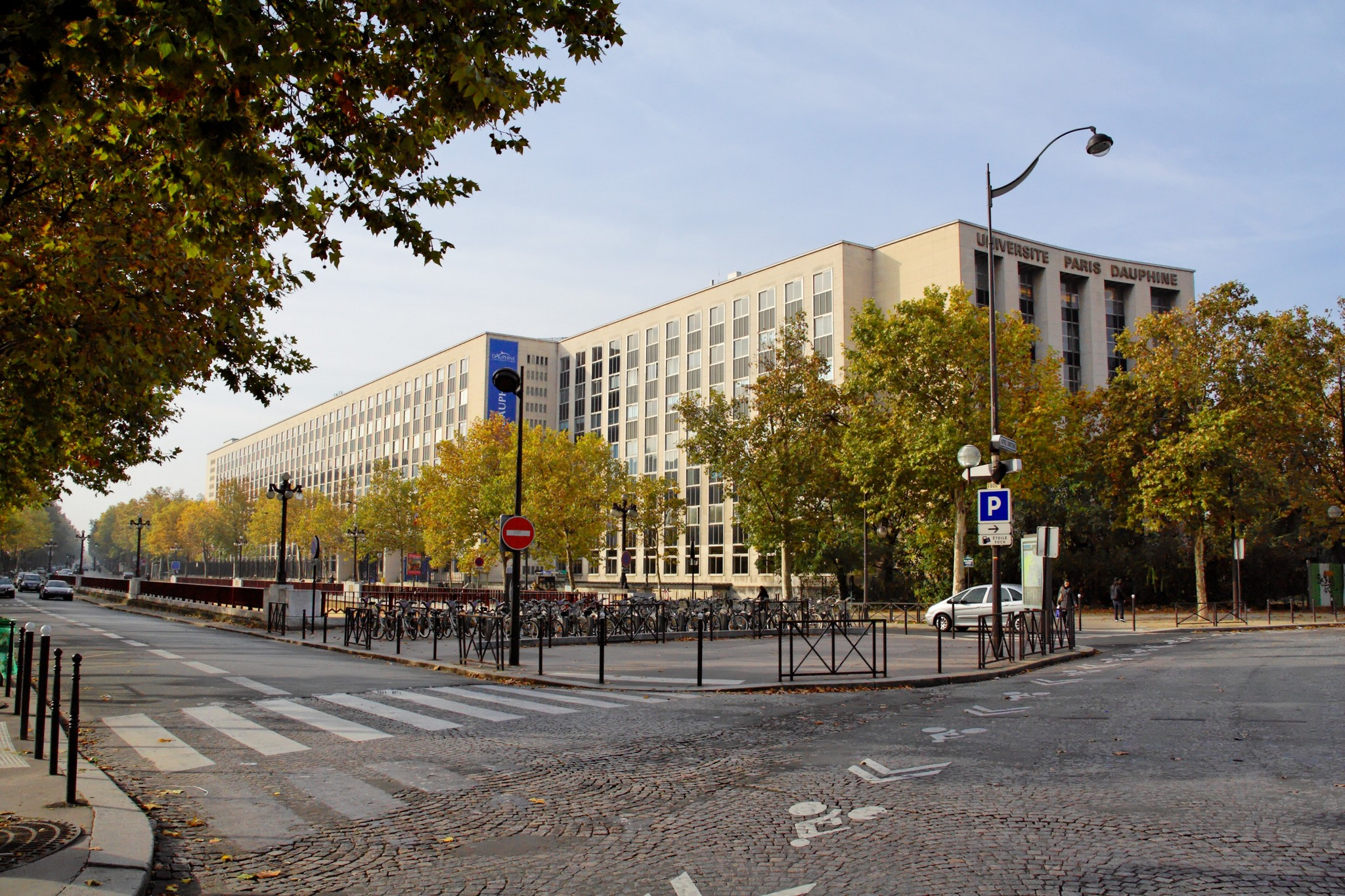
- Paris Dauphine-PSL University
- Interactive map of Porte-Dauphine
- Country: France
- Region: Île-de-France
- Ville: Paris
- Arrondissement: 16th

Area
  - Total: 1.414 km^{2} (0.546 sq mi)

Population (2016)
  - Total: 22,774
  - Density: 16,106/km^{2} (41,710/sq mi)

The Quartier de la Porte-Dauphine is the 63rd of the 80 quarters of Paris, located in the 16th arrondissement.

The Quarters of the 16th arrondissement

== Location ==
The administrative district in the 16th arrondissement of Paris is bounded by the following streets:

- West and North: The border with the Hauts-de-Seine department
- East: Avenue de Malakoff, Avenue Raymond Poincaré, extending to the Place du Trocadéro
- South: Avenue Georges Mandel, Avenue Henri-Martin
- Southeast: Route de la Muette, Route de Longchamp (at the end of the lakes), and Route des lacs

== Origin of the name ==
The district takes its name from the Porte Dauphine (French for "Dauphin Gate"), which is located in the middle of the Place du Maréchal de Lattre de Tassigny and symbolizes the gateway to the Bois de Boulogne.

== History ==
=== The Area Before Settlement ===
The present-day district is situated in the northwest, on the site of a former settlement on the Colline de Chaillot. No traces of this settlement remain; it was likely located in the area now occupied by the Rue de Chaillot, Rue Quentin-Bauchart, and Avenue Pierre Ier de Serbie. In 1659, the area was established as a Parisian suburb under the name "Faubourg de la Conférence", and in 1787, it was incorporated into the city following the construction of the Wall of the Fermiers généraux. The terrain, which slopes gently toward the Bois de Boulogne, was initially known as the "Plaine de Chaillot" and later as the "Plaine de Passy"; legally, it remained under the jurisdiction of the Abbey of Saint-Denis until 1789. Until the 19th century, the land was used primarily for agriculture—specifically viticulture. The name of the street "Rue des Belles Feuilles" still serves as a reminder of this heritage.

=== Settlement of the district ===
The Société des terrains de la plaine de Passy began surveying and developing the area in 1825.

When the Thiers fortifications were constructed in 1842—a project that also led to the separation of the Bois de Boulogne—the future neighborhood remained almost entirely undeveloped. Its boundaries were subsequently established in 1860, upon the incorporation of Passy into the 16th arrondissement.

The Quartier de la Porte-Dauphine largely took shape between 1872 and 1911, a period that saw the construction of luxury apartment buildings, magnificent private mansions, and elegant detached houses—some of which are located on private streets.

=== The neighborhood today ===
There are few houses in this neighborhood dating from before 1840. Many buildings reflect the style of the Haussmann-era transformation of Paris—both from the Second Empire and the subsequent period (1871–1914). Over time, some grand private residences were demolished and replaced by apartment blocks. Of those that remain, many are now used as office buildings; only a few still serve as prestigious private residences.

The neighborhood features a relatively large number of private lanes, including Square de l’Avenue Foch, Villa Saïd, Villa Dupont, Villa Spontini, Rue de Pomereu, and Avenue de Montespan.

This upscale residential area also houses numerous embassies and administrative headquarters—particularly around Place Victor Hugo, which serves as a rather lively hub.

== Sightseeing features ==
Exceptional Private Homes

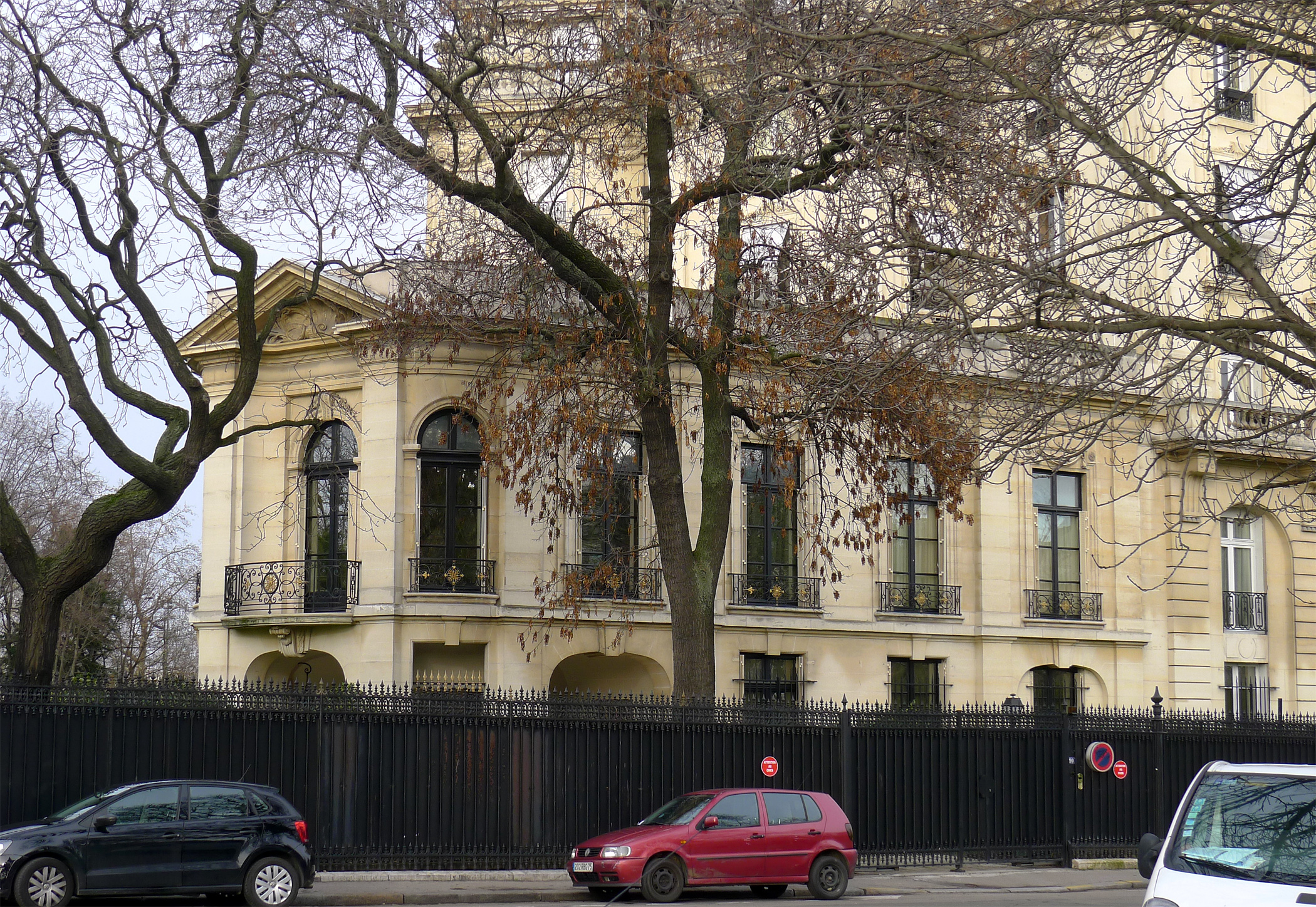
90, Avenue Foch: House of the industrialist Louis Renault

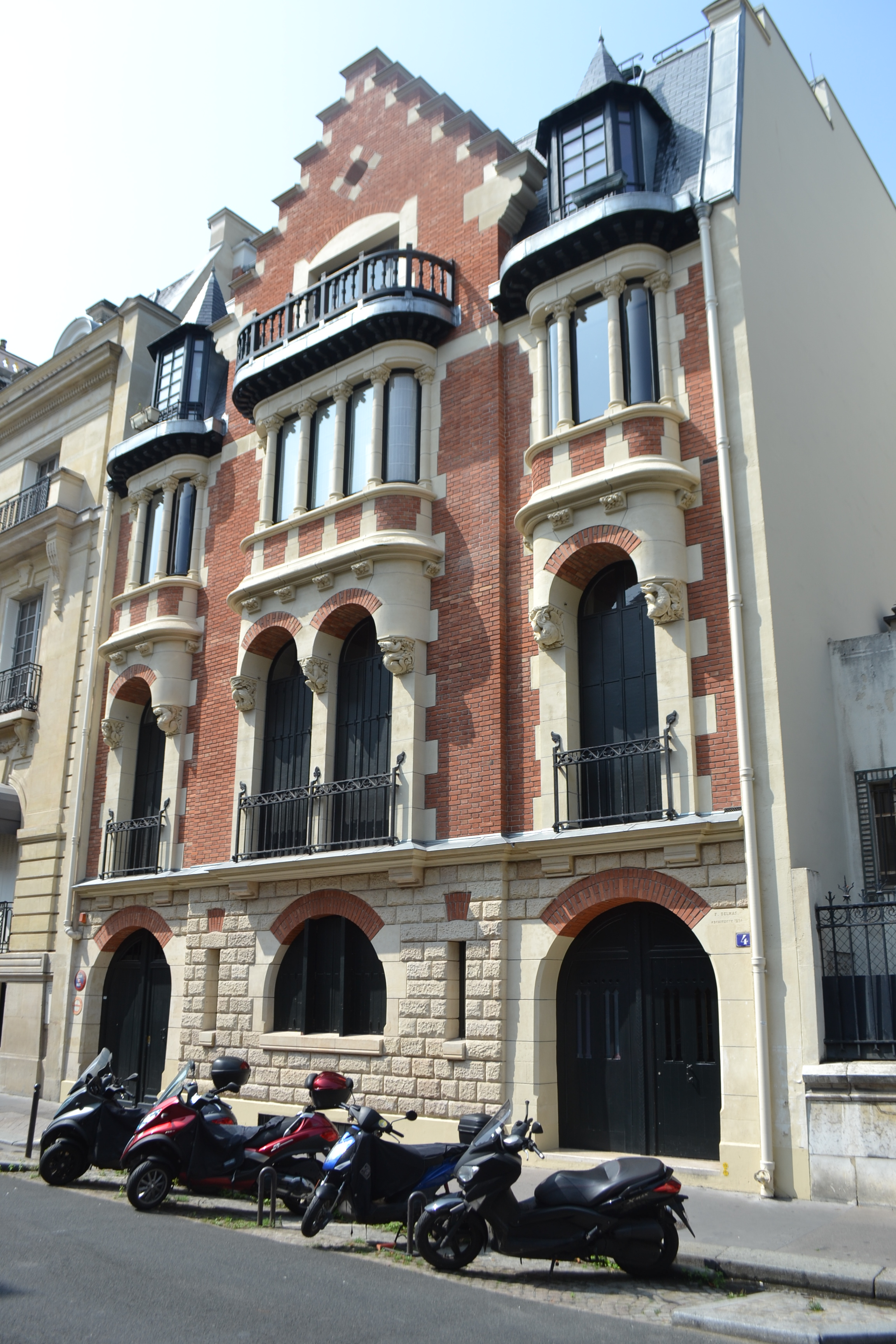
4, Rue de Lota

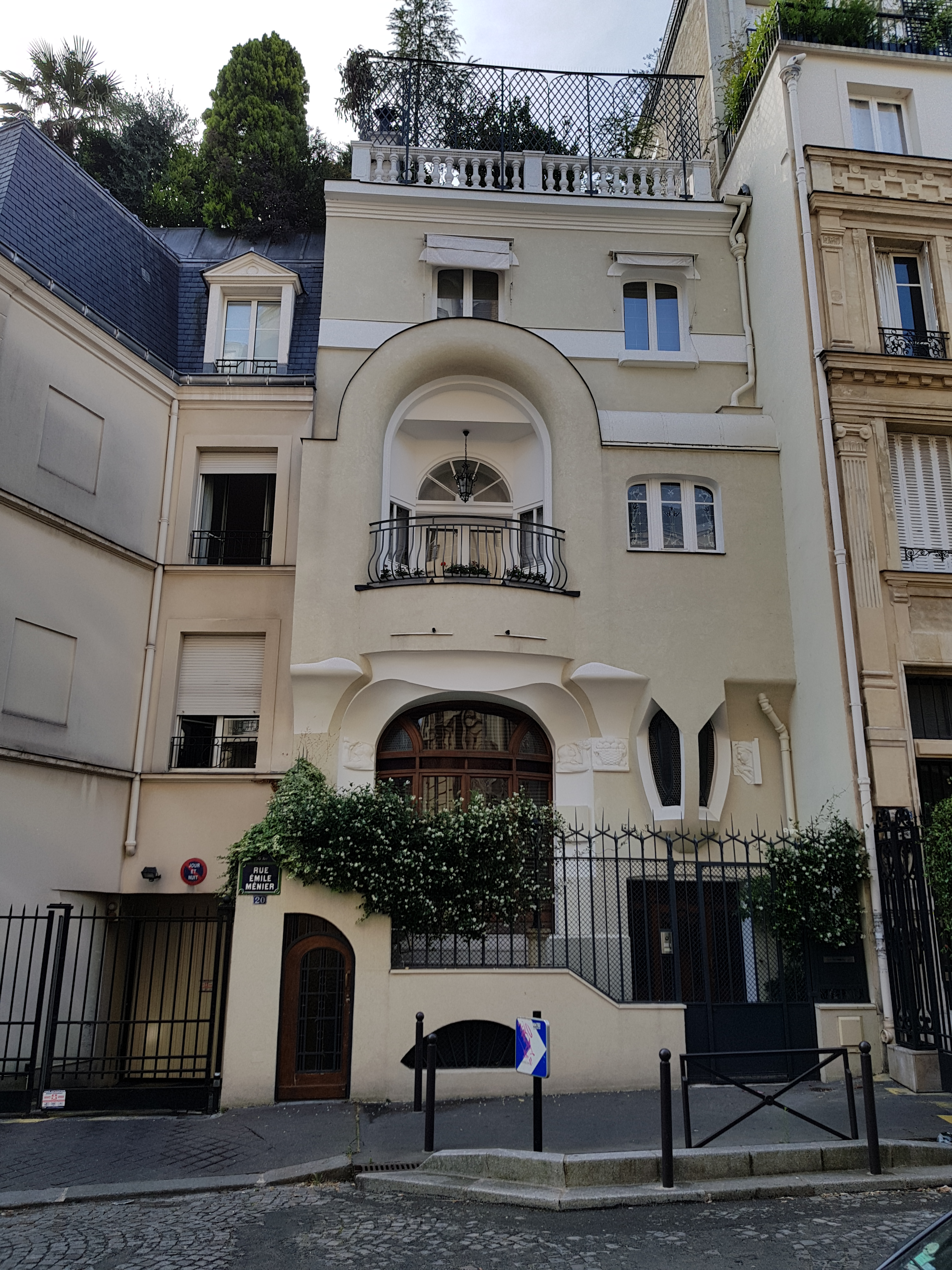
20, Rue Émile-Menier

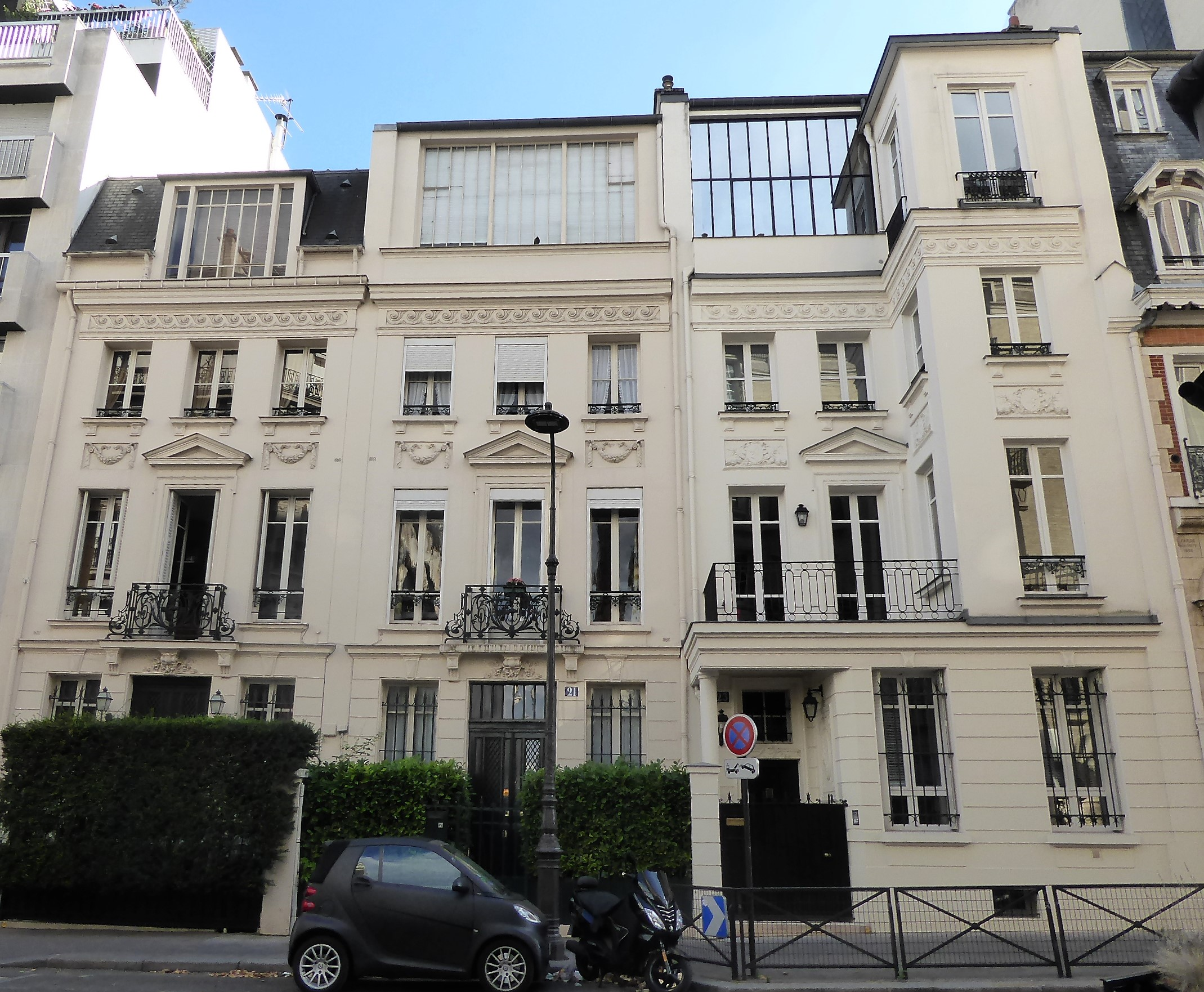
21, Rue Dufrenoy: Houses in a neo-classical English style

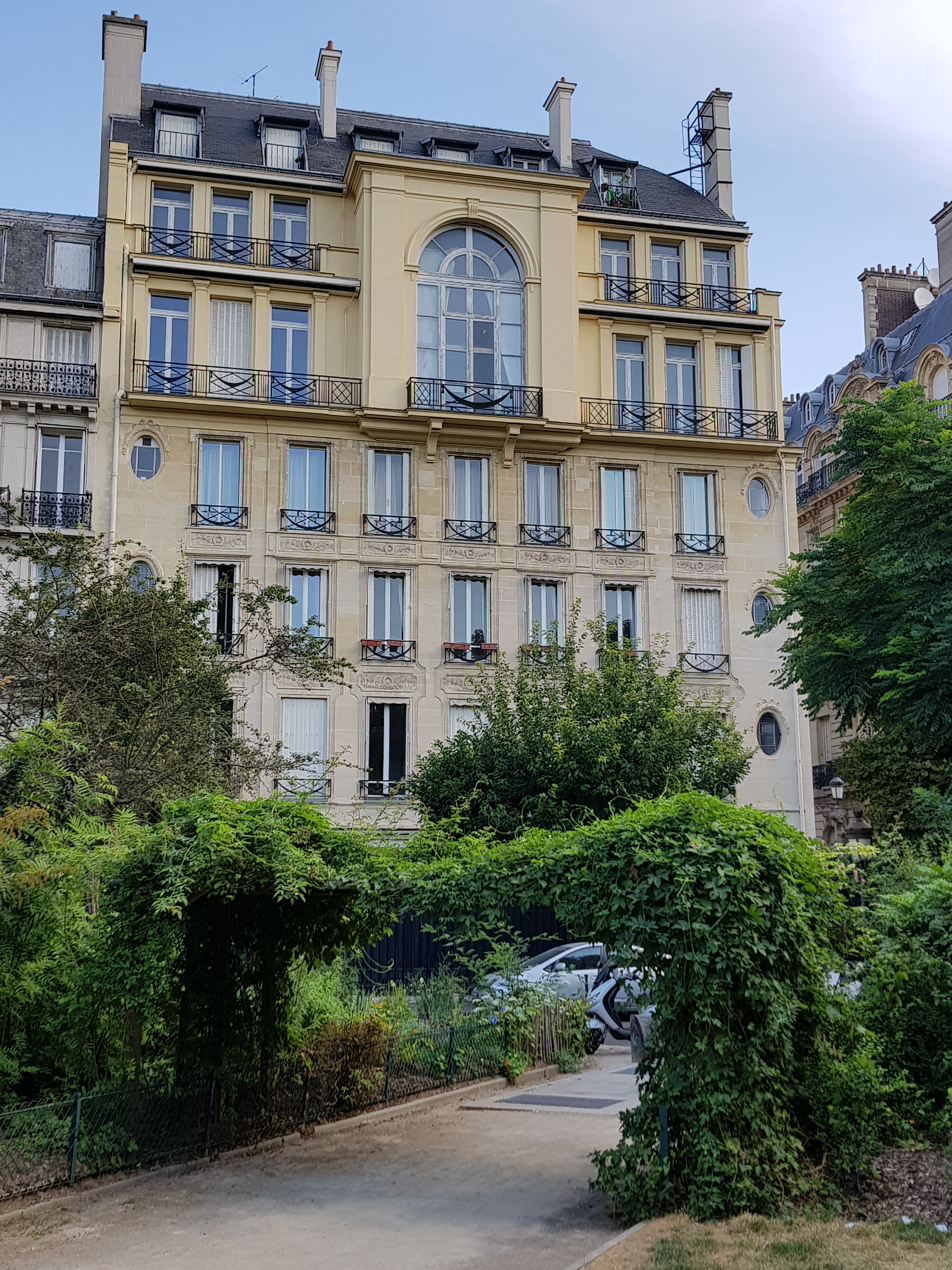
82, Avenue Foch

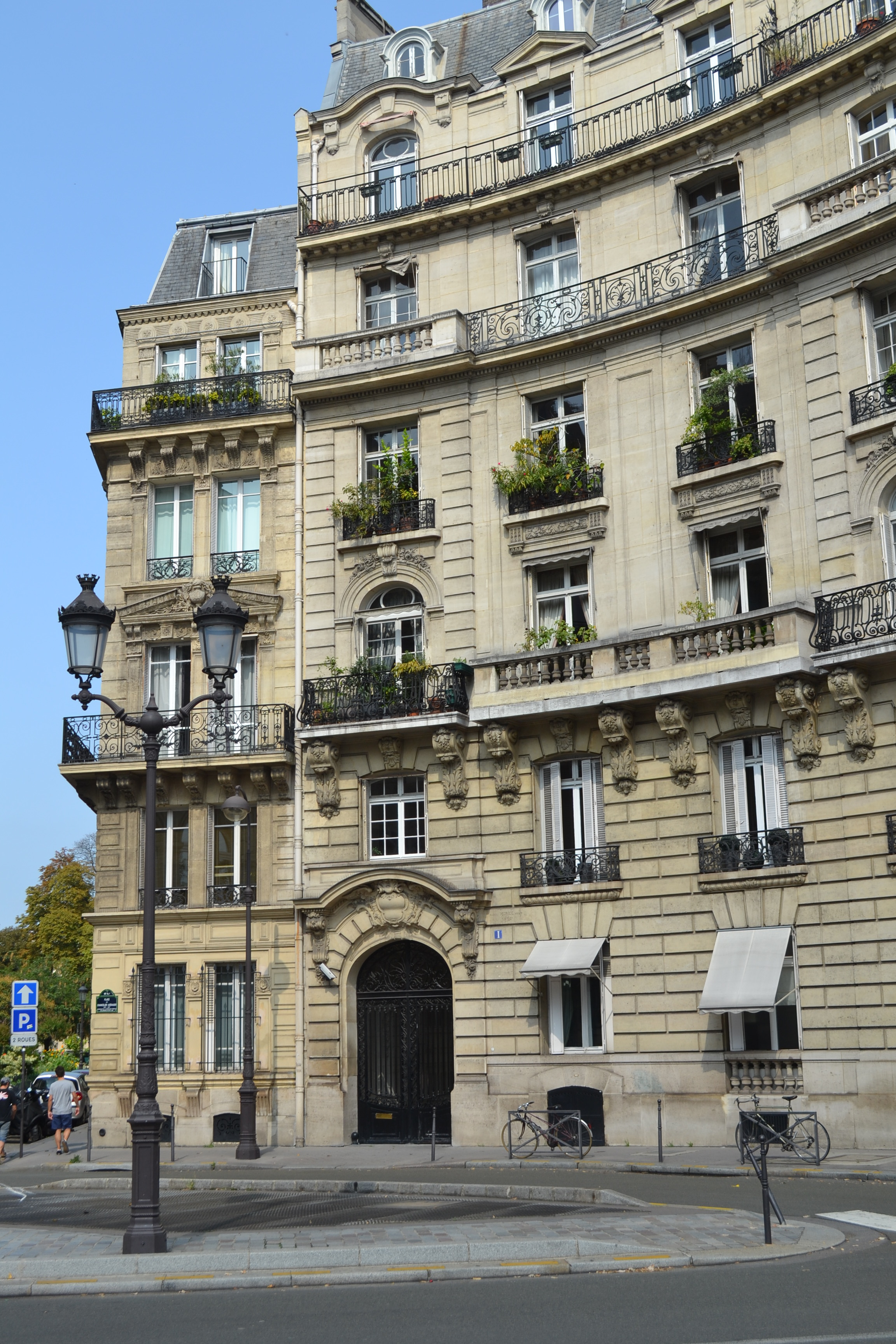
1, Place du Chancelier-Adenauer

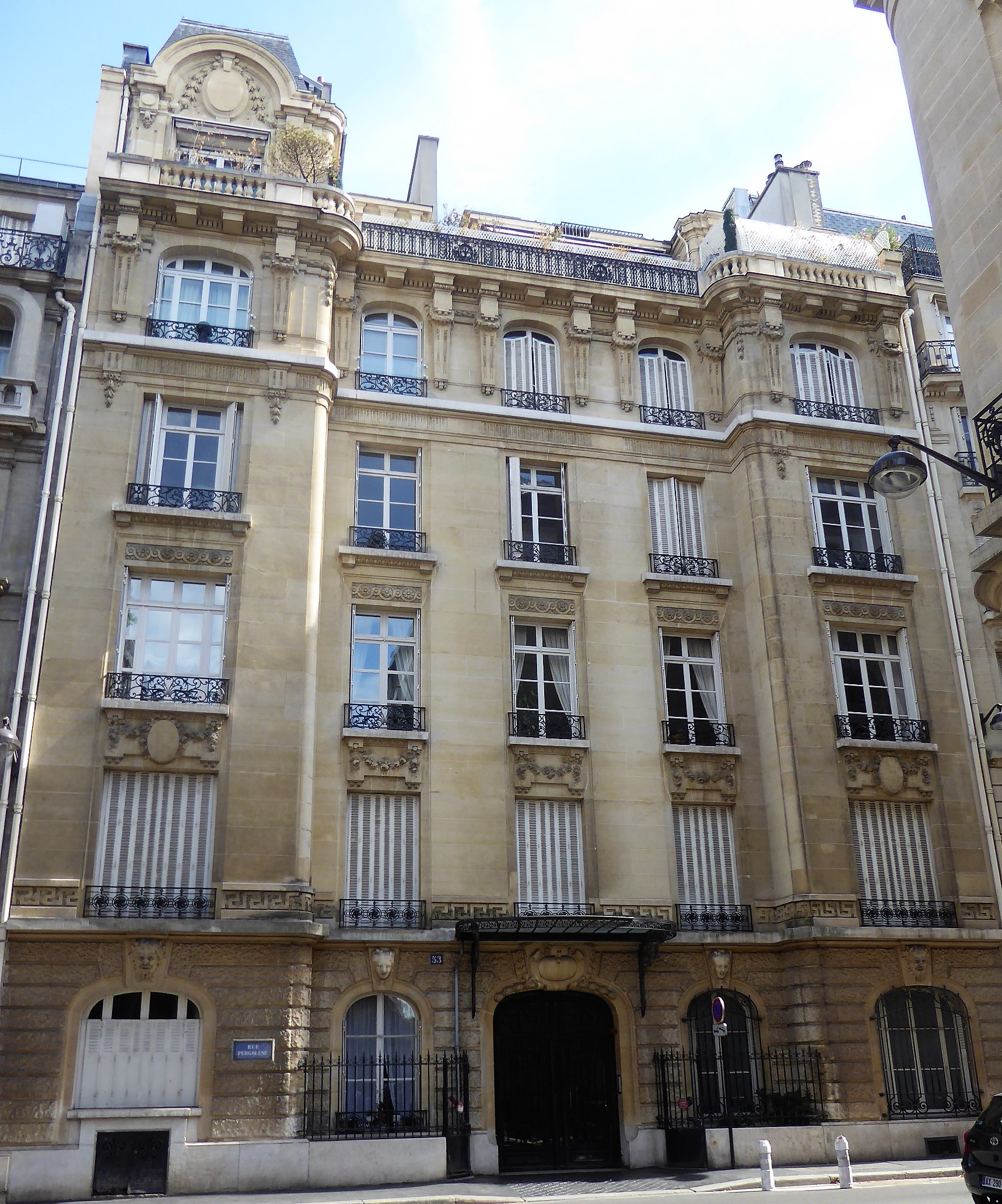
53, Rue Pergolèse: Building in the Neoclassical style

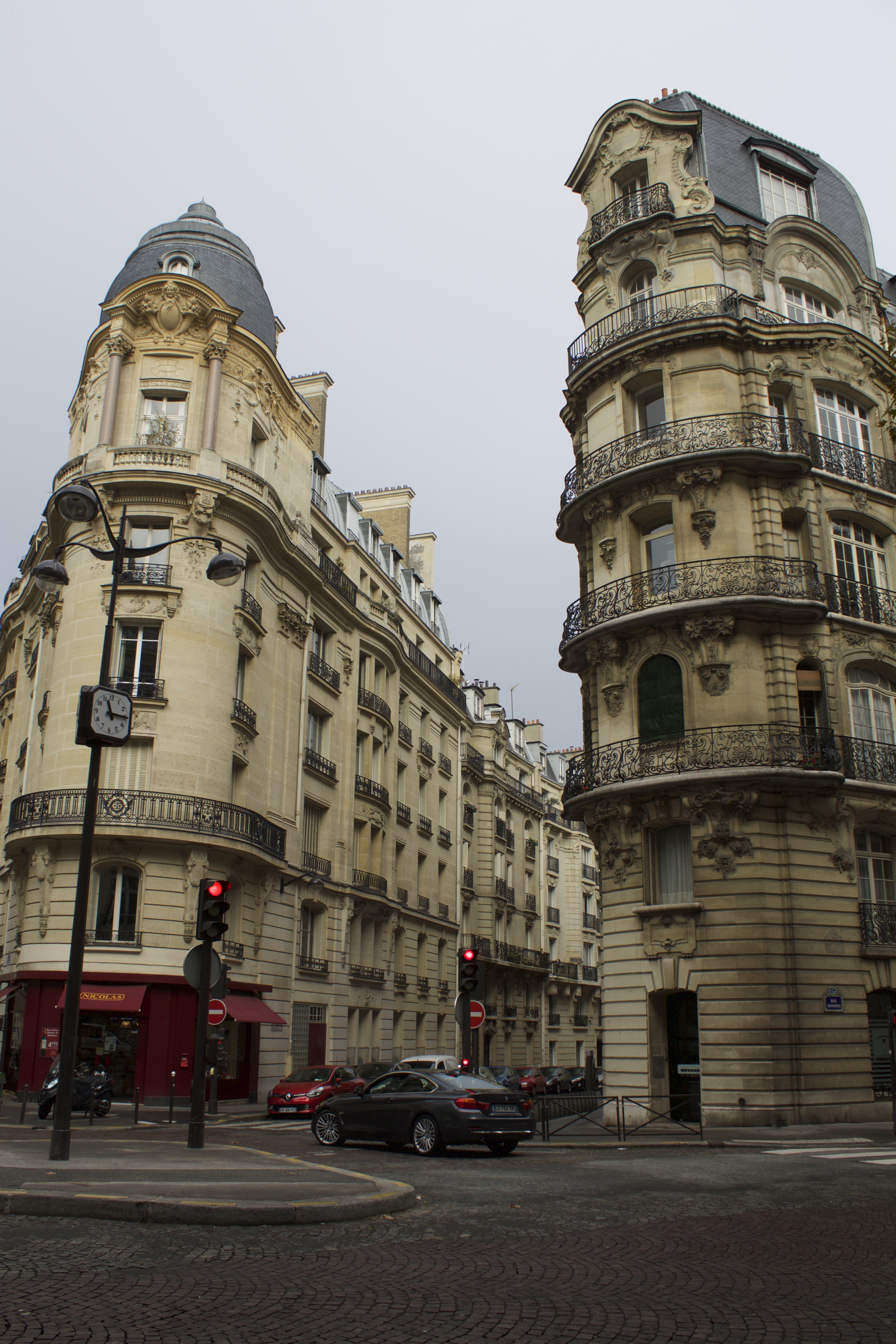
Rue Benjamin Godard and Rue Spontini
Private roads

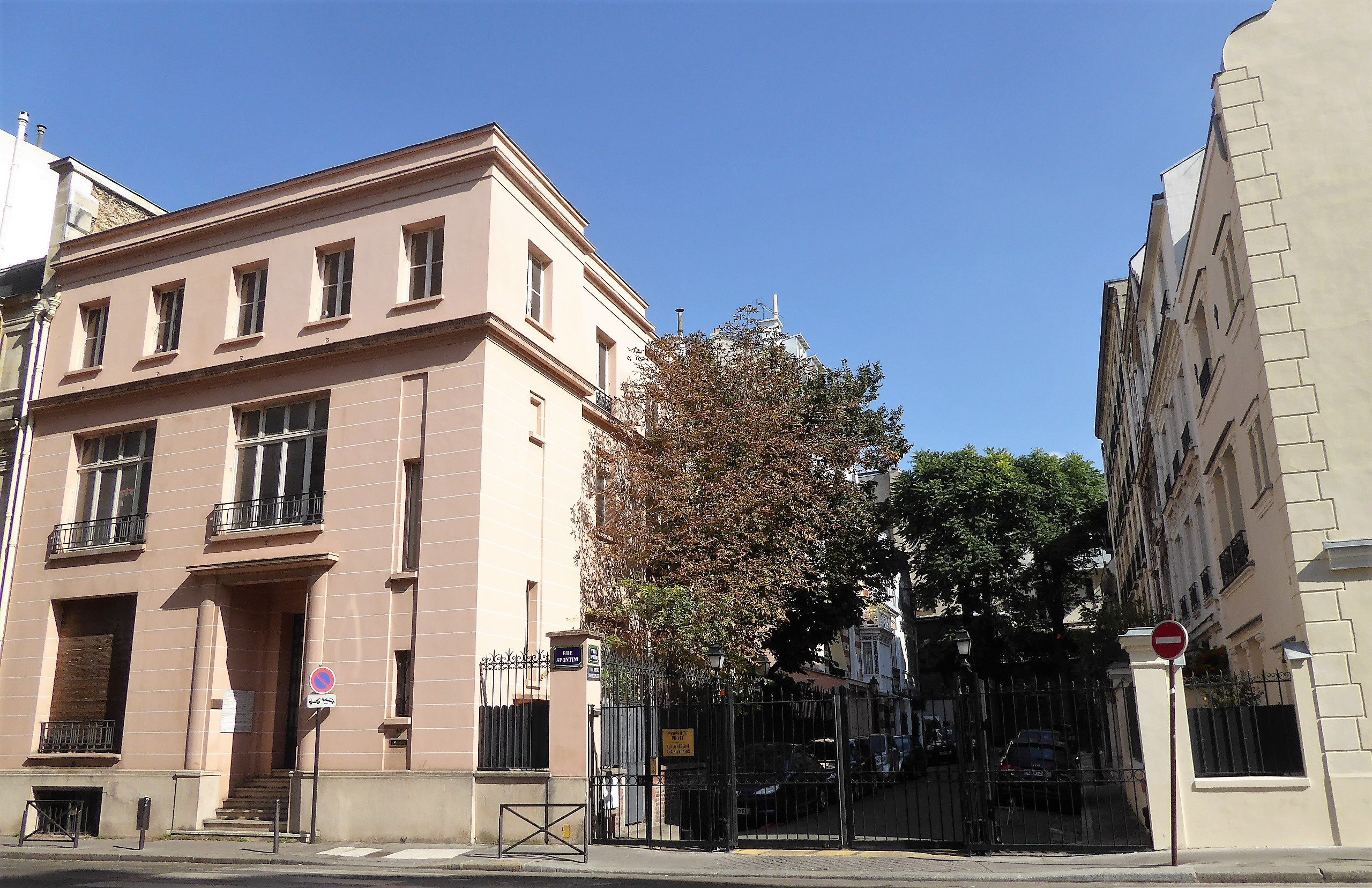
Villa Spontini

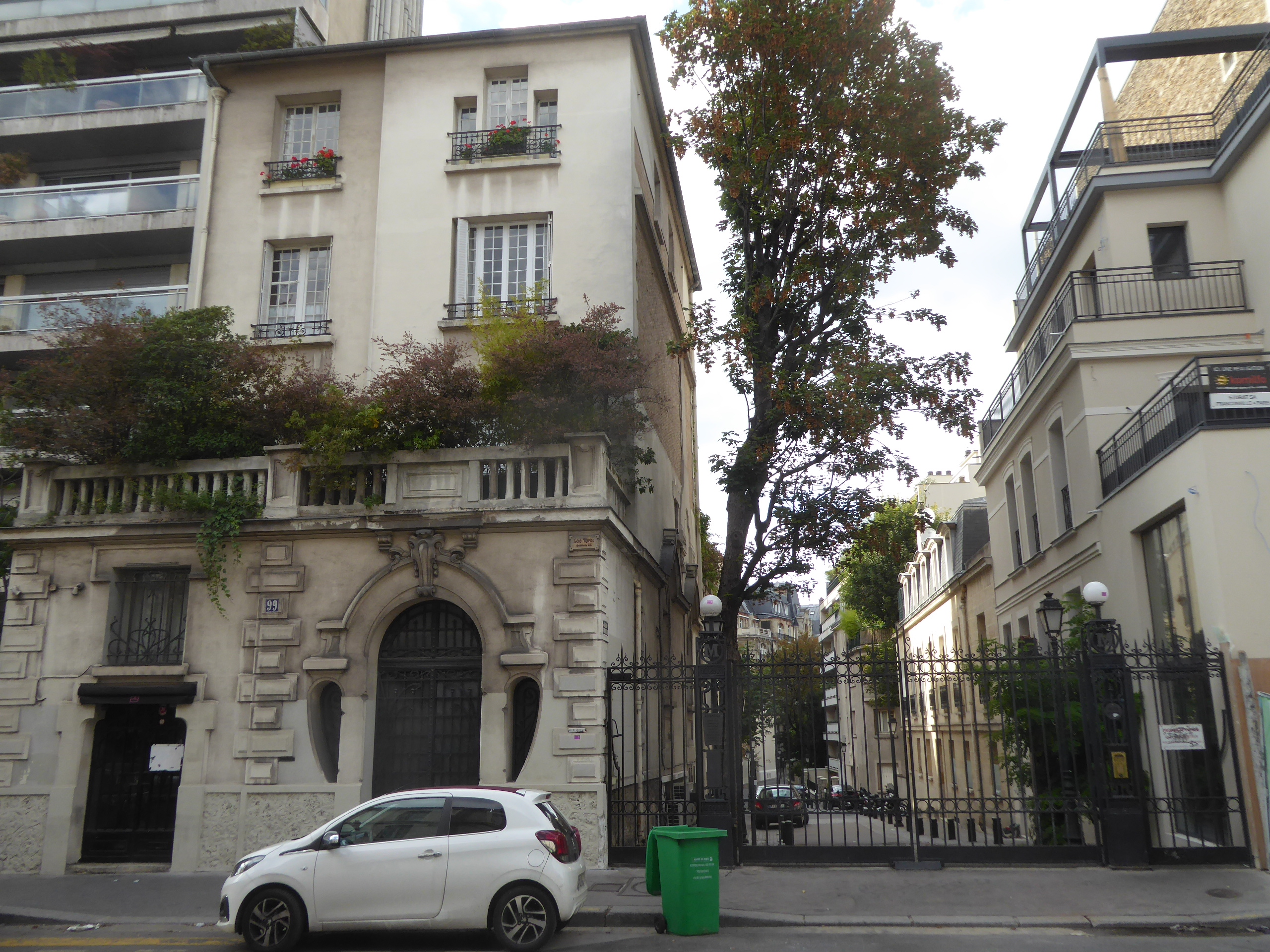
Avenue de Montespan

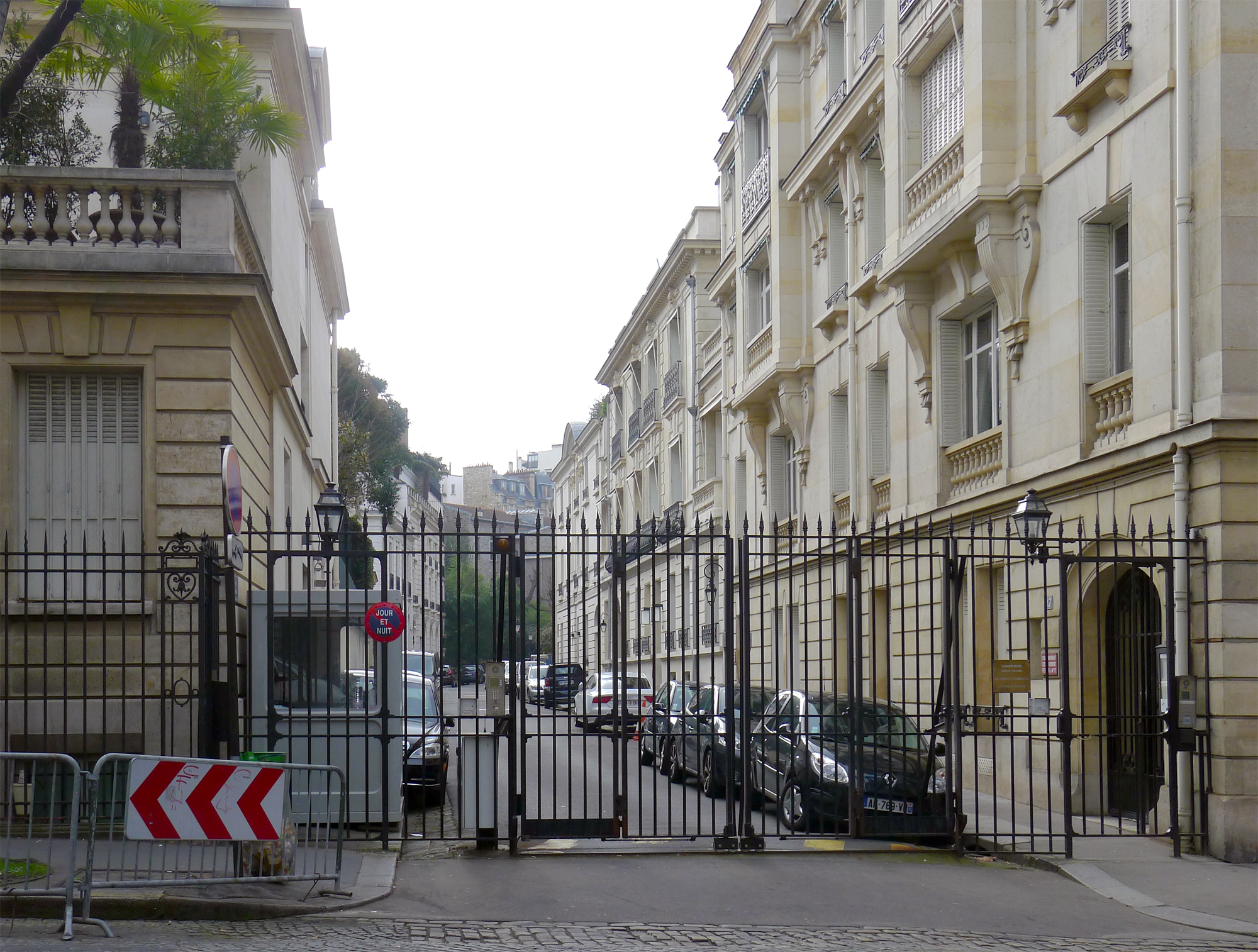
Rue Dosne

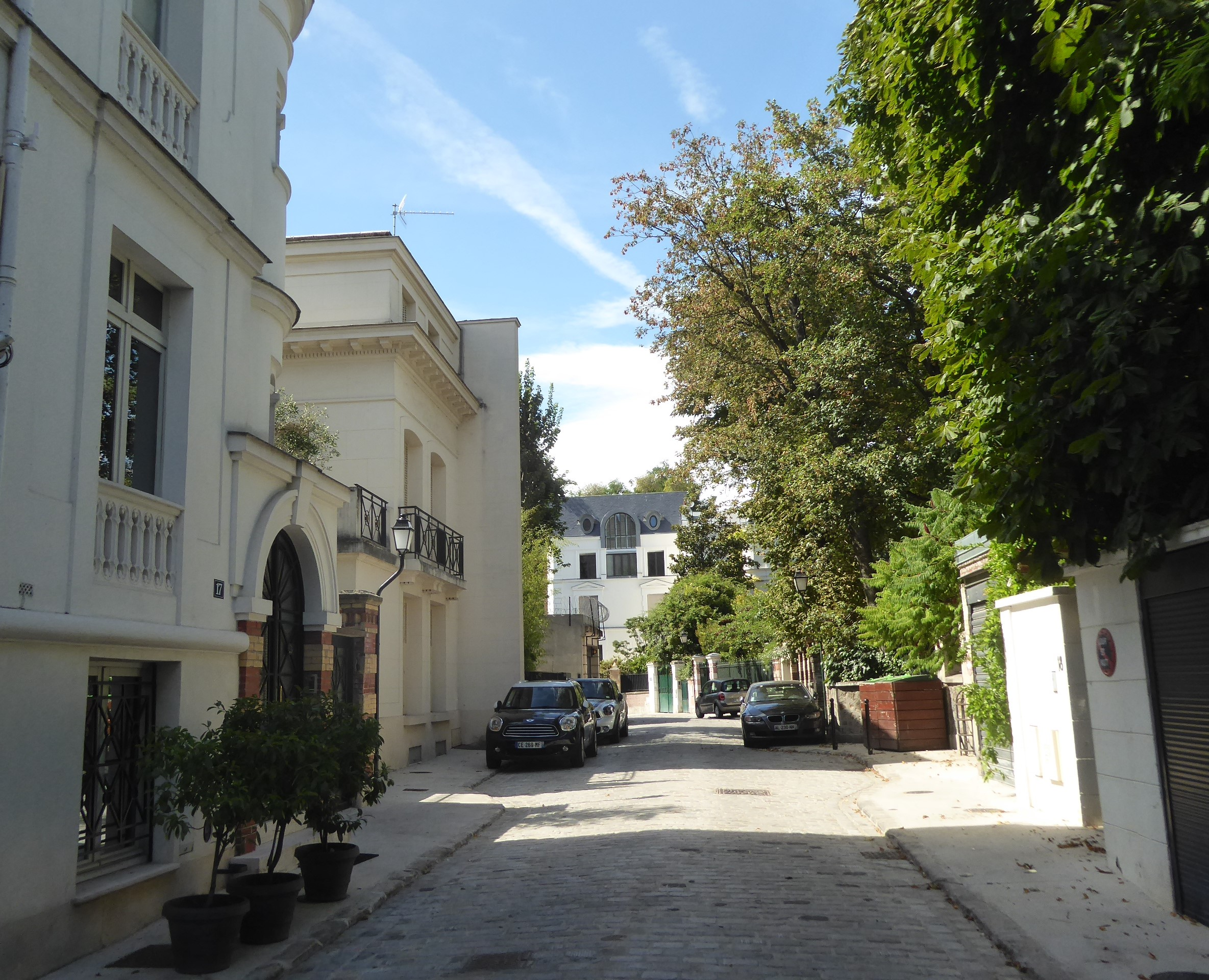
Villa Dupont
