= International School of Los Angeles =

Coordinates: 34.159756°N 118.31311°W

Location
- 1105 W. Riverside Drive; Burbank, California

Information
- Type: International school
- Motto: Speak & think globally
- Established: 1978; 48 years ago
- Founders: Monique Mickus, Jacques Gaspart and Pierrette Gaspart
- Head of school: Conrad Hughes
- Staff: ~200 (full-time)
- Teaching staff: ~130
- Gender: Coeducational
- Age range: 4-18
- Enrolment: 1,032 (2021)
- Student to teacher ratio: 8:1
- Colors: Blue and white
- Mascot: Lion
- Nickname: LILA Lions
- Rival: Lycée Français de Los Angeles
- Newspaper: The LILA Gazette
- Website: https://www.internationalschool.la/

The International School of Los Angeles (French: Lycée International de Los Angeles, LILA) is a private, international school for students aged 4 to 18. The International School of Los Angeles holds accreditation by the French Ministry of Education, the Western Association of Schools and Colleges, and the International Baccalaureate.

== History ==
Established in 1978, The school was initially called the College d'Etudes Françaises (CEF) and then the Lycée International de Los Angeles (LILA). In September 2015, the School officially changed its name to the International School of Los Angeles. Since the original founders (Monique Mickus, Jacques & Pierrette Gaspart) had French backgrounds, they chose the French educational system as the foundation for the School's curriculum. Mme Christiane Bayet, mother of Monique Mickus, who was on the original Board of Trustees for the school and an educator herself, taught French, Latin and Philosophy when the school first opened.

Co-founder Monique Mickus came from a long line of educators and was one of the first teachers when the school opened. Her great-grandfather, French historian and author Alphonse Aulard (1849-1928), held the chair of Professor of History of the French Revolution at the Sorbonne. He was also a co-founder of the Ligue des droits de l'homme and was president of the Mission Laïque from 1906 to 1912. Her grandfather, Albert Bayet (1880-1961) was Professor of Sociology at the Sorbonne and at the École pratique des hautes études. He too was a member of the Ligue des droits de l'homme and was president of the Ligue de l'enseignement from 1949 to 1959. He was president of the Fédération nationale de la presse libre during World War II and president of the Fédération nationale de la presse française following the war.

Initially, the School had five students. They were the co-founders' children: Catherine Mickus, Elizabeth Mickus, Francis Mickus, Guylaine Gaspart, and Christelle Gaspart. By 1990, the student body had increased to 225 on three campuses. By 2001, there were 650 students on five campuses.

== Campuses ==
The school has five campuses: a nursery in the Los Feliz area, a primary school in Pasadena, a primary school in the West Valley area, a primary school in the Los Feliz area, and a secondary school in the Burbank area. Upon graduation from the primary schools, students from the Los Feliz, Pasadena and West Valley primary campuses move to the Burbank campus to begin their secondary education.

A central administrative office is located on the Burbank campus.

=== Los Feliz (primary school campus) ===
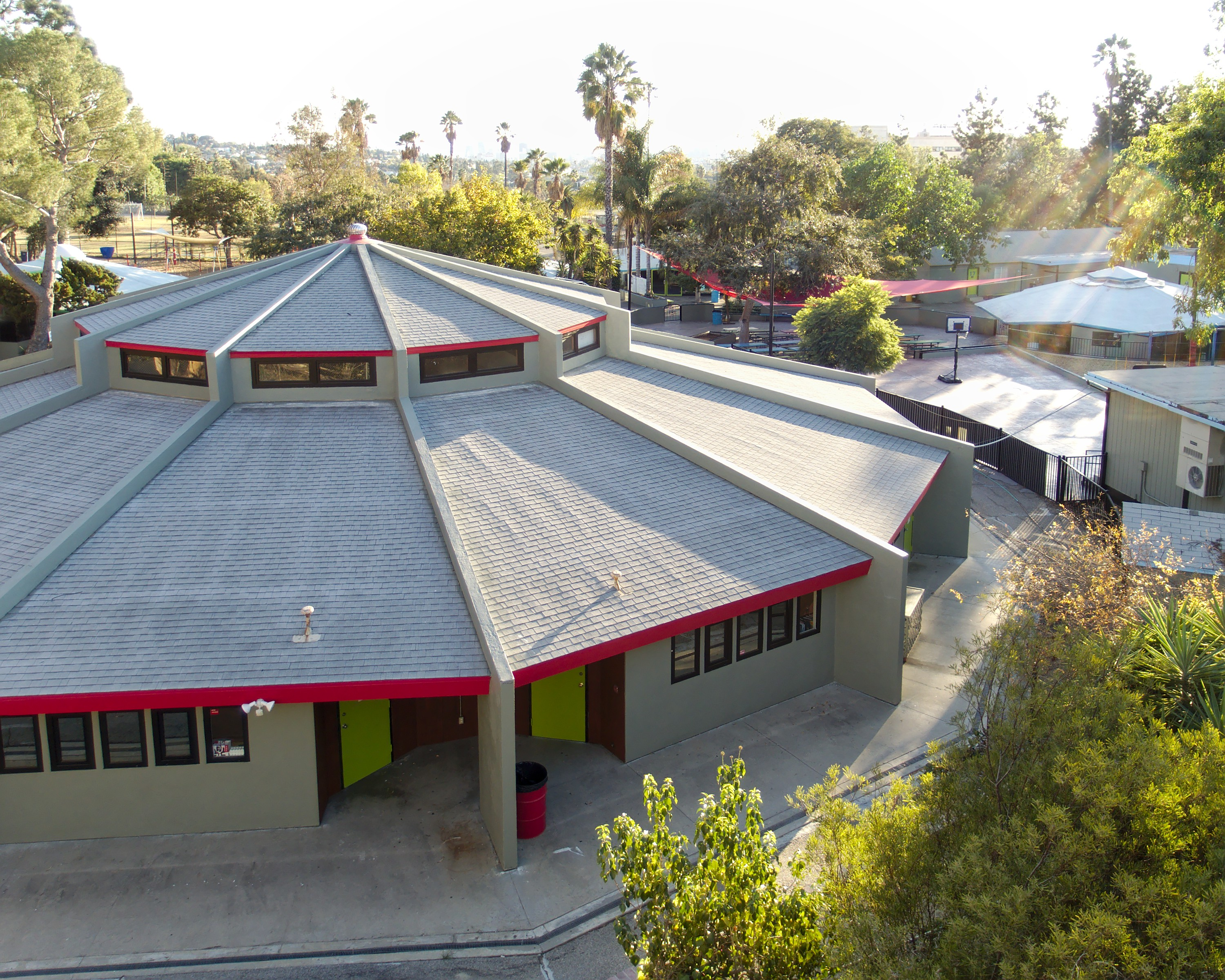
Original Midtown School buildings

The largest of the five, this campus is a Los Angeles Historic-Cultural Monument and is the only school designed by noted architect John Lautner. Constructed in 1960 in the International Modern style, the four separate pavilion classrooms feature a low scale to suit children. The campus is located in the Franklin Hills section of LA. The campus is located on six acres. The permanent Lautner structures and other additions are used as offices, classrooms, science labs, art rooms, a multipurpose room, computer labs, and a teachers' lounge. The library sits in the middle of the largest building. Several modular classrooms have been added to the campus. There is a large field used for football and other sports, and several play areas.

=== Pasadena (primary school campus) ===
The Pasadena campus is located across from Pasadena City College. It consists of a two-story building with 11 classrooms, a dual-language library, a computer lab used for student research and didactic exercises, and dedicated outside dining and play areas. A separate multipurpose room serves as a versatile venue for music classes, indoor extra-curricular activities and special meetings, while an auditorium invites larger group activities, such as student performances, workshops, etc.

=== West Valley (primary school campus) ===
The West Valley Campus consists of three permanent buildings and two additional modular buildings, one of which houses a library. The other modular building is home to a computer lab with 22 computers and a small, indoor gymnasium. The permanent buildings have high ceilings.

=== Burbank (secondary school campus) ===
Opened in August 2013, the Burbank campus is located in the Equestrian district, perhaps the most famous neighborhood in Burbank due to its equestrian zoning, numerous parks, open space, connections to riding trails. The campus is on Riverside Drive, the area's high street, lined with sycamore and oak trees. The one-story building was built in the 1960s by General Motors Corporation for training purposes. The campus houses 23 classrooms, four labs, an auditorium, an art room, an indoor sports room, two outdoor volleyball courts and basketball courts. School buses shuttle students between the Burbank campus and the three Los Angeles-area primary school campuses.

=== Former campuses ===
LILA previously served San Gabriel Valley families with a Kindergarten through grade 6 campus on the property of the United Methodist Church in Monrovia. This campus, using classrooms formerly used by a church daycare, opened was scheduled to open on September 11, 1990. It moved to Pasadena in July 2006.

The School previously had a Woodland Hills campus, which had over 140 students as of 2001. This was in a public school building, rented from the Los Angeles Unified School District. In 2001 LAUSD announced that it would not renew the lease.

The school previously had Orange County campuses in Huntington Beach, Fountain Valley, and Orange. The Orange campus had 75 students in 2001. In September 2005 the school moved to Santa Ana.

== Sport ==
Rugby 7s, association football, basketball, tennis, volleyball, track and field and fencing are all sports played at the school.

== Academics ==
The International School of Los Angeles follows the French Ministry of Education's academic program in a bilingual context. Besides the scientifically proven benefits of bilingualism, the School aims to gift students with the value of a constructivist education where students are actively involved in a process of meaning and knowledge construction. The International School of Los Angeles teaches a bilingual program culminating in the French Baccalauréat or the International Baccalaureate Diploma. Students are taught to read, write, and speak both languages by the end of their primary education. Satisfying both the Core Standards and the French Ministry of Education's requirements necessitates a rigorous schedule; the percentage of each language of instruction varies at each grade level.

The school specifically avoids dividing students based upon their dominant language. At the very foundation of the educational program is a policy of integration.

The academic program is based on a bicultural program which results in a French Baccalaureate and/or an International Baccalaureate IB Diploma Programme. Students are taught to speak, read, and write both French and English, but can additionally learn other languages. The school also offers the French Brevet des collèges (100% success rate). The School further requires all its secondary students to fulfil 150 hours of community service as part of their roles as world citizens.

In 2015, the Washington Post placed the International School of Los Angeles 11th in its most challenging private high schools in the US.

Because the school's students, teachers and staff come from many nations (over 50 nationalities are represented on the five campuses, with 39 languages spoken at home) the concept that we are all citizens of one world are emphasised. Small, nurturing classes and small student-to-teacher ratios facilitate this.

Graduates of the International School of Los Angeles are accepted to universities internationally, among them: Harvard University, Princeton University, Columbia University, Stanford University, University of Oxford, University of Cambridge, University of Edinburgh, McGill University, Dartmouth College, Brown University, University of Paris and Sciences Po.
