= The Gods Are Athirst =

1912 novel by Anatole France

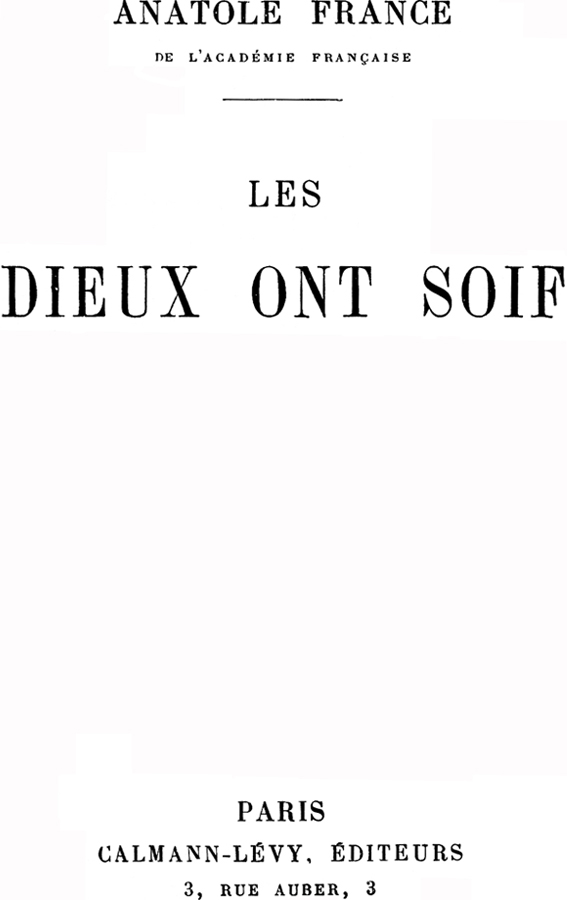
- First edition, 1912
- Author: Anatole France
- Original title: Les dieux ont soif
- Language: French
- Genre: Historical novel
- Published: 1912
- Publication place: France

The Gods Are Athirst (French: Les dieux ont soif, also translated as The Gods Are Thirsty or The Gods Will Have Blood) is a 1912 novel by Anatole France. It is set in Paris in 1793–1794, closely tied to specific events of the French Revolution.

== Plot ==
The story of the rise of Évariste Gamelin, a young Parisian painter, involved in the local government for his neighborhood of Pont-Neuf, The Gods Are Athirst describes the dark years of the Reign of Terror in Paris, from Year II to Year III. Fiercely Jacobin, Marat and Robespierre's most faithful adherent, Évariste Gamelin becomes a juror on the Revolutionary Tribunal.

The long, blind train of speedy trials drags this idealist into a madness that cuts off the heads of his nearest and dearest, and hastens his own fall as well as that of his idol Robespierre in the aftermath of the Thermidorian Reaction. His love affair with the young watercolor-seller Élodie Blaise heightens the terrible contrast between the butcher-in-training and the man who shows himself to be quite ordinary in his daily life.

Justifying this dance of the guillotine by the fight against the plot to wipe out the gains of the Revolution, in the midst of the revolutionary turmoil that traverses Paris, Gamelin is thirsty for justice, but also uses his power to satisfy his own vengeance and his hatred for those who do not think like him. He dies by that same instrument of justice that up until then has served to satisfy his own thirst for blood and terror.

== Analysis ==
Gamelin's profession of painter also reflects on the book's theme. His best work is a depiction of Orestes and Electra, with Orestes resembling a self-portrait of the artist; Gamelin, like Orestes, is capable of killing his family. Élodie later comes to be identified with Electra – though, in her affair with Gamelin, where she loves him first for his mercy and then for his violence, and takes a less radical lover after he dies, she also represents France.

The character of Maurice Brotteaux is very interesting. Without being reactionary, this former noble is well aware of the problems the Revolution faces in this period and finds the charges unjustified. One might think that this character speaks for the author.

The title, Les dieux ont soif, is taken from the last issue of Camille Desmoulins's Le Vieux Cordelier, which criticized the Jacobins; that line in turn was supposedly taken from an Aztec explanation of the necessity of human sacrifice.

The novel includes a wide variety of sexual relationships. In chapter XXI France depicts a brief failed attempt at a same-sex liaison. Julie has been wearing men's clothing to avoid being recognized. A middle-aged man has often smiled at her, expressing what she thought was "discreet sympathy" for her plight. One day when it begins to rain he invites her to share his umbrella. Startled by her voice when she accepts, he runs away, leaving her rainsoaked. "She suddenly understood, and despite her worries could not prevent herself from smiling."
