= The Revolt of the Angels =

1914 novel by Anatole France

- Title page of the first edition of the English translation
- Author: Anatole France
- Original title: La Révolte des anges
- Language: French
- Genre: Satire
- Publication date: 1914

The Revolt of the Angels (La Révolte des Anges) is a 1914 novel by Anatole France.

== Plot ==
Revolt retells the classic Christian story of the war in Heaven between angels led by the archangel Michael and others led by Satan. The war ends with the defeat and casting to Earth of the latter. The plot emphasises themes of protagonists fighting a ruling hierarchy, and attempting to escape it, as well as "hiddenness, delusion, revolution, and epiphany ... a literary exploration of existential choices in an apocalyptic context". It is written, says René Boylesve, with a "deft levity". Mutual antagonism between God and his angels is emphasised, which leads to disgruntlement and ultimately rebellion by the latter.

The book tells the story of Arcade, the guardian angel of Maurice d'Esparvieu. Bored because Maurice d'Esparvieu continues sinning (has multiple love affairs), Arcade begins reading the books from the famous d'Esparvieu library on theology and realizes that God is not the creator of the Universe but a demiurge who rules with fear and ignorance. He informs Maurice that he will no longer be his guardian angel, moves to Paris and starts to look for other fallen angels who will join him in his quest to overthrow the false God. He and his comrades are able to build a huge army. Then they go to find Lucifer so that he may lead them. Lucifer welcomes them and tells them to stay the night and that he will give them an answer the next morning. At night he has a dream and in the morning he tells the angels that "God, conquered, will become Satan; Satan, conquering, will become God. May the fates spare me this terrible lot."

He says that replacing God with another is meaningless unless "in ourselves and in ourselves alone we attack and destroy Ialdabaoth". Ialdabaoth is characterized in Gnosticism as a malevolent lesser God who believes he himself alone is God, ignorant of the heavens above him. According to France, his name Ialdabaoth means "child who wanders".

== Political influences ==
France's political leanings—he was a socialist—heavily influenced Revolt, leading to the theme that successful revolutions always create greater tyrannies than those they overthrow. The bitterness created by the revolt is reflected in the "biting and harsh" descriptions. Joe Loewenberg has described the novel as an "imaginative narrative ... the ripest expression of Anatole France's urbane genius, a masterpiece of criticism at once ironic and eirenic".

== Literary references ==
Essayist David Fuchs argues that Ernest Hemingway's first published work, A Divine Gesture, suggests that he was probably aware of the book. Hemingway further references France in his first novel, The Sun Also Rises. F. Scott Fitzgerald references The Revolt of the Angels throughout his early short story The Offshore Pirate. Fitzgerald uses the book as a prop: the character Ardita is reading Revolt, herself looking, says Griffin, "iconically angelic ... reading a book about angels". Griffin argues that France's work is the more romantic of the two. Revolt has been compared with the work of George Santayana in its suggestion that religion is set back by its successes. Henry Miller mentions The Revolt of the Angels in his novel Tropic of Capricorn.
