= Penguin Island (novel) =

1908 book by Anatole France

- 1908 edition
- Author: Anatole France
- Original title: L'Île des Pingouins
- Language: French
- Genre: Satire
- Publisher: Calmann-Lévy
- Publication date: 1908
- Publication place: France
- Media type: Print (hardcover)
- Pages: 308
- ISBN: 978-1-58715-548-2

Penguin Island (1908; French: L'Île des Pingouins) is a satirical fictional history by French author Anatole France.

== Plot ==
Penguin Island is written in the style of a sprawling 18th- and 19th-century history book, concerned with grand metanarratives, mythologizing heroes, hagiography and romantic nationalism. It is about a fictitious island, inhabited by great auks, that existed off the northern coast of Europe. The history begins when a wayward Christian missionary monk lands on the island and perceives the upright, unafraid auks as a sort of pre-Christian society of noble pagans. Mostly blind from reflections from the polar ice and somewhat deaf from the roar of the sea, having mistaken the animals for humans, he baptizes them. This causes a problem for The Lord, who normally only allows humans to be baptized. After consulting with saints and theologians in Heaven, He resolves the dilemma by converting the baptized birds to humans with only a few physical traces of their ornithological origin, and giving them each a soul.

Thus begins the history of Penguinia, and from there forward the history mirrors that of France (and more generally of Western Europe, including German-speaking areas and the British Isles). The narrative spans from the Migration Period ("Dark Ages"), when the Germanic tribes fought incessantly among themselves for territory; to the heroic Early Middle Ages with the rise of Charlemagne ("Draco the Great") and conflicts with Viking raiders ("porpoises"); through the Renaissance (Erasmus); and up to the modern era with motor cars; and even into a future time in which a thriving high-tech civilization is destroyed by a campaign of terrorist bombings, and everything begins again in an endless cycle.

== Analysis ==
The longest-running plot thread, and probably the best known, satirizes the Dreyfus affair, though both brief and complex satires of European history, politics, philosophy and theology are present throughout the novel. At various points, real historical figures such as Columba and Saint Augustine are part of the story, as well as fictionalized characters who represent historical people. Penguin Island is a satire on society and human nature in which morals, customs, and the origin of religion and laws are lampooned. For example, the origin of private property is presented as starting with the brutal and shameless murder of a farmer, and the seizure of his land, by a physically larger and stronger neighbour.

Girdler B. Fitch has postulated the influence of illustrations by Grandville (Jean-Ignace-Isidore Gérard) on France's conception of Penguin Island.
