= Étienne Trocmé =

French historian

- Born: 8 November 1924; Paris
- Died: 12 August 2002 (aged 77); Étretat
- Occupation: Historian
- Spouse: Ann Bowden
- Children: four

Étienne Trocmé (8 November 1924 – 12 August 2002) was a French historian of the birth of Christianity. A New Testament and Christianity of the 1st century scholar, Trocmé is the author of several works including Jésus de Nazareth (1972) and Enfance du christianisme (1997).

== Biography ==
After he was a student at the École Nationale des Chartes (1946) and the École pratique des hautes études, Etienne Trocmé studied literature and theology from 1947 to 1950, then in 1950 passed his State doctorate (1960) He also spent one year at the University of California, Los Angeles (1946-1947) and another one at the University of Basel (1950–1951), where he familiarized with the German language and followed lessons by Karl Barth.

== Distinctions ==
- Honorary degree of the Glasgow University
- Honorary degree of the Tōyō University in Tokyo

His biographer Christian Wolff mentions he did not wear his decorations.

== Publications ==
Étienne Trocmé wrote more than 200 articles and books translated into several languages.

=== Memoirs ===
- Le Commerce rochelais de la fin du XVe au début du XVIIe, thèse, École des Chartes, 1952
- La formation de l'évangile selon Marc, thèse d'État, Paris 1963

=== Books ===
- Jésus de Nazareth vu par les témoins de sa vie, Delachaux & Niestle, 1971.
- Le christianisme des origines au Concile de Nicée, 1972
- Le Christianisme des origines à 325 in Encyclopédie de la Pléiade, Histoire des religions, t. II, 1972
- The Passion as Liturgy : a Study in the origin of the Passion narratives in the four Gospels, 1983
- La Rochelle protestante (1568-1628) in Histoire de La Rochelle, Privat, 1985, (2e éd. 1991)
- L'enfance du christianisme, Hachette, coll. « Pluriel », 1999.
- L'évangile selon saint Marc, Labor et Fides, coll. « Commentaire du Nouveau Testament, deuxième série », 2000. ISBN 2-8309-0972-0
- Quatre Évangiles, Une Seule Foi, Les Bergers Et Les Mages, coll. « Petite Bibliothèque Protestante », 2001.
- Saint Paul, coll. Que sais-je?, PUF, 2003 (posthumous)

== Sources ==
- Christian Wolff, Biographie d'Étienne Trocmé in Bibliothèque de l'école des Chartes, année 2003, Volume 161, issue 161-2, (p. 769–772) Read online
- Christian Wolff, « Étienne Trocmé », in Nouveau dictionnaire de biographie alsacienne, vol. 37, (p. 3910)

== See also ==
- Biblical criticism
- Historicity of Jesus
- Paul the Apostle
