= Monthiers =

- Commune
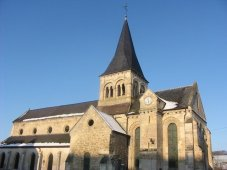
- The church of Monthiers
- Location of Monthiers
- Location within France Location within Hauts-de-France
- Coordinates: 49°06′14″N 3°17′56″E
- Country: France
- Region: Hauts-de-France
- Department: Aisne
- Arrondissement: Château-Thierry
- Canton: Villers-Cotterêts
- Intercommunality: CA Région de Château-Thierry

Government
  - Mayor (2026–32): Nicole Sarrouy
- Area^{1}: 7.37 km^{2} (2.85 sq mi)
- Elevation: 95 m (312 ft)
- Highest elevation: 199 m (653 ft)
- Lowest elevation: 87 m (285 ft)
- Population (2023): 157
  - Density: 21.3/km^{2} (55.2/sq mi)
- Time zone: UTC+01:00 (CET)
  - Summer (DST): UTC+02:00 (CEST)
- INSEE/Postal code: 02509 /02400
- ^{1} French Land Register data, which excludes lakes, ponds, glaciers > 1 km^{2} (0.386 sq mi or 247 acres) and river estuaries.

Monthiers (French pronunciation: [mɔ̃tje]) is a commune in the Aisne department in Hauts-de-France in northern France.

== Population ==
Historical population
Year	Pop.	±% p.a.
1968	126	—
1975	108	−2.18%
1982	117	+1.15%
1990	111	−0.66%
1999	142	+2.77%
2007	168	+2.12%
2012	148	−2.50%
2017	161	+1.70%
2023	157	−0.42%
Source: INSEE

== See also ==
- Communes of the Aisne department
