= Anatole France =

French author and journalist (1844–1924)

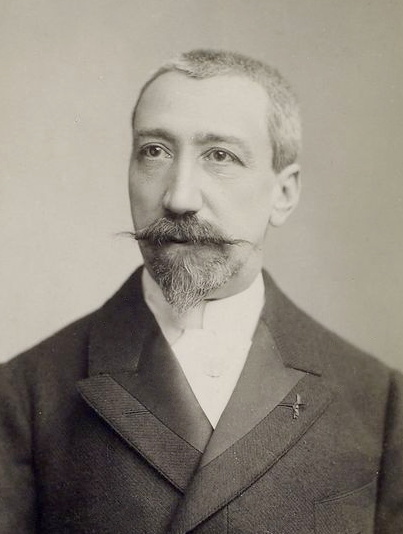
- Born: François-Anatole Thibault; 16 April 1844; Paris, France
- Died: 12 October 1924 (aged 80); Saint-Cyr-sur-Loire near Tours, France
- Occupation: Novelist
- Writing career
- Notable awards: Nobel Prize in Literature; 1921

Signature
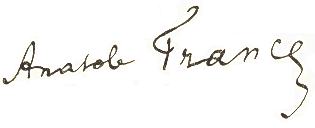

Anatole France (French: [anatɔl fʁɑ̃s]; born François-Anatole Thibault [frɑ̃swa anatɔl tibo]; 16 April 1844 – 12 October 1924) was a French poet, journalist, and novelist. Several of his books were best-sellers. Ironic and skeptical, he was considered in his day the ideal French man of letters. He was a member of the Académie Française, and won the 1921 Nobel Prize in Literature "in recognition of his brilliant literary achievements, characterized as they are by a nobility of style, a profound human sympathy, grace, and a true Gallic temperament".

France is also widely believed to be the model for Bergotte, the literary idol of the narrator Marcel in Marcel Proust's In Search of Lost Time.

== Early years ==
The son of a bookseller, France spent most of his life around books. His father's bookstore specialised in books and papers on the French Revolution and was frequented by many writers and scholars. France studied at the Collège Stanislas, a private Catholic school, and after graduation he helped his father by working in his bookstore. After several years, he secured the position of cataloguer at Bacheline-Deflorenne and at Lemerre. In 1876, he was appointed librarian for the French Senate.

== Literary career ==
France began his literary career as a poet and a journalist. In 1869, Le Parnasse contemporain published one of his poems, "La Part de Madeleine". In 1875, he sat on the committee in charge of the third Parnasse contemporain compilation. As a journalist, from 1867, he wrote many articles and notices. He became known with the novel Le Crime de Sylvestre Bonnard (1881). Its protagonist, sceptical old scholar Sylvester Bonnard, embodied France's own personality. The novel was praised for its elegant prose and won him a prize from the Académie Française.

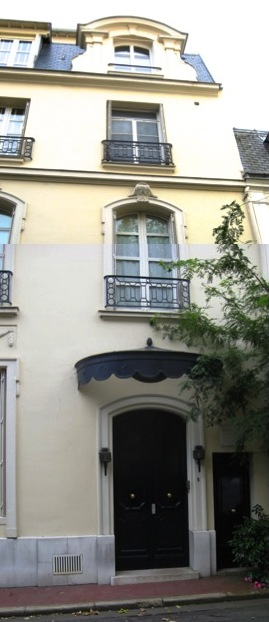
France's home, 5 villa Saïd, 1894–1924

In La Rôtisserie de la Reine Pédauque (1893) France ridiculed belief in the occult, and in Les Opinions de Jérôme Coignard (1893), France captured the atmosphere of the fin de siècle. He was elected to the Académie Française in 1896.

France took part in the Dreyfus affair. He signed Émile Zola's manifesto supporting Alfred Dreyfus, a Jewish army officer who had been falsely convicted of espionage. France wrote about the affair in his 1901 novel Monsieur Bergeret.

France's later works include Penguin Island (L'Île des Pingouins, 1908) which satirises human nature by depicting the transformation of penguins into humans – after the birds have been baptized by mistake by the almost-blind Abbot Mael. It is a satirical history of France, starting in medieval times, going on to the author's own time with special attention to the Dreyfus affair and concluding with a dystopian future. The Gods Are Athirst (Les dieux ont soif, 1912) is a novel, set in Paris during the French Revolution, about a true-believing follower of Maximilien Robespierre and his contribution to the bloody events of the Reign of Terror of 1793–94. It is a warning against political and ideological fanaticism and explores various other philosophical approaches to the events of the time. The Revolt of the Angels (La Révolte des Anges, 1914) is often considered France's most profound and ironic novel. Loosely based on the Christian understanding of the War in Heaven, it tells the story of Arcade, the guardian angel of Maurice d'Esparvieu. Bored because Bishop d'Esparvieu is sinless, Arcade begins reading the bishop's books on theology and becomes an atheist. He moves to Paris, meets a woman, falls in love, and loses his virginity causing his wings to fall off, joins the revolutionary movement of fallen angels, and meets the Devil, who realises that if he overthrew God, he would become just like God. Arcade realises that replacing God with another is meaningless unless "in ourselves and in ourselves alone we attack and destroy Ialdabaoth." "Ialdabaoth", according to France, is God's secret name and means "the child who wanders".

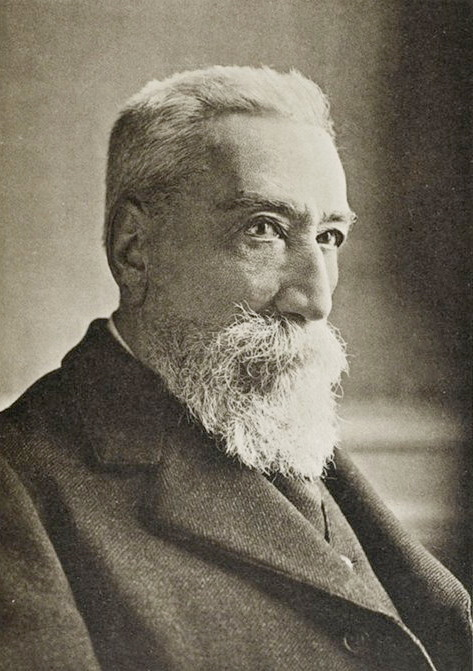
France c. 1921

He was awarded the Nobel Prize in 1921. He died on 12 October 1924 and is buried in the Neuilly-sur-Seine Old Communal Cemetery near Paris.

On 31 May 1922, France's entire works were put on the Index Librorum Prohibitorum ("List of Prohibited Books") of the Catholic Church. He regarded this as a "distinction". This Index was abolished in 1966.

== Personal life ==
In 1877, France married Valérie Guérin de Sauville, a granddaughter of Jean-Urbain Guérin, a miniaturist who painted Louis XVI. Their daughter Suzanne was born in 1881 (and died in 1918).

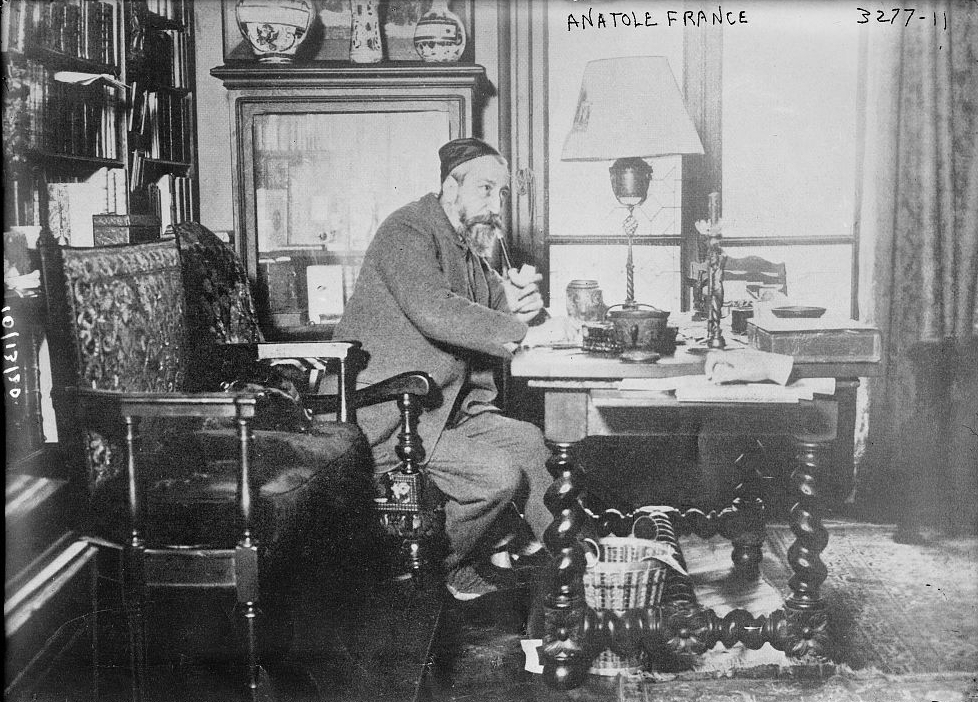
Anatole France seated at his desk

France's relations with women were always turbulent, and in 1888 he began a relationship with Madame Arman de Caillavet, who conducted a celebrated literary salon of the Third Republic. The affair lasted until shortly before her death in 1910.

After his divorce, in 1893, France had many liaisons, notably with an American, Laura Gagey, who committed suicide in 1911 after he abandoned her.

In 1920, France married for the second time, his housekeeper Emma Laprévotte.

France had socialist sympathies and was an outspoken supporter of the 1917 Russian Revolution. In 1920, he gave his support to the newly founded French Communist Party. In his book The Red Lily, France famously wrote, "The law, in its majestic equality, forbids rich and poor alike to sleep under bridges, to beg in the streets, and to steal loaves of bread."

== Reputation ==
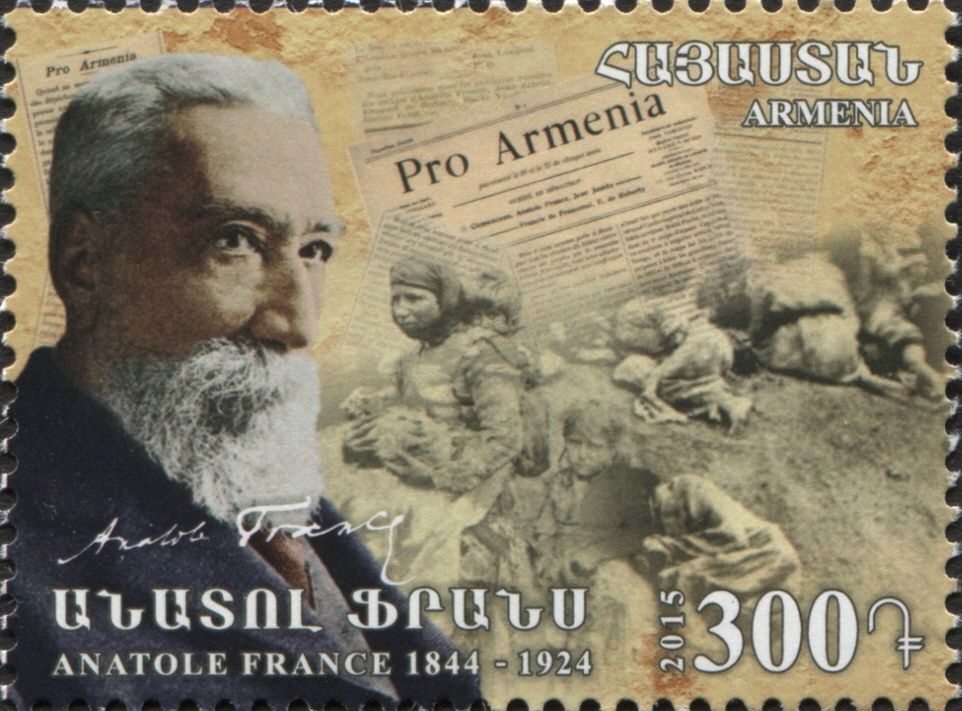
Anatole France on a postage stamp of Armenia, 2015

The English writer George Orwell defended France and declared that his work remained very readable, and that "it is unquestionable that he was attacked partly from political motives".

== Works ==
=== Poetry ===
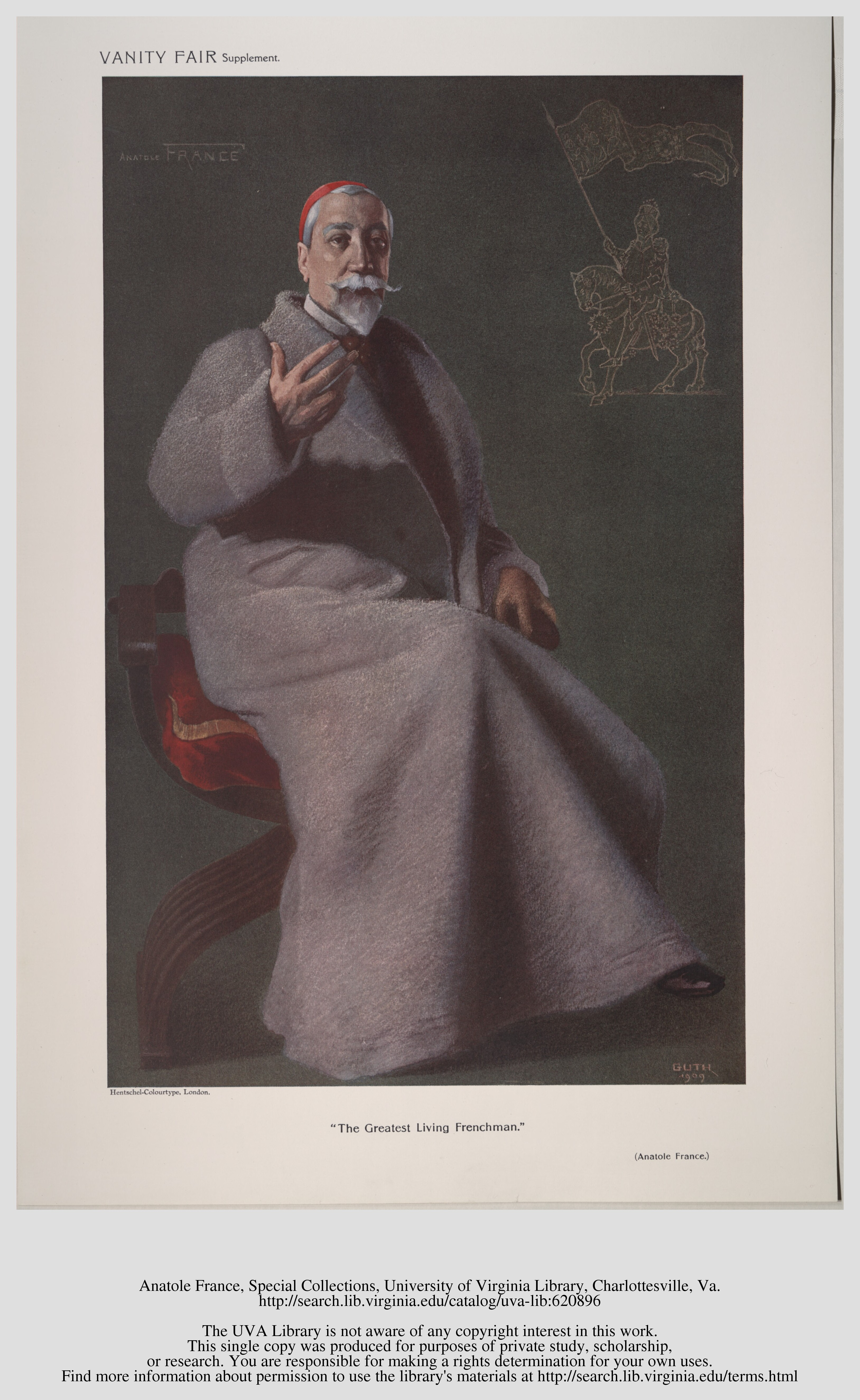
France pictured by Jean Baptiste Guth for Vanity Fair, 1909

Nos Enfants, illustrations by Louis-Maurice Boutet de Monvel (1900)

- Les Légions de Varus, poem published in 1867 in the Gazette rimée.
- Poèmes dorés (1873)
- Les Noces corinthiennes (The Bride of Corinth) (1876)

=== Prose fiction ===
- Jocaste et le chat maigre (Jocasta and the Famished Cat) (1879)
- Le Crime de Sylvestre Bonnard (The Crime of Sylvestre Bonnard) (1881)
- Les Désirs de Jean Servien (The Aspirations of Jean Servien) (1882)
- Abeille (Honey-Bee) (1883)
- Nos Enfants (Our Children: Scenes from the Country and the Town) (1886) illustrated by Louis-Maurice Boutet de Monvel
- Balthasar (1889)
- Thaïs (1890)
- L'Étui de nacre (Mother of Pearl) (1892)
- La Rôtisserie de la reine Pédauque (At the Sign of the Reine Pédauque) (1893)
- Les Opinions de Jérôme Coignard (The Opinions of Jerome Coignard) (1893)
- Le Lys rouge (The Red Lily) (1894)
- Le Puits de Sainte Claire (The Well of Saint Clare) (1895)
- L'Histoire contemporaine (A Chronicle of Our Own Times)
  - 1: L'Orme du mail (The Elm-Tree on the Mall) (1897)
  - 2: Le Mannequin d'osier (The Wicker-Work Woman) (1897)
  - 3: L'Anneau d'améthyste (The Amethyst Ring) (1899)
  - 4: Monsieur Bergeret à Paris (Monsieur Bergeret in Paris) (1901)
- Clio (1900)
- Histoire comique (A Mummer's Tale) (1903)
- Sur la pierre blanche (The White Stone) (1905)
- L'Affaire Crainquebille (1901)
- L'Île des Pingouins (Penguin Island) (1908)
- Les Contes de Jacques Tournebroche (The Merrie Tales of Jacques Tournebroche) (1908)
- Les Sept Femmes de Barbe bleue et autres contes merveilleux (The Seven Wives of Bluebeard and Other Marvelous Tales) (1909)
- Bee The Princess of the Dwarfs (1912)
- Les dieux ont soif (The Gods Are Athirst) (1912)
- La Révolte des anges (The Revolt of the Angels) (1914)
- Marguerite (1920) illustrated by Fernand Siméon

=== Memoirs ===
- Le Livre de mon ami (My Friend's Book) (1885)
- Pierre Nozière (1899)
- Le Petit Pierre (Little Pierre) (1918)
- La Vie en fleur (The Bloom of Life) (1922)

=== Plays ===
- Au petit bonheur (1898)
- Crainquebille (1903)
- La Comédie de celui qui épousa une femme muette (The Man Who Married A Dumb Wife) (1908)
- Le Mannequin d'osier (The Wicker Woman) (1928)

=== Historical biography ===
- Vie de Jeanne d'Arc (The Life of Joan of Arc) (1908)

=== Literary criticism ===
- Alfred de Vigny (1869)
- Le Château de Vaux-le-Vicomte (1888)
- Le Génie Latin (The Latin Genius) (1909)

=== Social criticism ===
- Le Jardin d'Épicure (The Garden of Epicurus) (1895)
- Opinions sociales (1902)
- Le Parti noir (1904)
- Vers les temps meilleurs (1906)
- Sur la voie glorieuse (1915)
- Trente ans de vie sociale, in four volumes, (1949, 1953, 1964, 1973)

== Honours and awards ==
- Chevalier of the Order of Legion of Honour (1884)
- Officier of the Order of Legion of Honour (1895)
- Nobel Prize in Literature (1921)
