= Ligue de l'enseignement =

La Ligue de l'enseignement
- Website type: Secular organization
- Available in: French
- Website: laligue.org
- Users: over 30,000 local chapters
- Launched: 15 November 1866; 159 years ago
- Current status: Active

La Ligue de l'enseignement was initially conceived and created by the journalist Jean Macé, on 15 November 1866. It was advocated for by liberal press, as public, free, compulsory and secular education. A congress convened in 1881, which gave La Ligue its federal form. In 1925, after World War I, La Ligue decentralized in order to create even greater access for the public needs. Midway through World War II, in 1942, the league dissolved.

In a re-founding convening congress in 1945, La Ligue deepened its involvement in secularism and the humanities. To date it remains a member of the European Humanist Federation and the International Humanist and Ethical Union.
