= Villa Saïd =

Cul-de-sac in Paris, France

Coordinates: 48.8734°N 2.2795°E

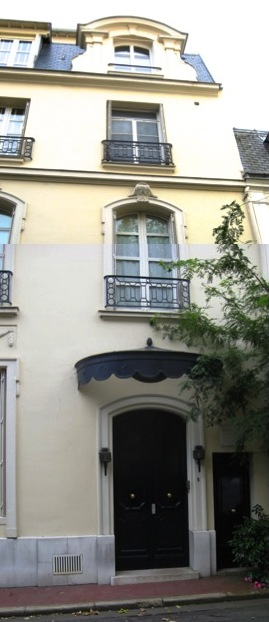
Anatole France's townhouse on the Villa Saïd

The Villa Saïd is a cul-de-sac in the 16th arrondissement of Paris, France. It runs for 200 metres from 68, Rue Pergolèse. It is 7,5 metre wide.

== History ==
The street was built by Mr. Alphonse Hardon, an investor in the development of the Suez Canal, who named it after Sa'id of Egypt.

Pierre Laval, who served as the Prime Minister of France from 1942 to 1944, moved into the hôtel particulier at 15, Villa Saïd, in 1917. He was a tenant from 1917 to 1925, and he purchased the townhouse at an auction for 371,339 French francs on July 23, 1925. Prior to the auction, Laval had sued the owner over allegations of dereliction.

Laval's next-door neighbour was French author Anatole France. Anatole France acquired this house, at no. 5, in 1894 and kept it until his death, in 1924.

The Dutch-French painter Kees van Dongen lived and painted at no. 29 after the First World War.
