= Baptists in Canada =

According to the Canada 2021 Census, the number of people in Canada who identify themselves as Baptists is 436,940, about 1.2% of the population. The major Baptist associations are the Canadian Baptist Ministries, the Fellowship of Evangelical Baptist Churches in Canada, the Canadian National Baptist Convention, and the Baptist General Conference of Canada.

== History ==
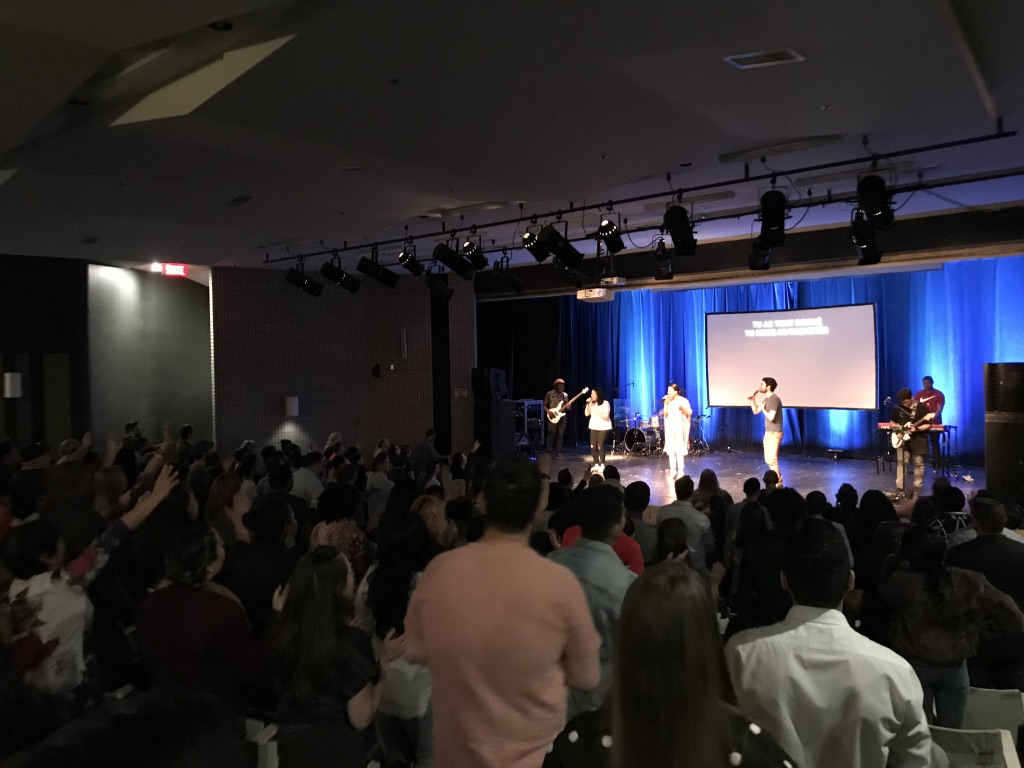
Worship service at La Chapelle in Montreal

Baptist missionary work began on the Atlantic coast in the 1760s but took around 100 years to reach the west coast. The first official record of a Baptist church in Canada was that of the Horton Baptist Church (now Wolfville) in Wolfville, Nova Scotia on October 29, 1778. The church was established with the assistance of the New Light evangelist Henry Alline. Many of Alline's followers, after his death, would convert and strengthen the Baptist presence in the Atlantic region. Two major groups of Baptists formed the basis of the churches in the maritimes. These were referred to as Regular Baptist (Calvinistic in their doctrine) and Free Will Baptists. The first Black Baptist churches in Nova Scotia were established by Richard Preston. Preston established the New Horizons Baptist Church (formerly known as Cornwallis Street Baptist Church, African Chapel and the African Baptist Church) in 1832. Preston assisted in founding several other Baptist churches across the province and played a major role in founding the African United Baptist Association in 1854.

The first congregations organized in Central Canada were at Beamsville, Ontario as early as 1776 and in 1794 at Caldwell's Manor (now Clarenceville, Quebec). Shortly thereafter churches were organized at Hallowell, Ontario (1795) and Haldimand Township (see Alnwick/Haldimand). These were Regular Baptist congregations. Churches which were in agreement began to group together into associations in order to work together for achieving common goals. A variety of associations and affiliations have occurred since then. Eventually these associations joined together to form a convention. The First Baptist Church in Toronto was founded in 1826 and has the distinction of being both the very first Baptist church and the oldest Black institution in the city of Toronto. Black refugees fleeing slavery in the United States also founded several other Baptist churches in Ontario including the Sandwich First Baptist Church in 1840 and Amherstburg First Baptist Church in 1848, both of which are National Historic Sites. The Baptist influence and mission work in Canada began to be firmly established in Toronto with the founding of the Bond Street Baptist Church in 1848. Many of the original churches were established by specific missionary groups from the United States of America and by various ethnic or language groups, such as the Swedish Baptist Churches (Baptist General Conference of Canada), North American Baptist Conference (German background), and the Ukrainian Evangelical Baptist Convention of Canada.

Three significant shifts in associations have occurred, between 1905 and 1906, in 1927, and in 1953. From 1905 to 1906, the United Baptist Convention of the Maritime Provinces formed from the union of the Maritime Convention of Maritime Baptists, the Free Baptists of New Brunswick, and the Free Baptists of Nova Scotia. The Union of Regular Baptist Churches was formed in 1927 in Hamilton, Ontario by 77 churches who had withdrawn from the Baptist Convention of Ontario and Quebec (BCOQ). This withdrawal was due to the Fundamentalist–Modernist Controversy, centred on a professor at the Convention's official seminary at McMaster University, who held a liberal/modernist position of theology.

In 1944, the BCOQ joined with the United Baptist Convention of the Maritimes and the Baptist Union of Western Canada to form the first national Canadian Baptist association, the Canadian Baptist Federation. In 1995, they merged with the Canadian Baptist International Ministries to form Canadian Baptist Ministries. The four conventions still exist within the association and counted over 1100 member churches in 1995.

By 1953 some churches had dropped out of the Union of Regular Baptist Churches, but the remainder joined with the Fellowship of Independent Baptist Churches (founded 1933) and formed the Fellowship of Evangelical Baptist Churches in Canada (FEBC). The Regular Baptist Missionary Fellowship of Alberta joined in 1963 and the Convention of Regular Baptist Churches of British Columbia (founded 1927) also joined in 1965. Known as "The Fellowship", it claims to be the largest evangelical group in Canada, with at least 500 member churches in Canada from coast to coast.

A Regular Baptist church in British Columbia joined a Southern Baptist Convention affiliate in 1953. The first SBC association was formed in 1955 and there are now 233 churches, in most provinces and territories, with the largest concentration in western Canada.

The Canadian National Baptist Convention was founded in 1957.

== Statistics ==
According to the Canada 2021 Census, the number of people in Canada who identify themselves as Baptist is 436,940, about 1.2% of the population, a decrease of about 31.3% in the 10 years since the 2011 census (see Religion in Canada).

== Education ==
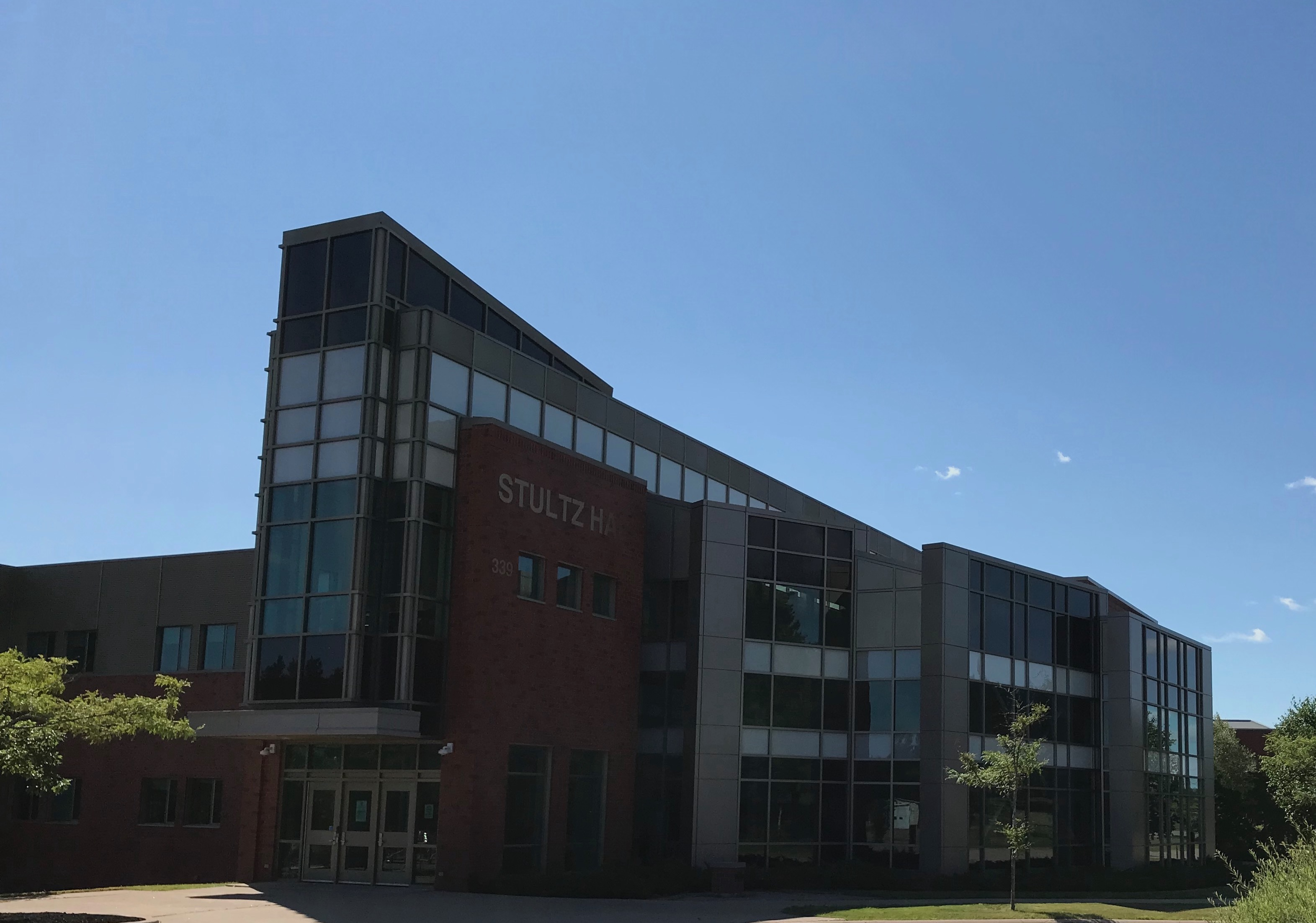
Stultz Hall, Crandall University in Moncton.

The regional conventions of the Canadian Baptist Ministries have participated in the founding of various universities which have gone public. There was the founding of Acadia University by the Canadian Baptists of Atlantic Canada in 1838, the founding of McMaster University by the Baptist Convention of Ontario and Quebec in 1881 and Brandon University by the Canadian Baptists of Western Canada in 1890. Only Crandall University, founded in 1949, remained affiliated with the Canadian Baptists of Atlantic Canada.

Baptist denominations have also founded several theological institutes in the country. In particular, there was the foundation of the Carey Theological College in 1959 in Vancouver, British Columbia by the Canadian Baptists of Western Canada (Canadian Baptist Ministries). In 1974, the Association of Evangelical Baptist Churches in Quebec (The Fellowship of Evangelical Baptist Churches in Canada) founded the Evangelical Baptist Seminary of Quebec in Montreal. In 1982, the Union of French Baptist Churches of Canada (Canadian Baptist Ministries) founded the Faculty of Evangelical Theology in Montreal. The Canadian National Baptist Convention founded the Canadian Baptist Theological Seminary and College in 1987. The Fellowship of Evangelical Baptist Churches in Canada founded the Heritage College & Seminary in 1993 in Cambridge, Ontario.
