= Gary V. Nelson =

Canadian urban missiologist (1953–2024)

- Born: January 28, 1953; Toronto, Ontario, Canada
- Died: January 22, 2024 (aged 70); Edmonton, Alberta, Canada
- Education: Fuller Theological Seminary, Pasadena
- Spouse: Dr. Carla Nelson
- Congregations served: First Baptist Church, Edmonton

Gary Vincent Nelson (January 28, 1953 – January 22, 2024) was a Canadian urban missiologist.

Prior to 2010 Nelson served as General Secretary of the Canadian Baptist Ministries. Since 2004 Nelson has been one of the Vice-presidents of the Baptist World Alliance, of which his denomination is a member-body.

== History ==
Nelson was born in Canada. He earned a degree in education (B.Ed.) from the University of British Columbia in 1976.

Nelson chose to pursue a calling to pastoral ministry and completed a Master of Divinity degree at Fuller Theological Seminary, Pasadena, California in 1980. After graduation Nelson began work as a pastor in Canada, including First Baptist, Edmonton, Alberta.

In 1984, Nelson returned to Fuller Theological Seminary and enrolled in the Doctor of Ministry program. The doctoral dissertation submitted to the Seminary in 1987 was entitled "The pre-conditions necessary for evangelism in the urban context: a study on Toronto Baptist Churches."

Nelson died in Edmonton on January 22, 2024, at the age of 70.

== Contribution ==
=== Leadership ===
On February 2, 2010, it was announced that Nelson had been appointed the president and CEO of Tyndale University, Toronto, effective July 1, 2010.

On January 28, 2020, it was announced that Nelson would retire as president and Vice Chancellor of Tyndale University on June 30, 2020.

Soon after Nelson become president a controversy erupted over Tyndale's plan to have former President of the United States, George W. Bush, speak at a breakfast hosted by Prem Watsa of Fairfax Financial Holdings on September 20, 2011. According to Tyndale professor Craig Carter, Bush "was to speak on the role of faith-based institutions in the world of higher education." Upon learning of the scheduled event, a group of alumni launched a website protesting Tyndale's association with Bush. After two days of online protests, the event was canceled "due to a scheduling change" but no other explanation was given. Following the cancellation, Nelson noted the need for Tyndale to "have clearer policies and guidelines in place so that diverse views can be expressed in a respectful and hospitable place." He also expressed regret that Tyndale "did not have such a framework in place" and stated that "Tyndale will continue to host various people to speak on issues that matter." The cancellation of Bush's visit garnered widespread attention from media outlets across Canada like the Toronto Star, the CBC, Maclean's. The decision to cancel also came under criticism from Michael Coren and Toronto pastor Joe Boot on Coren's show The Arena.

Nelson was the Speaker for the installation ceremony of the new President of the Acadia Divinity College, Wolfville on May 10, 2008. Earlier in 2008, he delivered the Graduation Address at Andhra Christian Theological College, Hyderabad in which his Church Society is a participating member.

=== Educator ===
Nelson lectured and taught courses at seminaries throughout Canada for more than two decades. He taught Church Ministry at the Edmonton Baptist Seminary, Edmonton and was also on the Doctoral Committee of St. Stephen's College, Edmonton. He oversaw programs at Carey Theological College, Vancouver.

Prior to his appointment as President of Tyndale University, Nelson had been a sessional lecturer and adjunct professor at Tyndale.

=== Publications ===
- (With Donald C. Posterski) Future Faith Churches: Reconnecting with the Power of the Gospel for the 21st Century. Kelowna, BC: Wood Lake Pub., 1997. ISBN 978-1-55154-509-7.
- Everything Old is New Again: Emerging Church Ecclesiology. A paper presented at the Symposium of the Baptist World Alliance, Elstal/Berlin, Germany, 2007.
- Borderland Churches: A Congregation's Introduction to Missional Living. St. Louis, MO: Chalice Press, St. Louis, 2008. ISBN 978-0-8272-0238-2.
- Leading in DisOrienting Times: Navigating Church and Organizational Change (with Peter Dickens). Puente Publications, May 2015

Honorary titles
Preceded by	Vice President; Baptist World Alliance; 2004–	Succeeded by
Religious titles
Preceded by	General Secretary, Canadian Baptist Ministries; 2000–2010	Succeeded by
