= McMaster Divinity College =

Christian seminary in Ontario, Canada

- Motto: Knowing... Being... Doing...
- Type: Affiliated college
- Established: 1838 as Canada Baptist College
- Religious affiliation: Canadian Baptists of Ontario and Quebec
- Academic affiliations: McMaster University, Association of Theological Schools in the United States and Canada, Council for Christian Colleges and Universities, Christian Higher Education of Canada
- President: Stanley E. Porter
- Academic staff: 14
- Students: 185
- Location: Hamilton, Ontario, Canada; 43°15′43″N 79°55′6″W
- Campus: Urban, 1.2 km^{2} (0.46 sq mi)
- Library: 2,000,000 + volumes
- Colours: Maroon & grey
- Website: mcmasterdivinity.ca

McMaster Divinity College, also known as MDC, is a Baptist Christian seminary in Hamilton, Ontario affiliated with McMaster University and the Canadian Baptists of Ontario and Quebec (Canadian Baptist Ministries).

== History ==
McMaster Divinity College traces its origins to the Toronto Baptist College, founded by Sen. William McMaster in 1881. Toronto Baptist's facilities were on Bloor Street in Toronto, now the Royal Conservatory of Music. In 1887, the college secured a charter for an independent sectarian university sponsored by the Baptist Convention of Ontario and Quebec and incorporating the arts and sciences, pastoral and missionary training, and Woodstock College (a Baptist preparatory school). The Ladies department of Woodstock College was transferred to Toronto and renamed Moulton College in honour of William McMaster's widow Susan Moulton McMaster. The university was named in honor of Sen. McMaster, who died in 1888. In 1957, McMaster University was reorganized as a secular public institution, while the theological program became McMaster Divinity College, a separately chartered affiliate college of the university.

== Partnerships ==
Since its reincorporation in 1957, McMaster Divinity College has remained a separately chartered, affiliate college of McMaster University. McMaster Divinity College is accredited affiliate with the Evangelical Fellowship of Canada, the Canadian Baptists of Ontario and Quebec (Canadian Baptist Ministries), the Association of Theological Schools in the United States and Canada and the Council for Christian Colleges & Universities. MDC also serves as a resource for many of McMaster University's Christian groups, offering worship and meeting space, as well as hosting outside speakers.

== Programs ==
McMaster Divinity College admits students to the following programs of study: Doctor of Philosophy (Ph.D.) (Christian Theology), Master of Arts (MA) (Christian Studies), Doctor of Practical Theology (DPT), Master of Divinity (M.Div.), Master of Theological Studies (MTS), Graduate Diploma in Ministry, and Graduate Certificate in Christian Studies.

== See also ==
- List of evangelical seminaries and theological colleges
- Baptists in Canada
