= Baptist General Conference of Canada =

- Classification: Evangelicalism
- Orientation: Baptist
- Associations: Evangelical Fellowship of Canada
- Headquarters: Edmonton, Alberta, Canada
- Origin: 1981
- Separated from: Baptist General Conference (United States)
- Congregations: 106
- Members: 7,137
- Official website: bgc.ca

Baptist General Conference of Canada (BGCC) is a Baptist Christian denomination in Canada. It is affiliated with the Evangelical Fellowship of Canada. The headquarters is in Edmonton, Alberta.

== History ==
The Conference has its origins in the founding of Grant Memorial Baptist Church by Swedish Baptists in Winnipeg, Manitoba in 1894. This church planted 4 other churches. The latter founded the Central Canada Baptist Conference in 1905 and became a member of the Baptist General Conference of the United States. Though organized into regional conferences, these churches were also affiliated with the Baptist Union of Western Canada (BUWC) for the first half of the 20th century. The Central Canada Baptist Conference and the Baptist General Conference in Alberta withdrew from the BUWC in 1948 and 1949, respectively. Beginning in 1977, the three districts then in existence - Baptist General Conference in Alberta, British Columbia Baptist Conference and Central Canada Baptist Conference - started exploring the possibilities of working together to evangelize Canada and the world. At the second meeting of the representatives, a recommendation came to organize a General Conference. In 1981, three Canadian Baptist general conferences, members of the Baptist General Conference of the United States, became autonomous from the latter and founded the Baptist General Conference of Canada.

The BGC churches in Canada are organized into four district conferences (BGC Alberta, BGC Central Canada, BGC Saskatchewan, and British Columbia Baptist Conference) and another region known as Eastern Expansion which includes churches in Quebec, Nova Scotia and southern Ontario.

The Conference is led by a Board composed of members from BGC churches from the districts. The executive director oversees the Canadian office, gives missional alignment to the various national ministries and provides visionary leadership to move the Conference forward.

In 1988, it founded the Canadian Baptist Seminary, located at the Trinity Western University in Langley, British Columbia.

According to a census published by the association in 2024, it claimed 106 churches.

== See also ==
- Believer's baptism
- Baptists in Canada
- Protestantism in Canada
- Christianity in Canada
- Religion in Canada
