= Union of French Baptist Churches of Canada =

Association of Baptist churches for French-speaking Canadians

Union d'Églises baptistes francophones du Canada
- Classification: Evangelicalism
- Theology: Baptist
- Associations: Canadian Baptist Ministries, Evangelical Fellowship of Canada
- Region: Canada
- Headquarters: Fulford, Quebec, Canada
- Origin: 1969; Quebec
- Congregations: 32
- Members: 2,500
- Official website: unionbaptiste.com

The Union of French Baptist Churches in Canada (French: L'Union d'Églises baptistes francophones du Canada) is a Baptist Christian denomination with a membership base of French-speaking Canadians. Headquarters is in Fulford, Quebec. The union is one of four regions of Canadian Baptist Ministries and is a member of the Evangelical Fellowship of Canada.

== History ==
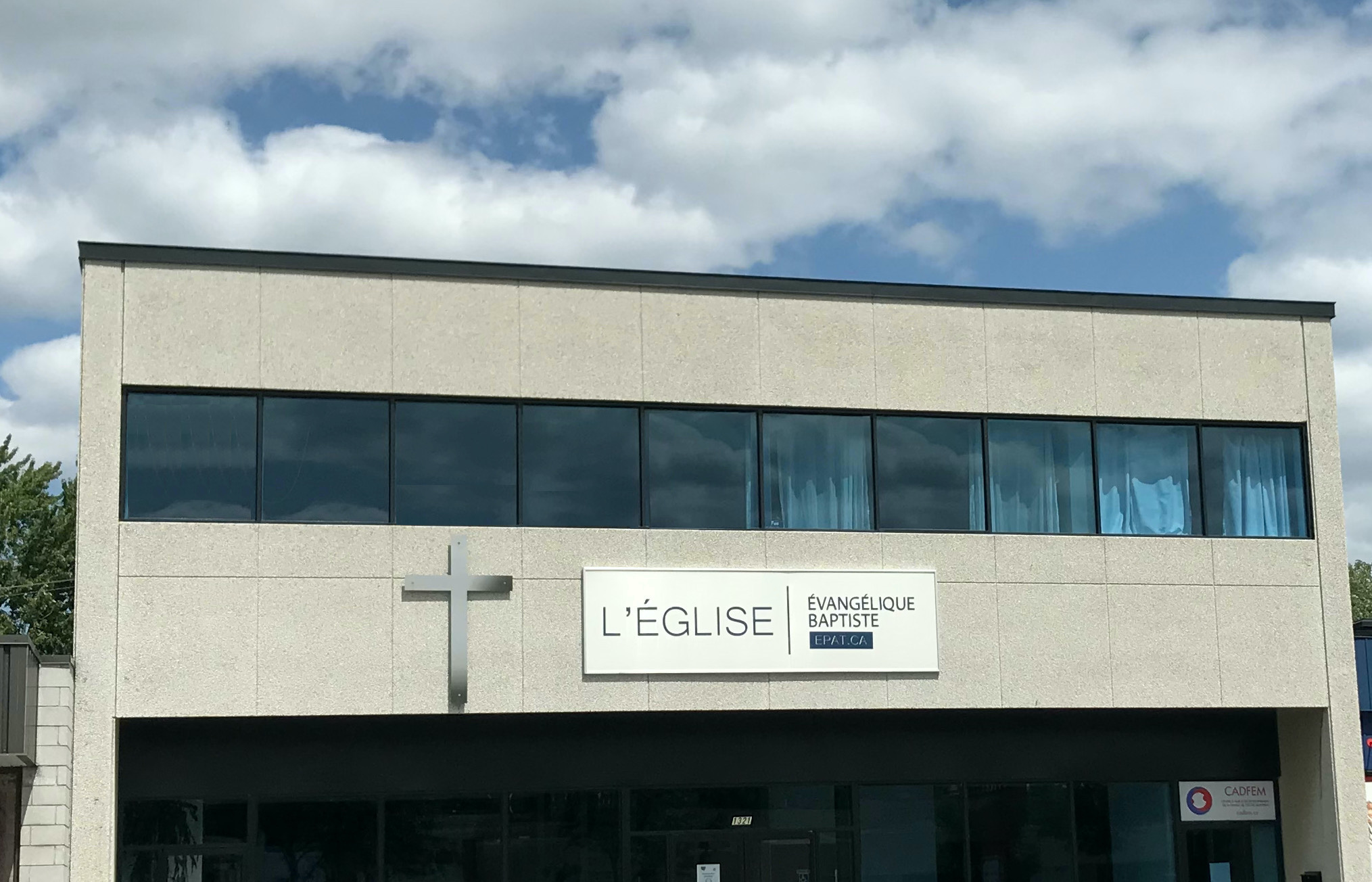
Evangelical Baptist Church of Pointe-aux-Trembles in Montreal.

The union has its origins in a Swiss mission (Mission Grande Ligne) of Henriette Feller and Louis Roussy in Grande-Ligne (becoming Saint-Blaise-sur-Richelieu) in Montérégie, in 1836. That same year, they founded a school which would become the Feller College. In 1849, the mission and school became partners of the Canadian Baptist Missionary Society. In 1969, churches established by pastors trained at the Institute officially founded the Union of French Baptist Churches in Canada. The union became part of the Canadian Baptist Ministries in 1970.

The Union opened a new Bible college, the Faculté de Théologie évangélique (Evangelical Theology Faculty) in Montreal in 1982.

In 2010, it had 29 member churches.

According to a census published by the association in 2024, it claimed 32 churches.

== Beliefs ==
The association has a Baptist confession of faith. The Union is a member of Canadian Baptist Ministries and Evangelical Fellowship of Canada.
