= Canadian National Baptist Convention =

Baptist Christian denomination in Canada

- Abbreviation: CNBC
- Classification: Evangelical
- Theology: Baptist
- Associations: Baptist World Alliance, Evangelical Fellowship of Canada
- Headquarters: Cochrane, Alberta, Canada
- Origin: 1957
- Congregations: 429
- Members: 17,116
- Official website: cnbc.ca

The Canadian National Baptist Convention (formerly Canadian Convention of Southern Baptists) is a Baptist Christian denomination in Canada. It is affiliated with the Baptist World Alliance and the Evangelical Fellowship of Canada. The headquarters is in Cochrane, Alberta.

== History ==
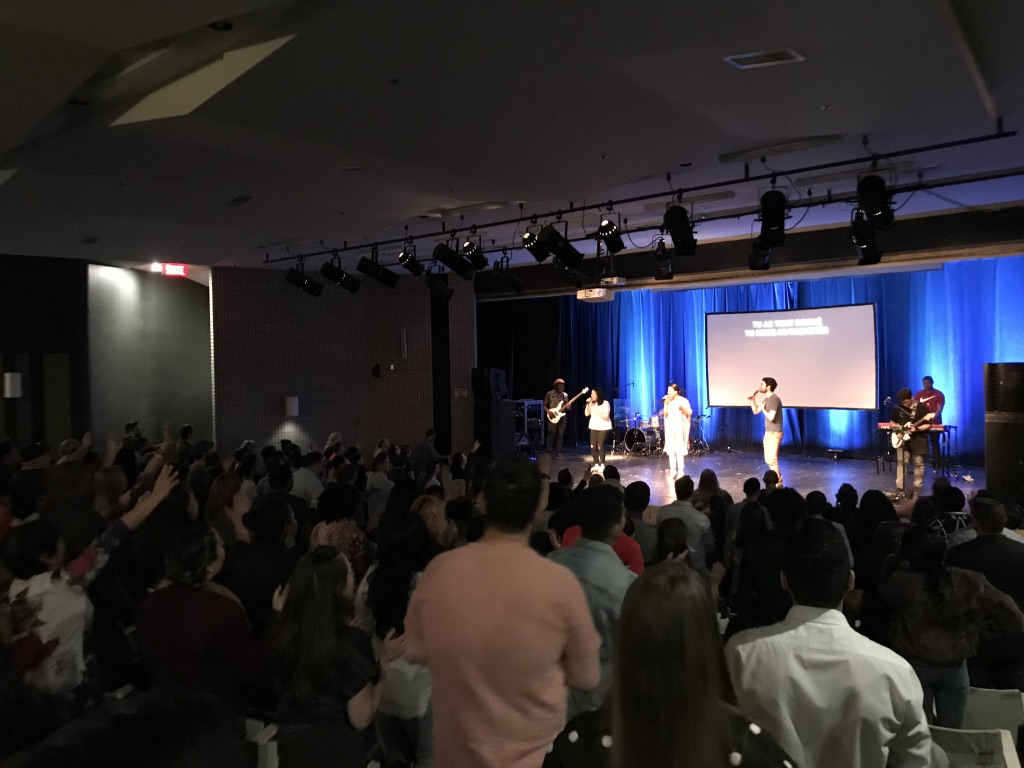
Worship service at La Chapelle in Montreal

The Convention had its origins in a partnership project between the Association of Regular Baptist Churches of British Columbia and the Baptist General Convention of Oregon-Washington (Southern Baptist Convention) after the latter's executive secretary gave a talk on evangelism at Northwest Baptist College in Port Coquitlam in 1951.

In 1955, five Regular Baptist churches in Western Canada became members of the Baptist General Convention of Oregon-Washington, an affiliate of the Southern Baptist Convention, while also maintaining membership in the Regular Baptist Convention of British Columbia. The Oregon-Washington Convention determined it would assist affiliated churches, but would not initiate any new work in Canada. At the British Columbia Regular Baptist Convention in 1955, several resolutions were directed against the Emmanuel Church (now called Kingcrest Southern Baptist Church) and the Southern Baptists. This caused Kingcrest and four other churches to withdraw from the B. C. Convention and affiliate with only the Southern Baptists in the northwest. Though these Canadian churches were members of the Oregon-Washington Convention, they were unable to affiliate directly with the SBC, because of questions relating to the wording of the SBC Constitution.

In 1957, these churches founded the Canadian Southern Baptist Conference. In 1985, it was renamed the Canadian Convention of Southern Baptists and had 58 churches. In 1987, it opened the Canadian Baptist Theological Seminary and College in Cochrane, Alberta.

In 2001, the attendance was 10,189 members. In July 2008, the convention voted to change its name to the Canadian National Baptist Convention (In French: Convention Nationale Baptiste Canadienne). According to a census published by the association in 2023, it claimed 429 churches and 17,116 members.

== Ministries ==
Its official publication, Baptist Horizon is published 4 times per year and is also available online at the CNBC web site. The Convention engages in specific men's, women's, youth and university ministries. The CNBC maintains a Foundation for receiving financial contributions, labors in Canadian church planting, and partners in global missions with the International Mission Board of the SBC. The National Leadership Board, elected by Convention messengers, is the highest operating board within the organization.

== Beliefs ==
The association has a Baptist confession of faith. It is affiliated with the Baptist World Alliance.

== See also ==
- Baptists in Canada

== Sources ==
- Baptists Around the World, by Albert W. Wardin, Jr.
- Encyclopedia of Southern Baptists, Vol. III, Davis C. Woolley, editor
- Canadian National Baptist Convention
