= Protestantism in Canada =

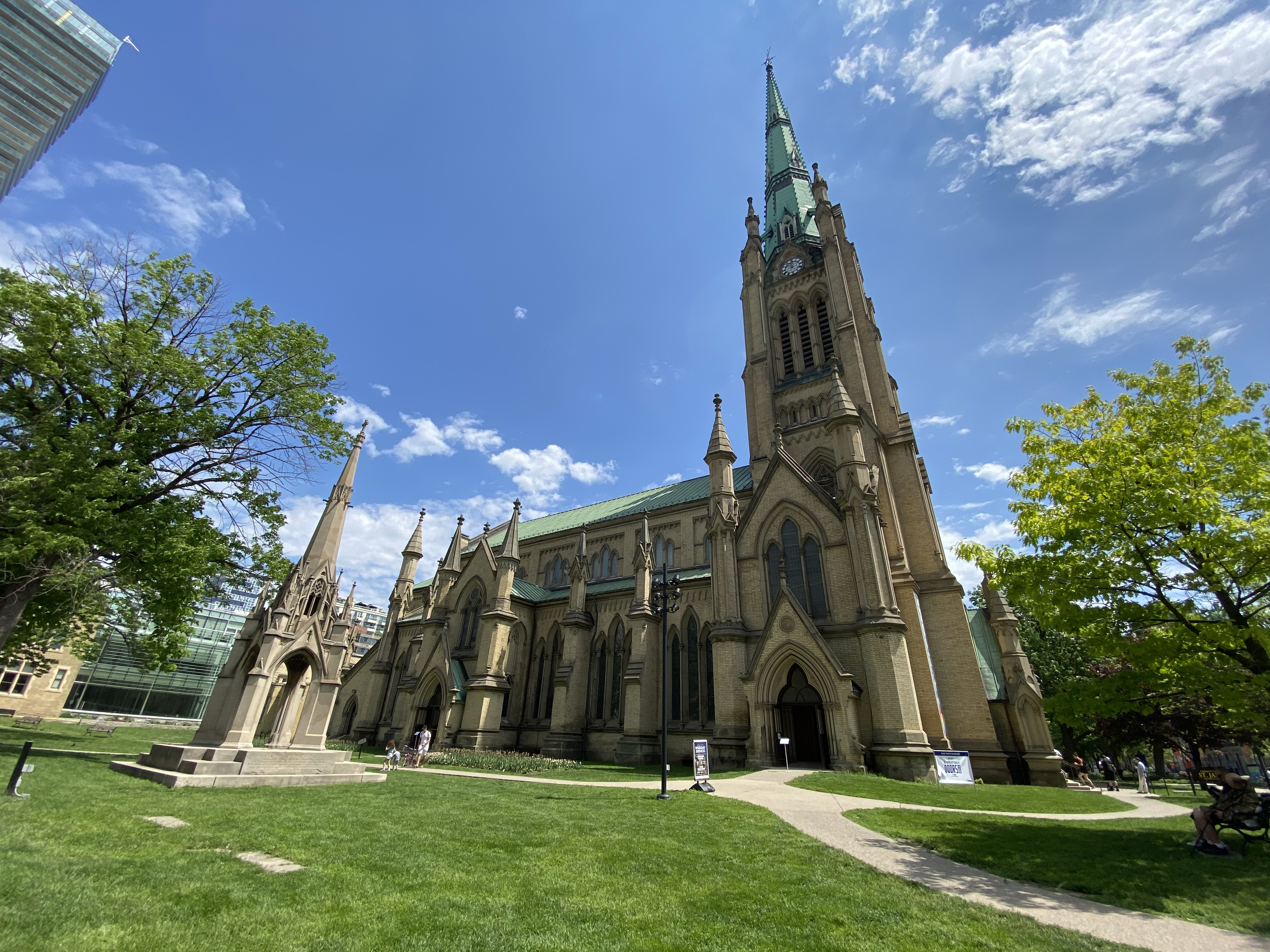
- Cathedral Church of St. James, Toronto
- Orientation: Mainline Protestant (predominantly)
- Polity: Various
- Associations: Canadian Council of Churches; Evangelical Fellowship of Canada
- Region: Canada
- Origin: Since the 17th century
- Members: 14.1% of Canadians (5,109,195 as of 2021)

Protestantism in Canada has existed as a major faith in Canada and within Canadian Christianity ever since parts of northern Canada were colonized by the English. As of 2021, 14.1% of Canadians identified as Protestant. According to a study by Pew Researchers published in 2013, 27% of Canadians are Protestant. Based on 2021 census, Protestant faiths collectively form the third largest religious group in Canada after the largest, those with no religious affiliation (34.6%), and the second largest group, Roman Catholicism (29.9%).

== Statistics ==
Protestantism in Canada (1871−2021)
Branch/Denomination	1871 census		1881 census		1891 census		1901 census		1911 census		1921 census		1931 census		1941 census		1951 census		1961 census		1971 census		1981 census		1991 census		2001 census		2011 census (Note: The 2011 data is from the National Household Survey and so numbers are estimates.)		2021 census	
Branch/Denomination	Pop.	%	Pop.	%	Pop.	%	Pop.	%	Pop.	%	Pop.	%	Pop.	%	Pop.	%	Pop.	%	Pop.	%	Pop.	%	Pop.	%	Pop.	%	Pop.	%	Pop.	%	Pop.	%
Methodist–Evangelical	572,396	16.42%	742,981	17.18%	861,714	17.83%	945,043	17.59%	1,118,300	15.52%	1,207,515	13.74%	79,239	0.76%	70,673	0.61%	136,492	0.97%	164,796	0.9%	176,010	0.82%	259,500	1.08%	311,240	1.15%	308,975	1.04%	292,205	0.89%	247,240	0.68%
Presbyterian	544,998	15.63%	676,165	15.63%	755,326	15.63%	842,459	15.68%	1,115,472	15.48%	1,409,407	16.04%	870,728	8.39%	830,597	7.22%	781,747	5.58%	818,558	4.49%	872,330	4.04%	812,105	3.37%	636,295	2.36%	409,830	1.38%	472,385	1.44%	301,400	0.83%
Anglican	494,049	14.17%	574,818	13.29%	646,059	13.37%	680,620	12.67%	1,043,072	14.47%	1,407,994	16.02%	1,636,349	15.77%	1,754,368	15.25%	2,060,720	14.71%	2,409,068	13.21%	2,543,175	11.79%	2,436,375	10.12%	2,188,110	8.11%	2,035,500	6.87%	1,631,845	4.97%	1,134,310	3.12%
Baptist	227,898	6.54%	275,291	6.37%	302,565	6.26%	316,477	5.89%	382,666	5.31%	421,731	4.8%	443,341	4.27%	484,465	4.21%	519,585	3.71%	593,553	3.25%	593,553	2.75%	696,850	2.89%	663,360	2.46%	729,475	2.46%	635,840	1.94%	436,940	1.2%
Lutheran	37,935	1.09%	46,350	1.07%	63,982	1.32%	92,524	1.72%	229,864	3.19%	286,458	3.26%	394,194	3.8%	401,836	3.49%	444,923	3.18%	662,744	3.63%	715,740	3.32%	702,905	2.92%	636,210	2.36%	606,595	2.05%	478,185	1.46%	328,045	0.9%
Protestant, n.i.e. & n.o.s.	37,065	1.06%	35,861	0.83%	29,666	0.61%	42,425	0.79%	66,141	0.92%	81,467	0.93%	81,077	0.78%	41,521	0.36%	35,715	0.25%	51,304	0.28%	21,705	0.1%	137,425	0.57%	720,385	2.67%	641,305	2.16%	647,140	1.97%	514,055	1.42%
Congregationalist	21,829	0.63%	26,900	0.62%	28,157	0.58%	28,293	0.53%	34,054	0.47%	30,730	0.35%	694	0.01%	—N/a	—N/a	—N/a	—N/a	—N/a	—N/a	—N/a	—N/a	145	0%	6,600	0.02%	6,155	0.02%	2,510	0.01%	1,150	0%
Anabaptist	13,146	0.38%	30,065	0.7%	12,911	0.27%	50,380	0.94%	64,732	0.9%	83,944	0.96%	119,529	1.15%	128,432	1.12%	139,113	0.99%	181,942	1%	212,345	0.98%	235,705	0.98%	269,190	1%	243,275	0.82%	201,190	0.61%	158,270	0.44%
Unitarian/Universalist	7,171	0.21%	6,643	0.15%	4,963	0.1%	5,553	0.1%	6,545	0.09%	7,830	0.09%	7,469	0.07%	—N/a	—N/a	3,517	0.03%	15,062	0.08%	21,000	0.1%	17,510	0.07%	19,910	0.07%	20,535	0.07%	—N/a (Note: Classified as a separate religion following the 2011 census.)	—N/a	—N/a	—N/a
Adventist	6,179	0.18%	7,211	0.17%	6,354	0.13%	8,058	0.15%	10,417	0.14%	14,200	0.16%	16,026	0.15%	18,485	0.16%	21,398	0.15%	25,999	0.14%	28,585	0.13%	41,605	0.17%	52,360	0.19%	62,880	0.21%	66,940	0.2%	68,935	0.19%
Latter Day Saint	534	0.02%	—N/a	—N/a	—N/a	—N/a	6,891	0.13%	15,982	0.22%	19,717	0.22%	22,132	0.21%	25,328	0.22%	32,888	0.23%	50,016	0.27%	66,635	0.31%	89,870	0.37%	100,770	0.37%	104,745	0.35%	108,665	0.33%	87,725	0.24%
Spiritualist	—N/a	—N/a	—N/a	—N/a	—N/a	—N/a	616	0.01%	674	0.01%	1,558	0.02%	2,263	0.02%	—N/a	—N/a	—N/a	—N/a	—N/a	—N/a	—N/a	—N/a	1,940	0.01%	3,735	0.01%	3,295	0.01%	—N/a	—N/a	—N/a	—N/a
Jehovah's Witness	—N/a	—N/a	—N/a	—N/a	—N/a	—N/a	99	0%	407	0.01%	6,678	0.08%	13,552	0.13%	7,007	0.06%	34,596	0.25%	68,018	0.37%	174,805	0.81%	143,480	0.6%	168,370	0.62%	154,750	0.52%	137,775	0.42%	137,255	0.38%
Reformed	—N/a	—N/a	—N/a	—N/a	—N/a	—N/a	63	0%	1,073	0.01%	2,700	0.03%	2,931	0.03%	—N/a	—N/a	—N/a	—N/a	62,257	0.34%	83,385	0.39%	104,175	0.43%	119,020	0.44%	115,735	0.39%	102,830	0.31%	80,650	0.22%
Pentecostal–Charismatic	—N/a	—N/a	—N/a	—N/a	—N/a	—N/a	43	0%	579	0.01%	7,258	0.08%	26,669	0.26%	57,742	0.5%	95,131	0.68%	143,877	0.79%	220,390	1.02%	339,850	1.41%	438,995	1.63%	372,695	1.26%	480,670	1.46%	399,035	1.1%
United Church	—N/a	—N/a	—N/a	—N/a	—N/a	—N/a	—N/a	—N/a	—N/a	—N/a	8,728	0.1%	2,017,375	19.44%	2,208,658	19.19%	2,867,271	20.47%	3,664,008	20.09%	3,768,805	17.47%	3,758,015	15.6%	3,093,120	11.46%	2,839,125	9.58%	2,007,610	6.11%	1,214,185	3.34%
Total Protestants	1,963,200	56.32%	2,422,285	56.01%	2,711,697	56.11%	3,019,501	56.22%	4,089,978	56.75%	4,997,915	56.87%	5,733,568	55.25%	6,029,112	52.4%	7,173,096	51.2%	8,911,202	48.86%	9,572,155	44.38%	9,777,455	40.6%	9,427,670	34.92%	8,654,870	29.2%	7,265,790	22.12%	5,109,195	14.06%
Total responses	3,485,761	100%	4,324,810	100%	4,833,239	100%	5,371,315	100%	7,206,643	100%	8,788,483	100%	10,376,786	100%	11,506,655	100%	14,009,429	100%	18,238,247	100%	21,568,295	100%	24,083,480	98.93%	26,994,045	98.89%	29,639,060	98.77%	32,852,360	98.14%	36,328,465	98.21%
Total population	3,485,761	100%	4,324,810	100%	4,833,239	100%	5,371,315	100%	7,206,643	100%	8,788,483	100%	10,376,786	100%	11,506,655	100%	14,009,429	100%	18,238,247	100%	21,568,311	100%	24,343,181	100%	27,296,859	100%	30,007,094	100%	33,476,688	100%	36,991,981	100%

== History ==
=== Under French control ===
In the early 1600s, the French were the first European nation to establish permanent colonies in Canada, calling the areas they colonized New France. The French attempted to set up these colonies in a way that established the Roman Catholic Church as the foundation of colonial society and gave the Roman Catholic Church a monopoly on religion, with only French-born Roman Catholics being allowed to immigrate to New France after 1627 . The majority of French were Roman Catholic, but there were smaller populations of Protestants and Jews in New France. These non-Catholics who were barred from public worship, public office, and most professions. However, the French aspiration to make Roman Catholicism the foundation of society in New France was never fully realized. With the British conquest of Canada during the French and Indian War and the subsequent signing of the Treaty of Paris (1763), which officially recognized the transition of control over France's Canadian territories to the British Empire, the British began to focus on Protestant expansion in the region.

=== Under British control ===
There had been prior efforts to introduce Protestantism to the areas of Canada under British control in the years leading up to British control of Canada being officially awarded in the Treaty of Paris. The first large communities of Protestants established by the British were in the Maritimes. Due to prior French control, this territory was inhabited by native populations and French Roman Catholics. The British could not convince British Protestants to immigrate to this area, but the British were intent on introducing Protestantism to counterbalance French Roman Catholic influence, incentivizing French and German Protestants to move to the territory. Thousands moved to Nova Scotia and were known as the Foreign Protestants. The British sought to expand Protestant faith throughout the territory through missionary conversions of native populations and the immigration of Protestants to Canada, favoring the British Church of England and initially suppressing the Roman Catholic Church . Recognizing the majority-Catholic nature of the former French colonies and hoping to prevent Catholic and Protestant conflict, the Treaty of Paris included an acceptance of Roman Catholicism under British rule as Catholicism is a Christian faith. Following the American Revolution, there was a large influx of United Empire Loyalist Protestants from the United States into Canada. Immigrants from many different Protestant faiths came to Canada, introducing these various Protestant faiths to the religious landscape and further preventing the establishment of the Church of England as Canada's official religion. This ambition was wholly abandoned by the mid-1800s, with Christian religious pluralism fully acknowledged and accepted, though Canada was still considered a Christian society. An 1871 census shows that at one point, the majority of Canadians were some form of Protestant, with 56.45% of the population identifying as belonging to a Protestant Faith. There was eventually an influx of Roman Catholic and other non-Protestant Christian immigrants to Canada, and Roman Catholicism eventually eclipsed Protestantism as the religious group with the most adherents in 1961. Roman Catholics have remained the largest religious group in Canada since 1961 and Protestant membership is declining. Religion has played a large role in Canadian public life and politics, and secularization in Canada was a long process. Though it began long before then, the 1960s saw the dramatic secularization of Canadian institutions, such as education. Canada detached their institutions from religion as part of an effort to modernize these institutions.

=== Post-independence ===
The secularization of Canadian society marks a significant institutional and social departure from European-controlled Canadian society, as Canada has transitioned into a post-colonial society, they have attempted to detach from those religious institutional links established by the British Empire. However, while the Protestant faith has particularly declined since secularization, Evangelical Protestantism has grown more popular in Canada. Canada's largest Protestant branch, the United Church of Canada, underwent dramatic liberalization during the 1960s, abandoning evangelical tendencies and creating a gap in the religious market, which may have benefited Evangelical denominations in terms of gaining followers, particularly in more socially conservative areas of the country that are resistant to the modernization and liberalization that has accompanied Canadian Independence and secularization. There has also been an increase in the numbers of those with no religious affiliation and those belonging to a non-Protestant or Catholic faith. While Protestantism was once the faith of the majority in Canada, the Protestant share of the population has declined by over half of what it was around 150 years ago.

== Notable branches ==
=== United Church of Canada ===
The United Church of Canada is the largest Protestant group in Canada, with 2021 estimates suggesting the membership of just over 1.2 million. Officially formed in 1925, the United Church of Canada is the amalgamation of almost all of Canada's Congregationalists and Methodists and most of Canada's Presbyterians, and many Christian independents. The United Church of Canada is a mainline Protestant faith, though its founding denominations were evangelical. The church has since gone through efforts to increase inclusivity and liberalization beginning in the 1960s, with declining membership also beginning in the 1960s. Despite declining membership, the United Church of Canada remains the largest Protestant branch and the second-largest Christian branch behind Roman Catholicism, with the church still an influential force in Canada.

=== Anglican Church of Canada ===
Originally named the Church of England in the Dominion of Canada, the Anglican Church of Canada traces its origins to the Church of England and the British colonization of Canada. Following the British occupation of formerly French territories, the British began introducing Protestantism to Canada, largely through their own Church of England. The modern Anglican Church of Canada is independent from the Church of England and is one of 45 churches in the worldwide Anglican Communion. With 2021 estimates suggesting membership of over 1.1 million members in Canada, the Anglican Church of Canada is Canada's second-largest Protestant faith and third largest Christian faith.

== See also ==
- Catholicism in Canada
- Religion in Canada
