= Tyndale University =

Evangelical Christian college in Toronto, Ontario, Canada

Coordinates: 43°48′0″N 79°23′09″W

- Motto: Douloi Cristou
- Motto in English: Servants of Christ
- Type: Private
- Established: 1894
- Affiliations: CBIE, ATS, CHEC, CCCU, ABHE
- Religious affiliation: Evangelical Christian
- Chancellor: Harriet Thornhill
- President: Marjory Kerr
- Students: 1361
- Undergraduates: 616
- Postgraduates: 705
- Doctoral students: 40
- Location: Toronto, Ontario, Canada
- Campus: Suburban
- Colours: blue and gold
- Nickname: Guardians
- Website: tyndale.ca

Tyndale University is a Canadian private interdenominational evangelical Christian university in Toronto, Ontario, which offers undergraduate and graduate programs. Tyndale students come from over 40 different Christian denominations.

== History ==
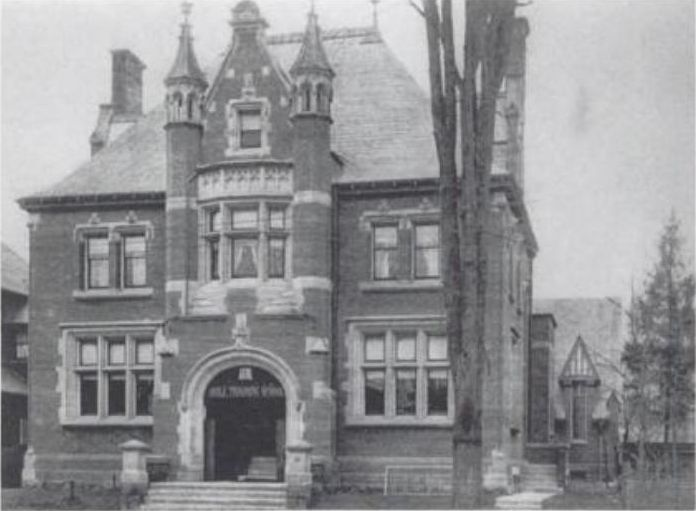
Toronto Bible Training School 1898 (110 College Street, Toronto; 1898)

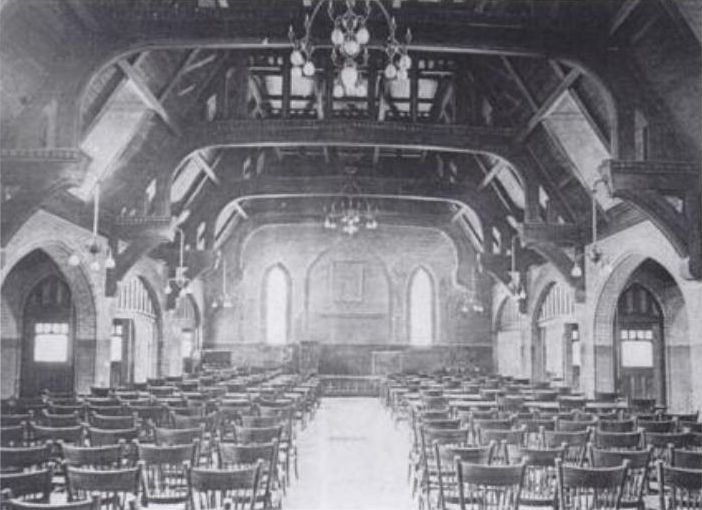
Toronto Bible Training School Main Hall 1898 (110 College Street, Toronto; 1898)

Tyndale's logo until 2012

The Toronto Bible Training School was founded in 1894 by a group of brethren under the supervision of Elmore Harris, pastor of Walmer Road Baptist Church. Elmore Harris became the first president. William Boyd Stewart (former pastor of Bond Street Baptist Church) was the first principal. Courses were held at the Walmer Road Church for the first four years until they relocated to new facilities the Gothic Revival building at 110 College Street (demolished after 1928 and now site of the University of Toronto's Banting and Best Department of Medical Research Building since 1930) in 1898 financed chiefly through generous contributions of the Harris family. (This land had been leased from the University of Toronto). The name of the school was changed to Toronto Bible College in 1912 and in September 1928 relocated to 16 Spadina Road (just north of Bloor Street and now Native Canadian Centre) when the lease expired. It became the first permanent Canadian Bible school and only the third in North America. The founders' vision of TBC was to train laypeople as "Sunday School teachers, Pastors' Assistants, and as City, Home and Foreign Missionaries." The institution's leadership was largely Baptist and Presbyterian, but also included Methodists and Anglicans. The TBC graduation service was always a significant Toronto event, held initially at Massey Hall, and then moved to the University of Toronto's Varsity Stadium to accommodate crowds as large as 6,000.

In the 1940s, the school's president, John McNicol, steered a path between modernism and ultra-fundamentalism (specifically dispensationalism)--both of which McNicol denounced as threats to the health of the church. This unique position gained TBC the support of evangelicals in a variety of mainline denominations.

In 1968, Toronto Bible College merged with the London College of Bible and Missions from London, Ontario to form the Ontario Bible College. LCBM began in 1935 as the London Bible Institute, led by J. Wilmot Mahood. The newly merged institution was named Ontario Bible College (OBC). This merger brought more students to the Toronto-based institution from other evangelical denominations including the Associated Gospel Churches, the Brethren, and the Mennonite Brethren. In 1976 OBC relocated to a former Jesuit seminary (Regis College) on Ballyconnor Court in Willowdale, Toronto (formerly City of North York), designed by modernist architect Peter Dickinson. In the same year, the institution also established a graduate school named Ontario Theological Seminary (OTS). OBC/OTS was given degree-granting powers by the Government of Ontario in 1986, and received full accreditation by the Association of Theological Schools in 1989.

By 1995, the institution had become insolvent and filed to make a proposal to creditors under the Bankruptcy and Insolvency Act in Canada. A new president, Brian Stiller, and CFO, Winston Ling, were brought on and a new board was chosen. In 1998 the school was renamed Tyndale College and Seminary after William Tyndale, a Reformation theologian of the sixteenth century. The leadership intended the name change to indicate their vision to build "a world-class centre of Christian higher education in Canada."

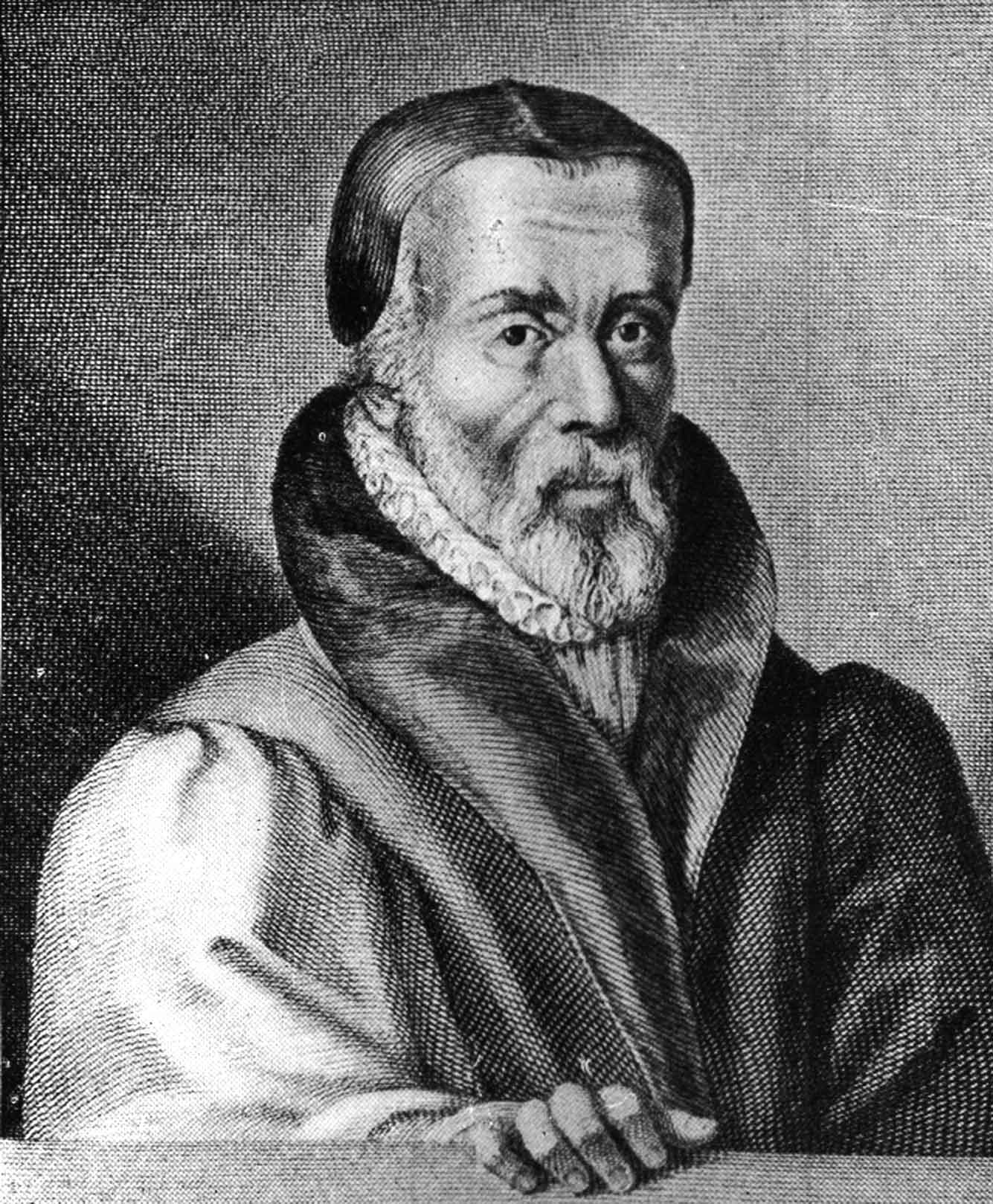
William Tyndale

In 2003, the Ontario Legislature authorized Tyndale to change its name to Tyndale University College and Seminary. Tyndale was also given the right to confer the Bachelor of Arts degree in the humanities, social sciences and business, as well as undergraduate, graduate and doctoral level degrees in religion, theology, and divinity. On December 5, 2007, Tyndale was given ministerial consent by the Province of Ontario to offer a Bachelor of Education program to prepare teachers for primary, junior, and intermediate grades.

In June 2006, Tyndale entered into an agreement to acquire a neighbouring facility, St. Joseph's Morrow Park, 3377 Bayview Avenue, from the Sisters of St. Joseph of Toronto. A key reason for Vatican approval of the pending transfer of the campus from Catholic to Protestant hands was Tyndale's commitment to maintain the aesthetically significant chapel as "sacred space." The facility transfer was completed on March 31, 2013, and all departments and offices were moved to 3377 Bayview Avenue in the Spring of 2015 with the adjacent high school continuing to operate in that building until December 2020.

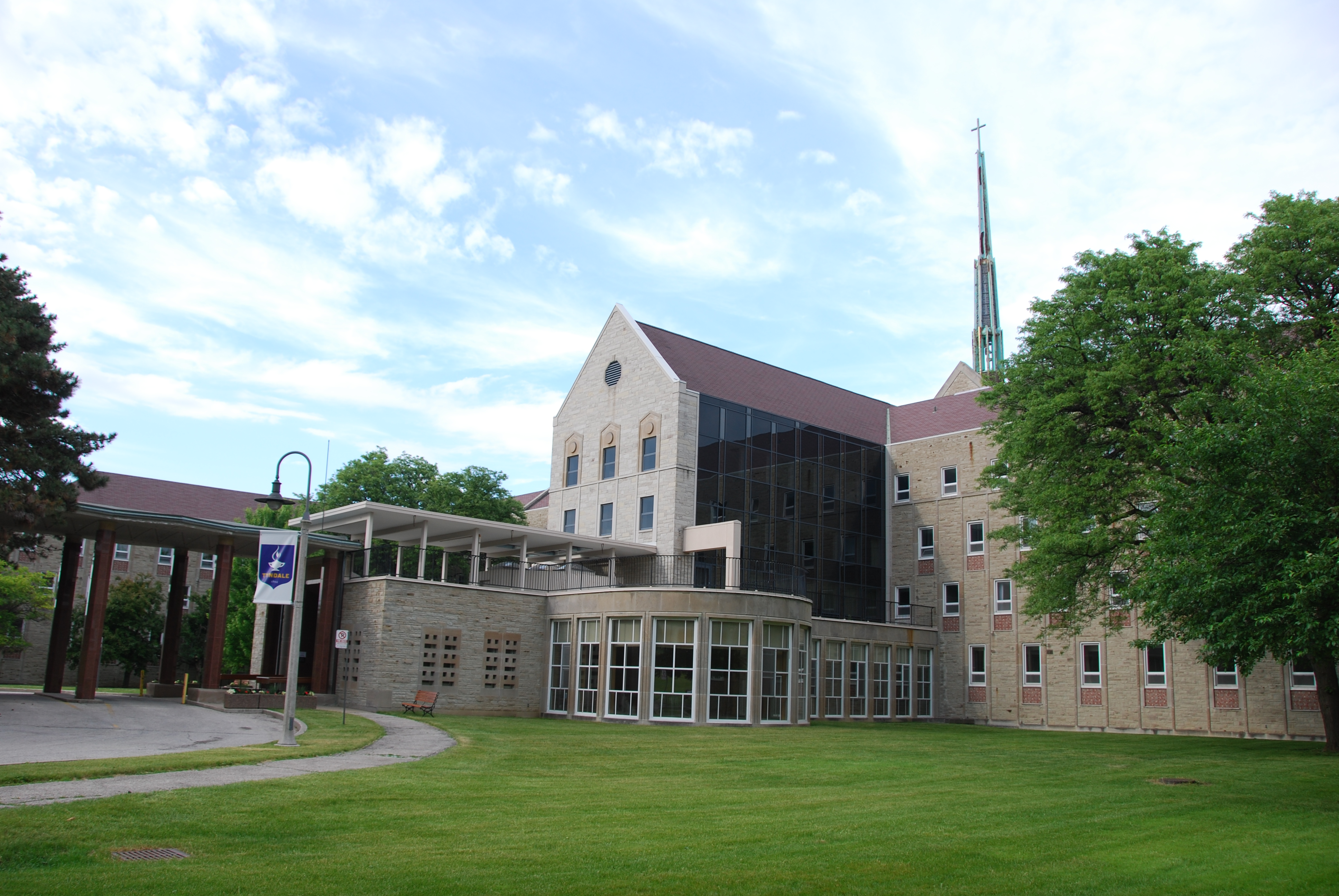
Tyndale University campus in Bayview Woods-Steeles, Toronto, 2013.

Tyndale Seminary is the largest accredited seminary in Canada with more than 700 students at the masters or doctoral level, and the University College received high rankings in the 2009 Maclean's University issue's measure of student satisfaction (see below). In 2011, student satisfaction was amongst the highest of all Canadian universities. While students ranked the quality of teaching and classroom discussion above average, the Maclean's study also found the institution below average in some educational practices, including active and collaborative learning.

In January 2020, consent was granted by the Ontario Ministry of Training, Colleges and Universities for Tyndale to remove "& College" from its title. Tyndale's corporate branding and logos were altered to reflect the change in name to Tyndale University.

== Academics ==
=== Undergraduate ===
The university offers the following degrees: Bachelor of Arts, Bachelor of Business Administration, Bachelor of Religious Education, and Bachelor of Education.

Majors in business administration, English, history, philosophy, psychology, and religious studies receive a foundation of general knowledge before moving on to their areas of specialization. Tyndale offers a Bachelor of Arts degree in human services conjointly with Seneca College, which allows a student to earn a BA degree from Tyndale plus a diploma in either early childhood education or social service work from Seneca. Graduates of the sixteen-month Bachelor of Education (BEd) program are eligible for a Certificate of Qualification from the Ontario College of Teachers. The Bachelor of Religious Education (BRE) is a three-year professional degree for students preparing for various forms of Christian ministry. Tyndale also offer a one-year Certificate in Christian Studies.

In 2008 Tyndale received the top score in the Canadian University Survey Consortium survey of students who agreed or strongly agreed that they are satisfied with the quality of teaching they have received; the results were subsequently published in the Maclean's 2009 University issue. Tyndale also ranked first overall in the number of students who strongly agreed that they are satisfied with their "decision to attend this university."

=== Seminary ===
The seminary is the largest theological school in Canada accredited by the Association of Theological Schools in the United States and Canada. It is approved to grant the following graduate degrees: Doctor of Ministry (D.Min.), Master of Theology (Th.M.), Master of Divinity (M.Div.), Master of Arts (MA), and Master of Theological Studies (MTS). In addition, Tyndale Seminary also offers graduate diploma programs in six areas of concentration: Biblical studies, Theological studies, Leadership, Global missions & intercultural studies, Spiritual formation, Christian education & discipleship, Pastoral ministry, and Youth and family ministry. The seminary offers courses in the traditional day and evening format, as well as online and modular courses.

Tyndale Seminary offers all of the courses required by the American Association of Marriage and Family Therapy for certification as a Registered Marriage and Family Therapist. Graduates of this program can move toward credentialing in the Province of Ontario to offer psychotherapy in agencies (secular or Christian) or in private practice.

In 2006, an agreement was reached with the Association of Canadian Chinese Theological Education (ACCTE) to establish the Canadian Chinese School of Theology (CCST) at Tyndale Seminary for the training of Mandarin-speaking students and pastors. This led to a long-term agreement, which was signed in 2012.

=== Centres ===
Tyndale University houses five centres: the Hudson Taylor Centre for Chinese Ministries, the Tyndale Centre for Leadership, the Tyndale Intercultural Ministries Centre, the Tyndale Family Life Centre, and the Tyndale Spiritual Formation Centre. The Hudson Taylor Centre for Chinese Ministries, named after Hudson Taylor, has a mission to advance Chinese ministries in North America and around the world. The Tyndale Centre for Leadership is mandated to foster the development of Canadian Christian leaders in congregational contexts, Christian organizations, the marketplace and public sectors. The Tyndale Intercultural Ministries Centre's mandate is to link a vast network of local churches, denominations and mission organizations, in partnership with church and para-church organizations by offering training seminars and professional development workshops. The Tyndale Family Life Centre offers professional counselling and supportive workshops for the larger community and members of the general public. The seminary is also home of the Tyndale Spiritual Formation Centre, including the Tyndale Association of Spiritual Directors.

== Accreditation ==
Tyndale University is fully accredited by the Association of Theological Schools in the United States and Canada to award its graduate theological degrees. The university is also accredited with the Ontario Ministry of Training, Colleges and Universities. Tyndale is an affiliate of the Council for Christian Colleges and Universities and the Christian Higher Education Canada (CHEC) association.

== Partners ==
The school is interdenominational and thus has various evangelical partner denominations.

== Controversy ==
Tyndale University was scheduled to have former President of the United States, George W. Bush, speak at a breakfast hosted by Prem Watsa of Fairfax Financial Holdings on September 20, 2011. According to Tyndale professor Craig Carter, Bush "was to speak on the role of faith-based institutions in the world of higher education." Upon learning of the scheduled event, a group of alumni launched a website protesting Tyndale's association with Bush. After two days of online protests, the event was canceled "due to a scheduling change" but no other explanation was given. Following the cancellation, former Tyndale president and vice chancellor Gary Nelson noted the need for Tyndale "to have clearer policies and guidelines in place so that diverse views can be expressed in a respectful and hospitable space." He also expressed regret that Tyndale "did not have such a framework in place" and stated that "Tyndale will continue to host various people to speak on issues that matter."

== Notable alumni ==
- Addie Aylestock, first female pastor in the British Methodist Episcopal Church, and first black woman ordained in Canada.
- Bruxy Cavey, former pastor and author
- Gino Reda (b. 1960), sports broadcaster and television personality
- Oswald J. Smith (1889–1986), pastor, author and missions advocate
- Ravi Zacharias (1946-2020), apologist and evangelist
- Wesley Huff, apologist and New Testament scholar
