= Muskoka Bible Centre =

Coordinates: 45.2664°N 79.2262°W

Muskoka Bible Centre (MBC, formerly known as Muskoka Baptist Conference) is a Christian conference and retreat centre on Mary Lake, south of Huntsville, Ontario. It is affiliated with the Fellowship of Evangelical Baptist Churches and operates Camp Widjiitiwin (a children's camp).

MBC was founded in 1930.

The conference centre is a family-friendly environment, and offers attractions such as tennis, mini-golf, children's programming, and a sandy beach. There is also a campground within the property of the centre.

John Freisan has been the CEO of Muskoka Bible Centre since 2009.
