= Wesley Huff =

Canadian Christian apologist and theologian

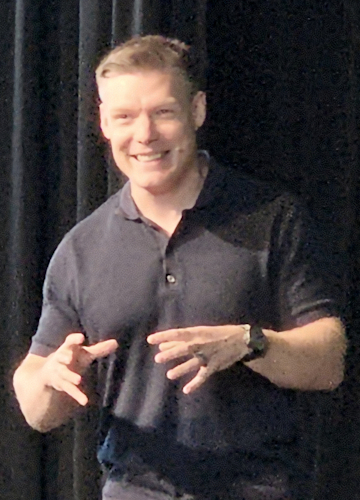
- Huff in 2025
- Born: February 24, 1991 (age 35); Multan, Pakistan
- Education: York University (BA in Sociology); Tyndale University (MA in Theological Studies); University of Toronto (PhD in New Testament, ongoing)
- Occupations: Apologist, theologian
- Children: 4
- Website: www.wesleyhuff.com

Wesley Livingstone Huff (born 1991) is a Canadian Christian apologist, Reformed Baptist theologian, and public speaker. Specializing in the history of ancient biblical manuscripts, Huff is currently pursuing a PhD in theological studies and sacred and canonical texts at Wycliffe College, University of Toronto. He has been recognized for his work in Christian apologetics and cultural engagement.

== Early life and education ==
Huff was born in Multan, Pakistan and spent his early years in the Middle East. At the age of eleven, Huff was diagnosed with a rare neurological condition, acute transverse myelitis, that left him paralyzed from the waist down. He experienced a recovery that he says doctors could not medically explain, an event that played a pivotal role in shaping his passion for ministry and theology.

Huff holds a bachelor's degree in sociology from York University, where he participated as a student athlete in track and field. He also earned a master's degree in theological studies from Tyndale University and is currently pursuing a PhD in theological studies and sacred and canonical texts (concentration: New Testament) at Wycliffe College, Toronto.

== Career ==
Since 2019, Huff has served as the Central Canada Director for Apologetics Canada, where he organizes and participates in public dialogues, debates, and interfaith events across North America.

Huff is a regular presenter at conferences, churches, and on university campuses, addressing topics such as the reliability of biblical manuscripts, theology, and cultural engagement. He also maintains a YouTube channel where he shares video content on biblical history, manuscript evidence, and apologetics, and he has been featured on podcasts, including The Joe Rogan Experience, Piers Morgan Uncensored, and Andrew Schulz's The Flagrant.

On March 8, 2026, Huff appeared on The Diary of a CEO with Steven Bartlett. In the podcast, Huff shared the evangelical gospel message surrounding the Protestant Reformation and the doctrine of sola fide (justification by faith alone), along with answering common objections to Christianity.

=== Plagiarism allegations ===
In early November 2026, biblical scholar Dan McClellan alleged that Huff had plagiarized the work of Florida pastor Brian J. Wright in a March 2016 paper for Tyndale Seminary, which had been uploaded to Academia.edu. In response to McClellan's allegations, Huff published a video featuring Wright, where Huff apologizes for a lack of academic integrity in his earlier work. The Roys Report noted that on a separate occasion, Huff might also have used the work of Biola University professor David I. Yoon and Australian Catholic University professor Stephen Carlson. Following further online controversy, Huff subsequently removed the video and briefly took down his website. In addition, a report arose that several months prior to McClellan's allegations, Huff had already been dropped by his doctoral supervisor at the University of Toronto over plagiarism concerns.

On November 19, Peterson Academy and Midwestern Baptist Theological Seminary each announced that they had ended partnerships with Huff. Later that day, Huff published a statement to his social media X account, confessing that

"I have plagiarized the work of others. This was wrong, and it was sinful. Over the years, I allowed myself to develop justifications for my actions, minimizing their seriousness and, at times, even pushing them so far from my mind that I failed to reckon with what I had done. These patterns have affected far more of my work than I ever wanted to acknowledge".

Huff also called his response video featuring Wright "defensive and dishonest."

== Personal life ==
Huff married his wife in 2015, and the couple have four children. He is related to David Livingstone.
