= Faith Today =

Canadian evangelical Christian magazine

- Categories: Christian magazine
- Frequency: Bimonthly
- Publisher: Evangelical Fellowship of Canada
- First issue: 1983
- Country: Canada
- Based in: Ontario
- Language: English
- Website: https://www.faithtoday.ca
- ISSN: 0832-1191

Faith Today is a Canadian evangelical Christian magazine published by the Evangelical Fellowship of Canada (EFC). Founded in 1983, it describes itself as a national hub for "Canada’s Christian conversation" and publishes feature journalism, commentary, and book reviews. The magazine is distributed in print and digital formats and is carried by platforms such as EBSCO, Flipster and library magazine directories.

== Background ==
Throughout its history, Faith Today has experienced several editorial shifts. In the 1980s, Brian Stiller, then EFC president, served for many years as editor-in-chief. He described the magazine as “the evangelical Maclean’s” due to its national scope and focus on leadership issues. In 1999, managing editor Marianne Meed Ward resigned following proposed changes to the magazine’s mission and editorial guidelines, which she argued conflicted with journalistic standards of presenting opposing viewpoints. In 2000, journalist Gail Reid was appointed editor as part of her role as EFC communications director.

Faith Today has also been cited in scholarship on Canadian evangelicalism, civil religion, and public theology.

== Distribution ==
Digital and print editions are available through the EFC and affiliated retailers. An archive of selected past issues is also hosted by Christian nonprofit partners such as Compassion Canada. Faith Today has been cited in Canadian religious media discussions about Christian journalism and media trustworthiness. Broadview magazine has referenced Faith Today in its retrospective reporting on Canadian Christian media history.

== See also ==
- Christianity in Canada
- Evangelicalism
