= Canadian Council of Churches =

Forum of Christian churches in Canada

The Canadian Council of Churches
- Founded: 1944; 82 years ago
- Location(s): 47 Queen’s Park Crescent East; Toronto, Ontario, Canada
- President: The Rev. Amanda Curry
- General Secretary: The Rev. Janet M. Anstead
- Website: councilofchurches.ca

The Canadian Council of Churches (French: Conseil canadien des Églises) is a broad and inclusive ecumenical body, now representing 26 member churches including Anglican; Eastern and Roman Catholic; Evangelical; Free Church; Eastern and Oriental Orthodox; and Historic Protestant traditions. Together these member churches represent 13,500 worshiping communities and comprise 85% of the Christians in Canada.

The Canadian Council of Churches was founded in 1944.

== Members and Friends of the Council ==
=== Member Churches ===
There are now 26 member churches in the Canadian Council of Churches:

- Anglican Church of Canada
- Apostolic Catholic Church (ACC) Canada
- Archdiocese of Canada of the Orthodox Church in America
- Armenian Holy Apostolic Church, Canadian Diocese
- Canadian Association for Baptist Freedoms (formerly called Atlantic Baptist Fellowship)
- British Methodist Episcopal Church (Associate Member)
- Canadian Baptists of Ontario and Quebec
- Canadian Baptists of Western Canada
- Canadian Conference of Catholic Bishops
- Canadian Yearly Meeting of the Religious Society of Friends
- Christian Church (Disciples of Christ) in Canada
- Christian Reformed Church in North America, Canada
- The Coptic Orthodox Church of Canada
- Ethiopian Orthodox Tewahedo Church of Canada
- Evangelical Lutheran Church in Canada
- Greek Orthodox Metropolis of Toronto
- Malankara Orthodox Syrian Church – Northeast American Diocese
- The Mar Thoma Syrian Church
- Mennonite Church Canada
- Polish National Catholic Church of Canada (Associate Member)
- Presbyterian Church in Canada
- Regional Synod of Canada - Reformed Church in America
- The Salvation Army
- Ukrainian Catholic Church
- Ukrainian Orthodox Church of Canada
- United Church of Canada

=== Affiliates ===
- Citizens for Public Justice
- Canadian Baptist Ministries
- The Canadian Bible Society
- The Gideons International in Canada
- Prairie Centre for Ecumenism
- A Rocha Canada
- Women's Inter-Church Council of Canada
- The Yonge Street Mission
- Church Council on Justice and Corrections

== Location, governance, and structure ==
=== Location and staff ===
The council, with headquarters in Toronto, is governed and supported by its members through a semi-annual Governing Board. The current General Secretary of the council is Pastor Peter Noteboom. Officers and staff of the council are drawn from the diversity of traditions represented by the member churches.

=== Governance ===
All member churches have representation in the council's Governing Board, which meets semi-annually to identify needs and direct the affairs of the council. The Governing Board discerns, coordinates, and communicates the common mission of the churches, long-range planning, and policy formation. It has oversight over all the bodies and activities of the council, as well as the relationship between or among commissions, reference groups, working groups, committees, and Project Ploughshares, the peace research institute of the council.

Between meetings of the Governing Board, the Executive Committee of the Council oversees the life of the Council offices between meetings of the Governing Board and helps ensure its decisions and policies are implemented.

=== Structure ===
The ecumenical work of the council is carried out across its various bodies:

- The Commission on Justice and Peace (CJP)
- The Sexual Exploitation Working Group (SEWG)
- The Commission on Faith and Witness (CFW)
- The Week of Prayer for Christian Unity (WPCU)
- Faith and Life Sciences Reference Group (FLSRG)
- Christian Interfaith Reference Group (CIRG)
- Forum for Intercultural Leadership and Learning (FILL)
- Canadian Ecumenical Anti-Racism Network (CEARN)
- Project Ploughshares

Although each body the council has a distinctive focus and lens, they aim to bring their unique voices to bear on priorities of shared concern (also known as Operating Guidelines) that are collectively identified at the start of each triennium. The Operating Guidelines for the 2021–24 Triennium are:

1. Joining and Inviting Young Adult Engagement
2. Practising Faith Sharing
3. Meeting Local Networks
4. Striving Toward Just Intercultural Community
5. Telling Our Stories

== Past work and contributions ==
Through the ecumenical movement, which arose in Canada in the twentieth century, The Canadian Council of Churches seeks unity for the divided church and seeks to remind Christians that they share Christ's mission for reconciliation, peace, dignity, and justice for the whole community.

Some of the work done by the Council and the Member Churches working together includes:

- Bringing member churches into encounter with one another in a forum where all voices hold equal weight. We promote understanding among them and with other Christian churches.
- The founding and sponsorship of Project Ploughshares, a leading Canadian peace organization.
- Providing a safe place for immigrant churches to learn about Canada and to put down roots.
- Undertaking and promoting theological study and reflection among Christian traditions.
- Encouraging and hosting churches' participation in dialogue with people of other faiths.
- Studying, speaking about and acting on conditions that involve moral and spiritual principles, including current events such as the war on terror and societal issues such as the future of health care.
- Sharing information broadly, communicating results of theological and ethical reflections to Canadian Society and governments.
- Producing resources, including material for the Week of Prayer for Christian Unity.
- Producing a bi-annual newsletter, Emmaus, and a periodic electronic newsletter entitled "Together"
- Providing material to chaplains in Canada's armed forces and prisons, helping them work with stress-related trauma, mixed marriages and questions about life and death.

== International participation ==
The Canadian Council of Churches is registered with the United Nations and participates in world conferences and commissions on such issues as funding for development, refugee settlement and human rights. The council is also a participant in the annual World Religious Leaders Summit, in parallel with the G8/G20 political summits each year. In 2010, the council also provided leadership for this event, when the international summit was hosted by Canada in Winnipeg, Manitoba.

== See also ==
- Canadian Council of Churches v. Canada (Minister of Employment and Immigration)
- National Council of Churches (USA)
- World Council of Churches
