= Pentecostal Assemblies of Newfoundland and Labrador =

- Classification: Finished Work Pentecostalism
- Orientation: Protestant
- Associations: World Assemblies of God Fellowship; Evangelical Fellowship of Canada
- Origin: 1910
- Official website: www.paonl.ca

The Pentecostal Assemblies of Newfoundland and Labrador (PAONL) is a Finished Work Pentecostal denomination in the Canadian province of Newfoundland and Labrador. It is one of four Canadian branches of the World Assemblies of God Fellowship, the largest Pentecostal denomination in the world. The denomination claims approximately 117 affiliated churches. The PAONL has a close relationship to the Pentecostal Assemblies of Canada, its sister denomination within the World AG Fellowship, and is a member of the Evangelical Fellowship of Canada.

== History ==
The PAONL traces its beginnings to the ministry of Pentecostal evangelist Alice Belle Garrigus from Rockville, Connecticut. In 1911, she founded the Bethesda Pentecostal Church in St. John's. By 1925, the number of Pentecostals and churches had grown enough to receive legal recognition from the Newfoundland government.

In 1927 Eugene Vaters (1898-1984) became the denomination’s General Superintendent, a position he held for 35 years. The PAONL comprised a handful of churches when Vaters took office, but by the time he retired the number of churches had increased to 115. Some of the best-known ministries of the PAONL commenced under Vaters. For example, he initiated Good Tidings, the official magazine, and Religious Book & Bible House (RBBH), the denomination’s retail division. Much of the literature and printing/publishing needs for the PAONL is met by Good Tidings Press, located at 57 Thorburn Road in St. John’s. The site also houses the main offices of the PAONL, the administrative centre for the denomination.

Until 1949, Newfoundland and Labrador was a separate dominion from Canada, and the PAON developed separately from the Pentecostal Assemblies of Canada. Nevertheless, the two organizations share a common statement of faith and cooperate closely in overseas mission work. The two groups also share the Eastern Pentecostal Bible College in Peterborough, Ontario.

== Denominational School System ==
When Newfoundland joined Canada in 1949, the province entered with what is known as Term 17 in the Terms of Union. This constitutional provision guaranteed denominational educational rights to certain Christian denominations: Anglicans, Roman Catholics, United (Protestant), Salvation Army, Seventh-Day Adventists, and others. Initially, the Pentecostal Assemblies of Newfoundland were not among the denominations with constitutionally protected rights under Term 17. Over time, the Pentecostal community pressed for recognition. In 1987, Term 17 was amended to extend to the Pentecostal Assemblies the same rights and privileges "with respect to denominational schools and denominational colleges" as held by the other denomination.

Under the Schools Act, 1997 and subsequent legislation, Newfoundland and Labrador now operates a single public school system. Religious education (non-denominational) and religious observances are allowed under certain conditions—typically where parents request them—rather than being overseen by denominational school boards. The Pentecostal denomination, and all other religious denominations, no longer directly runs its own separate publicly funded schools under its own school board structure, although churches still have influence (for example, via property ownership or input in symbolic or religious matters in some contexts).
