= Evangelical Baptist Seminary of Quebec =

Baptist theological training school in Montreal, Quebec, Canada

- Séminaire Baptiste Évangélique du Québec
- Type: Private
- Established: 1974
- Affiliations: Association of Evangelical Baptist Churches in Quebec (Fellowship of Evangelical Baptist Churches in Canada)
- President: François Turcotte
- Location: Montreal, Quebec, Canada; 45.6136°N 73.5247°W
- Website: www.sembeq.qc.ca

Evangelical Baptist Seminary of Quebec or Séminaire Baptiste Évangélique du Québec (SEMBEQ), is a French-language Baptist theological training school headquartered in Montreal, Quebec (Canada). It is affiliated with the Association of Evangelical Baptist Churches in Quebec (Fellowship of Evangelical Baptist Churches in Canada).

== History ==
SEMBEQ was founded in 1974 by the Association of Evangelical Baptist Churches of Quebec (AEBEQ, Association d'Églises baptistes évangéliques au Québec). The seminary was started by William (Bill) Phillips, Elisée Beau, and Jacques Alexanian in order to meet the need within Quebec to train local Baptist pastors (at the time, most theological education in Quebec was strictly Catholic). Sixty-five student registered for the first official course, The Gospel of Mark. By the school year of 1980–1981, the seminary offered 7 courses, attended by 130 students from 17 churches. In 1984, SEMBEQ awarded its first bachelor's degree, with a master program starting in 1990.

== Programs ==
SEMBEQ offers classes in theology, Bible, and ministry practices (such as counseling and church leadership). Most courses are offered within local evangelical churches, in order to facilitate the practical emphasis of the instruction. SEMBEQ also offers a publishing service to facilitate the printing of French-language theology and ministry materials. SEMBEQ Magazine is published quarterly, with the first edition appearing in the summer of 2015.

== Affiliations ==
=== AEBEQ/Fellowship of Evangelical Baptist Churches in Canada ===
SEMBEQ is affiliated with the Association of Evangelical Baptist Churches in Québec (AEBEQ), a group of churches in Quebec and neighbouring Ontario and New Brunswick. SEMBEQ and AEBEQ are affiliated with the Fellowship of Evangelical Baptist Churches in Canada.

=== Mission Quebec ===
SEMBEQ is affiliated with Mission Quebec, an organization that has a mission to strengthen and equip churches, as well as plant new churches and share the gospel. SEMBEQ and Mission Quebec work closely together, with the shared goal of training missionaries who can share the gospel in the province.

=== Northwest Seminary ===
SEMBEQ has recently entered into a partnership with Northwest Baptist Seminary in order to offer the training program Immerse to leaders of Quebecois churches.
