= Brian Stiller =

Brian C. Stiller
- Born: 1942 (age 83–84)

Brian C. Stiller (born 1942) is Global Ambassador of the World Evangelical Alliance, the global association which represents some 600 million Evangelical Protestants. He is the author of fourteen books.

== Education ==
Stiller was raised in a Pentecostal minister's home on the prairies. Educated at the University of Toronto (BA in History), Wycliffe College (M. Rel), Gordon-Conwell Theological Seminary (Doctor of Ministry), he has received honorary doctorates from Briercrest College and Trinity Western University.

== Career ==
During the 1960s, Stiller worked with youth, first as director of Youth for Christ in Montreal, then Toronto YFC, and finally as President of Youth For Christ Canada.

In 1983, he was appointed President of the Evangelical Fellowship of Canada. This provided him with a national profile as a voice for people of biblical faith. Within months of his appointment, he founded and became editor-in-chief of EFC's national magazine, Faith Today. By way of weekly television (including Cross Currents on Vision TV), as well as other media, his opinions and views of issues of moral concern were sought.

In 1997, he left EFC to become President of Tyndale University College & Seminary; the school had gone through a major restructuring. During his tenure, Tyndale became a university, purchased a 56-acre campus from the Sisters of St. Joseph and expanded as Canada's largest seminary. In 2009 Stiller retired from his presidency at Tyndale and was named president of the Tyndale Foundation. July, 2011 he began as Global Ambassador with the World Evangelical Alliance (WEA).

== Bibliography ==
- "From Jerusalem to Timbuktu" (2018) published by InterVarsity Press
- "An Insider's Guide to Praying for the World" (2016) published by Bethany
- "Evangelicals Around the World: A Global Handbook for the 21st Century" (2015) General Editor, published by Thomas Nelson
- Find A Broken Wall: 7 Ancient Principles for 21st Century Leaders (2012), published by Castle Quay Books Canada;
- Preaching Parables to Postmoderns (2005), published by Fortress Press;
- Jesus and Caesar - Christians in the Public Square (2003) published by Castle Quay Books Canada;
- What Happens When I Die?: A Promise of the Afterlife (2001) published by HarperCollins;
- When Life Hurts - A Three Fold Path to Healing (1999) (HarperCollins), and Herald Press;
- From the Tower of Babel to Parliament Hill: How to be a Christian in Canada today (1997) (HarperCollins);
- Don't Let Canada Die By Neglect - and other essays ();
- Was Canada Ever Christian? - and other essays (1996) published by FT Publications;
- Life Gifts - The Real Story of Organ Transplants (by Dr. Calvin R. Stiller, M.D., with Brian C. Stiller) (1990) published by Stoddart;
- Critical Options for evangelicals (1990);
- A Generation Under Siege (1983);
