= First Baptist Church (Toronto) =

- First Baptist Church
- 43.6546°N 79.3963°W
- Location: Toronto, Ontario
- Denomination: Baptist
- Website: https://www.fbctoronto.ca/

History
- Founded: 1826

Administration
- Division: Canadian Baptists of Ontario and Quebec

First Baptist Church is a Baptist congregation in Toronto, Ontario, affiliated with Canadian Baptists of Ontario and Quebec. It is both the first Baptist congregation in Toronto and the oldest black institution in the city. Formed by fugitive enslaved persons, the church played a large role in the abolitionist movement, including hosting lectures against slavery and offering aid to fugitives.

In its long history, the church's location has changed multiple times. Today it holds service at 101 Huron Street.

== History ==
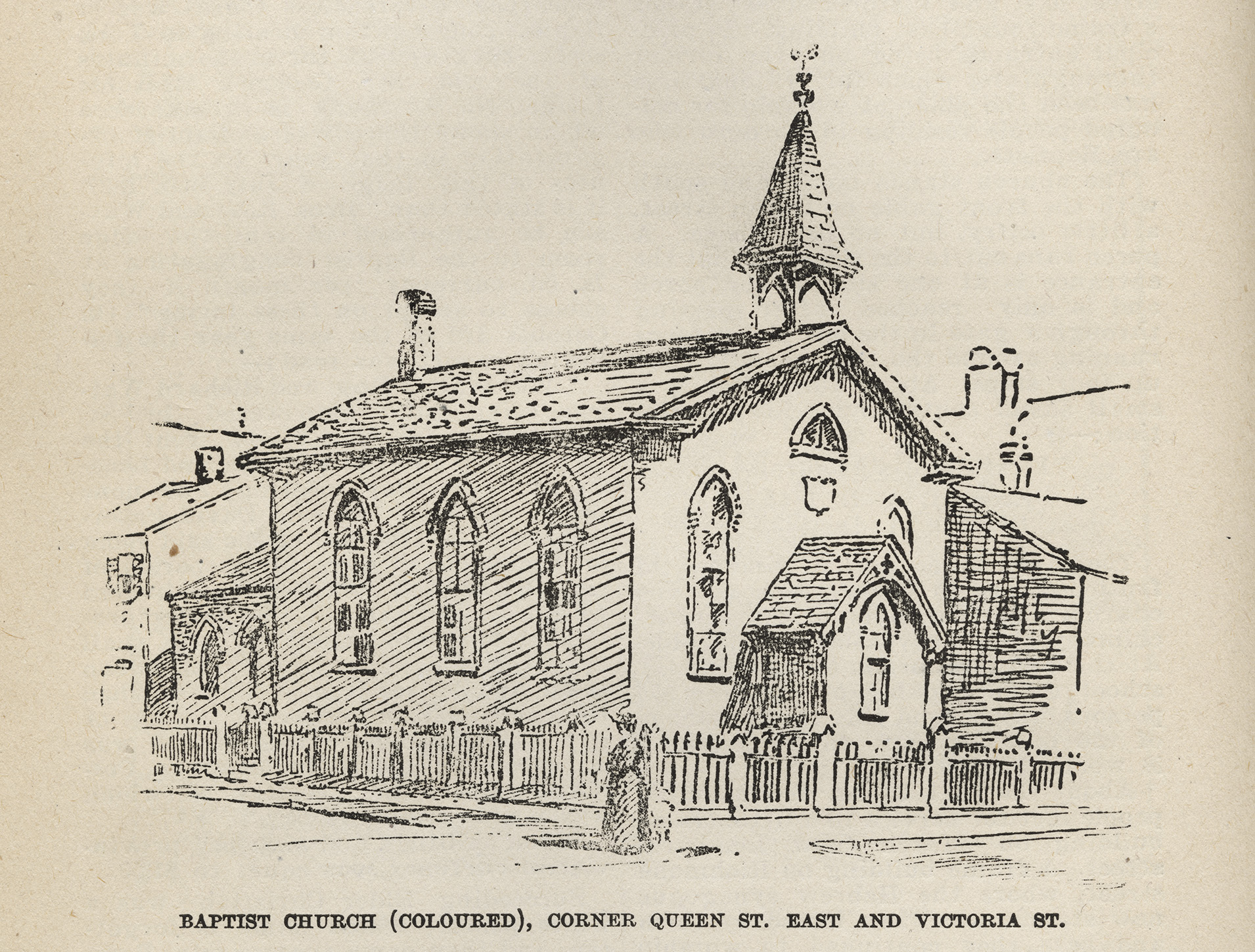
Queen and Victoria location (1841 to 1905).

The church was formed by 12 fugitive enslaved persons in 1826, under the leadership of Elder Washington Christian. Reverend Christian was a former enslaved individual who established multiple Baptist churches in Canada.

It had not been possible to attend existing white churches because the fugitives were required to have a letter from their old church and to pay their old slave masters for the money lost due to their escape.

At first, services were held outside or in the homes of members of the church. Reverend Christian rented a masonic temple in 1827. Although some white congregants attended the black church's services, a church for white members was established in 1829.

There were reportedly 66 members of the First Baptist Church in 1837. In the same year, a visitor noted that half the congregation was white, half was black.

In 1841, the congregation moved to its first permanent location after being gifted land by the family of Squires McCutcheon to build a church at Queen Street and Victoria Street. Soon after, white members left for a different Baptist church. In 1843, Elder Washington Christian went to Jamaica for two years, returning with enough raised funds to pay off the new church's mortgage. The location was known as "First Coloured Calvinistic Baptist Church" or "Queen Street Coloured Baptist Church."

In 1905, it relocated to University Avenue and Edward Street, at which point it was known as "University Avenue Baptist Church".

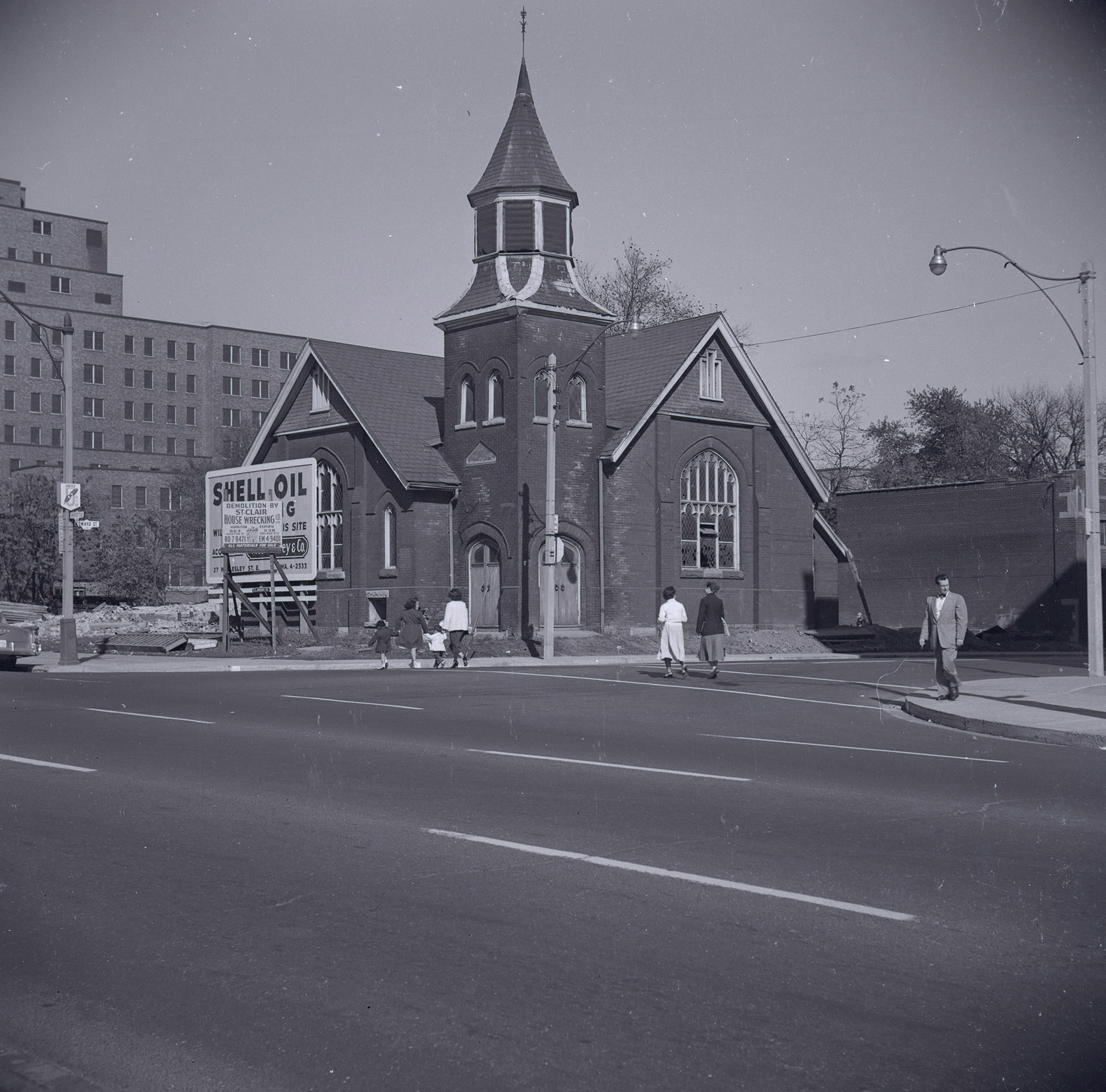
University Avenue and Edward location (1905 to 1955). Shown here shortly before demolition.

The name "First Baptist Church" began being used in the 1940s.

The church relocated to its current address at Huron Street and D'Arcy Street in 1955. The previous property was sold to Shell Oil Company and the building was demolished.

In 2000, baptized membership was approximately 140 and about the same number attended Sunday church services.

=== Locations ===
Year	Location
1826	No building (service was outside or in congregants' homes).
1827	Rented St. George's Masonic Lodge.
1834	Rented building on March Street (now Lombard Street).
1841	Church building at Queen Street and Victoria Street.
1905	Church building at University Avenue and Edward Street.
1955	Church building at Huron Street and D'Arcy Street (its current location).

,
