= Mary Lake (Ontario) =

Lake in Muskoka District Municipality, Ontario, Canada

- Location within Ontario
- Location: Muskoka District Municipality, Ontario
- Coordinates: 45.2378°N 79.2618°W
- Basin countries: Canada
- Surface area: 1,065.5 ha (2,633 acres)
- Average depth: 24.6 m (81 ft)
- Max. depth: 56.3 m (185 ft)
- Surface elevation: 280.7 m (921 ft)
- Islands: 8

Mary Lake is a lake located in the District Municipality of Muskoka in Ontario, Canada. The town of Port Sydney is located at its southern end. The lake was named by surveyor Alexander Murray after his daughter Mary Ellen Murray in 1853. Both ends of the lake are connected with the North Muskoka River.

== Attractions ==
Muskoka Bible Centre is a religious conference centre located on the north end of the lake. Opened as a Baptist retreat in 1931, it replaced a youth camp at Fisher's Glen on Lake Erie in 1930.

Cottages along the lake limit public access to a few points:

- Mary Lake Marina - a private family owned business located on the northwest side of the lake. It provides paid public access to waters.
- Port Sydney Beach - a public beach managed by the town of Huntsville. The dock and waters are the responsibility of Fisheries and Oceans Canada.

== Islands ==
The islands are believed to be former volcanic pipes from an ancient mountain.

Some of the eight islands are occupied and private:

- Bonner Island
- Crown Island - the largest of the eight and referred to by First Nations as Kche-negeek-chiching, or ‘Place of the Great Otter’ and later named for settler Edward Crown
- Dead Man's Island - named for settler Captain Cock
- Gall Island - name source unknown and locally referred to as Buckhorn Island, after Buckhorn Point, directly across from island
- Lawrence Island - named for local settler William John Lawrence
- Rocky Island
- Forrest Island - acquired by British merchant Thomas Rumball but settled by son Charles Rumball (1825-1894), which gave the island's original name Rumball's, later as known as Snowshoe, and lastly by heir of current family to own it William Duncan Forrest; located southwest of Dead Man's Island
- Isle of Pines - named for pines covering the island

== Fish Species ==
- Lake trout
- Lake whitefish
- Northern pike
- Smallmouth bass
- Largemouth bass
- Walleye
- Burbot
- Brook trout
- Black crappie

== See also ==
- List of lakes in Ontario
