= Alice Belle Garrigus =

Alice Belle Garrigus (August 2, 1858 in Rockville, Connecticut – August 30, 1949 in Clarke's Beach, Newfoundland) was a Pentecostal evangelist and the founder of the Pentecostal Assemblies of Newfoundland and Labrador, the largest Pentecostal denomination in the province.

She spent the first half of her life in various locations in New England; she studied at Mount Holyoke Female Seminary (later Mount Holyoke College) and worked as a school teacher. She was raised an Episcopalian, later joined the Congregational Church, which she served for a time as an itinerant preacher, and in 1907 converted to Pentecostalism.

During 1906, Garrigus reread the Bible and earnestly sought to understand what made Jesus’ disciples different following the Day of Pentecost. Around this same time, she heard about the revival taking place at the Azusa Street Mission in Los Angeles.

In 1907, at a Christian and Missionary Alliance camp meeting at Old Orchard, Maine, she met Frank Bartleman, a veteran of the Azusa Street revival and an unofficial chronicler of the Pentecostal movement. Bartleman “stood for hours,” wrote Garrigus, “telling us of the deeper things of God.” After he left the camp meeting, Garrigus, Minnie Draper, and others met in an old barn to pray, and there Alice Belle Garrigus received the baptism in the Holy Spirit. She continued preaching at Rumney and Grafton, Massachusetts, and other places, but began feeling impressed to found a mission in St. John's, Newfoundland and Labrador.

She resumed preaching, and over the next couple of years received, she claimed, messages from "mysterious strangers" and directly from God that she should found a mission in St. John's.

Together with a missionary couple, she travelled to Newfoundland, arriving in St. John's in December 1910. The three established the "Bethesda Mission" and began their work in 1911. In 1912, her co-preachers left Newfoundland for health reasons, leaving Garrigus in charge.

The Pentecostal movement grew quite slowly during its first decade. Garrigus, not known for her organizational strengths, did not expand the movement outside the St. John's area. The main thrusts of her preaching were personal salvation through Christ, and his imminent, apocalyptic return to Earth.

After a crusade in 1919 by the evangelist Victoria Booth-Clibborn Demarest, interest in Pentecostalism increased. New converts started their own personal missions, and one of these, Robert C. English, eventually became co-pastor with Garrigus of the Bethesda Mission. The Pentecostal Assemblies of Newfoundland was incorporated in 1925. Garrigus subsequently joined forces with Eugene Vaters, a Pentecostal pastor who had once studied for the Methodist ministry. This led to Vaters replacing English as the head of the movement. The Pentecostal Assemblies of Newfoundland and Labrador grew tremendously under the leadership of Eugene Vaders.

Alice Garrigus remained in Newfoundland for the rest of her life; she continued to be a principal figure in the Pentecostal movement. Many churches in the PAONL today trace their roots to her ministry.
