= La Chapelle (Canada) =

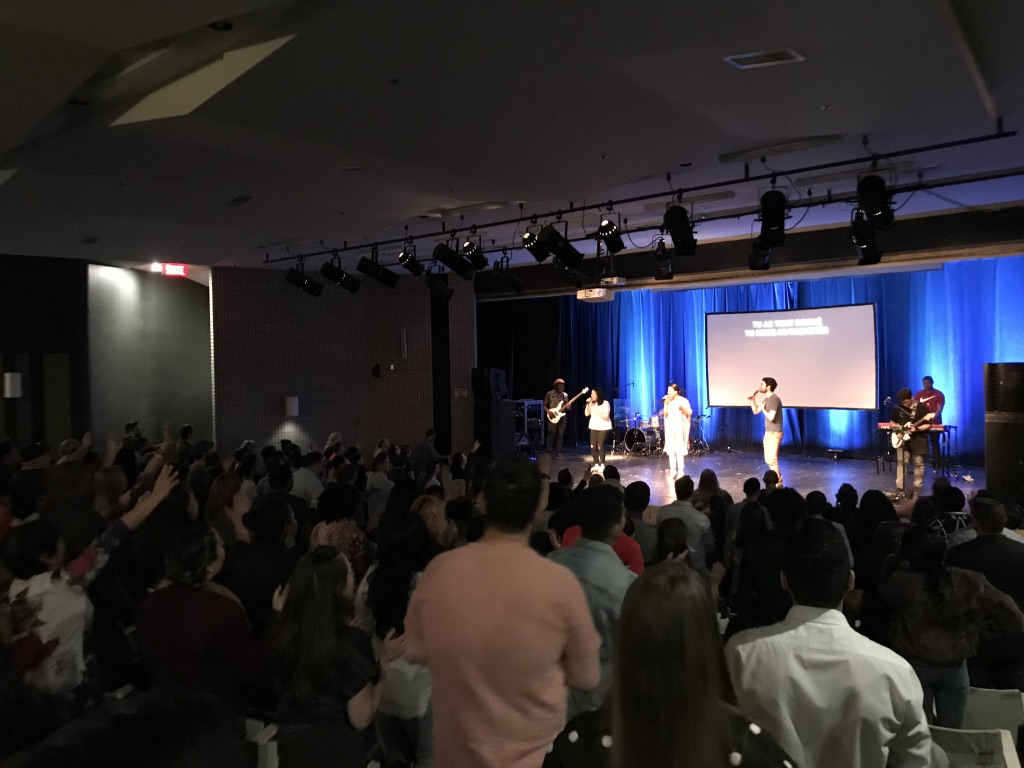
- Worship service in 2019
- Location: Montreal
- Country: Canada
- Denomination: Baptist
- Website: lachapelle.me

History
- Founded: 2013
- Founder: David Pothier

Architecture
- Style: Contemporary/Modern

La Chapelle is a Baptist Evangelical multi-site church based in Montreal, Quebec, in Canada. It is affiliated with Canadian National Baptist Convention. Its senior pastor is David Pothier.

== History ==
The church was founded in 2013 by Pastor David Pothier. In 2014, it had 750 people. In 2018, the church had 5 services and 1,500 people. In 2025, it had opened 4 campuses in different cities in Quebec.

== Beliefs ==
The Church is a member of the Canadian National Baptist Convention.

== Social Programs ==
The Church founded the organization "J'aime ma ville", which offers, among other things, a food bank, a sponsorship program for newcomers and weeks of involvement in the community.

== See also ==
- List of the largest evangelical churches
- List of the largest evangelical church auditoriums
