= Canadian Baptist Theological Seminary and College =

Baptist institution in Alberta, Canada

Coordinates: 51.2070°N 114.4837°W

- Motto: To train God-called men and women for twenty-first century leadership in tough places
- Established: July 1987
- Affiliations: Canadian National Baptist Convention, Association for Biblical Higher Education, Association of Theological Schools in the United States and Canada
- President: Rob Blackaby
- Dean: Steve Booth
- Location: Cochrane, Alberta, Canada
- Website: cbtsc.ca

Canadian Baptist Theological Seminary and College is a Baptist university-level institution in Cochrane, Alberta, Canada, founded in July 1987. It offers both graduate theological programs and undergraduate programs. CSBS&C is affiliated with the Canadian National Baptist Convention (CNBC).

== History ==
The seminary was founded in 1987 as Canadian Southern Baptist Seminary and College in Cochrane, Alberta, by the Canadian National Baptist Convention. In 1996, an undergraduate college program was established. In 2013, a four-year bachelor's degree program was added. It is accredited by the Province of Alberta, Association of Theological Schools, and Association of Biblical Higher Education. In 2022, the school was renamed Canadian Baptist Theological Seminary and College.
