= Feller College =

Coordinates: 45.22217°N 73.304125°W

Feller College, also known as Institut Feller, was a boarding school and a Bible college located in Grande-Ligne (now Saint-Blaise-sur-Richelieu) which closed its doors in 1967.

== History ==
It was founded in 1836 by Henriette Feller of Lausanne, a Swiss Protestant missionary, in the small farming community of Grande-Ligne, 35 miles southeast of Montreal, Quebec). It grew to become a significant co-educational institution with imposing four-story central building and adjoining church, farm, and several faculty homes. In 1849, the mission and the school became partners with the Canadian Baptist Missionary Society. The school produced many French-speaking Baptist ministers, and many of its graduates, both francophones and anglophones, went on to become well known in diverse fields in Canada.

== Second World War ==
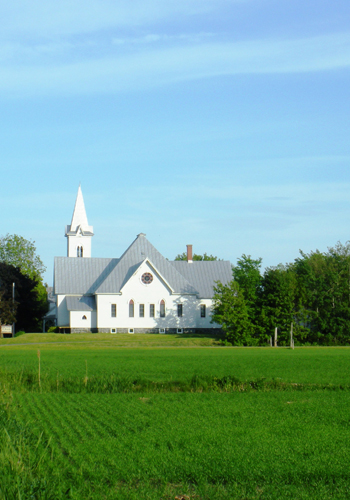
Memorial Roussy Baptist Church.

Feller ceased operations as a school during the Second World War (1942–1946) and was used as a prisoner-of-war camp. It reopened shortly after the war. After the war Feller accepted many English-speaking students and enjoyed considerable success as a truly bilingual institution. At the same time, its board had to face the problem of redefining its original mission. Ultimately it was unable to adapt to the new realities, and it closed in June 1967.

== Hostel ==
The main four-story grey stone building was last used in the summer of 1967 as a hostel for visitors to Montreal's World's Fair: Expo 67. In December 1968 it burned down. The school church was spared the fire and is still open to the public.
