= Northwest Baptist Convention =

The Northwest Baptist Convention (NBC) is a group of churches affiliated with the Southern Baptist Convention located in the Northwest United States (Washington, Oregon, and the panhandle of Idaho). Headquartered in Vancouver, Washington, the convention is made up of 15 Baptist associations and around 480 churches as of 2010.

The group was at one point called the Baptist General Convention of Oregon-Washington, but has changed its name since the 1950s.

== Affiliated organizations ==
- The Northwest Baptist Witness - the newspaper of the Northwest Baptist Convention
- The Northwest Baptist Historical Society
- Northwest Baptist Foundation
