= Canadian Baptists of Ontario and Quebec =

Baptist denomination in Canada

- Classification: Evangelicalism
- Theology: Baptist
- Associations: Canadian Baptist Ministries; Evangelical Fellowship of Canada; Canadian Council of Churches
- Headquarters: Etobicoke, Toronto, Ontario
- Origin: 1880 (as the "Baptist Union of Canada")
- Congregations: 290
- Members: 28,000+
- Official website: www.baptist.ca

Canadian Baptists of Ontario and Quebec (CBOQ) is a Baptist Christian denomination in central Canada. The organization's headquarters is based in Etobicoke, Toronto, Ontario, Canada. CBOQ is a partner of Canadian Baptist Ministries.

== History ==
In 1880, a Baptist Union of Canada was formed. Since the churches were located chiefly in the central provinces, the name was changed in 1888 to Baptist Convention of Ontario and Quebec (BCOQ). In 1927 the Fundamentalist–Modernist Controversy resulted in 77 churches being penalized by the Convention and asked to leave the Convention. Due to involuntary removal of the affiliation with the Convention, the 77 churches were forming the Union of Regular Baptist Churches – out of which the current Fellowship of Evangelical Baptist Churches in Canada emerged in 1953. In 1944, the CBOQ joined with the United Baptist Convention of the Maritimes and the Baptist Union of Western Canada to form the Canadian Baptist Federation. It was renamed in 2008 to "Canadian Baptists of Ontario and Quebec" (CBOQ) to better align with other Baptist groups in Canada: i.e. Canadian Baptists of Western Canada.

CBOQ meets annually at Assembly, electing officers, addressing issues, and offering workshops. According to its mission statement, "CBOQ exist to equip our churches and leaders to engage in their mission from God in their community." The Canadian Baptist is a monthly e-newsletter and annual magazine that is published by the CBOQ. CBOQ's affiliated seminary is McMaster Divinity College, a part of McMaster University in Hamilton, Ontario.

CBOQ provides practical and spiritual support to its family of churches and leaders through resources, workshops, prayer and regular gatherings. Through a grant program, CBOQ also supports a variety of ministries geared toward helping the most marginalized in society.

== Statistics ==
As of 2026, the CBOQ has 290 churches and over 28,000 members.

== Beliefs ==
The association has a Baptist confession of faith. CBOQ is a member of Canadian Baptist Ministries, Evangelical Fellowship of Canada and Canadian Council of Churches.

== Sources ==
- Baptists Around the World, by Albert W. Wardin, Jr.
- The Baptist Heritage: Four Centuries of Baptist Witness, by H. Leon McBeth
