= Canadian Baptist Ministries =

Religious organization in Canada

- Ministères baptistes canadiens
- Abbreviation: CBM, MBC
- Classification: Mainline Protestantism
- Theology: Baptist
- Associations: Baptist World Alliance
- Region: Canada
- Headquarters: Mississauga, Ontario, Canada
- Origin: 1944; Saint John, New Brunswick
- Congregations: 912
- Members: 70,616
- Other name: Canadian Baptist Federation
- Official website: cbmin.org

Canadian Baptist Ministries (CBM; French: Ministères baptistes canadiens, abbreviated MBC) has been the official mission agency of Canadian Baptists since 1874. CBM works in partnership with local churches around the world to evangelize. Across 30 countries, CBM equips partners to build the church, promote justice, address poverty, support kids at risk, and respond to crises. The CBM headquarters is located in Mississauga, Ontario.

Canadian Baptists are a mainline Protestant and Baptist denomination in Canada, made up of regional and historic partners. It is a member of the Baptist World Alliance.

Canadian Baptists make up approximately 900 churches, organized as the Canadian Baptists of Western Canada, Canadian Baptists of Ontario and Quebec, French Baptist Union (Union D’Eglises Baptistes Francophone Du Canada), and Canadian Baptists of Atlantic Canada. These organizations frequently partner with one another and Canadian Baptist Ministries for local, regional and global evangelical outreach.

== Historical background ==
The first Baptist church in present-day Canada was founded by an American Baptist minister in Sackville, New Brunswick, in 1763. More churches were founded throughout Nova Scotia, New Brunswick, Lower Canada, and Upper Canada by Loyalist American ministers and itinerant preachers.

=== Missionary activity and Canadian auxiliary ===
The first Canadian-born Baptist missionary was Rev. Samuel S. Day. He was sent to India in 1835 by the Baptist Board for Foreign Missions (BBFM), the foreign missionary organization of the American Triennial Convention (now American Baptist Churches USA). Canadian Baptist churches in the Maritime provinces had been supporting the work of Adoniram Judson in Burma since 1814. In 1845, these churches, before establishing the Baptist Convention of the Maritime Provinces (MBC), sent out Rev. R.E. Burpee, along with his wife Laleah, to Burma, under the auspices of the BBFM.

In 1866, the Foreign Missions Board, renamed as American Baptist Missionary Union (ABMU) right after the Southern schism, appointed A.V. Timpany to be sent to India. That prompted the establishment of a Canadian auxiliary to the American Missionary Union by the Maritime Provinces Convention in 1866.

In 1869, the Canadian auxiliary was reorganized as the Regular Baptist Foreign Missionary Society of Canada, and in 1889 was renamed as The Board of Foreign Missions of the Regular Baptist Convention of Ontario and Quebec.

In 1874, the Canadian Baptist Foreign Missionary Society was founded in Ontario.

== Founding ==
=== Precedents ===
The Canadian Baptist Foreign Mission Board (CBFMB) was founded in 1912. It was renamed as Canadian Baptist Overseas Missions Board (CBOMB) on May 1, 1970, and later as Canadian Baptist International Ministries (CBIM) in 1990.

Efforts to form a national Baptist ecclesiastical body date back to 1900. Delegates from across Canada met in Winnipeg and established the National Baptist Convention of Canada. Inexplicably, the Convention never met again. As such, no national Baptist organization existed in Canada for a long time until 1944. In that year, the Baptist Federation of Canada (BFC) was established at Saint John, New Brunswick by the Canadian Baptists of Ontario and Quebec (CBOQ), the Canadian Baptists of Western Canada (CBWC), and the Canadian Baptists of Atlantic Canada (CBAC). They were joined by the Union of French Baptist Churches of Canada in 1970.

In 1947, the CBOQ authorized the ordination of women ministers and Muriel Spurgeon Carder was the first ordained woman. In the CBAC, Josephine Moore was the first in 1954. In the CBWC, Mae Benedict was the first in 1959.

The Baptist Federation was renamed as Canadian Baptist Federation (CBF) in 1982.

In 1995, the Canadian Baptist International Ministries joined the Canadian Baptist Federation. The merger led to the Federation's current name, Canadian Baptist Ministries. Canadian Baptist Ministries is not the national denomination; it is the official mission agency of the Canadian Baptists.

[1] CBWC, CBOQ, and CBAC are organized regionally. The mission of the FBU extends across the country among French-speaking Canadians.

[2] CBM has been the official mission agency of the Canadian Baptists since 1874.

Historically, Canadian Baptists have been more organized in their international mission efforts; their vision to work together on national initiatives spans more than a century. This culminated in the formation of the Canadian Baptist Federation in 1944. This partnership of the regional Baptist bodies provided opportunity to strengthen the fellowship among the churches, provide a common voice on emerging societal issues, develop a shared hymnal and resources for worship along with a national publication. A resource for worship and service for pastoral leaders, was revised as Common Expressions and continues to have wide usage among Canadian Baptist leaders. The Federation’s relief and development agency, The Sharing Way was highly effective in its mission to alleviate human suffering globally.

The Baptist Federation merged in 1995 with Canadian Baptist International Ministries to form the single entity Canadian Baptist Ministries, with the DNA of integral mission - the gospel, expressed in both word and deed. CBM continues to partner with the regional bodies for ministry in Canada and across the globe. Today, the national focus is captured through the Canadian Baptist Partners Agreement highlighting priorities for engagement. A Canadian Baptist National Convenor has been in place since 2024.

== Statistics ==
According to a census published by the Baptist World Alliance, CBM claimed 912 churches and 70,616 members.

== Humanitarian aid ==
CBM support humanitarian projects in Canada and worldwide.

It engages in international mission on behalf of Canadian Baptist churches and brokers national cooperation among the four regional denominations and Women's groups.

== Regions ==
Canadian Baptists have 4 regional (historic) unions of churches: Canadian Baptists of Ontario and Quebec, Canadian Baptists of Western Canada, the Canadian Baptists of Atlantic Canada and Union d'Églises baptistes francophones du Canada.

== Schools ==
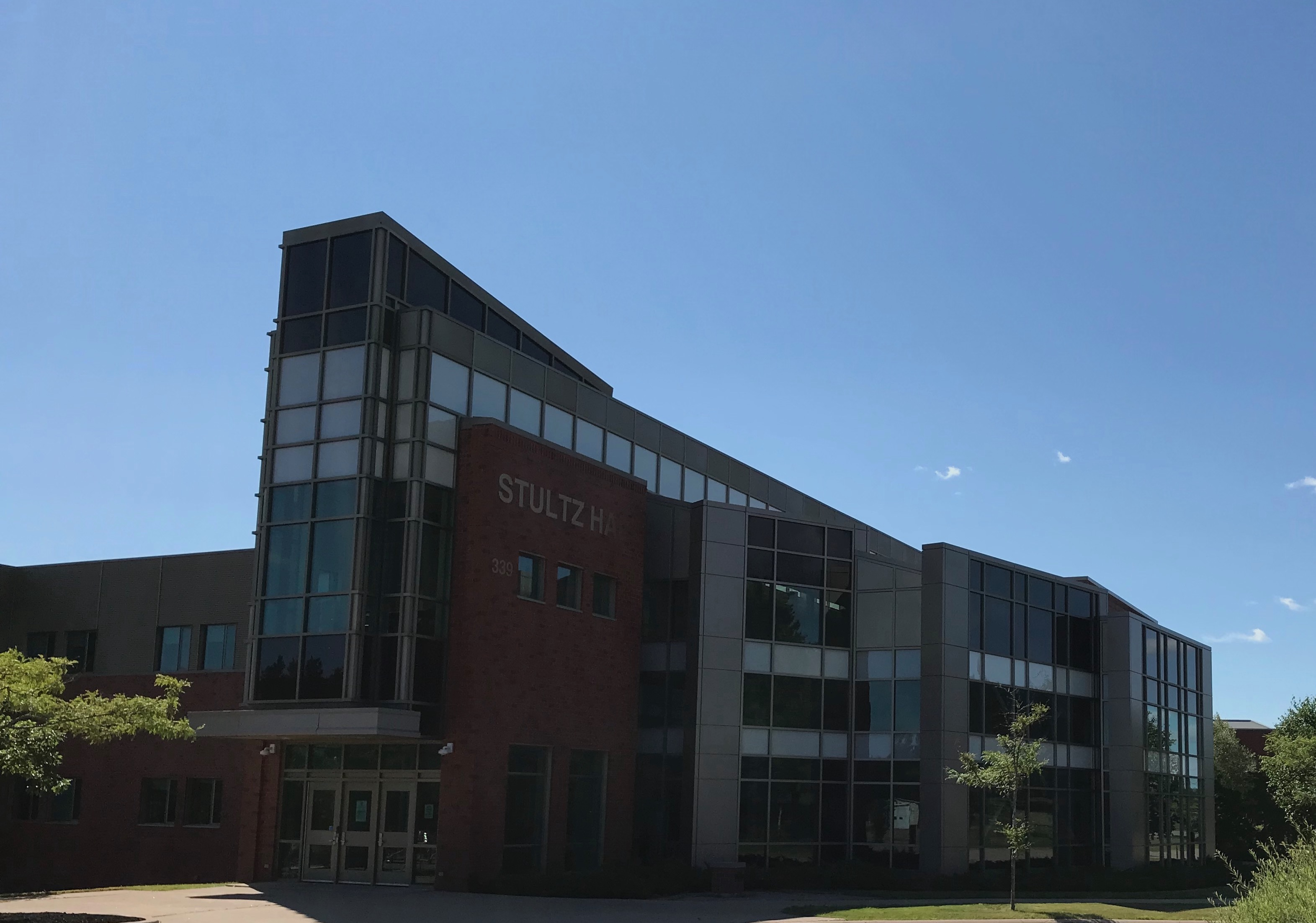
Stultz Hall, Crandall University in Moncton.

The regional conventions of the convention have participated in the founding of various universities which have gone public. There was the founding of Acadia University by the Canadian Baptists of Atlantic Canada in 1838, the founding of McMaster University by the Canadian Baptists of Ontario and Quebec in 1881 and Brandon University by the Canadian Baptists of Western Canada in 1890.

The organization has several theological institutes affiliated and a partner university, Crandall University.

== Beliefs ==
The Federation has a Baptist confession of faith. It is affiliated with the Baptist World Alliance.

== Controversies ==
In 1919, when an anonymous editorial in the Canadian Baptist contested the doctrine of Biblical inerrancy, pastor Thomas Todhunter Shields presented a strong condemnatory resolution to the annual convention. Shields's strong motion passed. In 1920 Shields was elected to the Board of Governors at McMaster University. In 1925, Shields took action against McMaster University in Toronto for harboring the English liberal theology professor Laurance Henry Marshall, a self-confessed "liberal evangelical", who was appointed Professor of Practical Theology at McMaster. In the spring of 1926 Shields established Toronto Baptist Seminary and was censured by the Baptists convention of Ontario and Québec in 1926, and was expelled in 1927. He took with him 70 churches (representing about one seventh of the convention) and one college, and formed the Union of Regular Baptist Churches of Ontario and Quebec in 1928. The Union merged with the Fellowship of Independent Baptist Churches to form the Fellowship of Evangelical Baptist Churches in Canada in 1953.

== See also ==
- Canadian Baptist Mission
- McMaster Divinity College, Hamilton, Ontario
- Carey Theological College, Vancouver
- Convention of Baptist Churches of Northern Circars
- Andhra Christian Theological College, Andhra Pradesh, India
- Baptists in Canada
