= Evangelical Fellowship of Canada =

Canadian church association

- Founded: 1964; 62 years ago
- Type: Evangelical organization
- Headquarters: Ottawa, Ontario, Canada
- Location: Canada
- President & CEO: David Guretzki
- Chair: Adam Driscoll
- Affiliations: World Evangelical Alliance
- Revenue: $4.6 million (2022)
- Expenses: $4.7 million (2022)
- Staff: 21 (2019)
- Website: evangelicalfellowship.ca

The Evangelical Fellowship of Canada (EFC; French: Alliance évangélique du Canada) is a national evangelical alliance, member of the World Evangelical Alliance. Its affiliates comprise 50 evangelical Christian denominations, 80 Christian organizations, 32 educational institutions, and 600 affiliated or independent local church congregations in Canada. It claims to represent nearly 2 million Christians. The head office is in Ottawa, Ontario. Its president is David Guretzki.

== History ==
The EFC was founded in 1964 in the Greater Toronto Area in Ontario. J. Harry Faught, a Pentecostal, was its founding president (i.e., chair of the board). It has been involved in numerous government bills, regarding issues such as religious freedoms, defining marriage, prostitution, medical assistance in dying, and abortion.

Brian Stiller became the first full-time staff member and Executive Director of the EFC in 1983. He carried that role until 1997 when Gary Walsh became President.

In June 2003, Bruce J. Clemenger became President of the EFC.

In February 2023, David Guretzki became President & CEO of the EFC.

== Statistics ==
As of 2023, the EFC has 46 Christian denominations evangelical members, 2 observer denominations, 66 organizations, 33 educational institutions and 600 member local churches in Canada. It claims to represent nearly 2 million Christians.

== Publications ==
The EFC publishes Faith Today, a major evangelical magazine in Canada, founded in 1983 under the leadership of Brian Stiller. Its young adult magazine Love Is Moving returned to its roots in 2024 as an online venture, ending a print run from 2016 to 2023. The young adult magazine was founded with the name Love in Action by Joel Gordon and Benjamin Porter.

== Affiliate denominations ==
- Anglican Catholic Church of Canada
- Anglican Diocese of Canada
- Apostolic Church of Pentecost of Canada
- Associated Gospel Churches of Canada
- Baptist General Conference of Canada
- Be In Christ Church of Canada
- Canadian Assemblies of God
- Canadian Baptist Ministries
  - Canadian Baptists of Atlantic Canada
  - Canadian Baptists of Ontario and Quebec
  - Canadian Baptists of Western Canada
  - Union of French Baptist Churches of Canada
- Canadian Church of God Ministries
- Canadian Conference of Mennonite Brethren Churches
- Canadian National Baptist Convention
- Christian and Missionary Alliance in Canada (AWF)
- Christian Reformed Church in North America
- Church of God in Western Canada
- Church of the Nazarene Canada
- Congregational Christian Churches in Canada
- Evangelical Covenant of Canada
- Evangelical Free Church of Canada
- Evangelical Mennonite Conference
- Evangelical Mennonite Mission Conference
- Evangelical Missionary Church of Canada
- Église réformée du Québec
- Fellowship of Christian Assemblies of Canada
- Foursquare Gospel Church of Canada
- Free Methodist Church in Canada
- Grace Communion International Canada
- Grace Fellowship Canada
- Independent Assemblies of God International Canada
- Lutheran Church–Canada
- Mennonite Church Canada
- Pentecostal Assemblies of Canada
- Pentecostal Assemblies of Newfoundland and Labrador
- Pentecostal Holiness Church of Canada
- Reformed Church in America (Regional Synod of Canada)
- The Canada Eastern Presbytery of The Korean Presbyterian Church Abroad
- The Fellowship of Evangelical Baptist Churches in Canada
- The Salvation Army
- United Brethren Church in Canada
- Vineyard Canada
- Vision Ministries Canada
- Wesleyan Church of Canada

In addition, the Anglican Church of Canada and the Presbyterian Church in Canada are observer members.
