= Heritage College & Seminary =

Canadian evangelical institution in Ontario

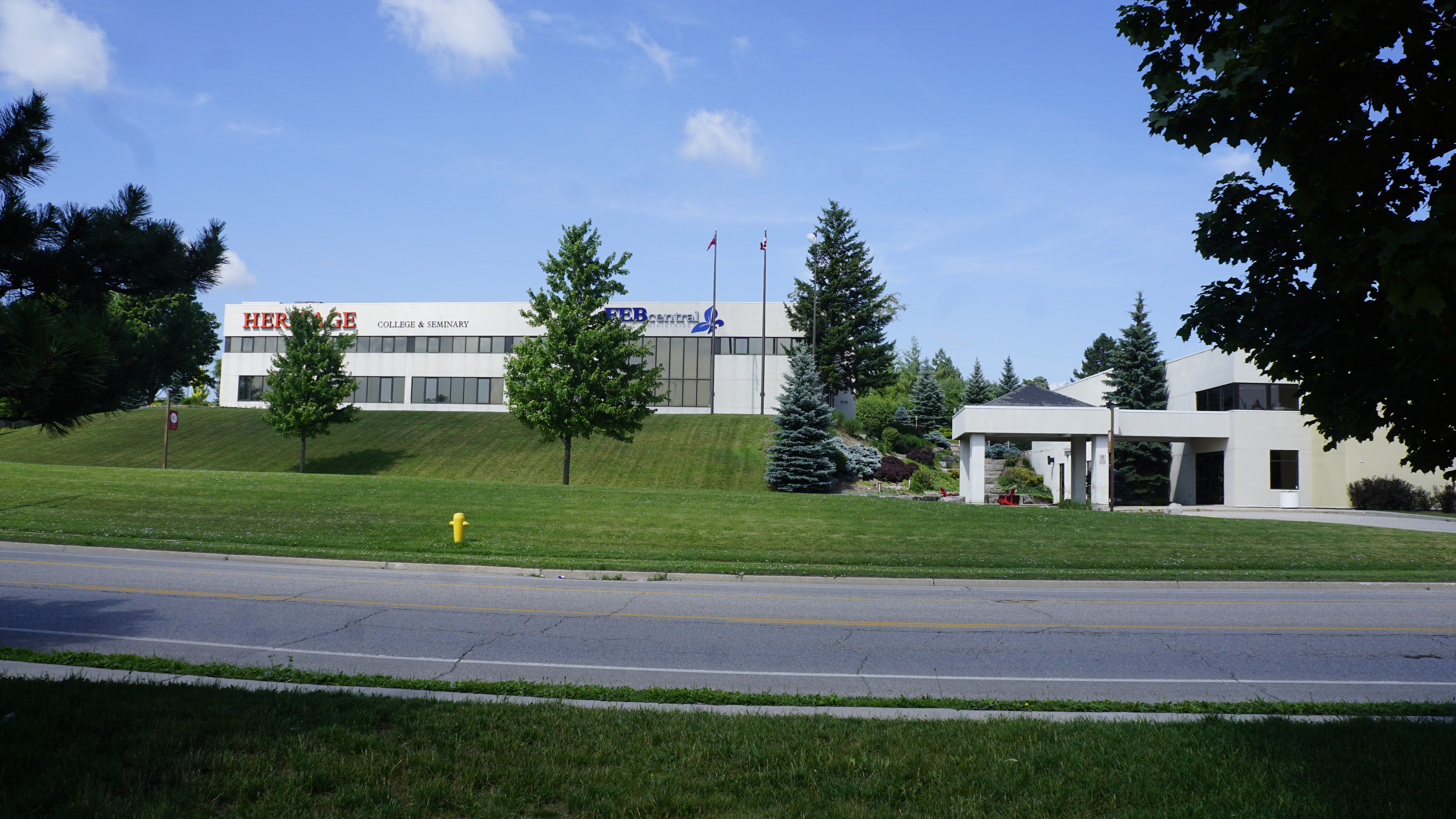
- Campus as seen from Holiday Inn Drive
- Former names: Central Baptist Seminary (1948); London Baptist Seminary (1976)
- Motto: Equipping men and women for life and ministry
- Type: Theological higher education
- Established: 1993
- Affiliations: Fellowship of Evangelical Baptist Churches in Canada; Associated Gospel Churches
- President: Jonathan Griffiths
- Academic staff: 16
- Location: Cambridge, Ontario, Canada; 43°25′2.028″N 80°19′22.08″W
- Campus: Urban
- Colours: Red, Gold, and White
- Website: discoverheritage.ca

The Heritage College & Seminary is a theological institute in Cambridge, Ontario, Canada. It is affiliated with the Fellowship of Evangelical Baptist Churches in Canada.

== History ==
Central Baptist Seminary was itself formed out of a split in fundamentalist Baptist ranks when, in 1948, firebrand Baptist leader Thomas Todhunter Shields, then head of the Union of Regular Baptist Churches of Ontario and Quebec, dismissed Dean W. Gordon Brown from his seminary. Brown and 50 students then went on to begin a new seminary holding more moderate positions under the direction of President Jack Scott. The first number of years the seminary was housed at Forward Baptist Church in Toronto, Ontario. In 1950, the seminary acquired a new building at 225 St. George Street, Toronto. In its formative years, CBS provided undergraduate and graduate theological education until the mid-1980s. In later years the seminary was moved to Gormley, Ontario (north of Toronto).

London Baptist Seminary began in 1976 in London, Ontario. The school provided undergraduate and graduate theological education. In 1981, the school's name changed to London Baptist Bible College and London Baptist Seminary (LBBC & LBS). In 1991, the Ontario legislature officially recognized the seminary as a degree-granting institution through the passage of "An Act to Incorporate the Heritage Baptist College and Heritage Theological Seminary, 1991, 1991".

Heritage was founded in 1993 through the merger of the former London Baptist Bible College and Seminary of London, Ontario and Central Baptist Seminary of Toronto, Ontario.

== Administration ==
Heritage College and Seminary is governed by a Board of Governors composed of distinguished Christian leaders from across Ontario. Heritage has adopted a Carver Policy Governance model for the Board of Governors and the institution. Heritage College and Seminary is affiliated with the Fellowship of Evangelical Baptist Churches in Canada (Central Region), to whose churches the school serves with other like-minded evangelical churches, organizations, and denominations.

== Accreditation ==
As an institution granting both undergraduate and graduate degrees, all of Heritage's degrees are accredited by The Association for Biblical Higher Education. The graduate school is also accredited by the Association of Theological Schools in the United States and Canada.

== Academics, philosophy and faculty ==
For the college and seminary, the educational mission is "to glorify God by partnering with churches and parachurch organizations in providing a biblically based education equipping people for life and ministry in the church and in the world. More specifically, the College has its mission statement as: "to provide an evangelical, faith-based, university-level education to equip students for life and serve in the church, community and the world." The Seminary's mission statement is: "to equip people for biblically and theologically grounded leadership and ministry to serve the mission of Christ and his church through their involvement in evangelical churches, denominations, mission agencies, and parachurch ministries.

With eight core faculty and twenty-four adjunct faculty, the college offers undergraduate-level certificates and degrees in a range of disciplines. All Heritage bachelor's degree programs are Bible and Theology majors consisting of 30+ credit hours in Bible/Theology and Biblical Studies. In addition, the Bachelor of Church Music and the Bachelor of Religious Education––Honours degree programs are double majors consisting of the specific degree major in addition to the Bible/Theology major. Current undergraduate programs include Biblical Care & Counselling Ministries, Children & Youth Ministries, Intercultural Studies, Music & Worship Studies, and Pastoral Studies.

Heritage Seminary currently has seven core faculty and nine adjunct faculty. The Seminary offers graduate-level programs in biblical and pastoral studies. Degrees include: Master of Divinity (MDiv), Master of Divinity (Research track), Master of Theological Studies (MTS), and Master of Theology (ThM).

== Notable associates ==
=== Alumni ===
- D. A. Carson, evangelical scholar and author.
- Elizabeth Wettlaufer, former nurse and convicted serial killer

=== Faculty ===
- Michael A.G. Haykin, church historian and professor.
- W. Gordon Brown, New Testament scholar and founding dean of Central Baptist Seminary
- Stanley K. Fowler, Professor Emeritus of Theological Studies
- David G. Barker, Professor Emeritus of Biblical Studies

=== Presidents: Central Baptist Seminary ===
- 1948–1957 Jack Scott
- 1958–1960 John F. Holliday
- 1961–1963 E. Sidney Kerr
- 1964–1969 W. Gordon Brown (interim)
- 1969–1974 Don A. Loveday
- 1974–1978 Jack Scott
- 1978–1979 Paul Holliday
- 1980–1982 Jim G. Wetherall (acting)
- 1982–1989 George Bell
- 1989 Jack Hannah
- 1989–1991 Vacant (Management Team)
- 1991–1993 Stanley K. Fowler (acting)

=== Chancellors: Central Baptist Seminary, Toronto ===
- Hal MacBain
- Jack Scott

=== Deans: Central Baptist Seminary, Toronto ===
- George (Ted) Barton
- W. Gordon Brown
- Stanley Fowler
- Paul Holliday
- Denzil Raymer
- John Wilson

=== Presidents: London Baptist Seminary ===
- 1976–1988 Gerry Benn
- 1988–1990 David G. Barker (acting)
- 1990–1993 Marvin Brubacher

=== Presidents: Heritage College and Seminary ===
- 1993–2011 Marvin Brubacher
- 2013–2023 Rick Reed
- 2023–2025 Bob Kallonen
- 2026– Jonathan Griffiths

=== Chancellors: Heritage College and Seminary ===
- 2023-2024 Dr. Rick Reed
- 2024–2025 Dr. Jonathan Griffiths
