= Henriette Odin Feller =

Swiss evangelical missionary

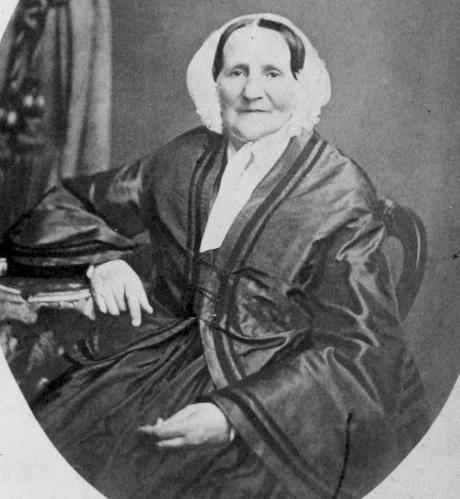
- Born: 22 April 1800
- Died: 29 March 1868 (aged 67)

Henriette Odin Feller (April 22, 1800 – March 29, 1868) was a Swiss-born Baptist missionary to Lower Canada. She established the first Francophone Baptist community in Quebec.

== Biography ==
The daughter of Alexandre Nicolas Odin, municipal secretary, and Jeanne Marie Gachet, she was born Henriette Odin in Montagny in the canton of Vaud and moved to Lausanne with her parents three years later.

In 1822, Odin married Louis Feller, the director of the Lausanne police. Over the next five years, her daughter, husband, sister and mother died. She contracted typhoid fever and took a rest cure at the Jura.

=== Ministry ===
In 1827, she left the Evangelical Reformed Church of the Canton of Vaud and she became involved with the Société des Missions Évangéliques de Lausanne. In 1835, she left for Canada with Louis Roussy. Opposed by the Catholic clergy in Quebec, she settled in Grande-Ligne, where the clergy had less influence. During the Lower Canada Rebellion, the patriotes viewed the missionaries as sympathetic to their English opponents and Feller and her converts fled to the United States. Following the Rebellion, Feller found that she was better received in Grande-Ligne; her group also gained some sympathy in the United States which helped them raise funds in support of the mission.

In 1836, she founded with Louis Roussy the Institut Feller for the training of pastors.

In 1839, she chose to affiliate with the Foreign Evangelical Society of New York in the United States. In 1847, she was baptized by immersion with her husband and became a member of the Canadian Baptist Missionary Society.

Feller came down with pneumonia in 1855 which led her to rest in the southern United States and later Switzerland without much improvement. In 1865, she became paralyzed and was confined to her room.

She died in Grande-Ligne, Quebec at the age of 67.
