= The Fellowship of Evangelical Baptist Churches in Canada =

Fellowship of Evangelical Baptist Churches in Canada
- Classification: Evangelicalism
- Theology: Baptist
- Associations: Evangelical Fellowship of Canada
- Headquarters: Guelph, Ontario, Canada
- Origin: 1953
- Congregations: 503
- Members: 71,073
- Official website: fellowship.ca

The Fellowship of Evangelical Baptist Churches in Canada is a Baptist Christian denomination in Canada. It is affiliated with the Evangelical Fellowship of Canada. The national headquarters are located in Guelph, Ontario, Canada. In 2011 Rev. Steven Jones was appointed as president.

== History ==
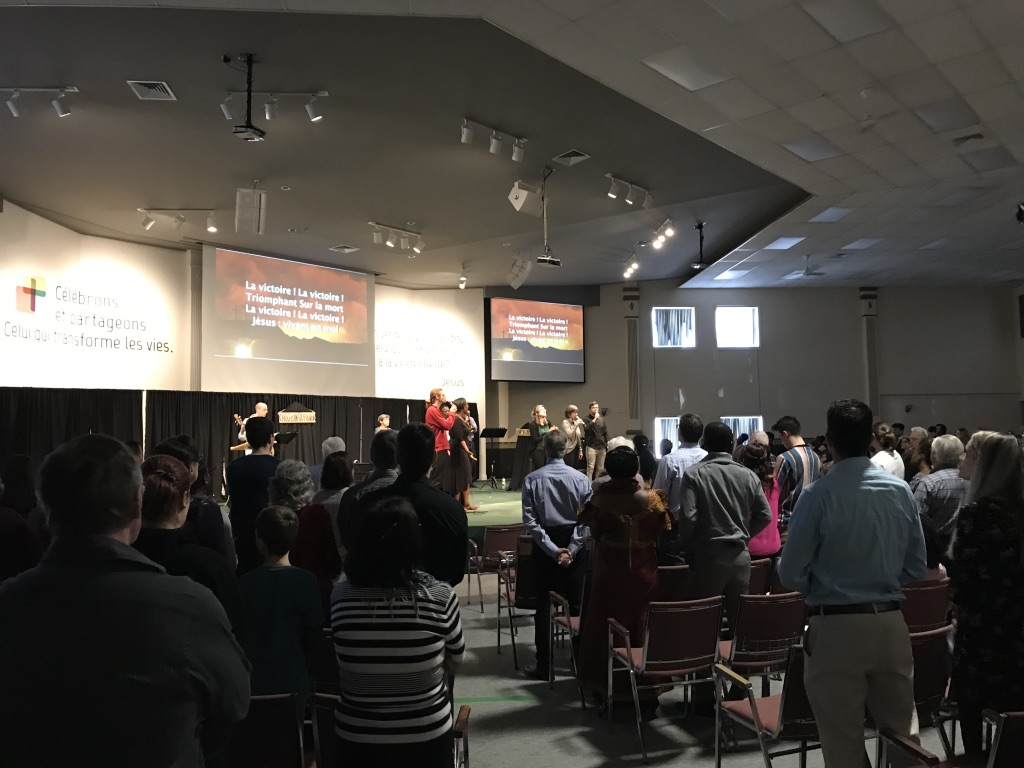
Worship service at Chauveau Evangelical Church in Quebec City.

In 1928, the Union of Regular Baptist Churches of Ontario and Quebec (led by Thomas Todhunter Shields) broke away from the Baptist Convention of Ontario and Quebec, while the Fellowship of Independent Baptist Churches was formed in 1933. These two merged in 1953 to form the FEBCC. The Regular Baptist Missionary Fellowship of Alberta joined in 1963, while the Convention of Regular Baptist Churches of British Columbia (founded 1927) joined in 1965.

In 1995, the Fellowship included over 503 churches with a total membership of over 66,612.

In 2001, the Fellowship had 71,073 members.

== Beliefs ==
The association has a Baptist confession of faith.

== Regions ==
It is composed of 5 regional fellowships; Fellowship Pacific, Fellowship Prairies, FEB Central, AÉBÉQ and Fellowship Atlantic.

== Mission work ==
The Fellowship of Evangelical Baptist Churches is engaged in missions to Africa, Central Asia, Europe, Japan, Latin America, the Middle East, Pakistan and South America, and offers ministry resources to assist these churches.

== Schools ==
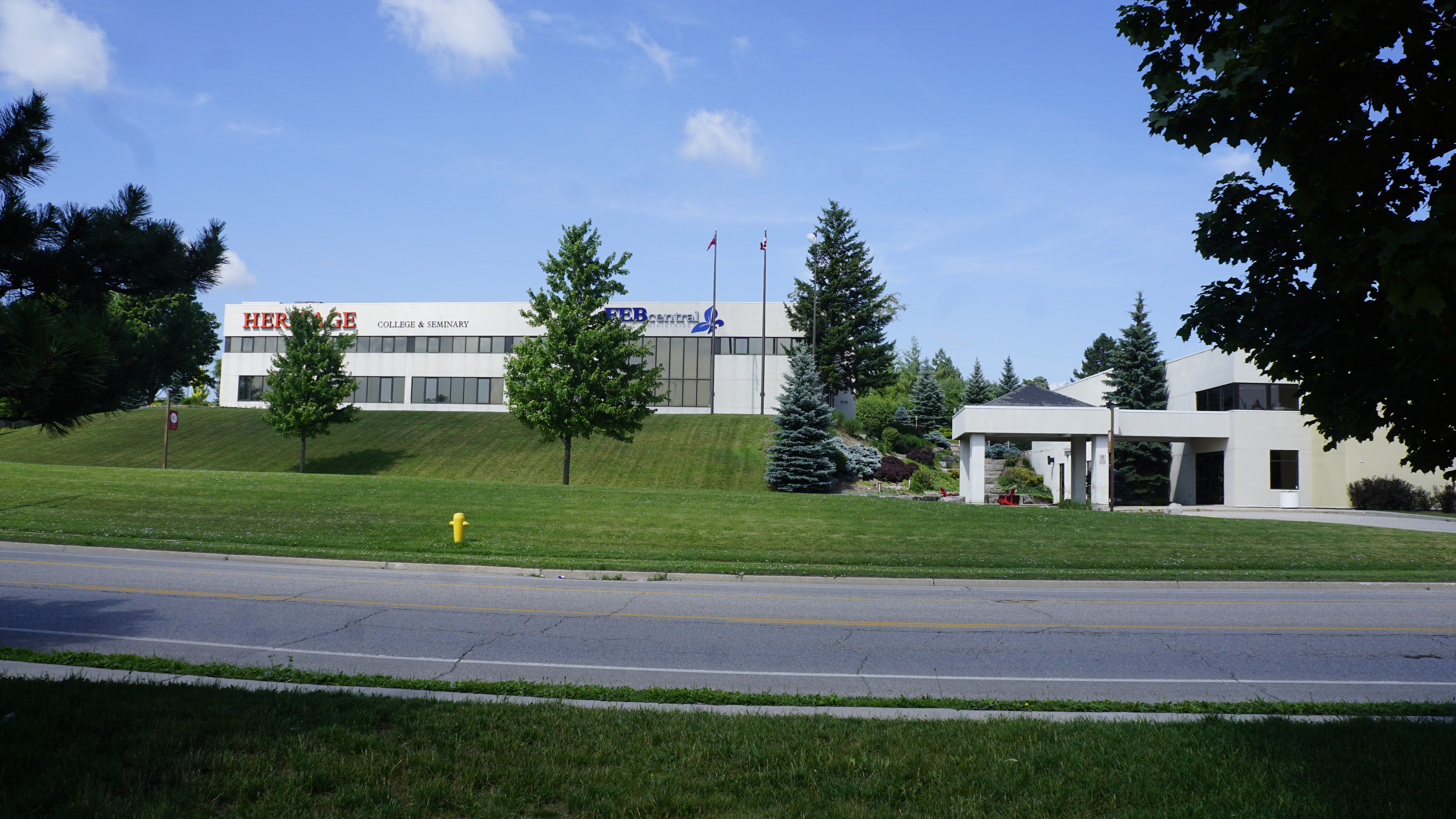
Heritage College & Seminary in Cambridge, Ontario.

The FEBCC, has strong affiliations with key institutions. Heritage College & Seminary in Cambridge, Ontario, is the main training ground for church leaders across Canada. Northwest Baptist Seminary in Langley, BC, is a partner in Western Canada, SEMBEQ in Quebec.

== Publication ==
The official magazine of the FEBCC, Thrive, is published three times per year.

== Convention centre ==
The Muskoka Bible Centre is affiliated with the FEBCC.

== See also ==
- Baptist
- Baptists in Canada
