= Carey Theological College =

Theological institute in British Columbia, Canada

- Type: Seminary
- Established: 1960
- Affiliations: Canadian Baptists of Western Canada
- Academic affiliations: University of British Columbia
- Location: Vancouver, British Columbia, Canada; 49.27156°N 123.2490°W
- Website: www.carey-edu.ca

Carey Theological College is Baptist theological institute based in Vancouver, British Columbia. It is affiliated with the Canadian Baptists of Western Canada.

== History ==
The Carey Theological College was founded in 1959 as Carey Hall by the Canadian Baptists of Western Canada. It officially opened in 1960. In 1991, it was renamed Carey Theological College.

== Programs ==
Carey places an emphasis on applied theology, particularly preaching, missions, urban studies, evangelism, spiritual formation and equipping ministries.
