= Canadian Baptists of Western Canada =

Baptist Christian association of churches in Canada

- Classification: Evangelicalism
- Theology: Baptist
- Associations: Canadian Baptist Ministries; Evangelical Fellowship of Canada; Canadian Council of Churches
- Region: Western Canada
- Headquarters: Calgary, Alberta, Canada
- Origin: 1860; Manitoba
- Congregations: 138
- Official website: cbwc.ca

The Canadian Baptists of Western Canada (CBWC), formerly the Baptist Union of Western Canada, is a moderate Baptist Christian association of churches in British Columbia, Alberta, Saskatchewan, Manitoba, Yukon and the Northwest Territories. Headquarters is in Calgary, Alberta. The union is one of four components of Canadian Baptist Ministries.

== History ==
Baptists in western Canada began in Manitoba in the 1860s, organizing formally in 1884 with the establishment of the Baptist Convention of Manitoba and the Northwest. In 1897, British Columbian Baptists organized their own Convention. These Conventions, and others, united to form the Baptist Convention of Western Canada in 1907, representing 201 churches and 11,000 congregants. The name was changed to the Baptist Union of Western Canada (BUWC) in 1909, by which it was known until 2007. In 1944, the BUWC joined with the United Baptist Convention of the Maritimes and the Baptist Convention of Ontario and Quebec to form the Baptist Federation of Canada (BFC) as a national coordinating body. It was joined by l'Union d'Eglises Baptistes Francaises au Canada in 1970. These four bodies remained federated until 1995 when the federation, by now renamed Canadian Baptist Federation (CBF), merged with Canadian Baptist Ministries, which now functions as the shared outreach arm of all four associations.

They have ordained female pastors since 1959.

In 2007, the BUWC changed its name to the Canadian Baptists of Western Canada to better reflect its national identity and western focus.

Key figures in CBWC history include: Tommy Douglas, a Baptist minister in Weyburn Saskatchewan and healthcare reforming politician, Alexander Cameron Rutherford, Alberta's first Premier and founder of the University of Alberta, William Aberhart (Bible Bill), an Albertan radio personality and Albertan Premier. Prime Minister John Diefenbaker was also a Canadian Baptist.

== Statistics ==
As of 2026, the CBWC has 138 churches, according to its church directory.

== Beliefs ==
The association has a Baptist confession of faith. The Union is a member of Canadian Baptist Ministries and Evangelical Fellowship of Canada.

The group's theological positions are evangelical.

== Organization ==
The Canadian Baptists of Western Canada is organized into three regions: British Columbia and the Yukon, the Mountain Standard Region (Alberta, the NWT, and MST portions of BC), and the Heartland Region (Saskatchewan and Manitoba). The work of the denomination is overseen by the executive minister, three regional ministers, and various ministry and administrative staff. A board of directors is elected from member churches at a bi-annual assembly and is responsible for the overall governance of the CBWC. The CBWC's head offices are in Calgary, Alberta.

== Associated ministries ==
Carey Theological College in Vancouver provides much of the denomination's graduate level theological training for pastors and lay leaders. The William Carey Institute in Vancouver provides undergraduate training.

The CBWC owns or is affiliated with six children's camps across Western Canada: Keats Camps in BC, Gull Lake Centre, Mill Creek Baptist Camp and Camp Wapiti in Alberta, and The Quest at Christopher Lake and Katepwa Lake Camp in Saskatchewan.

Food banks and ministries to vulnerable or impoverished people operate under the auspices of Canadian Baptist churches known as the Mustard Seed in Calgary, Edmonton and Victoria. Many other CBWC churches run community outreach ministries in their communities.
