= Association of Regular Baptist Churches =

The Association of Regular Baptist Churches was an Independent Baptist Christian denomination in Canada.

== History ==
One of its leading churches was Jarvis Street Baptist Church of Toronto, Ontario, whose well-known pastor of 45 years, Thomas Todhunter Shields (1873–1955), led fundamentalist forces in the Baptist Convention of Ontario and Quebec during the fundamentalist/modernist controversies in the first half of the 20th century.

Forerunners of the ARBC include the Union of Regular Baptist Churches, which was formed in 1928 in Hamilton, Ontario by 77 churches withdrawing from Ontario/Quebec Convention over the election of a liberal professor at McMaster University.

ARBC was a partner of the Toronto Baptist Seminary and Bible College, and The Gospel Witness.

In 2003, the ARBC had 10 churches (mostly in Ontario) with approximately 1500 members. In addition to these ten churches that were considered "recognized" members of the association, about 10 more were considered "supporting" churches.

The GARBC followed a "fellowship" model rather than a denominational model. Each member church was free to act independently in all matters. The home office of the GARBC held no controlling power over member churches. The purpose of the association is for fellowship between churches of like faith and practice.

The few member churches of the association became members of Sovereign Grace Fellowship of Canada, and the association ceased to exist at the beginning of the 2000s.

== See also ==
- Baptist Distinctives
