= College Street Baptist Church =

Church in Toronto, Ontario, Canada

Coordinates: 43°39′22″N 79°24′38″W

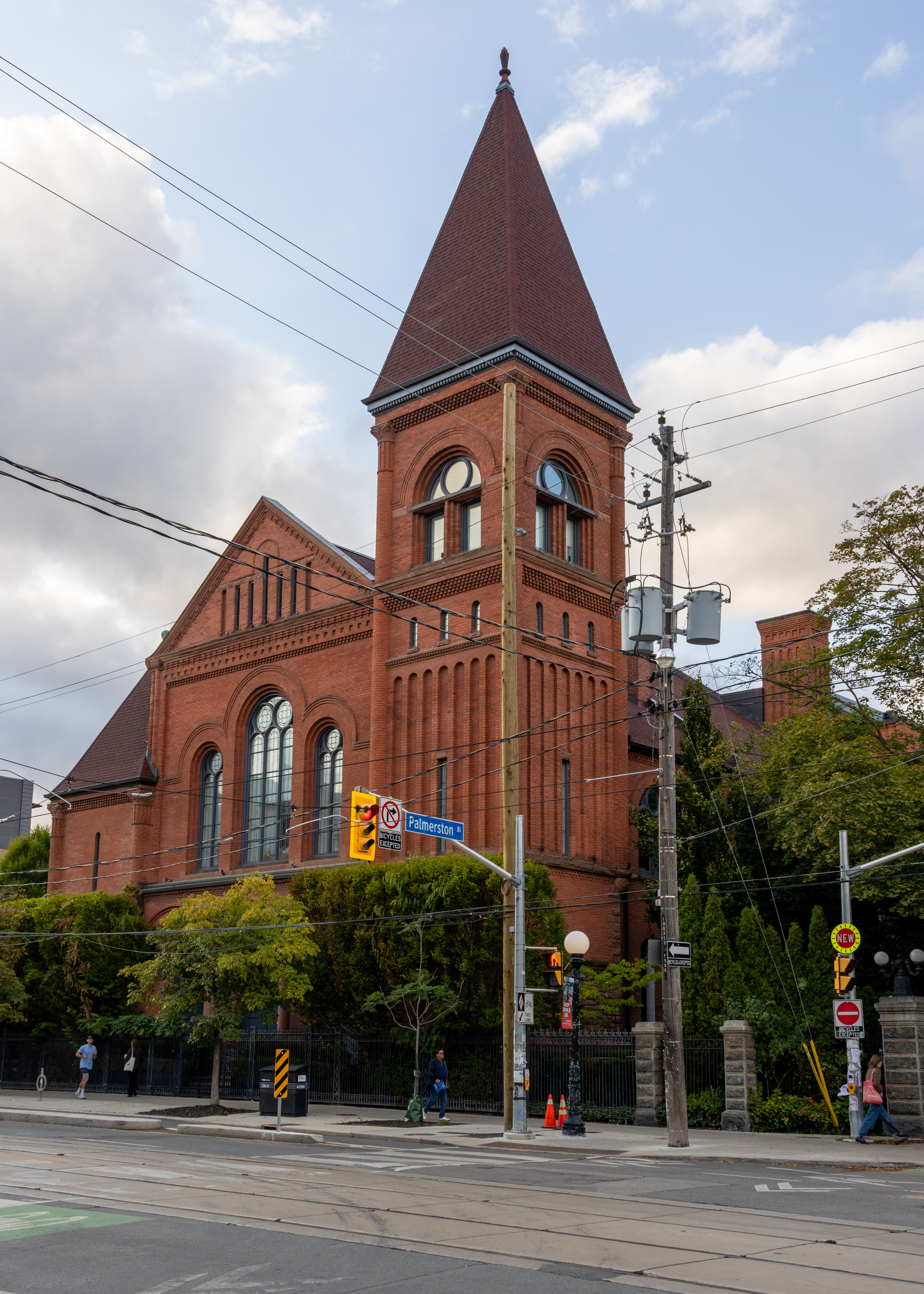
- College Street Baptist Church in 2025
- College Street Baptist Church
- Location: College and Palmerston Boulevard in Toronto, Ontario, Canada.
- Country: Canada
- Denomination: Baptist

College Street Baptist Church was a Baptist church at the northwest corner of College Street and Palmerston Boulevard in the Little Italy neighbourhood of Toronto, Ontario, Canada.

== History ==
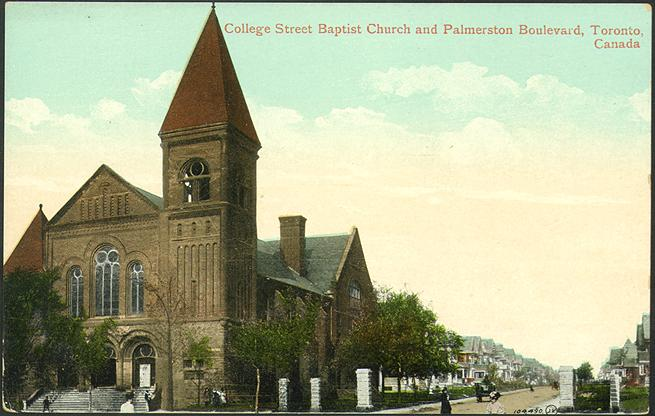
The Church at Palmerston and College Street, c. 1910

The Baptist denomination in Ontario, Canada formerly had an organization called a "Union," for the purpose of carrying forward mission work in eligible portions of the city, and from this work developing self-sustaining congregations. Out of this work sponsored mostly by congregations at Bond Street Baptist Church, Alexander Street Baptist Church, and Yorkville Baptist Church (see Yorkminster Park Baptist Church), College Street Baptist Church was organized as a church on 15 December 1872 with Hoyes Lloyd as the first pastor.

The congregation originally built a small building at the corner of College St. and Lippincott. This property was subsequently sold in 1888 and a new building was constructed at College St. and Palmerston Boulevard with its first service held in September 1889.

Early pastors include: S. A. Dykes and Robert Holmes. In February 1886 Stuart S. Bates became the pastor and under his able leadership the church began to once again grow and prosper.

Around the year 1960 the congregation had dwindled to a small number of mostly elderly members. At that time it was decided to close the church and the remaining members to attend neighbouring congregations. The church building was subsequently sold to the Portuguese Seventh-day Adventist Church (Toronto); see this latter article for the subsequent history of the building. In 2007, the building was sold to developer Matthew Kosoy who turned this College Street landmark into four large multi-level luxury freehold homes.
