= Thomas Shields =

Thomas Shields may refer to:

- Tom Shields (born 1991), American swimmer
- Thomas Todhunter Shields (1873–1955), leader of the fundamentalist religious movement in Canada
