= Portuguese Seventh-day Adventist Church (Toronto) =

Seventh-day Adventist church in Toronto, Ontario, Canada

Coordinates: 43.6624908°N 79.4696884°W

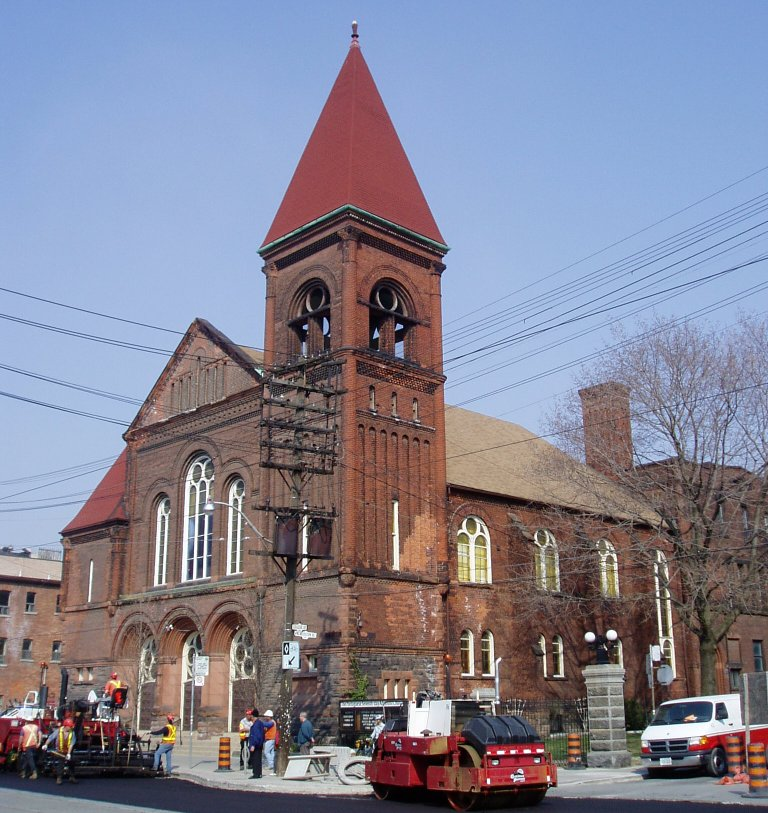
Portuguese Seventh-day Adventist Church in College Street

The Portuguese Seventh-day Adventist Church is a Seventh-day Adventist church serving the Portuguese community of Toronto, Ontario, Canada. The congregation is currently meeting every Saturday at the High Park Korean United Church building located at 260 High Park Ave.

== Former Location ==
The Portuguese Seventh-day Adventist congregation was located on College St. just west of Bathurst St from 1970 to 2007. The former location was originally built as College Street Baptist Church in 1889. In 1970 the church was sold to the Portuguese Seventh-day Adventist congregation, the area having become the centre of Toronto's Portuguese community. In 2007, the building was sold to developer Matthew Kosoy who turned this College Street landmark into four large multi-level luxury freehold homes. The church building was restored to its Romanesque Revival style. In January 2013, the congregation relocated to 280 Carlingview Dr, Toronto, Toronto, ON M9W 5G1.

== See also ==
- Seventh-day Adventist Church
