= Jarvis Street Baptist Church =

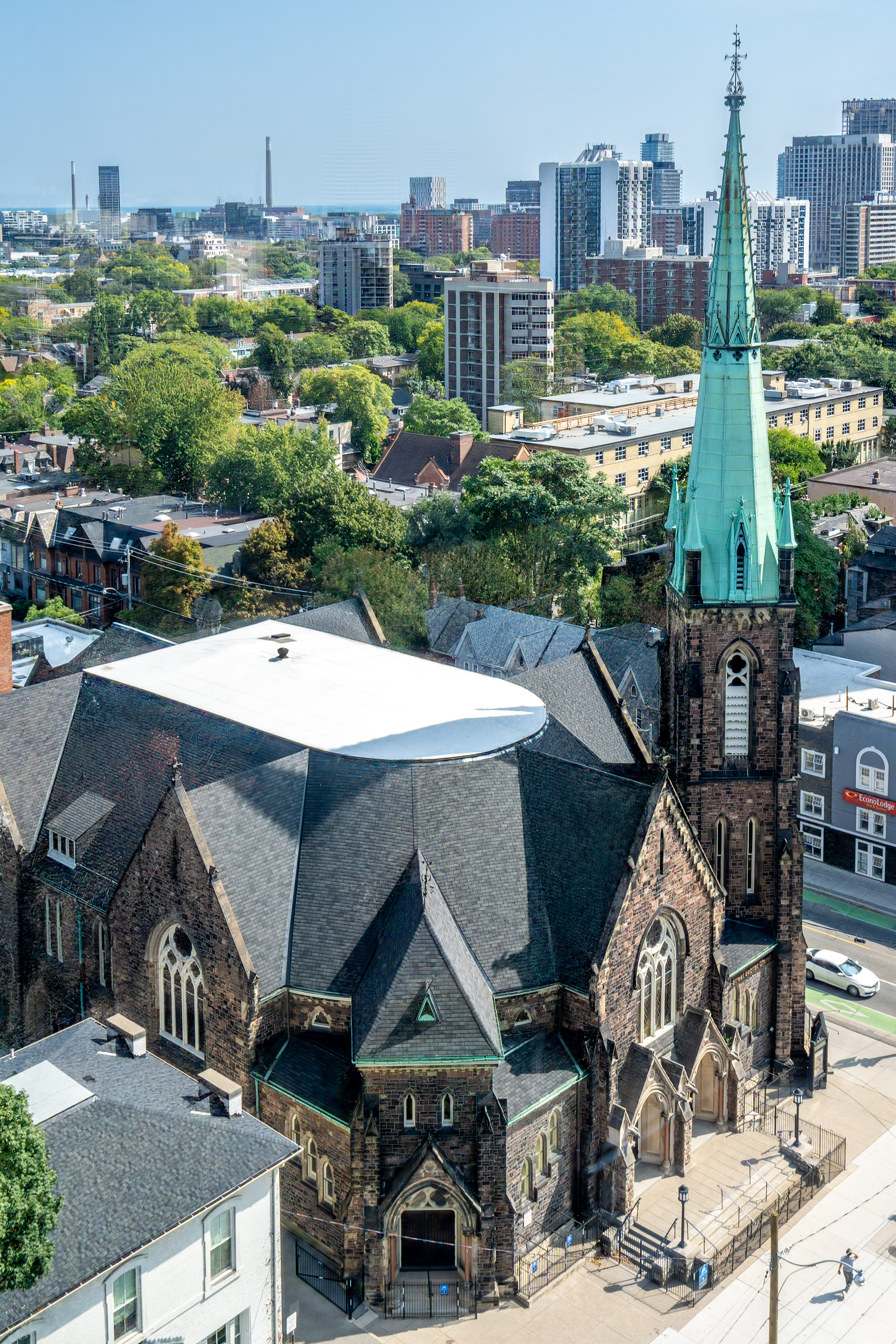
- The church in 2025

- Location within Toronto
- 43.6608°N 79.3755°W
- Location: 130 Gerrard St E, Toronto, Ontario
- Country: Canada
- Website: www.jsbc.org

Architecture
- Architect(s): Henry Langley, Edmund Burke, Edward Langley
- Style: Gothic Revival
- Groundbreaking: 1874
- Completed: 1875; 151 years ago

Ontario Heritage Act
- Designated: May 12, 1999

The Jarvis Street Baptist Church is a Baptist church located at the intersection of Gerrard Street and Jarvis Street in Toronto's Garden District. One of the oldest churches in the city, its congregation was founded in 1818, and the present church constructed in 1875. It is a member of the Sovereign Grace Fellowship of Canada.

== History ==
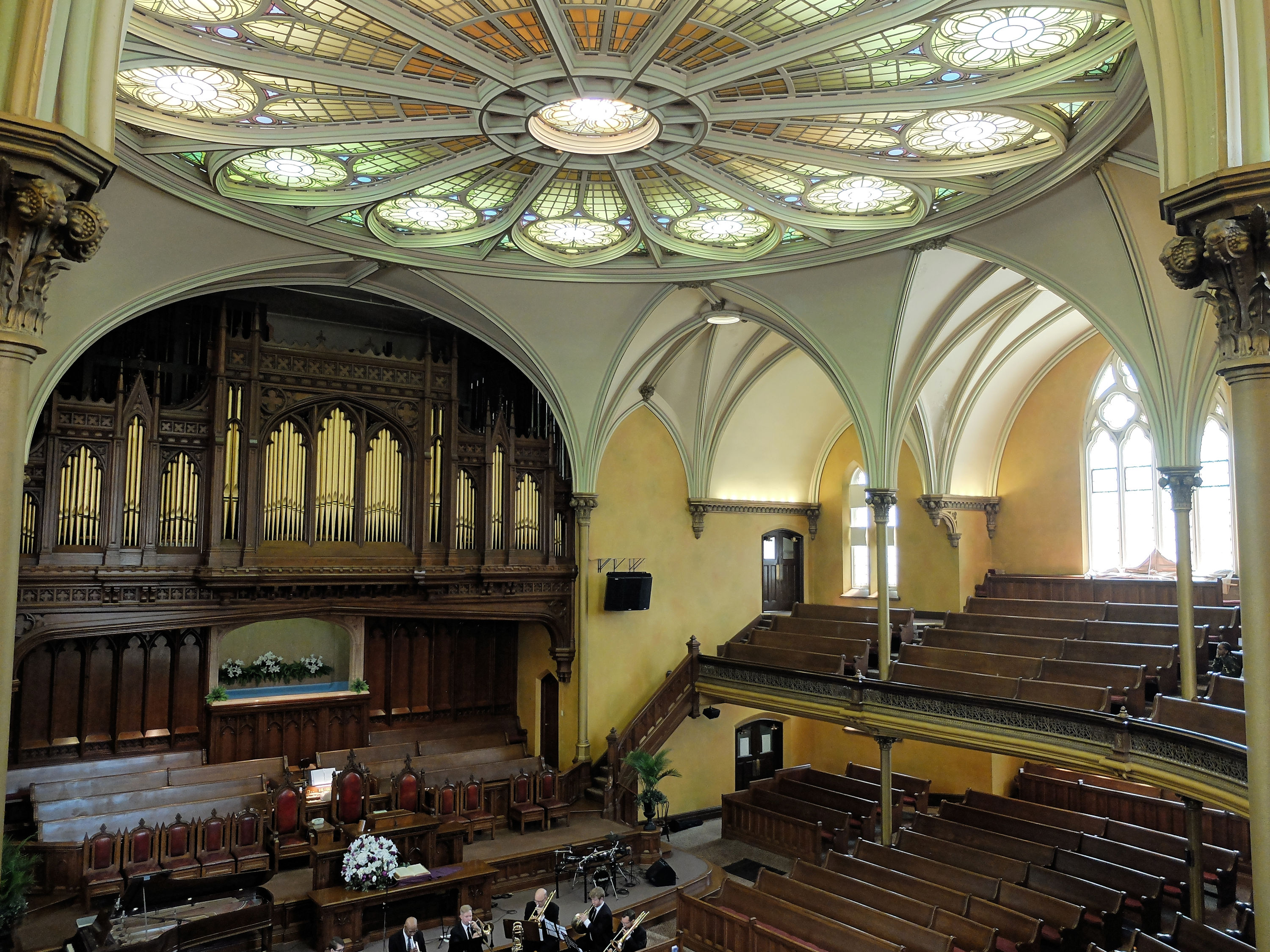
Inside the church

Early records indicate that by 1827, church meetings were held at the Masonic Hall on Colborne Street. The congregation then bought property on Lombard Street and constructed a small chapel in 1832. It was then known also as the Baptist Church of York. By 1848, the congregation had moved to Bond Street and became known simply as Bond Street Baptist Church with a membership that grew to 400 by the late 1860s. Beginning with Bond Street and continuing through at Jarvis Street an outreach was begun further west which was established in 1880 as Beverley Street Baptist Church. (See also Toronto Chinese Baptist Church.)

The present church was erected on Jarvis Street in 1875, with a large donation to the construction costs from the Canadian Senator and banker, William McMaster. The newly formed Baptist Union of Canada held its first meeting at Jarvis Street in October 1880. In 1882, William McMaster, William Elliot (a member of Jarvis Street and a Toronto pharmacist and businessman), and others established the Standard Publishing Company, which published the Canadian Baptist, transferring that enterprise from private ownership to a denominational enterprise.

In 1888 the Western Convention, while in session at the Jarvis Street Church passed the following resolution:

Whereas this question of Union has been carefully considered, both by the Society in the East and by us, therefore, resolved, that we do now receive the Eastern Society into union with us.

The new convention was to be called, 'the Baptist Convention of Ontario and Quebec.'"

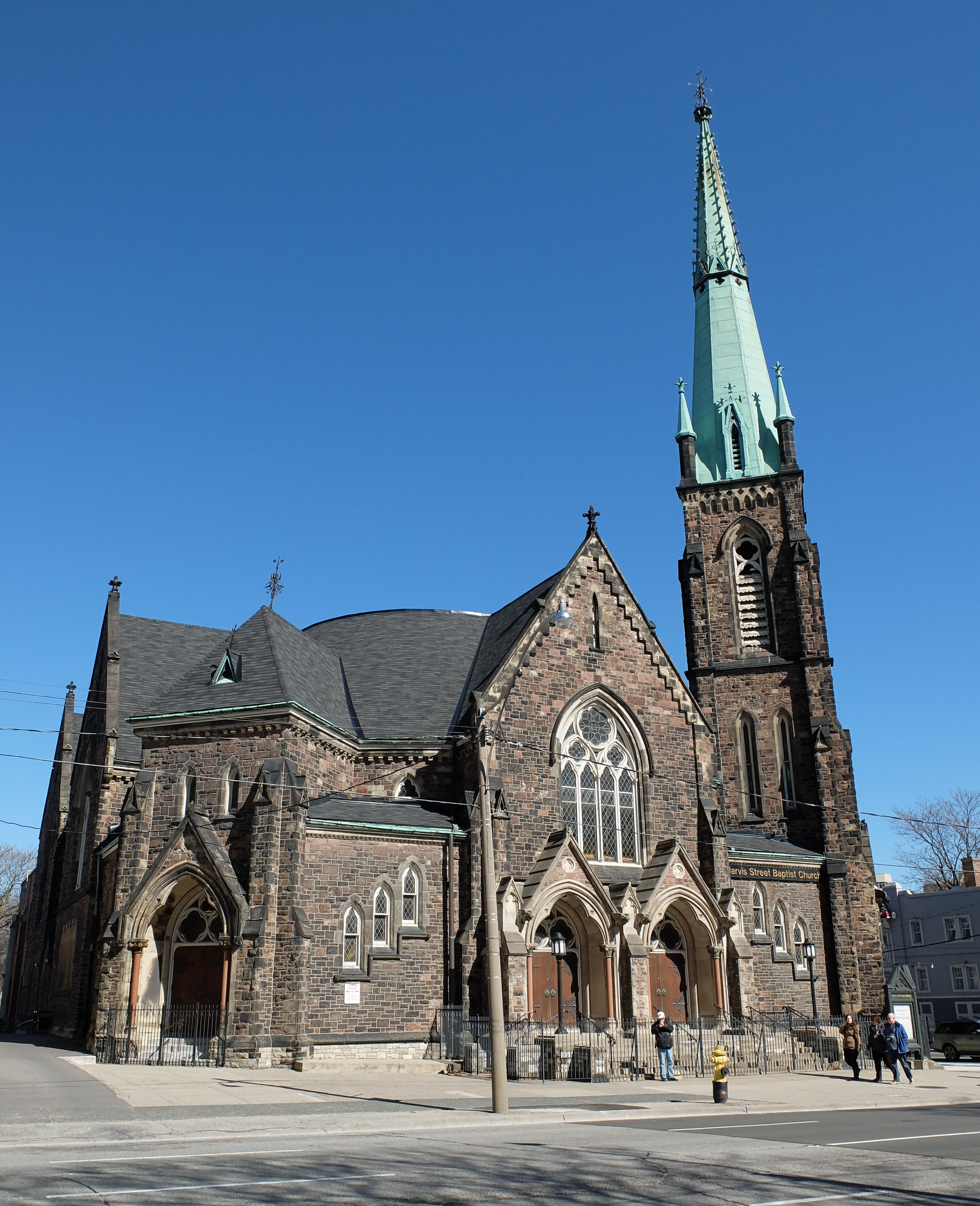
Jarvis Street Baptist Church in 2017

Less than 40 years later the same Convention passed a resolution calling for the dismissal of Jarvis Street and a number of other like-minded congregations during the "Fundamentalist–Modernist Controversy".

From 1925 until 1933, the church owned and operated a radio station in Toronto under the call letters CJBC. The station went off the air when the federal government terminated all religious radio licenses. The station is unrelated to the current CJBC which is the French-language station owned by the Canadian Broadcasting Corporation.

== Pastors ==
The congregation's past ministers include John Harvard Castle (1830–1890), who became pastor in 1873 (while at Bond St.) and later played an instrumental role in founding the Toronto Baptist College (later McMaster) serving as its first President and Professor of Systematic Theology and Christian Ethics. Benjamin Daniel Thomas (1843–1917) served from October 1881 to July 1903 and was once referred to as "the best-loved Baptist minister in Canada." Henry Francis Perry (1861–?) served from 1903 to 1909, leaving for a pastorate at First Baptist Church Vancouver, British Columbia. During his pastorate he also taught at McMaster. He was followed by Thomas Todhunter Shields who held the pastorate from 1910 until his death in 1955. It was during Shields' tenure that a disastrous fire severely damaged the building in 1938. Shields supervised the rebuilding and insisted that the new spire be an exact replica of the old one.

Notable pastors include:

- 1844–1848 Robert Alexander Fyfe
- 1855–1860 Robert Alexander Fyfe
- 1860–1869 Thomas Ford Caldicott
- 1910–1955 Thomas Todhunter Shields

== Notable members ==
- Alexander Mackenzie (politician)
- William McMaster
- William Kirkpatrick McNaught
- Samuel Platt

== Architecture ==
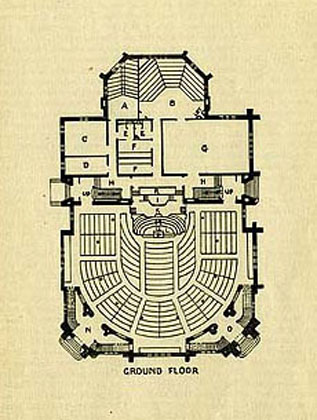
The floor plan in 1897

The Jarvis Street Baptist Church was designed in the Gothic Revival style by the architectural firm of Henry Langley and Edmund Burke who served for many years at Jarvis Street Baptist Church as a Sunday-school teacher, chair of the choir committee, and deacon. It was one of the first churches in Canada to be built with an amphitheatre-shaped interior. The ground floor seating is grouped in a semicircle, while the gallery above is horseshoe shaped. The gallery is supported by iron columns. Above the gallery, another set of columns support a faux-Gothic ceiling.

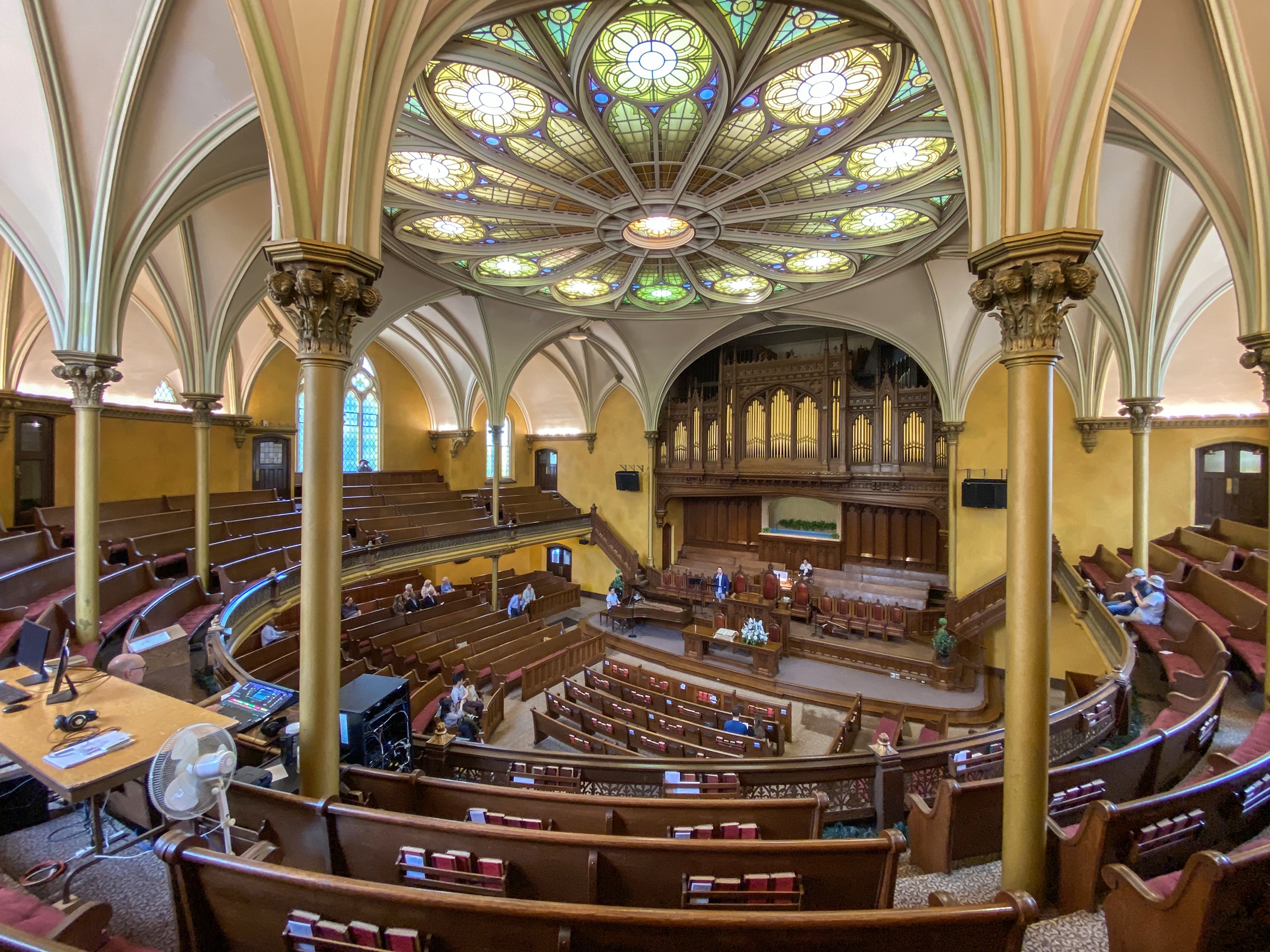
Interior of the church

The main façade of the building is made out brown stone that is obtained from the regions of Queenstown. The stone is laid unevenly with a pattern that varies in different shades of browns and dark yellows. The material used for the roof is Canadian slate. The roof is constructed from a series of pitched segments that are centrally connected by a horizontally sliced dome. There are eight entrances, each consisting of solid oak double doors framed with pointed sandstone arches. Several of these doors have been blocked off with black cast iron gates. Triangular sets of small rosette windows are placed above every door to fill the space in between the entrance and the top of the arch. The building has number of columns with slim tall shape and different capitals that are loosely based on a Corinthian order. The capitals are made of gray stone while the columns are of a high quality bronze shaded granite found in St. George, New Brunswick.

The church has been protected under Part IV of the Ontario Heritage Act since 1999. The designation notes that it was designed by Langley & Burke. The by-law notes that alterations made in 1938–1939 after a fire were designed by Horwood and White, architects. The text also notes: "[The] Jarvis Street Baptist Church was the first church in Canada designed with a U-shaped galleried auditorium, described by J. R. Robertson as 'the more modern method of seating which bends the audience around the chancel'".

== Context ==
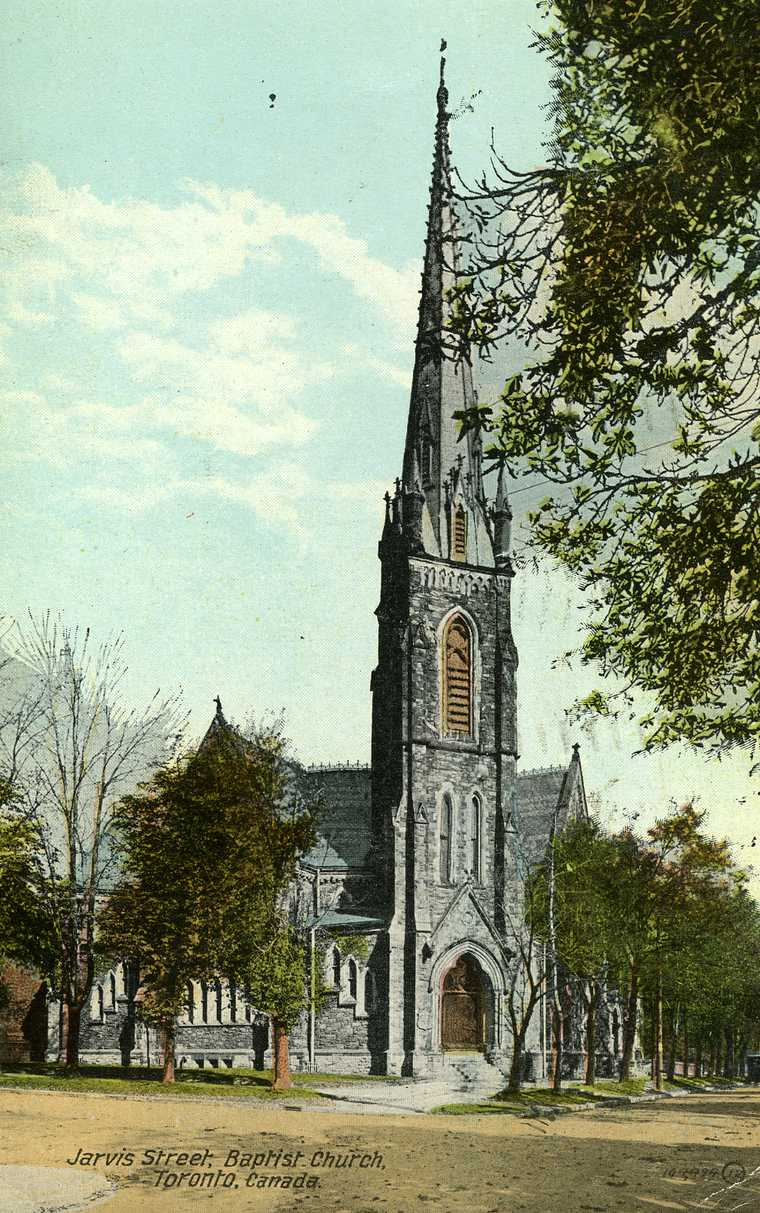
Postcard showing the church circa 1917.

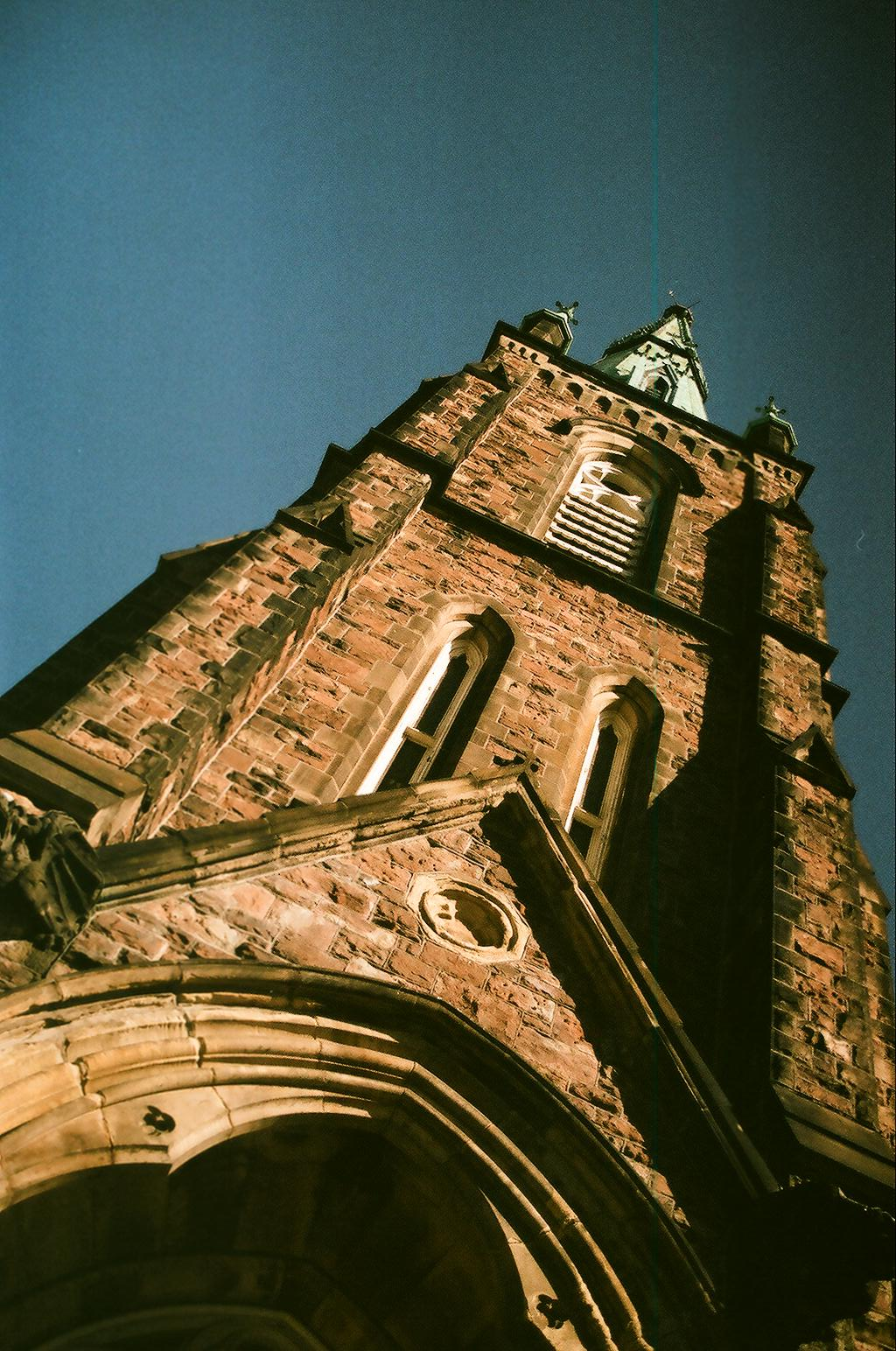
Tower and front entrance of Jarvis Street Baptist Church

The building is situated in the centre of a group of fast food restaurants, corner stores, apartment buildings, and townhouses. It is the neighbour of the Allan Gardens Park as well as Grace Toronto Church (originally Old St. Andrew's Presbyterian Church). The interior of St. Andrew's, also designed by Langley and Burke, is said to resemble that of the original Jarvis Street Baptist Church.

It is a member of the Sovereign Grace Fellowship of Canada. The Toronto Baptist Seminary and Bible College is adjacent to the church, and closely associated with it.
