= Palmerston Boulevard =

Street in Toronto, Ontario, Canada

Coordinates: 43.6560°N 79.4102°W

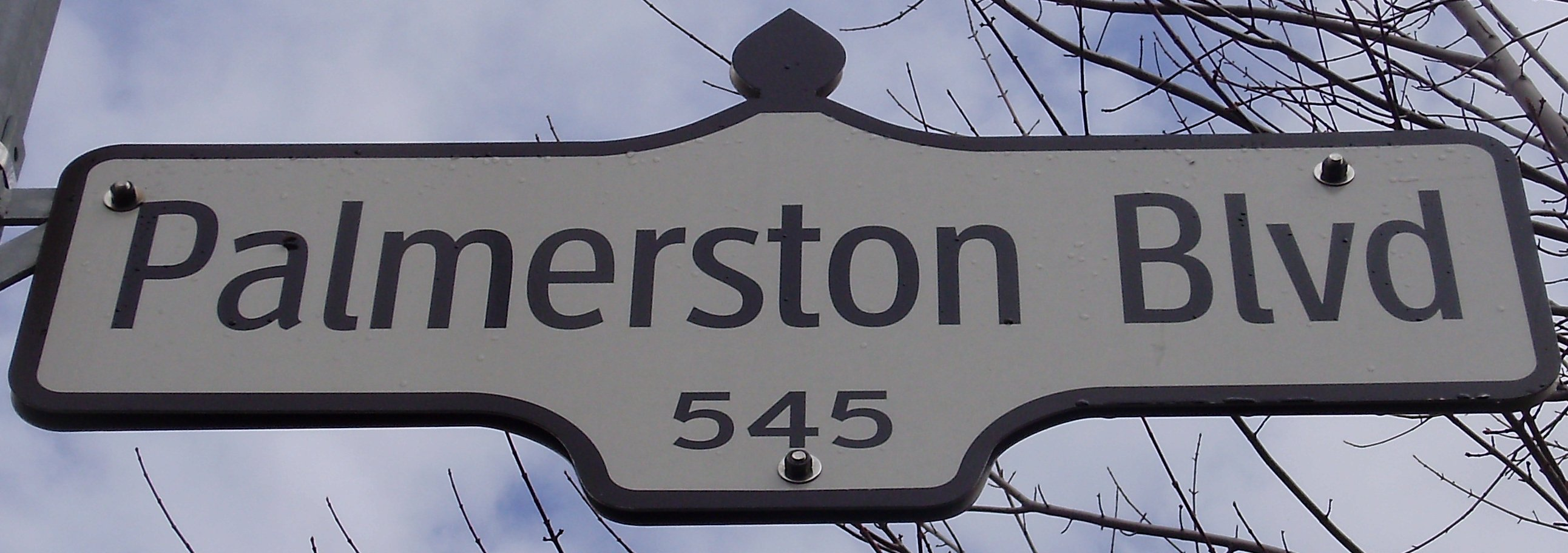
A Palmerston Boulevard street sign

Houses along Palmerston Boulevard

Palmerston Boulevard is a residential street located in the city of Toronto, Ontario, Canada, two blocks west of Bathurst Street, between Koreatown and Little Italy. The street is bounded by stone and iron gates both at Bloor Street and College Street. Notably, it is lit with symmetrically placed cast-iron lamps and canopied by mature silver maple trees. The name Palmerston continues north and south as Palmerston Avenue, from Bloor Street to the Canadian Pacific Railway tracks and from College Street to Queen Street.

Formerly named Muter Street, the street's name was changed to Palmerston at the turn of the 20th century, as it was developed. Muter Street was named after Lieutenant-Colonel Robert Muter of the Royal Canadian Rifle Regiment. Palmerston was named after Lord Palmerston, Prime Minister of the United Kingdom, perhaps to promote Victorian ideals to future Torontonians.

Most of the houses on Palmerston Boulevard were built between 1903 and 1910.

An architectural analysis of the Boulevard was published in 1982. Palmerston Boulevard: An Evaluation of a Unique Residential Street written by Brown and Storey Architects covers the evolution of the street, its landscape, built form, critical evaluation of renovations, and key landscape items such as trees, porches, street lights and the gates. It also contains a comparison of Toronto streets built around the same time with Palmerston compared to Indian Road, St. George Street and High Park Boulevard. Brown and Storey place great emphasis on Palmerston's trees and lamps - "The trees and street lamps define the space of the Boulevard as a passage."

The grandest house on the street is #469, the George Weston Mansion, built on 1.5 lots. Weston died in 469 Palmerston Boulevard on April 6, 1924. Former mayors of Toronto Horatio Hocken and Samuel McBride lived at #340 and #351 respectively.

Palmerston Boulevard was initially a wealthy Anglo-Saxon enclave. From the 1920s to the 1950s, the street was made up primarily of middle- and upper-middle-class Jews who were often excluded from elite WASP neighbourhoods. In the 1960s, some of the houses were subdivided into rooming houses that served university students.

== The Palmerston Lamps ==
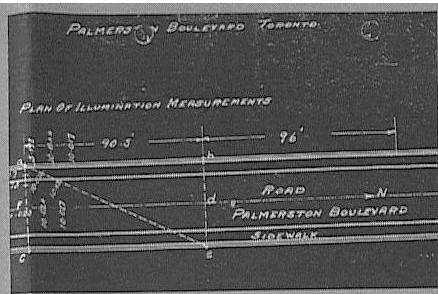
c. 1905 Hydro Study of the illumination of the Boulevard

On June 20, 1973, Toronto City Council added the Palmerston Gates and Lights to the City's Heritage Properties Inventory. Nevertheless, in November 2003, city officials proposed replacing the original lamps with aluminum replicas. Residents of the area opposed the move and in January 2004 City Council voted to keeping the original lights.

During Mayor David Miller's December 2, 2003 inaugural speech he spoke of the lamps when he said: "There is no reason, for instance, that we should not preserve the century-old, cast-iron street lamps on Palmerston Boulevard - those lamps are about the history of this city, they are about beauty in public spaces. The passion with which the residents of the Palmerston neighbourhood defend the original lamps is an example of the powerful, physical connection we feel to our neighbourhoods."

By December 2005, the city had refurbished and repainted most of the original lights. However, the Palmerston Area Residents Association noted that the refurbished lights have polycarbonate globes rather than the original glass globes; they also have metal-halide lights rather than the original 100 watt incandescent bulbs.

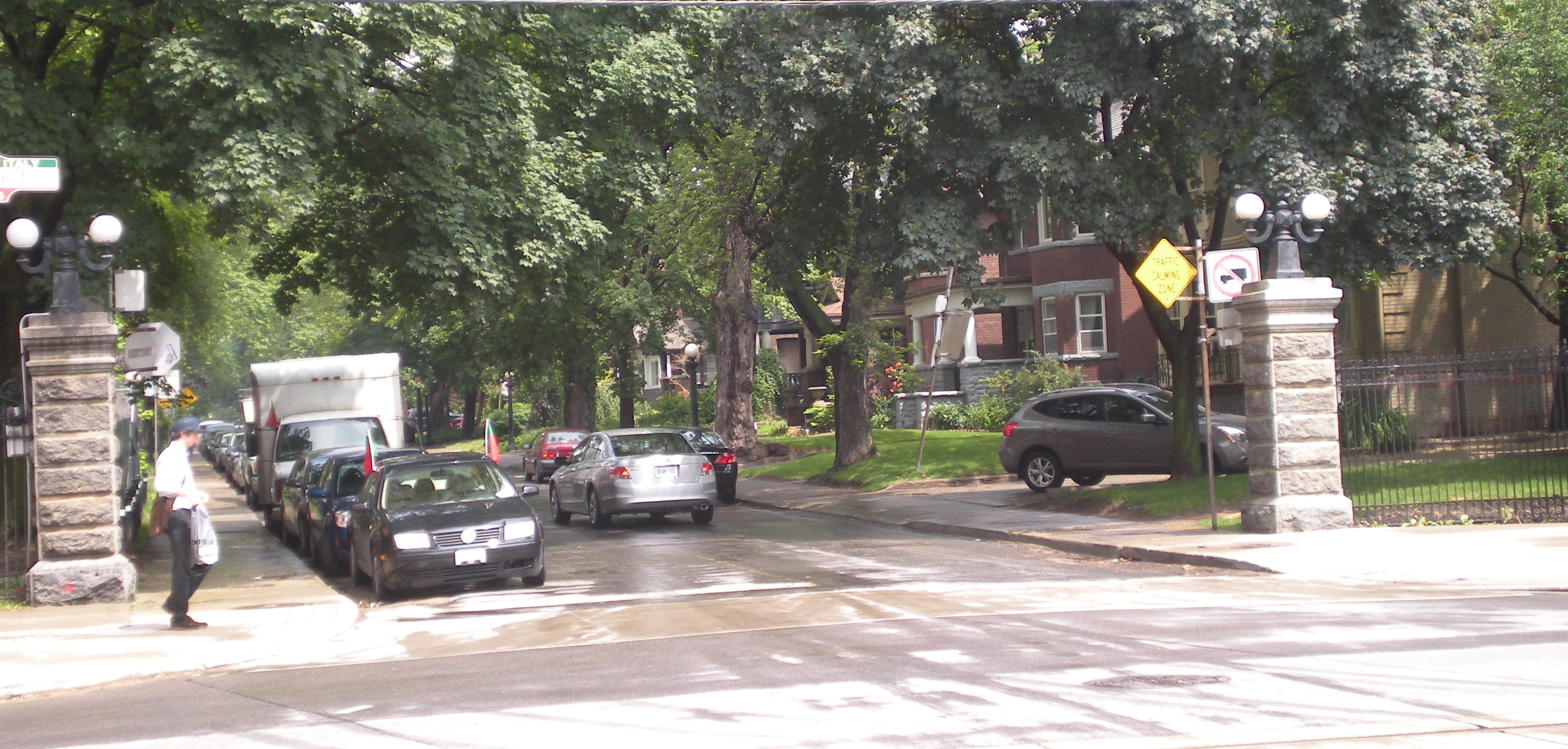
View North from College St, showing gates and lamps

The lamps, known as 'single pole-top lamps' or 'light pillars' were common in North America by the 1920s. Palmerston is one of the few streets in Toronto that has kept its original lamps. Identical lamps on Chestnut Park in Rosedale were replaced in 2002. This style of lighting was designed to light a path for pedestrians, as automobiles had not come into common use. The current luminance of the street is several times higher than the original and a light refractor around the bulbs reflects light downward, causing the top of the globes to appear darkened at night.

== The College/Palmerston Church ==
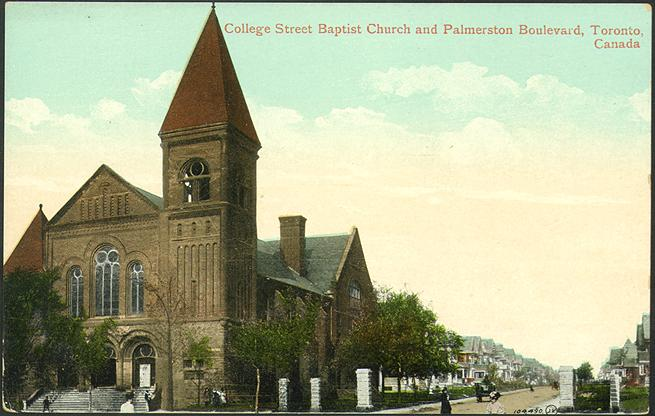
The Church at Palmerston and College Street, c1910

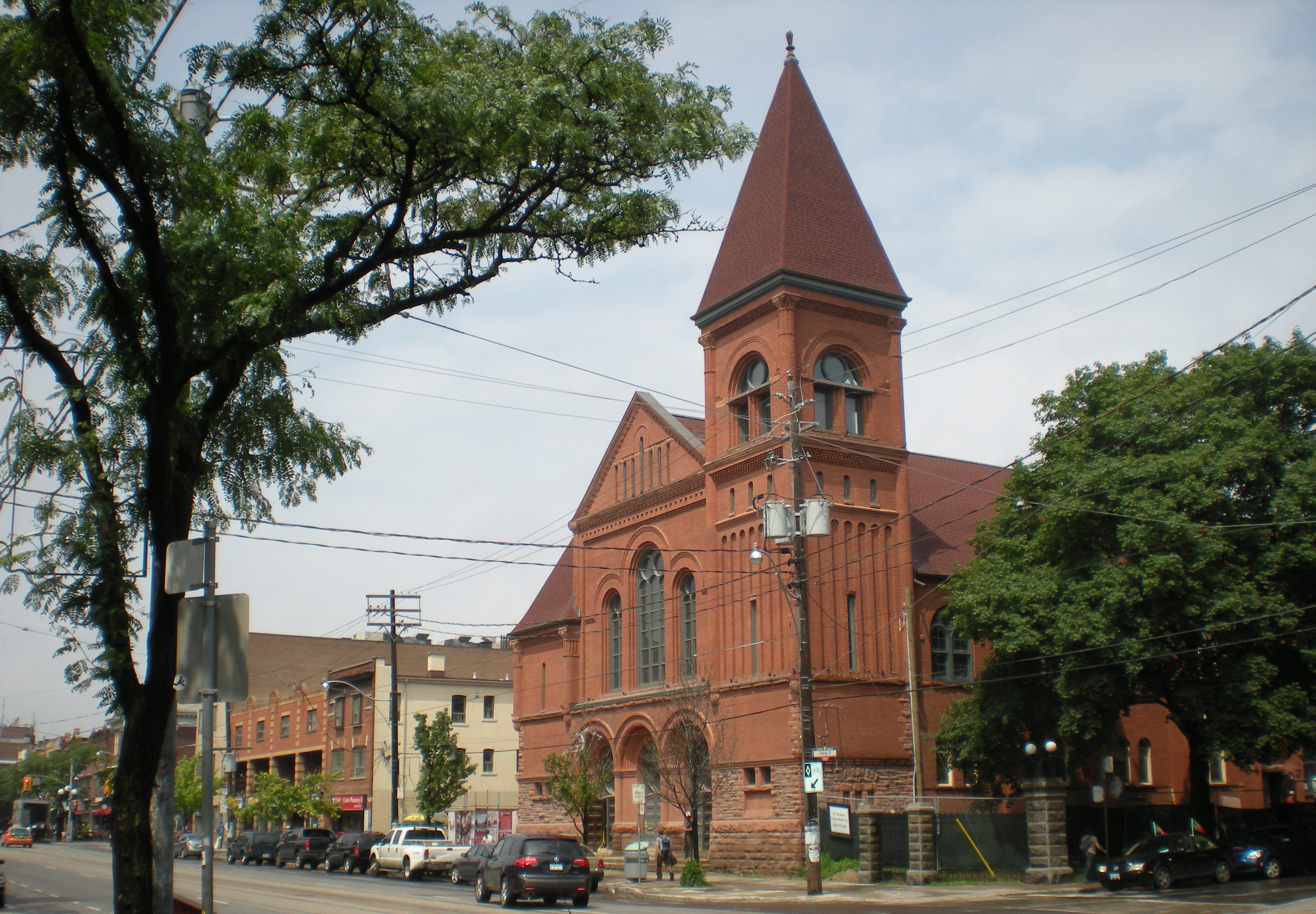
The Church at Palmerston and College Street, 2010

The church at College/Palmerston predates the development of the boulevard by about fifteen years. Originally the College Street Baptist Church, built in 1889, replacing a smaller structure constructed in 1872, was until recently used by a Portuguese-speaking Seventh-Day Adventist congregation which sold the property. A developer has converted the former church into condominium units. The Church was listed on Toronto's Heritage Properties Inventory in early 2006. In 2009, City Council approved the designation of the Church under Part IV, Section 29 of the Ontario Heritage Act.
