= Elmore Harris =

Canadian Baptist theologian (1855–1911)

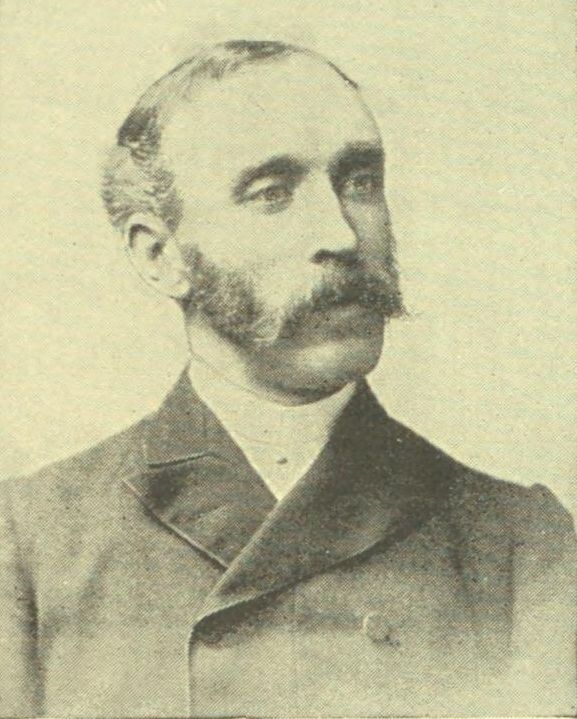
Elmore Harris n.d.

Elmore Harris (b. February 23, 1855 Beamsville, Ontario – d. December 19, 1911 Delhi, India) was a Canadian Baptist pastor. He was the founder of the Walmer Road Baptist Church and one of the founders of Toronto Bible Training School in 1894 which soon changed its name to Toronto Bible College (now Tyndale University).

== Background ==
Elmore Harris was the son of Alanson Harris (founder of A. Harris, Son & Co. Ltd.) & Mary Morgan. Elmore's paternal grandfather was John Harris an early Baptist pastor whose family had emigrated from New York state to the Oxford County area. Elmore's grandfather John Harris served in pastorates at Westminster (Middlesex County) and afterwards at Townsend (Haldimand County). Elmore's maternal grandfather was Thomas Morgan a minister originally from Wales who served in the U.S. and then in Southwestern Ontario. Elmore Harris married (September 7, 1877 at Brantford) Ruth Davidson Shenston (1858–1910). Ruth was the daughter of Thomas Strahan Shenston of whom the Shenstone Memorial Baptist Church in Brantford, Ontario is named. Together they had 5 children: Burton Shenstone, b. June 11, 1878; Helen Mary, b. February 1, 1881 (who became the mother of E. Harris Harbison); Frederick Morgan, b. June 12, 1886; Frank Elmore, b. December 7, 1890; Erdman Gordon, b. December 17, 1898. Elmore Harris was an uncle to Canadian painter Lawren Harris. Elmore remarried to Olive Marion Culham on September 6, 1911 in Toronto.

== Education ==
He received his early education at the High School, Beamsville, and subsequently at St. Catharines Collegiate Institute. In 1877 Elmore Harris obtained a B.A. from the University of Toronto having previously left behind the family business to pursue pastoral studies. At the McMaster convocation in May 1899 the degree of Doctor of Divinity, D.D. was conferred.

== Pastorates ==
From 1876 – February 1882 Elmore served at Centre Street Baptist Church, St. Thomas where he succeeded Mr. Hurd. During his pastorate at Centre St. the membership nearly tripled and they built a new building. February 1882 – October 15, 1889 Elmore served at Yorkville Baptist Church helping the church to expand into larger facilities at Bloor Street Baptist Church. (see Yorkminster Park Baptist Church (Toronto)). October 20, 1889 – November 27, 1895 Elmore served in the pastorate at Walmer Road Baptist Church.

== Accomplishments ==
During the years from 1871 to 1895, some 1,000 believers had been baptized by Mr. Harris. During his ministry in Toronto, 1882 to 1895, he organized the Bloor street church, Walmer road church, Ossington Avenue Baptist church, Century Baptist Church and Christie Street Baptist Church. Harris had a strong reputation for his expository preaching.

On May 14, 1894, a group of lay people from the Toronto churches of St. Paul's Anglican, Knox Presbyterian and Walmer Road Baptist met to discuss the establishment of a training school for laypersons. This group was led by Elmore Harris, and included the well-known Casimir Gzowski Jr. (son of the builder of the Grand Trunk Railway and grandfather of broadcaster Peter Gzowski), Robert Kilgour of the Kilgour Brothers (a manufacturer of paper bags and paper boxes), John Drysdale Nasmith (a baker) and Samuel J. Moore of the business forms fame (a Sunday school leader at Dovercourt Road Baptist Church). The Toronto Bible Training School, established in 1894, resulting from this initiative, was designed to prepare laypersons to serve in the burgeoning programs of the newly developing YMCA, numerous Sunday schools springing up in Toronto and outlying areas, and a growing world movement in missions. In 1912 the name was changed to Toronto Bible College (Tyndale University). Elmore Harris served as the first President of the school.

For many years Elmore Harris lectured at McMaster in Bible.

In 1893 Elmore Harris joined the board of China Inland Mission-Toronto.

From 1898-1903 Harris served on the Board of Governors of McMaster University. From 1906 Harris was Honorary lecturer on the English Bible at McMaster.

It was stated of Elmore Harris that under his direction he had "done more than any other member of the Baptist denomination (whether clerical or lay), by influence and pecuniary aid, to further the cause of that church in Toronto and its suburbs."

Elmore Harris and his wife were at some point elected Life Members of the Upper Canada Bible Society.

Upon his death he bequeathed to The Hospital For Sick Children, Toronto the payment of $2,000, been named in perpetuity in the Hospital in College street in 1912: — "The Frank Elmore Harris Cot," by bequest of the late Rev. Dr. Elmore Harris, Toronto;

== Beliefs ==
During his tenure at Bloor Street, Elmore became aware of the teaching of William Newton Clarke (1841-1912) a known Liberal theologian (who was a graduate of Hamilton Theological Seminary NY – later Colgate Theological Seminary). Clarke taught New Testament Interpretation and Homiletics at the Toronto Baptist College from September 1883-early 1887. It undoubtedly had an influence on his later beliefs and desire to fend for the truth.

Elmore Harris is named as one of the editors of the Scofield Reference Bible. He was Calvinistic and a proponent of premillennialism and dispensationalism. He was also an ardent Evangelical and helped build Gymnamsium YMCA type outreaches at Walmer Road Baptist Church. Harris was part of the editorial committee for the series of doctrinal tracts which were called The Fundamentals.

He was considered to represent orthodox evangelical fundamentalism in the McMaster Divinity College controversy surrounding the modernist teachings of Isaac George Matthews (1871-1959) professor of Old Testament and systematic theology at McMaster University from 1904 to 1919 who began to be criticized in 1908, but kept his job. (Matthews had been a student pastor at First Baptist Church in Brantford (where the Harris family attended) and was a graduate of McMaster, obtaining his PhD from University of Chicago). Elmore Harris addressed the McMaster senate in 1908, "I feel that the attitude of the Old Testament Scriptures in the Chair of the Old Testament Literature in this institution is not the attitude of the Baptist denomination." It was not only the lectures that concerned Harris but the books read by the students. Matthews view was to let the students figure things out for themselves. Harris believed that it was better for the students to be told what was right. Others like the dean of Theology (and professor of New Testament and Patristic Greek) Jones Hughes Farmer (1859-1928) noted that Baptists have always believed in personal freedom. (Ever after, McMaster was suspected by many Baptists as excessively liberal). Thomas Todhunter Shields began to take more of that role after the death of Elmore Harris.

Elmore Harris was likely an organizer behind R. A. Torrey’s evangelistic campaign held at Massey Hall in Toronto around January 28, 1906. In March 1909 under the auspices of the Bible League of Canada Harris and others invited James Orr (theologian) to Toronto for a series of lectures. Elmore Harris was considered "a remarkable soul-winner." It is also stated that he "lacked formal training in theology."
