= Yorkminster Park Baptist Church (Toronto) =

Church in Toronto, Canada

Coordinates: 43.69044°N 79.39439°W

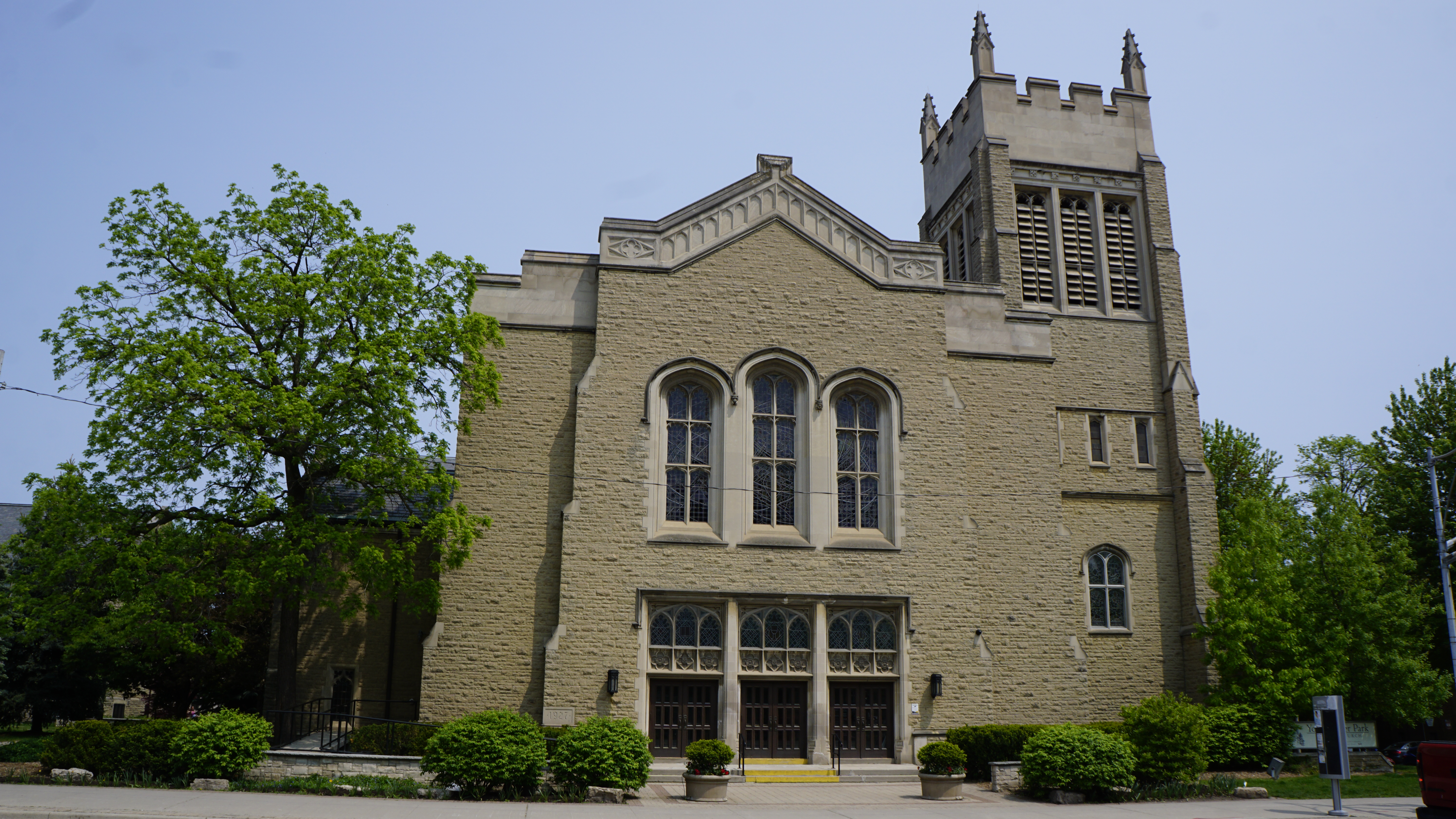
The front of Yorkminster Park Baptist Church in 2023

Yorkminster Park Baptist Church is a Baptist church located at 1585 Yonge Street in the Deer Park neighbourhood of Toronto in Ontario, Canada. It is affiliated with Canadian Baptists of Ontario and Quebec.

== History ==
The origins of the congregation date from 1829 under the leadership of “good old Dr. Caldicott”, a young Englishman who preached to a small gathering just south-east of King and Yonge Streets. By 1848, it had become Bond Street Baptist Church, just north-east of Yonge and Queen Streets. One of the young laymen of that congregation became Senator William McMaster, the chief benefactor of McMaster University.

Families of Bond Street Baptist Church living at Yorkville found it very inconvenient to go downtown for church services, and they conceived the idea of building in their own neighbourhood. In March 1870, a Sunday School mission was opened in what is now Toronto's Yorkville neighbourhood by a few workers from Bond Street to serve the northern neighbourhoods of the city; a regular prayer meeting soon followed. During that summer, a small chapel was built on Scollard Street, and it was opened on September 1, 1870. The church was officially recognized and dedicated a year later in 1871 with thirty members as Yorkville Baptist Church. Pastors during this era included James Pyper (who was once pastor of Bond Street Baptist Church), Joseph Kiner, John Torrance, Tolment Harris, and William Brookman from 1880 to June 1881. Brookman's appointment was called into question by Joshua Denovan (then pastor of Alexander Street Baptist Church) as holding views not in harmony with orthodoxy (he was in sympathy with views brought forth by Charles Taze Russell). He left the congregation in June 1881 to form an independent congregation.

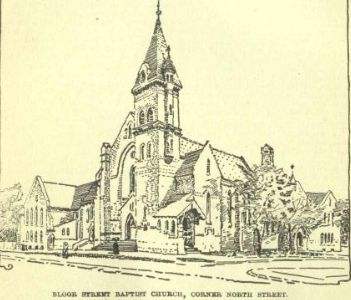
Bloor Street Baptist Church in 1904

In February 1882, Elmore Harris, formerly of Brantford (son of Alanson Harris, owner and founder of A. Harris, Son & Co. Ltd.), came to help pastor the church until 1889, when he resigned to pastor a new church (Walmer Road Baptist Church) located in The Annex section of Toronto (a bit west of Yorkville). During the pastorate of Elmore Harris, the congregation had grown from about seventy members to nearly five hundred. This growth of the congregation justified the construction of a new brick church. Built in 1882, the Toronto architect E. J. Lennox was commissioned to design the new building at the south-east corner of Bloor and Bay Streets (now the site of the Manufacturer’s Life building). The new church was renamed Bloor Street Baptist Church and remained on that site until 1926.

In October 1886, the congregation of Bloor Street Baptist Church took on the oversight of the work at Ossington Avenue Baptist Church. Also during the tenure of Elmore Harris, the church planted a congregation on Birch Street (known as Century Baptist Church) beginning in 1888, which continued until 1970, at which time it amalgamated with Blythwood Road Baptist Church that was built in 1955 (See www.blythwood.org). Members of the Century Baptist Church also started an outreach (in 1911), which became known as Mt. Pleasant Road Baptist Church (See http://www.mprbc.org/). Prominent members (and deacons) during this time were Chancellor Boyd of Toronto Baptist College and Albert Henry Newman, professor of history at McMaster University.

On the resignation of Elmore Harris, he was succeeded in 1891 by Oates Charles Symonds Wallace, M.A. (1856–1947), who remained in the pastorate until the early part of 1895, when he was appointed Chancellor of McMaster University. He was succeeded by Charles Aubrey Eaton, who resigned in 1901. Eaton's pastorate was a successful one. He not only kept his congregation together, but during the time he was in charge, the handsome school-room adjoining the church was built, furnished, and in a great measure paid for. This building was completed in 1900, and is a substantial piece of evidence to Eaton's work. J.D. Freeman served from 1901 to 1908.

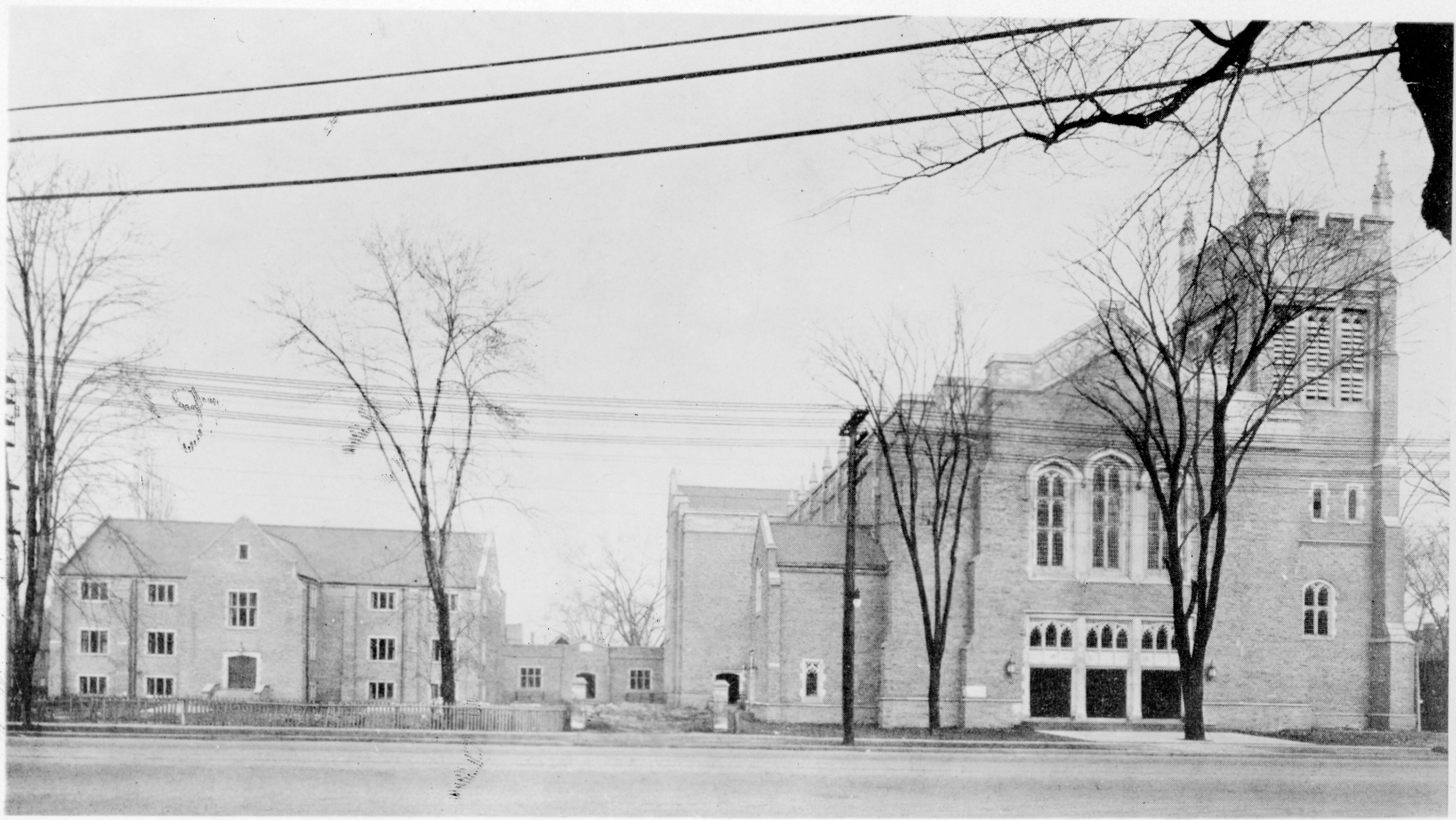
The current building in the late 1920s

Led by W.A. Cameron (1882–1956), the senior minister of the congregation beginning in 1908, the rapidly growing congregation required bigger premises (the Uptown Theatre, now demolished, accommodated the overflow for Sunday evening services). In the 1920s, the decision was made to erect a much larger church at Deer Park, a rapidly growing residential community in what was then the city's northern area. The building was designed in 1927 and under construction that year. On 25 March 1928, the sanctuary was formally opened and dedicated as Yorkminster Baptist Church.

Park Road Baptist Church was founded in 1922, and a new church was constructed on the corner of Park Road and Asquith Avenue in 1927. The architects for that church were J. Francis Brown and Son of Toronto. It was completed in 1928 to a design by the architectural firm of George, Moorhouse and King. The church was well-known in the Bloor and Yonge area, especially for its music program. Unfortunately, a fire in March 1961 destroyed a large part of the Church House and left the sanctuary with minor structural damage. As the neighbourhood was rapidly changing with the arrival of office buildings, due consideration was given to repairing the damaged structure and selling the property, or uniting with the Yorkminster congregation. The decision to unite with Yorkminster was made, and the first business meeting of the combined congregations took place in October 1961. The congregation was renamed Yorkminster Park Baptist Church.

Since W.A. Cameron, the church has had six other senior ministers – Emlyn Davies (1951–1961), Murray Ford (1962-1965), John Gladstone (1965–1991), Kerr Speirs (1991–1999), and the current minister, Peter Holmes (2001–present).

== Architecture ==
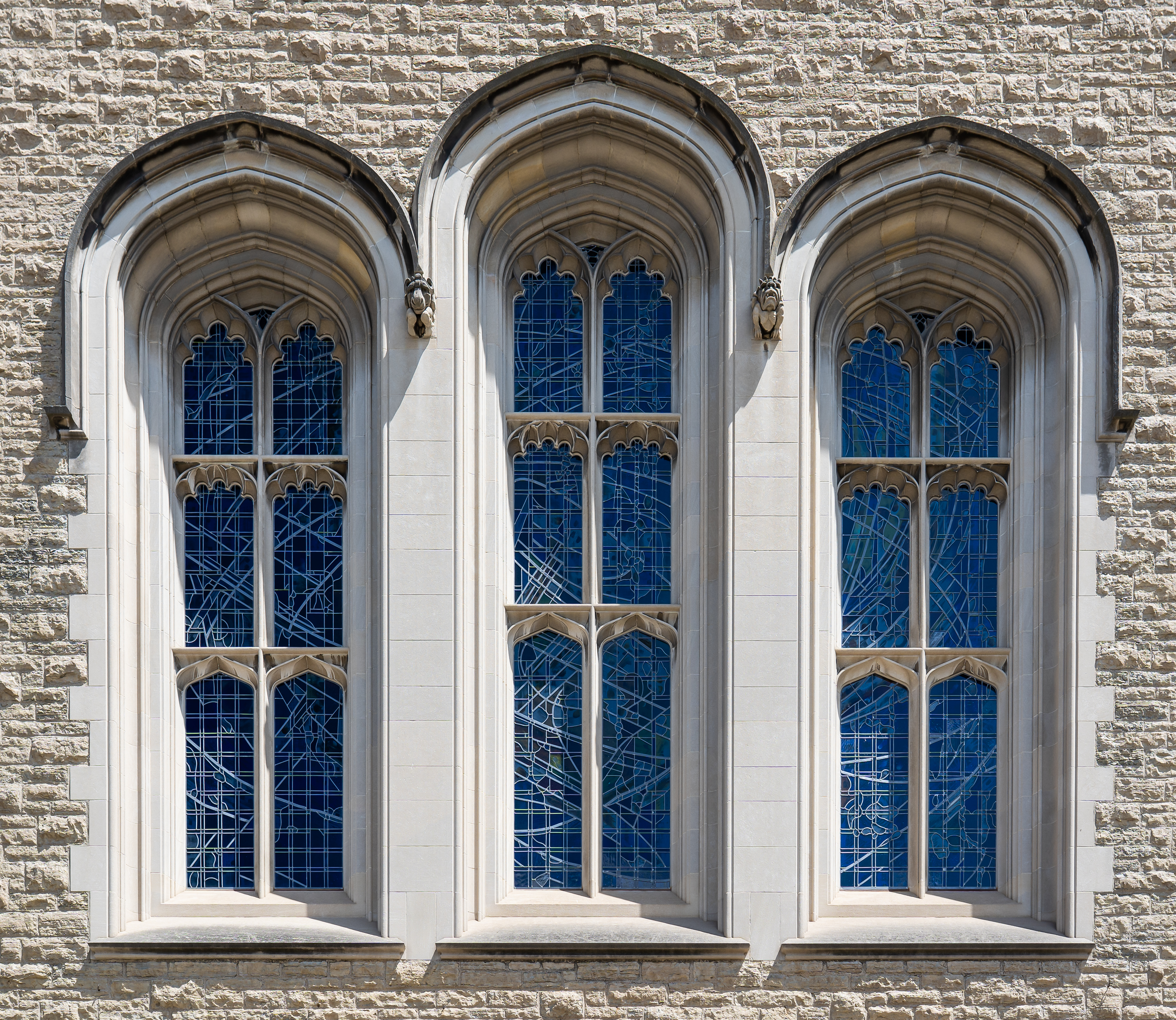
Windows above the front entrance

Built in the Tudor Gothic Revival style, the church is made of Owen Sound rubble stone walls, with Indiana limestone used for the piers, arches and traceried windows in the aisles, nave, and transepts.

Its immense size gives Yorkminster Park seating for 1,200 people in the main sanctuary, with room for 500 more in the transept and galleries. This is made possible, in part, by having a 55-foot nave unobstructed by pillars, a feat accomplished by a technique not available to the medieval architects of the original York Minster – a steel trussed roof.

From the west wall to the chancel steps is 158 feet, and the crossing measures 107 feet.

=== Features ===
The entrance wall to the church's tower includes a piece of carved stone from York Minster cathedral. A brass plaque below the carved stone reads:

This stone for more than five hundred years formed a part of one of the mullions of the clerestory windows of York Minster, the great cathedral founded at York, England, in 927 A.D., and was presented to this church by the Dean of the ancient Minster.

The church has in the last fifty years been creating a collection of stained glass windows in the sanctuary that cover a wide range of biblical and secular themes, both historical and allegorical. By the diversity of their themes, the windows illustrate that valuable lessons may be learned from all of history and literature. These windows have been donated in memoriam and add significant beauty to the church.

== Music ==
The church's great four-manual pipe organ was donated by The Honourable Albert Edward Matthews and family. This superb organ was built by Casavant Frères of St. Hyacinthe, Quebec, and installed in 1928. It is registered as Casavant Frères Opus 1241. Tonal revision and the addition of some new stops was carried out in 1965; two stops were added in 1971; a new console was installed in 1975. The Yorkminster Park organ is now one of the finest instruments in Canada, containing 77 stops and 5,328 pipes. In 1985 and 1988 renovation programs were begun which included necessary repairs, improvement in tonal quality, the addition of a floating trumpet stop and the capture-action electronic memory for the console. Yorkminster Park is one of the leading organ recital halls in Canada.

In 1933, the first “Carols by Candlelight” concert of Christmas music was presented in Toronto at Yorkminster, and the choral service has become a longstanding tradition in the city. The choir enjoys a strong reputation for the quality of its singing.

Noonday Organ Recitals, free to the public, take place each Wednesday from 12:30 to 1:00 p.m., except during the summer months.

== Gallery ==
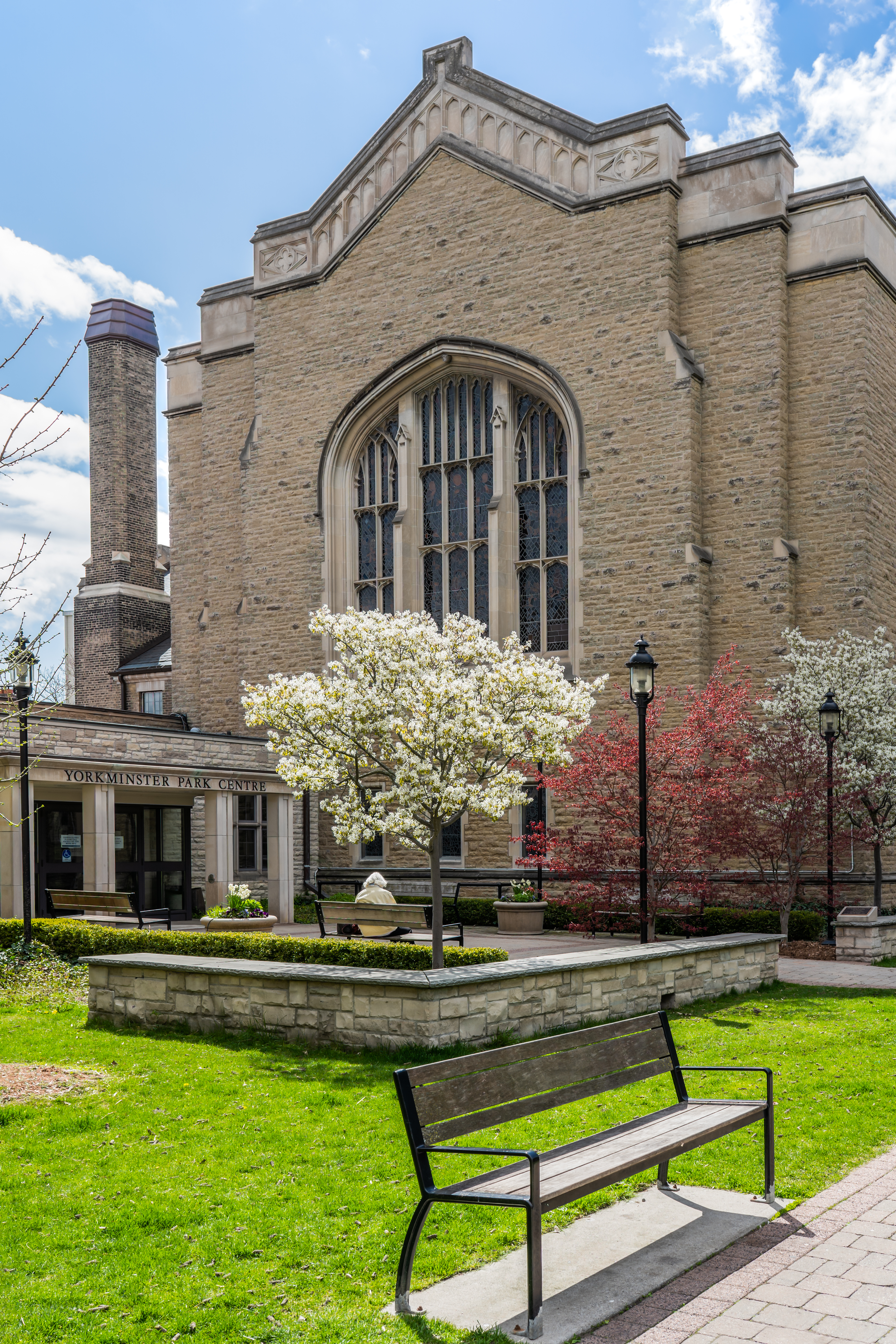
The entrance to the Yorkminster Park Centre

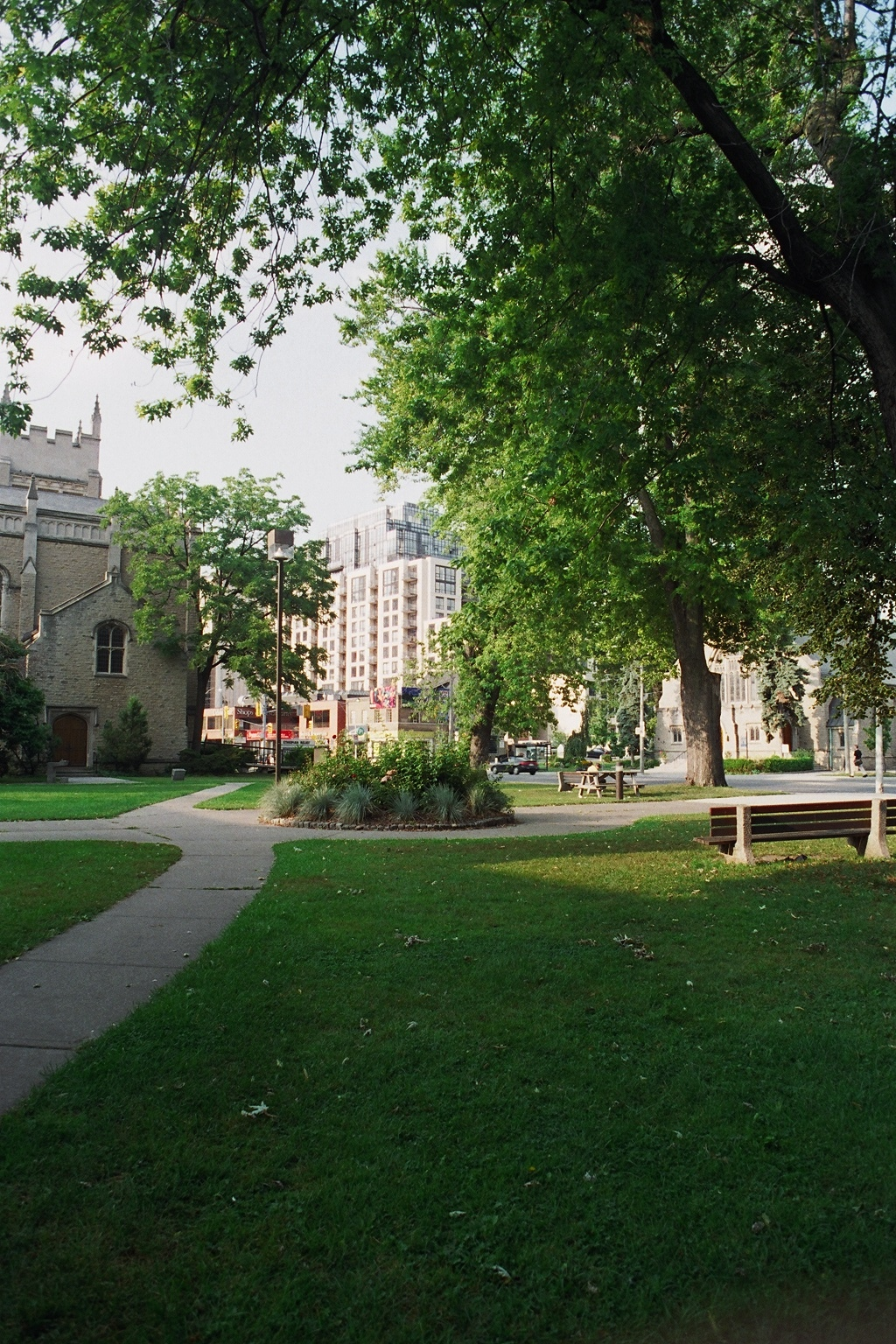
The church's park area

== See also ==
- Baptists in Canada
