= Bond Street Baptist Church =

Coordinates: 43°39′14″N 79°22′39″W

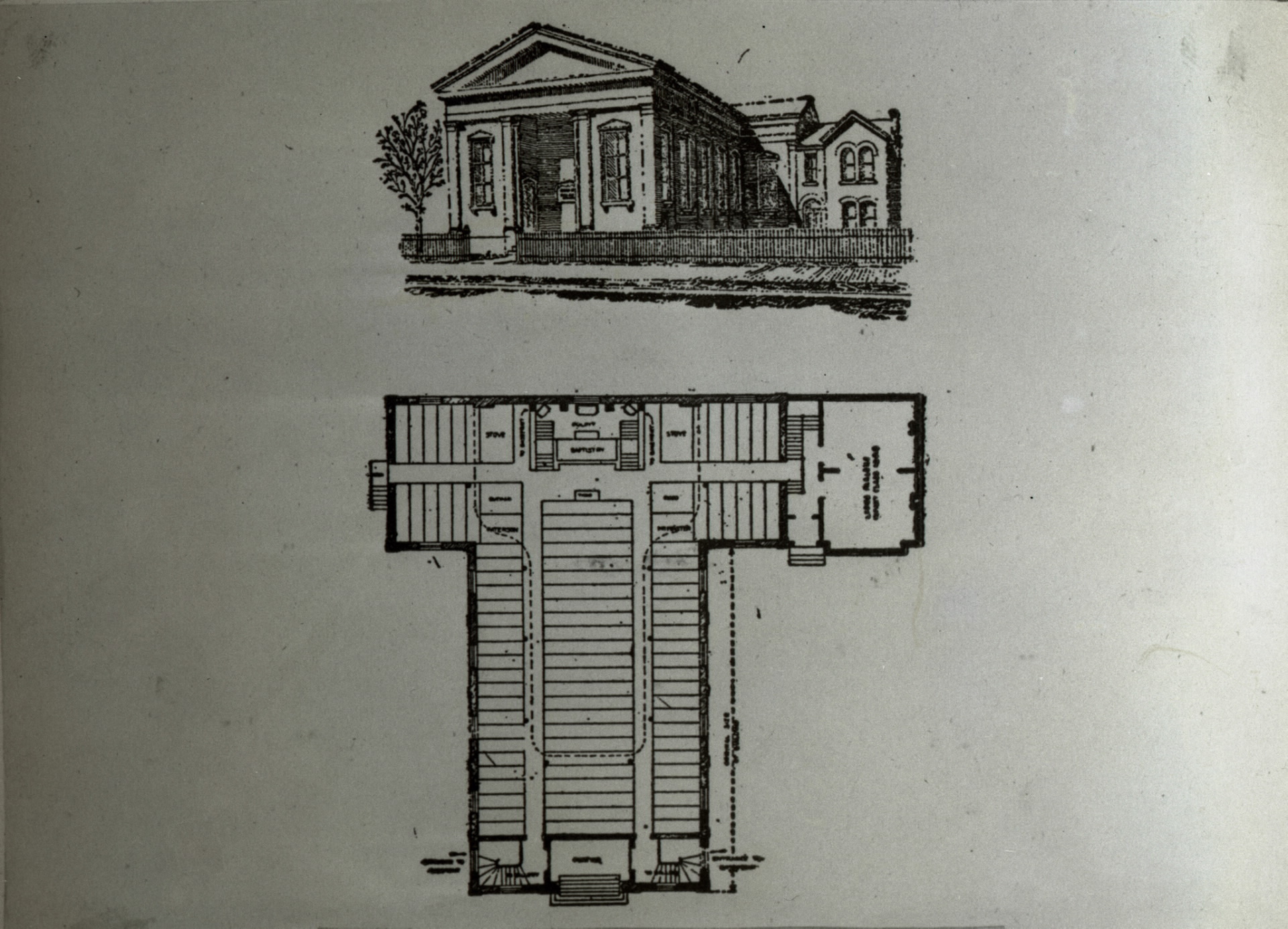
Bond St. Baptist Church (Toronto; 1848–1875)

Bond Street Baptist Church built originally in 1848 represented the first permanently established Baptist congregation in the city of Toronto (then York), Canada.

== Background ==
March St. Baptist Church (Toronto; 1832)

At the outbreak of the War of 1812, Baptist life in Ontario was little more than embryonic. There were fourteen churches in all with at total membership of around 400. These first Regular Baptist churches in Ontario were linked together in two fledgling associations: the Thurlow Association (later called the Haldimand Association) consisting mostly of churches between Cobourg and Kingston and the Clinton Conference made up of four churches—Charlotteville, Townsend, Clinton, and Oxford. Theologically, these two associations were Calvinistic and amillennial in doctrine. The germ of the Baptist church in Toronto was planted in 1827, at which time a few people of this faith met in an upper room on Colborne Street, although there was no permanency until 1840.

In the minutes of the old St. George's Masonic Lodge, No. 9, there is a reference which shows there was a Baptist organization in that year. In the minutes of this lodge of July 6, 1827, it is stated that "Bros. Rose and Watson be authorized to rent the lodge room to the Baptist congregation at 7s, 6d. currency per month if they choose to accept on these terms." On October 3 of the same year the following report was read : "We, Walter Rose and Richard Watson, being fully empowered by St. George's Lodge, No. 9, to rent the lodge room for the sole use and benefit of a Sunday meeting, and none other, and that the said David Paterson have the free use of the said room on the Sabbath days for a period of six months, and the same be delivered to him in a clean state at 7s. 6d. provincial currency, monthly. He shall keep the house in careful and clean state, and deliver it in such state when the congregation leaves off the use of it." The house here referred to was a two-storey frame building on Colborne street. The first meeting of which there is any official record was held on October 16, 1829, when the late Joseph Wenhlam, of the Bank of Upper Canada, was appointed to keep a regular account of the transactions of the church. It would seem from incidental allusions in the minutes that one or more meetings had been held before, but there is no record of what was said or done at those supposed meetings. The old church records are very meagre, being confined to dry statements of facts or resolutions. No list of the members has been preserved in the church books, so that it is doubtful whether anyone knows with certainty who were the real constituent members of the church; only a few names appearing regularly in the minutes. Alexander Stewart was the first "president" or pastor of the little church.

In 1832, the first chapel was built (later called the Newsboys Home) on what was then known as March, (later, Stanley, but now Lombard street). At that time the street had been laid out, but there were scarcely any buildings on it, and it was thought it might become one of the best streets in the city. The chapel itself was far from being attractive, besides being very small, its seating capacity being about one hundred and sixty. Unfortunately the street became known as one of the rougher parts of town with local residents making church services very difficult even requiring police officers to patrol the streets to keep the peace during evening worship services. Church life was difficult with leadership difficulties included. The congregation on March Street was officially organized on October 31, 1840, the previous congregations having become defunct. William McMaster a prominent Toronto businessman and an immigrant from County Tyrone, Ireland during the month of May 1848, united with the church by experience.

== History ==
Bond Street (Toronto; 1861)

After meeting in temporary facilities on present day Colborne and Lombard Streets a building which became known as Bond Street Baptist Church Toronto, Ontario was built (located on the property of the current St. Michael's Hospital (Toronto) on Bond St., w. side, between Queen & Shuter Sts.). It opened for worship in June 1848 and enlarged through 1852 and served until 1875 when it was superseded by Jarvis Street Baptist Church. It was built by members of the earlier Lombard St. Baptist grouping. It was separate and distinct from the earlier African American congregation known as First Baptist Church (Toronto). During this era the church held morning services at 11, evening services at 6 and Sabbath school (Sunday school) at 2:30 in the afternoon. The building on Bond St. was sold and used in 1892 by the Sisters of St. Joseph, who operated the Notre Dame des Anges, a boarding house for working women which later became St. Michael's Hospital (Toronto).

== Outreach ==
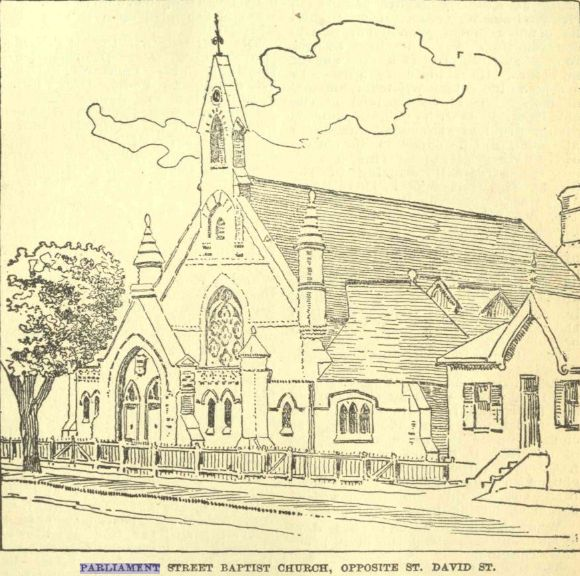
Parliament St. Baptist Church (Toronto; late 1800s)

Bond Street also helped to sponsor a work known as Alexander Street Baptist Church in 1867 located on the south side of Alexander Street between Yonge and Church streets. The Yorkville Baptist Church began also as an outreach (see Yorkminster Park Baptist Church (Toronto)) and was organized in 1872.

Parliament Street Baptist Church was started as an outreach and had a missionary pastor in 1871. It was located at the corner of St. David St. (now a small park in the Regent Park neighbourhood of Toronto (formerly Cabbagetown, Toronto)). The Bond St. congregation was also active in a work which was continued at Jarvis Street which later became Beverley Street Baptist Church. As a participant in the greater outreach of Baptists in Toronto there was involvement also in the work that became College Street Baptist Church.

== Pastors ==
Pastors in the timeline include:

- Washington Christian, an African American Baptist minister who undoubtedly had some influence on the early meetings in the St. George's Masonic Lodge building and later the Lombard St. building and eventually helped form First Baptist Church (Toronto). see http://fbctoronto.ca/
- Alexander Stewart (originally from Perth, Ontario) pastored during the 1830s until 1836. He was considered a wandering missionary among the early Baptists. From 1836 to 1840 there was no regular pastor except for a J. E. Maxwell.
- Thomas Ford Caldicott (b. March 21, 1803 Long Buckby, Northamptonshire, England - d. July 9, 1869 Toronto, Ontario) was one of the founding elders (ordained in 1834 at Chinguacousy and a year later moved to the U.S.) was officially established as pastor in October 1860 continuing until his death in July 1869. The question of systematic benevolence was always strongly promoted by Dr. Caldicott, and the Weekly offertory was adopted during the last weeks of his life.
- W. H. Combes, Samuel Tapscott in 1837, James Campbell served from July 1840 to Sept. 1844.
- Robert Alexander Fyfe (1816–1878) became pastor in 1844 until July 1848 and later from October 1855 to 1860. In 1844 membership stood around 60 but grew greatly affording the need of a new building during his first tenure. In 1860 he left to become the first principal at Woodstock College (then Canadian Literary Institute) from 1860 to 1878. Under Fyfe's leadership mission services were begun in the western part of the city. This mission eventually grew into the Beverley Street Baptist Church.
- James Pyper (1807–1884) (from Michigan) pastored from 1848 to July 1855. Pyper served on the board of The Regular Baptist Missionary Society of Canada from its beginning in 1851. He was co-editor with John Inglis (from London, Ontario) for the Christian Messenger from 1851 to 1853 and espoused the newer premillennial view. Pyper had been influenced by the Millerism viewpoint. Pyper also had a few sermons on baptism published in 1851. Pyper was a good friend to Alexander Campbell (clergyman) who also preached in the pulpit during his visit to Toronto in 1856.
- William Boyd Stewart (1835–1912) was called to be assistant pastor in 1869 but assumed the full pastorate upon the death of T. F. Caldicott. In 1871 he was living at 80 Bond St. which may have been a parsonage. Stewart served until May 1872. Stewart later served from 1894 to 1911 in various offices of the Toronto Bible Training Institute including being the first principal.
- John Harvard Castle (1830–1890) (from Philadelphia), became pastor in February 1873 and transferred to the new building at Jarvis Street in 1875.

== See also ==
- Baptists in Canada
