= Walmer Road Baptist Church =

Church building in Toronto, Canada

Coordinates: 43.66851°N 79.40686°W

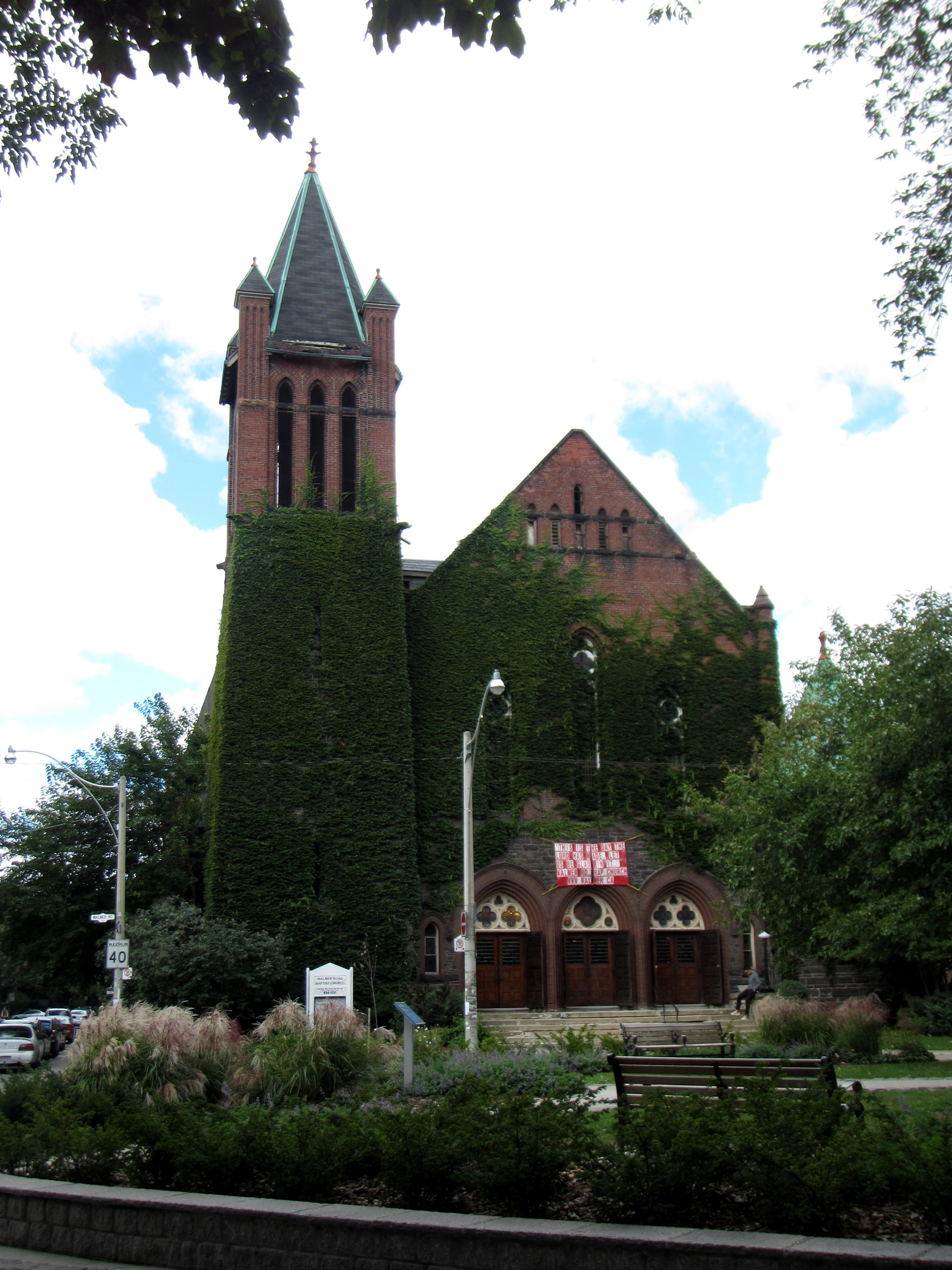
Walmer Road Baptist Church

Walmer Road Baptist Church is a Baptist church in Toronto, Ontario, Canada. It is affiliated with the Canadian Baptists of Ontario and Quebec (CBOQ).

== History ==
In early 1889, Elmore Harris, then-pastor of Bloor Street Baptist Church (later to become Yorkminster Park Baptist Church), decided there was a need for a new ministry in the northwestern part of Toronto that had been recently annexed to the city. After consulting with his congregation, Walmer Road was selected as the most suitable spot for the new church. Elmore Harris' father, Alanson Harris of Brantford (founder of A. Harris, Son & Co. Ltd.) purchased the lot on Walmer Road at the corner of what was soon to become Lowther Avenue, at a cost of $7,600.

In April 1889, Elmore Harris resigned as pastor of Bloor Street Church, effective October 15, 1889. The first building (which can now be identified by the short tower some distance west along Lowther Avenue) was completed and opened on October 20, 1889. Sixty-two people transferred from the Bloor Street Church and became the Charter members. By 1891, the membership had increased to about 350, and in December, it was decided that more space was necessary. Mr. Alanson Harris and Mrs. John Harris agreed to provide the funds, and what is now the main sanctuary of the church was erected at a cost of $70,000. Upon completion, it was the largest Baptist building in Canada. The dedication of the new sanctuary took place on November 6, 1892.

For over 125 years, Walmer Road Baptist Church has been a community with a commitment to outreach and service in the Annex, with a reputation for creative leadership by skilled pastors and involved lay people. A detailed history of the church can be found in two documents: A Century for the City published in 1989 and Walmer at 125 published in 2014.

== Architecture ==
Walmer Road Baptist Church was designed and built in 1889 and 1892 in the Gothic Revival style by the architectural firm of Henry Langley and his nephew Edmund Burke. The interior of the church was built to accommodate 1,540 people on the floor and in the galleries. In 1912, the church entered its next and last building program: a new structure was erected in the space between the two older buildings and was dedicated as the Ruth Shenstone Harris Memorial Church School on January 18, 1914. A comprehensive renovation of this Education Wing was undertaken in 2000.

== Outreach ==
Outreach and church planting were primary activities of the church from its establishment. In 1898, the Christie Street Mission was founded by the congregation from Walmer Road, which in 1907 became Christie Street Baptist Church under pastor H. R. Nobles.

In 1907, the Spadina Road Mission was created to serve the area at Spadina and St. Clair Ave. In 1914, the Mission merged with Wychwood Road Baptist Church to the west, when a new bridge across the ravine brought that church within easy reach.

In 1909, the Hewitt Avenue Mission was begun in the Brockton Village neighbourhood (now Roncesvalles, Toronto) on Hewitt Avenue. It eventually became High Park Baptist Church.

In October 1911, the Memorial Institute became a ministry of Walmer when they agreed to take over the work of Memorial Baptist Church, on Tecumseth Street south west of Queen and Bathurst in downtown Toronto. The location continued to provide ministry to poor people living in downtown Toronto until 1942, when it ceased operation.

== Training the laity ==
In 1894, Elmore Harris and Dr. William Stewart, a Walmer supporter, suggested that the church provide space for a lay training institute, to be known as the Toronto Bible Training School; Stewart became the first principal. Courses were held at Walmer Road church for the first four years, then relocated to new facilities at 110 College Street in 1898. The vision of the founders was to train laypeople as Sunday school teachers, pastors' assistants, and as city, home and foreign missionaries. Initially, the training program was two years. In 1912, it became the Toronto Bible College and is now the Tyndale University College and Seminary.

During Howard Bentall's time as pastor in the 1950s, the idea of a lay training institute was renewed, and beginning in September 1955, the Baptist Training Institute (BTI) was formed. It was designed as a one-year lay training program and at first, classes were conducted at the church. In 1959, BTI was relocated to Brantford, Ontario.

== Pastors ==
Elmore Harris served from October 1889 to November 27, 1895, when he resigned as pastor on account of failing health. Harris continued to serve in an advisory capacity until his death in 1911. Rev. W. W. Weeks, from First Baptist Church, Moncton, New Brunswick, began at Walmer Road Church in December 1895. The membership at that date was 480: by 1900, it was 700. Mr. Weeks served until 1904 and was considered "an earnest preacher and a most indefatigable worker". In 1905, Weeks was followed by Oliver Horsman from New Jersey, but he was soon involved in a doctrinal controversy and resigned in January, 1906.

In 1906, John MacNeill arrived from First Baptist Church in Winnipeg. At 32 years old, he already had a reputation as a preacher and evangelist. He had studied at McMaster University and knew Toronto well. He proved to be a reliable pastor for Walmer during a difficult time; in his 23 years at Walmer, the church grew to a membership of over 2,000. MacNeill resigned in 1930 to become the Principal of the Theological Faculty of McMaster University. At the same time, McMaster was relocated to Hamilton Ontario.

In 1930, John MacNeill's successor was chosen to be Dr. Herbert H. Bingham, coming from First Baptist Calgary. Although a strong preacher and evangelist, and much-loved by the congregation, he faced the challenge of succeeding a well-known and well-liked pastor, as well as leading the church during a time of economic hardship. Over 10 and a half years, he added 766 members, over 350 by baptism.

In June 1940, Dr. Bingham resigned to become the first full-time general secretary of the Baptist Convention of Ontario and Quebec, and in these early days of World War II, the church turned to Adiel Jarrett Moncrief, who began his ministry October 26, 1941. Like Bingham, Moncrief came from a large church (First Baptist Church in Tampa, Florida), was the author of numerous books, and had a strong reputation as a leader. However, leading Walmer during wartime represented a significant challenge: he served effectively through the war years, but on December 28, 1945, Adiel Moncrief submitted his resignation.

In 1947, Walmer Road called on Howard Bentall for his skill in preaching: a young Western Canadian and pastor of First Baptist, Regina. Bentall arrived November 3, 1946 and the results of his ministry were notable, as the next decade saw growth in many areas, including work with young people, ESL programs, and a renewed commitment to mission. In 1959, Howard Bentall resigned after almost 13 years of ministry—a period of service second only in length to John MacNeill's. During those years, about 800 members were added, 215 by baptism.

When Bentall left for First Baptist Church, Calgary, he was replaced by a Maritimer, Harvey L. Denton, who commenced his ministry on September 20, 1959. Denton came from Murray Street Baptist in Peterborough. While he retired in 1963, much of Denton's time at Walmer would be spent assessing the implications of a report on ministry.

In 1963, Harvey Denton resigned and was followed by Reginald S. Dunn, also from the Atlantic provinces. Dunn came to Walmer on February 6, 1964, after 11 years at First Baptist Church in Montreal. He would go on demonstrate leadership by facilitating one of the most active phases of ministry in Walmer's history with his philosophy of working hard in one area; that area being community outreach. However, he also maintained a traditional program within the church, in addition to educational and social programs to provide the stability needed within Walmer to support outreach. He served as President of the Canadian Council of Churches from 1966 to 1969. In 1971, Dunn resigned and moved to Amherst, Nova Scotia.

To lead Walmer through the 1970s, the congregation turned to Bruce W. Neal, an Ontario native, from James Street Baptist Church in Hamilton. He arrived at Walmer in 1973 with a reputation as an excellent preacher and worship leader, while also being noted for being in touch with the real world. Neal's 12 years at Walmer saw a growing young adult ministry, and a renewed look at worship. Bruce Neal resigned in the spring of 1984. The length of his tenure as senior pastor was exceeded only by the tenures of MacNeill and Bentall.

In October 1984, Dr. Daniel Dryer arrived with his love for the city and a renewed concern for the Annex community. Under his leadership, a number of innovative changes were made in the lead up to the celebration of Walmer's centennial in 1989, including the establishment of house groups as a formal part of the church's discipleship program. During this time, the BCOQ's BUILD program was partially housed at the church. Dan Dryer retired at the end of 1993.

In July 1995, Michael Blair was called to be the new senior pastor. Blair brought a skilled preaching ministry, as well as administrative skills. He helped the church work toward a new structure for leadership and guided the church to create the concept of the Walmer Centre in preparation for the major renovation of the education wing of the church, which was undertaken in 2000. In 2001, Michael Blair resigned.

After a lengthy search, Steve Cox was called as lead pastor in February 2004, bringing to the community his deep commitment to evangelism and his skills in guiding worship. In 2008, Steve's wife, Buff (Elizabeth)—also an ordained minister—joined the pastoral staff as Director of Administration. Under her guidance, among many other activities, a major project called "Under the Roof " led to the replacement of the slate on the north side of the sanctuary roof. However, following a two-year battle with cancer, Buff died in 2012, and in early 2014, Steve Cox resigned after ten years of ministry at Walmer.

In December 2015, Rev. Elaine Poproski from First Baptist Church, Simcoe Ontario, accepted a call to Walmer. She began her ministry on Palm Sunday in 2016.

== See also ==
- Baptists in Canada
