= William Boyd Stewart =

Scottish pastor

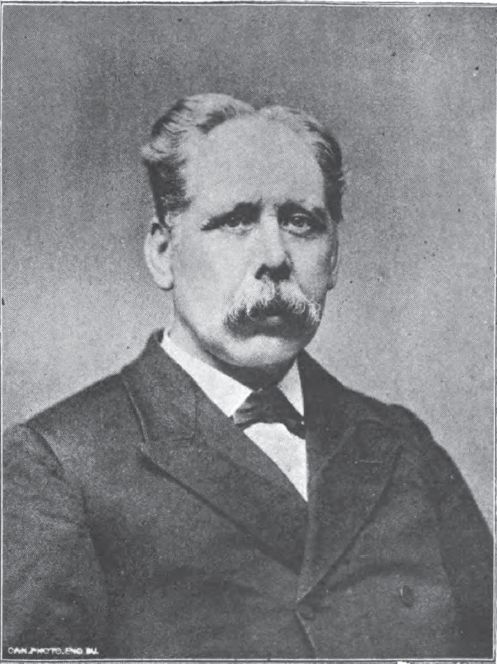
W. B. Stewart n.d.

William Boyd Stewart (July 27, 1834 in Haddam, Dumfrieshire, Scotland – March 5, 1912 in Toronto) was a pastor, writer, and educator in the Baptist denomination of Canada.

== Background ==
William Boyd Stewart was born the son of Alexander and Jane Stewart. After finishing university he emigrated to Canada in 1856.

On 28 February 1860, he married Augusta A. Kilborn (February 15, 1835 Beamsville - February 18, 1911 Toronto, Ontario) at Beamsville, Ontario. Together they had several children:

- Maggie Marie, b. 1861. She married William George Wallace, a Presbyterian minister. Their son W. Stewart Wallace (1884–1970) became a respected historian, librarian, and editor
- Annie Jane, b. March 8, 1864. She was the mother of painter Lawren Harris
- Nellie Kilborn, b. May 22, 1870
- William Kilborne Stewart, b. January 2, 1875. He taught at Dartmouth College for forty years.
- Lizzie Lyon, b. June 29, 1878.

== Education ==
Stewart studied at the Annan Academy and later at the University of Glasgow in his native Scotland. Later in 1860 he was entered into an ad eundem degree at the University of Rochester. At some later date Stewart was awarded the honorary Doctor of Divinity degree.

== Pastorates ==
Prior to October 1859 Stewart served in the pastorate of Beamsville Baptist Church in Beamsville, Ontario. He was ordained in Toronto in 1859. After this he served at Cheltenham Baptist Church in Cheltenham, Ontario (beginning before he was married) from October 1859 until June 1860 when he left to take up a teaching position at the Canadian Literary Institute in Woodstock.

Stewart re-entered the ministry at First Baptist Church Brantford, Ontario beginning August 1863 to May, 1869. During his pastorate Americus Vespucius Timpany (the first missionary of the Baptists in Canada) was ordained for the missionary work in Kakinada, India in October, 1867. During 1869 Stewart was called to be assistant pastor of Bond Street Baptist Church in Toronto, Ontario but immediately assumed the full pastorate upon the death of Thomas Ford Caldicott. He served in the capacity of Pastor until May 1872 citing ill health.

Sometime after leaving Bond Street Stewart served as pastor of Park Street Baptist Church, Hamilton, Ontario during the latter 1870s (later it re-integrated with James Street Baptist Church).

Stewart served as Interim Pastor at Parliament Street Baptist Church from the fall of 1893-early 1894. He also served in various interim or fill-in capacities throughout the Toronto area Baptist churches including Zion Baptist, Eglinton throughout the time period from 1894 to 1900.

== Teaching ==
William Stewart taught high school shortly after his arrival in Canada. From 1860 to 1863 he became the Professor of Classics at the Canadian Literary Institute (later Woodstock College). In 1869 he was appointed the superintendent of the schools for Brantford.

From 1890 to 1892 Stewart served as President of Berea College in Berea, Kentucky. He was succeeded by William Goodell Frost. Somewhere around this time he also served as the principal of a "Theological College" in Nashville, Tennessee (possibly Nashville Bible College).

Stewart served from 1894 to 1911 in various offices of the Toronto Bible Training Institute (later Toronto Bible College). In 1894 he became the institute’s first principal. He also served as a teacher.

== Accomplishments ==
Stewart served on various committees of the Baptist Convention including the French Regular Baptist Missionary Society (beginning in 1863), The Church Edifice Society (beginning in 1867), and The Foreign Mission Society (beginning in 1866). During the 1870s until 1876 Stewart served as Secretary for the Home Mission Board. From the late 1860s until 1882 William Stewart served as Editor for the Canadian Baptist.

== Beliefs ==
Stewart taught against 'modern dancing'. He also espoused the more traditional Premillennial viewpoint.

== See also ==
- Tyndale University College and Seminary
