= W. Stewart Wallace =

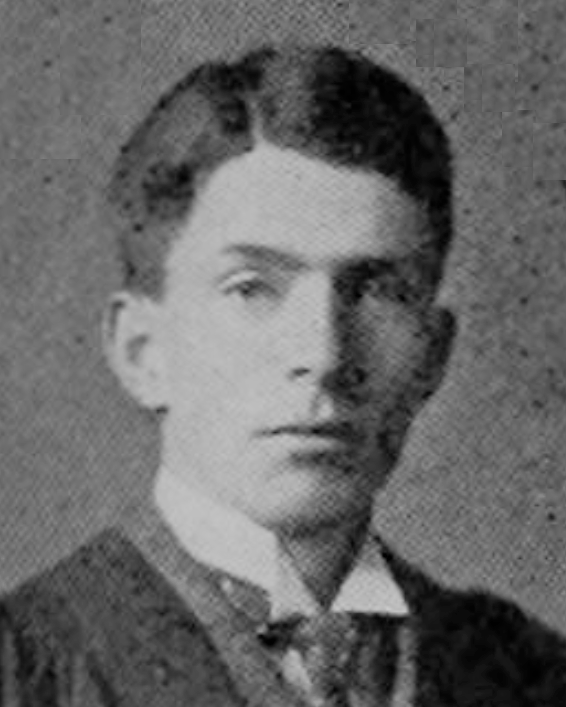
- Born: William Stewart Wallace; 23 June 1884; Georgetown, Ontario, Canada
- Died: 11 March 1970 (aged 85); Toronto, Ontario, Canada
- Occupations: Professor, librarian, author
- Years active: 1906 - 1954
- Spouse: Isabel Dora Graeme Robertson (b. 1883, m. 1913)
- Children: Mary Marcia Wood; Ian Stewart Wallace

Academic background
- Education: University of Toronto (B.A., 1906); Balliol College, Oxford (B.A., 1909), (M.A., 1912)

Academic work
- Institutions: University of Toronto
- Notable works: Encyclopedia of Canada (1935 – 1937)
- Notable ideas: The economic interpretation of history is not the only interpretation, but it is the deepest interpretation
- Influenced: Harold Innis
- Military career
- Allegiance: Canada
- Branch: Canadian Army
- Service years: 1915 – 1918
- Rank: Major
- Units: 139th (Northumberland) Battalion, CEF; 3rd Battalion (Toronto Regiment), CEF; 1st Battalion, Canadian Mounted Rifles, CEF
- Conflicts: World War I

William Stewart Wallace (23 June 1884 – 11 March 1970) was a Canadian historian, librarian, and editor. His historical reference works were considered "of inestimable value in Canadian studies." Canadian professor of political economy Harold Innis (1894–1952) was influenced by a maxim of the then McMaster University professor Wallace, "that the economic interpretation of history is not the only interpretation but is the deepest interpretation."

== Professional contributions ==
Wallace was educated at Toronto and Oxford (Master of Arts) universities, and taught history (1906 – 1920) at the universities of Western Ontario, McMaster and Toronto. In 1920 he became an assistant librarian, then in 1923, the librarian at the University of Toronto until his retirement in 1954 with title Chief Librarian.

Wallace wrote over thirty books and hundreds of articles. These works were not without its critics. Laura Secord is considered a heroine of the War of 1812, a war between the United States of America and Great Britain in Upper Canada (1812 – 1814). Wallace's 1932 study downplayed the importance of her contributions in that war and resulted in great debate: of those contributions, the emerging professional historian, and subsequent interpretive gender bias by historians. (Note: In The Encyclopedia of the War of 1812 as reviewed by Stickney, discusses Wallace's error and its occasional resurfacing in literature. Laura Secord's warning to the British resulted in an ambush of US military and their defeat at Beaver Dams on 24 June 1813. It was not until the 1960s that John Moir discovered two accounts from Lieutenant Fitzgibbon that proved Secord's claim of meeting prior to Fitzgibbon's Indian scouts being deployed and forewarning of the attack. This information was not found by Wallace in 1932. Source: Stickney (citation below).)

Wallace was the founder and first editor (1920 – 1930) of the Canadian Historical Review, editor (1923 – 1943), president (1943 – 1948), and honorary president (1963 – 1970) of the Champlain Society, honorary editor (1937 – 1945) of the Royal Society of Canada, and a long-standing member of the Bibliographical Society of Canada. He received the Royal Society of Canada's J. B. Tyrrell Historical Medal in 1936.

One of Wallace's long-term interests was the history of the famous North West Company and its partners, whose careers he investigated in minute detail. The "Biographical Dictionary of the Nor'Westers", published as part of his Documents Relating to the North West Company (1934), is full of evidence of the extensive correspondence he carried on with descendants of the partners, trying to locate new letters, journals and account books. Although articles in the Dictionary of Canadian Biography have expanded knowledge of some of the Company's partners, Wallace's work remains a fundamental source. One of his most important discoveries, near the end of his active career, was the correspondence of the Company's partner Æneas Cameron, then in the possession of descendants in Scotland and now at the Hudson's Bay Company Archives in Winnipeg. This collection of manuscripts was a key source for Elaine A. Mitchell's Fort Temiskaming and the Fur Trade (1977, University of Toronto Press).

=== Writings ===
Wallace was the author or editor of many noted printed materials, including:

- Review of historical publications relating to Canada (1908, Volume 12)
- The United Empire Loyalists: A chronicle of the Great Migration (1914)
- The Family Compact: A chronicle of the Rebellion in Upper Canada (1915), Glasgow, Brook, Toronto, 172 pages, relating to the small group of men exercising political, economic and judicial power in pre-confederation Ontario
- The Patriotes of '37: a chronicle of the Lower Canadian rebellion (1916), original written by Alfred D. Decelles (1843 – 1925), translated from French to English by Wallace
- The Maseres letters, 1766 – 1768 (1919), relating to the family of a judge and Attorney-General of the Province of Quebec
- By star and compass, tales of the explorers of Canada (1922)
- Sir John Macdonald (1924), first prime minister of Canada and Father of Confederation
- The dictionary of Canadian biography (1926). Revised edition (1945), Macmillan Company of Canada, 2 volumes.
- A history of the University of Toronto 1827-1927 (1927), The University of Toronto Press
- The growth of Canadian national feeling (1927), Macmillan Company of Canada, 85 pages
- A history of the Canadian people (1930)
- John Strachan (1930), Toronto bishop (1778 – 1867) and founder of the University of King's College (the predecessor to the University of Toronto)
- With sword and trowel: Select documents illustrating 'A first book of Canadian history' (1930)
- Murders and mysteries, a Canadian series (1931)
- The story of Laura Secord: A study in historical evidence (1932)
- The Memoirs of the Rt. Hon. Sir George Foster, P.C., G.C.M.G (1933)
- Documents relating to the North West Company (1934) Champlain Society Vol. 22. A valuable source of materials for the history of Canada's famous fur trading company. It prints a number of original documents, plus an original "Historical Introduction" and "A Biographical Dictionary of the Nor' Westers".
- A reader in Canadian civics (1935). The 1944 edition of 186 pages was authorised by the Minister of Education for Ontario (Note: It was noted in Wright (2005, p.91) that Wallace had a 'lucrative relationship' with the Ontario Department of Education and it was suggested 'he was prepared to walk away from the truth as he understood it to preserve' that relationship. As such, he submitted two books reviewed and subsequently approved for use in Ontario schools. Source: Wright (citation below).)
- Encyclopedia of Canada (1935 – 1937, six volumes), later forming the core of the Encyclopedia Canadiana (Note: Wallace's Encyclopedia of Canada (1935 – 1937) in six volumes became the core for the core of the 1957 Encyclopedia Canadiana. In 1985, The Canadian Encyclopedia was created.)
- Notes on military writing for English-Canadian soldiers (1943)
- A first book of Canadian history (1946)
- The Royal Canadian Institute Centennial Volume 1849-1949 (1949), The Royal Canadian Institute, Toronto
- A dictionary of North American authors deceased before 1950 (1951), Ryerson Press
- The pedlars from Quebec: And other papers on the Nor'Westers (1954), Ryerson Press, Toronto. Discourse including the Hudson's Bay Company and the North West Company
- The Ryerson imprint: A check-list of the books and pamphlets published by the Ryerson press since the foundation of the house in 1829 (1954)
- The Macmillan Dictionary of Canadian Biography (1963)
- Fur traders at Fort Temiskaming and Bear Island: Being the story Fort Timiskaming and the post on Bear Island, from the pedlars from Quebec (1972)

Joint work included:

- The Present State of Hudson's Bay Containing a Full Description of That Settlement, and the Adjacent Country, and Likewise of the Fur Trade, with Hints for Its Improvement, &c., &C. (1954). The Canadian Historical Studies, Ryerson Press, Toronto. Reprint of the original by Edward Umfreville (London, 1790); edited by W. Stewart Wallace

Some of the publications of or about Champlain Society by Wallace included:

- John McLean's notes of a twenty-five year's service in the Hudson's Bay Territory (1932), Champlain Society, Vol. XIX, Toronto.
- Documents relating to the North West Company (1934), The Publications of the Champlain Society, Vol. XXII, Toronto.
- A sketch of the history of the Champlain Society (1957)

== Private life ==
William George Wallace (b. c. 1858 Georgetown; a Presbyterian minister; son of Robert and Isabella Wallace) and Maggie Marie Stewart (b. c. 1861 Woodstock; daughter of William Boyd and Augusta A. (née Kilborn) Stewart) were married in Toronto, Ontario, Canada on Thursday, 28 June 1883. Stewart's Scottish-born father was a Baptist pastor and teacher in Ontario. William George Wallace was part of the officers of the inaugural general council in Toronto in June 1925 for the United Church.

Their son William Stewart Wallace was born on Monday, 23 June 1884 in Georgetown. Aged 29, on 24 October 1913 in Ontario, Wallace married Isabel Dora Graeme Robertson (b. 27 October 1883, Toronto), the daughter of James Alexander and Julia Delmage (née Carry) Robertson. They had two children.

During the First World War, he reached the rank of major in the Canadian Expeditionary Force (1915 – 1918), serving overseas, and involved in the Khaki College as the commanding officer.

He retired at seventy years of age and from 1954 was the proprietor of the well-known Dora Hood's Book Room booksellers. (Note: Dora Rideout Hood (1885 – 1974) was considered one of Canada's most notable booksellers. Born 1885, married Dr Frederick Hood in 1918, and after his death in 1927, she purchased a small mail order book business and worked from 730 Spadina Avenue, Toronto, Ontario, Canada. With specialties of Canadiana and Americana, catalogues were produced and the business grew, and she was a charter member of the Canadian Booksellers Association. In 1954, she sold the 'Book Room' to Wallace, now retired Chief Librarian at the University of Toronto. The business changed hands several more times before closing in 1982. Hood wrote of her experiences in The side door: Twenty six years in my Book Room, including stories and anecdotes about notable authors and collectors (1958). She died in 1974. Source: 'Dora Ridout Hood: Antiquarian bookseller' (citation below).) Wallace died on Wednesday, 11 March 1970 in Toronto and was buried at the Mount Pleasant Cemetery, Toronto, survived by his wife and children.

== See also ==
- Historiography of Canada
