= E. Harris Harbison =

Elmore Harris Harbison (1907–1964) was an American historian and scholar on the topic of Christianity and history. He was the Henry Charles Lea Professor of History at Princeton University and a trustee of the Princeton Theological Seminary.

== Personal life ==
E. Harris Harbison was born to Ralph Warner Harbison and Helen Mary Harris (the daughter of Elmore Harris of Toronto, Ontario) in 1907 in Sewickley, Pennsylvania. He married Janet German in 1937 and had a son, John Harris Harbison, a distinguished composer, and two daughters, Helen and Margaret. Helen was once engaged to Iranian-American scholar Ervand Abrahamian.

== Academic study ==
Harbison received his bachelor's in history from Princeton University in 1928 and was the valedictorian of his class. He continued on to Harvard University and in 1938 earned his doctorate for his dissertation Rival Ambassadors in the Court of Queen Mary. The dissertation later won an Adams Prize from the American Historical Association.

He joined Princeton as a faculty member in 1933 and became a trustee of the Princeton Theological Seminary in 1951. He served on several committees and boards dedicated to religious scholarly study

A national teaching award is named in his honor.

== Publications ==
=== Books ===
- Rival Ambassadors at the Court of Queen Mary (1940)
- The Age of Reformation (1955)
- The Christian Scholar in the Age of Reformation (1956)
- Christianity and History (1964)

=== Articles ===
- "The Meaning of History and the Writing of History." Church History. 2.21 (1952): 97-107
