= Toronto Baptist Seminary and Bible College =

Theological college in Toronto, Ontario

Coordinates: 43°39′38″N 79°22′31″W

- Motto: ΚΑΤΑ ΧΡΙΣΤΟΝ
- Motto in English: "According to Christ"
- Type: Theological college
- Established: 1927
- Affiliations: Baptist
- President: Dr. G.G. Thompson
- Principal: Rev. Kirk Wellum
- Academic staff: 13
- Location: Toronto, Guelph Extension Centres - Port Perry, Sarnia, ON, Canada
- Campus: Urban
- Vision: Theological education that transforms
- Colours: blue and White
- Website: www.tbs.edu

The Toronto Baptist Seminary and Bible College is a Reformed Baptist theological college in Toronto, Ontario, Canada. The seminary trains pastors for the Sovereign Grace Fellowship of Canada, the Fellowship of Evangelical Baptist Churches in Canada, and other Baptist churches in Canada and elsewhere.

== History ==
The school was founded in 1927 and is located adjacent to Jarvis Street Baptist Church. The school was proposed in 1925 by Dr. Thomas Todhunter Shields, editor of The Gospel Witness and pastor of the Jarvis Street Baptist Church, who was dismayed that modernism had taken hold in contemporary theological institutions; namely McMaster University (then located in Toronto), which provided training for Ontario and Quebec's Baptist ministers.

On December 23, 1926, The Gospel Witness announced that "Toronto Baptist Seminary, the new Baptist College rendered necessary by the inroads of Modernism, will open its classes on January 4, 1927, in the Seminary Building, 337 Jarvis Street, Toronto."

From that opening date, continuous classes of students have been trained in the Seminary except for a break of three years during World War II.

In 1948, the seminary split when over 50 students opposed to Shields' control left to form the Central Baptist Seminary under the leadership of W. Gordon Brown. Later the name was changed to Central Baptist Seminary which in 1993 merged with London Baptist Seminary to form Heritage Theological Seminary (see Heritage Baptist College and Heritage Theological Seminary). Today, Toronto Baptist Seminary affirms solidarity and cooperation with similar evangelical institutions.

In the post-war era, Toronto Baptist Seminary has hosted multiple generations of administrators, professors, and students passing through its facilities, notable among them, Michael A. G. Haykin, who was the principal from 2003 to 2007.

== Status ==
The seminary has conferred theological degrees since its inception. However, in 1982, the Ontario legislature officially recognized the seminary as a degree-granting institution through the passage of Bill PR 44. In 1985, the institution changed its name from Toronto Baptist Seminary to the Toronto Baptist Seminary and Bible College.

== Governance ==
The seminary is governed by a board of trustees, roughly half of which is made up of members and officials of the Jarvis Street Baptist Church, and a Senate composed of the faculty, school administrators and several trustees.
