= Sovereign Grace Fellowship of Canada =

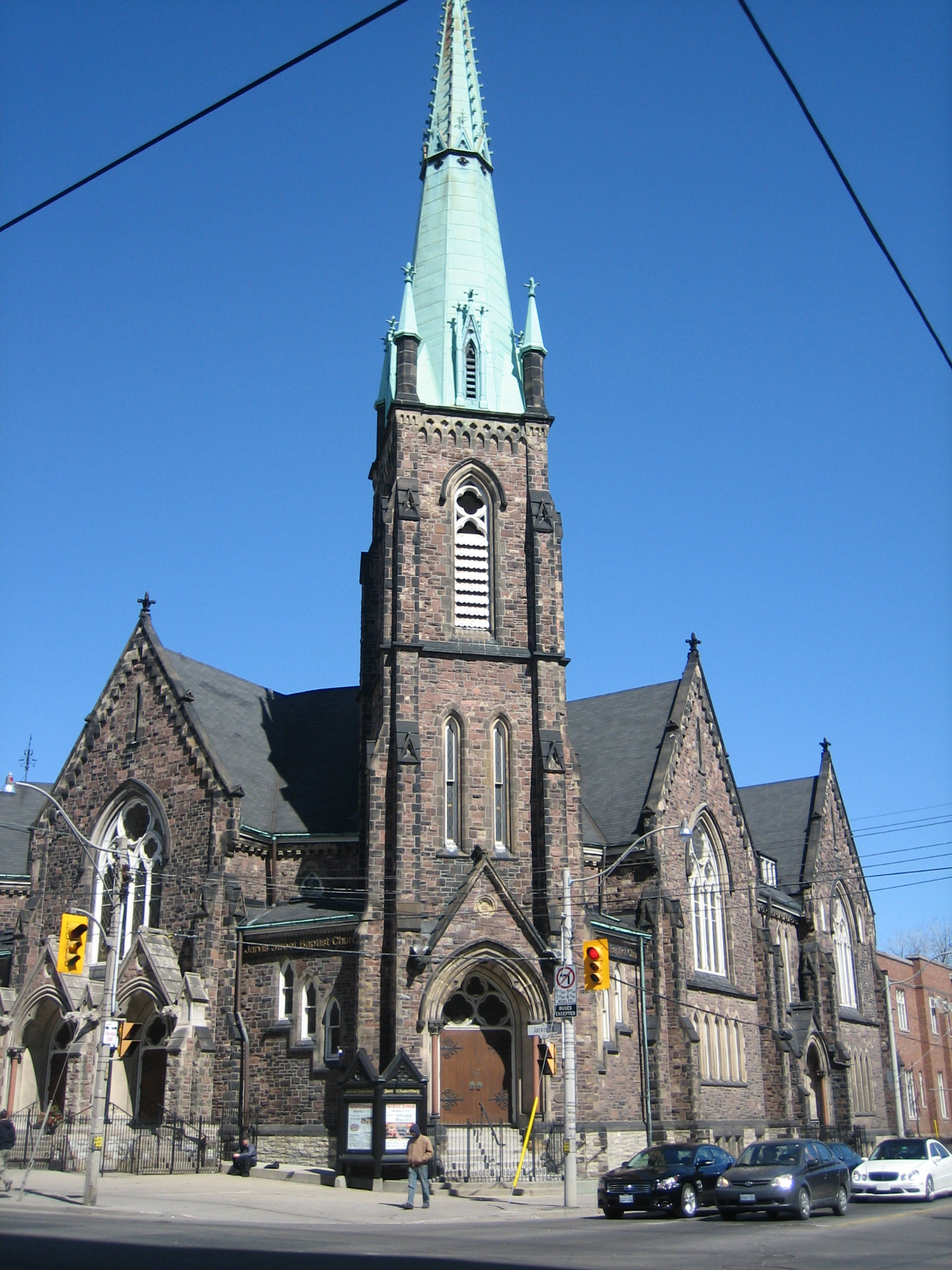
Jarvis Street Baptist Church in Toronto

Sovereign Grace Fellowship of Canada (SGF) is a fellowship for Reformed Baptist churches in Canada holding to either the Baptist Confessions of 1644 or 1689.

== History ==
The Fellowship was founded in 1983 by William Payne, pastor of Trinity Baptist Church in Burlington, Ontario.

In 2001, the Fellowship adopted a constitution. As of 2012, there were 14 churches, including the Jarvis Street Baptist Church in Toronto.

SGF publishes a magazine called Barnabas. It is one of the Baptist groups associated with the Toronto Baptist Seminary and Bible College.

== See also ==
- Baptists in Canada
- Sovereign Grace Baptists
