= Robert Alexander Fyfe =

Church Builder

Robert Alexander Fyfe

Robert Alexander Fyfe (October 20, 1816 – September 4, 1878) was a strong church builder, writer, and first Principal of the Canadian Literary Institute (later Woodstock College).

== Background ==
Fyfe was the son of James Fyfe a Scottish Immigrant from Dundee, Scotland. Fyfe's educational advantages were few, and he was obliged at an early age to work for his living. Fyfe married Jane Maclerie Thomson (1815–1847) in February 1843 at First Baptist Church, Montréal, Québec. Two sons were born who died in infancy. Fyfe remarried to Rebecca Smith Kendall (1815–1884) of Brookline, Massachusetts in August 1848. He was buried beside his first wife and children in the Toronto Necropolis.

== Education ==
Fyfe was determined to enter the ministry and in the fall of 1835 he entered into courses at Hamilton Literary and Theological Institution in Hamilton, New York (later Madison University then Colgate University). He applied himself so assiduously as to permanently injure his health leaving in April 1836. Commencing in the fall of 1836 Fyfe began studies at the newly formed Canada Baptist College in Montréal. Subsequently, for the 1837–1838 school year he renewed his studies at the Worcester Manual Labor High School in Worcester, Massachusetts in preparation for further theological studies. Beginning in October 1839 Fyfe commenced studies at Newton Theological Seminary Andover Newton Theological School in Newton, Massachusetts. On August 25, 1842, Fyfe was ordained at Brookline, Massachusetts. At some later date the degree of Doctor of Divinity, D.D. was conferred.

== Pastorates ==
During September 1842, Fyfe began a pastorate at First Baptist Church in Perth, Ontario helping it to be officially organized later that year. He served until the fall of 1843 when he became Principal of Canada Baptist College in Montréal for one year serving until the fall of 1844. Beginning in September 1844 until September 1848 Fyfe became the pastor of Bond Street Baptist Church in Toronto, Ontario. Fyfe did much to help bring cohesion and stability to the many divergent background variations of the immigrants who comprised the membership especially over the issue of close communion. Commencing in September 1848 Fyfe returned to Perth to take up the pastorate there again but left around October 1849. Shortly thereafter, upon invitation of the Baptist church in Warren, Rhode Island he preached and accepted the pastorate serving until June 1853. Beginning in November 1853 Fyfe served at the First Baptist Church in Milwaukee, Wisconsin until September 1855.

Commencing in October 1855 to 1860 Fyfe returned to pastor Bond Street Baptist Church. In 1860 he left to become the first principal at Woodstock College (then Canadian Literary Institute).

== Accomplishments ==
In 1859, with a friend, Fyfe had purchased the Christian Messenger (which had begun in 1854) a denominational paper published in Brantford, and made its place of publication Toronto, renaming it the Canadian Baptist in 1860. He provided outstanding editorship until 1863 Fyfe also wrote a book The Teaching of the New Testament In Regard To the Soul; And the Nature of Christ's Kingdom in 1859 which espoused the traditional amillennial view. Under Fyfe's leadership mission services were begun in the western part of Toronto. This mission eventually grew into the Beverley Street Baptist Church. At some point Fyfe also served on the board of the Upper Canada Religious Tract and Book Society (founded in 1832 in Toronto, Ontario).

Fyfe was a very articulate opponent of the system of the Clergy reserve. He was also a strong proponent of allowing more than one denomination to have schools of higher learning.

== Teaching ==
During the fall of 1843, he became Principal of Canada Baptist College in Montréal for one year serving until the fall of 1844. Commencing in 1860 until his death in 1878 Fyfe served as Principal of Woodstock College (then Canadian Literary Institute).

== Beliefs ==
Fyfe was Calvinistic but not of the strict sort. Fyfe was a firm believer in the stricter communion practice of close communion.

== Bibliography ==
- Robertson, John Ross, (1904). Landmarks of Toronto, Volume 4, pp 431–432.
- Rattray, W. J., (1880). The Scot in British North America v. 3, Toronto, Ontario: Maclear and Company.
- Wells, J. E., (1885). Life and Labours of Robert Alexander Fyfe, Toronto, Ontario: W. J. Gage & Company.
- Dent, John Charles, (1880). The Canadian Portrait Gallery vol. 2, Toronto, Ontario: John B. Magurn.
