= Thomas Todhunter Shields =

Leader of the fundamentalist Christian movement in Canada (1873–1955)

- Born: 1 November 1873; Bristol, Gloucester, England
- Died: 4 April 1955 (aged 81); Toronto, Ontario, Canada

Philosophical work
- School: Baptist, Calvinism, amillennialism

Thomas Todhunter Shields (1 November 1873 in Bristol, Gloucester, England – 4 April 1955 in Toronto, Ontario, Canada) was a leader of Fundamentalist Christianity in Canada. A self-educated immigrant from England, Shields was the longtime pastor of the Jarvis Street Baptist Church in Toronto. The Baptist denomination in Canada bore the brunt of that controversy and was centered at Jarvis St.

== Background ==
Thomas Todhunter Shields was the son of Thomas Todhunter Shields Sr., an Anglican minister and Maria Davis (m. 1865 in Swansea, Glamorganshire, Wales).

In 1881 his family was living in Blaenavon, near Pontypool, Wales his father being then a Primitive Methodist minister. The family emigrated to Canada around the year 1885 his father continuing to serve in the ministry in the Baptist denomination.

Thomas Todhunter Shields married Elizabeth A. Kitchen on 6 December 1899 in Delhi, Norfolk, Ontario (already then a minister).

== Education ==
Young Tod, as his father affectionately called him, never received a formal education beyond high school. Early in his ministry Shields proudly related that, as his pastor and theological professor, his father taught him "nearly all I have learned."

== Pastorates ==
T. T. Shields' delivered his first sermon in 1894 in Tiverton, Ontario and obtained his first pastorate in Florence, (Lambton) Ontario beginning in 1894. He had pastorates also in Dutton (Elgin) 1895, Delhi (Norfolk) 1897, and Hamilton (Wentworth Street Baptist Church) beginning in November, 1900. He moved to Adelaide Street Baptist Church in London in 1905, where he remained until 1910. Beginning in 1910 until his death in 1955 he served at Jarvis Street Baptist Church.

== Ministry ==
In a sense, Shields took up the mantle of orthodoxy that had been laid down by Elmore Harris in the Baptist denomination of the time. In a bit of irony, Shields (not knowing the full picture) was used by the Convention in 1910 to put forth a motion to quell the inquiry surrounding the professorship of Isaac George Matthews at McMaster University that Elmore Harris had begun. In 1917 Shields began a paper called The Searchlight which in 1927 was called The Fundamentalist. In the same year Shields was also granted an honorary Doctorate of Divinity from Temple University. In May 1918 Shields was given an honorary Doctor of Divinity degree at McMaster. In 1919, when an anonymous editorial in the Canadian Baptist attacked the doctrine of Biblical inerrancy, Shields presented a strong condemnatory resolution to the annual convention. Shields's strong motion passed. In 1920 Shields was elected to the Board of Governors at McMaster University. Shields and others were highly concerned that McMaster had conferred an honorary doctorate upon William H. P. Faunce (president of Brown University). Shortly after, Shields took action against McMaster University in Toronto for harboring the liberal theology professor Laurance Henry Marshall (from England) beginning in 1925 (served from 1925 to 1930) a self-confessed "liberal evangelical" who was appointed Professor of Practical Theology at McMaster. In the spring of 1926 Shields established Toronto Baptist Seminary and was censured by the Baptists convention of Ontario and Québec in 1926, and was expelled in 1927. He took with him 70 churches (representing about one seventh of the convention) and one college, and formed the Union of Regular Baptist Churches of Ontario and Quebec. It became affiliated with the Baptist Bible Union, based in the United States. His newspaper, The Gospel Witness, begun in 1922, reached 30,000 subscribers in 16 countries, giving him an international reputation. He was one of the founders of the International Council of Christian Churches. Shields championed British imperialism against liberal Protestantism and Roman Catholicism. Shields was also the longtime editor of The Gospel Witness. In 1930 he began evening church service broadcasts over the radio. At one point a radio station was purchased and given the call letters CJBC (Jarvis Street Baptist Church.) In difficult financial times this had to be sold, but the station still broadcasts as a CBC station.

Shields introduced many innovations. Of particular note was his move of the Sunday school to Sunday morning, something which had not yet been tried in Canada. Traditionally the Sunday School had been held in the afternoon. His efforts were successful and hereafter a Sunday morning crowd of children and adults gathered for Biblical instruction.

== Beliefs ==
Shields was a Calvinist and was unusual among fundamentalists in being an amillennialist. He strongly disliked dispensational premillennialism.

== Works ==
- The Most Famous Trial of History, or, The Trial of Jesus
- Christ in the Old Testament: How to Find Christ in Bible Study, and Other Sermons
- Revelations of the war: eight sermons preached on successive Sunday evenings, 17th January to 7th March 1915, in Jarvis Street Baptist Church, Toronto, Canada
- Russellism or Rutherfordism: The Teachings of "the International Bible Students," Alias "Jehovah's Witnesses" In the Light of the Holy Scriptures
