= Alexander Street Baptist Church =

Baptist church in Toronto, Canada

Coordinates: 43°39′47″N 79°22′54.5″W

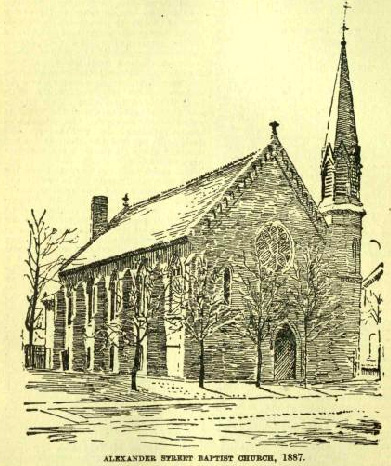
Alexander Street Baptist Church in 1887

Alexander Street Baptist Church was a Baptist church in Toronto, Ontario, Canada located on the south side of Alexander Street between Yonge and Church streets. The congregation was founded in 1866 and the church building, designed by Henry Langley, was completed the following year. When the congregation relocated in 1888, it was sold to the Anglican Church and eventually demolished in the mid-1950s.

== History ==
Alexander Street Baptist Church was founded October 23, 1866 by 27 members from Bond Street Baptist Church. Alexander Street was the first congregation of what was to be many Baptist congregations formed in the next 40–50 years within Toronto from the original Bond Street congregation. The church building, designed in the Gothic Revival style by the architectural firm of Thomas Gundry and Henry Langley, was opened March 24, 1867 and seated 480 people. The $10,500 cost of its construction was largely met by a donation from Thomas Lailey who owned a wholesale clothing business in Toronto. Lailey was also a major contributor to the church's running expenses over the years.

George McNutt (1867) was the first pastor of Alexander Street Baptist Church. (Hoyes Lloyd the editor of the Canadian Baptist since 1863 had been the interim pastor in 1866 and was formerly from Port Hope, Ontario). Andrew Heber Munro became its second pastor in 1869 and remained in his post for seven years, leaving to take over the pastorship of the First Baptist Church in Montreal. Following Munro's departure, the church was without a pastor for year until the arrival of his successor, Joshua Denovan (1829-1901) in 1878 who served until 1893 after the congregation had relocated (he resigned briefly due to health from 1888 to 1892 and W. H. Cline served in the interim). According to John Ross Robertson writing in Landmarks of Toronto:

The coming of Mr. Denovan at once infused new life into the church, and it reconstructed itself and entered upon a career of remarkable activity and, in one sense, has done a work that no other church in this city has accomplished. The Alexander street church occupies a unique position on the mission work, and has gained for itself a most enviable reputation in this respect. With a spirit of self-sacrifice, distinctively Christian and yet exceptional among churches, it has given away one dollar for missions for every dollar spent for its own upbuilding. In other Baptist churches $13 is used for the home church to $1 for missions, and in others $7 to $1.

The church sponsored a mission school outreach at Dovercourt Road Baptist Church which began in 1879 and organized as a congregation in April 1881. A building was eventually opened for use in September 1889 at the north-west corner of Dovercourt road and Argyle street. An outreach was also begun at 148 Tecumseth Street south (west of Queen and Bathurst streets) (also called Memorial Baptist Church), which is today occupied by the Ukrainian Baptist Church congregation.

In 1888 the Alexander Street congregation experienced growth and decided to relocate and build a new church at Jarvis and Wellesley Streets. The new church building opened in 1889 and was renamed Immanuel Baptist Church. The Alexander Street church building was sold to the Anglican Church and was used as the Toronto Church School until 1904 when the school merged with the St. Alban's School. Eaton's acquired the building and leased it to a succession of businesses, with its final use being storage for Eaton's. The church was demolished in 1954 when the south side of Alexander Street was razed to make way for the City Park apartment complex.

== Sources ==
- Cathcart, William (1881). The Baptist Encyclopedia. Vol. 2. Philadelphia: Louis H. Everts.
- Robertson, John Ross (1904). Landmarks of Toronto. Vol. Fourth series. Toronto: J. Ross Robertson. Republished from the Toronto Evening Telegram.
