= Moulton College (Toronto) =

- Moulton College, Toronto, Ontario, approximately 1909

Location
- 88 Bloor Street East; Toronto, Ontario; Canada; 43.6708°N 79.3852°W

Information
- Funding type: Private
- Religious affiliation: Baptist Convention of Ontario and Quebec
- Denomination: Baptist
- Established: 1888
- Founder: Susan Moulton McMaster
- Status: Closed
- Sister school: Woodstock College

Moulton College was a private girls' school in Toronto, Canada which was part of McMaster University. The school's curriculum was designed to prepare young women for their lives as wives and mothers, although it also offered a matriculation course for women who wanted to attend the University of Toronto or McMaster University.

Founded in 1888, Moulton College was located in the former home of Senator William McMaster and Susan Moulton McMaster on Bloor Street East. The school was affiliated with the Baptist Convention of Ontario and Quebec.

After decades of financial difficulty, McMaster University closed the school in 1954 and sold the buildings.

== History ==
Moulton College began its life as part of Woodstock College, a Baptist college in Woodstock, Ontario. Woodstock, originally known as the Canadian Literary Institute, began to allow women to study in 1860. In 1887, with an endowment from William McMaster, the theology department of Woodstock College and Toronto Baptist College merged to create McMaster University. Woodstock College continued to operate as a college until McMaster closed the school in July 1926. McMaster died in September 1887, one month prior to the McMaster University's charter becoming active.

McMaster's widow, Susan Moulton McMaster, shared her husband's passion for education, particularly for the education of young women. In his will, McMaster provided not only a handsome sum for McMaster University, but also for his wife and provided her exclusive use of the couple's Bloor Street Mansion for the remainder of her life. After several unsuccessful attempts to sell the mansion, Susan conveyed the residence to McMaster University for the purpose of establishing a preparatory school for girls. The Ladies' Department of Woodstock College transferred control of its Ladies' Department to McMaster, and the mansion was reopened as Moulton Ladies' College in 1888.

In 1954, McMaster University closed the school and sold the buildings. The buildings were demolished in 1958.
