= Trinity United Church (Peterborough, Ontario) =

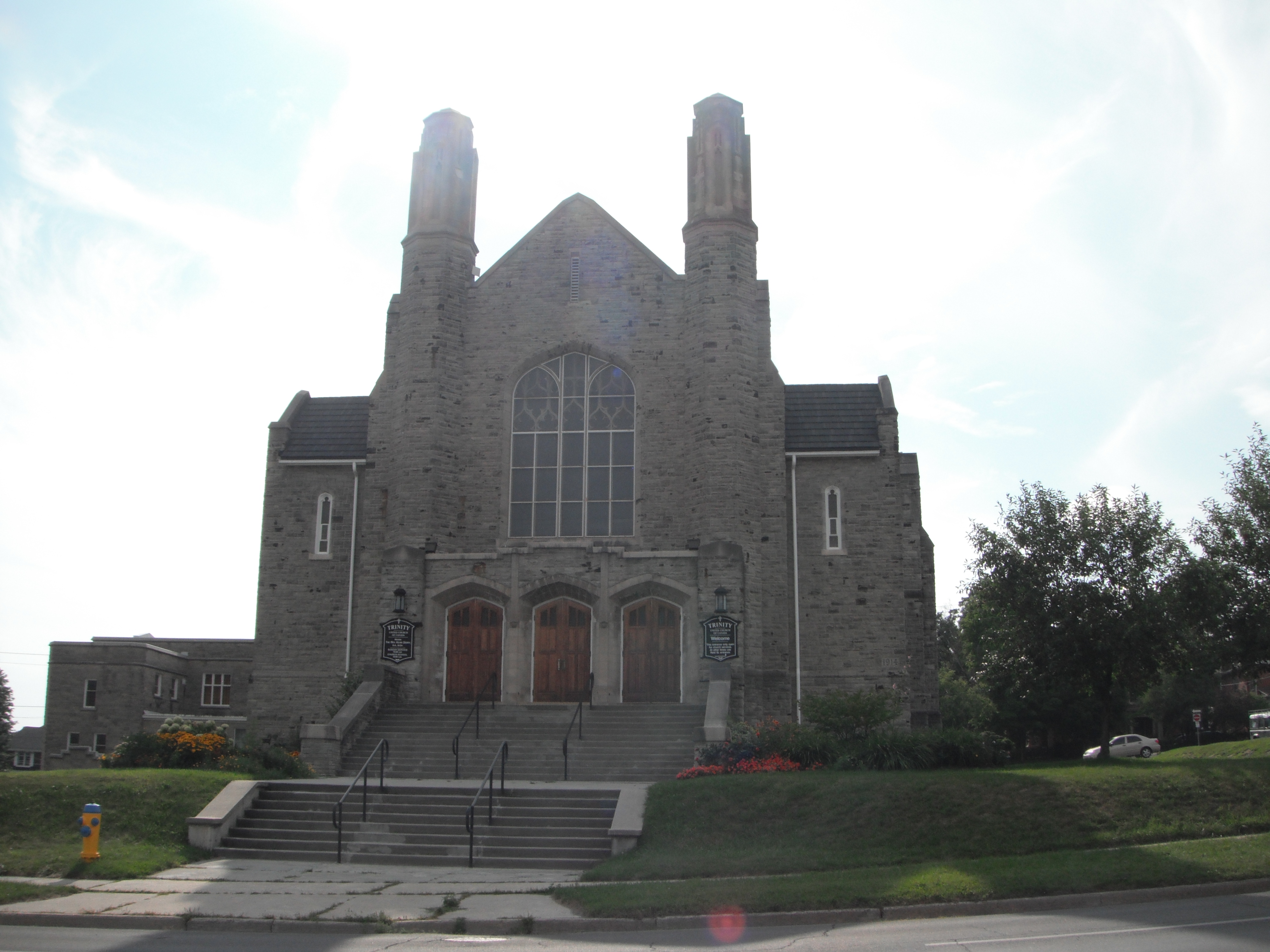
- Trinity United Church in 2010
- Trinity United Church
- 44°18′15″N 78°19′40″W
- Location: Peterborough, Ontario, Canada
- Denomination: United Church of Canada
- Previous denomination: Methodist

History
- Former name: Trinity Methodist Church (1914–1925)

Architecture
- Architect: Edmund Burke
- Style: Gothic Revival
- Groundbreaking: 1914
- Completed: 1916
- Closed: 2022

Trinity United Church was a church located in downtown Peterborough, Ontario, Canada. Originally Methodist, from 1925, the church belonged to the United Church of Canada. The church was built between 1914 and 1916 in the Gothic Revival style by Edmund Burke. The church closed and the congregation disbanded on 12 June 2022.

== History ==
The congregation was formed in 1872 as Charlotte Street Wesleyan Methodist Church. When a number of smaller Methodist denominations merged to form the Methodist Church in 1884, it became Charlotte Street Methodist Church. The church was located in a Gothic Revival building designed by John E. Belcher at the corner of Charlotte and Reid Streets. By the turn of the 20th century, they had outgrown these premises and the lot for the present church was given by the family of Senator George A. Cox. Cox attended Charlotte Street Methodist when he lived in Peterborough.

The cornerstone of the new church was laid by Cox's son, Herbert Coplin Cox, on 24 September 1914. The church was built by local contractor, William Langford. It was built with a seating capacity of 900. The Rev. Dr. Samuel Dwight Chown, Superintendent of the Methodist Church, formally dedicated the new Trinity Methodist Church on 2 January 1916. In 1925, when the United Church of Canada was formed, Trinity Methodist Church became Trinity United Church.

The church reached its peak in the 1960s with 1,200 people attending services each Sunday.

Faced with dwindling congregation and rising repair costs in the early 21st century, in April 2019, a motion to merge with Emmanuel United Church was defeated. On 24 June 2021, it was announced that the congregation had voted to close the church and disband due to a dwindling congregation and rising repairs costs. The church held its last service and closed on 12 June 2022.

== Architecture ==
Trinity was constructed between 1914 and 1916 in the Gothic Revival style by architect Edmund Burke. It is of light grey Credit Valley sandstone construction with Indiana limestone trimmings. The church forms a terminating vista at the head of Simcoe Street.
