= Saint Luke's United Church =

Coordinates: 43.663048°N 79.372648°W

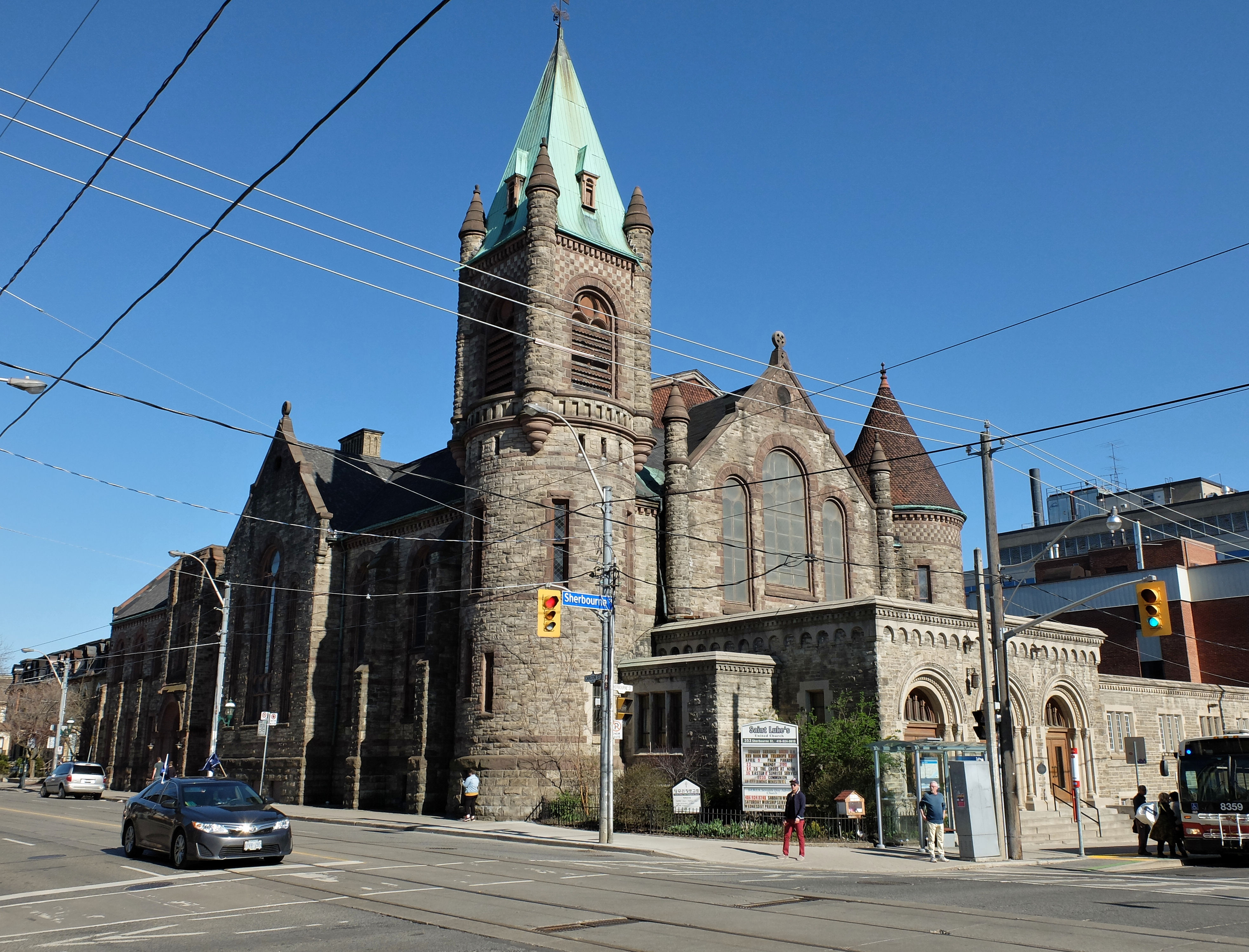
- Saint Luke's United Church
- Location: 353 Sherbourne Street; Toronto, Ontario
- Country: Canada
- Denomination: United Church of Canada
- Previous denomination: Methodist Church
- Website: saintlukesunitedchurch.com

History
- Former name(s): Sherbourne Street Methodist Church (1887–1925); Sherbourne Street United Church (1925–1959)
- Founded: 1871

Architecture
- Architect(s): Langley & Burke
- Style: Richardsonian Romanesque
- Years built: 1887

Clergy
- Pastor: The Rev. Jim Harbell

Saint Luke's United Church is a historic United Church of Canada church at 353 Sherbourne Street in the Cabbagetown neighbourhood of Toronto, Ontario, Canada.

The church was built in 1887 in the Richardsonian Romanesque style to designs by the prominent Toronto architectural firm of Langley & Burke. Originally known as Sherbourne Street Methodist Church, its congregation had been established in 1872 and became part of the newly formed United Church of Canada in 1925. In 1959, Sherbourne Street United Church merged with Carlton Street United Church, a congregation founded in 1832, to form Saint Luke's United Church.

== History ==
Sherbourne Street Methodist Church from Toronto, Old and New (1891)

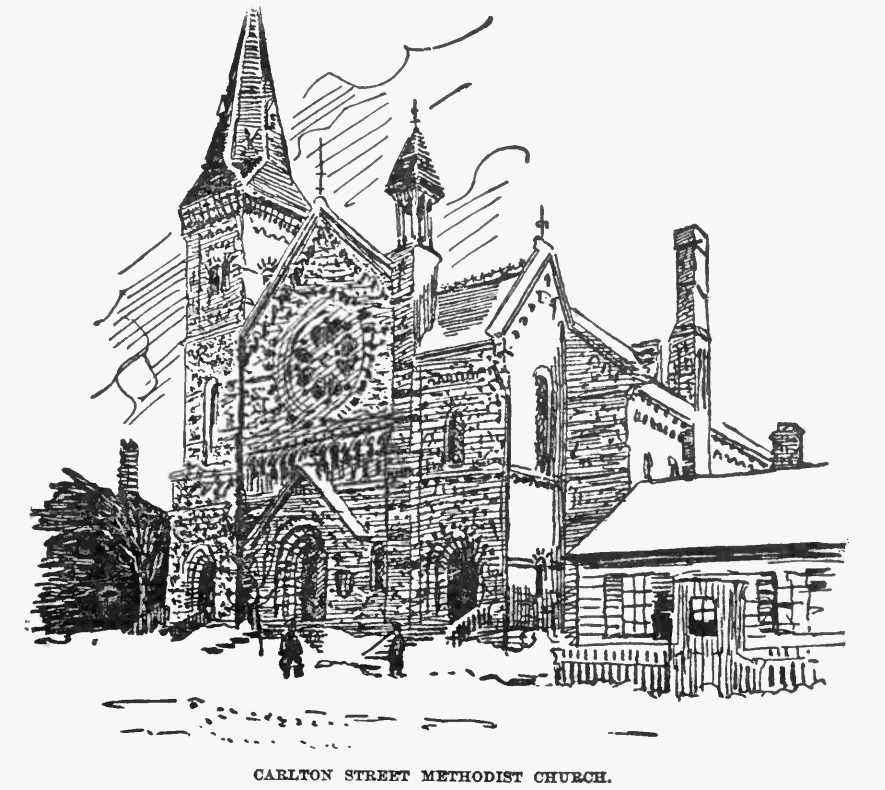
Carlton Street Methodist Church from Landmarks of Toronto (1904)

The congregation was founded in 1871 as Carleton Street Wesleyan Methodist Church. Its first church building, designed by architect James Avon Smith, was completed the following year. The congregation soon outgrew the building, which was demolished in 1886.

The present church was completed in 1887 in the Richardsonian Romanesque style to designs by prominent Toronto architect Henry Langley and his nephew, Edmund Burke. Construction cost an estimated $76,000, and the church had a seating capacity of 1,200. Langley & Burke designed a Sunday school wing, constructed to the northeast of the church in 1912. A narthex was added to the Sherbourne Street façade in 1929 to designs by the firm of Wickson & Gregg, followed in 1962 by a gymnasium to the south, designed by Toronto architects Parrott, Tambling and Witmer.

In the late 19th and early 20th centuries, Sherbourne Street Methodist Church was known as the "millionaires' church", reflecting the concentration of wealthy and prominent Toronto families who lived in stately homes along Sherbourne Street. Notable members of the congregation during this period included Sir Joseph Flavelle, Sir Albert Edward Kemp, George Albertus Cox, and Alfred Ernest Ames.

In 1925, the congregation joined the newly formed United Church of Canada and became known as Sherbounre Street United Church. The church merged with the nearby Carlton Street United Church in 1959 and adopted the name Saint Luke's United Church.

The Carlton Street United Church congregation was founded in 1832 as Bay Street Primitive Methodist Church. In 1854, the congregation relocated to Alice Street, where it remained until the church was destroyed by fire in 1874. The following year, the congregation moved to a new church on Carlton Street, east of Yonge Street, designed by architect William George Storm. Like the Sherbourne Street church, in 1925, the congregation joined the newly formed United Church became known as Carlton Street United Church.

The church has been included on the City of Toronto's Heritage Register since 1976. It has been designated under Part V of the Ontario Heritage Act as a feature of the Cabbagetown Northwest Heritage Conservation District since 2008.

== Community use ==
In addition to serving the St. Luke's congregation, the church has historically functioned as a community centre, with its sanctuary, chapel, meeting rooms, kitchens and gymnasium used by a variety of religious and community organizations. The building has hosted concerts and rehearsals, dance and theatre groups, social service programs, food banks and recreational activities.

== Redevelopment ==
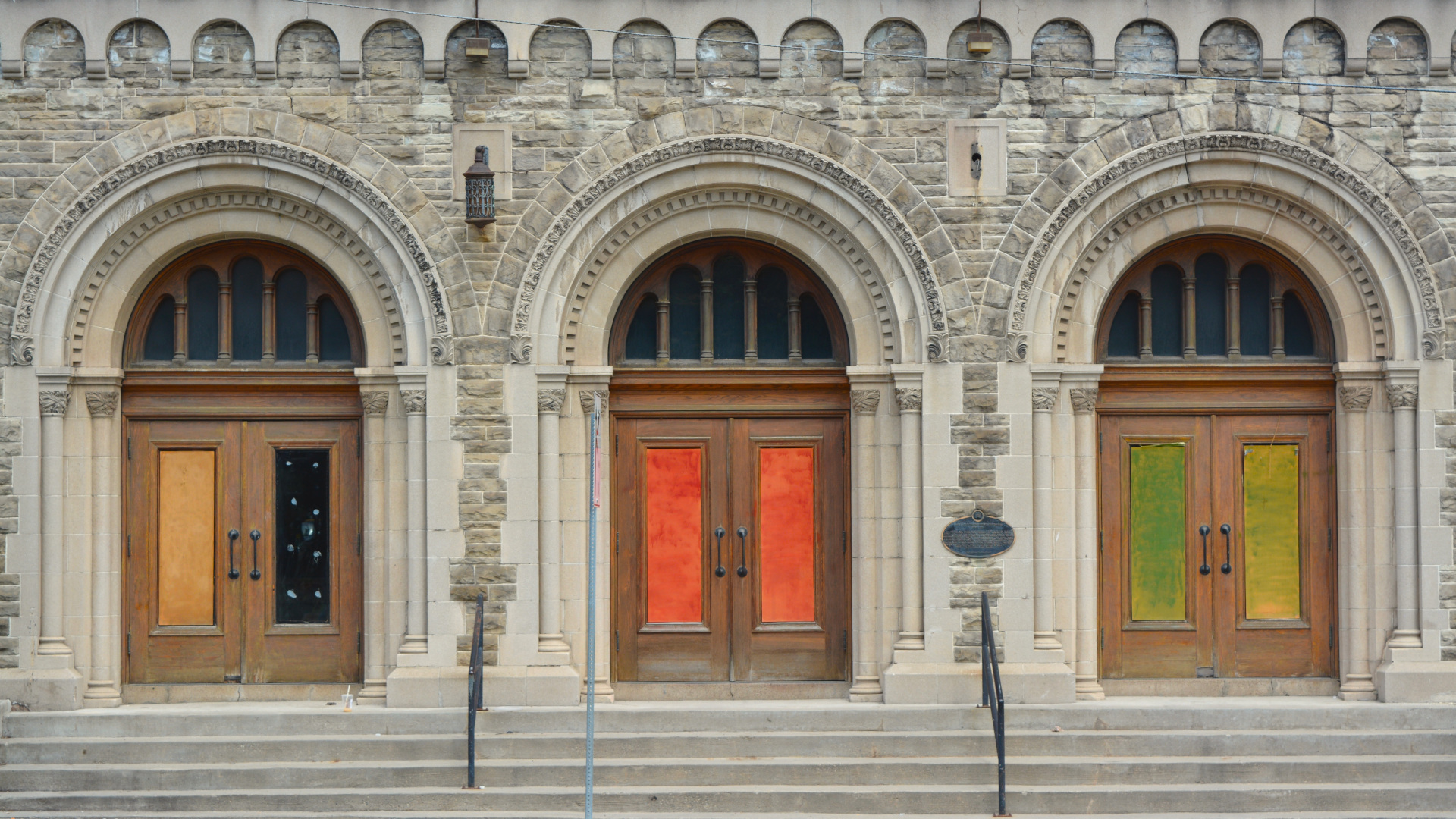
The 1929 narthex

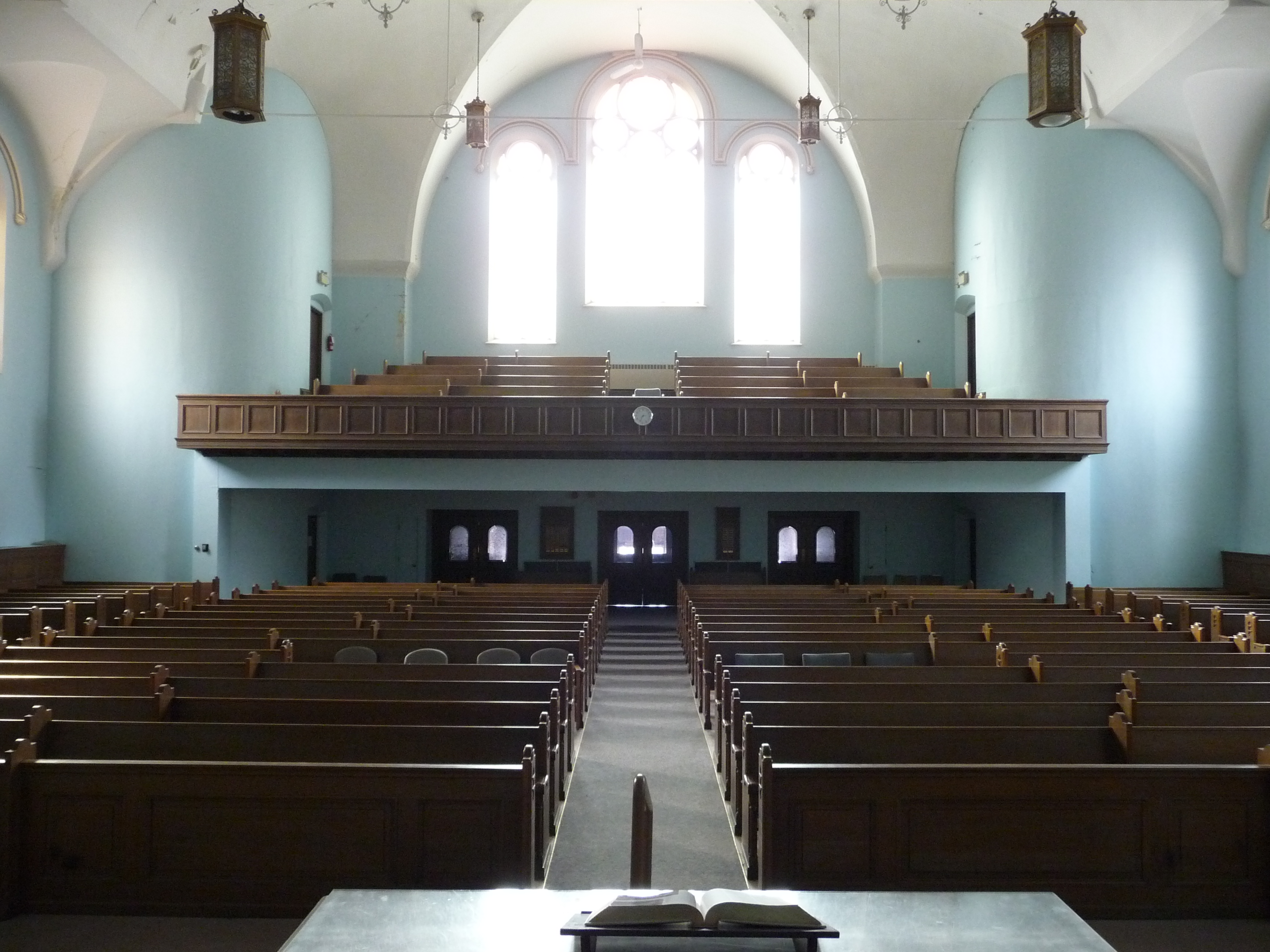
The sanctuary

In 2021, Saint Luke's entered into a partnership with the United Property Resource Corporation (UPRC), later operating as Kindred Works, to redevelop the church property as part of a wider initiative to develop housing on underutilized United Church of Canada properties. The project was designed by KPMB Architects, with ERA Architects serving as heritage consultants.

An initial redevelopment proposal called for the construction of a 12-storey mixed-use building containing 100 rental units, of which approximately 30 per cent would be affordable housing, together with new community facilities. The proposal retained the principal 1887 church building and most of the 1912 Sunday school addition, while calling for the demolition of the 1929 narthex, the 1962 gymnasium and portions of the Sunday school. Toronto City Council approved the necessary planning and heritage applications in 2022.

The project was subsequently redesigned and substantially increased in scale. A revised proposal submitted in 2025 called for a 48-storey mixed-use tower and four-storey podium containing approximately 440 residential units, with a minimum of 30 per cent designated as affordable housing. The heritage church would be retained and adaptively reused, incorporating a residential lobby and 1,453 m^{2} (15,640 sq ft) of community space. The development also includes improvements to the public realm along Sherbourne Street, including a minimum 250 m^{2} (2,700 sq ft) privately owned publicly accessible space.

The revised proposal continued the earlier heritage conservation strategy, including removal of the narthex, gymnasium and portions of the Sunday school building. In January 2026, the Toronto Preservation Board recommended that City Council refuse the proposed alterations to the heritage property. City Council nevertheless approved the alterations, along with the required Official Plan and zoning amendments, on 4 February 2026. The heritage approval requires the property to be subject to a conservation plan and a heritage easement agreement with the city.

== See also ==
- List of United Church of Canada churches in Toronto
