= Susan Moulton McMaster =

Education philanthropist

- Born: Susan Moulton; 10 September 1819; Glenville, Connecticut
- Died: 27 August 1916 (aged 96); Montreal, Quebec
- Spouses: James Fraser (m. 1816–1866); William McMaster (m. 1871–1887)
- Children: 2

Susan McMaster (10 September 1819 – 27 August 1916) was the founder of Moulton Ladies' College and the wife of Canadian senator and founder of McMaster University, William McMaster. A devout Christian and supporter of girls' education, she sought to inspire young girls to be devout Christians and exert a strong influence on their communities through their work as homemakers and community service.

In 1888, McMaster founded Moulton Ladies' College, a private girls' school in Toronto, Ontario.

== Biography ==
Susan Moulton was born 10 September 1819 in Glenville, Connecticut and was baptized as a Baptist at a young age. She was educated at local schools before attending Ipswich Seminary. At Ipswich, Moulton studied under Mary Lyon, founder of Mount Holyoke Female Seminary, then assistant principal at Ipswich. This relationship proved to be influential for Moulton as she found Lyon's vision of Christian education for young women appealing.

In 1850, Moulton married James Fraser, an Indian Paymaster for the United States government at Saginaw, Michigan. Moulton regularly travelled with Fraser between Detroit and Saginaw. The couple had two children, one of whom died in infancy. Fraser died in 1866. Following Fraser's death, Moulton relocated to Newburgh, New York.

Moulton married a second time in 1871 to William McMaster and moved with him to Toronto. McMaster, although having limited formal education, strongly supported the creation of Baptist education institutions. Moulton shared this desire and pressed McMaster to turn one of the family's homes in Toronto, "Rathnally," into a college for Baptist theological studies. The transformation of Rathnally into a college never occurred, as in 1887 McMaster founded McMaster University which incorporated the theological department of Woodstock College (formally the Canadian Literary Institute), a Baptist secondary school.

McMaster died in September 1887, and left a generous endowment for McMaster University. He also willed Moulton control of the family's Bloor Street Mansion for the remainder of her life. After several failed attempts to sell the home, Moulton opted to transform the home into a Baptist girls secondary school that would be operated under the auspices of McMaster University. The college was named Moulton Ladies' College in her honor. The ladies department of Woodstock College was transferred to the college and Woodstock continued to operate as a male only institution until its closure in 1926.

Moulton College's curriculum was heavily informed by Moulton's experience at Ipswich, her Baptist faith, and belief in a well-rounded and practical curriculum. The Bible was used a textbook and girl's education included courses on homemaking and needlework. Students also received instruction in English, Moderns (French and German), Classics (Latin and Greek), Mathematics, Natural Science, Music, Drawing, Commercial Work, History, Logic and Psychology, and in the fourth year Ethics, Civil Polity, and Applied Chemistry. A three-year matriculation course was also offered for students desiring to attend McMaster University or the University of Toronto.

Moulton travelled to the college regularly to meet with students during the college's formative decades and encourage them in their studies, although her visits became less frequent as she aged.

She died at her daughter's home in Montreal on 27 August 1916 and is buried in Mount Royal Cemetery, in Montreal.
