= British Colonial Building =

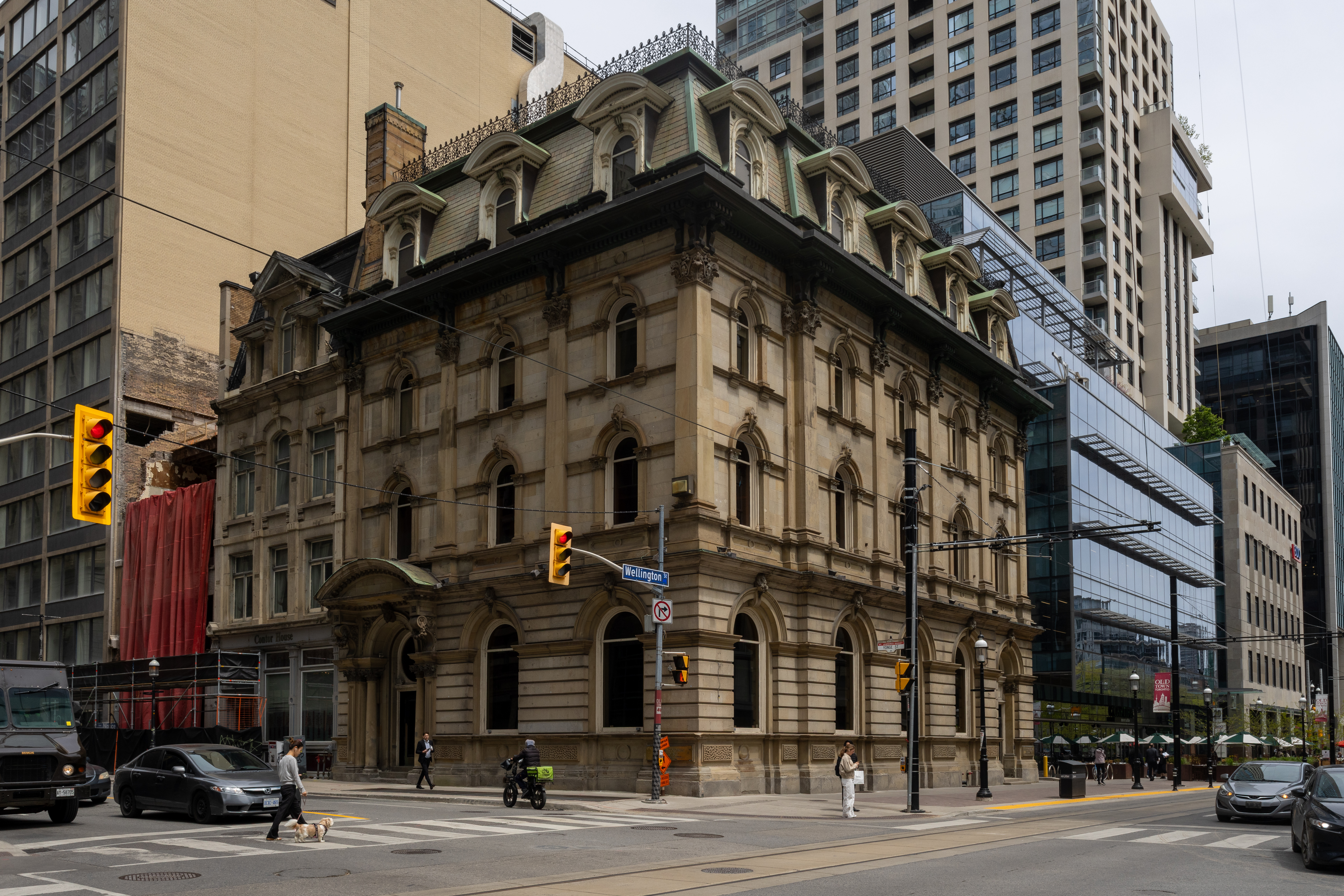
- The building shown in 2026
- Interactive map of the British Colonial Building area

General information
- Architectural style: Second Empire
- Location: 49 Yonge Street, Toronto
- Coordinates: 43°38′53″N 79°22′38″W
- Year built: 1875
- Renovated: 1903
- Owner: Bank of British North America/Bank of Montreal (original owners)

Technical details
- Material: Stone pilasters, rusticated stone on the first floor, carved stone windows, iron cresting on mansard roof

Design and construction
- Architects: Henry Langley (1875), Burke and Horwood (1903 modifications)

Ontario Heritage Act
- Official name: 49 Yonge Street
- Designated: 1979

The British Colonial Building is a preserved former bank building, located at 49 Yonge Street, in Toronto, Canada. The building was designated under Part IV of the Ontario Heritage Act in 1979.

== Heritage details ==
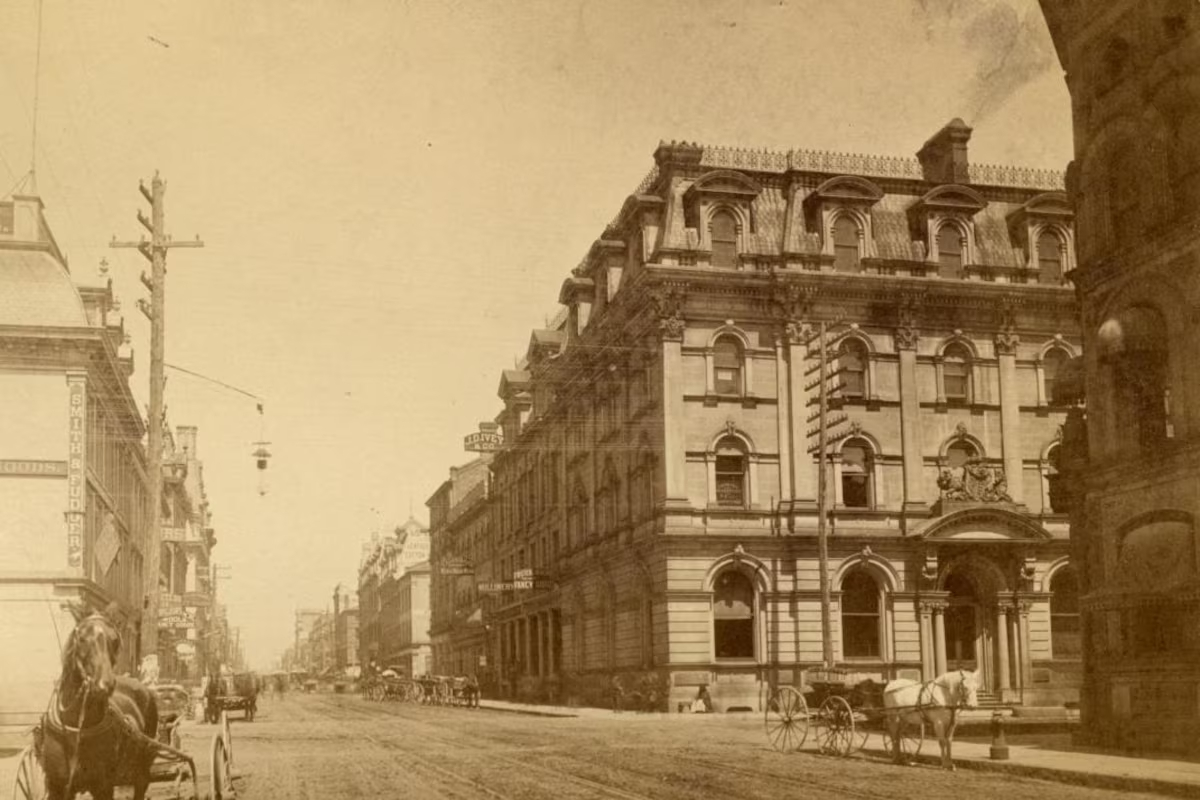
The building shown in 1890, to the right of the image.

Designed by Henry Langley, was built to house the Bank of British North America, at the corner of Yonge and Wellington streets in Toronto. The three-storey building “housed a grand marble banking hall on the bottom floor and comfortable living space for the bank manager on top”. Designed by Langley in the Second Empire style, he used gold-coloured Ohio stone for the exterior, making it stand out from the other “ubiquitous” red brick buildings in the city. Constructed at the start of a wave of Second Empire design craze in Toronto, the building was noted for its mosaic floors and arching interior columns. It is one of the few buildings from the period that was not demolished in the area; between 1955 and 1975 several of Toronto’s oldest buildings were torn down to “modernize” the downtown core.

The Bank of British North America was later folded into the Bank of Montreal and this building was for a time a branch of the Bank of Montreal, later a Bank of Commerce branch. In 1982, it was restored Greymac Trust, which then sold it to Household Finance, then to Calloway REIT. It later housed an Irish pub, opening on St. Patrick’s Day 2001. There were plans to transform the site into a 60-storey multi-use tower consisted of condos and commercial offices in 2022,; as of 2026, this has not happened.

The City of Toronto designated the building under Part IV of the Ontario Heritage Act in 1979; the designation notes: “The property at No. 49 Yonge Street is designated on architectural grounds. Originally the Bank of British North America, it was built in 1875 and was designed by Henry Langley in a flamboyant Second Empire style. Alterations in 1903 by Burke and Horwood retained the important architectural features which include the mansard roof with its exquisite iron cresting, elaborate arched dormers and a bold bracketed entablature. Stone pilasters with Corinthian capitals rise from the rusticated stone of the first storey. All windows are arched and finely detailed in stone with carved keystones and pilaster trim. The richly carved Yonge Street entrance with bracketed pediment and keystone face is one of the finest in the City. Important interior features are the white marble detailing of the banking room with central columns and high vaulted ceiling.”
