= Grace Toronto Church =

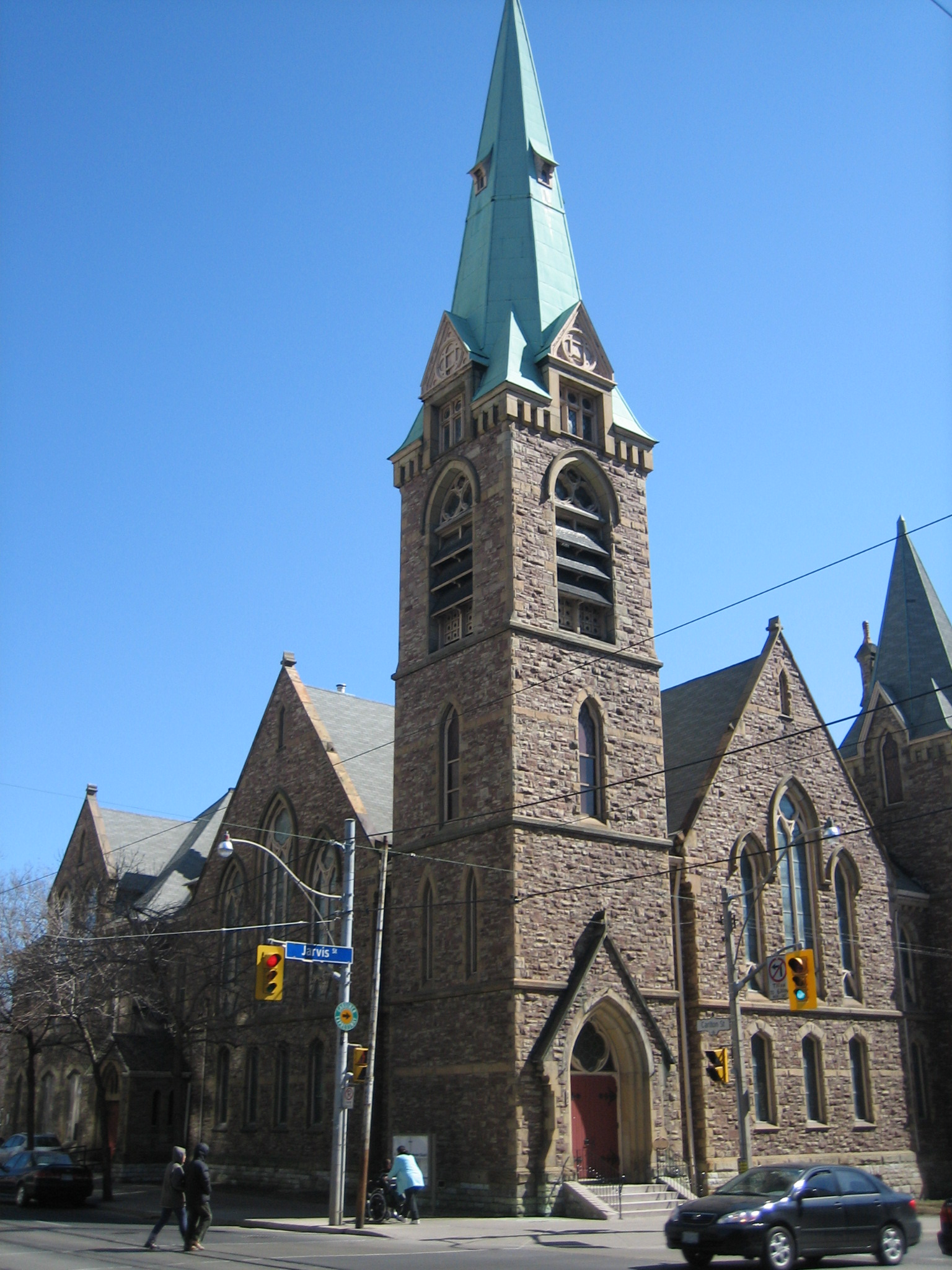
- Grace Toronto Church
- 43.662276°N 79.376269°W
- Location: 383 Jarvis Street, Toronto, Ontario
- Denomination: Presbyterian Church in America
- Website: gracetoronto.ca

Architecture
- Architect(s): Henry Langley, Edmund Burke, Edward Langley
- Style: Gothic Revival
- Completed: 1878; 148 years ago

Grace Toronto Church is a Presbyterian Church in America congregation in the historic Old St. Andrew's Church building at 383 Jarvis Street, in the Garden District, in Toronto, Ontario, Canada.
