= Susan Quaggin =

Canadian nephrologist

- Education: University of Toronto Faculty of Medicine; Northwestern University Feinberg School of Medicine
- Awards: Carl W. Gottschalk Research Scholar Award; Joe Doupe Young Investigator Award
- Scientific career
- Fields: Nephrology, hypertension

Susan E. Quaggin is a Canadian nephrologist. She is the Charles Horace Mayo Professor of Medicine at Northwestern University Feinberg School of Medicine, Director of the Feinberg Cardiovascular Research Institute, prior chief of the Division of Nephrology, now Chair of the Department of Medicine.

== Early life and education ==
Quaggin attended Branksome Hall, where she met her future husband Kevin Smith who attended Royal St. George's College. She attended the University of Toronto Faculty of Medicine, where she received the Carl W. Gottschalk Research Scholar Award from the American Society of Nephrology, and completed her post-doctoral fellowship at the Yale School of Medicine. In 1997, Quaggin returned to Toronto to study developmental biology with Janet Rossant at the Lunenfeld Institute of Mount Sinai Hospital. It was during her lab research with Rossant that she discovered a gene critical for the development of the kidneys, heart and lungs. By 2000, Quaggin and her research team were cloning mice lacking that vital gene in order to study their kidneys. The next year, she received the Joe Doupe Young Investigator Award.

== Career ==
Quaggin accepted a faculty position at the University of Toronto, where she spent 13 years as a senior scientist at the Samuel Lunenfeld Research Institute, a nephrologist at St. Michael's Hospital, and the Gabor-Zellerman Professor in renal medicine. In 2006, she was named a Tier 2 Canada Research Chair in Vascular Biology, which granted her $500,000 over 5 years. Two years later, Quaggin and Laura Barison discovered that VEGF inhibitors, an antibody used to treat many forms of cancer, was causing renal failure. She was also elected chair for the Abstract Selection Committees for Glomerular Disease with the American Society of Nephrology. The next year, Quaggin was the recipient of the 2009 KFOC Medal for Research Excellence by the Kidney Foundation of Canada.

In 2011, Quaggin was appointed the Gabor-Zellerman Chair in Renal Research in the Department of Medicine at the University of Toronto and Deputy Editor and for Journal of the American Society of Nephrology. Quaggin also co-published a study in the journal Cell regarding the effects of VEGF in the kidney, including how it will impact drug therapies and treatment. In 2012, Quaggin was encouraged to join the faculty at Northwestern University by Eric G. Neilson. She was eventually appointed the Charles Horace Mayo Professor of Medicine at Northwestern University Feinberg School of Medicine, and as Director of the Feinberg Cardiovascular Research Institute and chief of the Division of Nephrology.

At the Northwestern University Feinberg School of Medicine, Quaggin and Amani Fawzi discovered a cause of glaucoma in animals and began developing an eye drop aimed at curing the disease. Together with her PhD student Ben Thomson, Quaggin developed one of the first models of animals with the glaucoma disease. In May 2013, she was elected to the Association of American Physicians. She also received the Alfred Newton Richards Award for basic science research in the field by the International Society of Nephrology. Eventually, Q BioMed Inc. gained the rights to acquire Mannin Research Inc., which was developing the eyedrops.

In 2015, she was appointed the American Society of Nephrology's Councilor until 2022, sat on their Public Policy Board, and their and Blood and Lymphatic Development of the Kidney Board. In 2019, she was elected to the National Academy of Medicine.

In 2023, she became the first woman Chair of the Department of Medicine at the Northwestern University Feinberg School of Medicine.
