= Necropolis Chapel =

Church in Toronto, Canada

Coordinates: 43.6676°N 79.36162°W

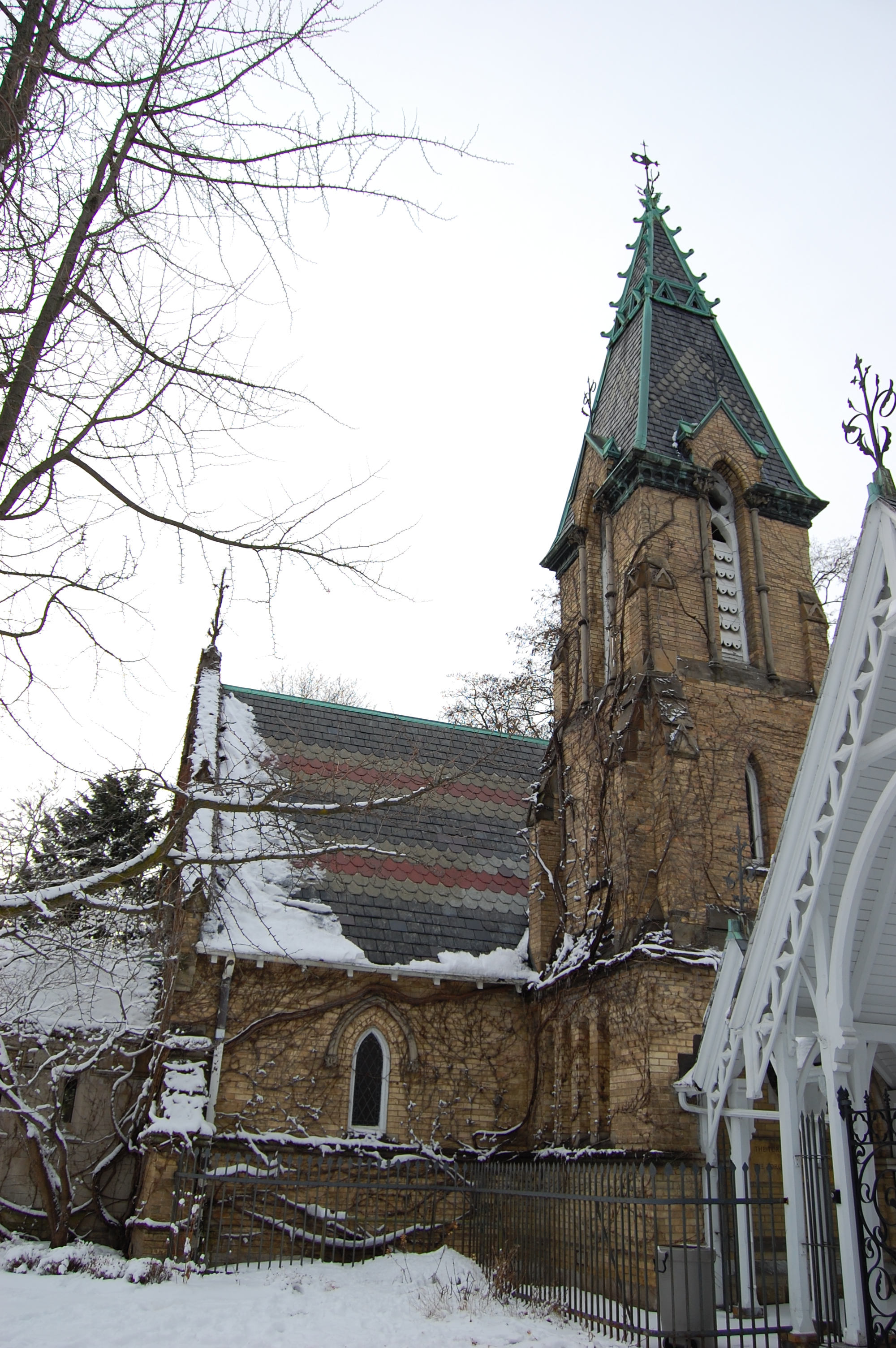
The Necropolis Chapel in Toronto

The Necropolis Chapel was built by the architect Henry Langley in 1872 in the Gothic Revival style. It is located at 200 Winchester Street, Toronto, in the Cabbagetown neighbourhood at the edge of the Don Valley. Its entrance is marked by masonry signage Toronto Crermatorium Chapel and massing of a pointed barrel vault that leads to the central part of the chapel. The latter has a simple gable roof, whose steep, pitched gables raise high to a sharp ridge. The square tower is placed on the east side of the plan, giving the edifice a picturesque, asymmetrical appearance that is tightly linked to the Gothic. This particularity shifts the center of gravity of the building, giving it an ascending diagonal axis. The steep slope of the roof along with the placement and configuration of the tower give the building a jagged, pointed contour. The dominant material used is yellow brick, with a stone entrance vault. The roof is covered with two different patterns of slates and is unique for its multicolored appearance. There are a number of High Gothic Revival style elements, which include rich wrought iron on fences, detailed trefoils carved on the stone facade, ridge cresting on the tower roof and finials. White sawn wood ornament decorates the eaves of the porch and the barge-boards of the steep gables of the lych-gate and the caretaker’s house (living room, dining room, kitchen, front and back staircases and upper bedrooms). The basement crematorium has been decommissioned. Kept almost intact over time, the Necropolis Chapel, lych-gate, and caretaker's cottage fit perfectly into their surrounding context, which is the heritage conservation district Cabbagetown.
