= St. Paul's Presbyterian Church (Peterborough, Ontario) =

- St. Paul's Presbyterian Church
- 44°18′23.3136″N 78°20′29.1084″W
- Location: 1545 Monaghan Road; Peterborough, Ontario; K9J 5N3
- Denomination: Presbyterian Church in Canada
- Website: stpaulspeterborough.ca

St. Paul's Presbyterian Church is the name of a Presbyterian Church in Canada congregation and also the name of the congregation's now-demolished church building at 120 Murray Street in the downtown core of Peterborough, Ontario, Canada.

Since 2018, the congregation has worshipped at The Mount Community Centre at 1545 Monaghan Road.

== History ==
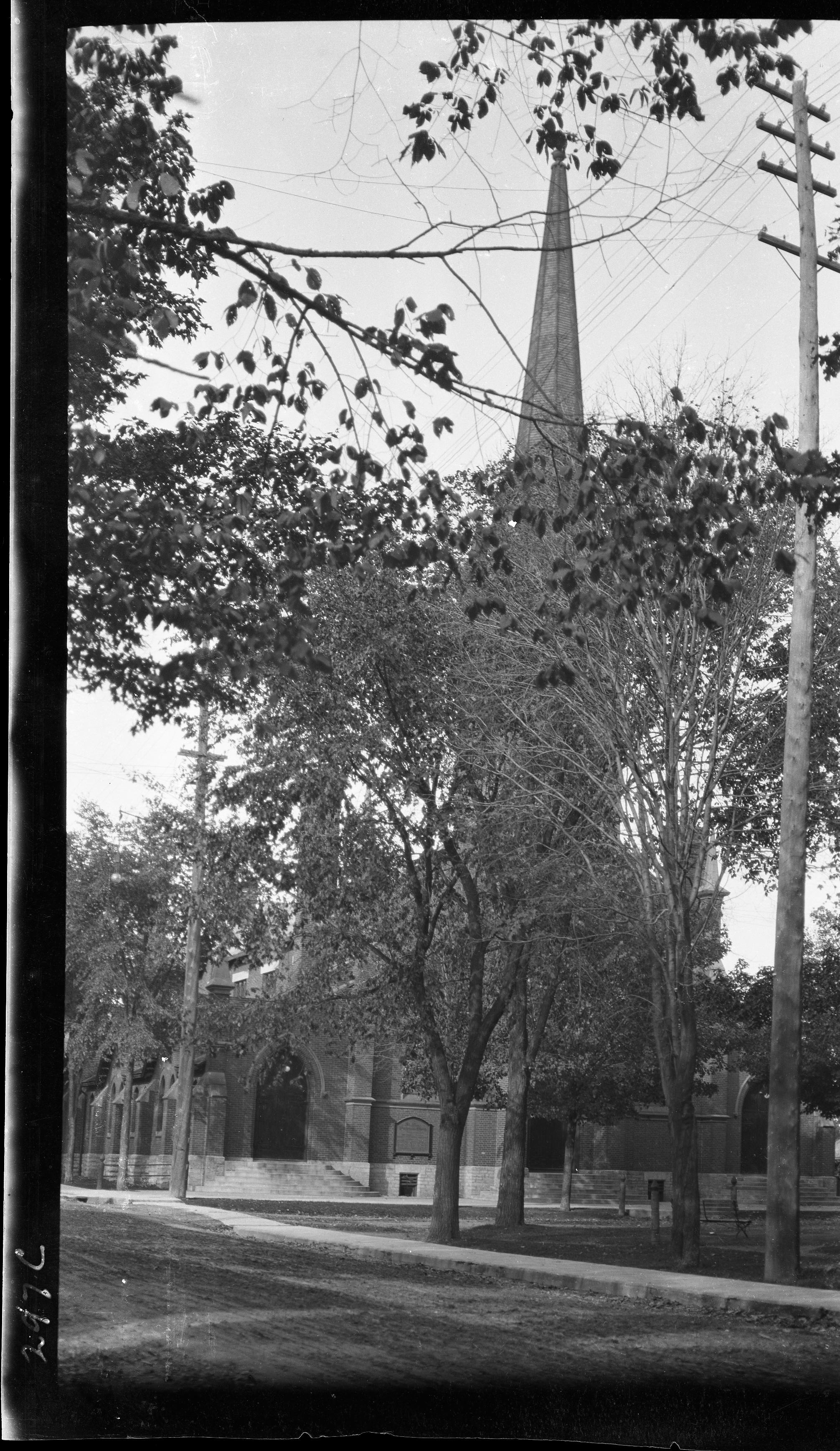
The congregation's now-demolished building at 120 Murray Street, 1911

In 1833, Rev. John Morrice Roger, a Presbyterian minister from Aberdeen, gathered a small local congregation which eventually evolved into St. Andrew's Presbyterian Church. Following the Disruption of 1843, there was a split between the Church of Scotland and the Free Church of Scotland. In Peterborough, the congregation split as well and the congregation of St. Paul's was formed. They worshipped in a schoolhouse that belonged to the Methodists until the construction of their building on Murray Street in 1859 at the cost of $20,000.

The building was completed in 1859 of red brick construction with a limestone foundation quarried in Jackson Park. The rotunda behind the sanctuary was completed in 1885 by Gordon & Helliwell.

In 1907, St. Paul's Mission in the south end of the City split to form its own congregation as Knox Presbyterian Church. Knox voted to join the United Church of Canada in 1925. St. Paul's elected to remain Presbyterian. Peterborough's two other Presbyterian churches, St. Giles' and St. Stephen's also began as missions of St. Paul's.

The church's manse was completed at 540 Water Street in 1912. In 1959, a Christian education wing was constructed. The addition was designed by Eberhard Zeidler.

In the 2010s, major structural issues forced the congregation out of the sanctuary. The congregation was unable to raise the funds to undertake necessary repairs and the building was sold to developer Kevin MacDonald. MacDonald demolished the 160-year-old church in 2019. He has done nothing with the empty lot.

The congregation now worships at The Mount Community Centre in the former Sisters of St. Joseph convent at 1545 Monaghan Road.
