= Hollydene (mansion) =

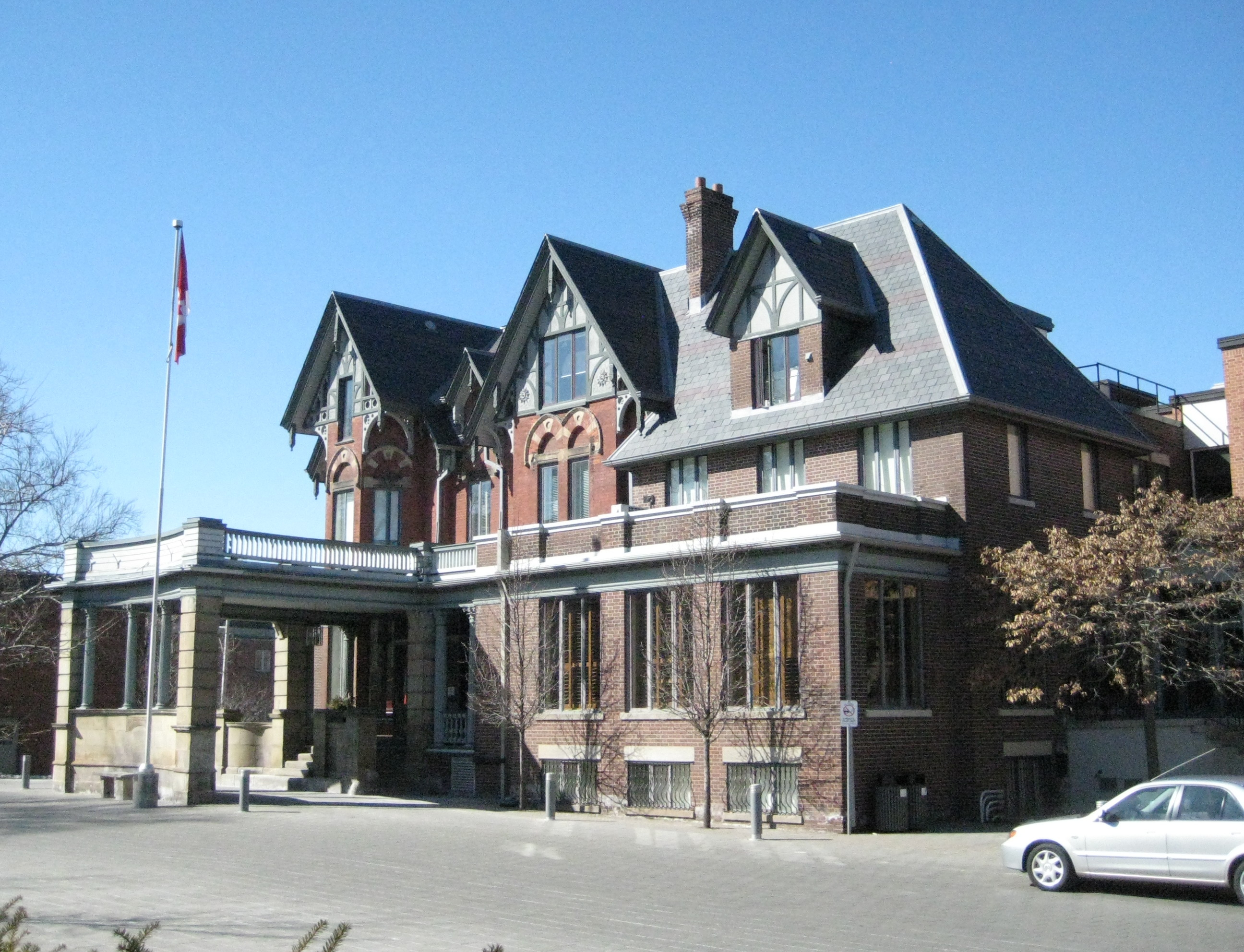
- Alternative names: John Blaikie House; Hugh Ryan House; Branksome Hall

General information
- Type: Gothic Revival Mansion
- Location: Rosedale, Toronto, Ontario, Canada, 10 Elm Avenue
- Coordinates: 43°40′30″N 79°22′48″W
- Groundbreaking: 1879
- Completed: 1880
- Owner: John Lang Blaikie (1879-1886); Hugh Ryan (railway magnate) (1886-1899); John T. Ryan (1899-1912); Branksome Hall (1912-present day)

Technical details
- Floor count: 3

Design and construction
- Architects: Langley, Langley & Burke

Hollydene, also known as the Hugh Ryan House and John Blaikie House, is a Gothic Revival mansion at 10 Elm Avenue in the Rosedale neighbourhood of Toronto, Ontario, Canada. Designed by the Toronto architectural firm Langley, Langley & Burke, it was constructed in 1879–1880 for businessman John Lang Blaikie. The three-storey residence is associated with Canadian industrialist Hugh Ryan (1832–1899), who owned and renovated the property in the later years of his life.

Ryan died at Hollydene in 1899, and the residence was bequeathed to his eldest son, John Thomas Ryan. The property was subsequently acquired by Edith M. Read in 1912, who intended it to be the new location of her independent girls' school, originally founded in 1903 by Margaret Scott and located at 102 Bloor Street East. Hollydene was renamed Branksome Hall and is now the centre of the school's expanding campus.

Hollydene incorporates elements of High Victorian, Gothic Revival, and Neoclassical architecture and is identified as one of Rosedale's twenty-two original estates. The property was added to the City of Toronto Heritage Property Inventory on 10 December 1975, and was subsequently included in the South Rosedale Heritage Conservation District, approved in 2003 and designated under Part V of the Ontario Heritage Act.

== Construction and early ownership (1878–1886) ==
=== Edgar John Jarvis and Elm Avenue ===
Hollydene was constructed on one of the four corner lots at the intersection of Bridge Street (later Huntley Street) and Elm Avenue, a residential area developed by Edgar John Jarvis as part of the subdivision of his Rosedale estate. In 1878, Jarvis officially opened Elm Avenue for property development and, with the assistance of his gardener and sons, planted over one-hundred elm trees along its length as his legacy.

=== John Lang Blaikie ===
In 1879, John Lang Blaikie, Esq. (1823–1912), a Scottish-born businessman, member of the Toronto Stock Exchange and real estate agent, acquired Lots 11 and 12 of Plan 326, situated on the north side of Elm Avenue immediately east of Bridge Street, from Edgar John Jarvis and commissioned the construction of Hollydene. The property was situated near the Castle Frank acreage, originally the colonial town of Little York. Architectural historian Patricia McHugh records that the residence, whose design was the work of Langley, Langley & Burke, was completed in 1880. The nearest visible holding from the property's rear lawns was the members-only Toronto Lacrosse Fields.

In her historical account of the neighbourhood, Rosedale, Bess Hillery Crawford identifies Hollydene as one of the area's twenty-two original estates, predating the expansion of luxury residential development during the 1890s.

Blaikie was born at Clarilawmoor Farm in Selkirkshire, Scotland, and immigrated to Canada in 1858 after working in Glasgow. He established himself in Toronto as a financier and real estate agent, forming the partnership Blaikie & Alexander with William Alexander. By 1884, Alexander had purchased the lot diagonally opposite Hollydene across Bridge Street and built his own residence. Blaikie's commercial interests included a directorship of the Northern Railway and the presidency of Consumers' Gas Company. He also served as a trustee of Toronto General Hospital.

== Hugh Ryan and the Ryan family (1886–1912) ==
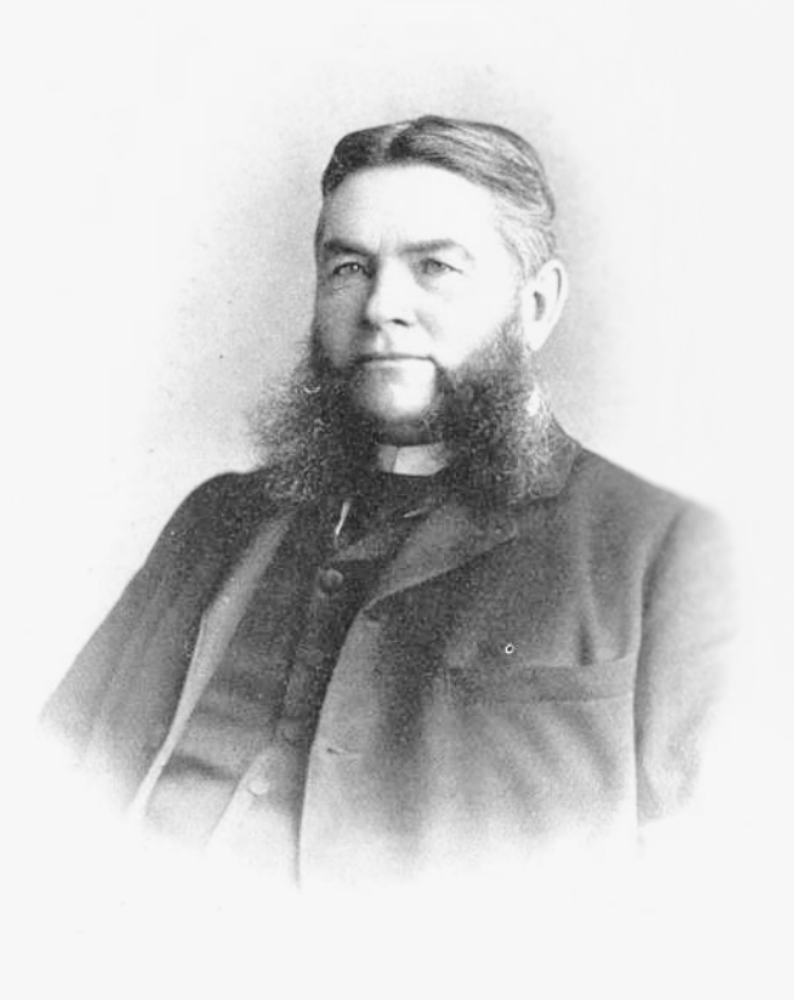
Railway magnate and second owner of Hollydene, Hugh Ryan

In October 1886, The Globe and Mail and other newspapers reported that Hollydene had been acquired for $27,000 by Hugh Ryan (1832–1899); an Irish-Canadian railway magnate, banker, and Catholic philanthropist. Born in Limerick, Ireland, Ryan emigrated to Canada with his family, including sister Alice Ryan, in 1841, settling near Montreal, Quebec.

Ryan began his railway career in 1850 on the St. Lawrence and Atlantic Railway under the direction of Polish-Canadian contractor and engineer Sir Casimir Stanislaus Gzowski. In 1855, Ryan founded the railway contracting firm H. & J. Ryan with his younger brother John Ryan; the company operated for the next forty years, expanding into bridge and canal construction.

During his residence at Hollydene, Ryan was active in Toronto's charitable institutions, serving as a trustee of Toronto General Hospital and vice-president of St. Michael's Hospital. In 1895, he financed the construction of a surgical wing at St. Michael's Hospital, which his wife, Mary Margaret Ryan, equipped. That same year the couple donated and furnished a nurses' residence on Victoria Street.

Ryan died at Hollydene of Bright's disease in 1899, bequeathing the mansion to his eldest son John Thomas Ryan in his estate. Hollydene remained in the Ryan family for over a decade and was documented during the family's occupancy in the J. H. Beers 1907 Commemorative Biographical Record of the County of York, Ontario.

"Hollydene," the home of Mr. and Mrs. Ryan, is one of the most beautiful spots in Toronto, and was built in 1876.

== Neighbourhood and residents ==
During the Ryan family's occupancy, Hollydene formed part of Rosedale's developing residential landscape, alongside mansions and estates commissioned by figures in Toronto's political, commercial, and industrial life.

Nearby residents in the 1880s and 1890s included Ontario Attorney General James Joseph "J. J." Foy, whose mansion was named Foy House; Speaker of the Canadian Senate Sir David Lewis Macpherson, whose estate was known as Chestnut Park; and politician Joseph Cawthra, a member of Toronto's Cawthra family.

Other residents included wholesale importer Bernard B. Hughes, whose residence was known as Hughes Terrace; businessman George Albertus Cox, whose Italianate villa was designed by Frederick Cumberland; meat-packing industrialist William Davies, whose residence, Lorne Hall, was also designed by Langley, Langley & Burke; and H. H. Fudger, president of Simpson's department store, whose former residence is known as the H. H. Fudger House.

== Acquisition by Branksome Hall ==
In 1912, Hollydene was acquired from the Ryans for $48,000 by Edith M. Read as the new location for Branksome Hall, an independent girls' school founded in 1903 by educator Margaret Scott.

Branksome Hall originally operated at 102 Bloor Street East, in the mansion known as Rivermount, formerly owned by Canadian senator Sir Frank Smith, whose son, James Austin Smith, married Hugh Ryan's daughter, Mary Alice Ryan. During preparations for its relocation to Hollydene, Branksome Hall temporarily occupied the premises at 592 Sherbourne Street.

The conversion of Hollydene into educational facilities involved adaptations to the main residence and its outbuildings. The former carriage house was converted into classrooms and a gymnasium; the upper floor of the main house accommodated an art room and additional classrooms; the conservatory became a kindergarten; and French classes were held in the enclosed veranda.

== Architecture ==
=== Exterior and grounds ===
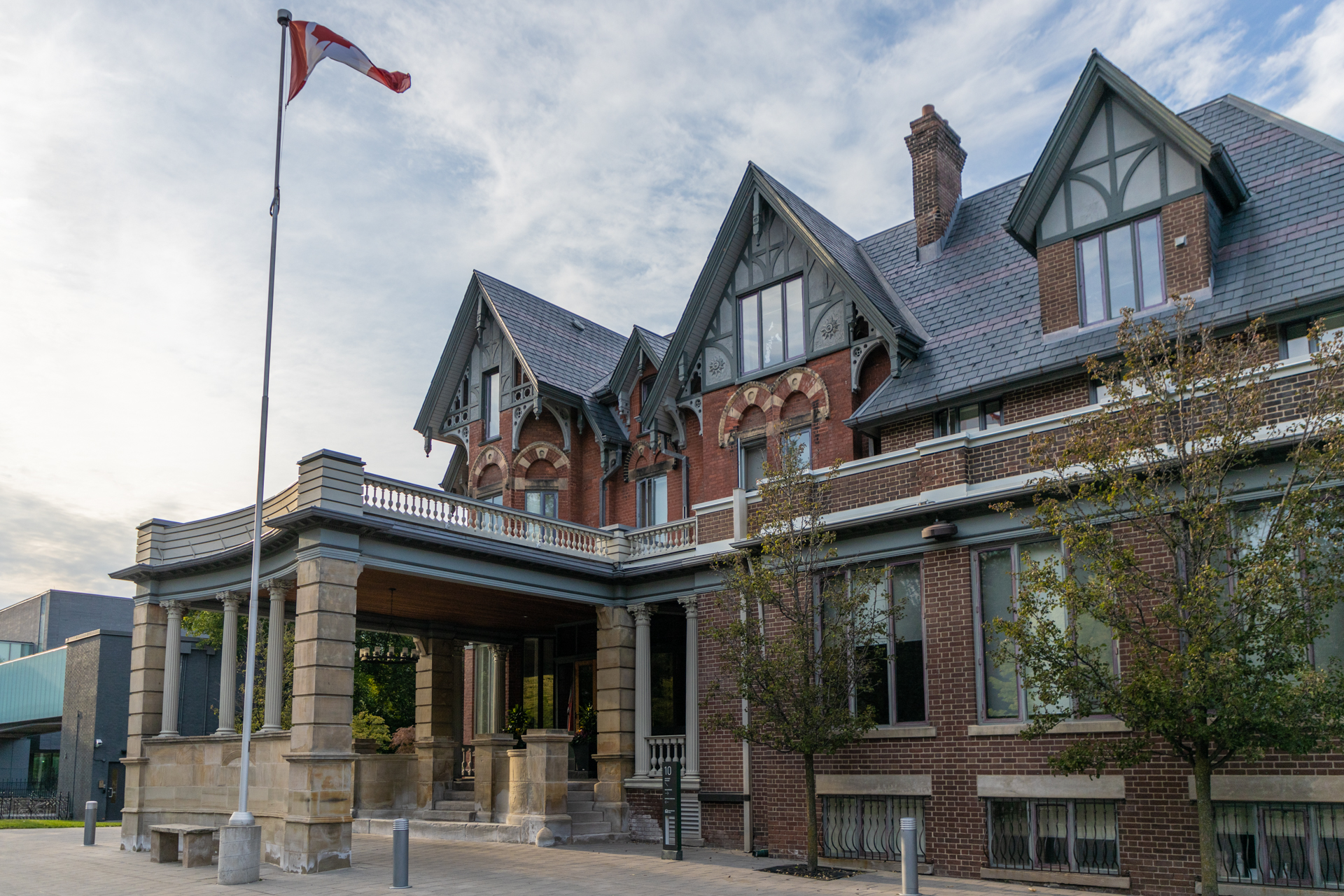
Hollydene now incorporated as part of the wider campus of Branksome Hall.

Hollydene is a three-storey red-brick residence designed by the Toronto architectural firm Langley, Langley & Burke, which was also responsible for the spire of St. Michael's Cathedral Basilica and McMaster Hall. Architectural historian Lucy Booth Martyn described Hollydene's exterior in her 1980 book Aristocratic Toronto: 19th Century Grandeur, noting its steeply pitched roofs, prominent twin south-facing gables, polychromatic masonry, and elaborate decorative timberwork. Its design incorporates elements of High Victorian and Neoclassical architecture and shares characteristics with the Gothic Revival villa tradition, which also influenced the development of Toronto's distinctive bay-and-gable residential architecture during the late nineteenth century.

The roof is covered in alternating bands of grey-blue and muted-purple tiles, creating a patterned surface characteristic of High Victorian polychromy. Its steeply pitched gables feature ornamental timber framing, pointed and trefoil-inspired Gothic motifs, circular pierced panels, and decorative brackets beneath the projecting eaves. The gable ends combine painted wooden members with recessed infill panels and small ornamental openings.

The red-brick elevations are articulated by tall, narrow windows surmounted by paired semi-circular arches of contrasting red and cream masonry. The arches incorporate decorative keystones and projecting stone detailing, while the upper gables are supported by carved wooden brackets and ornamental bargeboards. Projecting bays and substantial brick chimney stacks contribute to the building's asymmetrical roofline.

At ground level, the residence features a large porte-cochère with a concave front, with a concave frontage, designed to accommodate two-horse carriages, and an open veranda extending across the front and eastern side of the building. The enclosed veranda, added by Hugh Ryan, terminated at a glass conservatory, while columns with acanthus-leaf capitals form part of the architectural treatment.

A driveway east of the residence originally led to a brick stable and carriage house, which housed living quarters on its upper floor. The expansive grounds included several principal lawns, formally clipped hedges, topiary, flowering shrubs, and a rustic bridge spanning a stream leading into Huntley Ravine; the Ryans used the gardens for entertaining, including garden parties, while an ornamental iron fence enclosed the property along Elm Avenue and the adjoining street.

Hollydene's surviving exterior, now a central building of the Branksome Hall campus, retains many of the architectural features documented in historical descriptions and images of the residence, including its steep gables, patterned roofing, decorative timberwork, contrasting brick arches, and porte-cochère. The original grounds have been extensively developed to accommodate the expanding East and West Branksome campuses, now totalling thirteen acres, divided by Mount Pleasant Avenue.

=== Interior ===
According to architectural historian Lucy Booth Martyn in Aristocratic Toronto: 19th Century Grandeur, Hollydene's principal entrance opened into a broad central hallway containing a staircase that curved at its base to form two landings, with newel posts tapering upward to a point; the doors throughout the upper and lower halls featured narrow vertical wooden boards across their upper two-thirds and diagonal boards extending toward the lower corners.

On the western side of the ground floor was a double drawing room with a fourteen-foot ceiling and Neoclassical decoration, later known to Branksome Hall students as the “Blue Room.” The furnished space contained projecting bays on its southern and western elevations, each fitted with three long windows divided by tracery.

Two fireplaces with painted pinewood mantels formed part of the drawing room's original decoration, while interior shutters folded into frames beside the windows. A smaller reception room occupied the eastern side of the entrance hall, with the large dining room situated behind it.

=== Furnishings and artwork ===
Contemporary accounts published in the Toronto Telegram in 1910 provide a detailed record of Hollydene's domestic interiors during the final years of its use as the Ryan family's private residence, before its acquisition by Branksome Hall in 1912. The accounts document a range of furnishings and household equipment, including mahogany drawing-room and dining-room suites, black walnut wardrobes, weathered-oak library furniture, pietra dura tables, a Parisian parlour cabinet, and a collection of oil paintings and watercolours by Canadian artists Frederick Arthur Verner, Lucius Richard O'Brien, Henry Harold Vickers, and others. Musical instruments included a Steinway & Sons baby grand piano and a Weber upright pianoforte, while other decorative furnishings comprised imported Persian rugs, Axminster carpets, custom Irish-made draperies, Chinese folding screens, Waterford crystal, and crystal gasaliers. The accounts also recorded electric lighting fixtures, refrigerators, an Imperial Oxford cooking range, and a library containing more than 800 volumes.
