= Mount St. Joseph (Peterborough, Ontario) =

Heritage building in Peterborough, Ontario

The Mount Community Centre
- Former names: Mount St. Joseph (1895–2013); Inglewood (1869–1895)

General information
- Architectural style: Gothic Revival; Neoclassical
- Location: 1545 Monaghan Road; Peterborough, Ontario; K9J 5N3
- Coordinates: 44°18′23.3136″N 78°20′29.1084″W
- Construction started: 1869
- Client: David G. Halton

Website
- www.themountpeterborough.ca

Mount St. Joseph, now known as The Mount Community Centre, is a former convent of the Sisters of St. Joseph of Peterborough, located at 1545 Monaghan Road in Peterborough, Ontario, Canada. The building, originally a farmhouse built in 1869, was the Sisters' motherhouse from 1895 until 2008.

In 2009, the Mount was sold to a private developer and sat empty until 2013 when it was purchased by the Peterborough Poverty Reduction Network and converted into The Mount Community Centre, a non-religious, non-profit corporation with charitable status, and affordable housing units.

The building is designated by the City of Peterborough under Part IV of the Ontario Heritage Act by By-Law 09-158 as being of cultural heritage value or interest.

== History ==
=== Halton and Sherwood families ===
The building was built in 1869 as a private residence for David G. Halton, a local police magistrate, known as Inglewood. In the late 1860s, Inglewood was sold to the Sherwood family who owned it until selling it and its 10-acre property to the Sisters of St. Joseph for $6,350 in 1893.

=== Sister of St. Joseph of Peterborough ===
The Congregation of the Sisters of St. Joseph was founded in Le Puy-en-Velay, France, in 1650. The congregation was established in Toronto in 1851 by Mother Delphine Fontbonne and three other Sisters of St. Joseph of Philadelphia. Mother Austin Doran was the founding Mother Superior of the Peterborough congregation. In 1890, at the request of Bishop Richard Alphonsus O'Connor, she led the small group of sisters from Toronto to establish a congregation for the Diocese of Peterborough and to help run St. Joseph's Hospital. The Sisters bought the Inglewood farmhouse and surrounding property in 1893. The Sisters had little money and the Bishop was unwilling to offer financial support so Mother Austin had to borrow $1000 from her sister-in-law and borrow the rest from the bank to finance the purchase. Bishop O'Connor blessed the new motherhouse on January 1, 1895.

At its peak, the Mount was home to over 100 sisters. The Peterborough congregation branched out to communities throughout the diocese and beyond such as Sault Ste. Marie, North Bay and Parry Sound. They taught in local Catholic schools until the late 1970s and were active in the running of St. Joseph's Hospital until 1988.

In 2008, facing a shrinking congregation, the Sisters decided to sell the Mount and built a smaller, modern, environmentally conscious convent designed by Teeple Architects nextdoor. The new convent won the 2012 OAA Design Excellence Award.

=== The Mount Community Centre ===
After being sold by the Sisters, the Mount was purchased by a private developer. Their plans for a condominium development never came to fruition and it was put up for sale again in 2013. Since 2011, the Peterborough Poverty Reduction Network had been investigating the potential and the risks of acquiring the former Mount building as a community asset. The network agreed to purchase the property on July 30, 2013. The space is now run by a non-profit corporation known as The Mount Community Centre. The former dormitories have been converted into affordable housing units.

Today space in the building is leased by community organizations such as the Victorian Order of Nurses and the Kawartha Land Trust. The Mount has been home to St. Paul's Presbyterian Church since 2018 when their 1859 church building in downtown Peterborough was declared unstable, sold and subsequently demolished.

== Architecture ==
The original Inglewood farmhouse, dating from 1869, survives at the centre of the building. Originally an Italianate residence, later remodelling transformed the building into the more ecclesiastical Neoclassical and Gothic Revival styles. It was expanded in 1904, 1911, 1933, 1952 and 1969. Noted Toronto-based ecclesiastical architect Arthur W. Holmes designed the chapel constructed in 1933 in the Gothic Revival style.
