= Toronto Chinese Baptist Church =

Church in Toronto, Canada

Coordinates: 43.651847°N 79.393435°W

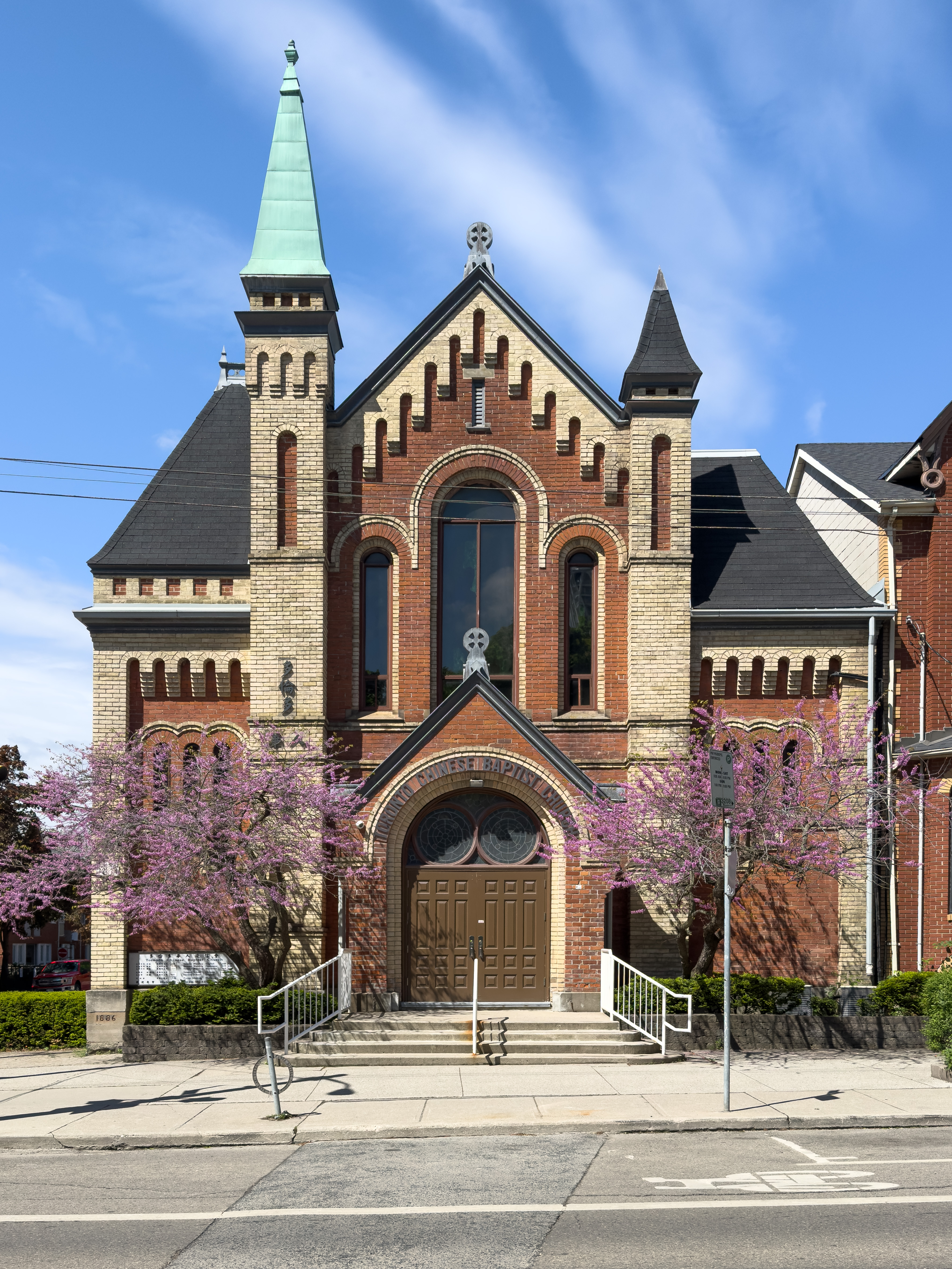
The Toronto Chinese Baptist Church at 74 Beverly

The Toronto Chinese Baptist Church is a Baptist church serving the Chinese-Canadian community of Toronto, Ontario, Canada. It is affiliated with Canadian Baptists of Ontario and Quebec.

== History ==
It was originally built as Beverley Street Baptist Church in 1880 as an outreach of Jarvis Street Baptist Church while the rest of the church was completed in 1886. The architects were Langley and Burke.

Funding was largely donated by William McMaster and it is a designated historic building. It overlooks The Grange that is today attached to the Art Gallery of Ontario.

The church is located just to the east of the heart of Toronto's Chinatown. Chinese Baptists first met in the basement of the building in 1967. Five years later the church was purchased for the Chinese community with services being held in Cantonese. Today the church offers services in Cantonese, Mandarin and English. The growing Chinese-Canadian Baptist community has also led to the East Toronto, North Toronto, Mississauga and Scarborough Chinese Baptist Churches being established in Toronto's suburbs as well as the Windsor Chinese Baptist Church. Many of these daughter churches have in turn established daughter churches of their own further into the suburbs.

== See also ==
- Chinese in Toronto
