= Emmanuel United Church =

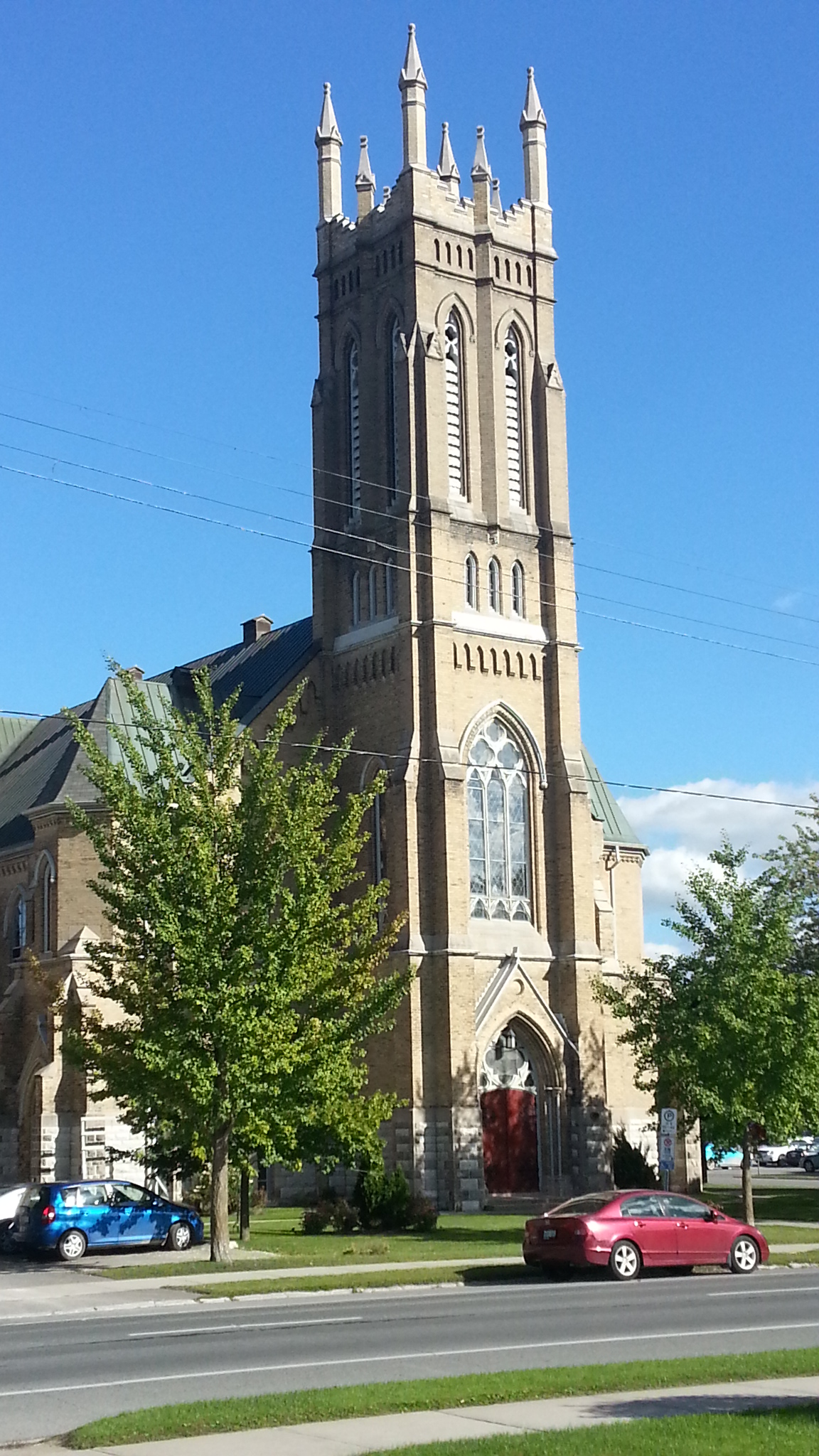
- Emmanuel United Church (when George Street United Church) in 2014
- Emmanuel United Church
- 44°18′35.748″N 78°19′10.884″W
- Location: 534 George Street North; Peterborough, Ontario; K9H 3S2
- Denomination: United Church of Canada
- Previous denomination: Methodist Church
- Website: www.emmanuelunitedptbo.ca

History
- Former name(s): George Street United Church (1925–2016); George Street Methodist Church (1873–1925)

Architecture
- Architect: Henry Langley
- Style: Gothic Revival
- Years built: 1873–1891

Emmanuel United Church is a church located in the downtown core of Peterborough, Ontario, Canada. Originally Methodist, since 1925 it has belonged to the United Church of Canada. The church was built between 1873 and 1875, with the tower being completed in 1891, and was designed by Henry Langley in the Gothic Revival style. It is designated under Part IV of the Ontario Heritage Act by the City of Peterborough By-Law 1990-204 as being of cultural heritage value or interest.

The congregation is an amalgamation of George Street United Church (formerly George Street Methodist Church), which has worshiped at this site since 1875, and St. Andrew's United Church (formerly St. Andrew's Presbyterian Church). After the 2016 amalgamation, they alternated between the two church buildings until St. Andrew's was sold in 2017 and now meet solely at the George Street building.

== History ==
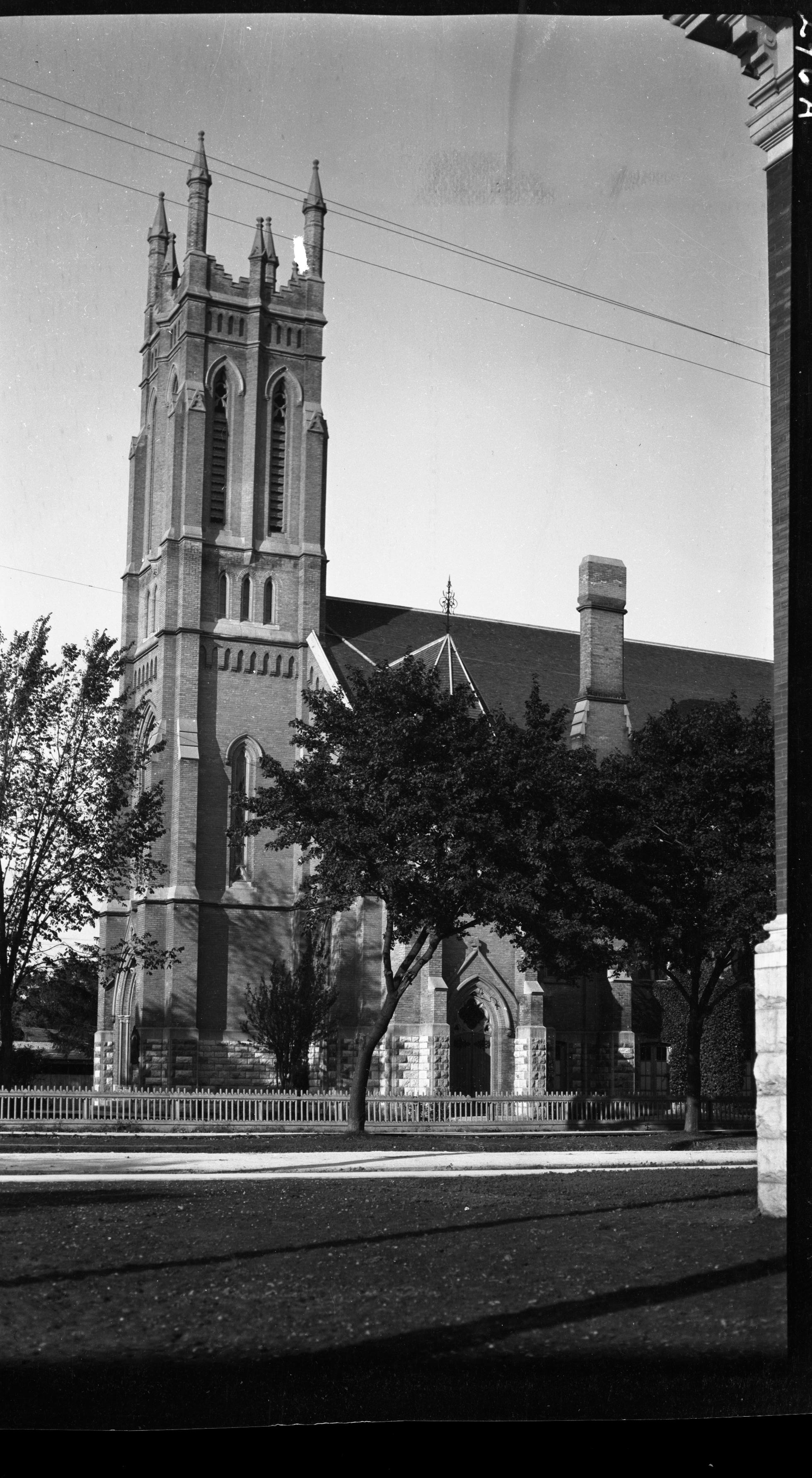
George Street Methodist Church in 1911

=== George Street United Church ===
The church was founded as a Methodist congregation in 1837. It was initially housed in a small frame building across the street from the present site. In 1843, a second and more sizeable stuccoed timber frame building was erected just south of the earlier church. The frame of the original Methodist Meeting House survives as the Heritage Pavilion in Ashburnham Memorial Park beside the Peterborough Museum & Archives.

By 1872 the congregation was in need of a larger space and purchased two lots from William Cluxton to build their new church. Construction cost $60,000 and the new George Street Methodist Church was formally dedicated on Christmas Day 1875. The tower was completed in 1891.

From 1907–1910, the Rev. Edwin Arthur Pearson, father of future Prime Minister Lester B. Pearson, was minister and lived in the neighboring manse with his family.

On June 10, 1925, when the Methodist, Congregational and two-thirds of the Presbyterian Church in Canada amalgamated to form the United Church of Canada, George Street Methodist became George Street United.

=== St. Andrew's United Church ===
The St. Andrew's congregation was founded in 1833 by the Rev. John Morrice Roger, a Presbyterian minister from Aberdeen. In the 1840s, a schism in the Church of Scotland saw Rev. Roger and half the congregation split to form St. Paul's Presbyterian Church aligned with the Free Church of Scotland. The old 'Stone Kirk' was destroyed by a fire in 1884 and a new Gothic Revival church was constructed in 1885 by Gordon & Helliwell.

In 1925, St. Andrew's Presbyterian Church voted to join the newly formed United Church of Canada.

== Amalgamation ==
On July 1, 2016, faced with dwindling congregations, George Street United Church and St. Andrew's United Church amalgamated to form Emmanuel United Church. Initially, the congregation alternated between the two buildings with the George Street building being known as the east campus. In 2017, the St. Andrew's building at 441 Rubidge Street was sold and the congregation now solely worships at the George Street site. Trinity United Church held a vote to merge with Emmanuel in April 2019. The motion to merge was defeated and Trinity closed in June 2022.

== Architecture ==
The church was designed in the Gothic Revival style by Henry Langley. It resembles his Metropolitan United Church in Toronto. It has a Latin cross layout and is of grey and buff brick construction with a limestone foundation. There is a small sculpted bust of John Wesley on the façade of the tower.
