= Branksome Hall =

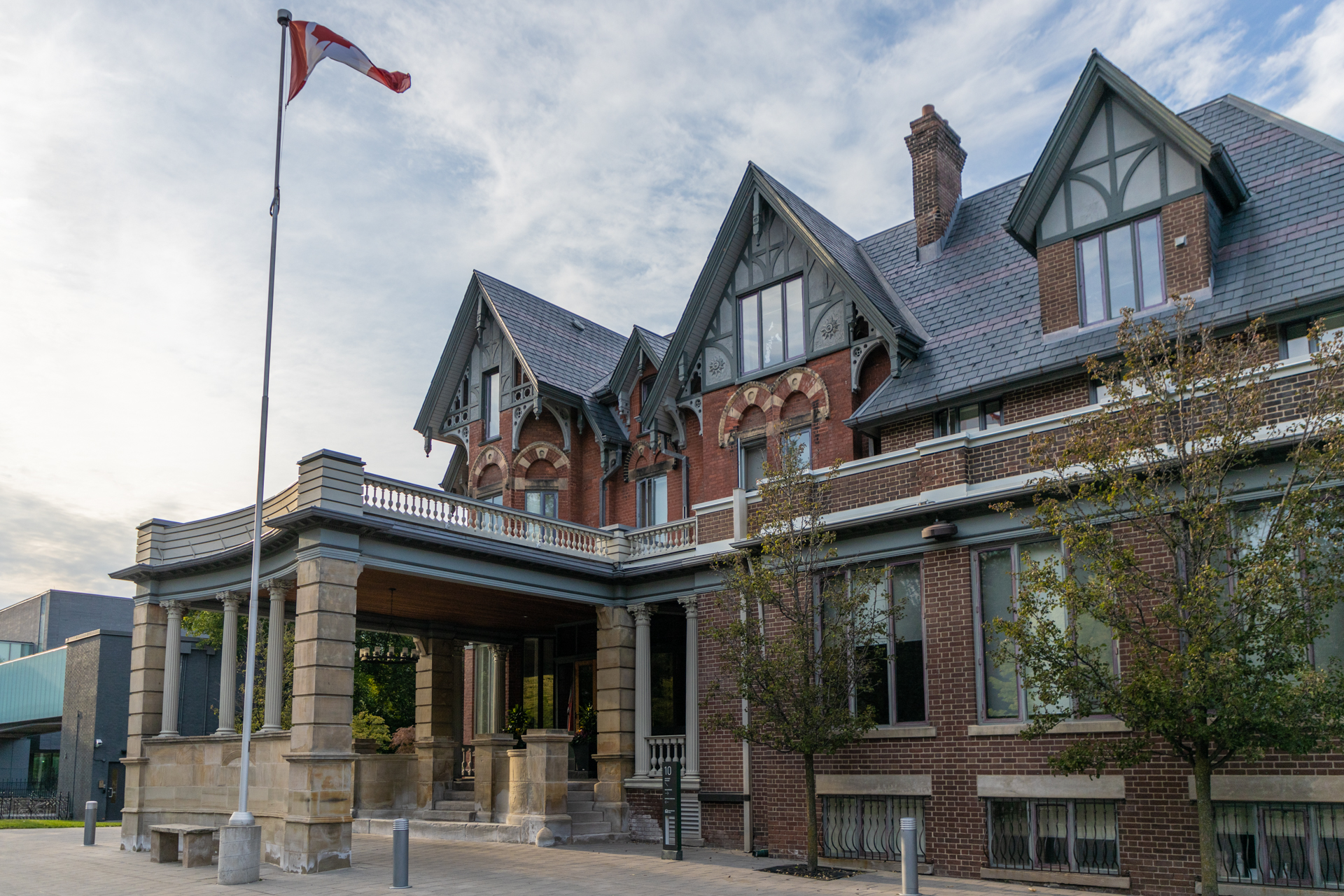

Location
- 10 Elm Avenue; Toronto, Ontario, M4W 1N4; Canada; 43°40′30″N 79°22′48″W

Information
- School type: Independent day and boarding university-preparatory
- Motto: Keep Well The Road
- Founded: 1903
- Principal: Grace McCallum
- Grades: JK – 12
- Gender: Girls
- Enrollment: Approximately 900
- Language: English
- Campus: Urban
- Colours: Red, green, black and white
- Mascot: Ribbit the Frog
- Team name: Highlanders
- Website: branksome.on.ca

Branksome Hall is an independent day and boarding school for girls in Toronto, Ontario, Canada. It is Toronto's only all-years International Baccalaureate (IB) World School for girls. Branksome Hall is located on a 13-acre campus in the Toronto neighbourhood of Rosedale and educates more than 900 students from Junior Kindergarten to Grade 12.

Branksome Hall has an athletics and wellness centre, spaces dedicated to innovation and technology, indoor rock-climbing wall and tennis courts. The school has a boarding program for Grades 7 to 12 and a study abroad program with its sister school, Branksome Hall Asia, on Jeju Island, South Korea. Financial assistance is available for new and returning students in Grades 7 to 12.

Branksome Hall is led by principal Grace McCallum, with Emily MacLean leading the Junior School, Erika Lo leading the Middle School and Evita Strobele leading the Senior School.

== History ==
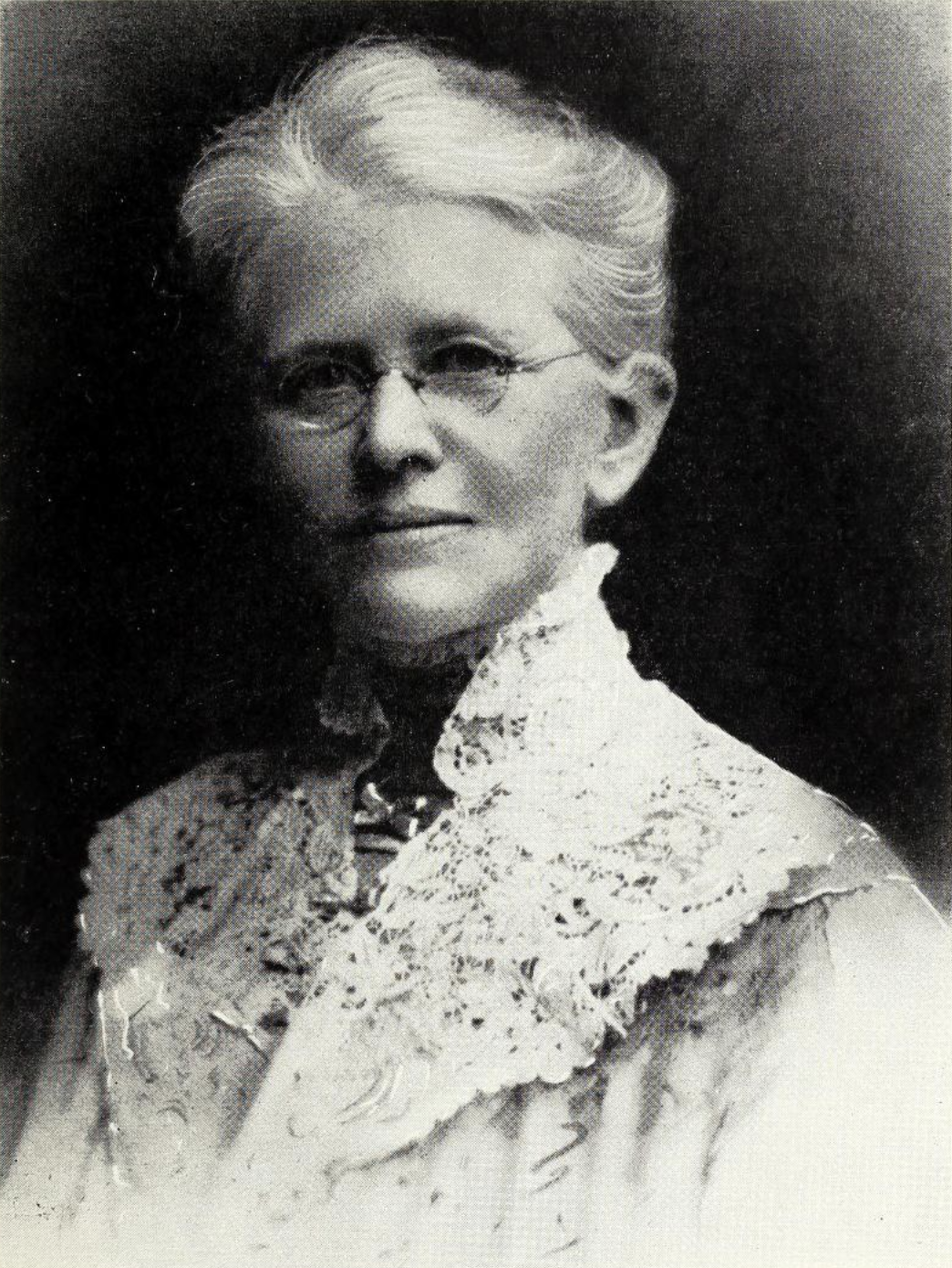
Miss Margaret Scott

=== Founding & Early Years ===
Branksome Hall was founded in 1903 by Margaret Scott, who was the school's first principal. It is named for Walter Scott’s poem, "The Lay of the Last Minstrel", which references Scotland's Branxholme Castle.

The historic Gothic Revival building at the heart of the campus was the personal mansion of Canadian railway magnate Hugh Ryan named Hollydene; whose heirs sold the property to Edith M. Read in 1912.

Branksome Hall was originally located at 102 Bloor Street East. In 1910, during preparations for its relocation to the Hollydene property at 10 Elm Avenue, Branksome Hall temporarily occupied premises at 592 Sherbourne Street and Edith Read was appointed principal.

The school relocated to 10 Elm Avenue property at the end of 1912. Between 1912 and 1948, principal Read added five additional homes to the campus and built a gymnasium and pool. She introduced the Prefect and Clan systems and adopted the Hunting Stewart tartan for the school uniform. Branksome Hall students in grades JK-2 wear a tunic, and those in grades 3-12 wear a kilt - a nod to Margaret Scott's heritage.

In 1940 a small group of girls and staff from Sherborne Girls’ School in England was evacuated to Branksome Hall. The relationship between the two schools continues; every year, students from each school participate in an exchange where they stay with host families in each country, sharing school and family life.

=== Post-War Expansion & Principals ===
Edith Read retired after 48 years as principal in 1958. Six principals have led the school since: Dr. Jennie MacNeill (1958–68), Miss Margaret Sime (1968–74), Miss Alison Roach (1974–93), Dr. Rachel Phillips Belash (1993–98), Karen L. Jurjevich (1998–2024) and current principal Grace McCallum.

=== Modern Era & IB Transition ===
The school became a fully-authorized IB World School in 2003, opened Branksome Hall Asia in 2012, the athletics and wellness centre in 2015, and hosted feminist icon Gloria Steinem in 2017. In 2026, the Karen L. Jurjevich Innovation Centre and Studio Theatre opened, the first facility of its kind for a K-12 school in Canada and one of only five in North America. The school has been an Apple Distinguished School since 2023.

The Road Well Kept by Heather Robertson was published in 2002 to mark Branksome's centennial. The book provides a synopsis of the history of the school, including archival photographs.

== Campus and Facilities ==
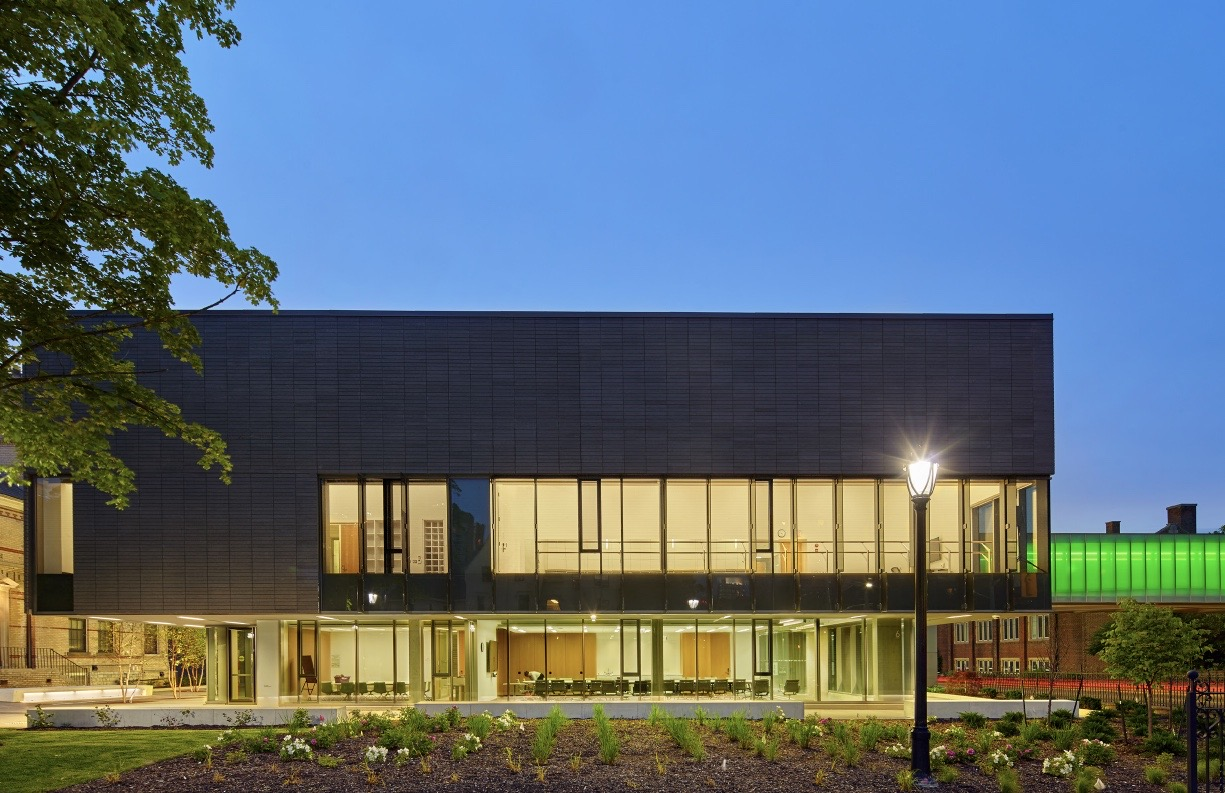
Athletics and Wellness Centre

Branksome Hall's campus includes East and West campuses divided by Mount Pleasant Avenue, as well as a ravine woodlot. Facilities include junior, middle and senior school buildings, administrative buildings, a uniform shop, two boarding residences, an outdoor classroom, lower field and tennis courts.

In 2015, the new athletics and wellness centre opened, designed by MacLennan Jaunkalns Miller Architects. The facility has two saltwater pools, a gymnasium, a fitness centre, yoga and dance studios, an erg rowing room, a dining hall with a kitchen, and rooftop terraces. In 2017, the landscape design for the building, created by PMA, received the Toronto Urban Design Award of Excellence.

The Karen L. Jurjevich Innovation Centre and Studio Theatre (iCAST), designed by Ennead and MJMA, opened in September 2026, and includes spaces for performing arts, innovation, and collaboration, including a STEAM studio, wood and machine shops, robotics lab, design space, and a black-box studio theatre.

== Academics ==
=== IB Continuum ===
Branksome Hall's curriculum offers all three International Baccalaureate programs: the Primary Years Programme (PYP), Middle Years Programme (MYP) and International Baccalaureate Diploma Programme (DP).

=== Faculty ===
In 2022, Math Instructional Leader and teacher Edith Louie was recognized with the René Descartes Medal. She has taught mathematics at Branksome Hall for 25 years.

Heather Friesen, Head, Curriculum Innovation & Professional Learning, was awarded the 2022 Continuing and Professional Learning (CPL) Award of Excellence from the Ontario Institute for Studies in Education (OISE) of the University of Toronto.

In 2023, Junior School Innovation and Technology Coordinator Isabella Liu received the Prime Minister's Award for Teaching Excellence in STEM.

== Student Life ==
Branksome Hall follows the IB's experiential learning framework of creativity, activity and service. IB Diploma students are required to complete approximately three to five hours per week of Creativity, Activity and Service (CAS) during their final two years of high school.

Service learning activities for students include Reading Buddies and JUMP Math at Rose Avenue Public School, Kapapamahchakwew (Wandering Spirit School) Reading Program, engaging with students at Sunny View Public School, and volunteering at Let's Grow Learning and Living Hub for medically complex, physically disabled adults.

=== Athletics ===
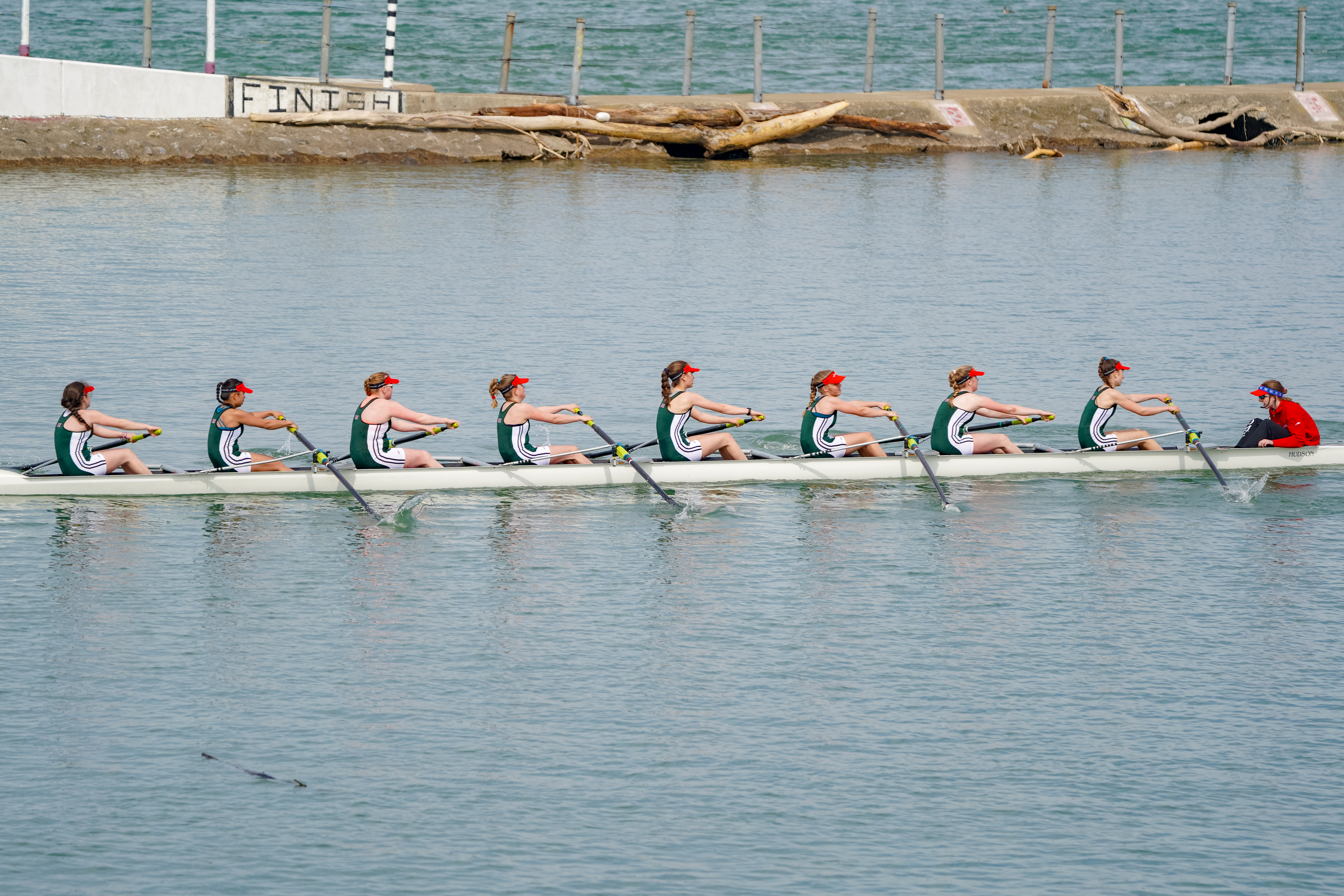
Branksome Hall rowing team

Branksome's Athletics teams are called the Highlanders. The school is a member of the Conference of Independent Schools of Ontario Athletic Association. Fall teams, winter and spring teams include the following sports:

| Fall Teams | Winter Teams | Spring Teams |
|---|---|---|
| Basketball | Alpine Skiing | Golf |
| Flag Football | Badminton | Rowing |
| Cross-Country Running | Ice Hockey | Softball |
| Disc Golf | Rowing | Rugby |
| Field Hockey | Squash | Tennis |
| Rowing | Swimming | Track & Field |
| Soccer | Volleyball | Ultimate Frisbee |
| Swimming | | |

=== Debate ===
In April 2025, a Grade 12 Branksome student became World Champion of the 2025 World Individual Debating and Public Speaking Championships, held Kuala Lumpur, directly following another Grade 12 Branksome student's win in 2024 in Canberra, Australia.

=== Noodle ===
Noodle is Branksome's business accelerator program for students from Grades 5 to 12. Supported by mentors, students move through all stages of creating a business. The program ends with a trade show, where students showcase their businesses to parents, employees and other students.

=== World Affairs Conference ===
Co-hosted every year by Branksome Hall and Upper Canada College, the World Affairs Conference is Canada's longest-running, student-led conference. Hundreds of secondary students and teachers from across Toronto gather to hear speakers and leaders, who have included Stephen Lewis, Roberta Bondar, Edward Snowden and Martin Luther King III, on variety of topics including human rights, gender issues, justice, globalization and health ethics.

== Governance & Endowment ==
Branksome Hall is administered by an 18-member Board of Governors. The current chair is Daniel Moore, CEO and co-founder of River Run Ventures. The Branksome Hall Foundation, a registered charity in Ontario since 2005, is overseen by an independent board of trustees chaired by Scot Martin, and manages the school's endowment.

== Notable alumnae ==
- Margaret Aitken, author, columnist, journalist and politician.
- Heather Elizabeth Apple, writer, artist, and educator
- Jackie Burroughs, Canadian actress who portrayed Aunt Hetty on CBC's Road to Avonlea
- Carmen Busquets, entrepreneur in fashion and luxury industries, co-founder and investor of Net-A-Porter
- Joan Chalmers, arts patron and philanthropist
- Grace Morris Craig, writer and artist
- Frances Dafoe, world champion figure skater and Olympic silver medalist
- Lindsey Deluce, news anchor of CP24
- Miranda de Pencier, award-winning film producer
- Stacey Farber, actress, best known for her role as Ellie Nash on the Canadian teen drama Degrassi: The Next Generation
- Amy S. Foster, author and songwriter
- Marjorie Gross, television writer and producer
- Sarah Levy, actress, best known as Twyla Sands on the Netflix TV show Schitt's Creek
- Helen McCully, food writer, critic and cookbook author
- Linda McQuaig, journalist and author of works of non-fiction, including The Wealthy Banker's Wife
- Mary Louise Northway, psychologist
- Susan Quaggin, nephrologist
- Ann Rohmer, lead anchor of CP24
- Evany Rosen, actress, stand-up comic and founding member of the sketch comedy troupe Picnicface
- Nancy Ruth, Ontario senator and philanthropist
- Meredith Shaw, radio and television personality, model, body positivity activist, style expert, known for co-hosting CityTV's Breakfast Television
- Frances Alice Shepherd, Canadian oncologist recognized for her research on lung cancer
- Claire Wallace, journalist and radio broadcaster for CBC from 1936 to 1952
- Budge Wilson, award-winning Canadian author
- Lisa Brunga, 2026 Winter Olympian - Alpine Skiing (Albania)

== Notable Faculty & Staff ==
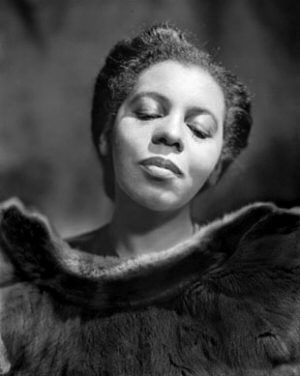
- Portia White
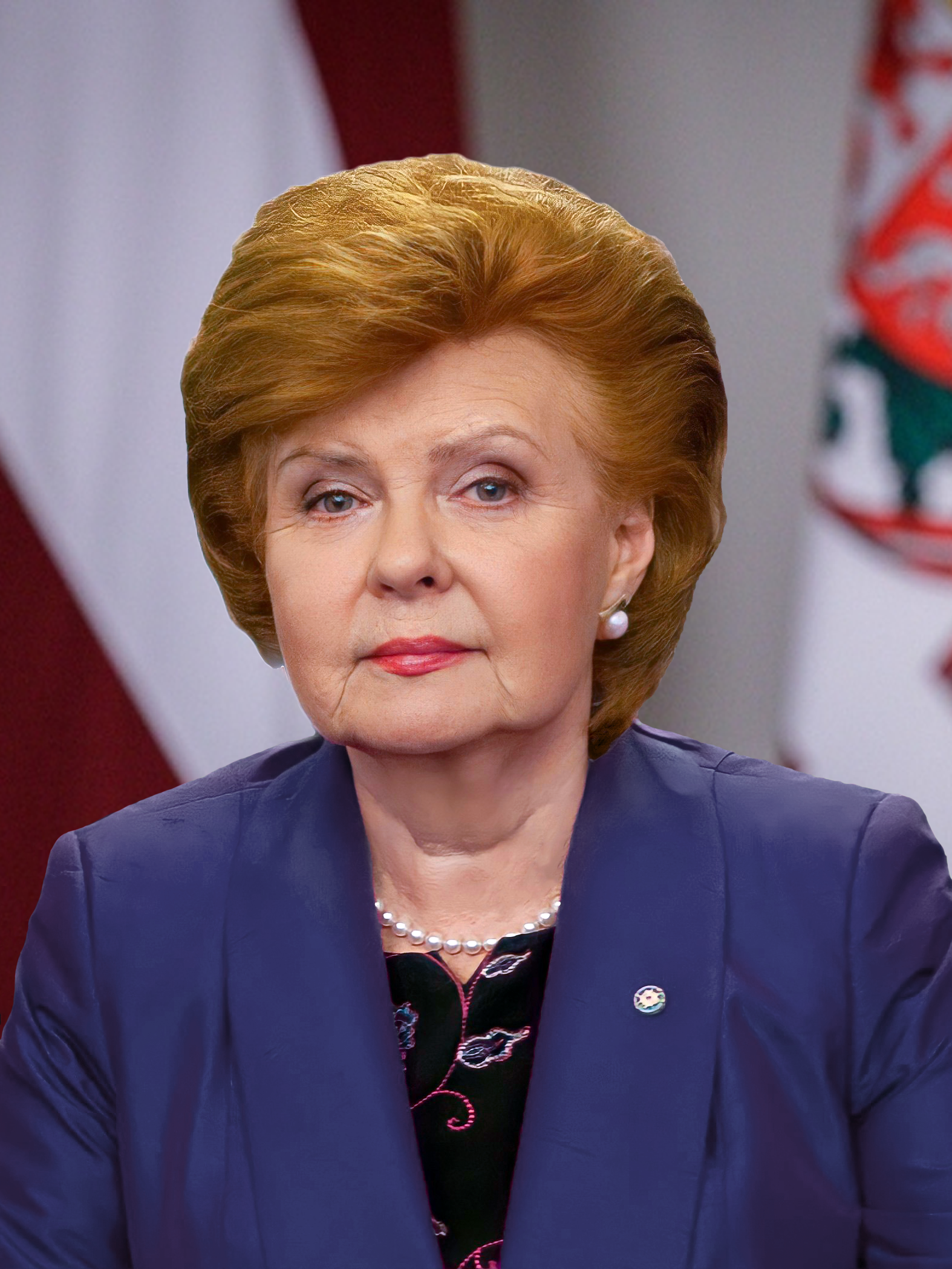
  Dr. Vaira Vike-Freiberga
  Dr. Vaira Vike-Freiberga, Latvian politician who served as the sixth President of Latvia from 1999 to 2007. She is the first woman to hold the post.
- Portia White, Canadian contralto, known for becoming the first Black Canadian concert singer to achieve international fame.

== Affiliations ==
- The Association of Boarding Schools
- Branksome Hall Asia
- Canadian Accredited Independent Schools
- Coalition of Single Sex Schools of Toronto
- Conference of Independent Schools
- Conference of Independent Schools of Ontario Athletic Association
- G30 Schools
- International Baccalaureate
- International Coalition of Girls' Schools
- National Association of Independent Schools
- Ontario Federation of School Athletics Associations

== See also ==
- Education in Toronto § Private education
- Education in Ontario
- List of secondary schools in Ontario
