= Henry Langley (architect) =

Canadian architect (1836–1907)

- Born: 26 November 1836; Toronto, Ontario, Canada
- Died: 1907 (aged 70–71); Toronto, Ontario, Canada
- Education: Toronto Academy
- Occupation: Architect
- Buildings: Government House

Henry Langley (26 November 1836 – 1907) was a Canadian architect based in Toronto. He was active from 1854 to 1907. Among the first architects born and trained in Canada, he was a founding members of the Royal Canadian Academy of Arts in 1880 and was instrumental in establishing the Ontario Association of Architects in 1889. A conservative in architectural design, he is primarily known for designing numerous churches in the Toronto area, although he designed many secular buildings as well including residential, commercial and public buildings. Langley designed 70 churches throughout Ontario. He was the first chair of the Department of Architecture at the University of Toronto, where he taught during the 1880s and 1890s.

== Life and career ==
Langley's parents, William Langley and Esther Anderson, emigrated to Canada from Ireland in 1832. Born in Toronto, Langley received his general education from the Toronto Academy where part of his training included studying the principles of drawing. In early 1854 he became apprenticed to Scottish architect William Hay, who was a specialist in gothic architecture and worked in Toronto in the 1850s. During his seven-year apprenticeship, he worked with Hay on some of the oldest buildings and structures in Toronto, including St. Basil's Church, Toronto (1855–1856), two of the original buildings at the University of St. Michael's College (1856), Yorkville Town Hall (1859-1860) and the Oaklands at De La Salle College (1860) among other structures.

After Hay's departure from Toronto in 1861, Langley was invited in 1862 by Hay's partner, Thomas Gundry, to become his new partner. He accepted and quickly became the firm's primary designer with Gundry shouldering most of the business side of the company. His most important project during these years was the Government House (1857–1859). In 1869 Gundry died, after which Langley spent the next four years working alone. However, he was assisted during those years by two talented apprentices who later became well known architects in Toronto: Frank Darling and his nephew Edmund Burke.

With the success of the firm, Langley brought in Burke and his brother, the builder Edward Langley, as partners in 1873. The company was in high demand and greatly increased its staff over the next several years. His brother left a decade later and Burke departed in 1894. His son, architect Charles Edward Langley, worked with him during the last 14 years of his life. Charles was the first person to graduate from the Department of Architecture at the University of Toronto on 3 May 1892.

Langley died in Toronto in 1907 and is interred at the Toronto Necropolis. He notably designed that cemetery's chapel.

== Selected works ==
Building	Year Completed	Builder	Style	Source	Location	Image
St. Peter's Anglican Church, Toronto	1864–1866	Gundry and (Henry) Langley	Gothic Revival	15	188 Carlton Street at Sherborne Street, Toronto, Ontario	
St. Michael's Cathedral (Toronto) spire	1865-66	Gundry and (Henry) Langley	Gothic Revival		Toronto, Ontario	
St. Basil's Church, Toronto	1865-66	Gundry and (Henry) Langley	Gothic Revival		Toronto, Ontario	
Government House (Ontario)	1865-6s	Gundry and (Henry) Langley	Gothic Revival		Toronto, Ontario	
St. Stephen-in-the-Fields Anglican Church	1865-6	Henry Langley	Gothic Revival	15	Bathurst Street and College Avenue, Toronto, Ontario	
Metropolitan United Church	1872	Henry Langley	French Gothic Revival	W	Church Street and Queen Street East, Toronto, Ontario	
Toronto Necropolis Chapel	1874	Henry Langley	Gothic Revival	15	Winchester Street and Sumach Street, Toronto, Ontario	
St. Luke's United Church	1874	Henry Langley and Edmund Burke	Romanesque Revival	15	Sherborne Street and Carlton Street, Toronto, Ontario	
St. Andrew's Evangelical Lutheran Church	1878	Henry Langley & Edmund Burke	Gothic Revival	15	383 Jarvis Street, Toronto, Ontario	
Jarvis Street Baptist Church	1878	Henry Langley & Edmund Burke	Gothic Revival		Jarvis Street, Toronto, Ontario	
Hollydene	1879-1880	Henry Langley, Henry Langley and Edmund Burke (Design)	Gothic Revival and High Victorian	3	10 Elm Avenue, Rosedale, Toronto, Ontario	
St. Mark's Anglican Church, Parkdale	1881	Henry Langley, Henry Langley and Edmund Burke (Design)	Gothic Revival		201 Cowan Ave, Toronto, Ontario	
McMaster Hall	1881	Henry Langley, Henry Langley and Edmund Burke (Design)	Romanesque Revival	2	273 Bloor Street West, Toronto, Ontario	
Beverley Street Baptist Church	1886	Henry Langley & Edmund Burke	Gothic Revival	6	72 Beverley Street, Toronto, Ontario	
Trinity-St. Paul's United Church	1887–1889	Henry Langley and Edmund Burke	Gothic Revival	15	Bloor Street west of Spadina Avenue, Toronto, Ontario	

=== Gundry & Langley (1862-1869) ===
- St. Peter's Anglican Church, 1864–65
- Alexander Street Baptist Church, 1866, Demolished
- St. Patrick's Roman Catholic Church, 1869–70, now Our Lady of Mount Carmel Catholic Church

=== Langley (1869-1874) ===
- McGill Square Church, 1870–72, now Metropolitan United Church
- Parliament Street Methodist Church, 1871, Demolished
- Toronto Necropolis Chapel, 1872
- George Street Methodist Church, Peterborough, Ontario, 1874–75

=== Langley, Langley & Burke (1874-1884) ===
Henry Langley, Edward Langley & Edmund Burke

- Jarvis Street Baptist Church, 1874–75
- The Cathedral Church of St. James, spire, 1874
- Sherbourne Street Methodist Church, 1876, now St. Luke's United Church
- St. Andrew's Presbyterian Church, 1877–78, now Grace Toronto Church
- Elm Street Methodist Church, 1877, Demolished
- Little Trinity Anglican Church, addition, 1878
- Hollydene, 1879-1880, now Branksome Hall
- St. Mark's Anglican Church, 1881

=== Langley & Burke (1884-1894) ===
Henry Langley & Edmund Burke

- Beverley Street Baptist Church, 1886, now Chinese Baptist Church
- Trinity Methodist Church, 1887–89, now Trinity St. Paul's United Church
- College Street Baptist Church, 1888, now Portuguese Seventh-Day Adventist Church
- Dunn Avenue Methodist Church, 1889, Demolished
- Walmer Road Baptist Church, 1889–92
- Jarvis Street Baptist Church, 1875

=== Langley & Langley (1894-1907) ===
Henry Langley & Charles Edward Langley

- Memorial Baptist Church, 1897
