= Edmund Burke (architect) =

Canadian architect (1851–1919)

- Born: October 31, 1851; Toronto, Canada West
- Died: January 2, 1919 (aged 68); Toronto, Ontario, Canada
- Education: Upper Canada College
- Occupation: Architect
- Spouse: Minnie Jane Black (m. 1881)
- Projects: Prince Edward Viaduct

Edmund Burke (31 October 1851 – 2 January 1919) was a highly regarded Canadian architect best known for building Toronto's Prince Edward Viaduct or "Bloor Street Viaduct", and Toronto's Robert Simpson store. He served as the vice-president, then President of the Ontario Association of Architects.

== Personal ==
Burke was born in Toronto to parents with ties to building industry:

- His father, William Burke, was a local lumber merchant and builder who founded Burke, Smith & Co in 1850 (ceased operations 1967) that supplied timber to build important structures in Toronto like the Crystal Palace at the Provincial Exhibition Grounds and Gooderham and Worts Distillery))
- His mother, Sarah Langley, was sister to architect Henry Langley, whom Burke later trained with.

He had family ties to Sackville, New Brunswick where several important works survive:

- His wife, the former Minnie Jane Black of Sackville, was related to William Black, founder of Methodism in Nova Scotia.

== Education and training ==
Burke attended Jesse Ketchum Public School, Upper Canada College and Toronto Mechanics' Institute before apprenticing as an architect with his maternal uncle and forming the firm Langley and Burke in 1873.

== Later life and death ==
Most of Burke's professional career was in Toronto and he lived a little more than a decade after his uncle's death. Burke died in the city and is buried at Mount Pleasant Cemetery, where he designed the mortuary chapel in 1893.

== Works ==
Building	Year Completed	Builder	Style	Source	Location	Image
Saint Luke's United Church	1874	Henry Langley and Edmund Burke	Romanesque Revival	15	Sherborne Street and Carlton Street, Toronto, Ontario	
St. Andrew's Evangelical Lutheran Church	1878	Henry Langley & Edmund Burke	Gothic Revival	15	383 Jarvis Street, Toronto, Ontario	
Jarvis Street Baptist Church	1878	Henry Langley & Edmund Burke	Gothic Revival		Jarvis Street, Toronto, Ontario	
McMaster Hall	1881	Henry Langley, Henry Langley and Edmund Burke (Design)	Romanesque Revival	2	273 Bloor Street West, Toronto, Ontario	
Beverley Street Baptist Church	1886	Henry Langley & Edmund Burke	Gothic Revival	6	72 Beverley Street, Toronto, Ontario	
Trinity-St. Paul's United Church	1887–1889	Henry Langley and Edmund Burke	Gothic Revival	15	Bloor Street west of Spadina Avenue, Toronto, Ontario	
Prince Edward Viaduct	1918	Edmund Burke	Gothic Revival		Toronto, Ontario	
Robert Simpson's Department Store Building	1896, 1908, 1923	Edmund Burke	Romanesque Revival, Chicago School		Toronto, Ontario	
Orillia City Hall – rebuild plans for Orillia City Hall built in 1895 by Gordon & Helliwell	1915	Edmund Burke, J.C.B. Horwood and Murray White	Romanesque Revival		20 Mississauga Street West, Orillia, Ontario	
Owens Art Gallery	1895	Edmund Burke	Renaissance Revival		Mount Allison University, 61 York Street, Sackville, New Brunswick, Canada	
Hammond/Black House (home for Fine Arts head John Hammond and now residence to the President of Mount Allison University)	1896	Edmund Burke	Queen Anne Revival-style		Mount Allison University, 82 York Street, Sackville, New Brunswick, Canada	
Walmer Road Baptist Church	1889–1892	Edmund Burke & Henry Langley	Gothic Revival		188 Lowther Street, Toronto, Canada	
Broadmoor Manor	1908	Edmund Burke	Romanesque Revival	15	382 Main Street, Tantramar, New Brunswick. Home of renowned Canadian sculptor Christian Cardell Corbet	
Dr. Charles Paisley House	1903	Edmund Burke	Shingle style		42 York Street, Sackville	
Ogilvie Building	1907	Langley & Burke			Southeast corner of Bay and Wellesley; demolished ca. 1962	

== Biographies ==
- Carr, Angela. Toronto Architect Edmund Burke: Redefining Canadian Architecture. McGill-Queen's University Press, 1995.
