= William McMaster =

Canadian politician

The Honourable William McMaster
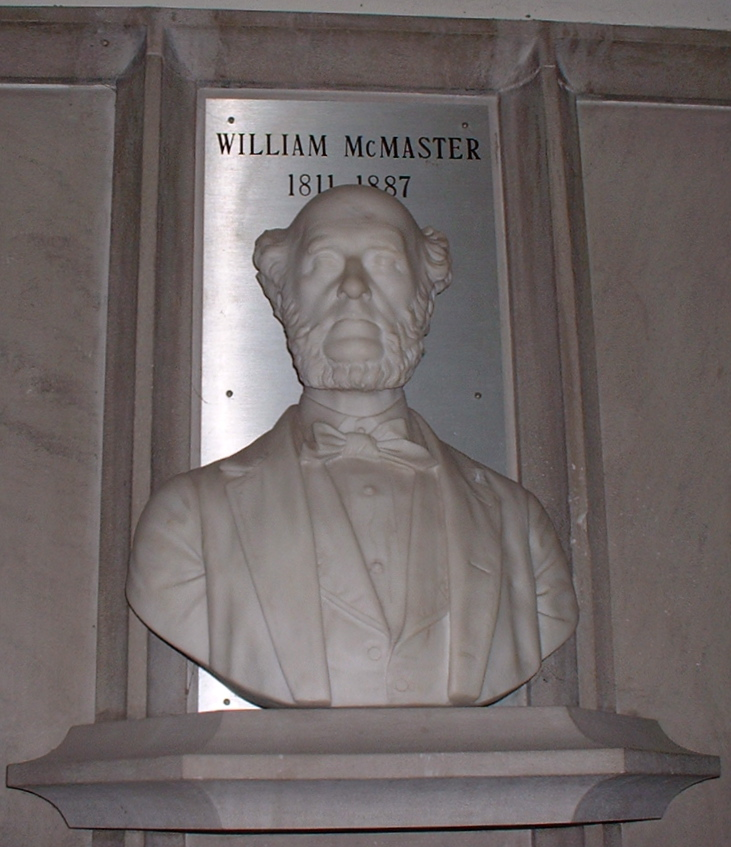
- A bust of William McMaster

Canadian Senator from Ontario
- In office 1867–1887
- Appointed by: Royal Proclamation

Personal details
- Born: 24 December 1811 County Tyrone, Ireland (now Northern Ireland)
- Died: 22 September 1887 (aged 75) Toronto, Ontario, Canada
- Party: Liberal

William McMaster (24 December 1811 – 22 September 1887) was a Canadian banker and politician who was a senator for Midland, Ontario from 1867 to 1887. A director of the Bank of Montreal from 1864 to 1867, he was a driving force behind the creation of the Canadian Bank of Commerce of which he was the founding president from 1867 to his death in 1887.

He was a Liberal. He helped found McMaster University in Toronto (later moved to Hamilton).

== Biography ==
Born in County Tyrone, Northern Ireland, McMaster migrated to York, Upper Canada, (now Toronto) in 1833. He was married for the first time to Mary Henderson (1812–1869) of New York. He married a second time on 18 July 1871, to Susan Fraser (née Moulton), the widow of a James Fraser, an Indian Paymaster for the United States government.

He died in 1887 and is buried in Mount Pleasant Cemetery, Toronto with his first wife Mary. His second wife, Susan, is buried at Mont Royal Cemetery in Montreal.

== Philanthropy ==
McMaster supported a number of causes with large donations. As a member of Bond Street Baptist Church, McMaster helped to finance its building of larger facilities at Jarvis Street Baptist Church. He also helped to finance Beverley Street Baptist Church, which is now Toronto Chinese Baptist Church, and a number of other Baptist churches in the Toronto area as well as the building of Toronto Baptist College in McMaster Hall on Bloor Street, later renamed McMaster University and funded by a large endowment upon his death. Through his wife, financing was also provided for the Hospital for Sick Children in Toronto.

== See also ==
- Elizabeth McMaster
