= Affiliated unions of the Canadian Labour Congress =

The organizations listed below constitute the Canadian Labour Congress, the national federation of trade unions:

== National ==
- Alliance of Canadian Cinema, Television and Radio Artists (ACTRA)
- Association of Canadian Financial Officers (ACFO)
- British Columbia Teachers' Federation (BCTF)
- Canadian Association of Professional Employees (CAPE)
- Canadian Federation of Nurses Unions (CFNU)
  - British Columbia Nurses’ Union
  - Canadian Nursing Students’ Association
  - Manitoba Nurses Union
  - New Brunswick Nurses Union
  - Nova Scotia Nurses' Union
  - Ontario Nurses' Association
  - Prince Edward Island Nurses' Union
  - Registered Nurses’ Union Newfoundland & Labrador
  - Saskatchewan Union of Nurses
  - United Nurses of Alberta
- Canadian Office and Professional Employees Union (COPE)
- Canadian Postmasters and Assistants Association (CPAA)
- Canadian Union of Postal Workers (CUPW)
- Canadian Union of Public Employees (CUPE)
- Congress of Union Retirees of Canada (CURC)
- Directors Guild of Canada (DGC)
- Elementary Teachers' Federation of Ontario (ETFO) (external website)
- FTQ-Construction
- National Union of Public and General Employees (NUPGE)
  - British Columbia General Employees' Union
  - Canadian Union of Brewery and General Workers
  - Health Sciences Association of Alberta
  - Health Sciences Association of British Columbia
  - Health Sciences Association of Saskatchewan
  - Manitoba Association of Health Care Professionals
  - Manitoba Government and General Employees' Union
  - New Brunswick Union of Public and Private Employees
  - Newfoundland and Labrador Association of Public and Private Employees
  - Nova Scotia Government and General Employees Union
  - Ontario Public Service Employees Union
  - Prince Edward Island Union of Public Sector Employees
  - Saskatchewan Government and General Employees' Union
- National Union of the Canadian Association of University Teachers (NUCAUT)
  - Acadia University Faculty Association
  - Brandon University Faculty Association
  - British Columbia Institute of Technology Faculty & Staff Association
  - Brock University Faculty Association
  - Cape Breton University Faculty Association
  - Carleton University Academic Staff Association
  - Concordia University Faculty Association
  - Faculty Association of the University of St. Thomas
  - Federation of Post-Secondary Educators of BC
  - Laurentian University Faculty Association
  - Lecturers’ Union of Memorial University of Newfoundland
  - McMaster University Academic Librarians' Association
  - Memorial University of Newfoundland Faculty Association
  - Mount Allison Faculty Association
  - Mount Saint Vincent University Faculty Association
  - Queen's University Faculty Association
  - Royal Roads University Faculty Association
  - Saint Mary's University Faculty Union
  - St. Thomas More College Faculty Union
  - Trent University Faculty Association
  - University of Manitoba Faculty Association
  - University of Northern British Columbia Faculty Association
  - University of Prince Edward Island Faculty Association
  - University of Saskatchewan Faculty Association
  - University of Winnipeg Faculty Association
  - Windsor University Faculty Association
  - Wilfrid Laurier University Faculty Association
  - York University Faculty Association
- Ontario English Catholic Teachers' Association (OECTA)
- Ontario Secondary School Teachers' Federation (OSSTF)
- Professional Institute of the Public Service of Canada (PIPSC)
- Public Service Alliance of Canada (PSAC)
- Shipyard General Workers' Federation of British Columbia (SGWBC)

== International ==
- Air Line Pilots Association, International (ALPA)
- Amalgamated Transit Union (ATU)
- American Federation of Musicians of the United States and Canada (AFM/CFM)
- Bakery, Confectionery, Tobacco Workers and Grain Millers' International Union (BCTGM)
- Communications Workers of America
  - Communications Workers of America | CANADA (CWA Canada)
- International Alliance of Theatrical Stage Employees, Moving Picture Technicians, Artists and Allied Crafts of the United States, Its Territories and Canada (IATSE)
- International Association of Bridge, Structural, Ornamental and Reinforcing Iron Workers (ABSORIW)
- International Association of Fire Fighters (IAFF)
- International Association of Heat and Frost Insulators and Allied Workers (IAHFIAW)
- International Association of Machinists and Aerospace Workers (IAMAW)
- International Association of Sheet Metal, Air, Rail and Transportation Workers (SMART)
- International Brotherhood of Electrical Workers (IBEW)
- International Brotherhood of Boilermakers, Iron Ship Builders, Blacksmiths, Forgers and Helpers (IBB)
- International Federation of Professional and Technical Engineers (IFPTE)
- International Longshore and Warehouse Union (ILWU)
- International Longshoremen's Association (ILA)
- International Plate Printers, Die Stampers and Engravers' Union of North America (IPPDSEU)
- International Union of Bricklayers and Allied Craftworkers (BAC)
- International Union of Operating Engineers (IUOE)
- International Union, United Automobile, Aerospace and Agricultural Implement Workers of America (UAW) - a.k.a. United Auto Workers
- International Union of Painters and Allied Trades (IUPAT)
- Laborers' International Union of North America (LiUNA)
- Office and Professional Employees International Union (OPEIU)
- Seafarers International Union of North America (SIU)
  - Seafarers' International Union of Canada
- Service Employees International Union (SEIU)
  - Workers United Canada Council
- UNITE HERE
- United Association of Journeymen and Apprentices of the Plumbing and Pipe Fitting Industry of the United States and Canada (UA) - a.k.a. United Association
- United Food and Commercial Workers International Union (UFCW)
- United Mine Workers of America (UMW)
- United Steel, Paper and Forestry, Rubber, Manufacturing, Energy, Allied-Industrial and Service Workers International Union (USW) a.k.a. United Steelworkers

== See also ==
- List of trade unions in Quebec
- List of trade unions in Canada
- List of trade unions in the United States
- Global list of trade unions
- List of unions affiliated with the AFL-CIO
- National trade union centre
- Labour movement
