= Craig A. Evans =

American biblical scholar

- Born: January 21, 1952 (age 74)
- Occupations: Payzant Distinguished Professor of New Testament at Acadia Divinity College in Wolfville; Houston Christian University The Bible Seminary
- Known for: Biblical scholar
- Awards: D.Habil. by the Karoli Gaspard Reformed University in Budapest

Academic background
- Education: Claremont McKenna College, Western Baptist Seminary
- Alma mater: Claremont Graduate University
- Thesis: Isaiah 6:9–10 in Early Jewish and Christian Interpretation (1983)
- Doctoral advisor: William H. Brownlee

Academic work
- Discipline: New Testament studies
- Institutions: McMaster University; Trinity Western University; Acadia Divinity College; Houston Christian University

Craig Alan Evans (born January 21, 1952) is an American biblical scholar and Christian apologist. He has written 70 books and over 600 journal articles and reviews.

== Career ==
He earned his B.A in history and philosophy from Claremont McKenna College, a Master of Divinity from Western Baptist Seminary in Portland, Oregon, and his Master of Arts and Ph.D. in Biblical studies from Claremont Graduate University in southern California.

He is the Distinguished Research Professor at The Bible Seminary in Katy, Texas, where he is also director of Master of Arts in Biblical History and Archaeology (MABHA) and Master of Arts in Biblical Languages and Culture (MABLC) Graduate Programs. Formerly, he was the John Bisagno Distinguished Professor of Christian Origins at Houston Christian University. Prior to Houston Christian (formerly Houston Baptist University), he was Payzant Distinguished Professor of New Testament and director of the graduate program at Acadia Divinity College in Wolfville, Nova Scotia, a visiting assistant professor of religious studies at McMaster University and a professor of biblical studies at Trinity Western University.

Evans was editor of the Bulletin for Biblical Research from 1994 to 2005.

=== Fabricating Jesus ===
Evans published the book Fabricating Jesus: How Modern Scholars Distort the Gospels in 2008. In it, he criticizes current scholarship on the historical Jesus, accusing it of distorting the historical figure of Jesus, creating completely unhistorical images of Jesus of Nazareth. The book is critical of scholars such as Bart D. Ehrman, the Jesus Seminar, Robert Eisenman, Morton Smith, James Tabor, Michael Baigent and Elaine Pagels, while also arguing against the use of New Testament apocrypha, which Evans considers late works with no historical value (Gospel of Thomas, Gospel of Peter, Egerton Gospel, Gospel of Judas and Gospel of Mary) or even modern forgeries (Secret Gospel of Mark).

Another chapter of the book dismisses The Da Vinci Code by the American novelist Dan Brown, which Evans sees as unlike anything that can be supported by actual history.

== Reception ==
The "Advance Praise" section of Craig Evans's book Fabricating Jesus includes endorsements from several prominent scholars of the New Testament, such as James H. Charlesworth, Gerd Theissen, John P. Meier, Darrel L. Bock, Ben Witherington III and James D.G. Dunn.

Dale Allison credited Evans for teaching him many things of importance over the years, and dedicated an essay concerning the contingent eschatology of Jesus to him.

== Works ==
=== Books ===
Evans is the author or editor of over 50 books, some of which are listed below:

- Evans, Craig A. (1992). Noncanonical Writings and New Testament Interpretation. Peabody, MA: Hendrickson Publishers. p. 304. ISBN 978-0-943575-95-7.
- ———; Hagner, Donald A., eds. (1993). Anti-Semitism and Early Christianity: issues of polemic and faith. Fortress Press. p. 304. ISBN 978-0-8006-2748-5.
- ———; Flint, Peter (1997). Eschatology, Messianism, and the Dead Sea. Grand Rapids, MI: Eerdmans Books for Young. p. 167. ISBN 0-8028-4230-5.
- ———; Sanders, James A. (1998). The Function of Scripture in Early Jewish and Christian Tradition. Continuum International. p. 504. ISBN 1-85075-830-1.
- ———; Porter, Stanley E., eds. (2000). Dictionary of New Testament Background. Downers Grove, IL: InterVarsity Press. pp. 1328. ISBN 978-0-8308-1780-1.
- ——— (2000). The Interpretation of Scripture in Early Judaism. Continuum International. ISBN 1-84127-076-8.
- ———; Copan, Paul, eds. (2001). Who Was Jesus?: A Jewish-Christian Dialogue. Louisville, KT: Westminster, John Knox Press. p. 272. ISBN 0-664-22462-8.
- ——— (2003). Jesus and the Ossuaries. Waco, TX: Baylor University Press. pp. 168. ISBN 0-918954-88-6.
- ——— (2005). Ancient Texts For New Testament Studies: A Guide To The Background Literature. Peabody, MA: Hendrickson Publishers. pp. 539. ISBN 978-1-56563-409-1.
- ———; Collins, John J., eds. (2006). Christian Beginnings and the Dead Sea Scrolls. Grand Rapids, MI: Baker Academic. pp. 144. ISBN 978-0-8010-2837-3.
- ——— (2006). Fabricating Jesus: How Modern Scholars Distort the Gospels. Downers Grove, IL: InterVarsity Press. p. 290. ISBN 0-8308-3318-8.
- ———; Wright, N. T. (2009). Jesus, the Final Days: What Really Happened. Louisville, KT: Westminster, John Knox Press. pp. 116. ISBN 978-0664233594.
- ——— (2012). Jesus and His World: The Archaeological Evidence. Louisville, KT: Westminster, John Knox Press. p. 192. ISBN 978-0664234133.
- ——— (2014). From Jesus to the Church: The First Christian Generation. Louisville, KT: Westminster, John Knox Press. p. 188. ISBN 978-0664239053.
- ———; Beverley, James A. (2015). Getting Jesus Right: How Muslims get Jesus and Islam Wrong. Pickering, ON, Canada: Castle Quay Books. p. 352. ISBN 978-1927355459.
- ——— (2015). God Speaks: What He Says, What He Means. Franklin, TN: Worthy Publishing. p. 272. ISBN 978-1617954818.
- ———; Johnston, Jeremiah (2015). Jesus and the Jihadis: Confronting the Rage of Isis: the Theology Driving the Ideology. Peabody, MA: Hendrickson Publishers. p. 160. ISBN 978-0768408997.
- ——— (2015). Jesus and the Remains of His Day: Studies in Jesus and the Evidence of Material Culture. Shippensburg, PA: Destiny Image Publishers. p. 400. ISBN 978-1619707054.
- ——— (2020). Jesus and the Manuscripts: What We Can Learn from the Oldest Texts. Peabody, MA: Hendrickson Publishers. p. 575. ISBN 978-1-68307-360-4

=== Articles ===
- ——— (1988). "On the Unity and Parallel Structure of Isaiah". Vetus Testamentum. 38 (2): 129–147. doi:10.1163/156853388X00346.
- ——— (2006). "Assessing Progress in the Third Quest of the Historical Jesus". Journal for the Study of the Historical Jesus. 4 (1): 35–54. doi:10.1177/1476869006061777.
- ——— (2015). "How Long Were Late Antique Books in Use? Possible Implications for New Testament Textual Criticism". Bulletin for Biblical Research. 25 (1): 23–37. doi:10.2307/26371610. JSTOR 26371610. S2CID 248465366.
