= Acadia University =

Public university in Wolfville, Nova Scotia, Canada

- Coat of Arms
- Former names: Queen's College (1838–1841); Acadia College (1841–1891)
- Motto: In pulvere vinces (Latin)
- Motto in English: "By effort (lit. 'in dust'), you will conquer"
- Type: Public university
- Established: 1838; 188 years ago
- Religious affiliation: Currently non-denominational; initially founded by Baptists
- Academic affiliations: AUCC, IAU, CUSID, CBIE, CUP, Maple League of Universities
- Endowment: $144.6 million (2025)
- Chancellor: Nancy McCain
- President: Jeff Hennessy
- Administrative staff: 211 full-time, 37 part-time (as of 2008)
- Students: 4,282 (Fall 2026)
- Undergraduates: 3,799
- Postgraduates: 483
- Location: Wolfville, Nova Scotia, Canada; 45°05′16″N 64°21′58″W
- Campus: 250 acres (101 ha)
- Tagline: Like Nowhere Else
Colours
Red and Blue
- Nickname: Axemen and Axewomen
- Sporting affiliations: U Sports – AUS
- Website: acadiau.ca

Acadia University is a public, predominantly undergraduate university located in Wolfville, Nova Scotia, Canada, with some graduate programs at the master's level and one at the doctoral level. The enabling legislation consists of the Acadia University Act and the Amended Acadia University Act 2000.

The Wolfville Campus houses Acadia University Archives and the Acadia University Art Gallery. Acadia offers over 200 degree combinations in the faculties of arts, pure and applied science, professional studies, and theology. The student-faculty ratio is 15:1 and the average class size is 28. Open Acadia offers correspondence and distance education courses. Acadia has botanical gardens known as the Harriet Irving Gardens. These gardens feature plants and trees native to the Acadian forest region.

== History ==
Aerial view of campus

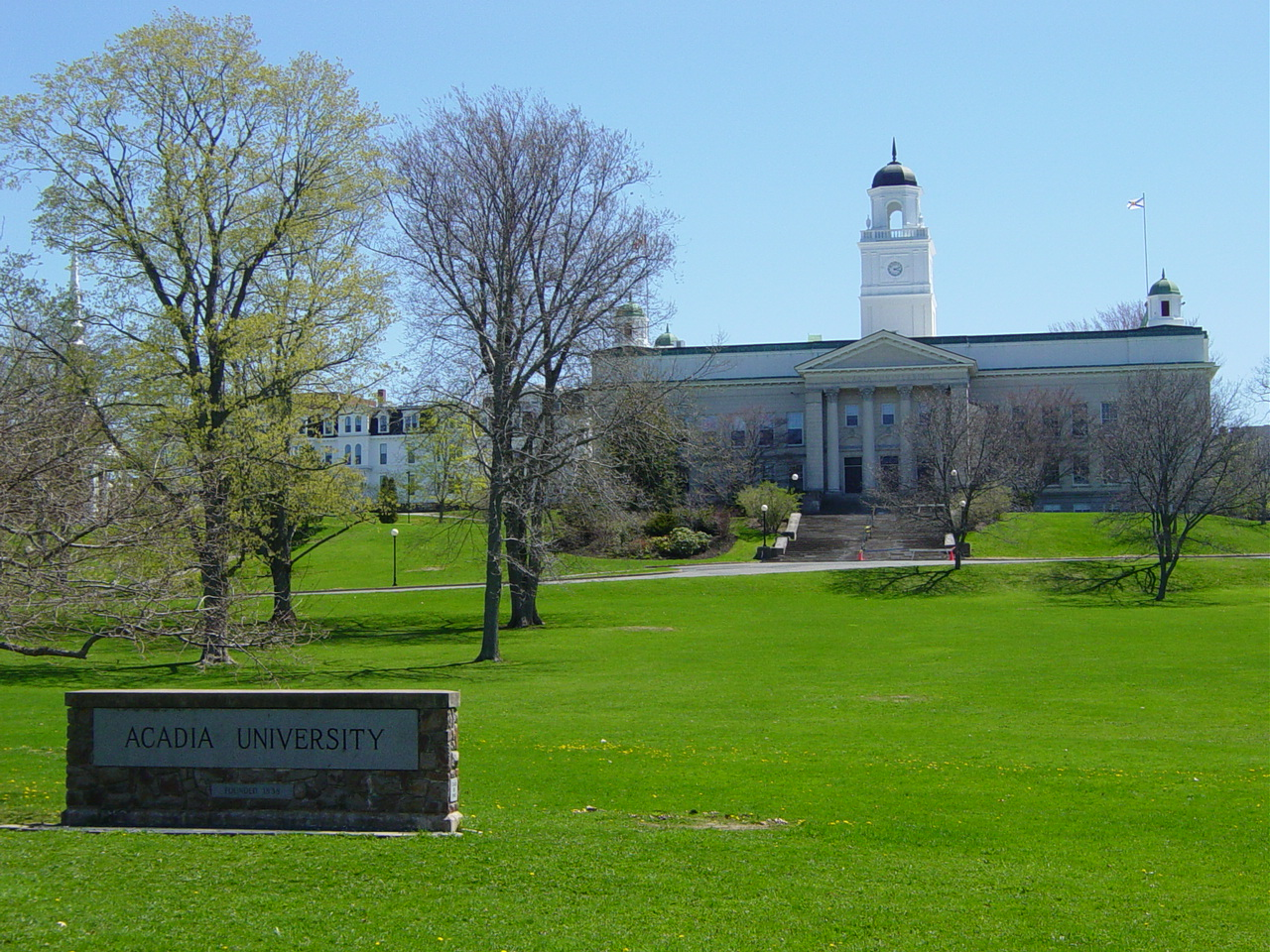
University Hall at Acadia University

Acadia began as an extension of Horton Academy in 1828, which was founded in Horton, Nova Scotia, by Baptists from Nova Scotia and Queen's College in 1838, who will be gathered into the Canadian Baptists of Atlantic Canada (Canadian Baptist Ministries). It was designed to prepare men for the ministry and to supply education for lay members.

In 1838, the Nova Scotia Baptist Education Society founded Queen's College (named for Queen Victoria). The college began with 21 students in January 1839. The name "Queen's College" was denied to the Baptist school, so it was renamed "Acadia College" in 1841, in reference to the history of the area as an Acadian settlement. Acadia College awarded its first degrees in 1843 and became Acadia University in 1891, established by the Acadia University Act.

The Granville Street Baptist Church (now First Baptist Church Halifax) has played a supporting role throughout its history. Many individuals who have made significant contributions to Acadia University, including the first president John Pryor, were members of the First Baptist Church Halifax congregation.

In 1851, the power of appointing governors was transferred from the Nova Scotia Baptist Education Society to the Baptist Convention of the Maritime Provinces.

Charles Osborne Wickenden, an architect, and J.C. Dumaresq designed the Central Building, Acadia College, 1878–79.

Clara Belle Marshall, from Mount Hanley, Nova Scotia, became the first woman to graduate from Acadia University in 1879.

In 1891, there were changes in the Act of Incorporation.

Andrew R. Cobb designed several campus buildings including: Raynor Hall Residence, 1916; and Horton House, designed by Cobb in the Georgian style, and built by James Reid of Yarmouth, Nova Scotia, which was opened in 1915 as Horton Academy. Today, Horton Hall is the home of the Department of Psychology and Research and Graduate Studies. In 1967 Emmerson Hall was converted to classrooms and offices for the School of Education. It is a registered Heritage Property.

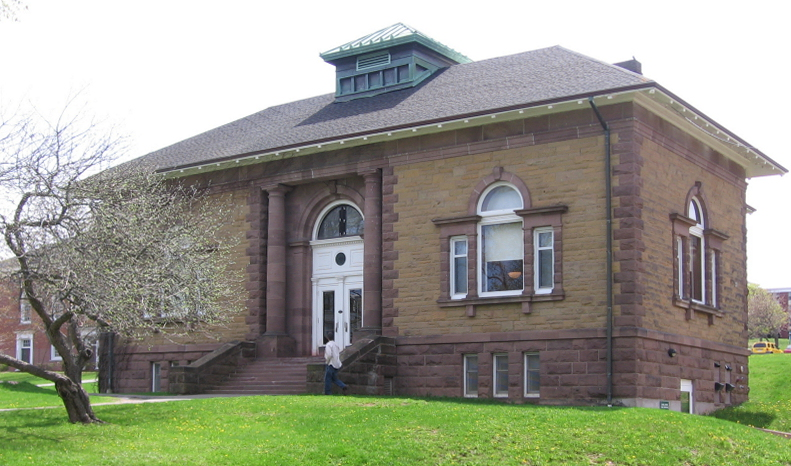
Emmerson Hall, Acadia University, was originally built 1913 as Emerson Memorial Library and shows strong Beaux Arts influences. It was erected to honour the memory of the Reverend R. H. Emmerson, father of the former premier of New Brunswick, H. R. Emmerson.

Unveiled on 16 August 1963, a wooden and metal organ in Manning Chapel, Acadia University, is dedicated to Acadia University's war dead of the First and Second World Wars and the Korean War. A book of remembrance in Manning Chapel, Acadia University was unveiled on 1 March 1998 through the efforts of the Wolfville Historical Society.

In 1966, it terminated its affiliation with the Canadian Baptists of Atlantic Canada (Canadian Baptist Ministries). The denomination maintains nine seats on the university's Board of Governors.

Acadia is a laureate of Washington's Smithsonian Institution and a part of the permanent research collection of the National Museum of American History. Acadia is also the only Canadian university selected for inclusion in the Education and Academia category of the Computerworld Smithsonian Award.

=== Faculty strikes ===
Acadia University's Board of Governors and members of the Acadia University Faculty Association (AUFA) ratified the 17th Collective Agreement on 25 September 2025, covering the period from 1 July 2025 to 30 June 2028. The faculty of Acadia University have been on strike three times in the history of the institution. The first was 23 February to 12 March 2004. The second was 15 October to 5 November 2007. The second strike was resolved after the province's labour minister, Mark Parent, appointed a mediator, on 1 November, to facilitate an agreement. The third strike began on 1 February 2022 and ended 1 March 2022 with both sides agreeing to binding arbitration.

=== Student Strike ===
In March 2026 Acadia became the second student union in Nova Scotia to vote yes to the one week provincial student strike proposed by the Canadian Federation of Students NS. Together with students from NSCAD and later Saint Mary's, Dalhousie, and Kings, this was the first student strike in English Canada (with Quebec having had the first in 2012). The main demands outlined by Student Strike NS were divestment from weapons and fossil fuel, and affordable tuition, though the Acadia student union chose to remove divestment from their mandate. The strike lasted for one week from March 15-21 with intentions for future actions.

== Academics ==
University rankings

World rankings

Canadian rankings
- Maclean's Undergraduate: 5
- Maclean's Reputation: 30

=== Rankings ===
In Maclean's 2023 Guide to Canadian Universities, Acadia was ranked fifth in the publication's "primarily undergraduate" Canadian university category, tied with Bishop's University. In the same year, the publication ranked Acadia 33rd in Maclean's reputation survey.

=== Faculties ===
Acadia is organized into four faculties: Arts, Pure & Applied Science, Professional Studies and Theology. Each faculty is further divided into departments and schools specialized in areas of teaching and research.

== Research ==
Acadia has over 15 research centres and 6 research chairs. Undergraduate students have the opportunity to participate in many research opportunities in a small university setting.

The Division of Research & Graduate Studies is separate from the faculties and oversees graduate students as well as Acadia's research programs.

Acadia's research programs explore coastal environments, ethno-cultural diversity, social justice, environmental monitoring and climate change, organizational relationships, data mining, the impact of digital technologies, and lifestyle choices contributing to health and wellness. Acadia's research centres include the Tidal Energy Institute, the Acadia Institute for Data Analytics, and the Beaubassin Field Station. Applied research opportunities include research with local wineries and grape growers, alternative insect control techniques and technologies.

== Innovation ==
=== Acadia Advantage ===
In 1996, Acadia University introduced a new initiative. Named the Acadia Advantage, it integrated the use of notebook computers into the undergraduate curriculum and featured innovations in teaching. By 2000, all full-time, undergraduate Acadia students were taking part in the initiative. The initiative went beyond leasing notebook computers to students during the academic year, and included training, user support and the use of course-specific applications at Acadia.

In addition, Acadia University received the Pioneer Award for Ubiquitous Computing. In 2001, it achieved high rankings in the annual Maclean's University Rankings, including Best Overall for Primarily Undergraduate University in their opinion survey, and it received the Canadian Information Productivity Award in 1997 as the first university in Canada to fully utilize information technology in the undergraduate curriculum.

In September 2008, Acadia moved to a student-owned notebook computer version of the Acadia Advantage, now named Acadia Advantage 2.0.

Acadia is a laureate of Washington's Smithsonian Institution and a part of the permanent research collection of the National Museum of American History. It is the only Canadian university selected for inclusion in the Education and Academia category of the Computerworld Smithsonian Award.

The new Agri-Technology Access Centre in the Innovation Pavilion provides companies and industry organizations with access to specialized technology, lab space, subject-matter expertise and commercialization support services. It also enables Acadia to advance its applied research strength in a priority sector – agriculture – and expand its technology transfer and commercialization activities. The Science Complex renewal project was supported by an investment of $15.98 million by the Federal and Provincial governments.

== Athletics ==
Acadia's sports teams are called the "Axemen and Axewomen". They participate in the Atlantic University Sports conference of U Sports.

Men's and women's varsity teams that have won more conference and national championships than any other institution in Atlantic University Sport. Routinely, more than one-third of Acadia's varsity athletes also achieve Academic All-Canadian designation through Canadian Interuniversity Sport by maintaining a minimum average of 80 per cent.

== Fight song ==
Notable among a number of songs commonly played and sung at various events such as commencement, convocation, and athletic games are: Stand Up and Cheer, the Acadia University fight song. According to 'Songs of Acadia College' (Wolfville, NS 1902–3, 1907), the songs include: 'Acadia Centennial Song' (1938); 'The Acadia Clan Song'; 'Alma Mater - Acadia;' 'Alma Mater Acadia' (1938) and 'Alma Mater Song.'

== Symbols ==
In 1974, Acadia was granted a coat of arms designed by the College of Arms in London, England. The coat of arms is two-tone, with the school's official colours, garnet and blue, on the shield. The axes represent the school's origins in a rural setting, and the determination of its founders who cleared the land and built the school on donated items and labour. The open books represent the intellectual pursuits of a university, and the wolves heads are a whimsical representation of the university's location in Wolfville. "In pulvere vinces" (In dust you conquer) is the motto.

The university seal depicts the Greek goddess of wisdom Athena in front of the first college hall.

The university also uses a stylized "A" as a logo for its sports teams.

The Acadia University alma mater is set to the tune of "Annie Lisle". The lyrics are:

Far above the dykes of Fundy
And its basin blue
Stands our noble alma mater
Glorious to view

Lift the chorus
Speed it onward
Sing it loud and free
Hail to thee our alma mater
Acadia, hail to thee

Far above the busy highway
And the sleepy town
Raised against the arch of heaven
Looks she proudly down

== Historic buildings ==
Seminary House, also known as just "Sem", is a Second Empire style-building constructed in 1878 as a home for women attending the university. It was designated a National Historic Site of Canada in 1997 as Canada's oldest facility associated with the higher education of women. The building now serves as a co-ed residence, and Whitman House on campus now serves as the women's only residence.

Carnegie Hall, built in 1909, is a large, two-storey, Neo-classical brick building. It was designated under the provincial Heritage Property Act in 1989 as its construction in 1909 signified Acadia's evolution from classical college to liberal university.

The War Memorial House (more generally known as Barrax or Rax), which is a residence, and War Memorial Gymnasium are landmark buildings on the campus of Acadia University. The Memorial Hall and Gymnasium honours students who had enlisted and died in the First World War, and in the Second World War. Two granite shafts, which are part of the War Memorial Gymnasium complex at Acadia University, are dedicated to the university's war dead. The War Memorial House is dedicated to the war dead from Acadia University during the Second World War.

== Student life ==
At Acadia University, students have access to the Student Union Building which serves as a hub for students and houses many Student Union organizations. The building houses The Axe Lounge, a convenience store, an information desk, two food outlets, and the Sexual Health Resource Centre. The university press, The Athenaeum is a member of CUP.

=== Student government ===
All students are represented by the Acadia Students' Union.

=== Residences ===
Approximately 1500 students live on-campus in 11 residences:

- Chase Court
- Chipman House
- Christofor Hall
- Crowell Tower (13 Story High-rise)
- 55 University Avenue (formerly known as Cutten House, it was temporarily renamed in late 2024 until a new name could be decided. Cutten House was named in honour of a university president who had been in support of segregation and eugenics)
- Dennis House - First floor houses student health services
- Eaton House
- Roy Jodrey Hall
- Seminary House - Also houses the School of Education in lower level
- War Memorial (Barrax) House
- Whitman House (Tully) - All female residence
- Willett House (former residence)

== People ==
=== List of presidents and vice chancellors ===
- John Pryor, 1846–1850
- John Cramp, 1851–1853 (and 1856–1869)
- Edmund Crawley, 1853–1856
- John Cramp, 1856–1869
- Artemas Wyman Sawyer, 1869–1896
- Thomas Trotter, 1897–1906
- W.B. Hutchinson, 1907–1909
- George Barton Cutten, 1910–1922
- Frederic Patterson, 1923–1948
- Watson Kirkconnell, 1948–1964
- James Beveridge, 1964–1978
- Allan Sinclair, 1978–1981
- James Perkin, 1981–1993
- Kelvin Ogilvie, 1993–2004
- Gail Dinter-Gottlieb, 2004–2008
- Tom Herman, 2008–2009 (acting)
- Ray Ivany, 2009–2017
- Peter J Ricketts, 2017–2023
- Jeffrey J Hennessy, 2023–present

=== List of chancellors ===
- Alex Colville, 1981–1991
- William Feindel, 1991–1996
- Arthur Irving, 1996–2010
- Libby Burnham, 2011–2018
- Bruce Galloway, 2018–2024
- Nancy McCain, 2024–present

=== Notable alumni ===
- Edgar Archibald, scientist and politician
- Norman Atkins, Canadian senator
- Solomon Adeniyi Babalola - Nigerian Baptist missionary/evangelist, Church Pastor, Church Administrator, Denominational Leader, and Theological Educator
- Ron Barkhouse, MLA for Lunenburg East (Horton Academy)
- Gordon Lockhart Bennett, Lieutenant-Governor of Prince Edward Island
- Arthur Bourns, President of McMaster University
- Libby Burnham, lawyer, Chancellor of Acadia University
- Bob Cameron, football player
- Dalton Camp, journalist, politician and political strategist
- M. Elizabeth Cannon, University of Calgary President & Vice-Chancellor
- Lillian Chase, physician
- Adam Vincent Clarke, composer
- Paul Corkum, physicist and F.R.S.
- John Wallace de Beque Farris, Canadian senator
- Mark Day, actor
- Michael Dick, CBC-TV journalist
- Charles Aubrey Eaton (1868–1953), clergyman and politician
- William Feindel, neurosurgeon
- Dale Frail, astronomer
- Rob Ramsay, actor
- Alexandra Fuller, writer
- Gary Graham, musician, choral conductor
- Matthew Green, Member of Parliament
- Milton Fowler Gregg, VC laureate, politician
- Robbie Harrison, Nova Scotian politician and educator
- Richard Hatfield, Premier of New Brunswick
- Charles Brenton Huggins, Nobel Laureate
- Kenneth Colin Irving, industrialist
- Robert Irving, industrialist
- Ron James, comedian
- Lorie Kane, LPGA golfer
- Gerald Keddy, Member of Parliament
- Joanne Kelly, actress
- Mary Knickle, composer, lyricist, musician
- Kenneth Komoski, educator
- David H. Levy, astronomer
- Peter MacKay, lawyer, Canadian Minister of National Defence
- Henry Poole MacKeen, Lieutenant-Governor of Nova Scotia
- Paul Masotti, football player
- Harrison McCain, industrialist
- Donald Oliver, Canadian senator
- Rev. William Pearly Oliver, black minister and educator
- Henry Nicholas Paint (1830–1921), member of Parliament, merchant, landowner,
- Freeman Patterson, photographer, writer
- Robert Pope, visual artist author
- Keith R. Porter, cell biologist
- Heather Rankin, singer-songwriter, member of The Rankin Family
- Perry F. Rockwood, radio evangelist
- Erin Roger, scientist
- Jacob Gould Schurman, President of Cornell University
- Roger Tomlinson (1933–2014), geographer and "The Father of GIS"
- Rev. William A. White, black minister and missionary
- Lance Woolaver, playwright

== See also ==
- Acadia Divinity College
- Canadian government scientific research organizations
- Canadian industrial research and development organizations
- Canadian Interuniversity Sport
- Canadian university scientific research organizations
- Higher education in Nova Scotia
- List of universities in Nova Scotia
- List of National Historic Sites of Canada in Nova Scotia
- Shad (Summer Program)
