= CURC =

CURC may refer to:

- Cambridge University Railway Club, the first student railway enthusiast club in the world
- Congress of Union Retirees of Canada, a labour organization
