= Crandall University =

Christian liberal arts university in Canada

Coordinates: 46°8′2.15″N 64°51′42.86″W

- Motto: Cristus Praeeminens
- Motto in English: Christ First
- Type: Private
- Established: 1949
- Founder: Canadian Baptists of Atlantic Canada
- Affiliations: Convention of Atlantic Baptist Churches; Acadia Divinity College; CCCU; Evangelical Fellowship of Canada, CUSID,
- Religious affiliation: Baptist
- Chancellor: Donald Simmonds
- President: Robert Knowles (Interim)
- Provost: Jon Ohlhauser
- Faculty: 84
- Administrative staff: 79
- Students: 1,400+
- Location: Moncton, New Brunswick, Canada
- Campus: Urban
- Language: English
- Sports teams: Chargers
- Colours: Blue and Gold
- Mascot: Charlie the Charger
- Website: www.crandallu.ca

Crandall University is a Christian liberal arts university located in Moncton, New Brunswick, Canada. It is owned and operated by the Canadian Baptists of Atlantic Canada (CBAC), which appoints a majority of its board of governors.

== History ==
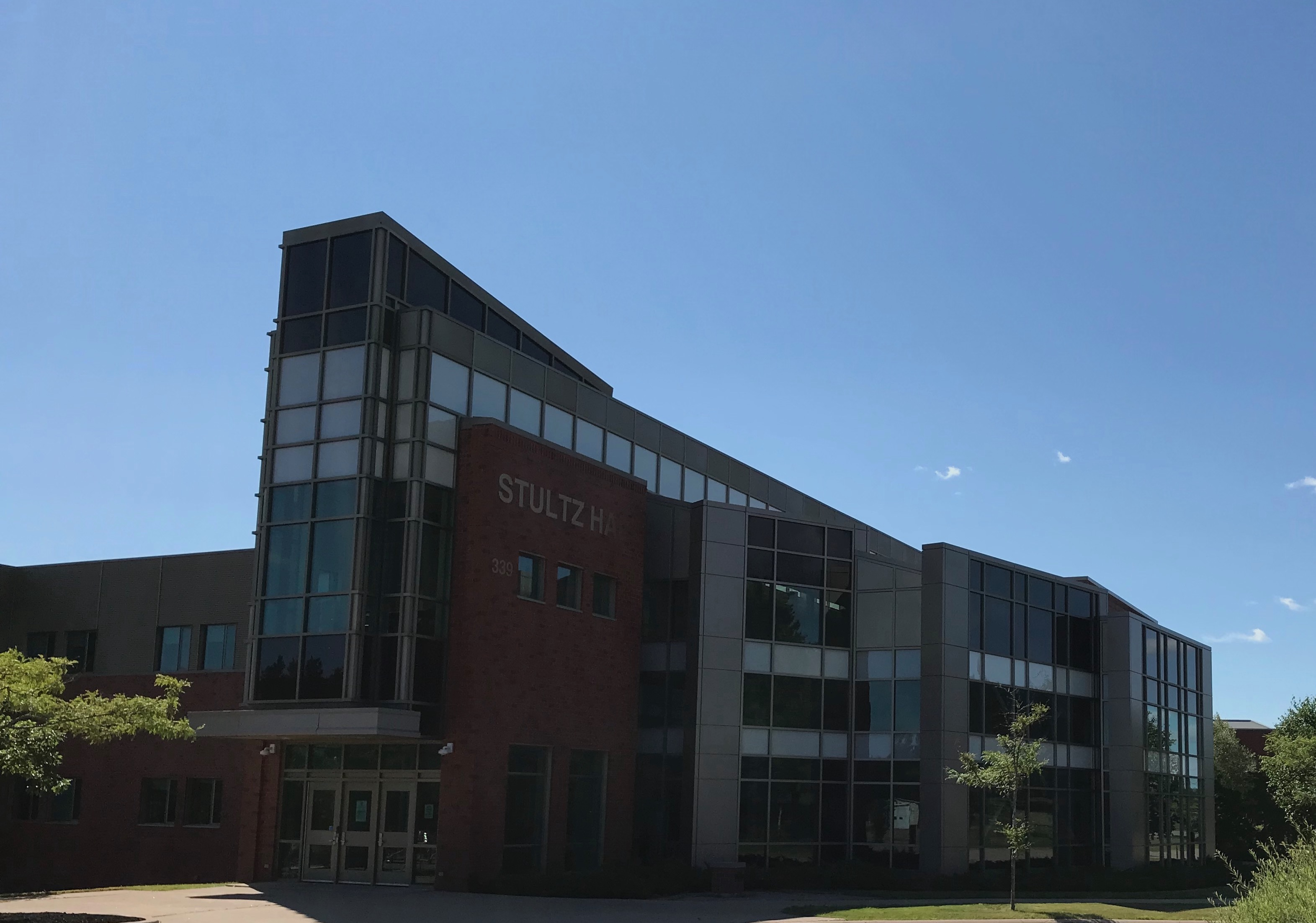
Stultz Hall

Crandall University was founded in 1949 under the name United Baptist Bible Training School (UBBTS), and served as both a secondary school and a Bible school by the Canadian Baptists of Atlantic Canada. Over two decades, the focus of the school gradually shifted toward post-secondary programs. In 1968, UBBTS became a Bible and junior Christian liberal arts college, and in 1970 the name was changed to Atlantic Baptist College (ABC). A sustained campaign to expand the school's faculty and improve the level of education resulted in ABC being able to grant full Bachelor of Arts degrees in 1983. Its campus at this time was located along the Salisbury Road, west of Moncton's central business district.

The institution moved to a new campus built on the Gorge Road, north of the central business district, in 1996. The name was changed to Atlantic Baptist University (ABU), a reflection of expanded student enrolment and academic accreditation. In 2003, the ABU sports teams adopted the name The Blue Tide. The institution was the first, and thus far only, English-language university in Moncton. The Atlantic Baptist University Act was passed by the Legislative Assembly of New Brunswick in 2008.

On August 21, 2009, it was announced that the institution had changed its name to Crandall University in honour of Rev. Joseph Crandall, a pioneering Baptist minister in the maritime region. In conjunction with the university name change, Crandall Athletics took on a new identity as "The Crandall Chargers."

The university’s first chancellor was Ralph Richardson, who served in the role from 2001 to 2009. Richardson graduated from UBBTS in 1964, began teaching at the college in 1971, and proceeded to take on greater leadership roles until eventually becoming president in 1986, which he served as until stepping down in 2000. Richardson passed away in 2022.

== Academics ==
As of 2025, Crandall University offers 6 undergraduate degree programs, 3 graduate degree programs, and 5 certificate programs. Through its partnership with Acadia Divinity College (which is also owned and operated by Canadian Baptists of Atlantic Canada), students can also enrol in the Bachelor of Theology program concurrent with a Crandall degree.

As a Christian university, students are required to complete courses in religious studies in order to earn a degree. The number of courses required varies by program, with the Bachelor of Education requiring 2 courses (6 credit hours), the Bachelor of Business Administration requiring 4 courses (12 credit hours), and the Bachelor of Arts, Bachelor of Science, and Bachelor of Arts & Science programs each requiring 6 courses (18 credit hours). Faculty are required to have a belief in Christ, are expected to share their faith in the classroom, and are encouraged to pray before their classes and when counselling students. The university’s requiring of a statement of faith as a condition of employment has raised concerns of its commitment to academic freedom.

In response to Immigration, Refugees and Citizenship Canada’s decision to limit the number of undergraduate international students in Canada beginning in 2024, Crandall University no longer accepts international students into its Bachelor of Education, Bachelor of Technical Education, Bachelor of Arts in Organizational Management, or Bachelor of Organizational Management programs.

== Faculty unionization effort ==
In 2025, the Association of Christian Teachers and Scholars (ACTS), CLAC Local 601 applied to unionize full-time and tenure-track faculty at Crandall University. The University opposed the application, arguing that the association did not meet the definition of a trade union under the province's Industrial Relations Act, and that the association should be barred from making any further application for 10-months.

In a preliminary decision released November 7, 2025, the New Brunswick Labour and Employment Board rejected the university’s argument that the Industrial Relations Act requires a trade union to be founded only by employees working within the province, and declined to impose the time bar requested by the university. The Board found that ACTS, CLAC Local 601 had conditionally established trade union status, while requiring further evidence at a subsequent hearing regarding whether certain founding participants met constitutional requirements.

== Controversies ==
=== Academic freedom and CAUT investigation ===
Following concerns being brought to its attention, in 2009 the Canadian Association of University Teachers (CAUT) authorized an ad hoc investigatory committee to open an investigation to determine whether Crandall University might be denying academic freedom to some of its academic staff by requiring a statement of faith as a condition of initial and/or continuing employment. The investigation included an interview with the university’s president, vice-president of academic affairs, and president of the faculty association, and concluded in 2010. The report found that “while the university has a statement on academic freedom, it is significantly inconsistent with that of the CAUT and the majority of universities across the western world, and assurances that free enquiry is still possible within its constraints are unconvincing.” The committee therefore recommended that Crandall University "be placed on the list of institutions 'found to have imposed a requirement of a commitment to a particular ideology or statement of faith as a condition of employment.'" As of 2025, Crandall University is one of five universities on that list.

=== Anti-gay hiring policy ===
In 2012, Crandall University came under public scrutiny for receiving municipal funds while refusing to hire non-celibate LGBTQ people. That policy, although regarded by the university as scriptural and consistent with its denominational tradition, was characterized as anti-gay. That same year, the Crandall Student Association publicly broke with the university's administration over the policy, with the student president at the time telling the CBC, "The Christian faith does say do not judge others. And the Christian faith is all about love. So I feel that this policy – to me – doesn't seem like it's following those specific guidelines." In 2013, a year after the controversy erupted, the university opted to not apply for $150,000 in public funding that it had received annually. The university president also issued an apology, stating: "We wish to apologize for anything that Crandall University might possibly have communicated in the past that may have seemed unloving or disrespectful in any way toward any individual or groups."

=== Withholding of residence damage deposits ===
In 2013, several Crandall University graduates spoke out about a history of unfair withholding of residence damage deposits. Students claimed that the university would not inform students of expectations of upkeep or reasons for which fines could be issued until after students had already signed leases, and would subsequently deduct fines from their student accounts without warning or explanation. The university did not deny the claims, but clarified that students can make a request to know what they have been fined for.

=== Termination of John G. Stackhouse Jr. and subsequent lawsuits ===
In 2023, Crandall University engaged Pink Larkin law firm to conduct an independent investigation following anonymous accusations posted on social media of inappropriate behaviour by one or multiple unnamed university employees. The investigation resulted in the termination of John G. Stackhouse Jr., a Religious Studies professor and the Dean of Faculty Development. Over 120 students, staff, faculty, and alumni signed an open letter criticizing the university for its failure to act on prior complaints and for its policies that discouraged and presented barriers for students to report sexual harassment on campus. The university’s leadership has faced ongoing criticism for its failure to act on prior complaints about the professor, its handling of the investigation, and its stance on sexual harassment and misconduct, which has resulted in multiple lawsuits.

In December 2023, Stackhouse sued Crandall University in the Court of King's Bench of New Brunswick, claiming wrongful termination and damages to his reputation. Stackhouse’s wife, Sarah-Jane Britton, later joined the lawsuit, also claiming damages to reputation. In its response, the university denies any and all liability to Stackhouse or his wife and requests the court dismiss their claim with costs. In March 2025, Stackhouse and Britton filed an affidavit challenging the independence and legitimacy of the investigation, claiming among other things that Stackhouse was never informed of specific allegations made against him during the investigation process, and that university president Bruce G. Fawcett manipulated the investigation process and collaborated extensively with the investigator, including through interviewing witnesses, editing the final investigation report, and co-writing its summary. Stackhouse and Britton further claim that on multiple occasions the investigator suggested closing the investigation due to a lack of evidence, but that the president insisted it continue. The allegations have not been proven in court.

In March 2024, Crandall University sued AIG Insurance Company of Canada, claiming that, as a result of an insurance policy purchased by the university, the insurance company was responsible for all costs associated with defending the university in the action commenced by Stackhouse. The insurance policy provided coverage for wrongful acts made by the university’s directors and officers (including for wrongful termination of employees), but included a sexual misconduct exclusion, which excluded coverage for matters in any way involving sexual misconduct. Due to the exclusion, AIG rejected the university’s claim and declined to pay costs associated with the action commenced by Stackhouse. The university argued that the exclusion was ambiguous and that sexual harassment is not a form of sexual misconduct under the policy. The Court of King's Bench of New Brunswick dismissed the university’s application, determining that the plain and ordinary meaning of sexual misconduct includes sexual harassment, and ordered the university to pay $3,000 in costs plus disbursements to AIG. The university appealed to the Court of Appeal of New Brunswick, which dismissed the appeal in a unanimous decision and ordered the university to pay an additional $2,500 in costs to AIG.

=== Sexual assault lawsuit ===
In March 2026, Katherine Hamilton, a former student, sued both Crandall University and Chester “Chet” MacPhail, the former Director of the Youth Leadership Certificate program. The former student claims that MacPhail sexually assaulted her while a student in 2014, at locations both on campus and at Cherryfield Baptist Church, where MacPhail also served as a pastor. The former student also claims that the university acted negligently by failing to create a safe environment for students; failing to adhere to policies and procedures for investigating and responding to sexual abuse/misconduct complaints; failing to protect her from MacPhail during the complaint process by restricting his access to her or removing him from a position of authority; and by failing to adequately monitor or discipline MacPhail. In his statement of defense, filed in June 2026, MacPhail denied the allegations, but acknowledged having a “bound of friendship, built on respect and trust” with the student, and claimed that Hamilton spoke candidly with MacPhail about her sexuality, physical appearance, and relationships. MacPhail also claimed that on the day prior to Hamilton making her complaint to the university, she told him that he smelled good and kissed him goodbye. MacPhail has asked the court to dismiss the lawsuit with costs. The allegations have not been proven in court. MacPhail is the brother-in-law of Robert Knowles, the university’s Interim President and Vice-Chancellor.

=== Deceptive and misleading international recruitment practices ===
International recruitment companies have been accused of using deceptive and misleading practices to recruit international students to Crandall University’s graduate programs. Practices have included publishing promotional material that displays other universities’ and municipalities’ campuses and buildings, (Note: Image shown is of the University of Glasgow Memorial Chapel.) (Note: Image shown is of the Welfenschloss, the main building of the Leibniz University Hannover.) (Note: Image shown is of the Crandall Public Library in Glens Falls, New York.) (Note: Image shown is a concept image for an athletic facility at Crandall Independent School District in Crandall, Texas.) AI-generated photos supposedly depicting the university, and advertising academic programs not offered by the university. (Note: Crandall University does not offer a Master of Science in Applied Computer Science degree.) (Note: Crandall University does not offer bachelor degree programs in computer science or health sciences.)

In August 2026, India’s Chandigarh Consumer Disputes Redressal Commission found a study-abroad consultancy guilty of unfair trade practices after it failed to deposit a prospective Crandall University student’s tuition fee and did not process her visa. The consultancy was ordered to pay the woman 11,02,185 Indian rupees (approximately 15,844 Canadian dollars) in damages.

== Affiliations ==
Crandall is an affiliate member of the Association of the Registrars of the Universities and Colleges of Canada (ARUCC); a full member of the ARUCC regional association, the Atlantic Association of Registrars and Admissions Officers (AARAO); and an active member of both Christian Higher Education Canada (CHEC) and the New Brunswick Association of Private Colleges and Universities. It is also an associate member of the Washington, D.C. based Council for Christian Colleges and Universities.

== Athletics ==
Crandall University is represented in the Atlantic Collegiate Athletic Association (ACAA) by 8 varsity teams. The Chargers teams include men's and women's soccer, basketball, volleyball, and cross country. The Chargers also offer a boxing club program that competes internationally.

The Chargers have won nine ACAA championship banners:

- Women's soccer in 2003–04
- Women's cross country in 2022–23 and 2023–24
- Men's cross country in 2021–22, 2022–23, 2023–24, 2024–25, 2025–26, and 2026-27

=== Use of ineligible players and forfeitures ===
In the 2018–2019 men’s basketball season, the Chargers had to forfeit seven games they had previously won after it was discovered that they used an ineligible player. Under league rules professional players are required to wait a full year after their last professional game before they are eligible to play in the ACAA. The university disclosed that the player had previously played professional basketball, but they failed to note the date of the player's last professional game. The team had been in fourth place prior to the forfeitures but immediately dropped to last place in the eight team league as a result. The team finished the season in seventh place, recording five wins in their 21 game season. Another incident occurred on January 10, 2025 when the Chargers had to forfeit a game it had initially won 73-60 against the University of King’s College Blue Devils after it was discovered that Crandall used an ineligible player. (Note: The ACAA’s regulations for basketball state, “If a team must forfeit a game or games (i.e. use of ineligible players), the score shall be recorded as a “2-0 win for the opponent””.)

Throughout the 2025-2026 restructuring and staff turnover, two additional incidents occurred. The Chargers men’s soccer team had to forfeit two games (a win and a tie) for use of an ineligible player, which resulted in the team finishing the season in fifth place in the seven team league. Without the forfeitures, the team would’ve finished the season in fourth place and qualified for playoffs for the first time since the 2016–17 season. Weeks later at the 2025-26 ACAA Cross Country Championships, the newly hired head coach of the women’s cross country team failed to declare an athlete as a first year player, which resulted in that player not receiving the conference’s Women’s Rookie of the Year Award. (Note: The Rookie of the Year Award is awarded to the highest placing rookie. Second place finisher Maryanne Gard of Crandall University was the highest placing rookie, however the award went to the third place finisher, who was properly declared as a first year player.) This would have been the first time that an athlete from Crandall University had received the award.

=== 2025-2026 restructuring and staff turnover ===
Throughout the 2025-2026 school year, Crandall University began restructuring its Department of Athletics & Recreation and replacing nearly all department staff. The contracted head coaches of all women’s programs were replaced with full-time employees in the summer/fall of 2025, followed by the head coaches of all men’s programs (except soccer) in the winter/spring of 2026. All assistant coaches departed at the same time as their team’s head coach, and the university replaced its physiotherapy providers in the fall of 2025. The university’s athletic trainer also departed, without replacement, in the fall of 2025. Although the university claimed that these would be the first head coaches in the ACAA to serve in full-time roles, other schools have full-time coaches on staff in select sports, including Mount Allison University, Mount Saint Vincent University, and Holland College. In September 2025, the Director of Athletics & Recreation resigned, and the newly hired head coach of the women’s cross country team was appointed to the roll on an interim basis. The first-hired full-time coach (women’s soccer head coach) also resigned in September 2025. Despite his actions that resulted in the men’s soccer team not qualifying for playoffs and an athlete on the women’s cross country team not receiving the ACAA Rookie of the Year Award, Jaderson Cordeiro was appointed to the position permanently in March 2026. In response to the new Director’s mismanagement of eligibility matters and failure to abide by policies of the ACAA and CCAA, the university created a new full-time varsity coordinator position set to start in July 2026, which would be responsible for monitoring the eligibility status of athletes and ensuring compliance with regulations and policies. The Associate Director of Athletics & Recreation departed in June 2026.

Because the boxing head coach is also the university’s Provost & Vice-President for Academic Affairs and does not report to the Athletics Department, the boxing team has not been subject to the restructuring or staff turnover.

== Notable alumni ==
- David Alward – former Premier of New Brunswick (Note: Alward studied at Atlantic Baptist College for one year before transferring to Bryan College, and thus did not graduate from Crandall University.)
- Ken LeBlanc – entrepreneur
- Cathy Rogers – politician

== See also ==
- List of schools in Moncton
- Higher education in New Brunswick
- List of universities and colleges in New Brunswick
