= SHRC =

SHRC may refer to:

- Saskatchewan Human Rights Commission in Canada
- Scottish Human Rights Commission in the United Kingdom
- Sexual Health Resource Centre in Kingston, Ontario
- State Historical Resources Commission in California
- State Human Rights Commission, a type of government agency in India
- Software Human Resources Council, former name of the Information and Communications Technology Council
