= ASRC =

ASRC may refer to:

- Arctic Slope Regional Corporation, a U.S. federal contractor with business in the aerospace, defense, and other sectors
- Asylum Seeker Resource Centre, a support organisation for asylum seekers in Melbourne, Australia
- Australian and New Zealand Standard Research Classification
- Congress of Union Retirees of Canada, (French: Association des syndicalistes à la retraite du Canada)
