= Canadian Postmasters and Assistants Association =

Trade union

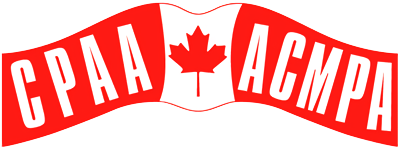
- Abbreviation: CPAA
- Formation: 1902; 124 years ago
- Founded at: Stonewall, Manitoba, Canada
- Type: Trade union
- Headquarters: Ottawa, Ontario, Canada
- Location: Canada
- Members: 8,000 (2019)
- Official languages: English; French
- President: Dwayne Jones
- Affiliations: Canadian Labour Congress
- Website: cpaa-acmpa.ca

The Canadian Postmasters and Assistants Association (CPAA; French: Association canadienne des maîtres de poste et adjoints [ACMPA]) represents rural postal workers for the Canada Post Corporation. The trade union belongs to the Canadian Labour Congress as the federation's smallest national union.

The organization publishes The Canadian Postmaster and hosts a triennial convention.

== History ==
The organization began in 1902 in Stonewall, Manitoba. From there, the trade union spread out through rural areas of Canada. In 2002, Canada issued a commemorative stamp for the organization's 100th anniversary.

In recent years, the organization has struggled with closures of rural post offices designed to cut costs at Canada Post. Even among rural post offices that remain open, many face cuts in hours and staff.

== Jurisdiction ==
The union represents Canada Post employees who work in rural post offices. There are approximately 6,462 full- and part-time permanent staff who are members of CPAA. In addition, there are approximately 5,209 term or temporary employees.

The CPAA represents the following classifications:

- Semi-Staff Postmasters
- Group Postmasters
- Senior Assistants
- Full-Time Assistants
- Part-Time Assistants

In contrast, the Canadian Union of Postal Workers represents a larger majority of Canada Post's employees: 54,000 out of 72,000. The rest belong the Association of Postal Officials of Canada (3,400 supervisors), the Union of Postal Communications Employees (2,600 technical workers) and the CPAA (12,000 rural workers).

The CUPW put forward several merger proposals but, to date, the Canadian Postmasters have rebuffed them.

== See also ==
- National Rural Letter Carriers' Association, the US equivalent
- Affiliated unions of the Canadian Labour Congress
