= Libby Burnham =

Canadian lawyer

- Education: Dalhousie University; Acadia University
- Scientific career
- Workplaces: Acadia University

Libby Burnham was the Chancellor of Acadia University in Nova Scotia, Canada from 2011 to 2018. She is a legal and business advisor.

Burnham graduated from Acadia University in 1960. She earned a law degree in 1963 from Dalhousie University.
