= Canadian Baptists of Atlantic Canada =

Baptist Christian association of churches in Canada

- Classification: Evangelicalism
- Theology: Baptist
- Associations: Canadian Baptist Ministries; Evangelical Fellowship of Canada
- Region: Atlantic Canada
- Headquarters: Moncton, New Brunswick, Canada
- Origin: 1905-06
- Merger of: Baptist Convention of the Maritime Provinces; Free Christian Baptist Conference of New Brunswick; Free Baptist Conference of Nova Scotia
- Congregations: 414
- Official website: atlanticbaptist.ca

The Canadian Baptists of Atlantic Canada (CBAC), formerly known as Convention of Atlantic Baptist Churches (CABC) is a Baptist Christian denomination in the eastern provinces of Canada. The offices of the CBAC are located in Moncton, New Brunswick. The organization is one of four regional denominations of Canadian Baptist Ministries.

== History ==
The Baptist Convention of the Maritime Provinces was founded in 1846. In 1905-06, the Convention (Regular Baptists) merged with the Free Christian Baptist Conference of New Brunswick and the Free Baptist Conference of Nova Scotia (Free Will Baptists) to become the United Baptist Convention of the Maritimes. The Regular Baptist and Free Will Baptist congregations wrote a statement of faith and polity called the "Basis of Union" with which both groups could agree. With the addition of Newfoundland and Labrador to Canada, the organization changed its name to the United Baptist Convention of the Atlantic Provinces in 1963. In 2001, the organization changed its name to the ‘’’Convention of Atlantic Baptist Churches’’’, and again changed in 2016 to the ‘’’Canadian Baptists of Atlantic Canada’’’.

Since 1944, the CBAC has been a partner in Canadian Baptist Ministries.

== Organization ==
According to its 2026 annual report, the CBAC comprises 414 churches across the Atlantic provinces (New Brunswick, Newfoundland and Labrador, Nova Scotia, and Prince Edward Island), and is subdivided into 9 regions and 20 associations.

== Beliefs ==
The CBAC has a Baptist confession of faith, and is a member of both Canadian Baptist Ministries and the Evangelical Fellowship of Canada.

=== Same-sex marriage ===
According to its General Operating Bylaw, the CBAC believes marriage to be “a life-long covenant relationship between one man and one woman”, and defines “spouse” as meaning a person’s spouse of the opposite sex who has been joined in marriage with that person. The CBAC is opposed to same-sex marriages, and prohibits accredited clergy from officiating at same sex marriages on penalty of a charge of professional misconduct and withdrawal of accreditation. The CBAC’s stance on same-sex marriage has led some churches to leave the association and join the more progressive Canadian Association for Baptist Freedoms, beginning with First Baptist Church (Halifax), at which Rev. John E. Boyd officiated a same-sex marriage prior to resigning his accreditation with the CBAC.

== Education ==
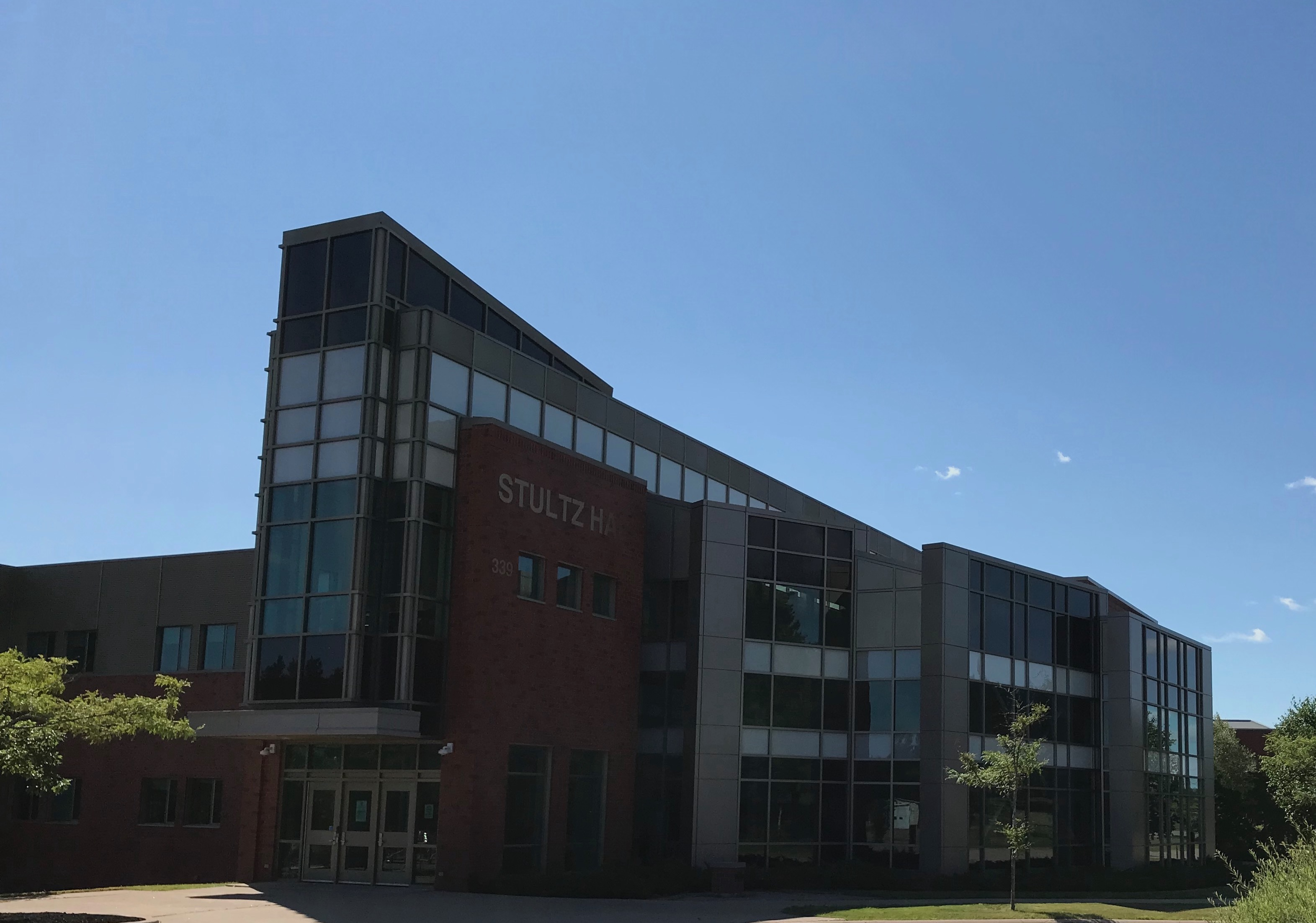
Stultz Hall, Crandall University in Moncton.

The CBAC owns and operates both Crandall University in Moncton, NB and Acadia Divinity College in Wolfville, NS, and appoints a majority of their respective board members.

== Sources ==
- Baptists Around the World, by Albert W. Wardin, Jr.
- The Baptist Heritage: Four Centuries of Baptist Witness, by H. Leon McBeth

== See also ==
- Baptists in Canada
