= Artemas Wyman Sawyer =

American Baptist minister and educator (1827–1907)

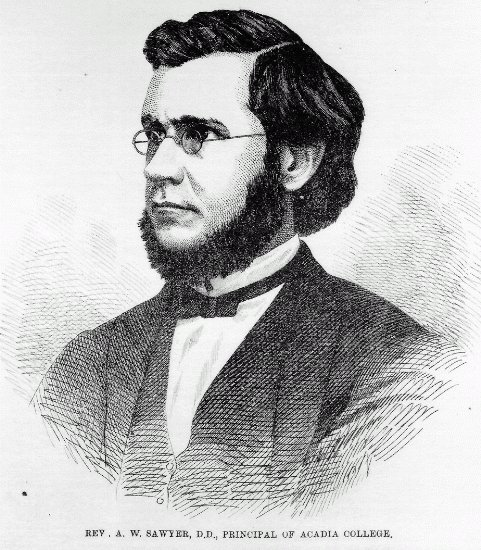
- Born: 4 March 1827; West Haven, Vermont
- Died: 5 August 1907 (aged 80); West Haven, Vermont

Artemas Wyman Sawyer (4 March 1827 – 5 August 1907) was an American Baptist minister and educator. He was the president of Acadia College (now Acadia University) in Nova Scotia, Canada from 1869 to 1896.

Born in West Haven, Vermont, the son of the Reverend Reuben Sawyer and Laura Wyman, Sawyer was educated at the New London Academy and received a Bachelor of Arts in 1847 from Dartmouth College. After teaching in Windsor, Vermont for three years he attended the Newton Theological Institute and graduated in 1853. He was then ordained a minister of Baptist church in Lawrence, Massachusetts.

From 1855 to 1860, he was a professor of classics at Acadia College. From 1860 to 1864, he was the pastor of Baptist church in Saratoga Springs, New York. He served as principal of New London Academy from 1864 to 1869. In 1869, he was appointed president of Acadia College succeeding John Mockett Cramp. He served until 1896.

He died in West Haven, Vermont in 1907.

== Personal life ==
He married Maria E. Chase in 1858. The couple had five children. Notable is Everett Wyman Sawyer.

== Selected works ==
Sawyer, A.W. Education of Women in Nova Scotia and New Brunswick: an Historical Sketch. Windsor: J.J. Anslow, Printer. N.d.

Academic offices
Preceded by John Mockett Cramp	President of Acadia University; 1869-1896	Succeeded by Thomas Trotter
