= Kenneth Komoski =

Educational advocate

Kenneth Komoski was an American educational advocate, nonprofit executive, and former teacher. He died November 15, 2017, aged 89. Komoski served as head of the Center for Programmed Instruction and the Educational Products Information Exchange Institute. In 1964, Life Magazine named him to their list of Young Leaders of the Big Breakthrough. The magazine noted that he "was among the first to explore the new field of education by teaching-machines, such as keyboard devices, microfilm, and computers". Several years later, Komoski coined the term "learner verification and revision" for formative evaluation and modification of instructional materials (aka field testing with learners). His work in educational technology led the International Society for Performance Improvement to award him their Honorary Lifetime Member Award in 1979.

== Early life and education ==
Komoski was born in the Heights section of Jersey City, New Jersey in 1928. He graduated from Morristown School (now Morristown-Beard School) in Morristown, New Jersey in 1947. Komoski then completed a bachelor's degree and a master's degree in history and philosophy at Acadia University in Wolfville, Nova Scotia, Canada. Komoski also studied at the Union Theological Seminary affiliated with Columbia University in Manhattan.

After graduating from Acadia University, Komoski returned to Morristown School to work as a teacher. He then taught social studies at the Collegiate School in New York City and served as head of its middle school. Komoski later served as the director of the Automated Teaching Project at the Collegiate School. Begun during the late 1950s, this project led efforts to test programmed instruction in both elementary schools and secondary schools. Faculty members programmed machines that asked students' questions and then presented them within immediate answers to facilitate learning. While working at the Collegiate School, Komoski participated as one of 27 invited educators at the 1960 Designs For Learning national conference in Sarasota, Florida. Run by the Ford Foundation's Educational Facilities Laboratories, the conference discussed school designs to meet changing educational needs.

== Career in educational development and technology ==
In 1961, Komoski began working as president of the Center for Programmed Instruction (CPI). Started as an independent nonprofit organization, the center affiliated with the Institute for Educational Technology at Columbia's Teachers College. Funded by the Carnegie Corporation of New York, CPI supported the development of programmed instruction as a practice. Komoski later served as associate executive director of the Institute for Educational Technology and adjunct associate professor of education at Columbia. While at Columbia, Komoski authored the first publication to document that many educational materials did not undergo field testing. Developers did not revise the materials with feedback from real learners.

During the 1960s, Komoski consulted on educational technology for UNESCO (the United Nations Educational, Scientific, and Cultural Organization). He taught workshops on programmed instruction in Ramallah, Jordan (now a Palestinian city in the West Bank) and Ibadan, Nigeria. Komoski later consulted for the U.S. Department of State and President Lyndon B. Johnson's Commission on Instructional Technology. In 1970, Komoski authored the report "Toward the Development of Effective Instructional Technology for American Education". This work served as a supporting paper for the 1970 Commission's final report to the President and Congress.

In 1983, Komoski began hosting the half-hour TV show Educational Computing on PBS. Funded by the Corporation for Public Broadcasting, the show discussed how computers support learning in classrooms and at home. Educational Computing featured news stories, interviews, and demonstrations of recommended educational software. Episodes also discussed computer networking and the digital divide separating poor school districts from districts with more resources.

== EPIE Institute ==
In 1967, Komoski authored Development of a System for An Educational Products Information Exchange. This report discussed a long-term federally funded study on the development of an exchange to evaluate educational products. The findings led Komoski to co-found the Educational Products Information Exchange Institute (EPIE Institute) and serve as its executive director. The EPIE Institute developed model practices for whole curriculum approaches to align curriculum with learning goals and evaluate learning resources. It also reviewed and evaluated teaching aids and educational technology. In 1982, the EPIE Institute began a partnership with the Consumers Union, the producer of Consumer Reports. The two organizations jointly produced the Pro/Files series of reports to evaluate computers, software, and accessory equipment. Funding from the Richard Lounsbery Foundation and the Ford Foundation supported the project.

During the mid-1990s, the EPIE Institute helped to found the Learning and Information Networking for Community Through Technology (LINCT) Coalition. The Institute then served as LINCT's managing partner organization working with law professor Edgar S. Cahn (the creator of time banking) and researcher Curtiss Priest. LINCT operated as a nonprofit coalition of socially-concerned organizations working with businesses, schools, libraries, governments, and social service agencies.

In 1996, the EPIE Institute published Creating Learning Communities: Practical, Universal Networking for Learning in Schools and Homes. Co-authored by Komoski and Priest, the report presented the findings of a two-year research study on the development of intentional educational networks. The MacArthur Foundation funded this work to support collaborations among schools and their communities.

== Work to address the digital divide ==
In 1983, Komoski launched the Excellence and Equity in Electronic Education (4E) project at the EPIE Institute. Funded by a San Francisco Foundation grant, 4E taught schools how to train parents on the use of computers to support home learning. The project also sought to help low-income families attain computers for use at home.

During the mid to late 1980s and early 1990s, Komoski consulted for networking projects in Battle Creek, Michigan and Indian River County, Florida that connected schools and local communities. The work led him to publish "The 81% Solution" in Education Week, which discussed challenges in addressing learning needs through technology. The article noted that children spend most of their time (81 percent) at home and only 19 percent of their time at school. Komoski proposed the use of community networks to help meet the learning needs of children, particularly at-risk youth from poorer communities. He also suggested ways in which children and families could earn computers donated from businesses while developing their skills.

The ideas proposed in the "81 Percent Solution" later facilitated the work of LINCT to create solutions to address the digital divide. During the mid- and late 1990s, LINCT developed Learn and Earn programs for children and their families, low-wage workers, and unemployed persons. Participants in the programs learned skills in areas such as word processing, spreadsheet use, and use of the Internet and World Wide Web. After completing the Learn and Earn programs, they could bring home a computer for use at home. LINCT piloted Learn and Earn in the New York City metropolitan area in partnership with the Urban League and other community organizations. The success of this program influenced the development of similar programs in Los Angeles, Denver, and Phoenix. These programs later scaled down during the early and mid 2000s because of government funding cuts.

In 2012, Komoski started EPIE's Digital Age Family Literacy Program (DAFLP) at Southampton Intermediate School in Southampton, New York. DAFLP runs a 12-week computing course for families of non-native English-speakers on Long Island. Participants earn home use of their laptop computer after completing the program.

== Federal conferences ==
In 1970, Komoski chaired the Forum on Educational Technology at the White House Conference on Children in Washington, D.C. Led by Stephen H. Hess, the conference discussed the needs of children aged birth to 13. The discussions in the Educational Technology Forum led to recommendations to incorporate educational technology in all federal education programs and Congressional legislation. Recommendations also suggested ways to strengthen individualized learning and incorporate educational technology into the proposed U.S. National Institute of Education. Komoski consulted for the study on the development of the Institute funded by the Rand Corporation.

In 1976, Komoski presented at the Educating All Handicapped Children Conference (EAHCC) in Annapolis, Maryland at the invitation of Elwood L. Bland. Bland headed the Learning Resource Division of the Bureau of Education of the Handicapped (now the Office of Special Education Programs.) The EAHCC conference discussed implications for the use of educational technology to support implementation of the Education for All Handicapped Children Act. (Passed in 1975, the act changed to the Individuals with Disabilities Education Act in 1990.) Komoski's presentation discussed the evaluation of instructional materials to improve classroom instruction for students with disabilities.

Two years later, Komoski presented on "Publishers Responsibilities in Meeting the Continuing Challenge of Literacy" at the National Right to Read Conference. Run by the Institute for Advanced Study under contract with the U.S. Office of Education, the conference had a theme of Literacy: Meeting the Challenge. The conference organizers later published Komoski's presentation in an eight-part series of proceedings.

== Congressional testimony ==
In 1971, Komoski testified before the Select Committee on Education of the House Committee on Education and Labor (now the Committee on Education and the Workforce). The Congressional hearing discussed legislation to establish the U.S. National Institute of Education in the Office of Education of the U.S. Department of Health, Education, and Welfare. (Federal educational agencies now stand alone as the U.S. Department of Education). In 1992, Komoski testified again before the House Subcommittee on Education. This hearing discussed legislation to reauthorize the Office of Educational Research and Improvement in the U.S. Department of Education.

== Jazz and tennis ==
Komoski worked as a jazz singer-songwriter and as a tennis pro. He also served as vice president of the United States National Lawn Tennis Association (now the United States Tennis Association).
