= Linda Silas =

President of the Canadian Federation of Nurses Unions since 2003

President of the Canadian Federation of Nurses Unions (CFNU)
- Incumbent
- Assumed office 2003
- Preceded by: Kathleen Connors

Personal details
- Education: Université de Moncton

Linda Silas is a Canadian nurse and trade unionist. She is the president of the Canadian Federation of Nurses Unions (CFNU) since 2003.

== Early life and education ==
Linda Silas grew up in Dalhousie, New Brunswick, a small community on the Restigouche River. Her father worked at the Abitibi newsprint mill, and served as president of the mill workers’ union local.

Silas studied nursing at the Université de Moncton, where she graduated in 1983.

== Career ==
Silas worked as a nurse in emergency care, critical care, and childbirth. She soon became president of her union local. She was elected President of the New Brunswick Nurses Union, thus becoming the youngest nurses union center president in Canadian history. She remained in that position for 10 years.

In 2003, she was elected president of the CFNU, a position she still holds today.

== Advocacy ==
Under Silas's tenure, the CFNU remained a nonpartisan union center. However, Silas has been a vocal political actor on healthcare issues in Canada. During the COVID-19 pandemic, she repeatedly called on provincial governments to hire more health care workers.

Linda Silas is longtime advocate of universal pharmacare. She claims implementing this policy is especially urgent during a global pandemic.

== Bid for CLC leadership ==
On 3 January 2020, Linda Silas announced she was running to become president of the Canadian Labour Congress (CLC), Canada's House of Labour. Her candidacy was endorsed by major Canadian trade unions such as Teamsters Canada and the Professional Institute of the Public Service of Canada. However, she terminated her campaign in March 2021.

== Honours and awards ==
In 2025 Silas was awarded honorary fellowship of the Royal College of Nursing
