= Nova Scotia Nurses' Union =

Labour union in Nova Scotia, Canada

- Abbreviation: NSNU
- Founded: June 15, 1976; 50 years ago
- Headquarters: 150 Garland Avenue Dartmouth, Nova Scotia B3B 0A7
- President: Janet Hazelton
- 1st Vice President: Donna Gillis
- Website: www.nsnu.ca

The Nova Scotia Nurses' Union (NSNU) is a trade union in the Canadian province of Nova Scotia representing over 9000 nurses in the province. It was founded in 1976, and is headquartered in Dartmouth, Nova Scotia. The union publishes a newsletter called What's NU?, with six issues a year. The NSNU is a member of the Canadian Federation of Nurses Unions and is an affiliate of the Canadian Labour Congress.

== History ==
The Nova Scotia Nurses' Union was founded on June 15, 1976.

In October 2016, the union headquarters was moved three blocks south from 30 Frazee Ave. to 150 Garland Ave., in Burnside, Dartmouth. The new office, with more storage space and parking capacity, was built by Lindsay Construction company.

Janet Hazelton, a registered nurse and public administrator, has served as president since 2002, and is the union's longest-serving president. In April, 2025, she was acclaimed to serve another two-year term.

== Public stances ==
In April 2026, long-term care home workers affiliated with CUPE issued strike notice to five employers over a pay dispute. The NSNU "threw its support" behind the striking employees, raising some $10,000 to donate to them. Hazelton stated the union's commitment to supporting the striking workers financially.

=== Involvement in long-gun registry debate ===
The union joined the Halifax Regional Police, the Nova Scotia Advisory Council on the Status of Women, and the Canadian Network of Women's Shelters in 2010 in defending the Canadian long-gun registry, then under debate in the House of Commons. NSNU President Hazelton read a joint statement at a press conference declaring their commitment to the protection public safety. Hazelton told reporters that she didn't believe Conservative Prime Minister Stephen Harper's arguments against the registry, rejecting the assertion that it was an ineffective waste of money, and instead linking long guns to spousal violence and the murder of women, arguing that the registry does save lives and protects public safety. According to Hazelton, "88 per cent of women killed by a gun are killed with a shotgun or rifle". Some of Hazelton's remarks on how nurses "witness first-hand the horrific injuries and tragic deaths that result from firearms" and "meet victims who fall prey to long-guns and attempt to save them" were quoted by Liberal MP Irwin Cotler in a 2011 House of Commons debate on the long-gun registry. Cotler challenged the government to respond to criticism such as Hazelton's, asking, "is her voice and that of the victims for whom she speaks, to be ignored or mocked yet again as an inconvenient truth?" The government benches did not address the specific question.
