= Adam Vincent Clarke =

Canadian composer (born 1992)

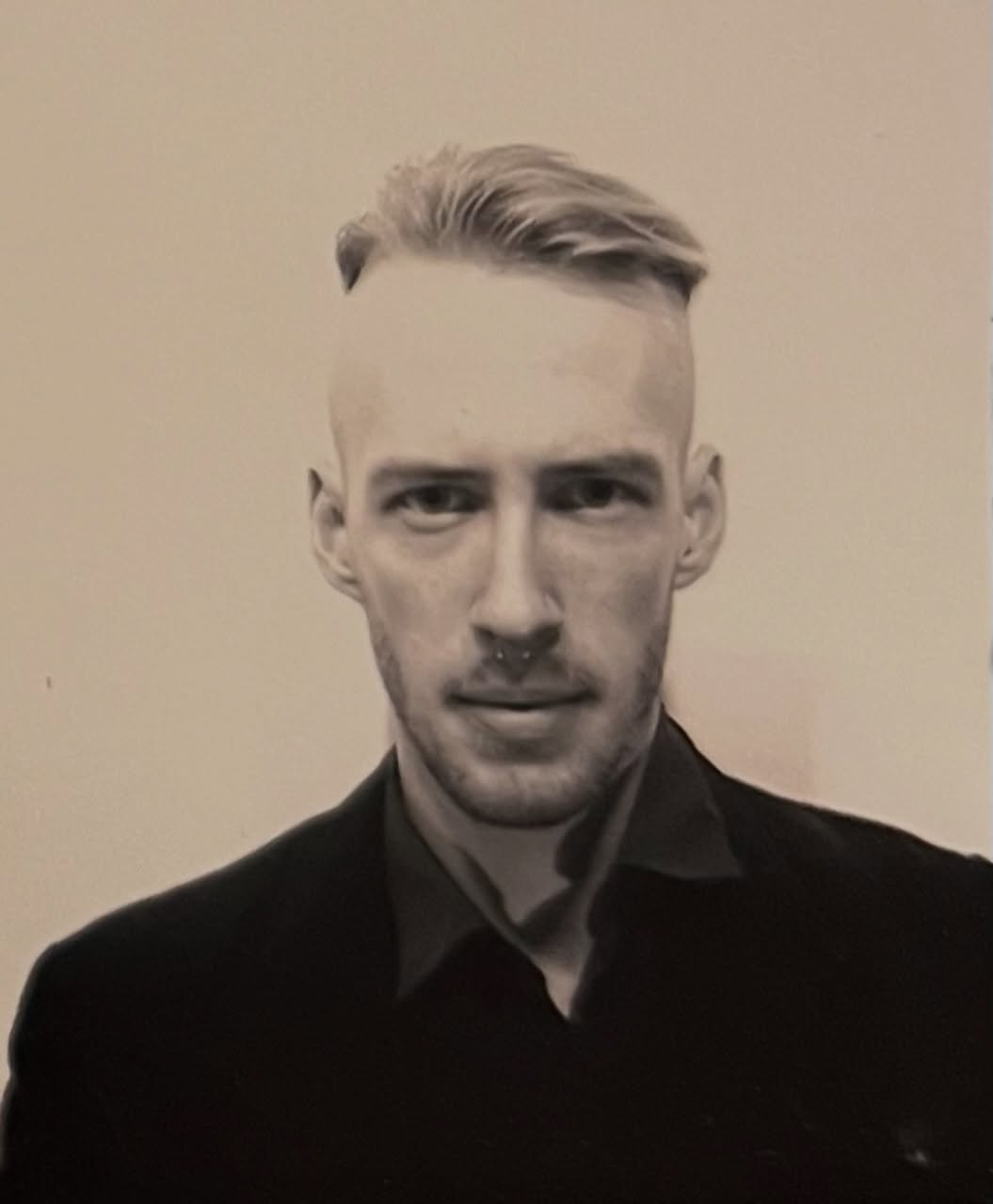
- Clarke in 2026

Background information
- Born: 1992 (age 33–34); Nova Scotia, Canada
- Genres: Contemporary classical music
- Occupation: Composer
- Website: www.adamvclarke.com

Adam Vincent Clarke (born 1992) is a Canadian composer of contemporary classical music, opera, and dance. Clarke was born in Nova Scotia, later moving to Antwerp, Belgium where he co-founded the dance-theatre company Âmok/Âmok in 2016. His style of composition is characterized by a fusion of folk traditions, contemporary classical music, and melodic structures.

== Early life and education ==
Clarke was born in 1992 in Nova Scotia, Canada, growing up in the community of Greenwood. He developed an interest in music as a child, beginning to learn to play the bagpipes at the age of nine. During this period he cultivated a fascination for Eastern Canadian folk music, which later influenced his compositions. Clarke was also inspired by heavy metal, and learned to play the electric guitar prior to pursuing formal musical education. He studied composition at Acadia University under Dinuk Wijeratne and Derek Charke, going on to earn a master's degree at the Royal Conservatory of Antwerp in Belgium.

== Career ==
Clarke's work spans contemporary classical music, opera, and interdisciplinary performance. His compositions have been commissioned and performed internationally by ensembles and companies such as BalletX, Sadler's Wells, and National Dance Company Wales.

Since 2016, Clarke has been based in Antwerp, Belgium, where he co-founded the dance-theatre company Âmok/Âmok with choreographer Lore Borremans.

In 2022, Clarke was interviewed by Romanian television network TVR for his role in Hang in there, Baby! performed at Sadler's Wells Theatre. The performance was received positively by other media outlets such as The Stage. The same year, he was a nominee for Classical Composer of the Year at the 2022 East Coast Music Awards.

== Style ==
Clarke's music is characterized by a fusion of folk traditions, contemporary classical music, and melodic structures. His works draw on Bulgarian, Celtic, and Eastern European folk rhythms and harmonies, integrating them into modern theatrical settings. His 2019 composition Balkan Dance exemplifies this fusion, incorporating Bulgarian rhythms and intricate vocal writing. Music critic Arnaud G. Veydarier described it as "both limpid and intense, with particular attention paid to the vocal lines that captivate the listener with their finesse and expressiveness."

== Selected works ==
- Balkan Dance (2019) – Chamber work for Messiaen Quartet & Soprano, premiered in Bulgaria and Canada.
- Hang in there, Baby! (2022) – Dance-theatre work for Sadler's Wells, choreographed by John-William Watson.
- Study II (2023) – Created for Shane Urton’s Sweetspot, performed by RDT Utah, premiered in Salt Lake City, USA.
- Two People in Love Never Shake Hands (2024) – Ballet for BalletX, choreographed by Nicola Wills, premiered in Philadelphia, USA.
