= Sonny Arrojado =

Filipino nurse and trade unionist

Asuncion Arrojado is a Filipino nurse and trade unionist. She was the founding president of the National Federation of Nurses’ Unions, now known as the Canadian Federation of Nurses Unions.

== Early life and education ==
Asuncion Arrojado grew up in Roxas City, Panay Island, central Philippines. She studied nursing at the University of Santo Tomas where she graduated in 1967.

== Career ==
In 1968, she went to Canada where she found a job at the general hospital in the town of Flin Flon, Manitoba. In the early 1970s, she relocated to Winnipeg to work at Saint Boniface Hospital. She soon became president of her local union.

On May 1, 1981, International Workers’ Day, she was elected as the first president of the National Federation of Nurses Unions, where she served for one term.
