= Canadian Association of Professional Employees =

Public-sector trade union

- Association canadienne des employés professionnels
- Abbreviation: CAPE
- Formation: 2003
- Merger of: Canadian Union of Professional and Technical Employees; Social Science Employees Association
- Type: Trade union
- Headquarters: Ottawa, Ontario, Canada
- Location: Canada
- Members: 27,000
- Official languages: English; French
- President: Nathan Prier
- Affiliations: Canadian Labour Congress
- Website: acep-cape.ca

The Canadian Association of Professional Employees (CAPE; French: Association canadienne des employés professionnels [ACEP]) is a Canadian federal public service labour union. It represents more than 27,000 members. CAPE is a national affiliate of the Canadian Labour Congress. Its president since January 2024 is Nathan Prier of British Columbia. It was in 2025 Canada’s third-largest federal public service union.

== History ==
CAPE was formed in 2003, when the members of the Social Science Employees Association and the Canadian Union of Professional and Technical Employees voted in favour of merging to create a new union.

=== Bargaining ===
CAPE bargains on behalf of the EC and TR groups in the federal government, as well as Library of Parliament employees, Office of the Parliamentary Budget Officer employees, and civilian members of the RCMP.

In 2026, CAPE’s membership voted to pursue an open bargaining process for both its EC and TR groups – a first for a Canadian federal government union. Employer proposals are shared directly with the membership and members can observe the negotiations.

=== Activism ===
CAPE members and leadership group have been active in promoting social causes.

In November 2023, national president Camille Awada resigned after it was discovered that thoughts he had posted on social media displayed an anti-Israel bias.

Along with other unions, CAPE has called for a permanent ceasefire in the Israeli invasion of the Gaza Strip, including the release of both Israeli hostages and Palestinian civilians held by the IDF.

In June 2025, a complaint was filed with the union alleging that its President Nathan Prier had used language deemed defamatory to other users while posting personal opinions about Israel's policy anonymously on Reddit. Prier acknowledged to the National Post that the comments in question were his own and a spokesman for the Centre for Israel and Jewish Affairs argued comments directed to CAPE members might make him unfit to lead the Public Service union.

== See also ==
- Affiliated unions of the Canadian Labour Congress
