= Lillian Chase =

Canadian physician (1894–1987)

Lillian Alice Chase (July 12, 1894 – August 28, 1987) was a Canadian physician who is regarded as an early expert in the treatment of diabetes.

== Early life ==
Lillian Alice Chase was born on July 12, 1894 in Cornwallis, Nova Scotia, to parents Oscar and Elizabeth Chase. She attended Wolfville School and studied at Acadia University from 1912 to 1916. She excelled in sport at Acadia, competing in hockey, basketball and tennis. After graduating from Acadia, she worked as a schoolteacher for a year before enrolling at the University of Toronto Faculty of Medicine, and completed her medical degree in 1922.

== Medical career ==
Chase began her career as an intern at Toronto General Hospital, where she became interested in the treatment of diabetes after meeting Leonard Thompson, the first patient to receive insulin. She undertook postgraduate research on diabetes at the University of Rochester in New York before returning to Canada. She set up a practice in Regina, Saskatchewan, in 1925 and remained there until 1942; she was known for her expertise on diabetes and was frequently called to consult on other physicians' diabetic patients. In 1932, she became the first female president of the Regina General Hospital. She served with the Royal Canadian Army Medical Corps from 1942 to 1945, during which time she worked at Sunnybrook Hospital in Toronto as well as caring for soldiers on ships to and from England. In 1945, she joined the staff of Women's College Hospital in Toronto, where she conducted a weekly diabetes clinic.

Chase was a founding member of the Canadian Diabetes Association in 1953. She retired soon after she was awarded an honorary doctorate by Acadia University in 1969. She died on August 28, 1987, in Ottawa.
