= Prince Edward Island Union of Public Sector Employees =

The PEI Union of Public Sector Employees is a union serving provincial and municipal public sector and private sector workers in Prince Edward Island, Canada. Founded in 1945, it is composed of 20 locals with Charlottetown City Hall staff having joined in 2017.
