= Saskatchewan Federation of Labour =

- Abbreviation: SFL
- Formation: 1956
- Type: Trade union centre
- Headquarters: Regina, Saskatchewan, Canada
- Location: Saskatchewan, Canada
- Members: 100,000
- President: Marilynne MacFarlane
- Secretary-treasurer: Darcy Schaerer
- Parent organization: Canadian Labour Congress
- Website: sfl.sk.ca

The Saskatchewan Federation of Labour (SFL) is the Saskatchewan provincial trade union federation of the Canadian Labour Congress. Founded in 1956, it has a membership of 100,000. The primary function of the SFL is to lobby branches of Canadian government on behalf of the unions the SFL represents.

== Leadership ==
=== Presidents ===
- John Macleod (1976-1978)
- Nadine Hunt (1978-1988)
- Barbara Byers (1988-2002)
- Larry Hubich (2002-2018)
- Lori Johb (2018-2026)
- Marilynne MacFarlane (2026–Present)
