= Acadia University Faculty Association =

The Acadia University Faculty Association was certified on July 15, 1976, and is the trade union representing the full-time and part-time professors, instructors, and academic librarians and archivists at Acadia University in Nova Scotia. AUFA members have taken strike action three times in their history: in the spring of 2004 and the fall of 2007, during the presidency of Gail Dinter-Gottlieb; and in February 2022 during the presidency of Peter Ricketts. AUFA is a member of the Canadian Association of University Teachers (CAUT).
