= Ontario Nurses' Association =

Trade union representing nurses in Ontario

ONA
- Ontario Nurses' Association
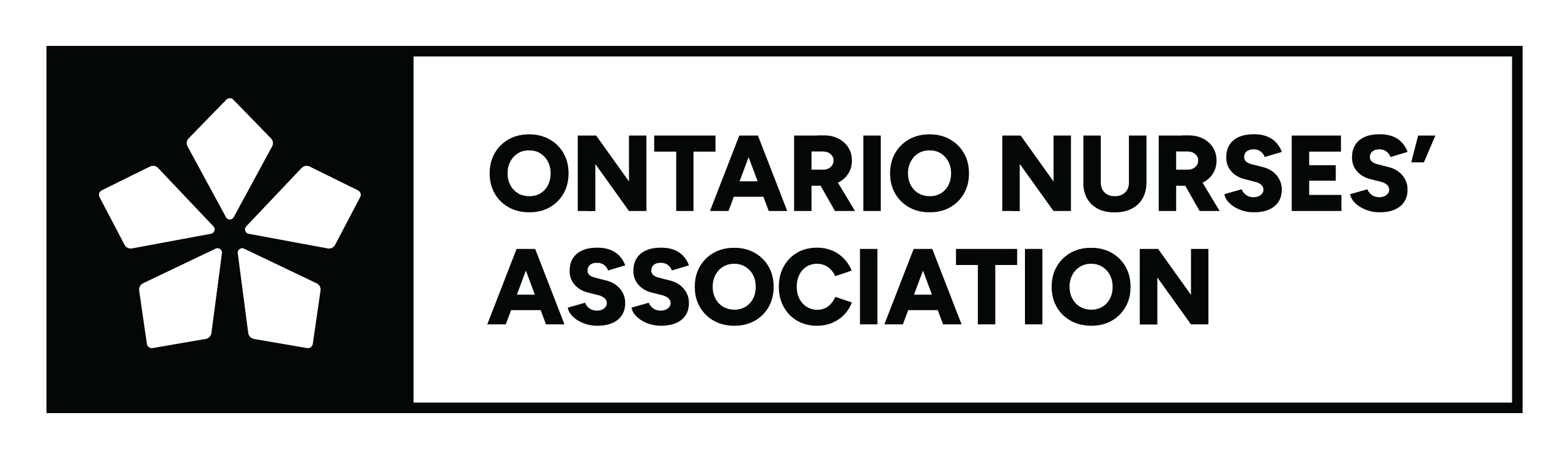
- Founded: 1973
- Headquarters: Toronto, Ontario
- Location: Canada
- Members: 65,000
- Provincial President: Erin Ariss
- CEO: Andrea Kay
- Affiliations: CFNU, CLC, OFL
- Website: https://www.ona.org

Founded in 1973, the Ontario Nurses’ Association (ONA) is the trade union that represents 60,000 registered nurses and allied health professionals working in hospitals, long-term care facilities, public health, community agencies and industry throughout the province of Ontario. ONA has more than 14,000 nursing student affiliates; all members of the Canadian Nursing Students' Association who study in the province.

ONA is a member of the Canadian Federation of Nurses' Union (CFNU), and thereby affiliated with the Canadian Labour Congress (CLC). ONA is also a member of the Ontario Federation of Labour (OFL).

ONA's head office is located in Toronto, Ontario. Regional Offices are located in Hamilton, Kingston, London, Orillia, Ottawa, Sudbury, Thunder Bay, Timmins, and Windsor.

== 2019 strike and contract negotiations ==
On March 7, 2019, members of the ONA voted unanimously to strike due to the fact that the proposed Windsor-Essex County Health Unit proposed only a 1% raise. Following several weeks of negotiations, the union won an annual 1.5% pay raise for three years, for a total of 4.5%. In addition to the wage gains, the union won increased family medical leave and a provision to prohibit discrimination based on sexual orientation, gender identity, or gender expression.
