= Manitoba Nurses' Union =

Canadian trade union

Manitoba Nurses Union
- Abbreviation: MNU
- Formation: 1975
- Type: Trade union
- Headquarters: Winnipeg, Manitoba, Canada
- Location: Manitoba, Canada
- Members: 12,000 (2019)
- President: Darlene Jackson
- Affiliations: Canadian Federation of Nurses Unions
- Website: manitobanurses.ca
- Formerly called: Manitoba Organization of Nurses' Associations

The Manitoba Nurses Union is a Canadian trade union representing registered nurses, licensed practical nurses, registered psychiatric nurses, and operating room technicians in Manitoba. It is affiliated with the Canadian Federation of Nurses Unions (CFNU), the Canadian Labour Congress (through the CFNU), and the Manitoba Council of Health Care Unions.
