= Congress of Union Retirees of Canada =

Canadian trade union retiree organization

- Association des syndicalistes à la retraite du Canada
- Abbreviation: CURC; ASRC
- Formation: 1991; 35 years ago
- Founders: Dan McNeil (SOAR), Larry Wagg (CLC), & Edith Johnston (CAW)
- Founded at: Toronto
- Headquarters: 2841 Riverside Drive; Ottawa, Ontario K1V 8X7
- Coordinates: 45°22′16″N 75°41′31″W
- Region served: Canada
- Members: 500,000
- Official language: English and French
- President: Michael Maclsaac (IAM)
- Treasurer: Mary Forbes (Unifor)
- Secretary: Janice Bernier (SURF)
- First Vice President: Louisette Hinton (UFCW)
- Affiliations: Canadian Labour Congress
- Website: unionretiree.ca syndicalistesalaretraite.ca

The Congress of Union Retirees of Canada (French: Association des syndicalistes à la retraite du Canada) is an affiliate of the Canadian Labour Congress established in 1991. Over half a million people belong to the retiree organization.

== Organization ==
The group functions as an umbrella organization for the retiree divisions of Canadian trade unions, although individual retirees and their spouses can also join directly. The organizational structure includes in provincial, territorial, and regional councils which coordinate with the broader labour movement.

== Activities ==
CURC advocates politically for the interests of pensioners. Specifically, they campaign for strengthening private pensions, expanding the Canada Pension Plan, increasing the Guaranteed Income Supplement, and gradually lowering the retirement age.

The group also organize social functions such as reunions and picnics. Members provide inter-generational mentorships with emerging labour activists.

== See also ==
- Alliance for Retired Americans: U.S. equivalent
- Affiliated unions of the Canadian Labour Congress
