= First Baptist Church (Halifax) =

- First Baptist Church
- 44°38′07″N 63°35′46″W
- Location: Halifax, Nova Scotia
- Country: Canada
- Denomination: Baptist

History
- Founded: 1827

First Baptist Church is a progressive Baptist church (named Granville Street Baptist Church until 1886) in Halifax, Nova Scotia.

== Early history ==
The church was established in Halifax Nova Scotia in September 1827, under the name Granville Street Baptist Church.

The individuals who organized it were originally members of the congregation of St. Paul's Anglican Church. Rev. Dr. Twining, an Anglican prothonotary at the time, experienced a shift in his views after being exposed to the teachings of Isaac Temple, private chaplain to Lord Dalhousie. Twining's sermons no longer appealed to John Inglis, the then-rector of St. Paul's, who dismissed Twining from the curacy of the parish. Following the controversy at St. Paul's, Twining, J.W. Nutting, and J. Ferguson left and adopted the Baptist faith. They briefly worshipped at the Baptist church under John Burton, the first known Baptist in the city. The new Baptists purchased land on Granville Street and formed their congregation in a stone chapel that was erected for £2,250. The first baptism was given by Irah Chase on September 30, 1827, on the shores of the Bedford Basin. The following day, Alexis Caswell was ordained as pastor, while Lewis Johnston and J.W. Nutting were chosen as deacons.

Caswell, alongside deacons Nutting and Johnston, and E.A. Crawley, were sent as delegates to the Baptist association in Wolfville. Their advocacy for a higher education initiative helped lay the foundation for the establishment of Acadia University in 1838. The founding members also had close ties to traditional Baptists in New England.

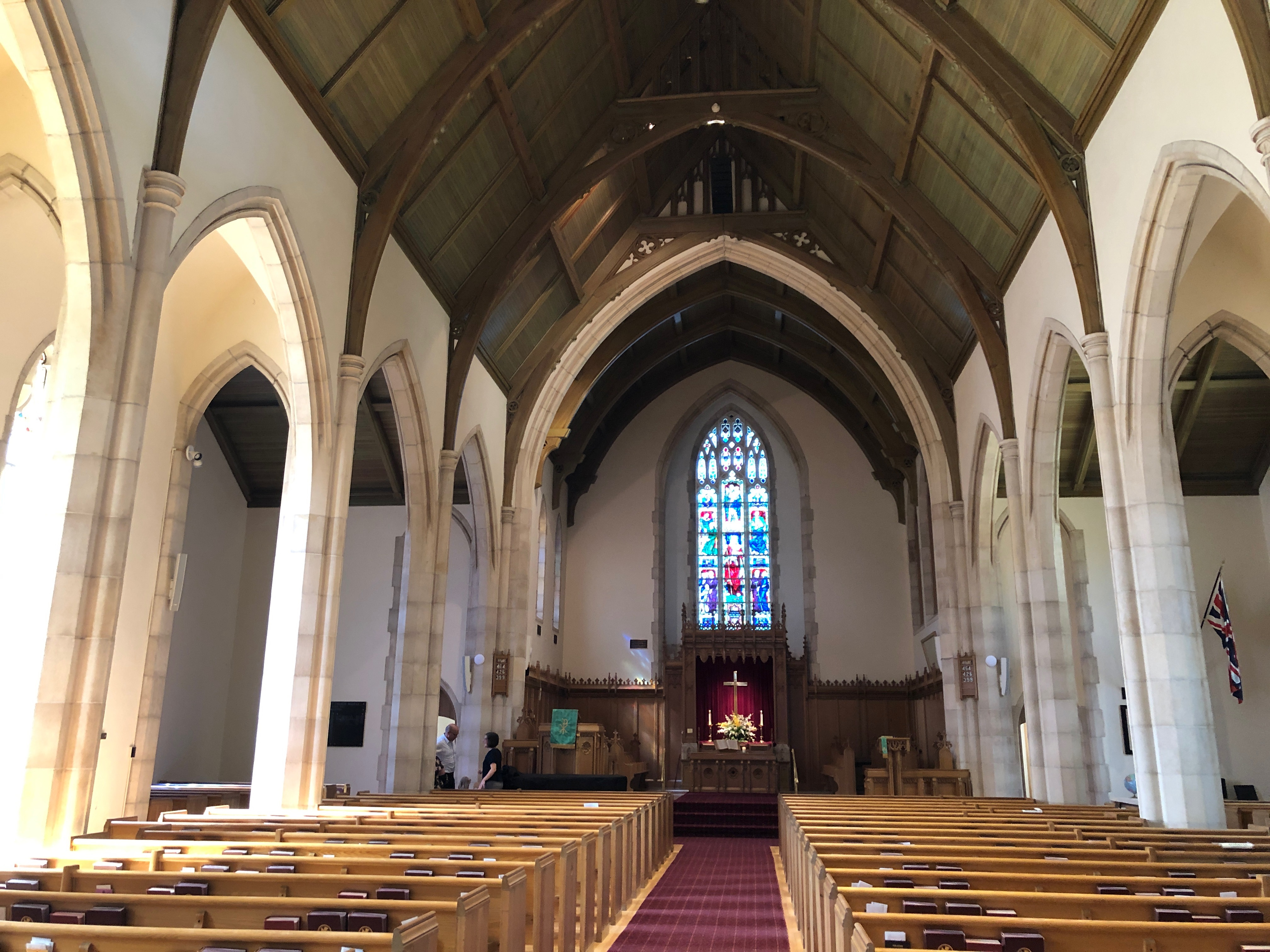
First Baptist Church, Halifax, Nova Scotia

By 1886, the congregation outgrew its building and built a church at the corner of Queen Street and Spring Garden Road. It was a brick building that was semicircular and could hold 700 people in a spacious audience room. There was also a general gallery and a choir gallery behind the preacher's desk. The building was built for $31,000, and the land cost $6,000.

Following the Act of Incorporation passed by the local legislature in May 1886, the name would change to the First Baptist Church. The newly constructed church celebrated its inaugural service on April 10, 1887.

In 1942, a fire damaged the new building, which was rebuilt in 1950.

The First Baptist Church is now located at 1300 Oxford Street in Halifax.
