= Journal for the Study of the Historical Jesus =

- Discipline: New Testament
- Language: English
- Edited by: Sarah E. Rollens, Robert Myles

Publication details
- History: 2003-present
- Publisher: Brill

Standard abbreviations
- ISO 4: J. Study Hist. Jesus

Indexing
- ISSN: 1476-8690

Links
- Journal homepage

According to its Brill listing, The Journal for the Study of the Historical Jesus "investigates the social, cultural and historical context in which Jesus lived, discusses methodological issues surrounding the reconstruction of the historical Jesus, examines the history of research on Jesus, and explores how the life of Jesus has been portrayed in historiographical reception and other media. The Journal for the Study of the Historical Jesus presents articles and book reviews discussing the latest developments in academic research in order to shed new light on Jesus and his world."

== Editor ==
The current executive editors of the journal are:

- Robert Myles, Wollaston Theological College, Australia
- Sarah E. Rollens, Rhodes College, USA
