= Sexual Health Resource Centre =

Canadian non-profit

- Abbreviation: SHRC
- Predecessor: Birth Control and Abortion Information and Referral Centre, Birth Control, VD & Abortion Referral Centre, Birth Control Centre, (Not Just the) Birth Control Centre
- Formation: 1971
- Type: Not-for-profit community group
- Purpose: Information and Referral Service Regarding Sex, Sexuality, and Sexual Health
- Headquarters: Rm 223, 99 University Avenue, Kingston, Ontario, Canada
- Region served: Kingston, Ontario
- Main organ: Executive Board
- Staff: 0
- Volunteers: ~50
- Website: shrckingston.org

The Sexual Health Resource Centre (SHRC) is a non-profit information and referral service that addresses sex, sexuality, and sexual health. It serves the community of Kingston, Ontario, Canada, and is located in the John Deutsch University Centre of Queen’s University. It is operated by volunteers year round who respond to inquiries by phone or in person. It is funded by student fees from the Alma Mater Society and Society of Graduate and Professional Students at Queen’s University.

== History ==
Dr. Jim Whitley, a math professor and assistant to the Principal, helped spearhead a student project in 1971 called the Birth Control and Abortion Information and Referral Centre, which was also staffed by full-time coordinators. One of the initial goals of the Centre was to provide information on “birth control, abortion, infertility, vasectomies and veneral disease, and medical referrals.”

By 1974, its expanding mandate led to a name change to the Birth Control, VD & Abortion Referral Centre. The Centre moved to the Grey House at 51 Bader Lane in 1975 and established a lending library. The name was again changed to the shorter “Birth Control Centre” in 1983. The Centre began selling sexual health products at cost with the introduction of spermicidal foam and condom wallets in the late 1980s. This selection expanded by 1991 to include spermicidal jelly and sponges.

In 1995, the Centre was again renamed as the “(Not Just the) Birth Control Centre” in recognition of its growing mandate, which was again promptly changed to the Sexual Health Resource Centre, which it remains today. In 2004, theSHRC began receiving direct funding from Queen’s University undergraduate students through the establishment of a mandatory $0.85 CAD fee per student. The fee withstood a challenge that it discriminated against students on the basis of religion that same year.

== Services ==
The SHRC is an educational resource to the community it serves. It has its own lending library, separate from the Queen’s University library, and has a diverse selection of pamphlets. SHRC volunteers have also offered educational teach-in sessions for audiences ranging from elementary school to university students and other community groups since 1984. Teach-ins cover a range of topics from healthy relationships, contraception, sexually transmitted infections, and sex toys.

== Products ==
The SHRC also sells an assortment of sexual health and pleasure products at cost. The Centre began selling products in 1987, beginning with spermicidal foam. Contraceptive and protective methods currently sold include a variety of condoms, dental dams, and reality condoms (aka female condoms). The SHRC has also sold sex toys at cost since 2001, such as dildos, masturbatory sleeves, vibrators, and bondage play items.

The SHRC also regularly collaborates with community groups in Kingston with a similar mandate, such as HIV/AIDS Regional Services, ReelOut Queer Film Festival, and Sexual Assault Centre Kingston.

== See also ==
- Sexual Recovery Anonymous
