= Canadian Federation of Nurses Unions =

- Abbreviation: CFNU
- Formation: 1981
- Type: Trade union centre
- Headquarters: Ottawa, Ontario, Canada
- Location: Canada
- Members: Approx. 250,000
- President: Linda Silas
- Affiliations: Canadian Labour Congress; International Council of Nurses
- Website: nursesunions.ca
- Formerly called: National Federation of Nurses Unions

The Canadian Federation of Nurses Unions (CFNU; French: Fédération canadienne des syndicats d'infirmières et infirmiers [FCSII]) is a trade union centre in Canada. The CFNU is a federation of provincial unions representing nurses, nurse practitioners, student nurses, and various allied health care workers. It advocates on a national level for issues related to nurses, patient care, the health care system, and working conditions. As of 2023, the CNFU represents nearly 250,000 nurses and student nurses across Canada, who are members of the nine provincial nurses unions and Canadian Nursing Students’ Association.

== Affiliations ==
The CFNU is a founding member of Global Nurses United and collaborates with the International Council of Nurses. It is a member of the Canadian Health Coalition and the Canadian Labour Congress (CLC), and sits on the CLC's executive committee.

== Membership ==
The CFNU represents almost 250,000 unionized registered nurses (RNs), licensed or registered practical nurses (LPNs/RPNs in Ontario), nurse practitioners (NPs), nursing students and a range of allied health care professionals. Membership is through the CFNU's member organizations, which include nine provincial nurses’ unions, as well as one nursing students’ union. Each organization holds a seat on the CFNU's national executive board, helping to shape the positions and priorities of the national umbrella group.

Members organizations:

- British Columbia Nurses’ Union (BCNU)
- Canadian Nursing Students’ Association (CNSA)
- Manitoba Nurses Union (MNU)
- New Brunswick Nurses Union (NBNU)
- Nova Scotia Nurses’ Union (NSNU)
- Ontario Nurses’ Association (ONA)
- Prince Edward Island Nurses’ Union (PEINU)
- Registered Nurses’ Union Newfoundland and Labrador (RNUNL)
- Saskatchewan Union of Nurses (SUN)
- United Nurses of Alberta (UNA)

== History ==
In Winnipeg on International Workers’ Day, May 1, 1981, the National Federation of Nurses Unions (NFNU) was formed to represent unionized nurses at the national level. More than 300 delegates from every nurses’ union in Canada voted unanimously to form the organization. NFNU was later renamed to Canadian Federation of Nurses Unions (CFNU) in 1999 to represent Canadian nurses internationally.

CFNU established its full-time office in Ottawa in September 1987.

The Founding member organizations were:

- Manitoba Organization of Nurses’ Associations
- New Brunswick Nurses Union
- Newfoundland and Labrador Nurses’ Union
- Prince Edward Island Provincial Collective Bargaining Committee
- Saskatchewan Union of Nurses

CFNU Presidents:

- Sonny Arrojado (1981–1982)
- Mary Dwyer (1982–1983)
- Kathleen Connors (1983–1999)
- Debra McPherson (acting 1999–2000)
- Kathleen Connors (2000–2003)
- Linda Silas (2003–present)

Note: the CFNU no longer elects vice-presidents.

Secretary-Treasurers:

- Jill Jones (1981–1989)
- Dorothy Bragg (1989–1997)
- Debra McPherson (1997–2001)
- Pauline Worsfold (2001–2023)
- Angela Preocanin (2023–present)

== Timeline of CFNU and Canadian nurses unions ==
1973 – Ontario Nurses’ Association (ONA) was founded

1974 – Newfoundland Nurses Union (NNU) founded (later Newfoundland and Labrador Nurses’ Union – NLNU, and then since 2014 Registered Nurses’ Union Newfoundland & Labrador – RNUNL)

1974 – Saskatchewan Union of Nurses (SUN) founded

1975 – Manitoba Organization of Nurses’ Associations (MONA) was founded (in 1990 renamed Manitoba Nurses Union – MNU)

1976 – Nova Scotia Nurses’ Union (NSNU) founded

1977 – United Nurses of Alberta (UNA) founded

1978 – New Brunswick Nurses Union (NBNU) founded

1981 – British Columbia Nurses’ Union (BCNU) founded

1981 – National Federation of Nurses Unions (NFNU) founded by Prince Edward Island, New Brunswick, Newfoundland, Manitoba and Saskatchewan

1981 – NSNU joins NFNU

1982 – NFNU joins the Canadian Health Coalition

1985 – Staff Nurses’ Association of Alberta (SNAA) joins NFNU

1987 – NFNU opens a full-time office in Ottawa and president becomes full-time position

1987 – Prince Edward Island Nurses’ Union (PEINU) founded

1987 – Fédération des Infirmières et Infirmiers du Québec (FIIQ) founded, in 2006 renamed Fédération Interprofessionnelle de la santé du Québec (FIQ)

1992 – BCNU joins NFNU

1998 – NFNU joins the Canadian Labour Congress (CLC)

1999 – United Nurses of Alberta (UNA) joins CFNU, after merging with SNAA

1999 – National Federation of Nurses Unions (NFNU) renamed to Canadian Federation of Nurses Unions (CFNU)

2000 – ONA joins CFNU

2007 – The Canadian Nursing Students’ Association (CNSA) joins CFNU as associate member

2011 – BCNU leaves CFNU and CLC

2013 – Global Nurses United (GNU) is formed with CFNU as a founding member

2019 – All CFNU Member Organizations affiliated with their provincial federations of labour

2022 – BCNU begins process to re-join CFNU

2023 - BCNU rejoins CFNU

== Positions and advocacy ==
The CFNU, along with its member organizations, have championed a wide range of issues and causes, most often related to health care and nurses’ working conditions. It advocates for strong federal leadership in health care. The CFNU works with parliamentarians, provincial premiers and health ministers, union members, other organizations and the public to raise awareness and drive policy. The CFNU typically hosts annual policy events, including at the Council of the Federation premiers’ summits, and provincial health ministers’ summits. It has been recognized as a highly effecting lobbying force.

The CFNU conducts ongoing research on its key priority issues, typically releasing several policy and research reports each year.

Notable advocacy work includes:

- Improving health human resources planning
- Implementing a national, universal pharmacare program
- Eliminating workplace violence in health care
- Transforming Canada's long-term care system
- Supporting mental health for health care workers, and addressing root causes of stress
- Ensuring proper protections (including Personal Protection Equipment - PPE) for health care workers
- COVID vaccine promotion for all Canadians
- Adequate federal health care funding

The CFNU also advocates for climate action, universal child care, justice and equity for Indigenous peoples, human rights and equitable access to health care for all, fair wages and retirement security for all workers, and other issues.

== See also ==
- Nursing in Canada
- Canadian Nurses Association
- List of nursing organizations
- Pharmacare in Canada
- Long-term care in Canada
- List of trade unions in Quebec
- Canadian Medical Association
