= Acadia Divinity College =

Canadian seminary

Coordinates: 45°5′14.5″N 64°21′52.8″W

- Motto: Equipping Christians to Serve
- Type: Seminary
- Established: 1968
- Affiliations: Canadian Baptists of Atlantic Canada, Association of Theological Schools in the United States and Canada, Association for Biblical Higher Education
- Academic affiliations: Acadia University
- President: Anna M. Robbins
- Faculty: 13 faculty and 14 staff
- Students: 209
- Location: Wolfville, Nova Scotia, Canada
- Campus: 250 acres (100 ha)
- Colours: Blue, red, white
- Website: www.acadiadiv.ca

The Acadia Divinity College (ADC) is Baptist Christian seminary located in Wolfville, Nova Scotia, Canada. It is owned by the Canadian Baptists of Atlantic Canada (CBAC). It is governed by a board of trustees, in which a majority of members are appointed by the CBAC, and a few are appointed by the Board of Governors of Acadia University.

As the college also serves as the Faculty of Theology at Acadia University, ADC has access to university facilities, including the Vaughan Memorial Library. Via an agreement with the university, the library houses and provides access to the CBAC’s Atlantic Baptist Archives.

== History ==
As early as 1830, Baptists in Nova Scotia, Canada, established a "department of pious scholars" at Horton Academy in Wolfville (founded 1828) for ministerial training. A decade later, Baptist Leaders resolved to establish a Baptist College, an institution of higher learning where all people would be free to work and study, regardless of religious persuasion. The decision to establish Queen's College, which would become Acadia University, was formally approved by the Nova Scotia Baptist Education Society on November 15, 1838. Preparation for ministry was carried on under various formats until the School of Theology was put on a more formal footing in 1923.

After Acadia University was reorganized in 1966, the Baptists of Atlantic Canada began to operate the School of Theology under the name Acadia Divinity College, and on June 1, 1968, the Acadia Divinity College was established by an act of the Nova Scotia Legislature.

== Centres of Excellence at Acadia Divinity College ==
=== Acadia Centre for Baptist and Anabaptist Studies (ACBAS) ===
Established by Acadia Divinity College in cooperation with the Vaughan Memorial Library of Acadia University in April 1991, encourages and facilitates studies in the fields of Baptist and Anabaptist history and thought, especially in the Atlantic region of Canada.

=== Charles J. Taylor Centre for Chaplaincy and Spiritual Care ===
The Taylor Centre trains and prepares men and women for pastoral ministry in specialized forms, including hospital chaplaincy, military chaplaincy, prison chaplaincy, and a variety of other caring professions, for which care for the Spirit is of primary importance.

=== Andrew D. MacRae Centre for Christian Faith and Culture ===
Provides a forum for helping students and the wider church engage with people and issues, and as a research hub.

== Teaching sites ==
=== Wolfville, Nova Scotia ===
Students can complete any bachelor's, master's, or doctoral degree or program part-time or full-time at ADC's main teaching site located on the campus of Acadia University in Wolfville. All courses required for all degrees are offered on a rotating basis over a two- or three-year period in a variety of teaching formats including once weekly, intensive weeks, and on weekends. All courses are taught in a hybrid formatting allowing students to attend classes from anywhere in the world.

== Continuing education ==
=== Simpson Lectures ===
Mr. Gerald K. Simpson of Fairhaven, Deer Island, New Brunswick, established an endowment in 1979 to finance an annual series of lectures on the practice of ministry prepared primarily for students, pastors, and spouses. The lecturers are outstanding persons in ministry who focus on the role of the minister as both preacher and pastor. This lectureship has welcomed many distinguished preachers including John N. Gladstone, Haddon W. Robinson, Alan Sell, and Gardner Taylor.

=== Hayward Lectures ===
Established and endowed in 1964 by Mrs. C. C. Hayward of Wolfville, the Hayward Lectures provide academic dialogue in Church History, Christian Theology, and Biblical Studies.

== Affiliations ==
The College is owned by the Canadian Baptists of Atlantic Canada.

The Acadia University awards all of the Acadia Divinity College degrees, upon recommendation from the ADC Senate and the Senate of Acadia University. The graduate degrees are accredited by the Association for Biblical Higher Education and the Association of Theological Schools in the United States and Canada.

== Endowed academic chairs ==
Endowed academic (teaching) chairs are established to ensure that permanent funding is available to the college to meet the costs of a professor's salary in a given discipline. Eleven chairs have been established at ADC covering a variety of disciplines.

- Thomas James Armstrong Memorial Professorship of Practical Theology and Church History
- Dr. Millard R. Cherry Chair of Christian Thought and Ethics
- Sheldon and Marjorie Fountain Chair of Evangelism and Mission
- John Gladstone Chair in Preaching and Worship
- Abner J. Langley and Harold L. Mitton Chair of Church Leadership
- William and Virginia Leach Chair of Pastoral Psychology
- Thomas B. McDormand, Charles J. Taylor, and Dennis M. Veinotte Chair of Pastoral Care and Counselling
- Hannah Maria Norris Chair in Christian Missions and Social Issues
- Rev. Dr. William and Pearleen Oliver Chair of Community Leadership and Social Justice
- Payzant Chair of Biblical Studies
- Stevens-Fenerty Chair of Urban Ministry and Church Growth

== See also ==
- List of evangelical seminaries and theological colleges
- Association of Theological Schools in the United States and Canada
- Canadian Baptists of Atlantic Canada (CBAC)
- Canadian Baptist Ministries
- Acadia University
