= Jesus =

1st-century Jewish preacher and religious leader

- יֵשׁוּעַ Yešūaʿ
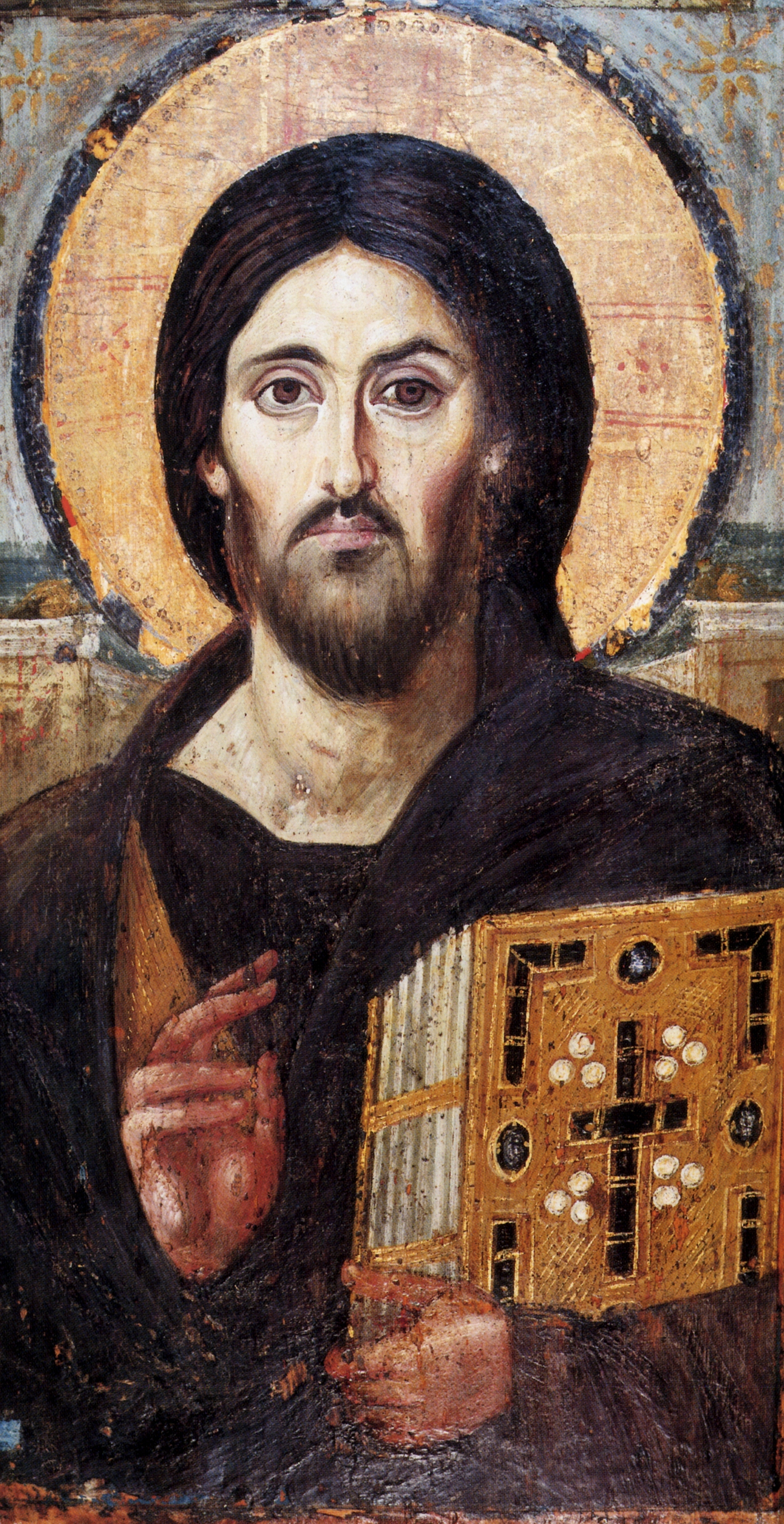
- The Christ Pantocrator of Saint Catherine's Monastery at Mount Sinai, 6th century AD (Note: The facial asymmetry is deliberate.)
- Born: c. 6 to 4 BC (Note: John P. Meier writes that Jesus's birth year is c. 7 or 6 BC. Karl Rahner states that the consensus among Christian scholars is c. 4 BC. E. P. Sanders also favours c. 4 BC and refers to the general consensus. Jack Finegan uses the study of early Christian traditions to support c. 3 or 2 BC.); Herodian kingdom, Roman Empire
- Died: AD 30 or 33 (aged 33–39); Jerusalem, then in Judaea, Roman Empire
- Cause of death: Crucifixion (Note: James Dunn writes that the baptism and crucifixion of Jesus "command almost universal assent" and "rank so high on the 'almost impossible to doubt or deny' scale of historical facts" that they are often the starting points for the study of the historical Jesus. Bart D. Ehrman states that the crucifixion of Jesus on the orders of Pontius Pilate is the most certain element about him. John Dominic Crossan and Richard G. Watts state that the crucifixion of Jesus is as certain as any historical fact can be. Paul R. Eddy and Gregory A. Boyd say that non-Christian confirmation of the crucifixion of Jesus is now "firmly established".)
- Occupations: Jewish preacher; religious leader; craftsman
- Known for: Central role in Christianity; being revered in Islam, the Druze faith and the Baháʼí Faith
- Parents: Mary; Joseph (Note: Traditionally, Christians believe that Mary conceived her son miraculously by the agency of the Holy Spirit. Muslims believe that she conceived her son miraculously by the command of God. From the Christian perspective and according to the canonical gospels, Joseph was the acting adoptive father of Jesus.)

Jesus (Note: Ancient Greek: Ἰησοῦς, romanized: Iēsoús, likely from Hebrew or Aramaic: יֵשׁוּעַ, romanized: Yēšūaʿ) (c. 6 to 4 BC – AD 30 or 33), also known as Jesus Christ, (Note: Coptic: Ⲓⲏⲥⲟⲩⲥ Ⲡⲓⲭ́ρⲓⲥτⲟⲥ; Geʽez: መሲህ ኢየሱስ; Greek: Ἰησοῦς Χριστός; Hebrew: ישוע המשיח; Latin: Iesus Christus; Slavonic: І҆исоу́съ Хрїсто́съ; Syriac: ܝܫܘܥ ܡܫܺܝܚܳܐ) Jesus of Nazareth, and by various other names and titles, was a Jewish preacher and religious leader active in the Roman province of Judaea during the first century. He is the central figure of Christianity, the world's largest religion. Most branches of Christianity consider Jesus the incarnation of God the Son and the awaited Messiah or Christ. Accounts of Jesus's life are contained in the gospels, especially the four canonical gospels of the New Testament. Since the Enlightenment, academic research has produced various views on the historical reliability of the gospels and the extent to which they reflect the historical Jesus, (Note: Ehrman writes: "The notion that the Gospel accounts are not completely accurate but still important for the religious truths they try to convey is widely shared in the scholarly world, even though it's not so widely known or believed outside of it." Sanders writes: "The earliest Christians did not write a narrative of Jesus' life, but rather made use of, and thus preserved, individual units—short passages about his words and deeds. These units were later moved and arranged by authors and editors. [...] Some material has been revised and some created by early Christians.") but virtually all modern scholars of antiquity agree that Jesus existed historically. (Note: In a 2011 review of the state of modern scholarship, Bart D. Ehrman wrote, "He certainly existed, as virtually every competent scholar of antiquity, Christian or non-Christian, agrees." Richard A. Burridge states: "There are those who argue that Jesus is a figment of the Church's imagination, that there never was a Jesus at all. I have to say that I do not know any respectable critical scholar who says that any more." Robert M. Price does not believe that Jesus existed but agrees that this perspective runs against the views of the majority of scholars. James D. G. Dunn calls the theories of Jesus's non-existence "a thoroughly dead thesis". According to Michael Grant (a classicist), "In recent years [as of 2004], 'no serious scholar has ventured to postulate the non historicity of Jesus' or at any rate very few, and they have not succeeded in disposing of the much stronger, indeed very abundant, evidence to the contrary." Robert E. Van Voorst states that biblical scholars and classical historians regard theories of non-existence of Jesus as effectively refuted. Writing on The Daily Beast, Candida Moss and Joel Baden state that, "there is nigh universal consensus among biblical scholars – the authentic ones, at least – that Jesus was, in fact, a real guy.")

According to Christian tradition, as represented in the gospels and the Acts of the Apostles, Jesus was circumcised at eight days old, presented at the Temple in Jerusalem at 40 days. He was baptized by John the Baptist as a young adult, and after 40 days and nights of fasting in the Judean wilderness, he began his public ministry. He was an itinerant teacher whom his followers believed to possess divine authority in interpreting Jewish law. Jesus often debated with other Jews, most commonly the Pharisees and Sadducees, about how best to follow God; engaged in healings; taught in parables; and gathered followers, 12 of whom he appointed as his apostles.

According to the New Testament accounts, Jesus was arrested in Jerusalem and tried by the Sanhedrin; he was then handed over to the Roman authorities, and crucified on the order of Pontius Pilate, the Roman prefect of Judaea. In Christian theology, the Resurrection is the event in which Jesus rose from the dead, on the third day after his death, and this belief became the foundation of the early Christian Church, which expanded into a worldwide movement.

Christian theology includes the beliefs that Jesus was conceived by the Holy Spirit, was born of a virgin named Mary, performed miracles, founded the Christian Church, died by crucifixion as a sacrifice for atonement for sin, was resurrected by God the Father, and ascended into Heaven, from where he will return. Christians commonly believe that Jesus enables people to be reconciled to God. The Nicene Creed asserts that Jesus will judge the living and the dead, either before or after their bodily resurrection, an event associated with the Second Coming of Jesus in Christian eschatology. Many branches of Christianity consider Jesus as the incarnation of God the Son, the second of the three persons of the Trinity. (Note: A small minority of Christian denominations reject trinitarianism, wholly or partly, as non-scriptural.)

The birth of Jesus in the Judean town of Bethlehem is celebrated annually, generally on 25 December, (Note: Most Christians and Alawites celebrate Christmas. Part of the Eastern Christian churches celebrate Christmas on 25 December of the Julian calendar, which currently corresponds to 7 January in the Gregorian calendar. Christmas celebrations begin on Christmas Eve, generally on 24 December.) as Christmas. His crucifixion is commemorated on Good Friday and his resurrection on Easter Sunday. The world's most widely used calendar era—in which the current year is AD 2026 (or 2026 CE)—is traditionally based on the approximate date of the birth of Jesus.

Mainstream Judaism rejects the belief that Jesus was the awaited messiah, holding that he did not fulfil messianic prophecies, was not lawfully anointed, and was neither divine nor resurrected. In contrast, Jesus in Islam (Note: Often referred to by his Quranic name, ʿĪsā) is considered the messiah and a prophet of God, who was sent to the Israelites and will return to Earth before the Day of Judgement. Muslims believe that Jesus was born of the virgin Mary but was neither God nor the son of God. Most Muslims do not believe that he was killed or crucified, but that God raised him into Heaven while he was still alive. (Note: Some mediaeval Muslims believed that Jesus was crucified, as do the members of the modern Ahmadiyya movement; see § Islamic perspectives.) Jesus is also revered in the Baháʼí and Druze faiths, as well as in Rastafari.

== Name ==
A Jewish person in Jesus's time usually had only one name, sometimes followed by a patronymic phrase of the form "son of [father's name]", or by the person's home town. Thus, in the New Testament, Jesus is commonly referred to as "Jesus of Nazareth". (Note: This article uses quotes from the New Revised Standard Version of the Bible.) Jesus's neighbours in Nazareth referred to him as "the carpenter, the son of Mary and brother of James and Joses and Judas and Simon", "the carpenter's son", or "Joseph's son"; in the Gospel of John, the disciple Philip refers to him as "Jesus son of Joseph from Nazareth".

The name Jesus is the English transliteration, through Latin Iesus, of Ancient Greek Ἰησοῦς, which is the Greek rendering of the Hebrew יְהוֹשֻׁעַ Yehoshua (Yehōšuᵃʿ). The Hebrew/Aramaic name was common among Judean Jews at the time of Jesus's birth, although by that period it had been shortened to יֵשׁוּעַ Yeshua (Yešūᵃʿ); the contraction had already occurred in later biblical books such as Nehemiah, where Joshua is referred to as Yeshua.

The name means 'God saves' in Hebrew, literally 'Yahweh saves', from the root ישׁע (y-š-ʿ, 'to save') and the noun יְשׁוּעָה (yeshuʿāh, 'salvation'). The Gospel of Matthew asserts the etymological significance of Jesus's name explicitly in the prophecy of the angel to Joseph about his birth: "you will call his name Jesus (Ἰησοῦς), for he will save (σώσει) his people from their sins".

The fact that Moses' successor Joshua bears the same name as Jesus in the original Greek, Hebrew, and Aramaic has been given theological significance by commentators, as a parallel is often drawn between the two leaders and the etymology of their shared name ('to save'): Joshua leads the Israelites into the Promised Land, while in Christianity Jesus is understood to save both Jews and Gentiles from their sins.

=== Jesus Christ ===
Since the first century, Christians have commonly referred to Jesus as "Jesus Christ". The word Christ is not a given name but was originally a title or office ("the Christ"), meaning 'The Messiah'. The term derives from the Greek Χριστός (Christos), a calque of the Hebrew word משיח mashiakh (Mašiᵃḥ), transliterated into English as messiah. The Hebrew term means 'anointed', from the verb מָשַׁח (mashaḥ), 'to rub with oil, to anoint'. In biblical Judaism, sacred oil was used to anoint certain exceptionally holy people and objects as part of their religious investiture. In the Septuagint, the Hebrew word was rendered into Greek as χριστός (christos), meaning 'anointed', from the verb χρίω (chrio), 'to rub with oil, to anoint'.

Early Christians designated Jesus as "the Christ" because they believed him to be the Messiah (the "anointed one") whose arrival was prophesied in the Hebrew Bible (Old Testament). In post-biblical usage, Christ came to be viewed as a name—one part of "Jesus Christ". The term Christian, meaning a follower of Christ, has been in use since the first century.

== Life and teachings in the New Testament ==
=== Canonical gospels ===
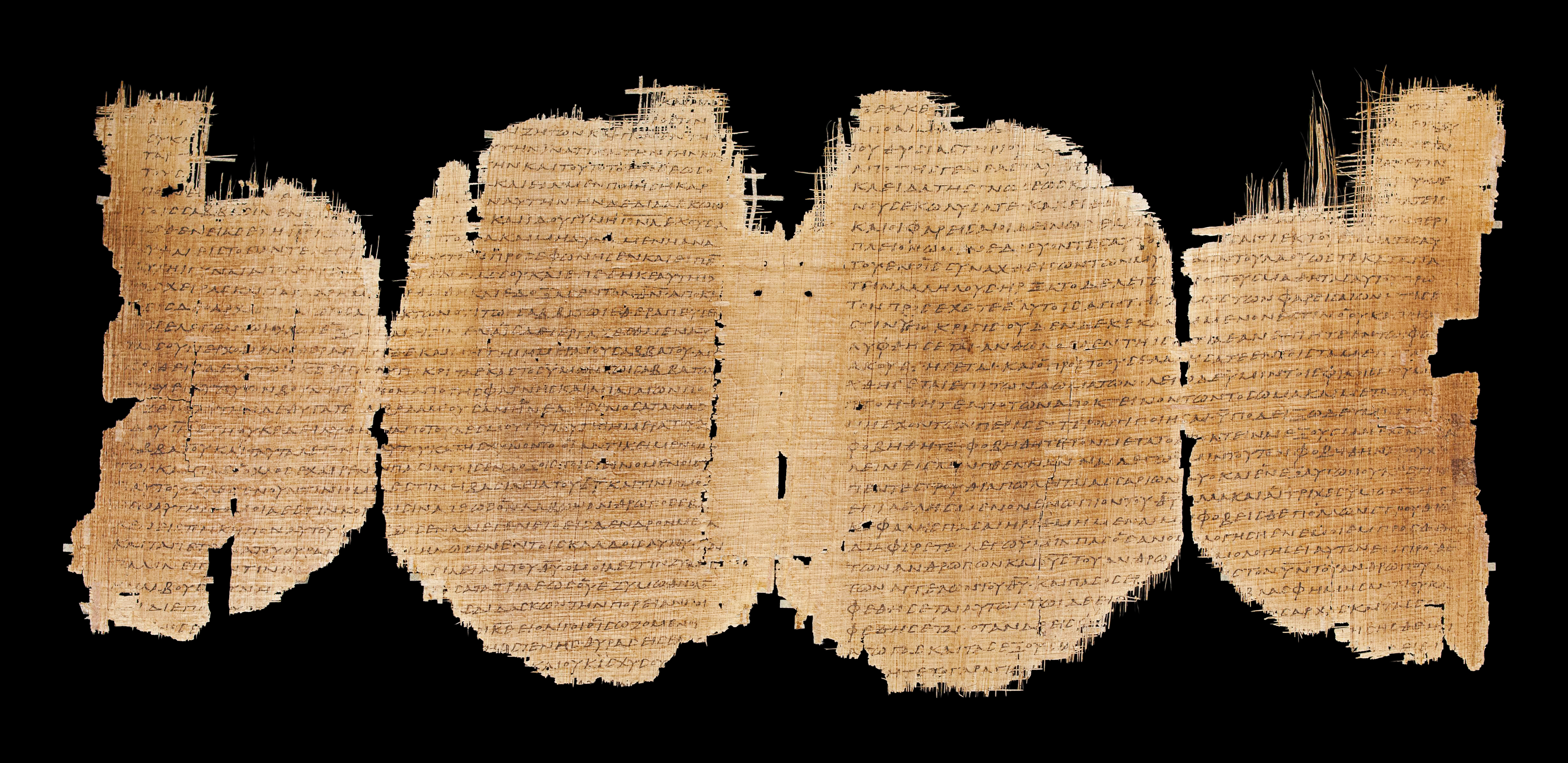
A third-century Greek papyrus of the Gospel of Luke

The four canonical gospels (Matthew, Mark, Luke, and John) are the foremost sources for the life and message of Jesus. Other parts of the New Testament also include references to key episodes in his life, such as the Last Supper in 1 Corinthians 11:23–26. Acts of the Apostles refers to Jesus's early ministry and its anticipation by John the Baptist. Acts 1:1–11 provides more detail about the Ascension of Jesus than the canonical gospels do. In the undisputed Pauline letters, which were written earlier than the gospels, Jesus's words or instructions are cited several times. (Note: Powell writes: "[Paul] does cite words or instructions of Jesus in a few places, but for the most part he displays little interest in the details of Jesus' earthly life and ministry.")

Some early Christian groups had separate descriptions of Jesus's life and teachings that are not included in the New Testament. These include the Gospel of Thomas, Gospel of Peter, Gospel of Judas, the Apocryphon of James, and many other apocryphal writings. Most scholars conclude that these texts were written later and are less historically reliable than the canonical gospels.

==== Authorship, date, and reliability ====
The canonical gospels are four accounts, each attributed to a different author. The authors of the gospels are generally regarded as pseudonymous and are attributed by tradition to the four evangelists, each associated with Jesus or his close followers: Mark by John Mark, an associate of Peter; Matthew to one of Jesus's disciples; Luke to a companion of Paul mentioned in a few epistles; and John to another of Jesus's disciples, the "beloved disciple".

According to Marcan priority, the first to be written was the Gospel of Mark (AD 60–75), followed by the Gospel of Matthew (AD 65–85), the Gospel of Luke (AD 65–95), and the Gospel of John (AD 75–100). Most scholars agree that the authors of Matthew and Luke used Mark as a source for their gospels. Since Matthew and Luke also share some content not found in Mark, many scholars infer that they used a hypothetical Q source in addition to Mark, while a growing number support the Farrer hypothesis or Matthean Posteriority, in which Matthew and Luke used each other directly. Luke and Matthew treat their sources more conservatively than other ancient historians like Diodorus Siculus, though the parallels and variations of the Synoptic gospels are typical of ancient historical biographies.

One important aspect of the study of the gospels is the literary genre under which they fall. Whether the gospel authors set out to write novels, myths, histories, or biographies has a significant impact on how their works ought to be interpreted. Although not without critics, the view that the gospels are a type of ancient biography represents the consensus among scholars today.

Concerning the accuracy of the accounts, viewpoints range from considering them inerrant descriptions of Jesus's life, to doubting their historical reliability on various points, to regarding them as providing very little historical information about his life beyond the basics.

==== Comparative structure and content ====
Matthew, Mark, and Luke are known as the Synoptic Gospels, from the Greek σύν (syn, 'together') and ὄψις (opsis, 'view'), because they are similar in content, narrative arrangement, language, and paragraph structure, and can readily be set side by side for synoptic comparison. Scholars generally agree that it is impossible to find any direct literary relationship between the Synoptic Gospels and the Gospel of John. Many events—such as Jesus's baptism, crucifixion, and interactions with his apostles—appear in the Synoptic Gospels, but incidents such as the transfiguration and Jesus's exorcising demons do not appear in John, which also differs on other matters, such as the cleansing of the Temple.

The Synoptics emphasize different aspects of Jesus. In Mark, Jesus is the Son of God whose mighty works demonstrate the presence of God's Kingdom. He is portrayed as a tireless wonder worker and the servant of both God and humanity. This short gospel records relatively few of Jesus's words or extended teachings. The Gospel of Matthew emphasizes that Jesus is the fulfilment of God's will as revealed in the Old Testament and the Lord of the Church. He is presented as the "Son of David", a "king", and the Messiah. Luke presents Jesus as the divine-human saviour who shows compassion to the needy. He is depicted as the friend of sinners and outcasts, who came to seek and save the lost. This gospel includes well-known parables, such as the Good Samaritan and the Prodigal Son.

The prologue to the Gospel of John identifies Jesus as an incarnation of the divine Word (Logos). As the Word, Jesus is described as eternally present with God, active in all creation, and the source of humanity's moral and spiritual nature. In this gospel, Jesus is portrayed as not only greater than any past human prophet but greater than any prophet could be: he not only speaks God's Word; he is God's Word. In the Gospel of John, Jesus reveals his divine role publicly and is depicted as the Bread of Life, the Light of the World, the True Vine, and more.

The authors of the New Testament generally showed little interest in establishing an absolute chronology of Jesus's life or in synchronizing the episodes of his life with the secular history of the age. As stated in John 21:25, the gospels do not claim to provide an exhaustive list of the events of Jesus's life. The accounts were primarily written as theological documents in the context of early Christianity, with timelines as a secondary consideration. The gospels devote about one third of their text to the last week of Jesus's life in Jerusalem, referred to as the Passion. They do not provide enough detail to satisfy the demands of modern historians regarding exact dates, but it is possible to draw from them a general picture of Jesus's life story.

=== Genealogy and nativity ===
Jesus was Jewish, born to Mary, the wife of Joseph. The Gospels of Matthew and Luke offer two different accounts of his genealogy. Matthew traces Jesus's ancestry to Abraham through David, while Luke traces Jesus's ancestry through Adam to God. The lists are identical between Abraham and David but differ markedly from that point onward; Matthew has 27 generations from David to Joseph, whereas Luke has 42, with almost no overlap between the names on the two lists. (Note: Compare Matthew 1:6–16 with Luke 3:23–31. See also Genealogy of Jesus § Comparison of the two genealogies.) Various theories have been put forward to explain why the two genealogies are so different. (Note: For an overview of such theories, see Genealogy of Jesus § Explanations for divergence.)

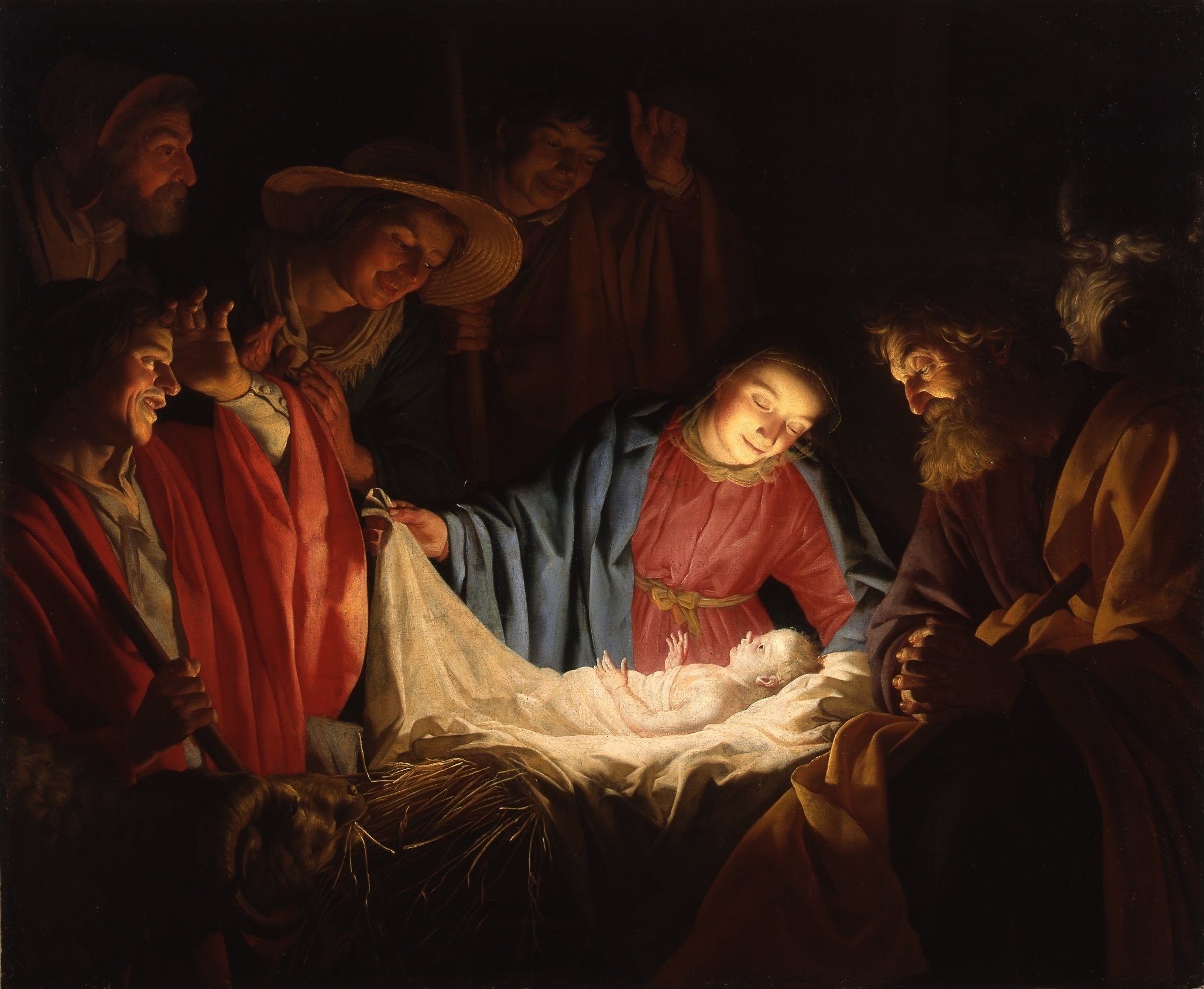
Adoration of the Shepherds by Gerard van Honthorst, 1622

Both Matthew and Luke describe Jesus's birth, particularly that he was born to a virgin named Mary in Bethlehem in fulfilment of prophecy. Luke's account emphasizes events before the birth of Jesus and centres on Mary, while Matthew's mostly covers events after the birth and centres on Joseph. Both accounts state that Mary was engaged to a man named Joseph, who was descended from King David and was not Jesus's biological father, and both support the doctrine of the virgin birth of Jesus, according to which Jesus was miraculously conceived by the Holy Spirit in Mary's womb when she was still a virgin. At the same time, there is evidence, at least in the Lukan Acts of the Apostles, that Jesus was thought to have had, like many figures in antiquity, a dual paternity, since there it is stated that he descended from the seed or loins of David. By taking Jesus as his own son, Joseph is understood to confer on him the necessary Davidic descent. Some scholars suggest that Jesus had Levite heritage from Mary, based on her blood relationship with Elizabeth.

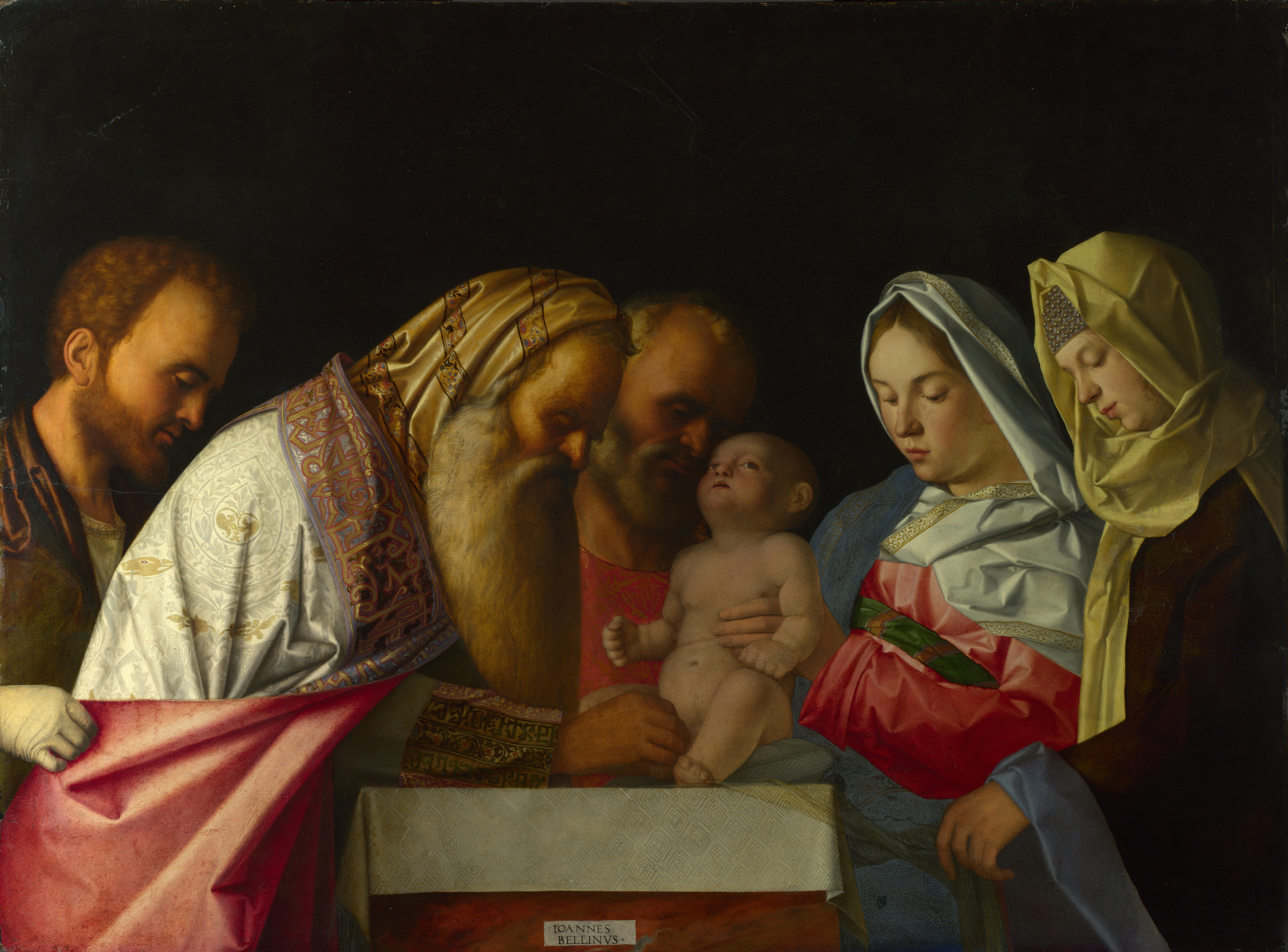
The Circumcision by Giovanni Bellini, c. 1500. The work depicts the circumcision of Jesus.

In Matthew, Joseph is troubled because Mary, his betrothed, is pregnant, but in the first of Joseph's four dreams an angel assures him not to be afraid to take Mary as his wife because her child was conceived by the Holy Spirit. In Matthew 2:1–12, wise men or Magi from the East bring gifts to the young Jesus as the King of the Jews. They find him in a house in Bethlehem. Herod the Great hears of Jesus's birth and, wanting him killed, orders the killings of male infants in Bethlehem and its surroundings. However, an angel warns Joseph in his second dream, and the family flees to Egypt, later returning and settling in Nazareth.

In Luke 1:31–38, Mary learns from the angel Gabriel that she will conceive and bear a child called Jesus through the action of the Holy Spirit. When Mary is due to give birth, she and Joseph travel from Nazareth to Joseph's ancestral home in Bethlehem to register in the census ordered by Caesar Augustus. While there, Mary gives birth to Jesus, and, as they have found no room in the inn, she places the newborn in a manger. An angel announces the birth to a group of shepherds, who go to Bethlehem to see Jesus and subsequently spread the news abroad. Luke 2:21 recounts how Joseph and Mary have their baby circumcised on the eighth day after birth and name him Jesus, as Gabriel had commanded Mary. After the presentation of Jesus at the Temple, Joseph, Mary, and Jesus return to Nazareth.

=== Early life, family, and profession ===
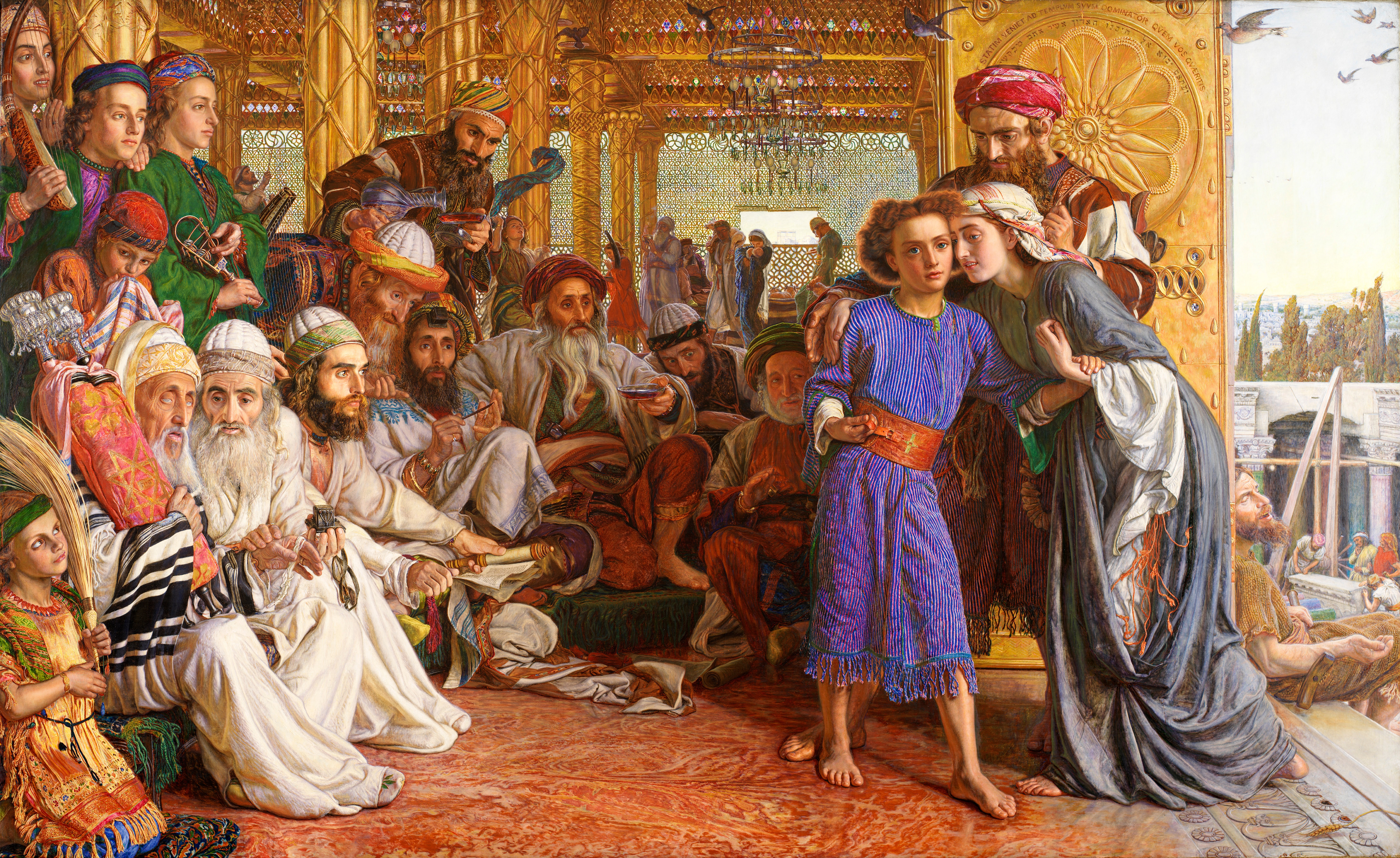
The Finding of the Saviour in the Temple by William Holman Hunt, 1860

Jesus's childhood home is identified in the Gospels of Luke and Matthew as Nazareth, a town in Galilee in present-day Israel, where he lived with his family. Although Joseph appears in descriptions of Jesus's childhood, no mention is made of him thereafter. His other family members, including his mother Mary; his four brothers, James, Joses (or Joseph), Judas, and Simon; and his unnamed sisters, are mentioned in the Gospels and other sources. Jesus's maternal grandparents are named Joachim and Anne in the Gospel of James. The Gospel of Luke records that Mary was a relative of Elizabeth, the mother of John the Baptist. Some extra-biblical contemporary sources consider Jesus and John the Baptist to be second cousins, based on the belief that Elizabeth was the daughter of Sobe, the sister of Anne.

The Gospel of Mark reports that at the beginning of his ministry, Jesus comes into conflict with his neighbours and family. Jesus's mother and brothers come to get him because people are saying that he is out of his mind. Jesus responds that his followers are his true family. In the Gospel of John, Jesus and his mother attend a wedding at Cana, where he performs his first miracle at her request. Later, she is present at his crucifixion, and he expresses concern for her well-being.

Jesus is called a τέκτων (tektōn) in Mark 6:3, a term traditionally understood as "carpenter" but which can also refer to makers of objects in various materials, including builders. Given the term's broad semantic range and "the socio-historical reality of a common Nazarene τέκτων", Matthew K. Robinson, a minister and academic, prefers to translate τέκτων as 'builder-craftsman'. The Gospels indicate that Jesus could read, paraphrase, and debate scripture, but this does not necessarily mean that he received formal scribal training.

The Gospel of Luke reports two journeys of Jesus and his parents in Jerusalem during his childhood. They come to the Temple in Jerusalem for the presentation of Jesus as a baby in accordance with Jewish law, where a man named Simeon prophesies about Jesus and Mary. When Jesus, at the age of twelve, goes missing on a pilgrimage to Jerusalem for Passover, his parents find him in the Temple sitting among the teachers, listening to them and asking questions, and the people are amazed at his understanding and answers. Mary scolds Jesus for going missing, to which Jesus replies that he must "be in his Father's house".

=== Baptism and temptation ===
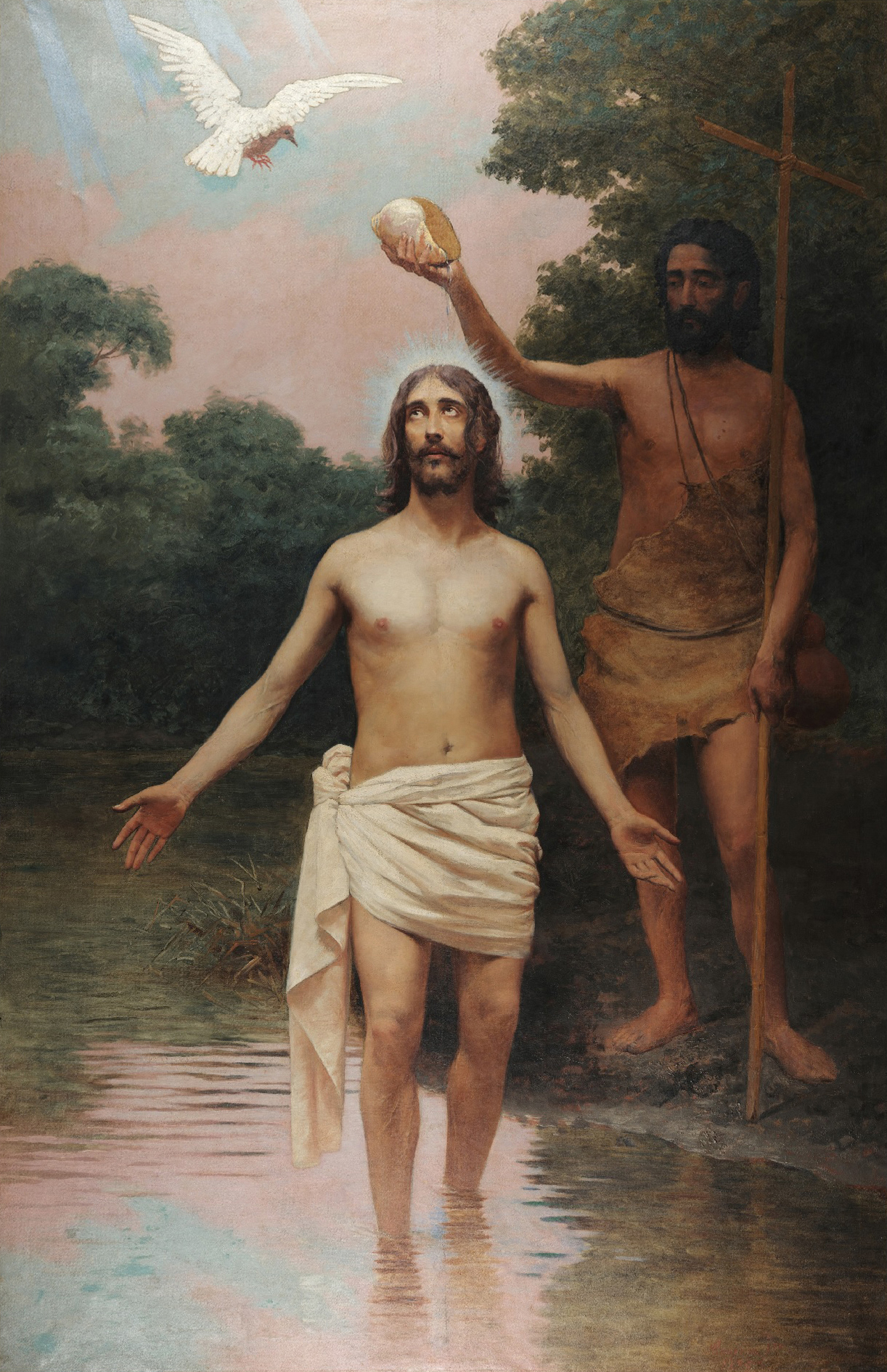
The Baptism of Christ by John the Baptist, by Almeida Júnior, 1895

The synoptic gospels describe Jesus's baptism in the Jordan River and the temptations he faced while spending forty days in the Judaean Desert as a preparation for his public ministry. In each of these accounts, the accounts of Jesus's baptism is preceded by information about John the Baptist. They portray John preaching repentance for the forgiveness of sins, encouraging the giving of alms to the poor, baptizing people in the region of the Jordan River around Perea, and foretelling the arrival of someone "more powerful" than he.

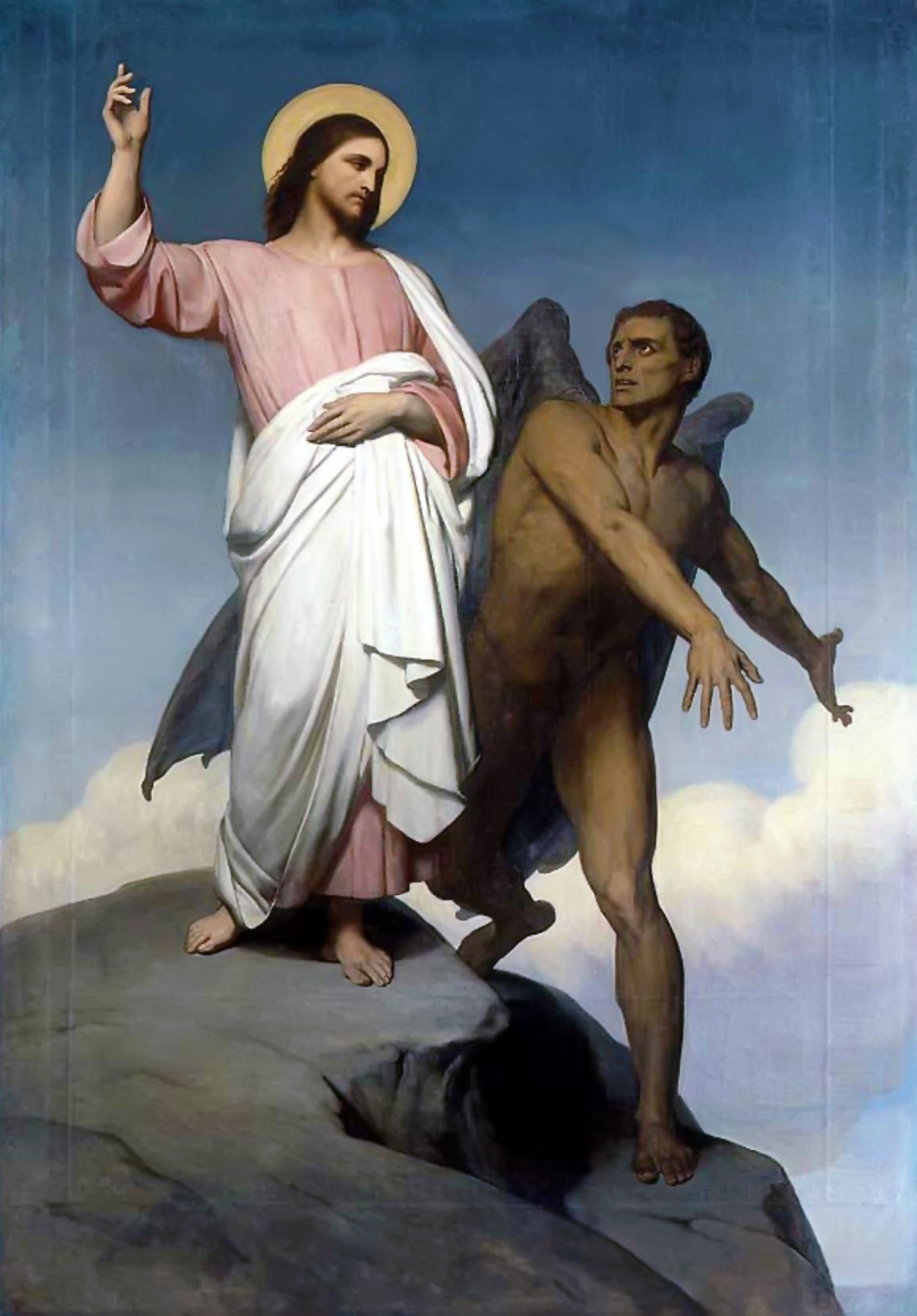
Jesus and the Devil depicted in The Temptation of Christ, by Ary Scheffer, 1854

In the Gospel of Mark, John the Baptist baptizes Jesus, and as Jesus comes up out of the water he sees the Holy Spirit descending on him like a dove, and a voice comes from heaven and declares him to be God's Son. This is one of two events described in the Gospels where a voice from Heaven refers to Jesus as "Son", the other being the Transfiguration. The Spirit then drives him into the wilderness, where he is tempted by Satan. After John's arrest, Jesus begins his ministry in Galilee.

In the Gospel of Matthew, when Jesus comes to John to be baptized, John protests, saying, "I need to be baptized by you." Jesus instructs him to proceed with the baptism "to fulfil all righteousness". Matthew then narrates three specific temptations that Satan offers Jesus in the wilderness. In the Gospel of Luke, the Holy Spirit descends in bodily form like a dove after all the people have been baptized and while Jesus is praying. Later, John implicitly acknowledges Jesus by sending his followers to inquire about him. Luke also describes three temptations experienced by Jesus in the wilderness before he begins his ministry in Galilee.

The Gospel of John does not narrate Jesus's baptism and temptation. Instead, John the Baptist testifies that he saw the Spirit descend and remain on Jesus. John publicly proclaims Jesus as the Lamb of God, and some of John's followers become disciples of Jesus. Before John is imprisoned, Jesus leads his followers to baptize, and they baptize more people than John.

=== Public ministry ===
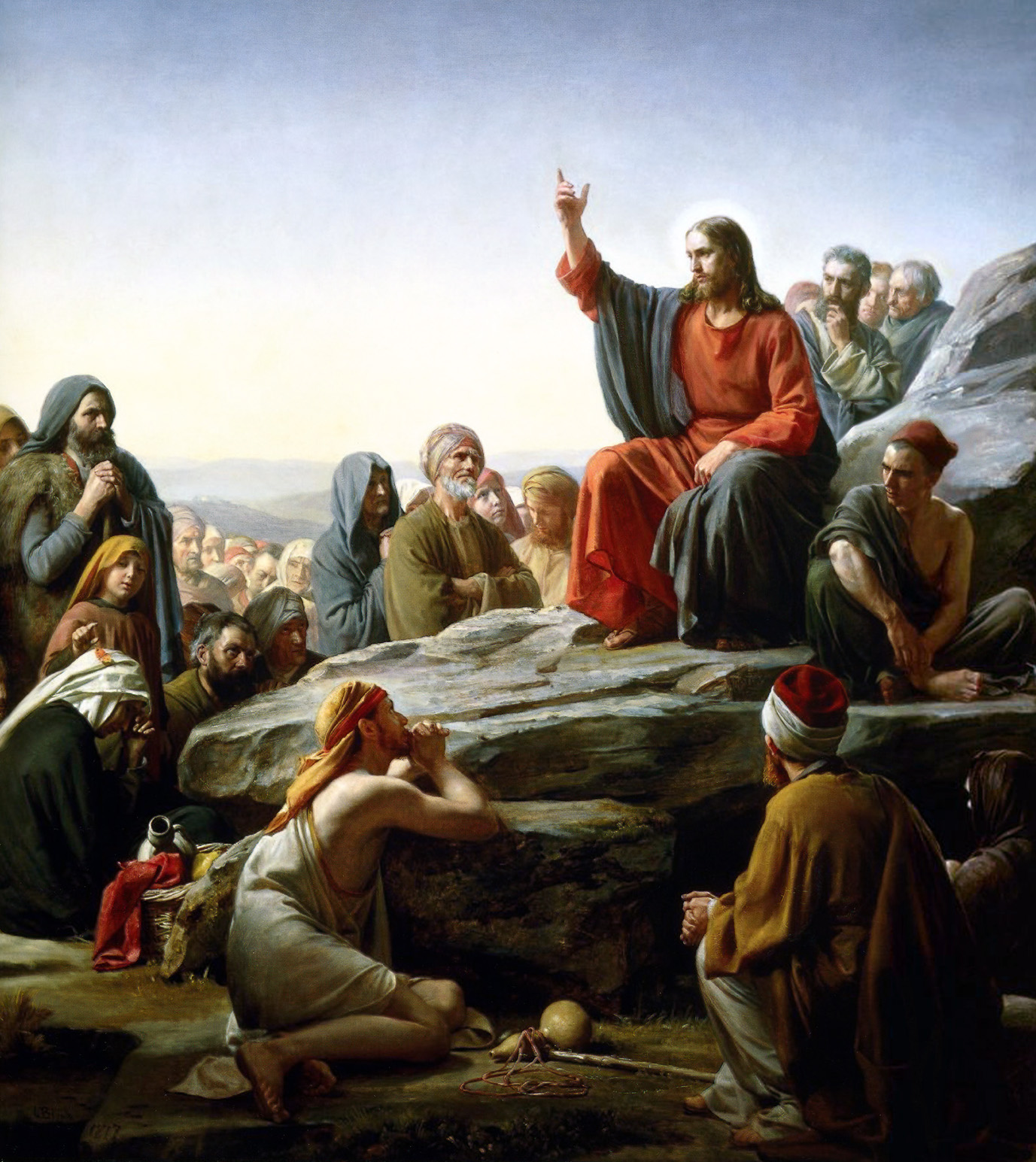
Sermon on the Mount, by Carl Bloch, 1877, depicts Jesus's important discourse.

The Synoptics depict two main geographical settings in Jesus's ministry. The first takes place in Galilee, north of Judea, where Jesus conducts a largely successful ministry; the second occurs in Jerusalem, where he is rejected and killed. Often referred to as "rabbi", Jesus delivers his message orally. In these accounts, he forbids those who recognize him as the messiah—including people he heals and demons he is said to exorcise—to speak about it (see Messianic Secret). By contrast, the Gospel of John portrays Jesus's ministry as taking place primarily in and around Jerusalem rather than in Galilee, and his divine nature is more openly proclaimed and recognized.

Scholars commonly divide the ministry of Jesus into several stages. The Galilean ministry begins when Jesus returns to Galilee from the Judaean Desert after resisting the temptations of Satan. He then preaches throughout Galilee, and in Matthew 4:18–20, his first disciples—who will later form the core of the early Church—encounter him and begin to follow him. This period includes the Sermon on the Mount, one of Jesus's major discourses, as well as the calming of the storm, the feeding of the 5,000, walking on water, and various other miracles and parables. It concludes with the Confession of Peter and the Transfiguration.

As Jesus travels towards Jerusalem, during what is often called the Perean ministry, he returns to the region where he was baptized, roughly a third of the way down from the Sea of Galilee along the Jordan River. The final phase of his ministry, In Jerusalem, begins with his triumphal entry into the city on Palm Sunday. In the Synoptic Gospels, during that week Jesus drives the money changers from the Second Temple, and Judas bargains to betray him. This period culminates in the Last Supper and, in the Johannine account, the Farewell Discourse.

==== Disciples and followers ====
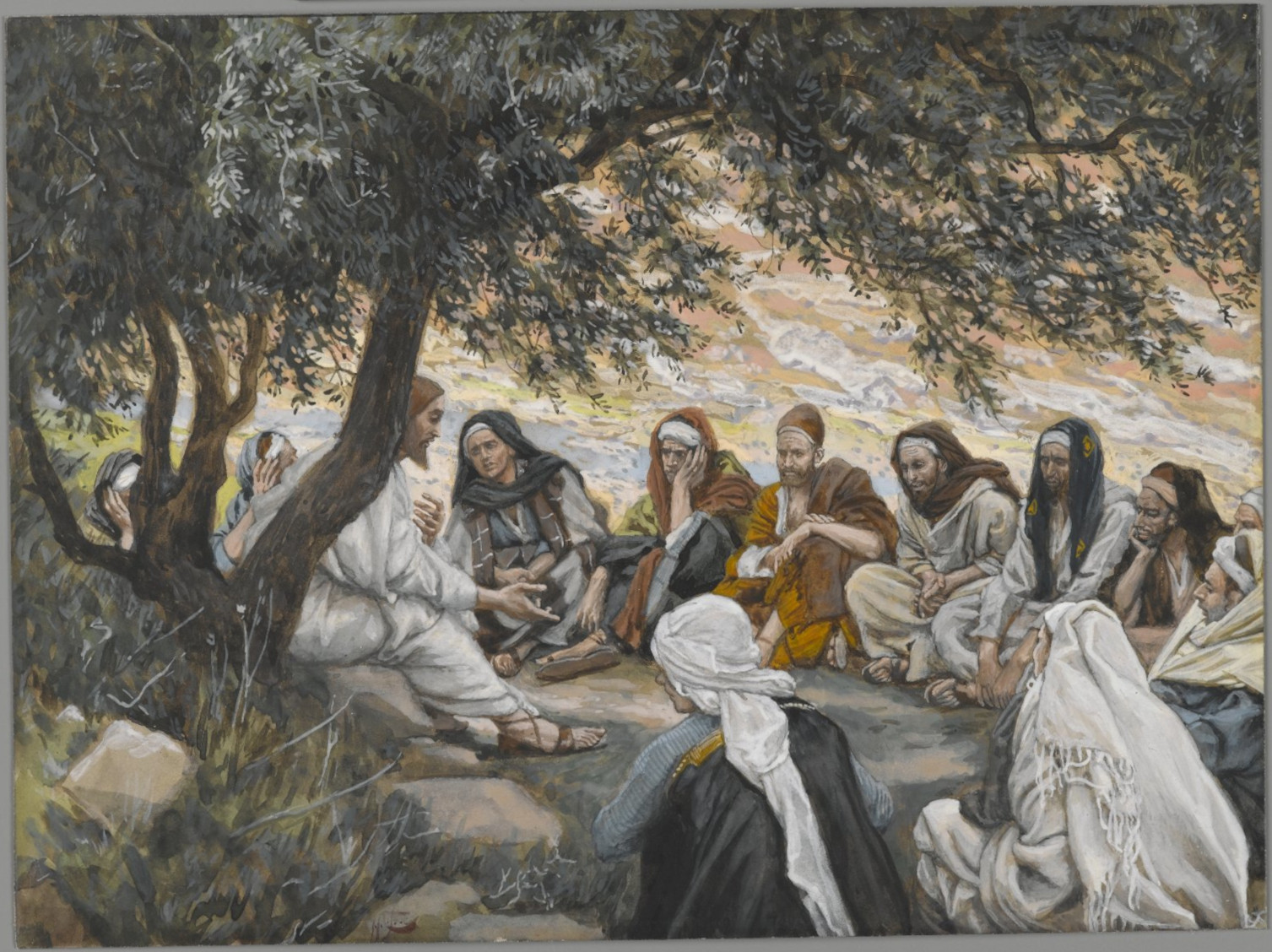
The Exhortation to the Apostles, by James Tissot, portrays Jesus talking to his twelve disciples.

Near the beginning of his ministry, Jesus appoints twelve apostles. In Matthew and Mark, Jesus calls his first four apostles, who are fishermen, and they are described as immediately leaving their nets to follow him. In John, Jesus's first two apostles are initially disciples of John the Baptist; the Baptist sees Jesus and calls him the Lamb of God, and the two, hearing this, begin to follow Jesus. In addition to the Twelve Apostles, the introduction of the Sermon on the Plain in Luke identifies a much larger group of people as disciples. In Luke 10:1–16, Jesus sends 70 or 72 of his followers out in pairs to prepare towns for his prospective visits; they are instructed to accept hospitality, heal the sick, and proclaim the Kingdom of God.

==== Teachings and miracles ====
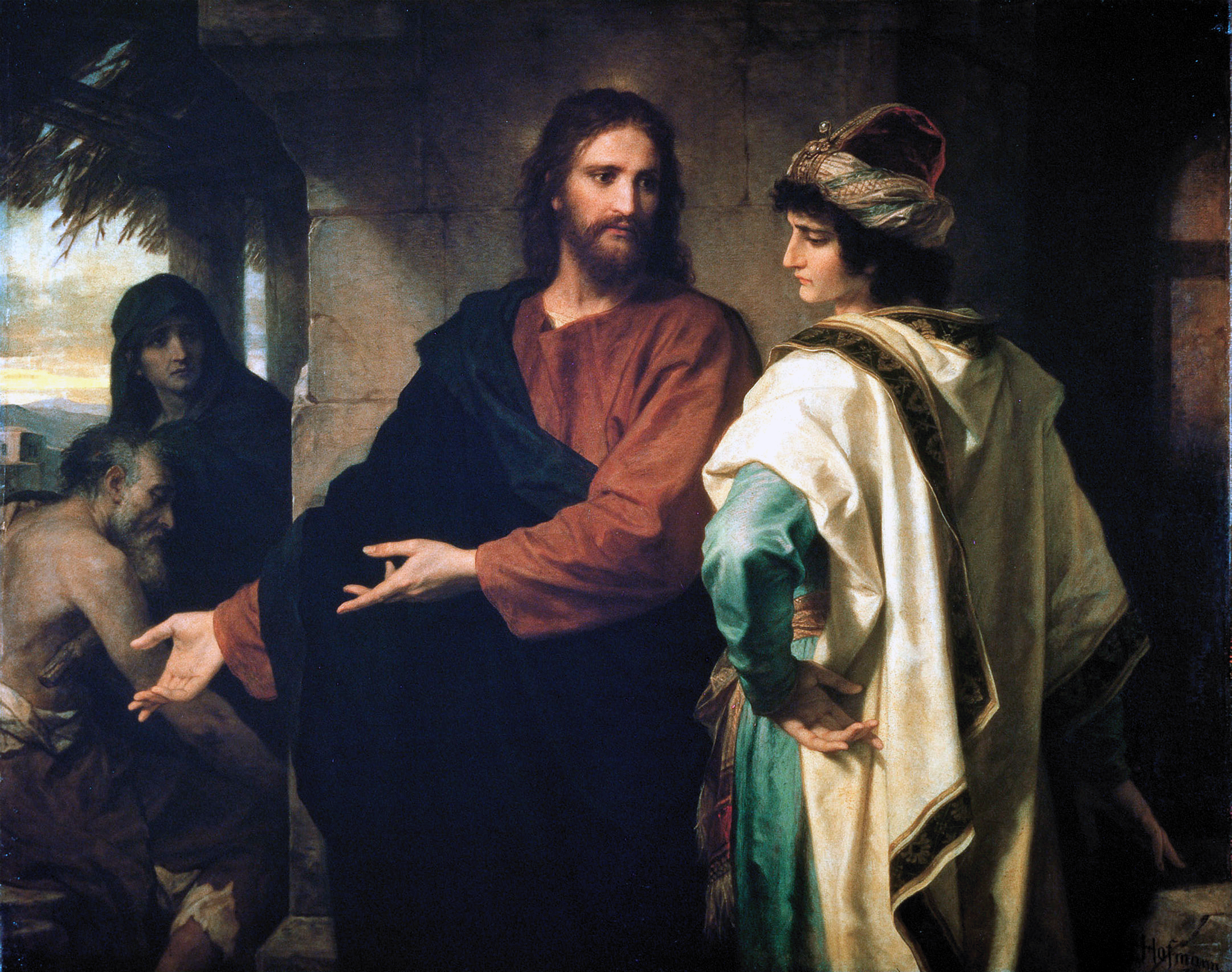
Jesus and the rich young man by Heinrich Hofmann, 1889

In the Synoptics, Jesus teaches extensively—often in parables—about the Kingdom of God. Jesus also speaks of the "Son of Man", an apocalyptic figure who will come to gather the chosen. Jesus calls people to repent of their sins and to devote themselves wholly to God. He instructs his followers to observe Jewish law, although he is perceived by some contemporaries as having broken the law himself, for example in relation to Sabbath observance. When asked what the greatest commandment is, Jesus replies: "You shall love the Lord your God with all your heart, and with all your soul, and with all your mind ... And a second is like it: 'You shall love your neighbour as yourself.'" Other ethical teachings attributed to Jesus include loving one's enemies, refraining from hatred and lust, turning the other cheek, and forgiving those who have sinned against oneself.

The Gospel of John presents the teachings of Jesus not merely as his own preaching but as divine revelation. John the Baptist, for example, states in John 3:34: "He whom God has sent speaks the words of God, for he gives the Spirit without measure." In John 7:16, Jesus says, "My teaching is not mine but his who sent me." He reiterates this in John 14:10: "Do you not believe that I am in the Father and the Father is in me? The words that I say to you I do not speak on my own; but the Father who dwells in me does his works."

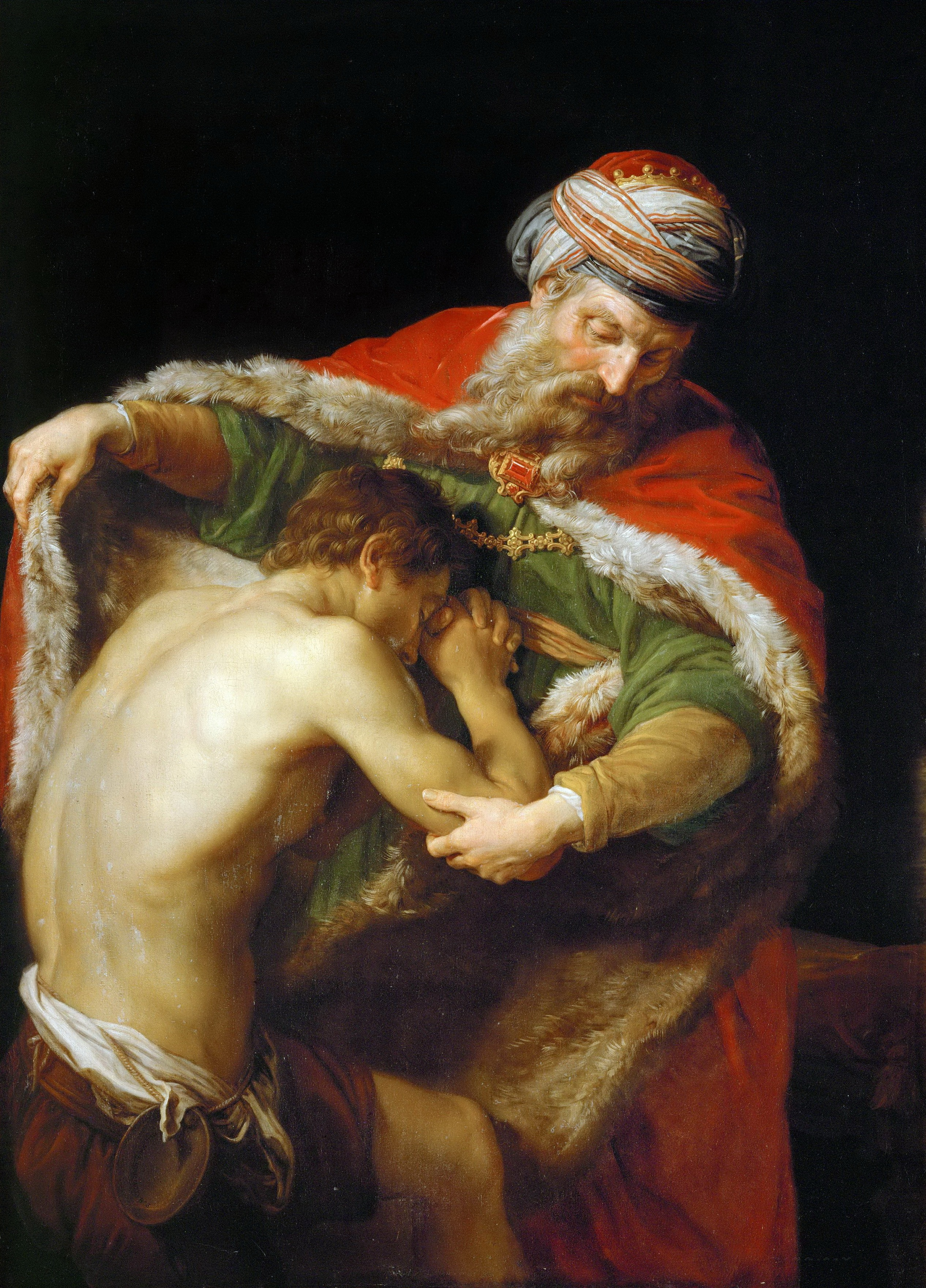
The Return of the Prodigal Son by Pompeo Batoni, 1773

Approximately 30 parables constitute about one-third of Jesus's recorded teachings. The parables appear both within longer sermons and at various other places in the narrative. They often contain symbolism and typically relate aspects of the physical world to spiritual realities. Common themes include the kindness and generosity of God, as well as the dangers and consequences of transgression. Some parables, such as that of the Prodigal Son, are relatively straightforward, while others, such as the Growing Seed, are more complex, profound, and difficult to interpret. When his disciples ask why he speaks to the people in parables, Jesus replies that the chosen disciples have been granted "to know the secrets of the kingdom of heaven", unlike the rest, adding: "For the one who has will be given more and he will have in abundance. But the one who does not have will be deprived even more", and he goes on to say that most of their generation have developed "dull hearts" and are therefore unable to understand.

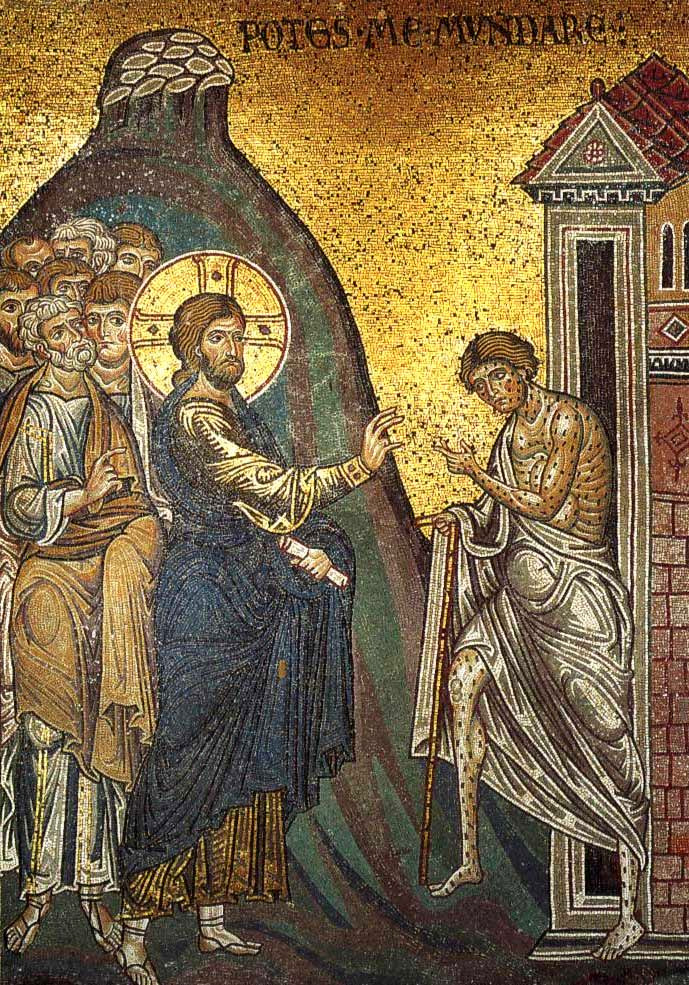
Jesus cleansing a leper, mediaeval mosaic from the Monreale Cathedral, late 12th to mid-13th centuries

In the gospel accounts, Jesus devotes a substantial portion of his ministry to performing miracles, especially healings. These miracles are commonly classified into two main categories: healing miracles and nature miracles. The healing miracles include cures of physical ailments, exorcisms, and the raising of the dead. The nature miracles demonstrate authority over the natural world and include turning water into wine, walking on water, and calming a storm, among others. Jesus attributes his miracles to a divine source. When opponents accuse him of casting out demons by the power of Beelzebub, the prince of demons, he replies that he does so by the "Spirit of God" (Matthew 12:28) or "finger of God", arguing that it would be illogical for Satan to undermine his own domain; he also asks, if he exorcises by Beelzebub, "by whom do your sons cast them out?" In Matthew 12:31–32, he further states that while all kinds of sin, including "insults against God" or "insults against the Son of Man", may be forgiven, blasphemy against "The Holy Spirit" will never be forgiven, and those guilty of it bear their sin permanently.

In John, Jesus's miracles are described as "signs", performed to manifest his mission and identity. In the Synoptic Gospels, when some teachers of the law and Pharisees ask him for a miraculous sign to validate his authority, Jesus refuses, saying that no sign will be given to a corrupt and evil generation except the sign of the prophet Jonah. In the Synoptics, the crowds typically respond to his miracles with awe and press upon him to heal their sick, whereas in John, Jesus is depicted as less constrained by the crowds, who often respond to his signs with belief and trust. A feature common to all the miracle narratives is that Jesus performs them freely regardless of an individual's social class and does not request or accept payment. The miracle stories are frequently interwoven with teachings, and the miracles themselves often carry a didactic dimension. Many emphasize the importance of faith: in the cleansing of ten lepers and the raising of Jairus's daughter, for instance, the beneficiaries are told that their healing is due to their faith.

In A Marginal Jew, scholar John P. Meier argues that "the miracle traditions about Jesus' public ministry are already so widely attested in various sources" that any "total fabrication by the early church is, practically speaking, impossible". He bases this claim on literary sources such as the Gospels of Matthew, Luke, and John, as well as on the writings of the historian Josephus. Meier contends that the "criterion of multiple attestation of sources and forms" supports the conclusion that Jesus performed "extraordinary deeds" which his contemporaries regarded as miracles.

Scholar Paul J. Achtemeier argues that such miracles were not unique to Jesus in the ancient world and were perceived as ambiguous even by eyewitnesses. He notes that Jesus likely performed acts understood as exorcisms, which were "accepted as reality by his contemporaries", but that these should not be seen as having "probative value with respect to Jesus," since witnesses could claim that he was working with either Satan or God. Scholar Gregory Sterling observes that, in the case of Jesus's alleged exorcisms, "For first-century Galileans who believed in the personal presence of evil in the form of demons, Jesus' act was a validation of his ministry."

==== Proclamation, Transfiguration, and Passion Week ====
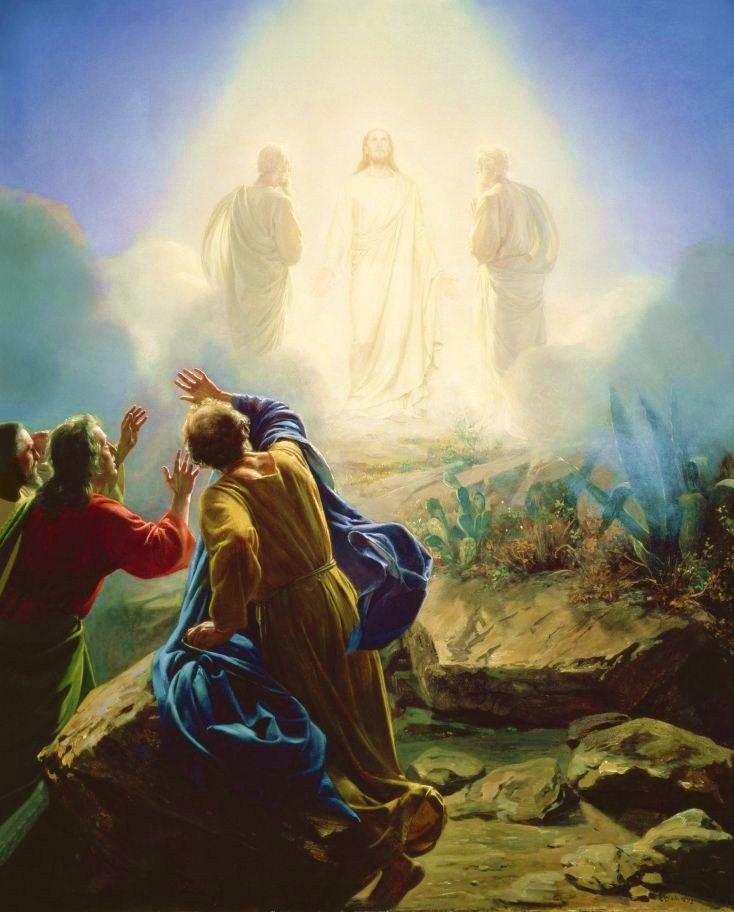
The Transfiguration of Jesus, depicted by Carl Bloch, 19th century

At approximately the midpoint of each of the three Synoptic Gospels, two significant events are narrated: the Confession of Peter and the Transfiguration of Jesus—not mentioned in the Gospel of John. In the Confession of Peter, Peter declares to Jesus, "You are the Messiah, the Son of the living God"; Jesus affirms that this is a divinely revealed truth. Following this confession, Jesus begins to tell his disciples about his forthcoming suffering, death, and resurrection. In the Transfiguration, Jesus takes Peter and two other apostles up an unnamed mountain, where "he was transfigured before them, and his face shone like the sun, and his clothes became dazzling white". A bright cloud envelops them, and a voice from the cloud proclaims, "This is my Son, the Beloved; with him I am well pleased; listen to him."

The description of the final week of Jesus's life—often referred to as Passion Week—occupies roughly one-third of the narrative in the canonical gospels. This section begins with Jesus's triumphal entry into Jerusalem and concludes with his crucifixion.

==== Activities in Jerusalem ====
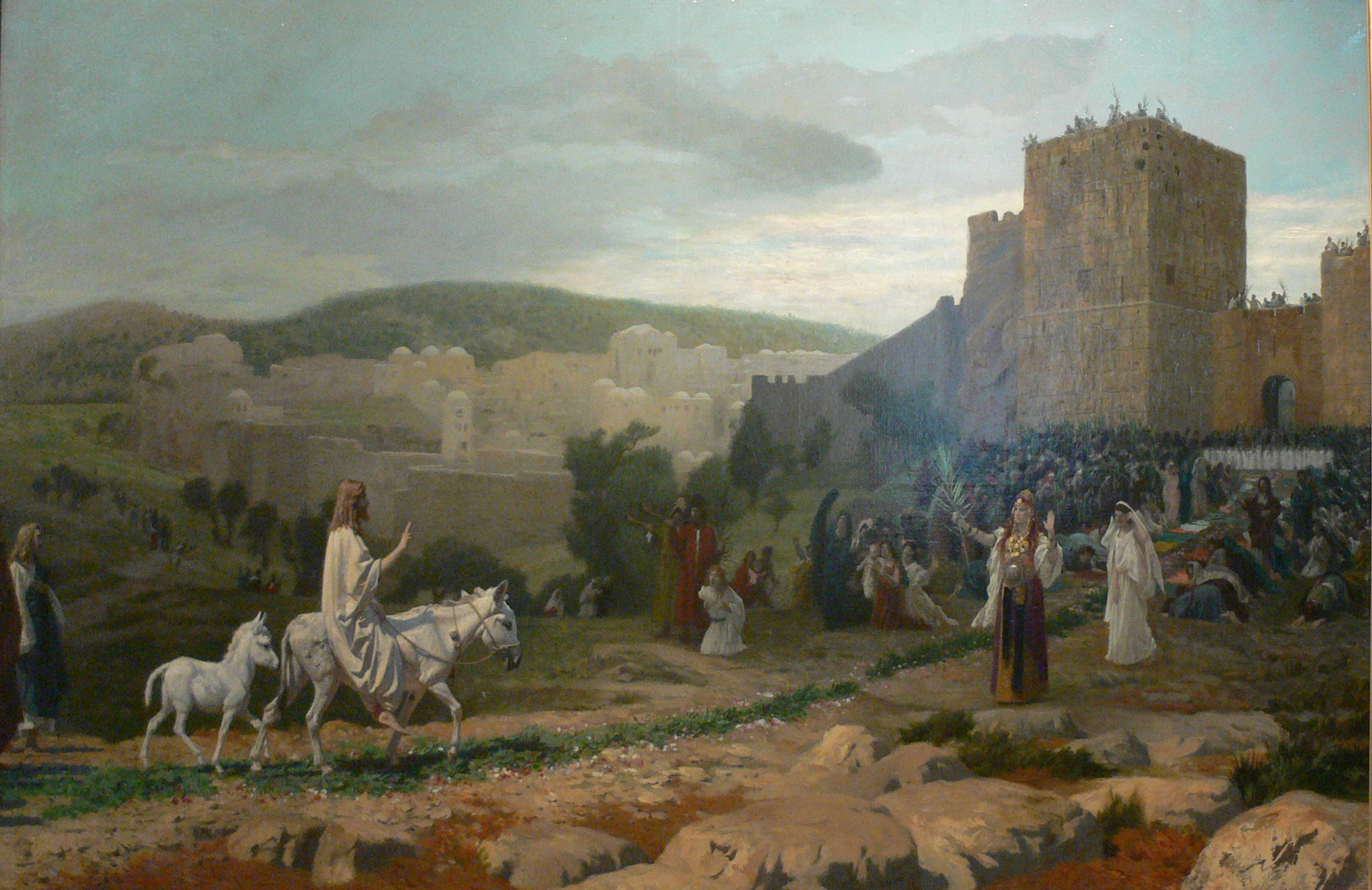
A painting of Jesus's final entry into Jerusalem, by Jean-Léon Gérôme, 1897

In the Synoptic Gospels, the final week in Jerusalem concludes the journey through Perea and Judea that Jesus began in Galilee. Jesus enters Jerusalem riding a young donkey, evoking the motif of the Messiah's donkey from the Book of Zechariah, in which the humble king of the Jews comes to the city in this manner. As he proceeds, people spread cloaks and small branches of trees (palm fronds) on the road before him and chant lines from Psalm 118:25–26.

Jesus next expels the money changers from the Temple, accusing them of turning it into a den of thieves through their commercial activities. Most scholars agree that it is overwhelmingly likely that Jesus did something in the temple and mentioned its destruction. In John, the Cleansing of the Temple occurs at the beginning of Jesus's ministry instead of at the end. Ancient compositional practices involved such chronological displacement and compression, with even reliable biographers like Plutarch displaying them.

Jesus comes into conflict with the Jewish elders, such as when they question his authority and when he criticizes them and calls them hypocrites. Judas Iscariot, one of the twelve apostles, secretly strikes a bargain with the Jewish elders, agreeing to betray Jesus to them for 30 silver coins.

The Gospel of John recounts two other feasts in which Jesus taught in Jerusalem before the Passion Week. In Bethany, a village near Jerusalem, Jesus raises Lazarus from the dead. This potent sign increases the tension with authorities, who conspire to kill him. Mary of Bethany anoints Jesus's feet, foreshadowing his entombment. Jesus then makes his messianic entry into Jerusalem. The cheering crowds greeting Jesus as he enters Jerusalem add to the animosity between him and the establishment. In John, Jesus has already cleansed the Second Temple during an earlier Passover visit to Jerusalem. John next recounts Jesus's Last Supper with his disciples.

==== Last Supper ====
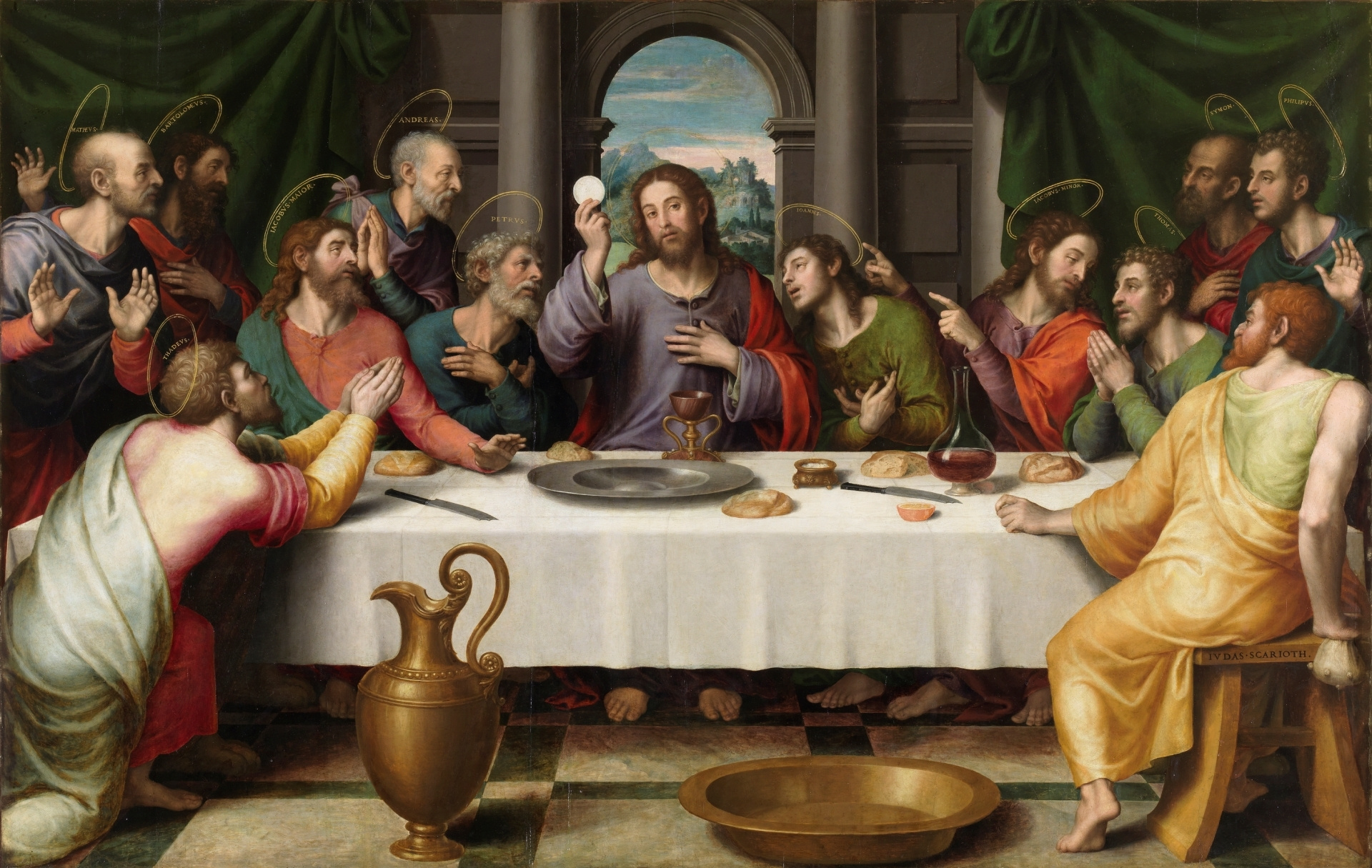
The Last Supper, depicted by Juan de Juanes, c. 1562

The Last Supper is the final meal that Jesus shared with his twelve apostles in Jerusalem before his crucifixion. The Last Supper is mentioned in all four canonical gospels; Paul's First Epistle to the Corinthians also refers to it. During the meal, Jesus predicts that one of his apostles will betray him. Despite each Apostle's assertion that he would not betray him, Jesus reiterates that the betrayer would be one of those present. Matthew 26:23–25 and John 13:26–27 identify Judas as the traitor.

In the Synoptics, Jesus takes bread, breaks it, and gives it to the disciples, saying, "This is my body, which is given for you." He then has them all drink from a cup, saying, "This cup that is poured out for you is the new covenant in my blood." The Christian sacrament or ordinance of the Eucharist is based on these events. Although the Gospel of John does not include a description of the bread-and-wine ritual during the Last Supper, most scholars agree that John 6:22–59 (the Bread of Life Discourse) has a eucharistic character and resonates with the institution narratives in the Synoptic Gospels and in the Pauline writings on the Last Supper.

In all four gospels, Jesus predicts that Peter will deny knowledge of him three times before the cock crows the next morning. In Luke and John, the prediction is made during the Supper. In Matthew and Mark, the prediction is made after the Supper; Jesus also predicts that all his disciples will desert him. The Gospel of John provides the only account of Jesus washing his disciples' feet after the meal. John also includes a long sermon by Jesus, preparing his disciples (now without Judas) for his departure. Chapters 14–17 of the Gospel of John are known as the Farewell Discourse and are a significant source of Christological content.

==== Agony in the Garden, betrayal, and arrest ====
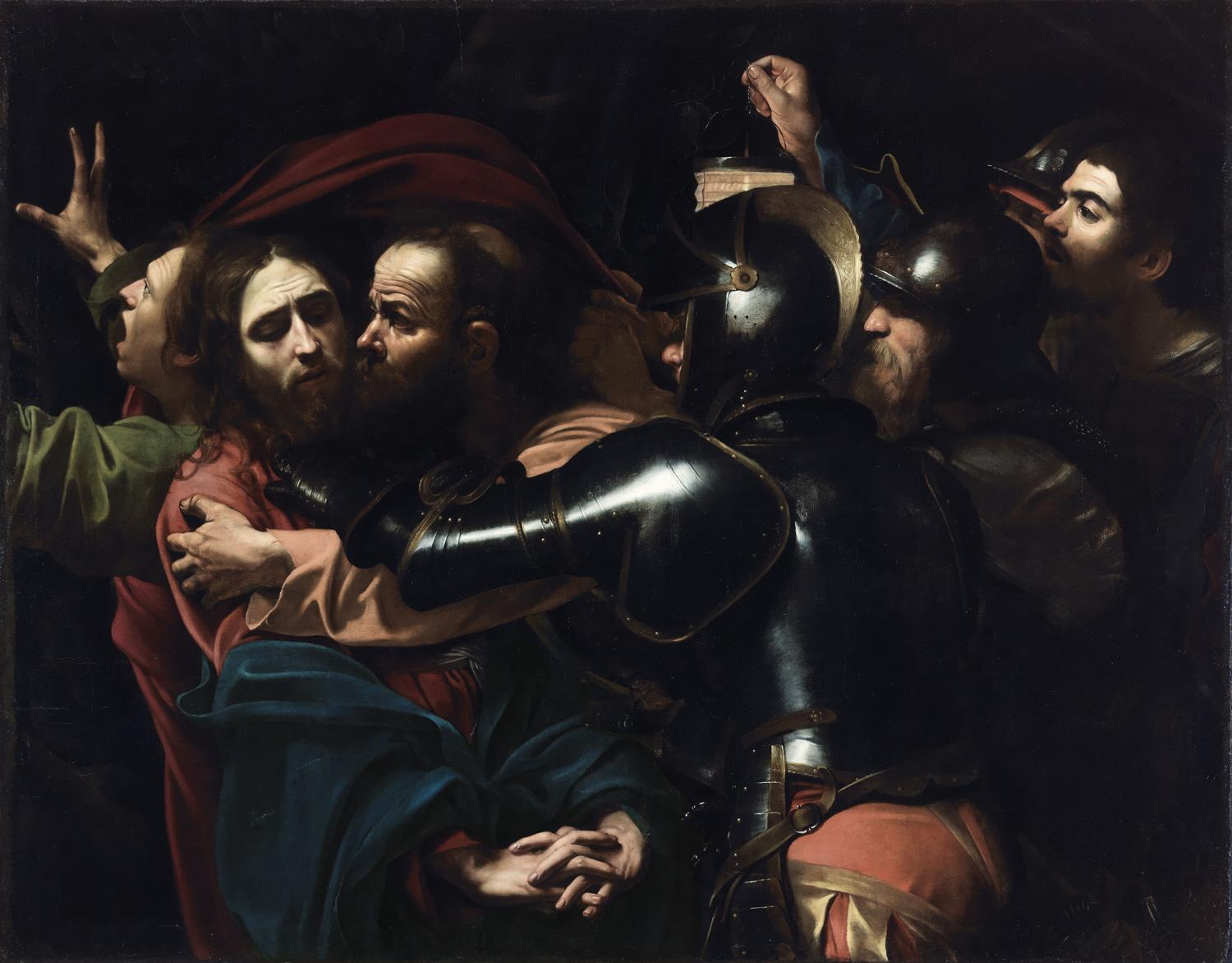
A depiction of the kiss of Judas and arrest of Jesus, by Caravaggio, c. 1602

In the Synoptics, Jesus and his disciples go to the garden Gethsemane, where Jesus prays to be spared his coming ordeal. Then Judas comes with an armed mob, sent by the chief priests, scribes and elders. He kisses Jesus to identify him to the crowd, which then arrests Jesus. In an attempt to stop them, an unnamed disciple of Jesus uses a sword to cut off the ear of a man in the crowd. After Jesus's arrest, his disciples go into hiding, and Peter, when questioned, thrice denies knowing Jesus. After the third denial, Peter hears the cock crow and recalls Jesus's prediction about his denial. Peter then weeps bitterly.

In John 18:1–11, Jesus does not pray to be spared his crucifixion, as the gospel portrays him as scarcely touched by such human weakness. The people who arrest him are Roman soldiers and Temple guards. Instead of being betrayed by a kiss, Jesus proclaims his identity, and when he does, the soldiers and officers fall to the ground. The gospel identifies Peter as the disciple who used the sword, and Jesus rebukes him for it.

==== Trials by the Sanhedrin, Herod, and Pilate ====
After his arrest, Jesus is taken late at night to the private residence of the high priest, Caiaphas, who had been installed by Pilate's predecessor, the Roman procurator Valerius Gratus. The Sanhedrin was a Jewish judicial body. The gospel accounts differ on the details of the trials. In Matthew 26:57, Mark 14:53, and Luke 22:54, Jesus is taken to the house of the high priest, Caiaphas, where he is mocked and beaten that night. Early the next morning, the chief priests and scribes lead Jesus away into their council. John 18:12–14 states that Jesus is first taken to Annas, Caiaphas's father-in-law, and then to the high priest.

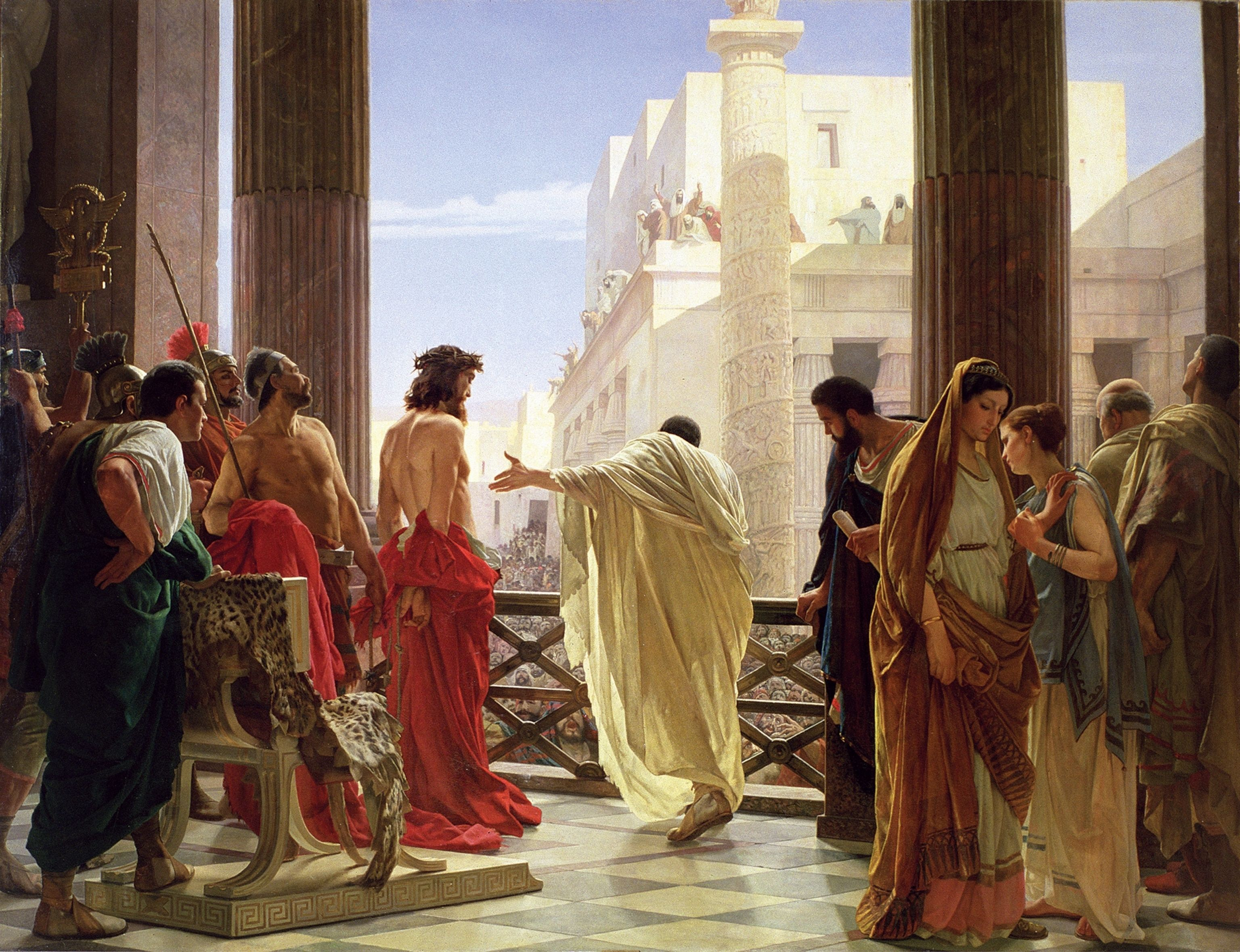
Ecce homo! Antonio Ciseri's 1871 depiction of Pontius Pilate presenting Jesus to the public

During the trials Jesus speaks very little, mounts no defence, and gives very infrequent and indirect answers to the priests' questions, prompting an officer to slap him. In Matthew 26:62, Jesus's unresponsiveness leads Caiaphas to ask him, "Have you no answer?". In Mark 14:61, the high priest then asks Jesus, "Are you the Messiah, the Son of the Blessed One?". Jesus replies, "I am", and then predicts the coming of the Son of Man. This provokes Caiaphas to tear his own robe in anger and to accuse Jesus of blasphemy. In Matthew and Luke, Jesus's answer is more ambiguous: in Matthew 26:64, he responds, "You have said so", and in Luke 22:70 he says, "You say that I am."

The Jewish elders take Jesus to Pilate's Court and ask the Roman governor, Pontius Pilate, to judge and condemn Jesus for various allegations: subverting the nation, opposing the payment of tribute, claiming to be Christ, a king, and claiming to be the son of God. (Note: Matthew: "claiming to be king of the Jews". Mark: "King of the Jews". Luke: "subverting nation, opposing payment of taxes to Caesar, claiming to be Christ, a king" John: "breaking Jewish law, claiming to be the son of God".) The use of the word "king" is central to the discussion between Jesus and Pilate. In John 18:36, Jesus states, "My kingdom is not from this world", but he does not unequivocally deny being the King of the Jews. In Luke 23:7–15, Pilate realizes that Jesus is a Galilean, and thus comes under the jurisdiction of Herod Antipas, the Tetrarch of Galilee and Perea. Pilate sends Jesus to Herod to be tried, but Jesus says almost nothing in response to Herod's questions. Herod and his soldiers mock Jesus, put an expensive robe on him to make him look like a king, and return him to Pilate, who then calls together the Jewish elders and announces that he has "not found this man guilty".

Observing a Passover custom of the time, Pilate allows one prisoner chosen by the crowd to be released. He gives the people a choice between Jesus and a murderer called Barabbas (בר-אבא or Bar-abbâ, "son of the father", from the common given name Abba: 'father'). Persuaded by the elders, the mob chooses to release Barabbas and crucify Jesus. Pilate writes a sign in Hebrew, Latin, and Greek that reads "Jesus of Nazareth, the King of the Jews" (abbreviated as INRI in depictions) to be affixed to Jesus's cross, then scourges Jesus and sends him to be crucified. The soldiers place a crown of thorns on Jesus's head and ridicule him as the King of the Jews. They beat and taunt him before taking him to Calvary, also called Golgotha, for crucifixion.

==== Crucifixion and entombment ====
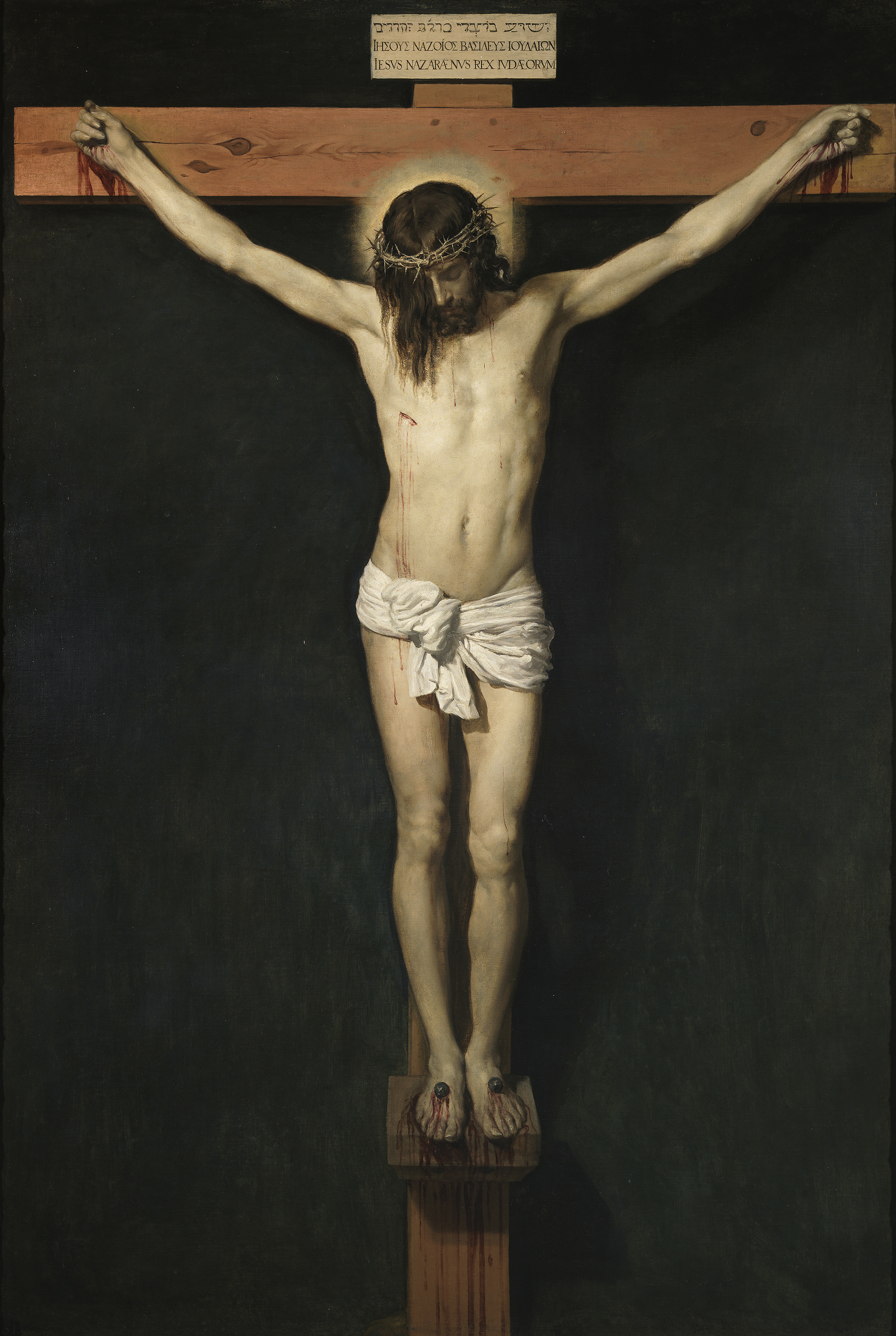
Diego Velázquez's depiction of the Crucifixion, approx. 1632

Jesus's crucifixion is described in all four canonical gospels. After the trials, Jesus is led to Calvary carrying his cross; the route traditionally thought to have been taken is known as the Via Dolorosa. The three Synoptic Gospels indicate that Simon of Cyrene assists him, having been compelled by the Romans to do so. In Luke 23:27–28, Jesus tells the women in the multitude of people following him not to weep for him but for themselves and their children. At Calvary, Jesus is offered a sponge soaked in a concoction usually offered as a painkiller. According to Matthew and Mark, he refuses it.

The soldiers then crucify Jesus and cast lots for his clothes. Above Jesus's head on the cross is Pilate's multilingual inscription, "Jesus of Nazareth, the King of the Jews." Soldiers and passersby mock him about it. Two convicted thieves are crucified along with Jesus. In Matthew and Mark, both thieves mock Jesus. In Luke, one of them rebukes Jesus, while the other defends him. Jesus tells the latter: "today you will be with me in Paradise." The four gospels mention the presence of a group of female disciples of Jesus at the crucifixion. In John, Jesus sees his mother Mary and the beloved disciple and tells him to take care of her.

In John 19:33–34, Roman soldiers break the two thieves' legs to hasten their death, but not those of Jesus, as he is already dead. Instead, one soldier pierces Jesus's side with a lance, and blood and water flow out. The Synoptics report a period of darkness, and the heavy curtain in the Temple is torn when Jesus dies. In Matthew 27:51–54, an earthquake breaks open tombs. In Matthew and Mark, terrified by the events, a Roman centurion states that Jesus was the Son of God.

On the same day, Joseph of Arimathea, with Pilate's permission and with Nicodemus's help, removes Jesus's body from the cross, wraps it in a clean cloth, and buries it in a new rock-hewn tomb. In Matthew 27:62–66, on the following day the chief Jewish priests ask Pilate for the tomb to be secured, and with Pilate's permission the priests place seals on the large stone covering the entrance.

=== Resurrection and ascension ===
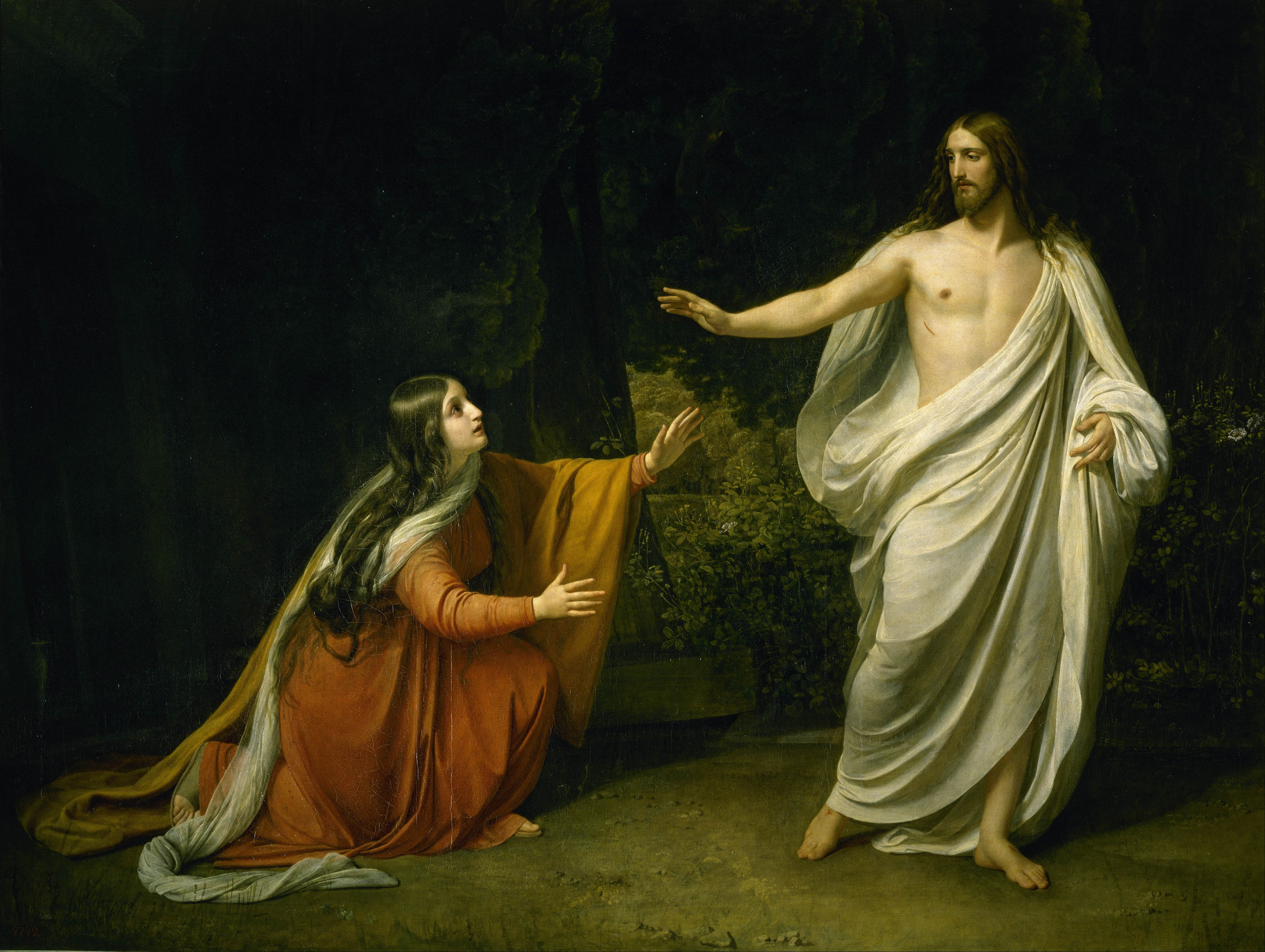
Appearance of Jesus Christ to Maria Magdalena by Alexander Andreyevich Ivanov, 1835

The Gospels do not describe the moment of the resurrection of Jesus. They describe the discovery of his empty tomb and several appearances of Jesus, with distinct differences in each narrative.

In the four Gospels, Mary Magdalene goes to the tomb on Sunday morning, alone or with one or several other women. The tomb is empty, with the stone rolled away, and there are one or two angels, depending on the accounts. In the Synoptics, the women are told that Jesus is not here and that he is risen. In Mark and Matthew, the angel also instructs them to tell the disciples to meet Jesus in Galilee. In Luke, Peter visits the tomb after he is told it is empty. In John, he goes there with the beloved disciple. Matthew mentions Roman guards at the tomb, who report to the priests of Jerusalem what happened. The priests bribe them to say that the disciples stole Jesus's body during the night.

The four Gospels then describe various appearances of Jesus in his resurrected body. Jesus first reveals himself to Mary Magdalene in Mark 16:9 and John 20:14–17, along with "the other Mary" in Matthew 28:9, while in Luke the first reported appearance is to two disciples heading to Emmaus. Jesus then reveals himself to the eleven disciples, in Jerusalem or in Galilee. In Luke 24:36–43, he eats and shows them his tangible wounds to prove that he is not a spirit. He also shows them to Thomas to end his doubts, in John 20:24–29. In the Synoptics, Jesus commissions the disciples to spread the gospel message to all nations, while in John 21, he tells Peter to take care of his sheep.

Jesus's ascension into Heaven is described in Luke 24:50–53, Acts 1:1–11, and mentioned in 1 Timothy 3:16. In the Acts of the Apostles, forty days after the Resurrection, as the disciples look on, "he was lifted up, and a cloud took him out of their sight". 1 Peter 3:22 states that Jesus has "gone into heaven and is at the right hand of God".

The Acts of the Apostles describes several appearances of Jesus after his Ascension. In Acts 7:55, Stephen gazes into heaven and sees "Jesus standing at the right hand of God" just before his death. On the road to Damascus, the Apostle Paul is converted to Christianity after seeing a blinding light and hearing a voice saying, "I am Jesus, whom you are persecuting." In Acts 9:10–18, Jesus instructs Ananias of Damascus in a vision to heal Paul. The Book of Revelation includes a revelation from Jesus concerning the last days of Earth.

== Early Christianity ==
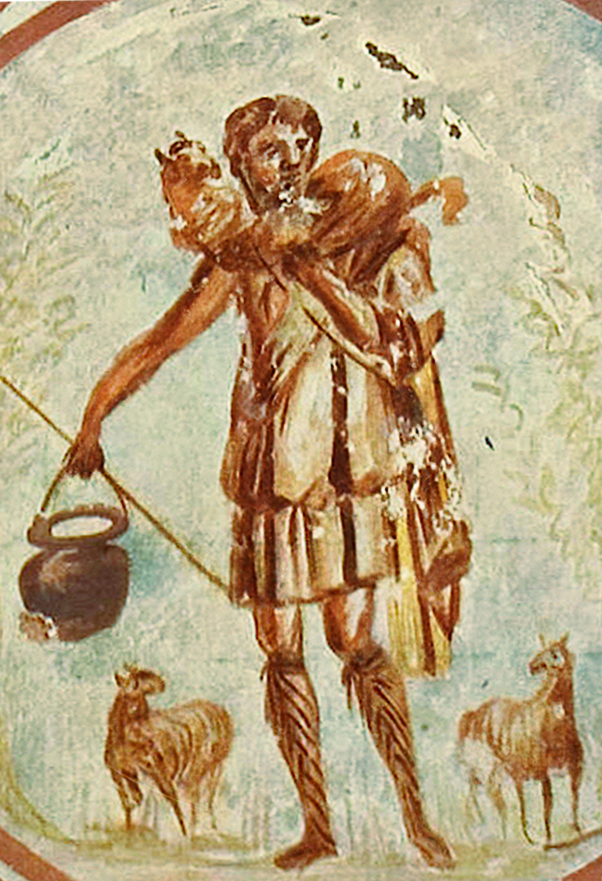
Third-century depiction of Jesus as the Good Shepherd

After Jesus's life, his followers, as described in the first chapters of the Acts of the Apostles, were all Jews either by birth or conversion, for which the biblical term "proselyte" is used, and referred to by historians as Jewish Christians. The early Gospel message was spread orally, probably in Aramaic, but almost immediately also in Greek. The New Testament's Acts of the Apostles and Epistle to the Galatians record that the first Christian community was centred in Jerusalem and its leaders included Peter, James, the brother of Jesus, and John the Apostle.

After his conversion, Paul the Apostle spread the teachings of Jesus to various non-Jewish communities throughout the eastern Mediterranean region. Paul's influence on Christian thinking is said to be more significant than that of any other New Testament author. By the end of the first century, Christianity began to be recognized internally and externally as a separate religion from Judaism which itself was refined and developed further in the centuries after the destruction of the Second Temple.

Numerous quotations in the New Testament and other Christian writings of the first centuries indicate that early Christians generally used and revered the Hebrew Bible (the Tanakh) as religious text, mostly in the Greek (Septuagint) or Aramaic (Targum) translations. Early Christians wrote many religious works, including the ones included in the canon of the New Testament. The canonical texts, which have become the main sources used by historians to try to understand the historical Jesus and sacred texts within Christianity, were probably written between AD 50 and 120.

== Historical views ==
Prior to the Enlightenment, the Gospels were usually regarded as accurate historical accounts, but since then scholars have emerged who question the reliability of the Gospels and draw a distinction between the Jesus described in the Gospels and the Jesus of history. Since the 18th century, three separate scholarly quests for the historical Jesus have taken place, each with distinct characteristics and based on different research criteria, which were often developed during the quest that applied them. While there is widespread scholarly agreement on the existence of Jesus, and a basic consensus on the general outline of his life, (Note: Amy-Jill Levine writes: "There is a consensus of sorts on a basic outline of Jesus' life. Most scholars agree that Jesus was baptized by John, debated with fellow Jews on how best to live according to God's will, engaged in healings and exorcisms, taught in parables, gathered male and female followers in Galilee, went to Jerusalem, and was crucified by Roman soldiers during the governorship of Pontius Pilate.") the portraits of Jesus constructed by various scholars often differ from each other, and from the image portrayed in the gospel accounts.

Approaches to the historical reconstruction of the life of Jesus have varied from the "maximalist" approaches of the 19th century, in which the gospel accounts were accepted as reliable evidence wherever it is possible, to the "minimalist" approaches of the early 20th century, where hardly anything about Jesus was accepted as historical. In the 1950s, as the second quest for the historical Jesus gathered pace, the minimalist approaches faded away, and in the 21st century, minimalists such as Price are a small minority. Although a belief in the inerrancy of the Gospels cannot be supported historically, many scholars since the 1980s have held that, beyond the few facts considered to be historically certain, certain other elements of Jesus's life are "historically probable". Modern scholarly research on the historical Jesus thus focuses on identifying the most probable elements.

=== Judea and Galilee in the 1st century ===
Judea, Galilee and neighbouring areas at the time of Jesus

In AD 6, Judea, Idumea, and Samaria were transformed from a client state of the Roman Empire into an imperial province, also called Judea. A Roman prefect, rather than a client ruler, governed the land. The prefect governed from Caesarea Maritima, leaving Jerusalem to be run by the High Priest of Israel. As an exception, the prefect came to Jerusalem during religious festivals, when religious and patriotic enthusiasm sometimes inspired unrest or uprisings. Galilee with Perea was a Herodian client state under the rule of Herod Antipas since 4 BC. Galilee was evidently prosperous, and poverty was limited enough that it did not threaten the social order. Philip (d. AD 34), half-brother of Herod Antipas, ruled as Tetrarch yet another Herodian client state to the north and east of the sea of Galilee that included Gaulanitis, Batanea, and Iturea; it was mostly non-Jewish. South of this on the east bank of the Jordan was the Decapolis; a collection of Hellenistic city-states that were clients of the Roman Empire. North of Galilee were the cities of Tyre and Sidon which were in the Roman province of Syria. Though non-Jewish lands surrounded the mostly Jewish territories of Judea and Galilee, Roman law and practice allowed Jews to remain separate legally and culturally.

This was the era of Hellenistic Judaism, which combined Jewish religious tradition with elements of Hellenistic culture. Until the fall of the Western Roman Empire and the Muslim conquests of the Eastern Mediterranean, the main centres of Hellenistic Judaism were Alexandria (Egypt) and Antioch (now Southern Turkey), the two main Greek colonies of the Middle East and North Africa area, both founded at the end of the fourth century BC in the wake of the conquests of Alexander the Great. Hellenistic Judaism also existed in Jerusalem during the Second Temple Period, where there was conflict between Hellenizers and traditionalists (sometimes called Judaizers). The Hebrew Bible was translated from Biblical Hebrew and Biblical Aramaic into Jewish Koine Greek; the Targum translations into Aramaic were also generated during this era, both due to the decline of knowledge of Hebrew.

Jews based their faith and religious practice on the Torah, five books said to have been given by God to Moses. The three prominent religious parties were the Pharisees, the Essenes, and the Sadducees. Together these parties represented only a small fraction of the population. Most Jews looked forward to a time when God would deliver them from their pagan rulers, possibly through war against the Romans.

=== Sources ===
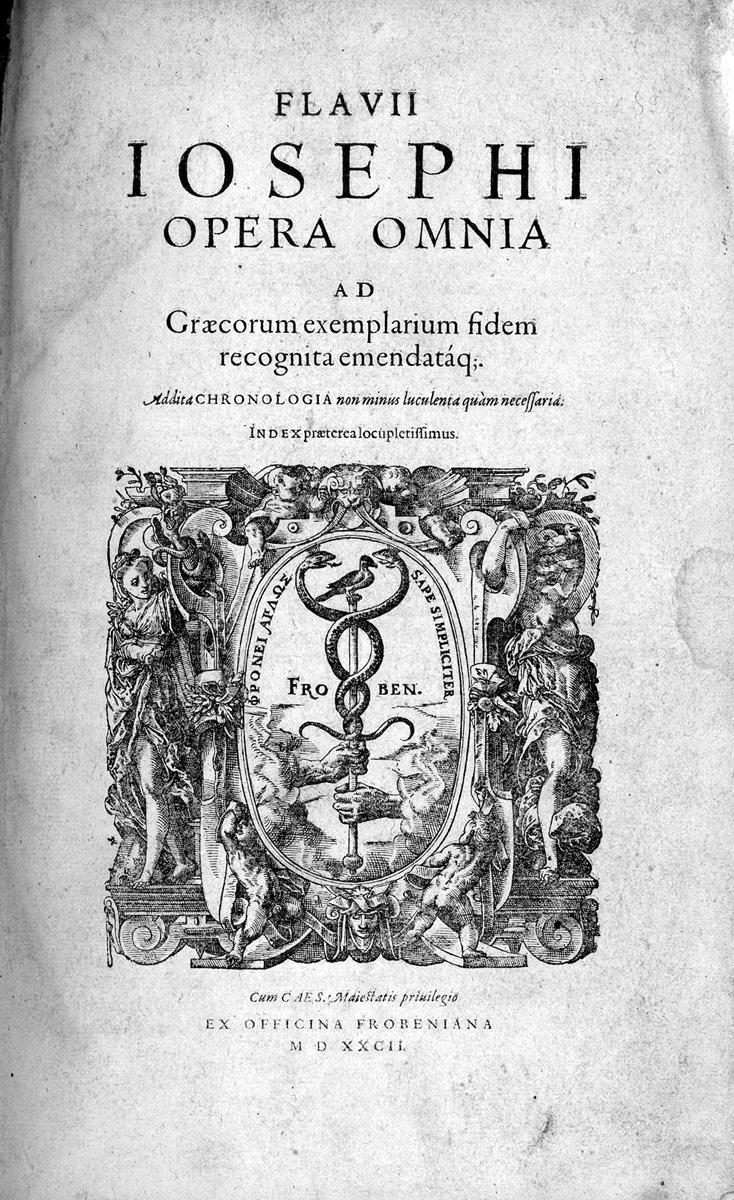
A 1582 edition of the works of Josephus, a first-century Roman-Jewish historian who referred to Jesus

New Testament scholars face a formidable challenge when they analyse the canonical Gospels. The Gospels are not biographies in the modern sense, and the authors explain Jesus's theological significance and recount his public ministry while omitting many details of his life. James Dunn has argued that the accounts of his teachings and life were initially conserved by oral transmission, which was the source of the written Gospels. The Gospels are commonly seen as literature that is based on oral traditions, Christian preaching, and Old Testament exegesis with the consensus being that they are a variation of Greco-Roman biography; similar to other ancient works such as Xenophon's Memoirs of Socrates.

The reports of supernatural events associated with Jesus's death and resurrection make the challenge even more difficult. Scholars regard the Gospels as compromised sources of information because the writers were trying to glorify Jesus. Ed Sanders argues that surviving textual sources provide more reliable details for Jesus's thoughts than they do for the thoughts of Alexander the Great, owing to the texts discussing Jesus being authored closer in time to the events they relate to. Biographies written about Alexander the Great during his own lifetime (who lived 330 years earlier) have all been lost, but are known of through references in biographies written by later authors. Although the texts about Jesus contain ideas from both Jesus and his later followers, it is possible to distinguish which parts originate from Jesus's own view, and which were ideas from his later followers.

Scholars use several criteria, such as the criterion of independent attestation, the criterion of coherence, and the criterion of discontinuity to judge the historicity of events. The historicity of an event also depends on the reliability of the source; indeed, the Gospels are not independent nor consistent records of Jesus's life. The Synoptics, especially Mark, the earliest written gospel, have been considered the most reliable sources of information about Jesus for many decades. John, the latest written gospel, differs considerably from the Synoptic Gospels, and has been considered less reliable, although John's gospel is seen as having more reliability than previously thought or sometimes even more reliable than the synoptics since the third quest.

Some scholars (such as the Jesus Seminar) believe that the non-canonical Gospel of Thomas might be an independent witness to many of Jesus's parables and aphorisms. For example, Thomas confirms that Jesus blessed the poor and that this saying circulated independently before being combined with similar sayings in the Q source. The majority of scholars are sceptical about this text and believe it should be dated to the second century AD. Other select non-canonical Christian texts may also have value for historical Jesus research.

Early non-Christian sources that attest to the historical existence of Jesus include the works of the historians Josephus and Tacitus. (Note: Tuckett writes: "All this does at least render highly implausible any far-fetched theories that even Jesus' very existence was a Christian invention. The fact that Jesus existed, that he was crucified under Pontius Pilate (for whatever reason) and that he had a band of followers who continued to support his cause, seems to be part of the bedrock of historical tradition. If nothing else, the non-Christian evidence can provide us with certainty on that score.") Josephus scholar Louis Feldman has stated that "few have doubted the genuineness" of Josephus's reference to Jesus in book 20 of the Antiquities of the Jews, and it is disputed only by a small number of scholars. Tacitus referred to Christ and his execution by Pilate in book 15 of his work Annals. Scholars generally consider Tacitus's reference to the execution of Jesus to be both authentic and of historical value as an independent Roman source.

Non-Christian sources are valuable as they show that even neutral or hostile parties never show any doubt that Jesus existed. They present a rough picture of Jesus that is compatible with that found in the Christian sources: that Jesus was a teacher, had a reputation as a miracle worker, had a brother James, and died a violent death.

Archaeology helps scholars better understand Jesus's social world. For example, it indicates that Capernaum, a city important in Jesus's ministry, was poor and small, without even a forum or an agora. This archaeological discovery resonates well with the scholarly view that Jesus advocated reciprocal sharing among the destitute in that area of Galilee.

=== Chronology ===
Jesus was a Galilean Jew, born around the beginning of the first century, who died in AD 30 or 33 in Judea. The general scholarly consensus is that Jesus was a contemporary of John the Baptist and was crucified as ordered by the Roman governor Pontius Pilate, who held office from AD 26 to 36.

The Gospels offer several indications concerning the year of Jesus's birth. Matthew 2:1 associates the birth of Jesus with the reign of Herod the Great, who died around 4 BC, and Luke 1:5 mentions that Herod was on the throne shortly before the birth of Jesus, although this gospel also associates the birth with the Census of Quirinius which took place ten years later. Luke 3:23 states that Jesus was "about thirty years old" at the start of his ministry, which according to Acts 10:37–38 was preceded by John the Baptist's ministry, which was recorded in Luke 3:1–2 to have begun in the 15th year of Tiberius's reign (AD 28 or 29). By collating the gospel accounts with historical data and using various other methods, most scholars arrive at a date of birth for Jesus between 6 and 4 BC, but some propose estimates that include a wider range. (Note: For example, John P. Meier states that Jesus's birth year is c. 7/6 BC, while Finegan favours c. 3/2 BC.)

The date range for Jesus's ministry has been estimated using several different approaches. One of these applies the reference in Luke 3:1–2, Acts 10:37–38, and the dates of Tiberius's reign, which are well known, to give a date of around AD 28–29 for the start of Jesus's ministry. Another approach estimates a date around AD 27–29 by using the statement about the temple in John 2:13–20, which asserts that the temple in Jerusalem was in its 46th year of construction at the start of Jesus's ministry, together with Josephus's statement that the temple's reconstruction was started by Herod the Great in the 18th year of his reign. A further method uses the date of the death of John the Baptist and the marriage of Herod Antipas to Herodias, based on the writings of Josephus, and correlates it with Matthew 14:4 and Mark 6:18. Given that most scholars date the marriage of Herod and Herodias as AD 28–35, this yields a date about AD 28–29.

Various approaches have been used to estimate the year of the crucifixion of Jesus. Most scholars agree that he died in AD 30 or 33. The Gospels state that the event occurred during the prefecture of Pilate. The date for the conversion of Paul (estimated to be AD 33–36) acts as an upper bound for the date of Crucifixion. The dates for Paul's conversion and ministry can be determined by analysing the Pauline epistles and the Acts of the Apostles. Astronomers have tried to estimate the precise date of the Crucifixion by analysing lunar motion and calculating historic dates of Passover, a festival based on the lunisolar Hebrew calendar. The most widely accepted dates derived from this method are 7 April AD 30, and 3 April AD 33 (both Julian).

=== Historicity of events ===
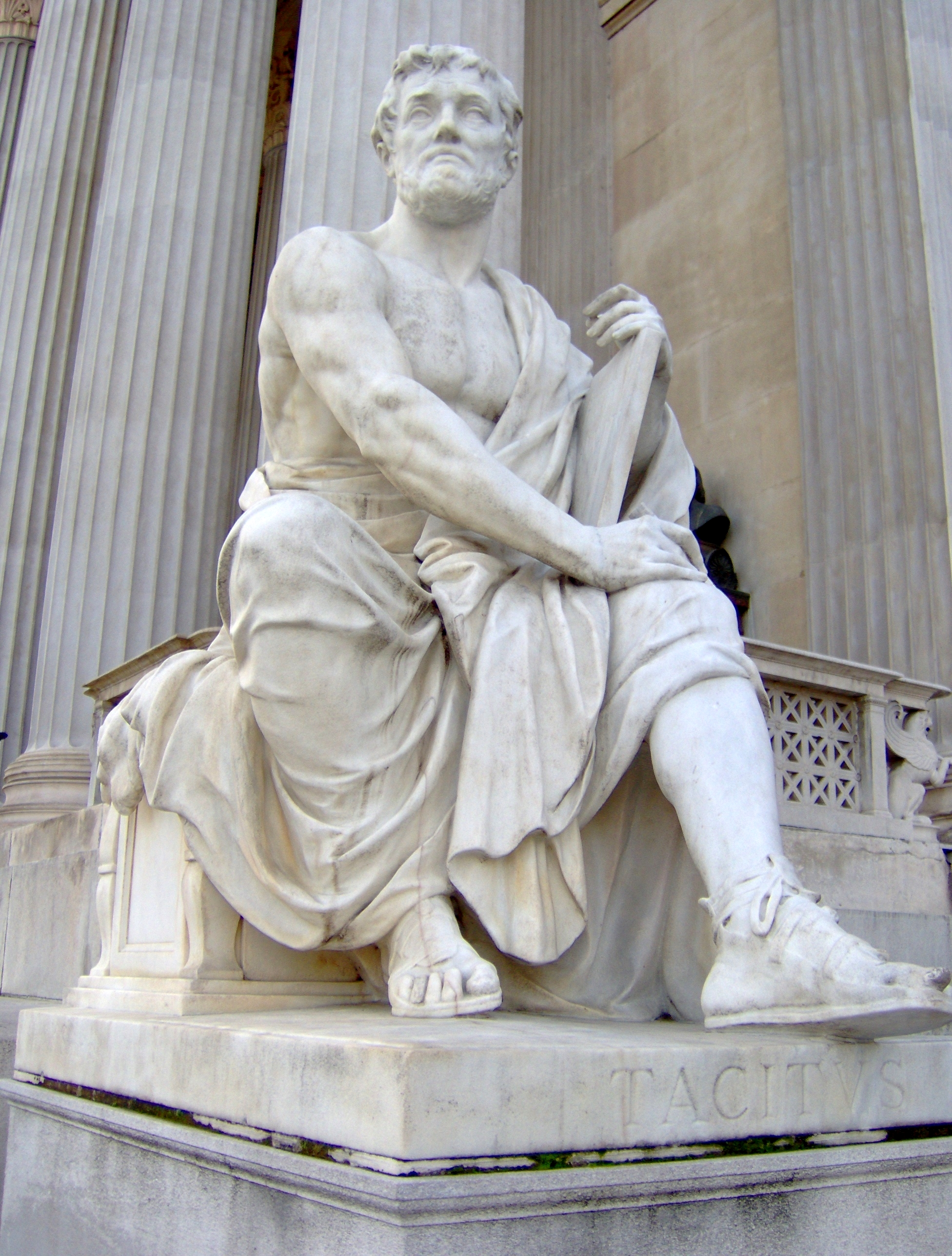
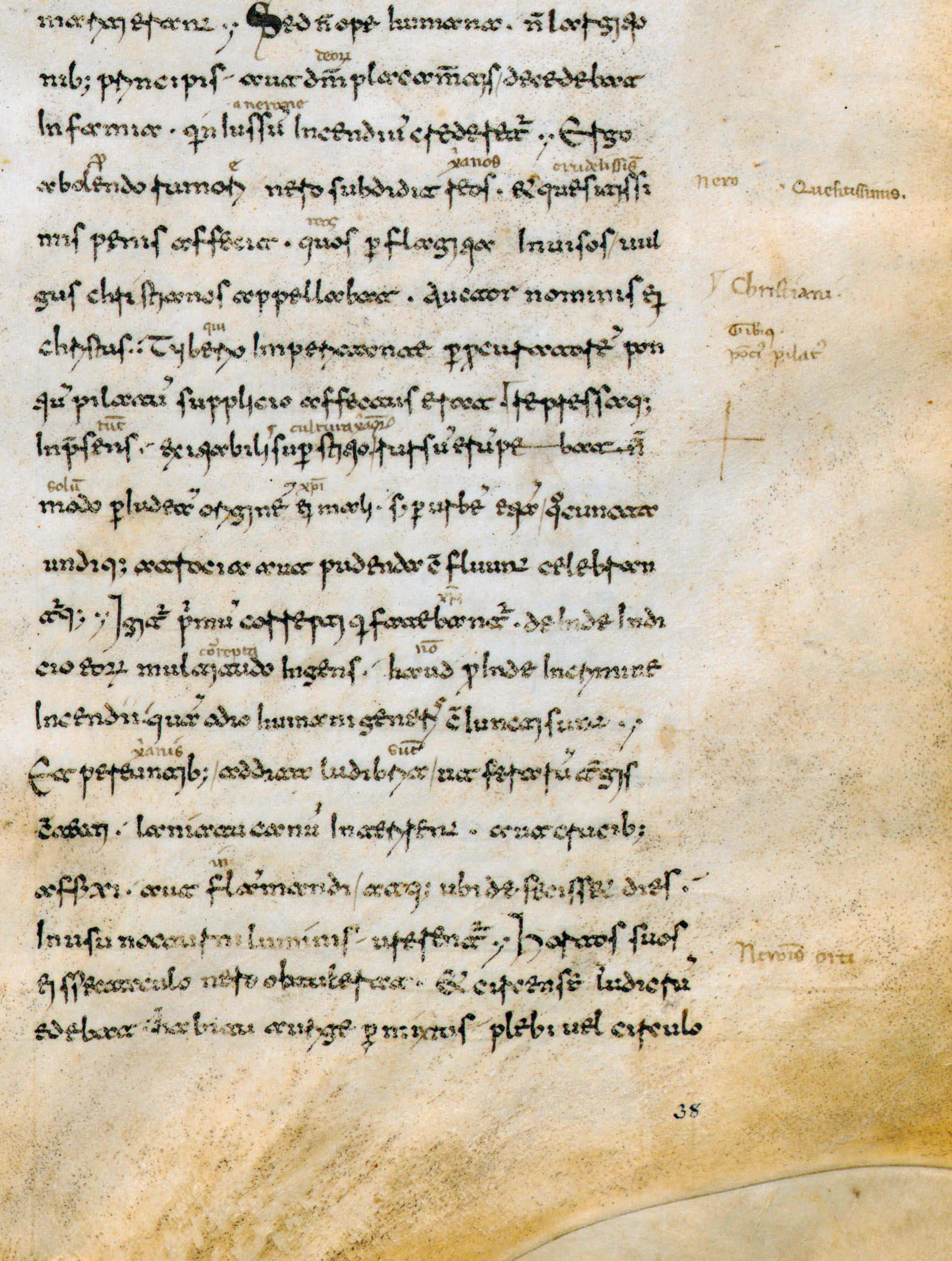
Roman senator and historian Tacitus (statue, pictured left) mentioned the execution of "Christus" ('Jesus') by Pilate in a passage describing the Great Fire of Rome and Nero's persecution of Christians in the Annals, a history of the Roman Empire during the first century.

Nearly all historians (both modern and historical) agree that Jesus was a real person who historically existed. Scholars have reached a limited consensus on the basics of Jesus's life.

==== Family ====
Many scholars including biblical ones agree that Joseph, Jesus's father, died before Jesus began his ministry. Joseph is not mentioned in the Gospels during Jesus's ministry. Joseph's death would explain why in Mark 6:3, Jesus's neighbours refer to Jesus as the "son of Mary" (sons were usually identified by their fathers).

According to Theissen and Merz, it is common for extraordinary charismatic leaders, such as Jesus, to come into conflict with their ordinary families. In Mark, Jesus's family comes to get him, fearing that he is mad (Mark 3:20–34), and this account is thought to be historical because early Christians would probably not have invented it. After Jesus's death, many members of his family joined the Christian movement. Jesus's brother James became a leader of the Jerusalem Church.

Géza Vermes says that the doctrine of the virgin birth of Jesus arose from theological development rather than from historical events. Other scholars take it as significant that the virgin birth is attested by two separate gospels, Matthew and Luke.

E. P. Sanders and Marcus Borg note that the birth narratives in Matthew and Luke are ahistorical and the clearest cases of invention in the Gospel narratives of Jesus's life. Dale Allison and W. D. Davies argue that Matthew presents a unified and preexisting infancy narrative based on haggadic legends about Moses, though they maintain that elements in the story such as the names of Mary and Joseph and Jesus being in Nazareth during Herod's reign are historical. Both accounts have Jesus born in Bethlehem, in accordance with Jewish salvation history, and both have him growing up in Nazareth, but Sanders points out that the two report different explanations for how that happened. Luke's account of a worldwide census is not plausible, while Matthew's account is more plausible, but the story reads as though it was invented to identify Jesus as a new Moses, and the historian Josephus reports Herod the Great's brutality without ever mentioning that he massacred little boys. Scholars including Gerd Theissen and Annette Merz conclude that Jesus was born in Nazareth, and the Bethlehem birth narrative was developed to align Jesus's story with scripture foretelling that the messiah would be born in Bethlehem. The differences found in the gospel accounts are typical of ancient historical biographies. The contradictions were apparent to early Christians, with harmonizations present in the infancy gospels of Thomas and the Gospel of James, which are dated to the second century AD.

Conservative scholars argue that despite the uncertainty of the details, the gospel birth narratives trace back to historical, or at least much earlier pre-gospel traditions. For instance, according to Ben Witherington:

What we find in Matthew and Luke is not the story of ... a [god] descending to earth and, in the guise of a man, mating with a human woman, but rather the story of a miraculous conception without the aid of any man, divine or otherwise. As such, this story is without precedent either in Jewish or pagan literature.

Sanders says that the genealogies of Jesus are based not on historical information but on the author's desire to show that Jesus was the universal Jewish saviour. In any event, once the doctrine of the virgin birth of Jesus became established, that tradition superseded the earlier tradition that he was descended from David through Joseph. The Gospel of Luke reports that Jesus was a blood relative of John the Baptist, but scholars generally consider this connection to be invented.

==== Baptism ====
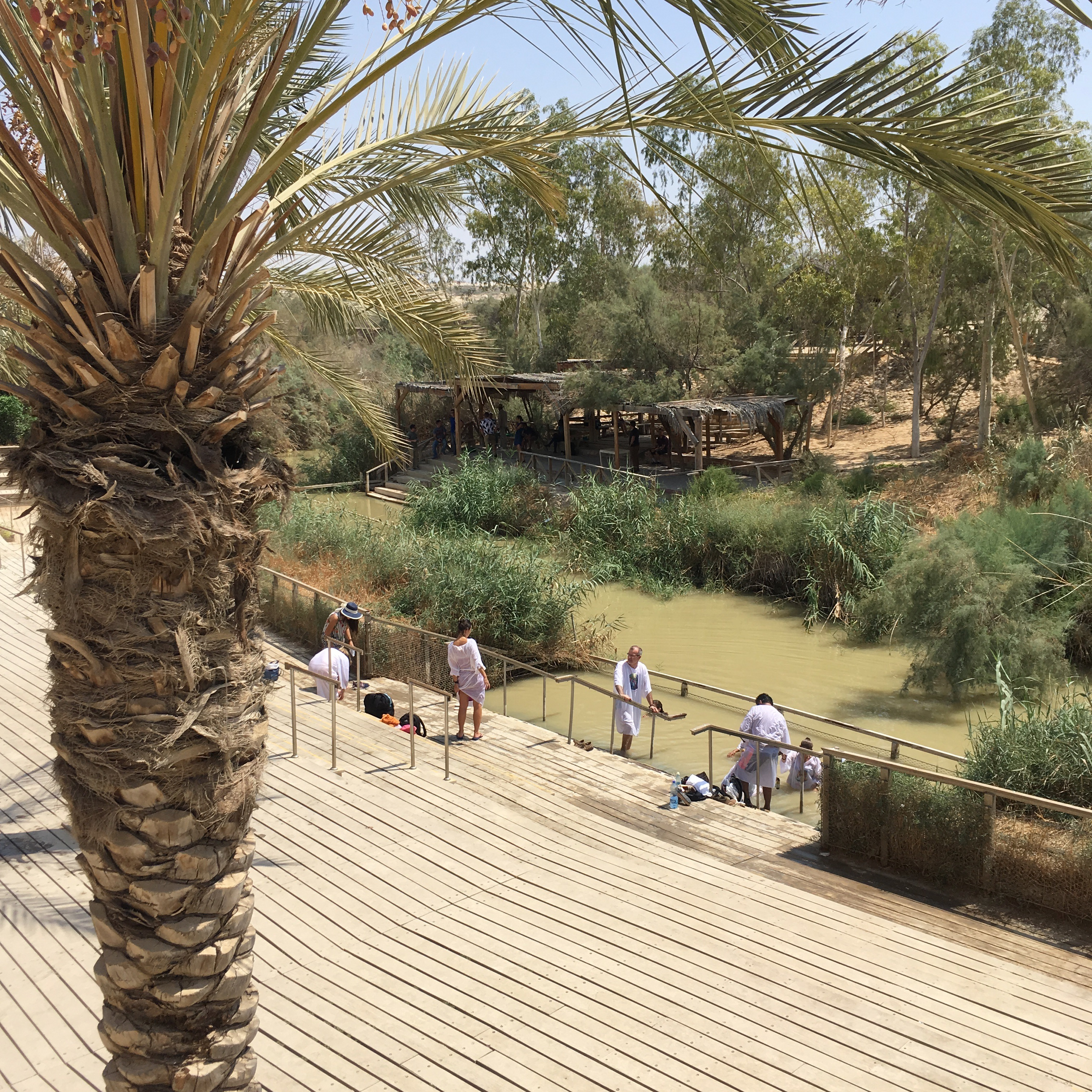
Baptism in the Jordan River, the river where Jesus was baptized

Most modern scholars consider Jesus's baptism to be a historical fact, along with his crucifixion. The theologian James D. G. Dunn states that they "command almost universal assent" and "rank so high on the 'almost impossible to doubt or deny' scale of historical facts" that they are often the starting points for the study of the historical Jesus. Scholars adduce the criterion of embarrassment, saying that early Christians would not have invented a baptism that might imply that Jesus committed sins and wanted to repent. According to Theissen and Merz, Jesus was inspired by John the Baptist and took over from him many elements of his teaching.

==== Ministry in Galilee ====
Most scholars hold that Jesus lived in Galilee and Judea and did not preach or study elsewhere. They agree that Jesus debated with Jewish authorities on the subject of God, performed some healings, taught in parables and gathered followers. Jesus's Jewish critics considered his ministry to be scandalous because he feasted with sinners, fraternized with women, and allowed his followers to pluck grain on the Sabbath. According to Sanders, it is not plausible that disagreements over how to interpret the Law of Moses and the Sabbath would have led Jewish authorities to want Jesus killed.

According to Ehrman, Jesus taught that a coming kingdom was everyone's proper focus, not anything in this life. He taught about the Jewish Law, seeking its true meaning, sometimes in opposition to traditions. Jesus put love at the centre of the Law, and following that Law was an apocalyptic necessity. His ethical teachings called for forgiveness, not judging others, loving enemies, and caring for the poor. Funk and Hoover note that typical of Jesus were paradoxical or surprising turns of phrase, such as advising one, when struck on the cheek, to offer the other cheek to be struck as well.

The Gospels portray Jesus teaching in well-defined sessions, such as the Sermon on the Mount in the Gospel of Matthew or the parallel Sermon on the Plain in Luke. While these teaching sessions include authentic teachings of Jesus, Theissen and Merz contend that the scenes were invented by the evangelists to frame these teachings, originally recorded without context. Le Donne, however, rejects the form-critical notion that smaller units of traditions held a defined stage of circulation before the gospels' composition. While Jesus's miracles fit within the social context of antiquity, he defined them differently. First, he attributed them to the faith of those healed. Second, he connected them to end times prophecy.

Jesus chose twelve disciples (the "Twelve"). According to Bart Ehrman, Jesus's promise that the Twelve would rule is historical, because the Twelve included Judas Iscariot. In Ehrman's view, no Christians would have invented a line from Jesus, promising rulership to the disciple who betrayed him.

In Mark, the disciples play hardly any role other than a negative one. While others sometimes respond to Jesus with complete faith, his disciples are puzzled and doubtful. They serve as a foil to Jesus and to other characters. The failings of the disciples are probably exaggerated in Mark, and the disciples make a better showing in Matthew and Luke. Recent studies tend to suggest that Mark is not as negative towards Peter as a previous generation of scholars thought.

Sanders says that Jesus's mission was not about repentance, although he acknowledges that this opinion is unpopular. He argues that repentance appears as a strong theme only in Luke, that repentance was John the Baptist's message, and that Jesus's ministry would not have been scandalous if the sinners he ate with had been repentant. According to Theissen and Merz, Jesus taught that God was generously giving people an opportunity to repent.

==== Role ====
Jesus referred to himself as a "son of man" in the colloquial sense of "a person", but scholars do not know whether he also meant himself when he referred to the heavenly "Son of Man". Paul the Apostle and other early Christians interpreted the "Son of Man" as the risen Jesus. Dale Allison argues Jesus identified himself as the son of man in Daniel, rejecting the notion of another eschatological figure.

The Gospels refer to Jesus not only as a messiah but in the absolute form as "the Messiah" or, equivalently, "the Christ". In early Judaism, this absolute form of the title is not found, but only phrases such as "his messiah". The tradition is ambiguous enough to leave room for debate as to whether Jesus defined his eschatological role as that of the Messiah. The Jewish messianic tradition included many different forms, some of them focused on a messiah figure and others not. Based on the Christian tradition, Gerd Theissen advances the hypothesis that Jesus saw himself in messianic terms but did not claim the title "Messiah". Bart Ehrman argues that Jesus did consider himself to be the Messiah, albeit in the sense that he would be the king of the new political order that God would usher in, not in the sense that most people today think of the term.

==== Passover and crucifixion in Jerusalem ====
Around AD 30, Jesus and his followers travelled from Galilee to Jerusalem to observe Pesach (Passover). Jesus caused a disturbance in the Second Temple, which was the centre of Jewish religious and civil authority. Sanders associates it with Jesus's prophecy that the Temple would be totally demolished. Jesus held a last meal with his disciples, which is the origin of the Sacrament of the Holy Eucharist. According to John P. Meier, Jesus having a final meal with his disciples is generally accepted among scholars, and belongs to the framework of the narrative of Jesus' life, with a majority viewing Mark 14 as substantially historical. The meal appears to have pointed to Jesus's place in the Kingdom of God when Jesus probably knew he was to be killed, although he may have still hoped that God might intervene.

The Gospels say that Jesus was betrayed to the authorities by a disciple, and many scholars consider this report to be highly reliable. He was executed on the orders of Pontius Pilate, the Roman prefect of Judaea. Pilate most likely saw Jesus's reference to the Kingdom of God as a threat to Roman authority and worked with the Temple elites to have Jesus executed. The Sadducean high-priestly leaders of the Temple more plausibly had Jesus executed for political reasons than for his teaching. They may have regarded him as a threat to stability, especially after he caused a disturbance at the Second Temple. Other factors, such as Jesus's triumphal entry into Jerusalem, may have contributed to this decision. Most scholars consider Jesus's crucifixion to be factual because early Christians would not have invented the painful death of their leader.

==== After crucifixion ====
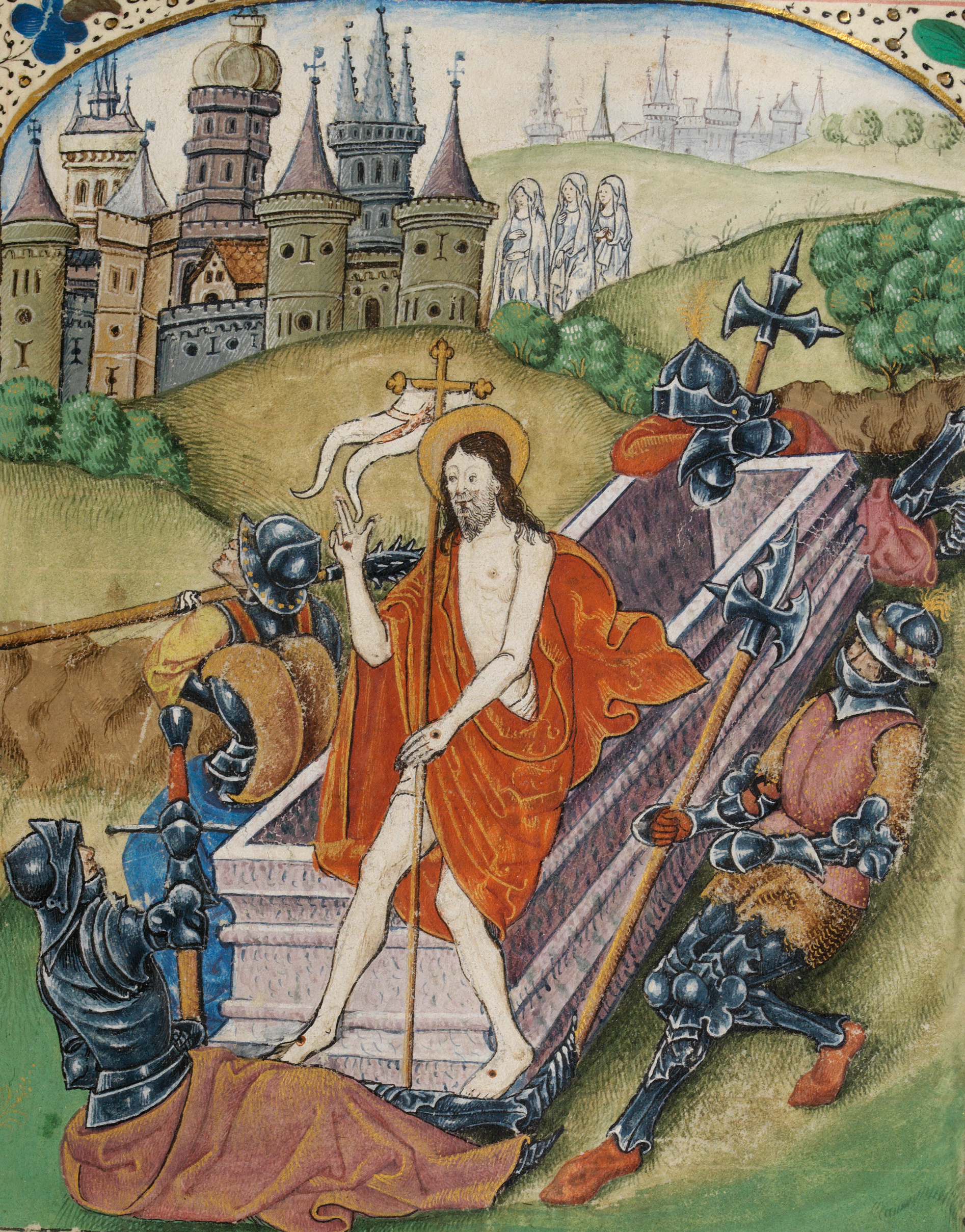
The Resurrection of Christ from a 16th-century manuscript of La Passion de Nostre Seigneur

After Jesus's death, his followers said he was restored to life, although the exact details of their experiences are unclear. The gospel reports contradict each other; Sanders suggests competition among those claiming to have seen him first rather than deliberate fraud, while White emphasizes differences in the agendas of the evangelists. Differences between accounts were a feature of ancient biographies, such as the accounts of Otho in Suetonius and Plutarch. Another common hypothesis among historians is that all reported perceptions of Jesus are confabulated or a case of mistaken identity. The followers of Jesus formed a community to wait for his return and the founding of his kingdom.

=== Scholarly portrayals of Jesus ===
Modern research on the historical Jesus has not led to a unified picture of the historical figure, partly because of the variety of academic traditions represented by the scholars. Given the scarcity of historical sources, it is generally difficult for any scholar to construct a portrait of Jesus that can be considered historically valid beyond the basic elements of his life. The portraits of Jesus constructed in these quests often differ from each other, and from the image portrayed in the Gospels.

Jesus is seen as the founder of, in the words of Sanders, a "renewal movement within Judaism". One of the criteria used to discern historical details in the "third quest" is the criterion of plausibility, relative to Jesus's Jewish context and to his influence on Christianity. A disagreement in contemporary research is whether Jesus was apocalyptic. Most scholars conclude that he was an apocalyptic preacher, like John the Baptist and Paul the Apostle. Certain prominent North American scholars, such as Burton Mack and John Dominic Crossan, advocate for a non-eschatological Jesus, one who is more of a Cynic sage than an apocalyptic preacher. In addition to portraying Jesus as an apocalyptic prophet, a charismatic healer or a cynic philosopher, some scholars portray him as the true messiah or an egalitarian prophet of social change. The attributes described in the portraits sometimes overlap, and scholars who differ on some attributes sometimes agree on others.

Since the 18th century, scholars have occasionally put forth that Jesus was a political national messiah, but the evidence for this portrait is negligible. Likewise, the proposal that Jesus was a Zealot does not fit with the earliest strata of the Synoptic tradition.

=== Language, ethnicity, and appearance ===
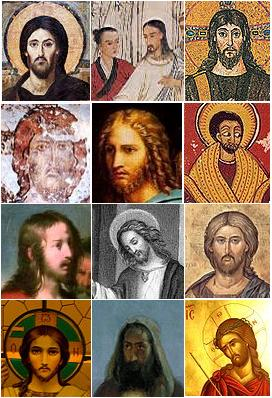
The ethnicity of Jesus in art has been influenced by cultural settings.

Jesus grew up in Galilee and much of his ministry took place there. The languages spoken in Galilee and Judea during the first century AD included Jewish Palestinian Aramaic, Hebrew, and Greek, with Aramaic being predominant. There is substantial consensus that Jesus gave most of his teachings in Aramaic in the Galilean dialect. Other than Aramaic and Hebrew, it is likely that he was also able to speak Greek.

Modern scholars agree that Jesus was a Jew of first-century Judea. Ioudaios in New Testament Greek (Note: In the New Testament, Jesus is described as Jewish / Judean (Ioudaios as written in Koine Greek) on three occasions: by the Magi in Matthew 2:2, who referred to Jesus as "King of the Jews" (basileus ton ioudaion); by both the Samaritan woman at the well in John 4:9 and John 4:20 and by Jesus himself in John 4:22; and (in all four gospels) during the Passion, by the Romans, who also used the phrase "King of the Jews". Jesus was also described as "King of Israel" in John 1:49, John 12:13, Mark 15:32 and Matthew 27:42.) is a term which in the contemporary context may refer to religion (Second Temple Judaism), ethnicity (of Judea), or both. In a review of the state of modern scholarship, Amy-Jill Levine writes that the entire question of ethnicity is "fraught with difficulty", and that "beyond recognizing that 'Jesus was Jewish', rarely does the scholarship address what being 'Jewish' means".

The New Testament gives no description of the physical appearance of Jesus before his death—it is generally indifferent to racial appearances and does not refer to the features of the people it mentions. Jesus probably looked like a typical Jewish man of his time and place; standing around 166 cm (5 ft 5 in) tall with a thin but fit build, olive-brown skin, brown eyes and short, dark hair. He also probably had a beard that was not particularly long or heavy.

=== Christ myth theory ===
The Christ myth theory is the hypothesis that Jesus of Nazareth never existed; or that if he did, he had virtually nothing to do with the founding of Christianity and the accounts in the gospels. (Note: Ehrman writes: "In simpler terms, the historical Jesus did not exist. Or if he did, he had virtually nothing to do with the founding of Christianity." Further quoting as authoritative the fuller definition provided by Earl Doherty in Jesus: Neither God Nor Man. Age of Reason, 2009, pp. vii–viii: it is "the theory that no historical Jesus worthy of the name existed, that Christianity began with a belief in a spiritual, mythical figure, that the Gospels are essentially allegory and fiction, and that no single identifiable person lay at the root of the Galilean preaching tradition".) Stories of Jesus's birth, along with other key events, have so many mythic elements that some scholars have suggested that Jesus himself was a myth.

Bruno Bauer (1809–1882) taught that the first Gospel was a work of literature that produced history rather than described it. According to Albert Kalthoff (1850–1906), a social movement produced Jesus when it encountered Jewish messianic expectations. Arthur Drews (1865–1935) saw Jesus as the concrete form of a myth that predated Christianity. Despite arguments put forward by authors who have questioned the existence of a historical Jesus, virtually all scholars of antiquity accept that Jesus was a historical figure and consider the myth theory to be fringe.

== Religious perspectives ==
Jesus's teachings and the retelling of his life story have significantly influenced the course of human history, and have directly or indirectly affected the lives of billions of people, even non-Christians, worldwide. He is considered by many people to be the most influential figure to have ever lived, finding a significant place in numerous cultural contexts.

Apart from his own disciples and followers, the Jews of Jesus's day generally rejected him as the messiah, as does Judaism today. Christian theologians, ecumenical councils, reformers and others have written extensively about Jesus over the centuries. Christian denominations have often been defined or characterized by their descriptions of Jesus. Meanwhile, Manichaeans, Gnostics, Muslims, Druzes, the Baháʼís, and others have found prominent places for Jesus in their religions.

=== Christianity ===
The Trinity is the belief in Christianity that God is one God in three persons: God the Father, God the Son (Jesus), and God the Holy Spirit.

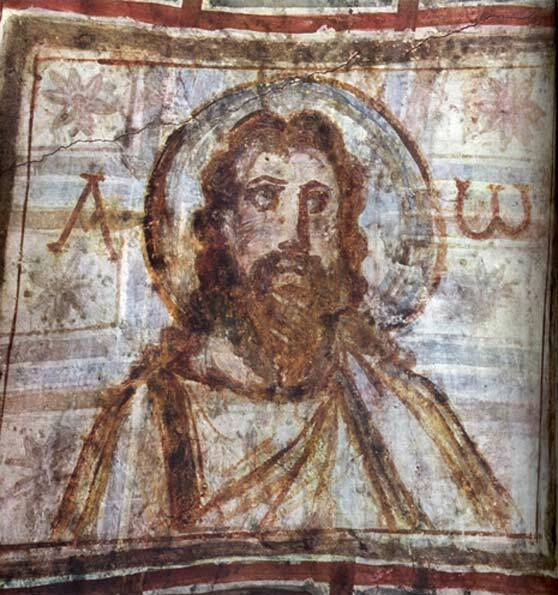
Jesus is depicted with the Alpha and Omega letters in the Catacombs of Rome from the fourth century.

Jesus is the central figure of Christianity. Although Christian views of Jesus vary, it is possible to summarize the key beliefs shared by the major denominations, as stated in their catechetical or confessional texts. Christian views of Jesus are derived from the texts of the New Testament, including the canonical gospels and letters such as the Pauline epistles and the Johannine writings. These documents outline the key Christian beliefs about Jesus, including his divinity, humanity, and earthly life, and that he is the Christ and the Son of God. Despite their many shared beliefs, not all Christian denominations agree on all doctrines, and both major and minor differences on teachings and beliefs have persisted throughout Christianity for centuries.

The New Testament states that the resurrection of Jesus is the foundation of the Christian faith. Christian doctrine holds that through his sacrificial death and resurrection, humans can be reconciled with God and are thereby offered salvation and the promise of eternal life. Recalling the words of John the Baptist in the gospel of John, these doctrines sometimes refer to Jesus as the Lamb of God, who was crucified to fulfil his role as the servant of God. Jesus is thus seen as the new and last Adam, whose obedience contrasts with Adam's disobedience. Christians view Jesus as a role model, whose God-focused life believers are encouraged to imitate.

Most branches of Christianity believe that Jesus is both human and the Son of God. While there has been theological debate over his nature, (Note: Following the Apostolic Age, there was fierce and often politicized debate in the early church on many interrelated issues. Christology was a major focus of these debates, and was addressed at every one of the first seven ecumenical councils. Some early beliefs viewed Jesus as ontologically subordinate to the Father (Subordinationism), and others considered him an aspect of the Father rather than a separate person (Sabellianism), both were condemned as heresies by the Catholic Church. The Church resolved the issues in ancient councils, which established the Holy Trinity, with Jesus both fully human and fully God.) Trinitarian Christians generally believe that Jesus is the Logos, God's incarnation and God the Son, both fully divine and fully human. The doctrine of the Trinity is not universally accepted among Christians. With the Reformation, Christians such as Michael Servetus and the Socinians started questioning the ancient creeds that had established Jesus's two natures. Nontrinitarian Christian groups include the Church of Jesus Christ of Latter-day Saints, Unitarians and Jehovah's Witnesses.

Christians revere not only Jesus but also his name. Devotions to the Holy Name of Jesus go back to the earliest days of Christianity. These devotions and feasts exist in both Eastern and Western Christianity.

=== Christian Gnosticism ===
In Christian Gnosticism (now a largely extinct religious movement), Jesus was sent from the divine realm and provided the secret knowledge (gnosis) necessary for salvation. Gnosticism is not a homogeneous religion, but an umbrella term used by modern scholars to describe diverse religious and philosophical ideas and systems that emerged in the late first century among early Christian sects and other religious movements.

Most Gnostics believed that Jesus was a human who became possessed by the spirit of "the Christ" at his baptism. This spirit left Jesus's body during the crucifixion but was rejoined to him when he was raised from the dead. Some Gnostics were docetics, believing that Jesus did not have a physical body, but only appeared to possess one. The Gnostic Jesus can both differ greatly from the Christian Jesus, but also build on him. For instance, the Testimony of Truth, a Gnostic Christian text found in the Nag Hammadi library buried around 400 AD, explains that the serpent in Genesis 3 who instructs Adam and Eve is Jesus.

=== Judaism ===
Judaism rejects the idea of Jesus (or any future Jewish messiah) being God, or a mediator to God, or part of a Trinity. It holds that Jesus is not the messiah, arguing that he neither fulfilled the messianic prophecies in the Tanakh nor embodied the personal qualifications of the Messiah. Jews argue that Jesus did not fulfil prophecies to build the Third Temple, gather Jews back to Israel, bring world peace, and unite humanity under the God of Israel. Furthermore, according to Jewish tradition, there were no prophets after Malachi, who delivered his prophecies in the fifth century BC.

Judaic criticism of Jesus is long-standing and includes a range of stories found in the Talmud, written and compiled between the 3rd and 5th centuries. In one such story, Yeshu HaNozri ('Jesus the Nazarene'), a lewd apostate, is executed by the Jewish high court for spreading idolatry and practising magic. According to some, the form Yeshu is an acronym which in Hebrew reads "may his name and memory be blotted out". The majority of contemporary scholars consider that this material provides no information on the historical Jesus. The Mishneh Torah, a late 12th-century work of Jewish law written by Moses Maimonides, states that Jesus is a "stumbling block" who makes "the majority of the world to err and serve a god other than the Lord".

Mediaeval Hebrew literature contains the anecdotal "Episode of Jesus" (known also as Toledot Yeshu), in which Jesus is described as being the son of Joseph, the son of Pandera (see: Episode of Jesus). The account portrays Jesus as an imposter.

=== Manichaeism ===
Manichaeism, an ancient religious movement, became one of the earliest organized religions outside of Christianity to honour Jesus as a significant figure. Within the Manichaean belief system, Jesus is revered alongside other prominent prophets such as Zoroaster, Gautama Buddha, and Mani himself.

=== Islam ===
A major figure in Islam, Jesus (often referred to by his Quranic name ʿĪsā) (Note: In Qira'at (Quranic recitations), the name is pronounced with varying degrees of vowel inclination: [/ʕiːsæː/]: Recited by Warsh (via the al-Azraq path).; [/ʕiːseː/]: Recited by Hamzah and al-Kisa'i.; [/ʕiːsaː/]: Recited by the remaining canonical readers.) is considered to be a messenger of God and the messiah (al-Masīḥ) who was sent to guide the Children of Israel (Banī Isrāʾīl) with a new scripture, the Gospel (referred to in Islam as Injīl). The form ʿĪsē is a pre-Islamic phonosemantic correspondence with the Safaitic name ʿsy, attested in Arabian inscriptions. Muslims regard the gospels' accounts in the New Testament as partially authentic, and believe that Jesus's original message was altered (taḥrīf) and that Muhammad came later to revive it. Belief in Jesus (and all other messengers of God) is a requirement for being a Muslim. The Quran mentions Jesus by name 25 times—more often than Muhammad—and emphasizes that Jesus was a mortal human who, like all other prophets, had been divinely chosen to spread God's message. While the Quran affirms the Virgin birth of Jesus, he is considered to be neither an incarnation nor the son of God. Islamic texts emphasize a strict notion of monotheism (tawḥīd) and forbid the association of partners with God, which would be idolatry.

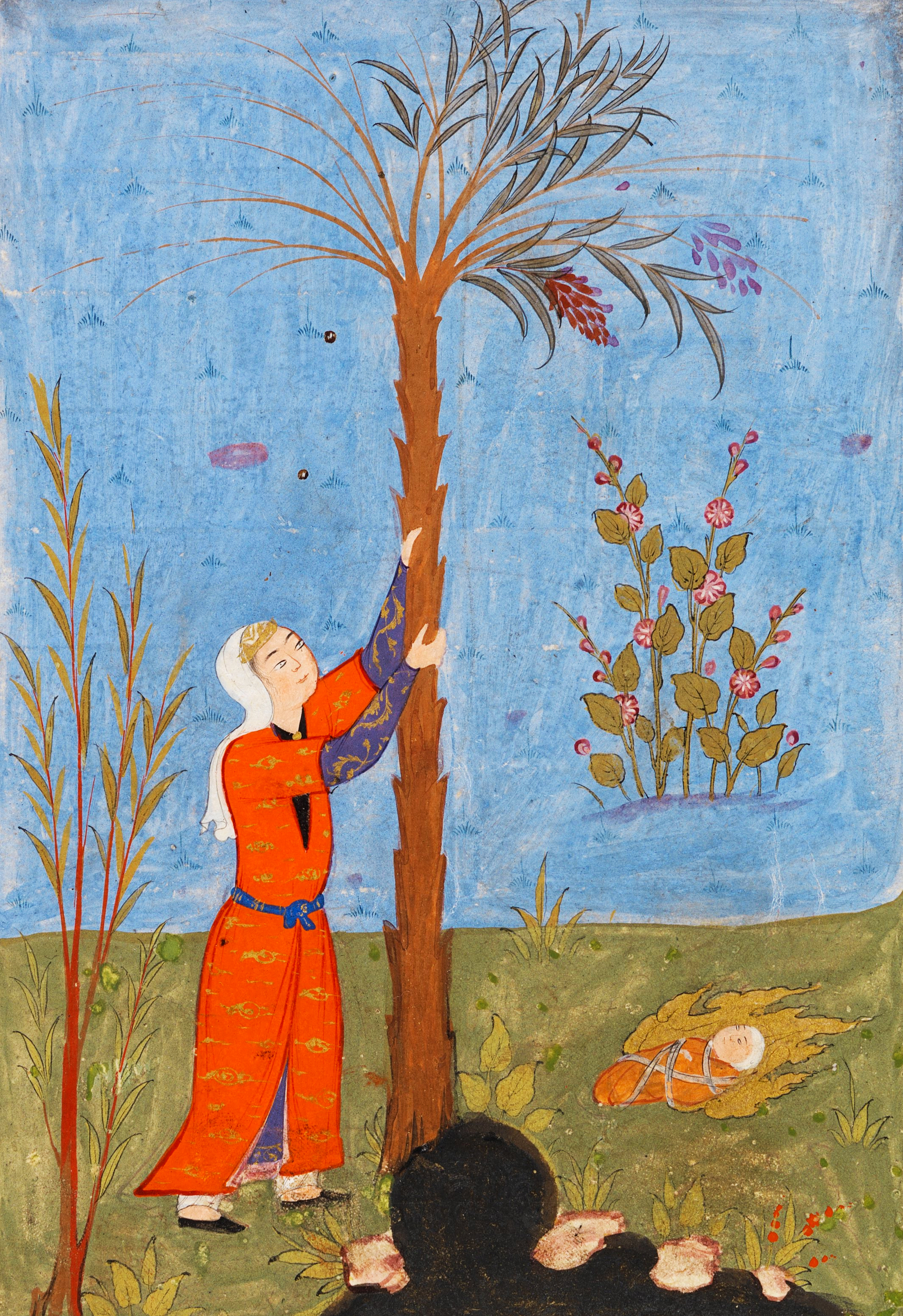
Islamic miniature of Maryam in labour shaking a date palm, with baby Isa and hidden voice below

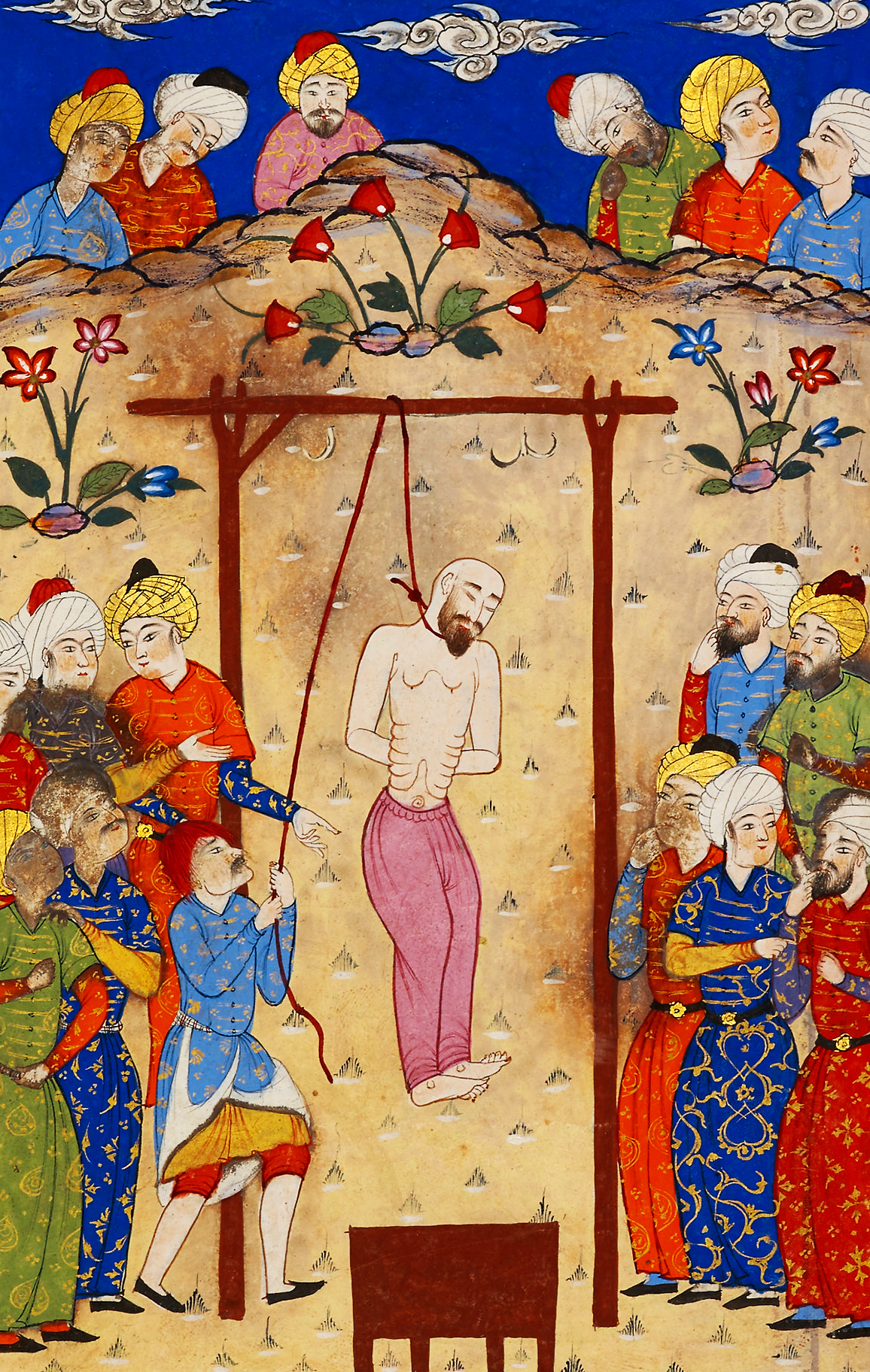
Persian miniature depicting a man who outwardly appeared to the Jews as Jesus being hanged

The Quran describes the annunciation to Mary (Maryam) by the Holy Spirit that she is to give birth to Jesus while remaining a virgin. It calls the virgin birth a miracle that occurred by the will of God. The Quran (21:91 and 66:12) states that God breathed his spirit into Mary while she was chaste. Jesus is called a "spirit from God" because he was born through the action of the Spirit, but that belief does not imply his pre-existence.

To aid in his ministry to the Jewish people, Jesus was given the ability to perform miracles, by permission of God rather than by his own power. Through his ministry, Jesus is seen as a precursor to Muhammad. In the Quran (4:155–160) it is said that the Jews claim to have killed Jesus in a similar manner to previous prophets sent to them, but that this was only made to appear that way, and that they neither killed nor crucified him and that he was raised into the heavens by God and that he will testify against the Jews during the Day of Resurrection.

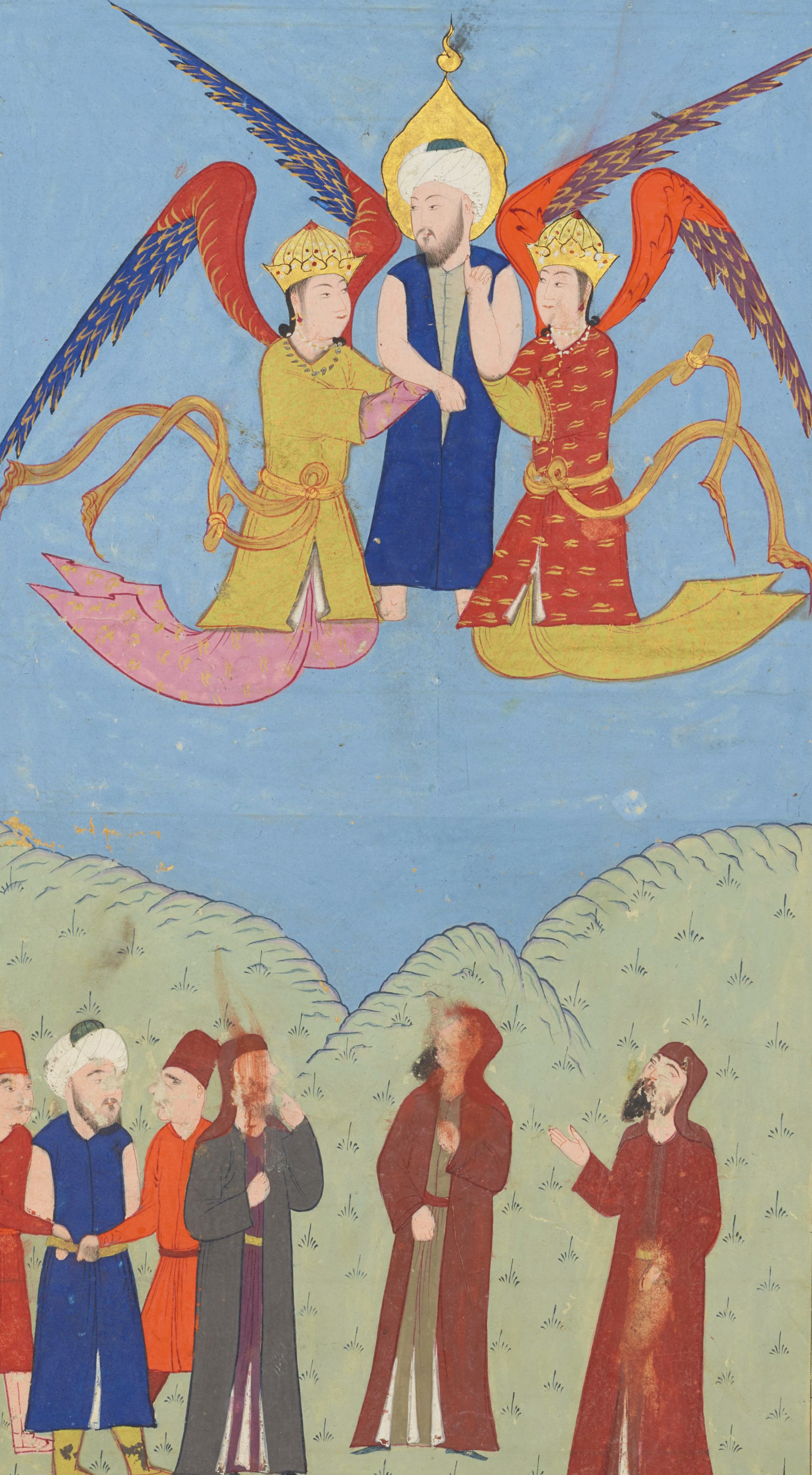
16th-century Ottoman manuscript illustration depicting Isa ascending to heaven, carried by two angels; below him, the Jews who sought to kill him stand astonished in disbelief.

According to most classic Sunni and Twelver Shi'ite interpretations of these verses, the likeness of Jesus was cast upon a substitute (most often one of his disciples), who was crucified in Jesus's stead. Some mediaeval Muslims, including the ghulāt writing under the name of al-Mufaddal ibn Umar al-Ju'fi, the Brethren of Purity, various Isma'ili philosophers, and the Sunni mystic al-Ghazali, affirmed the historicity of Jesus's crucifixion. These thinkers held the docetic view that, although Jesus's human body had died on the cross, his spirit had survived and ascended into heaven, so that his death was only an appearance. Nevertheless, to Muslims it is the ascension rather than the crucifixion that constitutes a major event in the life of Jesus. There is no mention of his resurrection on the third day, and his death plays no special role in Islamic theories of salvation. Jesus is a central figure in Islamic eschatology: Muslims believe that he will return to Earth at the end of time and defeat the Antichrist (ad-Dajjal) by killing him.

According to the Quran, the coming of Muhammad (also called "Ahmad") was predicted by Jesus:

And ˹remember˺ when Jesus, son of Mary, said, "O children of Israel! I am truly Allah's messenger to you, confirming the Torah which came before me, and giving good news of a messenger after me whose name will be Aḥmad." Yet when the Prophet came to them with clear proofs, they said, "This is pure magic."

— Surah As-Saf 61:6

Through this verse, early Arab Muslims claimed legitimacy for their new faith in the existing religious traditions and the predictions of Jesus.

==== Ahmadiyya ====
The Ahmadiyya Muslim Community has several teachings about Jesus. Ahmadis believe that he was a mortal man who survived his crucifixion and died a natural death at the age of 120 in Kashmir, India, and is buried at Roza Bal.

=== Druze ===
In the Druze faith, Jesus is considered and revered as one of the seven spokesmen or prophets (natiq), defined as messengers or intermediaries between God and mankind, along with figures including Moses, Muhammad and Muhammad ibn Isma'il, each of them sent at a different period of history to preach the message of God. In Druze tradition, Jesus is known under three titles: the True Messiah (al-Masih al-Haq), the Messiah of all Nations (Masih al-Umam), and the Messiah of Sinners. This is due, respectively, to the belief that Jesus delivered the true Gospel message, the belief that he was the Saviour of all nations, and the belief that he offers forgiveness.

=== Baháʼí Faith ===
In the Baháʼí Faith, Jesus is considered one of the Manifestations of God, defined as divine messengers or prophets sent by God to guide humanity, along with other religious figures such as Moses, Krishna, Zoroaster, the Buddha, Muhammad, and Baháʼu'lláh. Baháʼís believe that these religious founders or leaders have contributed to the progressive revelation by bringing spiritual and moral values to humanity in their own time and place. As a Manifestation of God, Jesus is believed to reflect God's qualities and attributes, but is not considered the only saviour of humanity nor the incarnation of God. Baháʼís believe in the virgin birth, but see the resurrection and the miracles of Jesus as symbolic.

=== Other ===
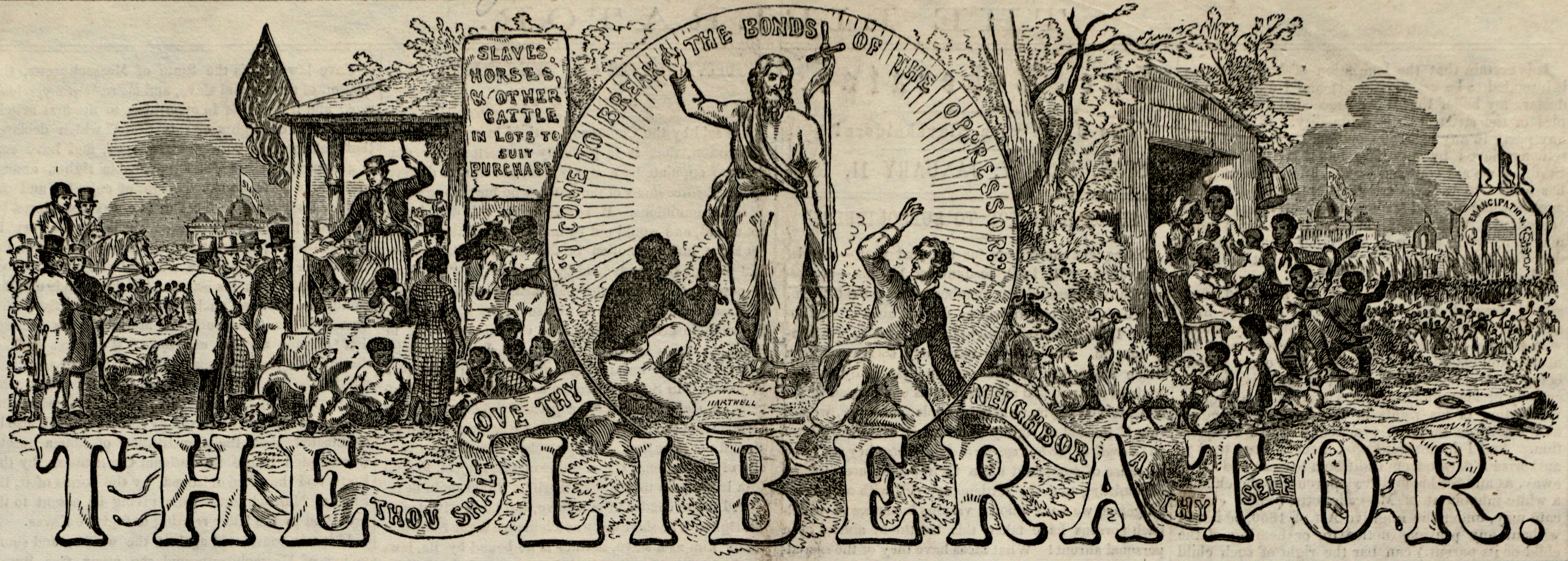
Jesus depicted as the liberator of Black slaves, on the masthead of the abolitionist paper The Liberator

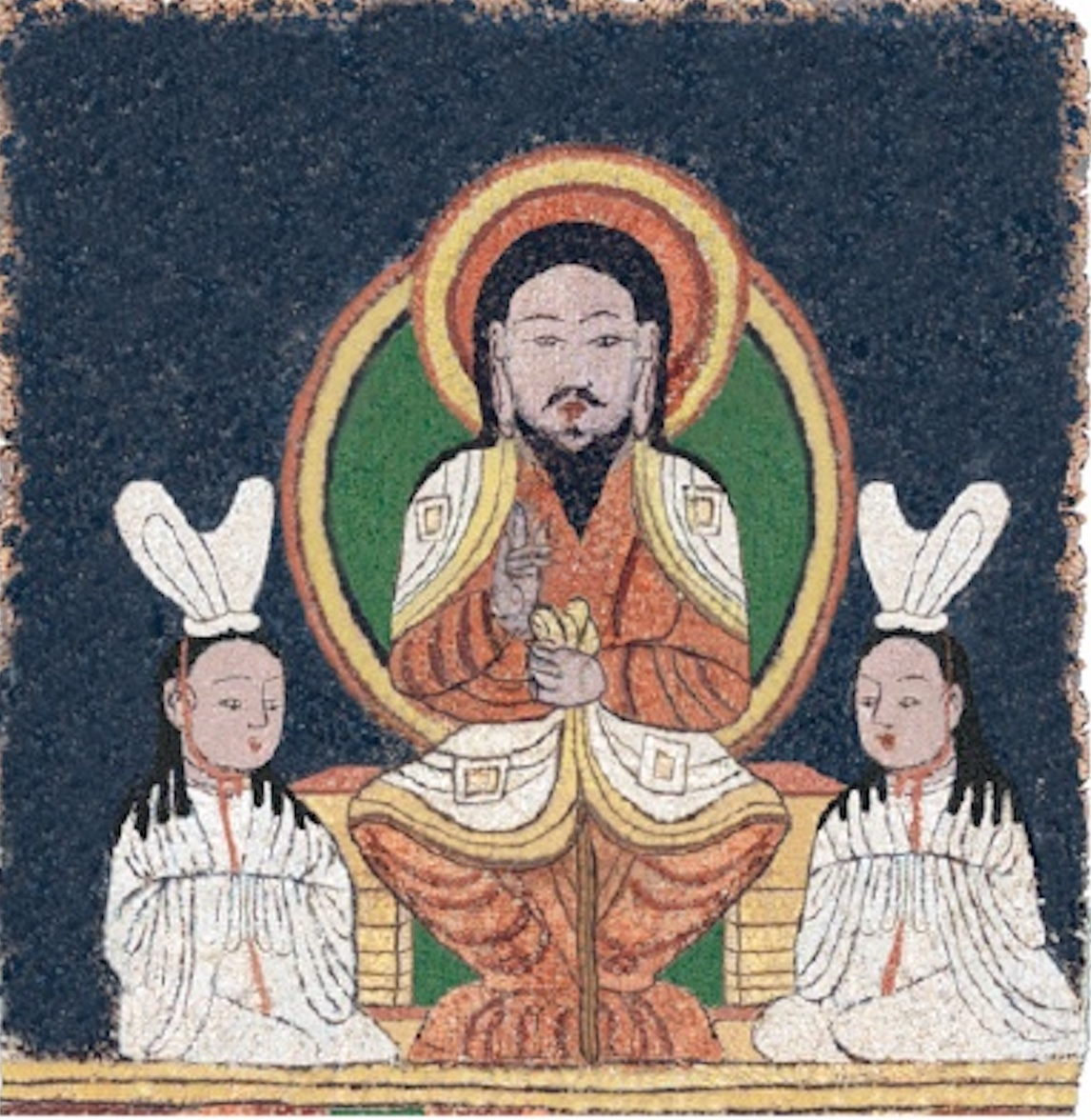
Enthroned Jesus image on a Manichaean temple banner from c. 10th-century Qocho

Hinduism has no established set of beliefs and no universal or common view of Jesus. However, a lot of Hindus, including religious and political leaders, tend to variously consider Jesus as either a Āchārya, Sadhu or Avatar. Some Hare Krishnas also claim that Jesus Christ is an exemplary Hare Krishna devotee, and was predicted and prophesied in the Bhavishya Purana.

Paramahansa Yogananda, an Indian guru, taught that Jesus was the reincarnation of Elisha and a student of John the Baptist, the reincarnation of Elijah. Some Buddhists, including Tenzin Gyatso, the 14th Dalai Lama, regard Jesus as a bodhisattva who dedicated his life to the welfare of people. The New Age movement entertains a wide variety of views on Jesus.

Theosophists, from whom many New Age teachings originated, refer to Jesus as the Master Jesus, a spiritual reformer, and they believe that Christ, after various incarnations, occupied the body of Jesus. In the Anthroposophy founded by Rudolf Steiner, Jesus Christ is a central balancing force mediating between the two opposing polarities of evil, namely the fanatical exalted mysticism of Lucifer, and the cold materialism of Ahriman.

Atheists reject Jesus's divinity, but have different views about him—from challenging his mental health to emphasizing his "moral superiority" (Richard Dawkins).

== Artistic depictions ==
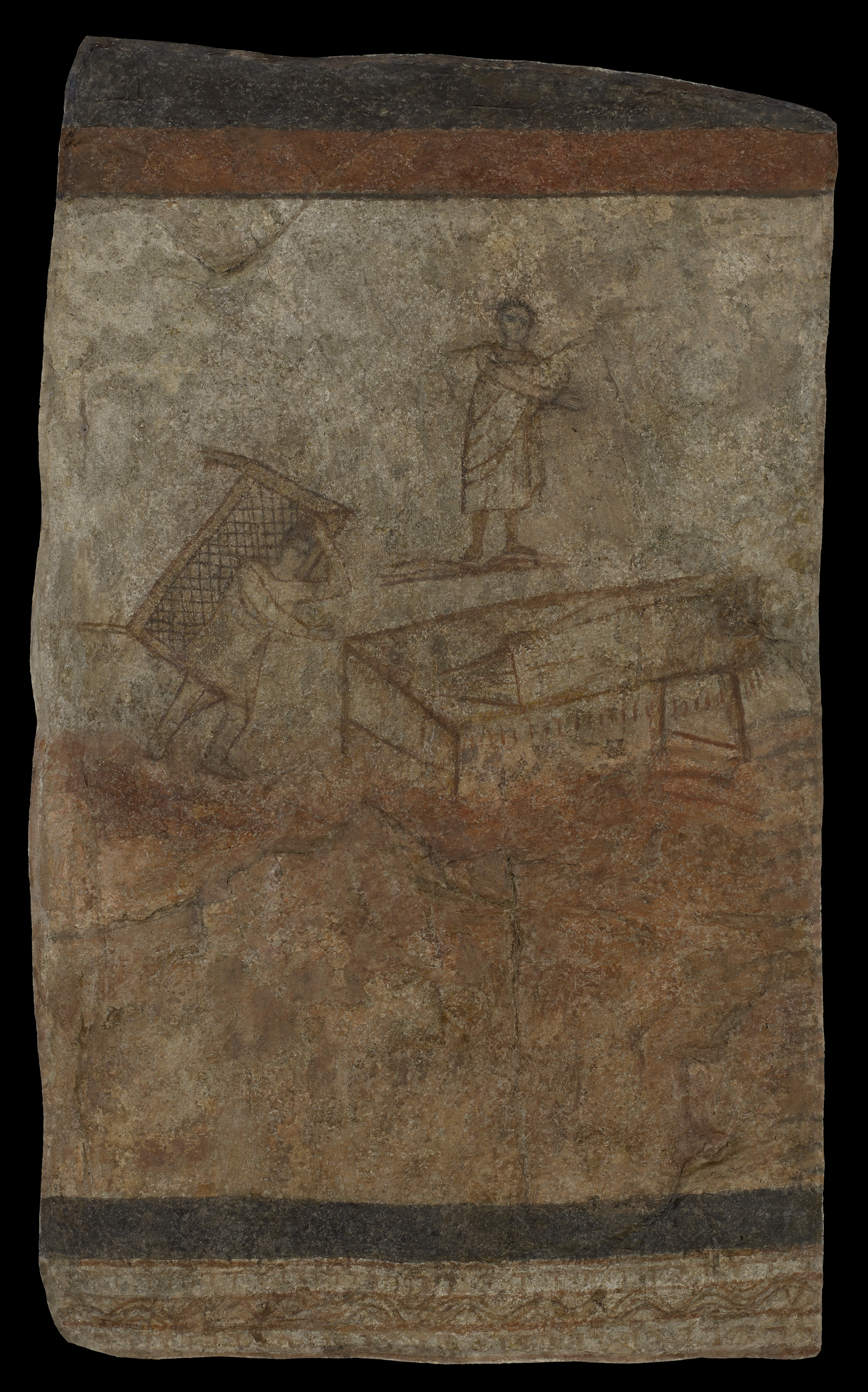
Jesus healing a paralytic in one of the first known images of Jesus from Dura Europos in the third century

As in other Early Christian art, the earliest depictions date to the late second or early third century, and surviving images are found in the Catacombs of Rome. Some of the earliest depictions of Jesus at the Dura-Europos church date to before 256. A wide range of depictions of Jesus appeared during the next two millennia, influenced by cultural settings, political circumstances and theological contexts.

The depiction of Christ in pictorial form was highly controversial in the early Church. (Note: Philip Schaff commenting on Irenaeus, wrote, "This censure of images as a Gnostic peculiarity, and as a heathenish corruption, should be noted." (Footnote 300 on Contr. Her. .I.XXV.6. ANF.)) From the fifth century, flat painted icons became popular in the Eastern Church. The Byzantine Iconoclasm acted as a barrier to developments in the East, but by the ninth century, art was permitted again. The Protestant Reformation brought renewed resistance to imagery, but total prohibition was atypical, and Protestant objections to images have tended to reduce since the 16th century. Although large images are generally avoided, few Protestants now object to book illustrations depicting Jesus. The use of depictions of Jesus is advocated by the leaders of denominations such as Anglicans and Catholics and is a key element of the Eastern Orthodox tradition.

In Eastern Christian art, the Transfiguration was a major theme, with every Eastern Orthodox monk trained in icon painting having to prove his craft by painting an icon depicting it. Icons receive the external marks of veneration, such as kisses and prostration, and they are thought to be powerful channels of divine grace.

In Western Europe, the Renaissance brought forth artists who focused on depictions of Jesus; Fra Angelico and others followed Giotto in the systematic development of uncluttered images. Before the Protestant Reformation, the crucifix was common in Western Christianity. It is a model of the cross with Jesus crucified on it. The crucifix became the central ornament of the altar in the 13th century, a use that has been nearly universal in Roman Catholic churches since then.

== Associated relics ==
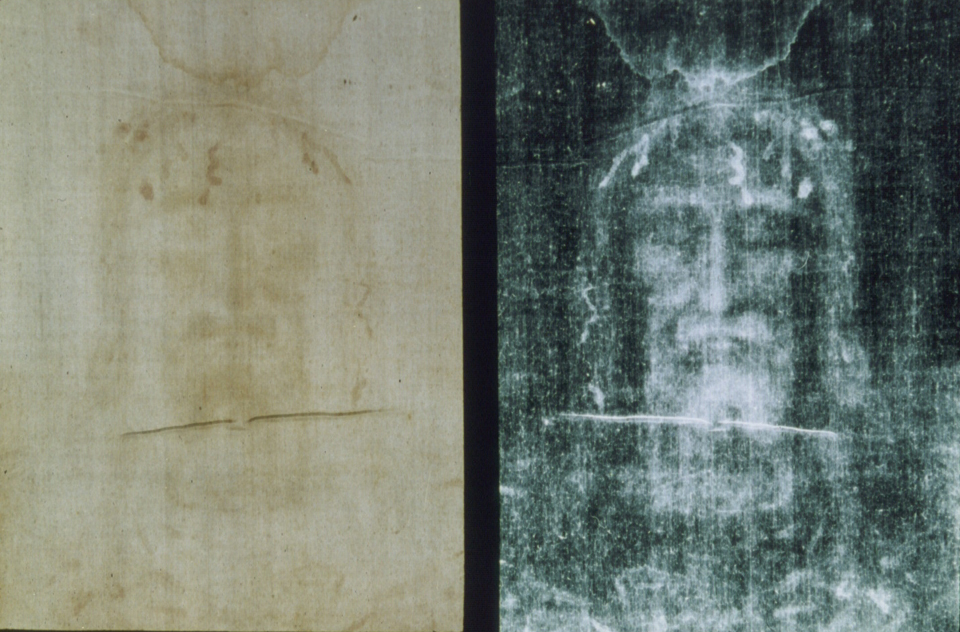
The Shroud of Turin, Italy, is the best-known claimed relic of Jesus and one of the most studied artefacts in human history.

The total destruction that ensued with the siege of Jerusalem by the Romans in AD 70 made the survival of items from first-century Judea very rare, and almost no direct records survive about the history of Judaism from the last part of the first century to the second century. (Note: Flavius Josephus writing (about 5 years later, c. AD 75) in The Jewish War (Book VII 1.1) stated that Jerusalem had been flattened to the point that "there was left nothing to make those that came thither believe it had ever been inhabited". And once what was left of the ruins of Jerusalem had been turned into the Roman settlement of Aelia Capitolina, no Jews were allowed to set foot in it.) Biblical scholar Margaret M. Mitchell writes that, although Eusebius (fourth century) reports (Ecclesiastical History III 5.3) that the early Christians left Jerusalem for Pella just before Jerusalem was subjected to the final lockdown, we must accept that no items from the early Jerusalem Church have survived. Paranormal investigator Joe Nickell writes, "as investigation after investigation has shown, not a single, reliably authenticated relic of Jesus exists." (Note: Polarized conclusions regarding the Shroud of Turin remain. According to former Nature editor Philip Ball, "it's fair to say that, despite the seemingly definitive tests in 1988, the status of the Shroud of Turin is murkier than ever. Not least, the nature of the image and how it was fixed on the cloth remain deeply puzzling.")

Throughout the history of Christianity, relics attributed to Jesus have been claimed, but doubt has been cast on them. The 16th-century Catholic theologian Erasmus wrote sarcastically about the proliferation of relics and the number of buildings that could have been constructed from the wood claimed to be from the cross used in the Crucifixion. Similarly, while experts debate whether Jesus was crucified with three nails or four, at least thirty holy nails are venerated as relics across Europe.

Some relics, such as purported remnants of the crown of thorns placed on the head of Jesus, receive only a modest number of pilgrims, while the Shroud of Turin (which is associated with an approved Catholic devotion to the Holy Face of Jesus), has received millions, including the popes John Paul II and Benedict XVI.

== See also ==
- Jesuism – Religious belief
- Jesus in comparative mythology – Comparative mythology study of Jesus
- Jewish views on Jesus – Judaism's views on the central figure of Christianity
- Simon of Cyrene – Man who was forced by the Romans to carry the cross of Jesus
- Last Adam – Title of Jesus
- Life of Christ in art – Set of subjects in art
- Liminal deity – Deity who is a crosser of boundaries
- List of books about Jesus
- List of founders of religious traditions
- List of messiah claimants
- List of people claimed to be Jesus
- List of people who have been considered deities
- List of statues of Jesus
- Outline of Jesus
- Sexuality and marital status of Jesus
