= Criterion of contextual credibility =

Principle of Biblical criticism

The criterion of contextual credibility, also variously called the criterion of Semitisms and Palestinian background or the criterion of Semitic language phenomena and Palestinian environment is a tool used by Biblical scholars to help determine whether certain actions or sayings by Jesus in the New Testament are from the Historical Jesus. Simply put, if a tradition about Jesus does not fit the linguistic, cultural, historical, and social environment of Jewish Aramaic-speaking 1st-century Palestine, it is probably not authentic. The linguistic and the environmental criteria are treated separately by some scholars, but taken together by others.

The criterion emerged as separate but interrelated criteria: the 'criterion of Semitic language phenomena' (first introduced in 1925 by C. F. Burney), followed by and linked to the 'criterion of Palestinian environment' by scholars such as Joachim Jeremias (1947), in the period between the so-called 'first' and 'second' quest for the historical Jesus (1906–1953).

== Description ==
Several preliminary discussions and inquiries into whether and how the Greek phrases in the New Testament must be translatable back to Aramaic and make sense in that language in order to allow for the possibility that Jesus had really said them, go back to the 17th century, and some early attempts to do so were thoroughly assessed and dismissed by Albert Schweitzer in The Quest of the Historical Jesus (1906). However, according to Stanley E. Porter, it was C. F. Burney (1925) who reignited the scholarly debate by formulating the 'criterion of Semitic language phenomena', soon joined by Jeremias, who added the environmental features of Palestine, and then others.

Jeremias's criterion of traces of Aramaic evaluates a biblical saying based on the presence of possibly Aramaic vocabulary or grammar, while the similar criterion of the Palestinian environment considers a saying authentic if it fits in the Palestinian setting of Jesus' time. The linguistic criterion observes that the New Testament was written in Koine Greek but contains a high number of words and phrases known as Semitisms: a combination of poetic or vernacular Koine Greek with Hebrew and Aramaic influences. Semitism is the linguistic usage, in Greek or in a non-Greek fashion, of an expression or construction typical of Hebrew or Aramaic. In other words, a Semitism is Greek in Hebrew or Aramaic style. The environmental criterion observes features mentioned in the sources that point to the origin of the tradition in Palestine. However, when combinations of certain linguistic, geographical, or historical elements in a tradition produce anachronisms, anatopisms, or other impossibilities, the tradition defies contextual credibility.

John P. Meier (1991) defined a 'criterion of traces of Aramaic' and a 'criterion of Palestinian environment', noting they are closely connected. Bart D. Ehrman (1999) combined them into the 'criterion of contextual credibility'. This "asserts that traditions are more likely to be reliable if they conform well to what is known of the historical and social situation of the time", namely, 1st-century Palestine. Arthur J. Bellinzoni (2016) distinguished a 'criterion of Semitism or Aramaism' for all linguistic issues, and a 'criterion of contextual credibility' for 'the historical, political, social, and religious contexts' of Jesus as "a Galilean Jew ... in Roman Palestine for a brief period around 30", with which documents must be consistent.

== Examples of its use ==
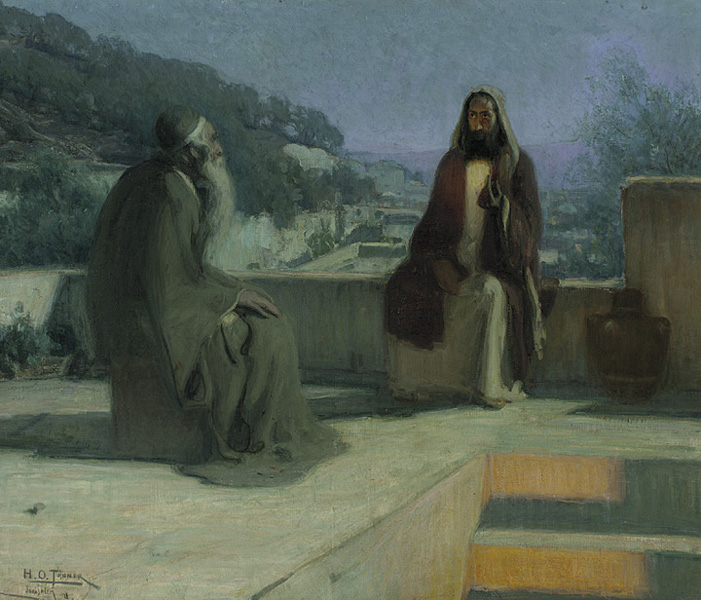
Nicodemus (left) talking to Jesus. Painting (1899) by Henry Ossawa Tanner

Matthew begins with a Hebrew gematria (a method of interpreting Hebrew by computing the numerical value of words). In Matthew 1:1, Jesus is designated "the son of David, the son of Abraham". The numerical value of David's name in Hebrew is 14 (דוד = 4 + 6 + 4), so this genealogy has 14 generations from Abraham to David, 14 from David to the Babylonian exile, and 14 from the exile to the Christ (Matthew 1:17). Such linguistic peculiarities tie New Testament texts to Aramaic-speaking Jews (with knowledge of the Hebrew Bible, or Septuagint translations) in 1st-century Palestine.

Ehrman (1999) cited the conversation between Nicodemus and Jesus in chapter 3 of the Gospel of John: their confusion is based on the multiple meanings of the Greek word ανωθεν/anothen ('again' and 'from above'), but in 1st-century Palestine, they would have spoken Aramaic, which has no word with the same double meaning; therefore, the conversation could not have taken place as narrated. Another example given is saying 37 of the Coptic Gospel of Thomas, which says: "When you undress without being ashamed, and you take your clothes and put them under your feet as little children and tramp on them, then you shall see the Son of the Living one, and you shall not fear." This saying fits the (Egyptian) 2nd-century context, when a Gnostic myth, which could make sense of the saying, was influential, but it does not fit the early 1st-century Palestinian context of Jesus. Likewise, the Gospel of Peter claims that Jesus was crucified by Herod Antipas (tetrarch of Galilee and Perea), rather than Pontius Pilate (Roman governor of Judea), which contradicts what is known about how the Romans governed their provinces and thus fails the criterion of contextual credibility, aside from also failing the criteria of independent attestation (because all other early sources hold Pilate responsible) and dissimilarity (because it serves the author's demonstrable anti-Jewish bias).

Bellinzoni (2016) argued that the words "take up their cross" in Mark 8:34 failed the criterion of dissimilarity and may thus represent an interpolation (perhaps inserted into the tradition before the author of the Gospel of Mark wrote it down), but that, when these words are removed, the rest of the verse ("If any want to become my followers, let them deny themselves ... and follow me") 'meets the criterion of Aramaism or Semitism and the criterion of contextual credibility, meaning that Jesus could definitely have spoken these words to his followers in Aramaic.'

== Limitations ==
Meier (1991) warned that the linguistic and the environmental criteria are best applied in the negative sense, as the linguistic, social, and cultural environment of Palestine did not suddenly change after the death of Jesus and so traditions that were invented in Palestine during the first few decades after Jesus's death may misleadingly appear contextually authentic. Ehrman (1999) agreed: "Unlike the other two criteria [of independent attestation and dissimilarity], this one serves a strictly negative function ... to argue against a tradition, on the grounds that it does not conform to what we know about the historical and social context of Jesus' life."

== See also ==
- Criterion of dissimilarity
- Criterion of embarrassment
- Criterion of multiple attestation or independent attestation

== Literature ==
- Ehrman, Bart D. (1999). Jesus: Apocalyptic Prophet of the New Millennium. New York: Oxford University Press. ISBN 978-0-19-512473-6.
- Koester, Helmut (1995). Introduction to the New Testament: Volume 1 (2nd ed.). Berlin: Walter De Gruyter & Co. ISBN 978-3-11014-692-9.
- Meier, John P. (1991). A Marginal Jew: Rethinking the Historical Jesus: Volume 1: The Roots of the Problem and the Person. Anchor Bible Reference Library Series (Reissued ed.). New York: Yale University Press. ISBN 978-0-3001-4018-7.
- Porter, Stanley E. (2004). The Criteria for Authenticity in Historical-Jesus Research. New York: T&T Clark International. ISBN 978-0-56704-360-3.
- Shepherd, Michael B. (2018). "Semitic Wordplay behind the Greek of the New Testament". In Winstead, Melton Bennett (ed.). New Testament Philology: Essays in Honor of David Alan Black. Eugene, Oregon: Pickwick Publications. ISBN 978-1-4982-4487-9.
