= Quest for the historical Jesus =

Academic efforts to determine what words and actions, if any, may be attributed to Jesus

The quest for the historical Jesus consists of academic efforts to determine what words and actions, if any, may be attributed to Jesus, and to use the findings to provide portraits of the historical Jesus. Since the 18th century, three scholarly quests for the historical Jesus are distinguished, each with distinct characteristics based on the research criteria developed during each phase. These quests differ from earlier approaches because they rely on the historical method to study biblical narratives. While textual analysis of biblical sources had taken place for centuries, the three quests introduced new methods and techniques to establish their validity.

The enthusiasm shown during the first quest diminished after Albert Schweitzer's critique of 1906 in which he pointed out shortcomings in the approaches used at the time. The second quest began in 1953 and introduced new techniques that plateaued in the 1970s. In the 1980s, scholars gradually introduced new ideas, initiating a third quest characterized by the latest research. Since the late 2000s, concerns have been growing over the usefulness of the criteria of authenticity and forecast a more expansive and genuinely interdisciplinary Next Quest.

While there is widespread scholarly agreement on the existence of Jesus (Note: In a 2011 review of the state of modern scholarship, Bart Ehrman (who is a secular agnostic) wrote: "He certainly existed, as virtually every competent scholar of antiquity, Christian or non-Christian, agrees") and a basic consensus on the general outline of his life, the portraits of Jesus constructed during the quests have often differed from each other and from the image portrayed in the gospels. There are overlapping attributes among the portraits and, while pairs of scholars may agree on some attributes, those same scholars may differ on other attributes. There is no single portrait of the historical Jesus that satisfies most scholars.

== Quests ==
Conventionally, since the 18th century three scholarly quests for the historical Jesus have been distinguished, each with distinct characteristics and based on different research criteria, which were often developed during each specific phase. According to Tucker Ferda, it is by now "conventional wisdom that the traditional threefold division of the quest for Jesus [...] is flawed". The threefold terminology uses the literature selectively, poses an incorrect periodization of research which fails to note the socio-cultural context of the so-called first quest, which began with a critical questioning of Christian origins predating Reimarus, in contrast to what Albert Schweitzer had claimed.

=== First quest ===
==== Lives of Jesus ====
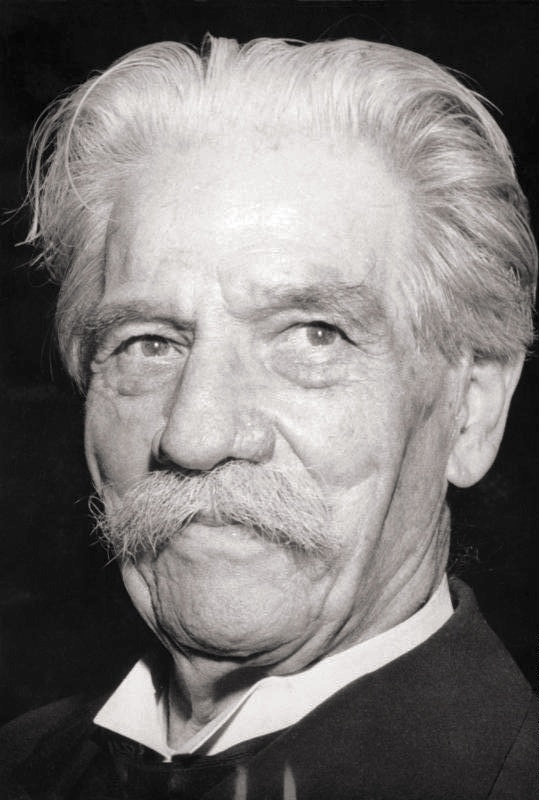
Albert Schweitzer's book The Quest of the Historical Jesus introduced the term

As the Enlightenment ended, various scholars in Europe began to go beyond textual analysis and the development of gospel harmonies and began to produce biographies of Jesus typically referred to as Lives of Jesus. These biographies attempted to apply some historical techniques to a harmonized version of the gospel accounts and produced new overviews of the life of Jesus. These attempts at constructing a biography of Jesus came to be known as the first "quest for the historical Jesus", a term effectively coined by Albert Schweitzer's book, which was originally titled The Quest of the Historical Jesus: A Critical Study of Its Progress from Reimarus to Wrede.

By the late 19th century, hundreds of Lives of Jesus had been written. Some of these were purely sensational: They were not produced because any new data had appeared, but because some people read and interpreted the gospels in new ways. These stories of the Lives of Jesus were often romanticized, highly psychological or included new elements which did not appear in any of the gospels or other historical documents. For example, Ernest Renan used the incident where Jesus rides a donkey during his triumphal entry into Jerusalem to build a story in which Jesus the carpenter was a gentle prophet who had a donkey in Galilee and rode it while traveling between its different towns.

Mark Powell states that the production of these Lives of Jesus were typically driven by three elements: 1. the imposition of a grand scheme (e.g. Jesus as a reformer) which dictated the theme of the work and in terms of which the gospels were interpreted; 2. the exclusion of those parts of the gospel accounts that did not fit in the scheme; 3. the addition of new material which did not appear in any of the gospels to fill in the gaps in the story. Andreas J. Köstenberger stated that in many cases these stories portrayed Jesus "like the questers themselves" rather than a first-century Jewish figure.

The underlying theme used by the authors of the various Lives of Jesus during the first quest varied. In some cases it aimed to praise Christianity, in other cases to attack it. One of the earliest notable publications in the field was by Hermann Reimarus (1694–1768) who portrayed Jesus as a less than successful political figure who assumed his destiny was to place God as the king of Israel. Reimarus wrote a treatise which rejected miracles and accused the Bible authors of fraud, but he did not publish this. Later, Gotthold Lessing (1729–1781) posthumously published Reimarus' thesis. Baron d'Holbach (1723–1789) who had no interest in recovering a historical Jesus but to criticize religion wrote Ecce Homo! Or, A Critical Inquiry into the History of Jesus Christ; Being a Rational Analysis of the Gospels and published it anonymously in Amsterdam in 1769. The book was translated into English by George Houston, and published in 1799 and then 1813, for which Houston (who confessed himself to be the author) was condemned for blasphemy to two years in prison.

==== Search for the historical Jesus ====
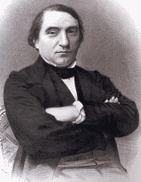
Ernest Renan, whose book was one of the most popular 19th-century Lives of Jesus

David Strauss (1808–1874), at the age of 27 years, pioneered the search for the "Historical Jesus" by rejecting all supernatural events as mythical elaborations. His 1835 work, Life of Jesus, was one of the first and most influential systematic analyses of the life story of Jesus, aiming to base it on unbiased historical research. Strauss viewed the miraculous accounts of Jesus' life in the gospels in terms of myths which had arisen as a result of the community's imagination as it retold stories and represented natural events as miracles. Albert Schweitzer wrote in The Quest of the Historical Jesus (1906; 1910) that Strauss's arguments "filled in the death-certificates of a whole series of explanations which, at first sight, have all the air of being alive, but are not really so". He added that there are two broad periods of academic research in the quest for the historical Jesus, namely, "the period before David Strauss and the period after David Strauss". Among the works that appeared after Strauss, Ernest Renan's book Vie de Jesus, which combined scholarship with sentimental and novelistic psychological interpretation, was very successful and had eight re-printings in three months. Renan merged gospel narratives with his own psychological interpretations, e.g. that Jesus preached a "sweet theology of love" in Galilee, but turned into a revolutionary once he encountered the establishment in Jerusalem.

Johannes Weiss (1863–1914) and William Wrede (1859–1906) brought the eschatological aspects of the ministry of Jesus to the attention of the academic world. Both Weiss and Wrede were passionately anti-liberal and their presentations aimed to emphasize the unusual nature of the ministry and teachings of Jesus. Wrede wrote on the Messianic Secret theme in the Gospel of Mark and argued that it was a method used by early Christians to explain Jesus not claiming himself as the Messiah.

Albert Kalthoff (1850–1906), in the chapter "Was There An Historical Jesus?" of his 1904 work, How Christianity arose. New contributions to the Christ-problem (published in English 1907 as The rise of Christianity) wrote, "A Son of God, Lord of the World, born of a virgin, and rising again after death, and the son of a small builder with revolutionary notions, are two totally different beings. If one was the historical Jesus, the other certainly was not. The real question of the historicity of Jesus is not merely whether there ever was a Jesus among the numerous claimants of a Messiahship in Judea, but whether we are to recognise the historical character of this Jesus in the Gospels, and whether he is to be regarded as the founder of Christianity."

Albert Schweitzer (1875–1965), a historian of theology, presented an important critical review of the history of the search for Jesus's life in The Quest of the Historical Jesus – From Reimarus to Wrede (1906, 1st ed.), denouncing the subjectivity of the various writers who injected their own preferences in Jesus' character. There is one chapter (Ch. 10) on the two-source hypothesis of Christian Hermann Weisse and the Wilke hypothesis of Christian Gottlob Wilke and three chapters to David Strauss (Ch. 7, 8, and 9), as well as a full chapter to Bruno Bauer (Ch. 11). Bruno Bauer (1809–1882) was the first academic theologian to assert the non-historicity of Jesus. However his scholarship was buried by German academia, and he remained a pariah, until Albert Kalthoff rescued his works from neglect and obscurity. Schweitzer highly praised Bauer's early work, prior to his later period work and conclusion regarding the ahistoricity of Jesus.

==== Christ myth theory ====
A direct challenge to the first quest was The Christ Myth, first published in 1909 by Arthur Drews on the Christ myth theory and the denial of the existence of a historical Jesus. Drews, by amplifying and publicizing the thesis initially advanced by Bruno Bauer, rose to international prominence from the resulting international controversy provoked by his book. In 1912, Shirley Jackson Case noted that within the last decade, doubts about Jesus' existence had been advanced in several quarters, but nowhere so insistently as in Germany where the skeptical movement had become a regular propaganda, "Its foremost champion is Arthur Drews, professor of philosophy in Karlsruhe Technical High School. Since the appearance of his Christusmythe in 1909 the subject has been kept before the public by means of debates held in various places, particularly at some important university centers such as Jena, Marburg, Giessen, Leipzig, Berlin."

To discuss Drews's thesis, Schweitzer added two new chapters in the 1913 second edition of his work, The Quest of the Historical Jesus. (Geschichte der Leben-Jesu-Forschung, 2. Auflage, 1913)

- Ch. 22, (pp. 451–499), "The New Denial of the Historicity of Jesus" (Die Neueste Bestreitung der Geschichtlichkeit Jesu) analyzes Drews's thesis, plus eight writers in support of Drews's thesis about the non-existence of Jesus: J. M. Robertson, Peter Jensen, Andrzej Niemojewski, Christian Paul Fuhrmann, W.B. Smith, Thomas Whittaker, G.J.P.J. Bolland, Samuel Lublinski. Three of them favor mythic-astral explanations.
- Ch. 23 (pp. 500–560), "The Debate About the Historicity of Jesus" (Die Diskussion über die Geschichtlichkeit Jesu), reviews the publications of 40 theologians/scholars in response to Drews, and mentions the participants in the February 1910 public debate. Most of the publications are critical and negative. Schweitzer continues his systematic exposure of the problems and difficulties in the theories of the Bestreiter ("challengers') and Verneiner ("deniers") – the Dutch Radicals, J. M. Robertson, W. B. Smith and Drews – and the authenticity of Paul's epistles and Paul's historicity as well.

Schweitzer himself also argued that all the 19th-century presentations of Jesus had either minimized or neglected the apocalyptic message of Jesus, and he developed his own version of the profile of Jesus in the Jewish apocalyptic context.

==== Final act of the first quest ====
Schweitzer's work was preceded by Martin Kähler's book The So-Called Historical Jesus and the Historic Biblical Christ which was published in 1896. Kähler argued that it was not possible to separate the Jesus of history from the Christ of faith and that in any case, the key goal of biblical analysis should be to better understand the Christ of faith who had influenced history. Kähler's work appealed to both conservatives and liberals and its combined effect with Schweitzer's book effectively ended the first quest.

=== Period of no quest ===
Schweitzer's 1906 critique undermined the previous attempts in historical Jesus research, and is often seen as the start of a period of "no quest" lasting until Ernst Käsemann's 1953 lecture which started the second quest. Ben Witherington states that at the end of the first quest, historical Jesus research was assumed to be dead, although that did not turn out to be the case.

Some scholars such as Paul Zahl argue that the last two paragraphs of Schweitzer's book aptly summarize the end of the first quest, Schweitzer stating "Jesus of Nazareth will not suffer himself to be modernized as a historical figure... He comes to us as One unknown". Zahl likens the first quest to the Scott expedition to Antarctica, and states that the first quest ended as a total disaster, slowing down academic efforts to pursue research into the historical Jesus. However, other scholars such as Stanley Porter or Dale Allison disagree with that assessment, or the separation in terms of these phases.

Stanley Porter states that Schweitzer's critique only ended the "romanticized and overly psychologized" studies into the life of Jesus, and other research continued. Dale Allison states that other research did take place during the so-called no quest phase, and the progress was continuous in that every year except 1919 a new academic book on Jesus was published. Maurice Casey states that although it may at first appear reasonable to call this a period of "no quest" that characterization is not accurate and in this period significant other progress was made, e.g. B. H. Streeter's work on Markan priority and Q source which affected future research.

A key figure in the relatively quiet period from 1906 to 1953 was Rudolf Bultmann, who was skeptical regarding the relevance and necessity of historical Jesus research and argued that the only thing we can or need to know about Jesus is the "thatness" (German: Dass) of his existence and very little else. Bultmann argued that all that matters is the "thatness", not the "whatness" in that only that Jesus existed, preached and died by crucifixion matters, not what happened throughout his life. Bultmann was also a supporter of the study of the oral traditions that transmitted the gospels.

Bultmann believed that only a few scattered facts could be known about Jesus, and although a few things could be known about Jesus such a search was pointless for all that matters is following "the call of Jesus" which can only be known through an existential encounter with the word of God. Bultmann argued that the earliest Christian literature showed little interest in specific locations and that the study of Jesus through historical analysis was not only impossible, but unnecessary. However, in the end Bultmann did not totally close the door on historical research and by 1948 suggested the possibility of further investigation.

=== Second quest ===
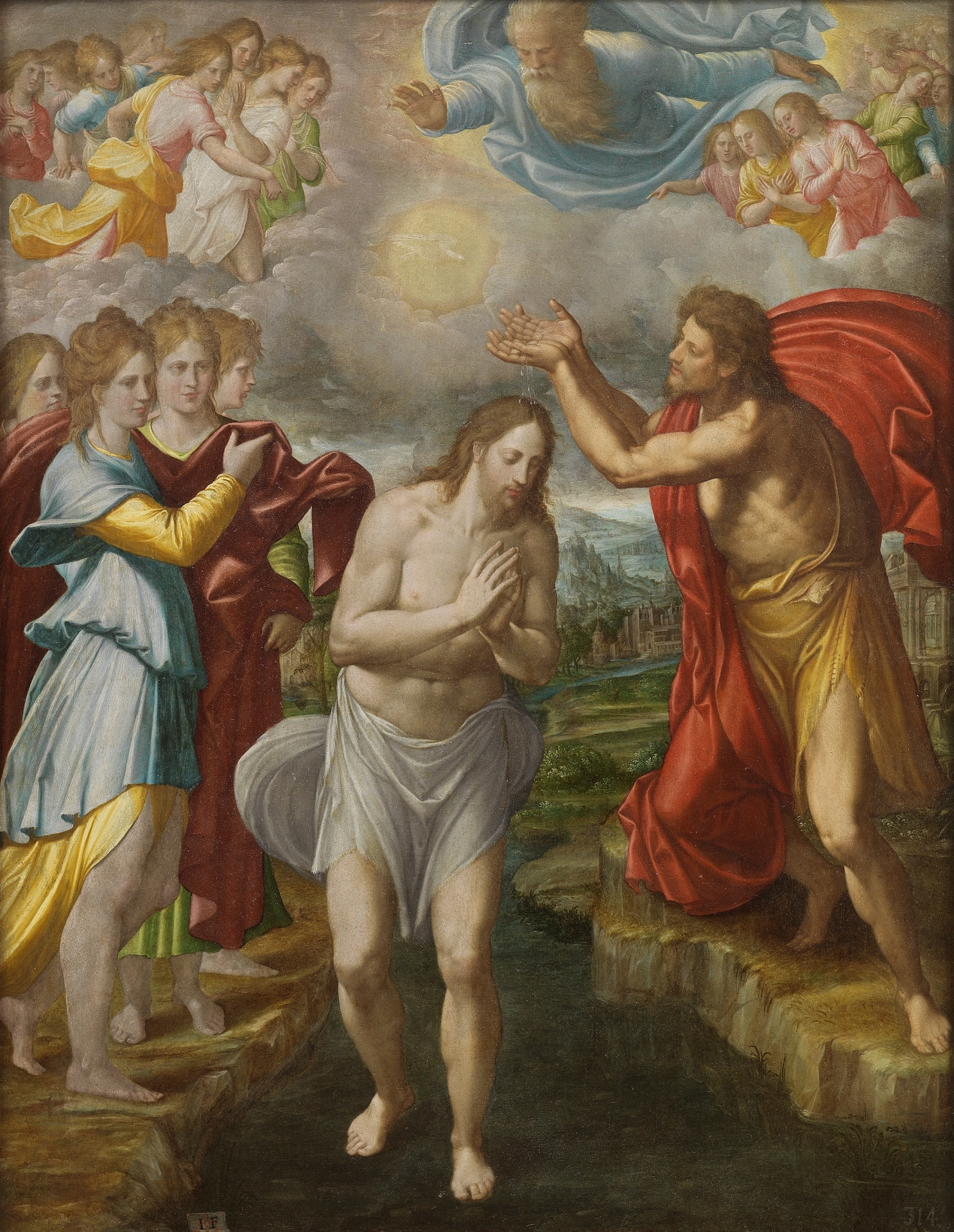
The criterion of embarrassment developed during the second quest was applied to the Baptism of Jesus, depicted here in a c. 1567 painting by Juan Fernández Navarrete.

While the exact date for the start of the first or third quest may be questioned, the beginning of the second quest has a well known time and location, namely Ernst Käsemann's October 20, 1953 lecture titled "The Problem of the Historical Jesus", delivered to an annual gathering of alumni from the University of Marburg who, like Käsemann, has studied with Rudolf Bultmann.

Käsemann's lecture marked a departure from the teachings of his former professor Bultmann who emphasized theology and in 1926 had argued that historical Jesus research was both futile and unnecessary; although Bultmann slightly modified that position in a later book. Käsemann advanced the position that although the gospels may be interpreted for theological purposes, they still contain historical memories which can yield information about Jesus. This perspective effectively began what was then known as the "New Quest" and later came to be called the second quest for the historical Jesus. Most of the scholars involved in the second quest were either German or trained by Germans.

Käsemann's perspective that it is possible to know something about Jesus if the tools of historical analysis are applied in a systematic manner proved highly consequential and inspired a number of scholars to develop new approaches to the study of the historical Jesus. One of the influential works that followed his approach was Günther Bornkamm's 1956 book Jesus of Nazareth and his well-known statement that "what the Gospels report concerning the message, the deeds and the history of Jesus is still distinguished by an authenticity... these features point us directly to the earthly figure of Jesus" provided momentum for the second quest in the 1960s. James M. Robinson's 1959 book A New Quest for the Historical Jesus was reprinted numerous times, indicating the high level of interest in the subject during the 1960s.

In order to analyze biblical passages, Käsemann introduced the criterion of dissimilarity, that compares a gospel passage (e.g. a statement by Jesus) to the Jewish context of the time, and if dissimilar, places weight on its being on safe ground. During the second quest the criterion of embarrassment was also introduced. This criterion states that a group is unlikely to invent a story that would be embarrassing to themselves. For instance, this criterion argues that the early Christian Church would have never wanted to invent the kernel of the story about the Baptism of Jesus because John baptised for the remission of sins, and Jesus was viewed as without sin, hence the story served no purpose, and would have been an embarrassment given that it positioned John above Jesus. While the baptism of Jesus itself is a historical event, the presence of the dove and the voice from Heaven may be later embellishments to the original happening. Marcello Craveri's "Life of Jesus" in 1967, based on the Dead Sea Scrolls, argued that the claims to divinity made by the historical Jesus were strictly limited and not unusual for a Jew of that generation. Much of the stronger claims, and the emphasis on the redeeming power of Christ's death on the Cross, could be seen as reworkings by St. Paul, who was probably influenced strongly by the Graeco-Roman traditions.

=== Third quest ===
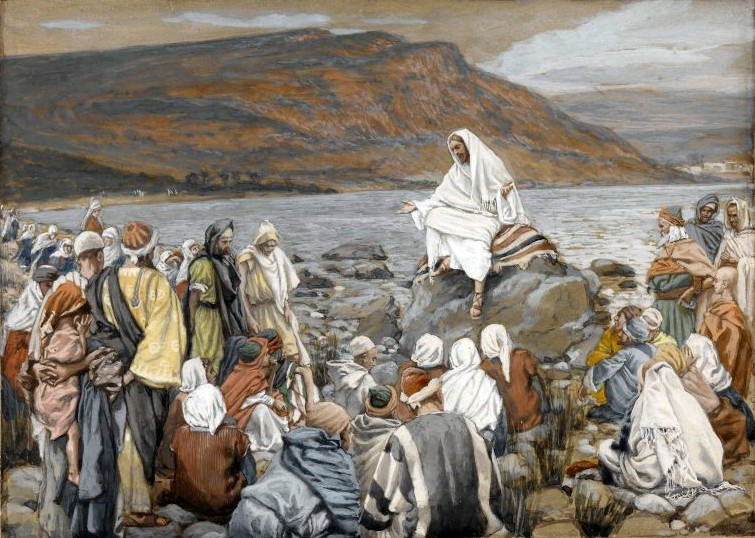
"Jesus Teaches the People by the Sea", a painting by James Tissot, c. 1890

By the early 1970s the initial momentum of the second quest had all but disappeared. A number of scholars attribute the end of this quest to the diminishing role of Bultmann's ideas, Ben Witherington stating: "As the towering influence of Bultmann and the enthusiasm for existentialism began to wane, so did the enthusiasm for the Second Quest". Geza Vermes stated: "Owing to the colossal influence of Bultmann on German, and subsequently through his former students on North American, New Testament learning, the clock of real historical research stopped for half a century" and that it started again only after that influence had ended. Paul Zahl stated that while the second quest made significant contributions at the time, its results are now mostly forgotten, although not disproven.

==== Palestinian Judaism ====
The 1977 publication of E.P. Sanders, Paul and Palestinian Judaism, renewed interest in the historical Jesus, and initiated a third quest. Unlike the second quest, the third quest had no well-defined beginning and emerged as a number of scholars presented new approaches within a relatively short time of each other. In 1982, N. T. Wright coined the term "third quest" to refer to these new approaches.

The third quest yielded new insights into Jesus' Palestinian and Jewish context, and not so much on the person of Jesus himself. It also has made clear that all material on Jesus has been handed down by the emerging Church, raising questions about the criterion of dissimilarity, and the possibility of ascribing material solely to Jesus, and not to the emerging Church. Even so, the criteria of authenticity reigned supreme during this period of the quest.

=== The Next Quest ===
In 2021, James Crossley (editor of the Journal for the Study of the Historical Jesus) announced that historical Jesus scholarship now had moved to the era of the Next Quest. The Next Quest has moved on from the criteria, obsessions with the uniqueness of Jesus, and the supersessionism still implicit in scholarly questions of the Jewishness of Jesus. Instead, sober scholarship now focuses on treating the subject matter as part of the wider human phenomenon of religion, cultural comparison, class relations, slave culture and economy, memory studies, and the social history of historical Jesus scholarship and wider reception histories of the historical Jesus. The book by Crossley and Robert J. Myles, Jesus: A Life in Class Conflict, is indicative of this new tendency.

Others have criticized claims of a Fourth Quest and had a more measured response to critique of the criteria. The actual problem is arguably that critics use them inappropriately, trying to describe the history of minute portions of the Gospel text, rather than a true flaw in the historical logic of the criteria. According to Tucker Ferda, "...criticisms of the criteria have sometimes produced rather grandiose claims about their "uselessness," which do not seem justified when one looks at the kind of argument that those same critics will use when making positive claims about the historical Jesus...criticisms of the notion of "authenticity" or "historicity" can create the impression that there is more disagreement with earlier research than is actually the case."

==== Demise of authenticity ====
Since the late 2000s, concerns have been growing about the usefulness of the criteria of authenticity. According to Keith, the criteria are literary tools, indebted to form criticism, not historiographic tools. They were meant to discern pre-Gospel traditions, not to identify historical facts, but have "substituted the pre-literary tradition with that of the historical Jesus." According to Le Donne, the usage of such criteria is a form of "positivist historiography." However, scholars who reject or marginalize the criteria are not monolithic and some wish to rebuild the criteria and use it with memory studies.

==== Memory studies ====
James D. G. Dunn's 2003 study, Jesus Remembered, was the onset for an "increased [...] interest in memory theory and eyewitness testimony." Dunn argues that "[t]he only realistic objective for any 'quest of the historical Jesus' is Jesus remembered." Dunn argues that Christianity started with the impact Jesus had on his followers, shaping their memories of him, which were passed on through oral tradition. According to Dunn, to understand the person and impact of Jesus, scholars must look at "the broad picture, focusing on the characteristic motifs and emphases of the Jesus tradition, rather than making findings overly dependent on individual items of the tradition." According to Dunn, the remembered Jesus was Jewish, set in first-century Palestine. Central in Jesus' message was the idea of an inclusive Kingdom of God, which was already coming into existence. Dunn deems it possible that "talk of rejection (the prophetic tradition), of the son of man suffering, and of a cup to be drunk and a baptism to be endured began in greater or less part with Jesus himself reflecting on his own destiny."

Chris Keith, Le Donne, and others (Note: Van Eck (2015) mentions Crook 2013; Foster 2012, 2013; Keith 2011; 2012a, 2012b; Rodríguez 2012, 2013); Le Donne (2011; 2012a; 2012b); Schröter (1996; 2012; 2013).) argue for a "social memory" approach, which argues that memories are shaped by socially determined interpretative frameworks, which are shaped by the needs of the present. Any Gospel unit is shaped and interpreted by the ones who remember; the distinction between "authentic" and "inauthentic" is therefore useless. Instead of searching for a historical Jesus, scholarship should investigate how the memories of Jesus were shaped, and how they were reshaped "with the aim of cohesion and the self-understanding (identity) of groups."

Anthony Le Donne elaborated on Dunn's thesis, basing "his historiography squarely on Dunn's thesis that the historical Jesus is the memory of Jesus recalled by the earliest disciples." According to Le Donne, memories are fractured, and not exact recalls of the past. Le Donne further argues that the remembrance of events is facilitated by relating it to a common story, or "type." The type shapes how the memories are retained, c.q. narrated. This means the Jesus-tradition is not a theological invention of the early Church, but rather a tradition shaped and refracted through such memory "type."

According to Chris Keith, there are "two competing 'models' for how to use the gospel tradition in order to approach the historical Jesus [...] A first model, inspired by form criticism and still advocated today, attempts to attain a historical Jesus ‘behind’ the interpretations of early Christians. A second model, inspired by advances in historiography and memory theory, posits a historical Jesus who is ultimately unattainable, but can be hypothesized on the basis of the interpretations of the early Christians, and as part of a larger process of accounting for how and why early Christians came to view Jesus in the ways that they did." According to Keith, "these two models are methodologically and epistemologically incompatible," calling into question the methods and aim of the first model.

== Methods ==
=== Textual, source and form-criticism ===
The first quest, which started in 1778, was almost entirely based on biblical criticism. This took the form of textual and source criticism originally, which were supplemented with form criticism in 1919, and redaction criticism in 1948. Form criticism began as an attempt to trace the history of the biblical material during the oral period before it was written in its current form, and may be seen as starting where textual criticism ends. Form criticism views Gospel writers as editors, not authors. Redaction criticism may be viewed as the child of source criticism and form criticism. and views the Gospel writers as authors and early theologians and tries to understand how the redactor(s) has (have) molded the narrative to express their own perspectives.

=== Criteria of authenticity ===
When form criticism questioned the historical reliability of the Gospels, scholars began looking for other criteria. Taken from other areas of study such as source criticism, the "criteria of authenticity" emerged gradually, becoming a distinct branch of methodology associated with life of Jesus research. The criteria are a variety of rules used to determine if some event or person is more or less likely to be historical. These criteria are primarily, though not exclusively, used to assess the sayings and actions of Jesus.

In view of the skepticism produced in the mid-twentieth century by form criticism concerning the historical reliability of the gospels, the burden shifted in historical Jesus studies from attempting to identify an authentic life of Jesus to attempting to prove authenticity. The criteria developed within this framework, therefore, are tools that provide arguments solely for authenticity, not inauthenticity. By 1987, D.Polkow lists 25 separate criteria being used by scholars to test for historical authenticity including the criterion of "historical plausibility". Following the prompt of Chris Keith and Anthony Le Donne, concerns have been growing about the usefulness of the criteria of authenticity, but numerous scholars are divided in that some wish to rebuild the criteria as well along with memory studies James Crossley has argued that "[e]merging from under the rubble of the criteria, we are left with an old fashioned view of interpretation, argument, and the combining of arguments for collective weight to make a general case." Other scholars disagree and state that the criteria are meant to be used with caution and are simply tools for historical plausibility than certainty.

Nonetheless, while the state of the criteria is "hotly debated" among scholars; the criteria and its reasoning are still employed by even scholars who reject or diminish the criteria, indicating that "authenticating criteria are inherent to historiography" in general. Furthermore, a comparative study tested the methodology of Jesus researchers and Greco-Roman historians on how they assessed the trial of Jesus and Julius Caesar crossing the Rubicon. The study concluded that the criteria are used by both fields to test historical probability of events. General historians outside of biblical studies have noted that some of the same criteria existed before New Testament form criticism even existed and that they have been in operation by general historians for more than a century.

==== Dissimilarity ====
In 1901, the application of criteria of authenticity began with dissimilarity. It was often applied unevenly with a preconceived goal. The criterion of dissimilarity or discontinuity says that if a particular saying can be plausibly accounted for as the words or teaching of some other source contemporary to Jesus, it is not thought to be genuine evidence of the historical Jesus. The "Son of Man" sayings are an example. Judaism had a Son of Man concept (as indicated by texts like 1 Enoch 46:2; 48:2–5,10; 52:4; 62:5–9; 69:28–29 and 4 Ezra 13:3ff), but there is no record of the Jews ever applying it to Jesus. The Son of Man is Jesus' most common self-designation in the Gospels, yet none of the New Testament epistles use this expression, nor is there any evidence that the disciples or the early church did. The conclusion is that, by the process of elimination of all other options, it is likely historically accurate that Jesus used this designation for himself.

==== Multiple attestation ====
The criterion of multiple attestation or independent attestation, sometimes also referred to as the cross-sectional method, is a type of source criticism first developed by F. C. Burkitt in 1906. Simply put, the method looks for commonalities in multiple sources with the assumption that, the more sources that report an event or saying, the more likely that event or saying is historically accurate. Burkitt claimed he found 31 independent sayings in Mark and Q. Within Synoptic Gospel studies, this was used to develop the four-source hypothesis. Multiple sources lend support to some level of historicity. New Testament scholar Gerd Theissen says "there is broad scholarly consensus that we can best find access to the historical Jesus through the Synoptic tradition." A second related theory is that of multiple forms. Developed by C. H. Dodd, it focuses on the sayings or deeds of Jesus found in more than one literary form. Bible scholar Andreas J. Köstenberger gives the example of Jesus proclaiming the kingdom of God had arrived. He says it is found in an "aphorism (Mat.5:17), in parables (Mat.9:37–38 and Mark 4:26–29), poetic sayings (Mat.13:16–17), and dialogues (Mat.12:24–28)" and is therefore likely an authentic theme of Jesus' teaching.

==== Contextual credibility (Semitic language and Palestinian environment) ====
A series of language-based criteria have been developed since 1925, when the 'criterion of Semitic language phenomena' was first introduced, followed by and linked to the 'criterion of Palestinian environment' by scholars such as Joachim Jeremias (1947). Jeremias's criterion of traces of Aramaic evaluates a biblical saying based on the presence of possibly Aramaic vocabulary or grammar, while the similar criterion of the Palestinian environment considers a saying authentic if it fits in the Palestinian setting of Jesus' time. The linguistic criterion observers that the New Testament was written in Koine Greek, but contains a high number of words and phrases called Semitisms: a combination of poetic or vernacular koine Greek with Hebrew and Aramaic influences. A Semitism is the linguistic usage, in the Greek in a non-Greek fashion, of an expression or construction typical of Hebrew or Aramaic. In other words, a Semitism is Greek in Hebrew or Aramaic style. The environmental criterion observers features mentioned in the sources that point to origin of the tradition in Palestine. For example, Matthew begins with a Hebrew gematria (a method of interpreting Hebrew by computing the numerical value of words). In Matthew 1:1, Jesus is designated "the son of David, the son of Abraham". The numerical value of David's name in Hebrew is 14; so this genealogy has 14 generations from Abraham to David, 14 from David to the Babylonian exile, and 14 from the exile to the Christ (Matthew 1:17). Such linguistic peculiarities tie New Testament texts to Jews of 1st-century Palestine.

The linguistic and environmental criteria are treated separately by some scholars, but taken together by others (e.g. as 'the criterion of Semitisms and Palestinian background'). John P. Meier (1991) defined a 'criterion of traces of Aramaic' and a 'criterion of Palestinian environment', noting they are closely connected and warning that they are best applied in the negative sense, as the linguistic, social, and cultural environment of Palestine did not suddenly change after the death of Jesus, and so traditions invented inside Palestine in the first few decades after Jesus's death may – misleadingly – appear contextually authentic. Bart D. Ehrman (1999) combined them into the 'criterion of contextual credibility'. This 'asserts that traditions are more likely to be reliable if they conform well to what is known of the historical and social situation of the time', namely 1st-century Palestine. As an example, Ehrman cites the conversation between Nicodemus and Jesus in chapter 3 of the Gospel of John: their confusion is based on the multiple meanings of the Greek word ανωθεν/anothen ('again' and 'from above'), but in 1st-century Palestine they would have spoken Aramaic, which does not have a word with the same double meaning; therefore, the conversation could not have taken place as narrated.

==== Embarrassment ====
The Second Quest introduced the criterion of embarrassment. The criterion of embarrassment is based on the assumption the early church would not have gone out of its way to "create" or "falsify" historical material that only embarrassed its author or weakened its position in arguments with opponents. As historian Will Durant explains:

Despite the prejudices and theological preconceptions of the evangelists, they record many incidents that mere inventors would have concealed – the competition of the apostles for high places in the Kingdom, their flight after Jesus' arrest, Peter's denial, the failure of Christ to work miracles in Galilee, the references of some auditors to his possible insanity, his early uncertainty as to his mission, his confessions of ignorance as to the future, his moments of bitterness, his despairing cry on the cross.

These and other possibly embarrassing events, such as the discovery of the empty tomb by women, Jesus' baptism by John, and the crucifixion itself, are seen by this criterion as lending credence to the supposition the gospels contain some history. The criterion of the crucifixion is related to the criterion of embarrassment. In the first-century Roman empire, only criminals were crucified. The early church referred to death on the cross as a scandal. It is therefore unlikely to have been invented by them.

New Testament scholar Gerd Theissen and theologian Dagmar Winter say one aspect of the criterion of embarrassment is "resistance to tendencies of the tradition". It works on the assumption that what goes against the general tendencies of the early church is historical. For example, criticisms of Jesus go against the tendency of the early church to worship him, making it unlikely the early church community invented statements such as those accusing Jesus of being in league with Satan (Matthew 12:24), or being a glutton and drunkard (Matthew 11:19). Theissen and Winter sum this up with what can also be referred to as enemy attestation: when friends and enemies alike refer to the same events, those events are likely to be historical.

==== Coherence ====
By the 1950s, coherence was also included. The criterion of coherence (also called criterion of consistency or criterion of conformity) can be used only when other material has been identified as authentic. This criterion holds that a saying or action attributed to Jesus may be accepted as authentic if it coheres with other sayings and actions already established as authentic. While this criterion cannot be used alone, it can broaden what scholars believe Jesus said and did. For example, Jesus' teaching in Mark 12:18–27 concerning the resurrection of the dead coheres well with a saying of Jesus in Q on the same subject of the afterlife (reported in Matthew 8:11–12/Luke 13:28–29), as well as other teachings of Jesus on the same subject.

==== Other criteria from the Third Quest ====
Beyond the previous criteria of multiple attestation, dissimilarity (also called discontinuity), context (language and environment), and embarrassment, a number of other criteria have been developed through the third quest. Primary among these are:

- The criterion of rejection and execution was developed in 1985. It is quite different from other criteria and does not directly point to an individual saying or act of Jesus as authentic, but focuses attention on the fact that Jesus was rejected by the Jews and executed by the Romans and then asks what words and deeds would fit into this scenario. John P. Meier stated that this criterion draws attention that a Jesus who did not challenge the authorities of his time would have been unlikely to have been crucified, and thus helps evaluate the sayings of Jesus in that context.
- The criterion of historical plausibility was introduced by Gerd Theissen in 1997; This principle analyzes the plausibility of an event in terms of components such as contextual plausibility and consequential plausibility, i.e. the historical context needs to be suitable, as well as the consequences. In recent research, the criterion of plausibility has found favor among scholars over the criterion of dissimilarity and accounts that fit the historical context are viewed as more likely to be valid.
- The criterion of congruence (also called cumulative circumstantial evidence) is a special case of the older criterion of coherence. The criterion of coherence, also called the criterion of consistency and conformity, looks back at what has already been established as historical, and tests if a new hypothesis is consistent and coherent with what is already known. Thus this criterion is not simply applied to ancient texts as a star but looks back at the results of modern analysis and considers its coherence and consistency. The criterion of congruence lends support to a hypothesis if observations from other data suggest similar conclusions.

A number of other proposed criteria are viewed as dubious and unreliable by third quest scholars. These include the criterion of the vividness of narration, which suggested that a saying expressed in more vivid language than the rest of the surrounding text, it may be an eyewitness declaration; but the criterion is generally rejected by scholars.

=== Other methods ===
Methodological alternatives involving memory studies, hermeneutics, linguistics, cultural studies and more, have been put forth by various scholars as alternatives to the criteria.

==== Memory studies ====
Chris Keith, Le Donne, and others (Note: Van Eck (2015) mentions Crook 2013; Foster 2012, 2013; Keith 2011; 2012a, 2012b; Rodríguez 2012, 2013); Le Donne (2011; 2012a; 2012b); Schröter (1996; 2012; 2013).) argue for a "social memory" approach, which argues that memories are shaped by socially determined interpretative frameworks, which are shaped by the needs of the present. Any Gospel unit is shaped and interpreted by the ones who remember; the distinction between "authentic" and "inauthentic" is therefore useless. Instead of searching for a historical Jesus, scholarship should investigate how the memories of Jesus were shaped, and how they were reshaped "with the aim of cohesion and the self-understanding (identity) of groups."

Rafael Rodriguez states, though not persuaded by revisionist reconstructions, instead of using criteria to isolate historical data in a binary of authenticity of precise details, memory studies provide a wider view to capture "gist" of a historical event (e.g. baptism of Jesus, demonic possession) since the sources only represent how Jesus was remembered (interpreted by early followers).

Anthony Le Donne elaborated on Dunn's thesis, basing "his historiography squarely on Dunn's thesis that the historical Jesus is the memory of Jesus recalled by the earliest disciples." According to Le Donne, memories are fractured, and not exact recalls of the past. Le Donne further argues that the remembrance of events is facilitated by relating it to a common story, or "type." The type shapes how the memories are retained, c.q. narrated. This means the Jesus-tradition is not a theological invention of the early Church, but rather a tradition shaped and refracted through such memory "type."

According to Chris Keith, there are "two competing 'models' for how to use the gospel tradition in order to approach the historical Jesus [...] A first model, inspired by form criticism and still advocated today, attempts to attain a historical Jesus ‘behind’ the interpretations of early Christians. A second model, inspired by advances in historiography and memory theory, posits a historical Jesus who is ultimately unattainable, but can be hypothesized on the basis of the interpretations of the early Christians, and as part of a larger process of accounting for how and why early Christians came to view Jesus in the ways that they did." According to Keith, "these two models are methodologically and epistemologically incompatible," calling into question the methods and aim of the first model.

==== Archaeological and interdisciplinary ====
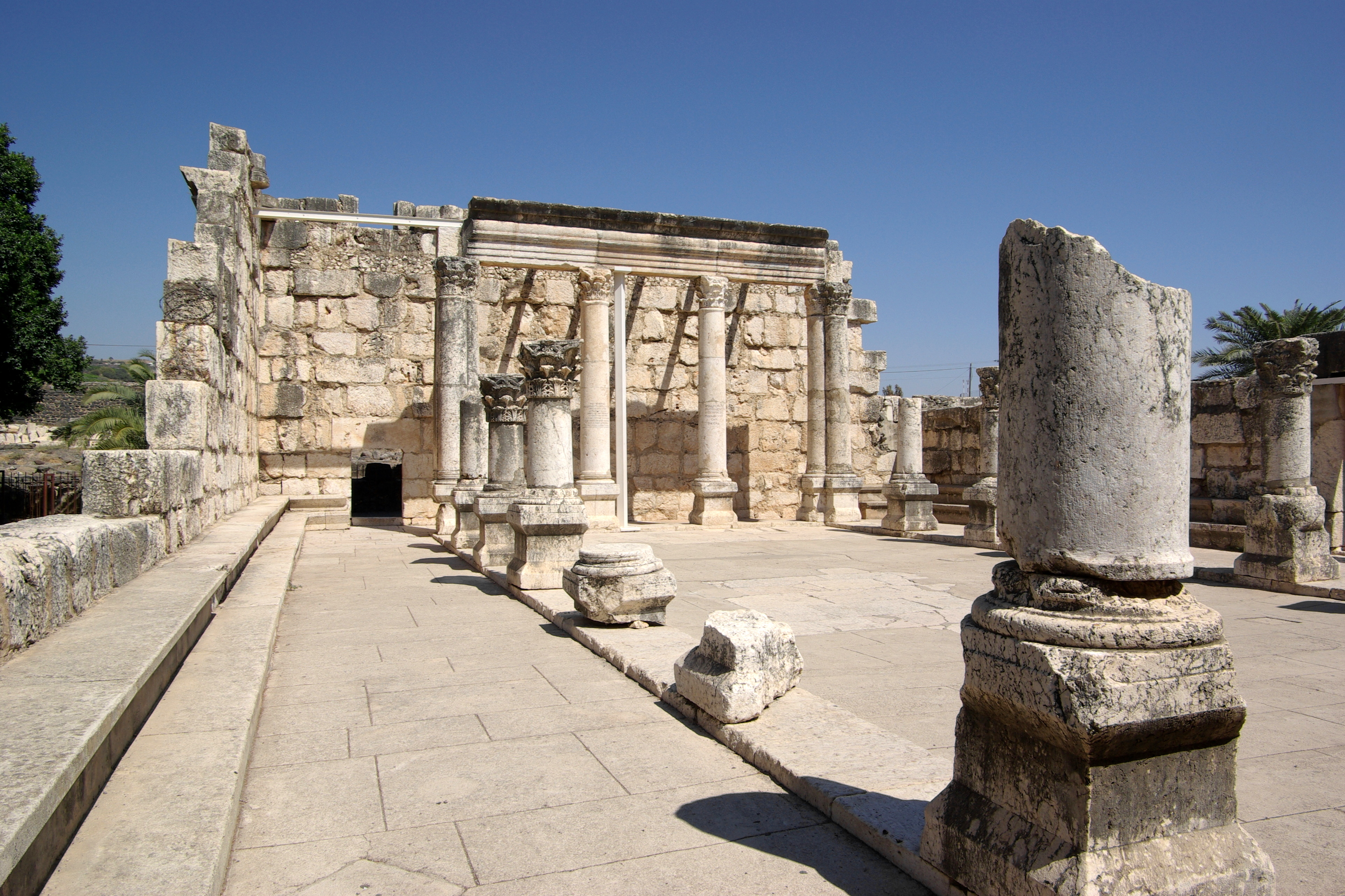
The ancient synagogue at Capernaum

A new characteristic of the modern aspects of the third quest has been the role of archeology and James Charlesworth states that few modern scholars now want to overlook the archaeological discoveries that clarify the nature of life in Galilee and Judea during the time of Jesus. A further characteristic of the third quest has been its interdisciplinary and global nature of the scholarship. While the first two quests were mostly by European Protestant theologians, the third quest has seen a worldwide influx of scholars from multiple disciplines, e.g. Jewish scholars involved in historical Jesus research have contributed their detailed knowledge of Second Temple Judaism as the backdrop for the third quest.

The 21st century has witnessed an increase in scholarly interest in the integrated use of archaeology as an additional research component in arriving at a better understanding of the historical Jesus by illuminating the socio-economic and political background of his age.

Jonathan Reed states that chief contribution of archaeology to the study of the historical Jesus is the reconstruction of his social world. An example archaeological item that Reed mentions is the 1961 discovery of the Pilate Stone, which mentions the Roman prefect Pontius Pilate, by whose order Jesus was crucified.

David Gowler states that an interdisciplinary scholarly study of archeology, textual analysis and historical context can shed light on Jesus and his teachings. An example is the archeological studies at Capernaum. Despite the frequent references to Capernaum in the New Testament, little is said about it there. However, recent archeological evidence show that unlike earlier assumptions, Capernaum was poor and small, without even a forum or agora. This archaeological discovery thus resonates well with the scholarly view that Jesus advocated reciprocal sharing among the destitute in that area of Galilee. Other archeological findings support the wealth of the ruling priests in Judea at the beginning of the 1st century.

== Historical interpretations of Jesus ==
While there is widespread scholarly agreement on the existence of Jesus as a historical figure, the portraits of Jesus constructed during the three quests have often differed from each other and from the image portrayed in the gospel accounts. Amy-Jill Levine states that despite the differing portraits, there is a general scholarly consensus on the basic outline of Jesus' life in that most scholars agree that Jesus was baptized by John the Baptist, debated Jewish authorities on the subject of God, performed some healings, taught in parables, gathered followers and was crucified by Roman prefect Pontius Pilate.

The many differences of emphasis among mainstream interpretations in the third quest may be grouped together based on a number of primary interpretations of Jesus as variously an apocalyptic prophet, charismatic healer, cynic philosopher, Jewish Messiah or prophet of social change. However, there is little scholarly agreement on a single interpretation of his life, or the methods needed to construct it. There are also overlapping attributes among the accounts and pairs of scholars which may differ on some attributes may agree on others. These groupings reflect the essential feature of each portrait and the accounts often include overlapping elements, for example there are a number of scholars, including Crossan and Wright, who are otherwise critical of each other, but whose interpretations agree that Jesus was not "primarily apocalyptic" and still believe that Jesus preached such a message, while others (e.g. Borg and Mack) differ on that issue. The third quest has thus witnessed a fragmentation of the scholarly interpretations in which no unified picture of Jesus can be attained at all.

In his 1906 book The Quest of the Historical Jesus, Albert Schweitzer noted the similarities of the portraits to the scholars who construct them and stated that they are often "pale reflections of the researchers" themselves. John Dominic Crossan stated that the trend has continued and summarized the situation by stating that many authors writing about the life of Jesus would "do autobiography and call it biography". More recent scholarship has challenged this view that reconstruction of Jesus has to be a self-portrait. For instance, James Crossley and Robert J. Myles argue that a rigorous and sober materialist approach can help counter anachronism and scholars' interest in talking about themselves when doing historical Jesus studies.

== Criticism ==
The historical analysis techniques used by Biblical scholars have been questioned, and according to James Dunn it is not possible "to construct (from the available data) a Jesus who will be the real Jesus." (Note: Merrigan, T. (2000). "The Historical Jesus in the Pluralist Theology of Religions". In Merrigan, T.; Haers, J. (eds.). The Myriad Christ: Plurality and the Quest for Unity in Contemporary Christology. ISBN 978-9-058-67009-0. & Charlesworth, J. H. (2014). Jesus research: New methodologies and perceptions: the second Princeton-Prague Symposium on Jesus Research, Princeton 2007. Wm. B. Eerdmans. pp. 77–78. ISBN 978-0-802-86728-5. "Dunn points out as well that 'the Enlightenment Ideal of historical objectivity also projected a false goal onto the quest for the historical Jesus,' which implied that there was a 'historical Jesus,' objectively verifiable, 'who will be different from the dogmatic Christ and the Jesus of the gospels and who will enable us to criticize the dogmatic Christ and the Jesus of the Gospels.'.") W.R. Herzog has stated that "What we call the historical Jesus is the composite of the recoverable bits and pieces of historical information and speculation about him that we assemble, construct, and reconstruct. For this reason, the historical Jesus is, in Meier's words, 'a modern abstraction and construct.'"

Bart Ehrman and separately Andreas Köstenberger contend that given the scarcity of historical sources, it is generally difficult for any scholar to construct a portrait of Jesus that can be considered historically valid beyond the basic elements of his life. On the other hand, scholars such as N. T. Wright and Luke Timothy Johnson argue that the image of Jesus presented in the gospels is largely accurate, and that dissenting scholars are simply too cautious about what we can claim to know about the ancient period.

=== Bias ===
Academic historians have looked at the social, historical, political, and ideological influences on scholarship. In different ways, William Arnal and James Crossley look at a range of factors behind the scholarly discourse about the "Jewishness" of Jesus and how scholars present their Jesus as "very Jewish", while implicitly continuing Christian and cultural supersessionism. Robert J. Myles has looked at how contemporary scholars claim Jesus was "subversive" while in actuality they bolster a non-subversive liberal view of him, similar to the phenomenon of the Hipster. Elisabeth Schüssler Fiorenza has shown how different forms of patriarchy have skewed the scholarly Jesus in the male image.

Bible scholar Clive Marsh has stated that construction of the portraits of Jesus has often been driven by various "specific agendas" and ideologies. He argues that historical components of the relevant biblical texts are often interpreted to fit specific goals. Marsh lists theological agendas that aim to confirm the divinity of Jesus, agendas that aim to discredit or disprove Christianity, and political agendas that aim to interpret the teachings of Jesus with the hope of causing social change. There are indeed divisions on worldviews among scholars that range from metaphysical naturalism to skepticism of naturalism. Maintaining neutrality on historical matters "is not a problem for only one kind of historian — for atheists or agnostics or Buddhists or Roman Catholics or Baptists or Jews or Muslims; it is a problem for all historians of every stripe."

John P. Meier, a Catholic priest and a professor of theology at the University of Notre Dame, has stated "... I think a lot of the confusion comes from the fact that people claim they are doing a quest for the historical Jesus when de facto they're doing theology, albeit a theology that is indeed historically informed ..." Meier also wrote that in the past the quest for the historical Jesus has often been motivated more by a desire to produce an alternate Christology than a true historical search. Some have argued that modern biblical scholarship can sometimes be insufficiently critical, and sometimes amounts to covert apologetics.

On the other side of the coin, historian Michael Licona says there is a "secular bias that ...often goes unrecognized to the extent such beliefs are ...considered to be undeniable truths." New Testament scholar Scot McKnight notes that bias is a universal criticism: "everyone tends to lean toward their own belief system" though historian Michael Grant notes that within life of Jesus studies the "notorious problem reaches its height." Licona adds that because "there is no such thing as an unbiased reader/author," and that every scholar of the historical Jesus "brings philosophical baggage," and because there are no "impartial historians," and "only the naive maintain that historians who are agnostics, atheists and non-Christian theists... [are] without any biases," this is a criticism inevitably accurate to varying degrees for everyone in the field. Stephen Porter says "We are all very biased observers, and given how biased we are, it is no wonder that our criteria so often give us what we want."

The New Testament scholar Nicholas Perrin has argued that since most biblical scholars are Christians, a certain bias is inevitable, but he does not see this as a major problem. Licona quotes N. T. Wright:

It must be asserted most strongly that to discover that a particular writer has a bias tells us nothing whatever of the value of the particular information he or she presents. It merely bids us be aware of the bias (and of our own for that matter), and to assess the material according to as many sources as we can."

However, there is a diversity of backgrounds among scholars, for example, the Society of Biblical Literature has 6,900 members and half is made up New Testament scholars composed of "liberals, conservatives, Christians, Muslims, Hindus, Buddhists, agnostics and atheists, all from numerous countries and ethnic groups from all over the world." And notable scholars have also been known to be converts to different worldviews, for example, from Christianity to Judaism, Christianity to atheism and agnosticism, and atheism to Christianity.

Historian Thomas L. Haskell explains, "even a polemicist, deeply and fixedly committed" can be objective "insofar as such a person successfully enters into the thinking of his or her rivals and produces arguments potentially compelling, not only to those who potentially share the same views, but to outsiders as well." This has led Licona to recognize 6 tools/methods used to check bias.

- Method—attention to method reduces bias
- Making point of view (horizon) and method public allows scrutiny of, and challenges to, that which stands behind the narrative
- Peer pressure—can act as a check, but can also hinder
- Submit work to the unsympathetic—they look for issues the sympathetic overlook
- Account for relevant historical bedrock—some facts are established
- Detachment from bias—historians must force themselves to confront all data

Amy-Jill Levine states that since numerous portraits of Jesus exist in scholarship, one should use the Gospels of Mark, Matthew, Luke and John as the starting point and basis on Jesus instead of the "gospels" according to modern scholars.

The past few decades of archaeological discoveries have increased corroboration of many mundane of details in the Gospel of John; indicating an independent historical core and making scholars question their biased treatment of John as just a theological text.

=== Lack of methodological soundness ===
A number of scholars have criticized the various approaches and techniques used in the study of the historical Jesus: the lack of rigor in research methods, and for being driven by "specific agendas" that interpret ancient sources to fit specific goals. New Testament scholar John Kloppenborg Verbin says the lack of uniformity in the application of the criteria, and the absence of agreement on methodological issues concerning them, have created challenges and problems. For example, the question of whether dissimilarity or multiple attestation should be given more weight has led some scholars exploring the historical Jesus to come up with "wildly divergent" portraits of him, which would be less likely to occur if the criteria were prioritized consistently. Methodological alternatives involving hermeneutics, linguistics, cultural studies and more, have been put forth by various scholars as alternatives to the criteria, but so far, the criteria remain the most common method used to measure historicity even though there is still no definitive criteriology.

Disagreements on the criteria of authenticity usually stem from observations that there are multiple portraits of Jesus instead of one generally agreed upon portrait in scholarship. Partly this comes from the assumption that the criteria are supposed to provide agreed upon results on who Jesus was. However, some scholars argue that the criteria are more like governing principles paralleling other fields that lack consensus such as ethics, law, and science, where disagreements do not mean the tools (e.g. criteria) are undermined. Also it is noted that scholars who disagree with the criteria such as Dale Allison use other methods to reach generally accepted events such as the baptism of Jesus and his teachings of divorce.

Historians such as David Fischer observe that though historians can agree in very general and basic principles, in practice "specific canons of historical proof are neither widely observed nor generally agreed upon". General historiographical texts on historical methods include sections on authenticity of sources using various criteria.

According to Licona, classicist historian A. N. Sherwin-White noted that approaches taken by biblical scholars differed from those of classical historians and that Sherwin-White expressed surprise at the loss of confidence in the Gospels and Acts among biblical scholars when classical historians have been growing in confidence in such ancient works. In particular, Sherwin-White says Roman historians take the basic historicity of Acts for granted. Licona observed that both biblical scholars and classical historians rarely reflect on or develop historical methods to grant historicity in their historical works and both commonly rely on their intuition, which is why there are a plurality of historical conclusions for historical inquiries on Jesus and also for historical inquiries that are completely unrelated to religion.

An interdisciplinary study tested the methodology of New Testament scholars and Greco-Roman historians on how they assessed the trial of Jesus and Julius Caesar crossing the Rubicon. The study concluded that general historians of Greco-Roman antiquity routinely employed criteria used by New Testament scholars such as multiple attestation, coherence, criteria of embarrassment and dissimilarity to the point that "It should be increasingly clear that the criteria of authenticity known to NT studies are not, in fact, unique to Jesus research". Scholars fall into 3 categories: critically accepts the criteria, critical but accepting with new or revised criteria, or marginalizes/rejects the criteria; and when reconstructing the trial of Jesus, every scholar (no matter their view on the criteria) ended up using things like multiple and independent attestation, general and historical coherence, embarrassment, and dissimilarity. Even modern Greco-Roman historians such as Michael Grant and Robin Lane Fox used these criteria when reconstructing the trial of Jesus.

Donald Akenson, Professor of Irish Studies in the department of history at Queen's University has argued that, with very few exceptions, the historians attempting to reconstruct a biography of the man Jesus of Nazareth apart from the mere facts of his existence and crucifixion have not followed sound historical practices. He has stated that there is an unhealthy reliance on consensus for propositions which should otherwise be based on primary sources, or rigorous interpretation. He also identifies a peculiar downward dating creep, and holds that some of the criteria being used are faulty.

Licona states that consensus can be valuable as a mark of objectivity when biblical scholars of diverse backgrounds agree on particular points, similar to how there is consensus on the Holocaust among both Jewish and non-Jewish scholars. Historian and philosopher Aviezer Tucker has argued that consensus on historiographic beliefs in uncoerced, heterogeneous, and notably sized group of scholars is indicative of good knowledge of history, similar to other fields such as the sciences. Dissenters from consensus historiographic beliefs tend to be homogenous and share common biases, for example, holocausts deniers tend to be Nazi sympathizers.

It is difficult for any scholar to construct a portrait of Jesus that can be considered historically valid beyond the basic elements of his life. As a result, W.R. Herzog has stated that: "What we call the historical Jesus is the composite of the recoverable bits and pieces of historical information and speculation about him that we assemble, construct, and reconstruct. For this reason, the historical Jesus is, in Meier's words, 'a modern abstraction and construct.'" According to James Dunn, "the historical Jesus is properly speaking a nineteenth and twentieth-century construction, not Jesus back then, and not a figure in history" (emphasis original). Dunn further explains "the facts are not to be identified as data; they are always an interpretation of the data. For example, scholars Chris Keith and Anthony Le Donne point out that under Bultmann and form criticism in the early and mid-twentieth century, Jesus was seen as historically "authentic" only where he was dissimilar from Judaism, whereas, in contemporary studies since the late twentieth, there is near unanimous agreement that Jesus must be understood within the context of first century Judaism. According to Dunn it is not possible "to construct (from the available data) a Jesus who will be the real Jesus."

Since Albert Schweitzer's book The Quest of the Historical Jesus, scholars have stated that many of the portraits of Jesus are "pale reflections of the researchers" themselves. Schweitzer stated: "There is no historical task which so reveals a man's true self as the writing of a life of Jesus." John Dominic Crossan summarized saying, many authors writing about the life of Jesus "do autobiography and call it biography." By way of contrast, James Crossley and Robert J. Myles argue that a rigorous and sober materialist approach can help counter anachronism and scholars' interest in talking about themselves when doing historical Jesus studies.

=== Scarcity of sources ===
There is no physical archaeological evidence for Jesus, and there are no writings by Jesus. First century Greek and Roman authors do not mention Jesus. Textual scholar Bart Ehrman writes that it is a myth that the Romans kept detailed records of everything, however, within a century of Jesus' death there are three extant Roman references to Jesus. While none of them were written during Jesus' lifetime, that is not unusual for personages from antiquity. Josephus, the first-century Romano-Jewish scholar, mentions Jesus twice. There are enough independent attestations of Jesus' existence, Ehrman says, it is "astounding for an ancient figure of any kind". While there are additional second and third century references to Jesus, evangelical philosopher and historian Gary Habermas says extra-biblical sources are of varied quality and dependability and can only provide a broad outline of the life of Jesus. He also points out that Christian non-New Testament sources, such as the church fathers, rely on the New Testament for much of their data and cannot therefore be considered as independent sources.

The primary sources on Jesus are the Gospels, therefore the Jesus of history is inextricably bound to the issue of the historical reliability of those writings. The authenticity and reliability of the gospels and the letters of the apostles have been questioned, and there are few events mentioned in the gospels that are universally accepted. However, Bart Ehrman says "To dismiss the Gospels from the historical record is neither fair nor scholarly." He adds: "There is historical information about Jesus in the Gospels." Representative of critical scholarship today are the comments of James Crossley and Robert J. Myles who "are sceptical about what we can know with confidence" and "prefer to think in terms of whether ideas about Jesus were early or late and whether they were particular to his geographical location or beyond."

== See also ==
- Christ myth theory
- Historical background of New Testament
- Historical Jesus
- Historicity of Jesus

== Sources ==
Printed sources

- Bernier, Jonathan (2016), The Quest for the Historical Jesus after the Demise of Authenticity: Toward a Critical Realist Philosophy of History in Jesus Studies, Bloomsbury Publishing
- Borg, Marcus J. (1994). Jesus in Contemporary Scholarship. Trinity Press. ISBN 1563380943.
- Burr, Kevin B. (2024). Authenticating Criteria in Jesus Research and Beyond: An Interdisciplinary Methodology. Brill. ISBN 9789004549012.</ref>
- Crossley, James (2015). Jesus and the Chaos of History. Oxford: Oxford University Press. ISBN 978-0-19-957057-7.
- Crossley, James; Myles, Robert J. (2023). Jesus: A Life in Class Conflict. Washington (US) and Winchester (UK): Zer0. ISBN 978-1-80341-082-1.
- Dunn, James D. G. (2003), Christianity in the Making, Volume 1: Jesus Remembered, Wm. B. Eerdmans Publishing, ISBN 978-0-8028-3931-2
- Durant, Will (1944). Caesar and Christ. New York: MJF Books. ISBN 978-1-56731-014-6.
- Ehrman, Bart D. (1999). Jesus: Apocalyptic Prophet of the New Millennium. New York: Oxford University Press. ISBN 978-0-19-512473-6.
- Ehrman, Bart D. (2011). Forged : writing in the name of God. Harper. ISBN 978-0-06-207863-6.
- Evans, Craig A. (2004), "The New Quest for Jesus and the New Research on the Dead Sea Scrolls", in Schmidt, Andreas (ed.), Jesus, Mark and Q, A&C Black
- Grant, Michael (1977). Jesus: An Historian's Review of the Gospels. New York: Macmillan. ISBN 978-0-68414-889-2.
- Hagner, Donald A. (2011), "The Jewish Quest and Jewish-Christian Relations", in Holmén, Tom; Porter, Stanley E. (eds.), Handbook for the Study of the Historical Jesus (4 Vols), Brill
- Holmén, Tom (2008). Evans, Craig A. (ed.). The Routledge Encyclopedia of the Historical Jesus. New York: Routledge. ISBN 978-0-415-97569-8.
- Keith, Chris; Le Donne, Anthony, eds. (2012), Jesus, Criteria, and the Demise of Authenticity, Bloomsbury Publishing
- Köstenberger, Andreas J.; Kellum, L. Scott; Quarles, Charles L (2009). The Cradle, the Cross, and the Crown: An introduction to the New Testament. Nashville, TN: B&H Academic. ISBN 978-0-8054-4365-3.
- Koester, Helmut (1995). Introduction to the New Testament: Volume 1 (2nd ed.). Berlin: Walter De Gruyter & Co. ISBN 978-3-11014-692-9.
- Licona, Michael R. (2010). The Resurrection of Jesus: A New Historiographical Approach. Downers Grove, Illinois: InterVarsity Press. ISBN 978-0-8308-2719-0.
- Meier, John P. (1991). A Marginal Jew: Rethinking the Historical Jesus, Volume 1: The Roots of the Problem and the Person. New York: Doubleday. ISBN 978-0-38526-425-9.
- Meier, John P. (1994). A Marginal Jew: Rethinking the Historical Jesus, Volume 2: Mentor, Message, and Miracles. New York: Doubleday. ISBN 978-0-38546-992-0.
- Meier, John P. (2001). A Marginal Jew: Rethinking the Historical Jesus, Volume 3: Companions and Competitors. New York: Doubleday. ISBN 978-0-300-14032-3.
- Meier, John P. (2009). A Marginal Jew: Rethinking the Historical Jesus, Volume 4: Law and Love. New Haven: Yale University Press. ISBN 978-0-300-14096-5.
- Porter, Stanley E. (2004). The Criteria for Authenticity in Historical-Jesus Research. New York: T&T Clark International. ISBN 978-0-56704-360-3.
- Powell, Mark Allan (1998). Jesus as a Figure in History: How Modern Historians View the Man from Galilee. Westminster John Knox Press. ISBN 0-664-25703-8.
- Reed, Jonathan L. (2002). Archaeology and the Galilean Jesus: a re-examination of the evidence. A&C Black. ISBN 1-56338-394-2.
- Shepherd, Michael B. (2018). "Semitic Wordplay behind the Greek of the New Testament". In Winstead, Melton Bennett (ed.). New Testament Philology: Essays in Honor of David Alan Black. Eugene, Oregon: Pickwick Publications. ISBN 978-1-4982-4487-9.
- Theissen, Gerd; Winter, Dagmar (2002). The Quest for the Plausible Jesus: The Question of Criteria. Louisville, Kentucky: Westminster John Knox Press. ISBN 978-0-664-22537-7.
- Van Eck, Ernest (2015), "Memory and historical Jesus studies: Formgeschichte in a new dress?", HTS Teologiese Studies/Theological Studies, 71 (1), Art. #2837
- Yeung, Maureen W. (2002). Faith in Jesus and Paul: A Comparison. Germany: Mohr Siebeck Pub. ISBN 978-3-16-147737-9.
