= Triumphal entry into Jerusalem =

Event in the Passion of Christ

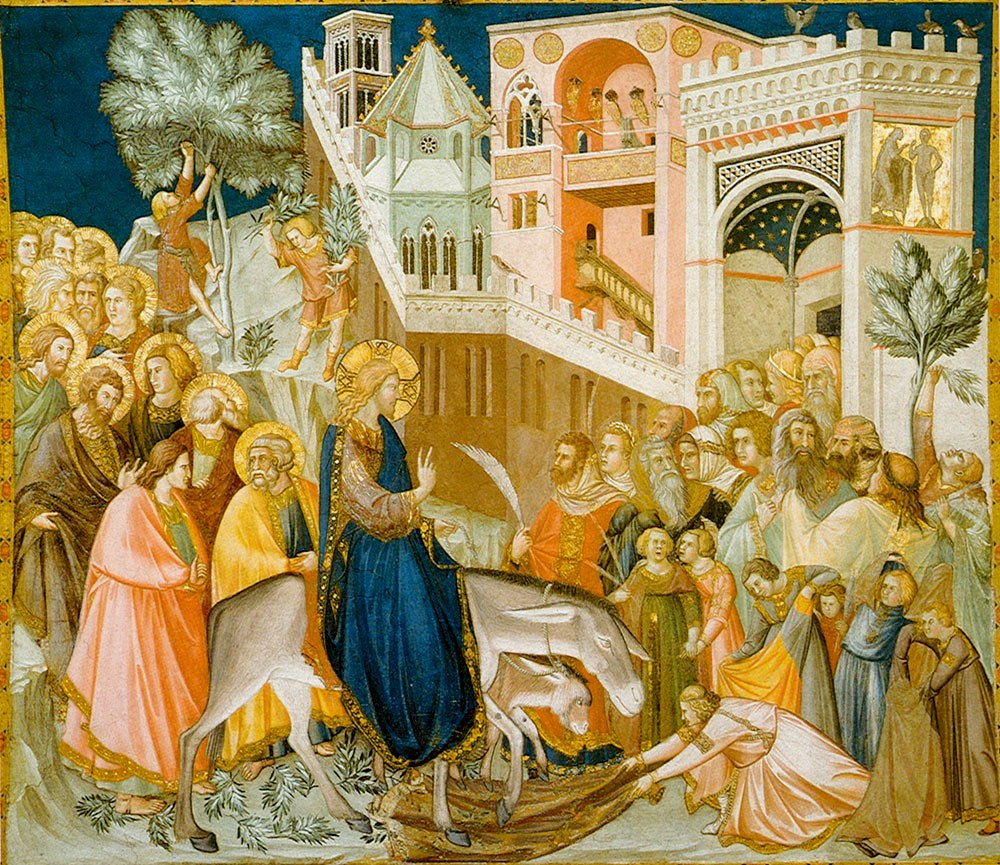
Entry of Christ into Jerusalem, Pietro Lorenzetti, Basilica of San Francesco d'Assisi

The triumphal entry into Jerusalem is a narrative in the four canonical Gospels describing the arrival of Jesus in Jerusalem a few days before his crucifixion. This event is celebrated each year by Christians on Palm Sunday.

According to the gospels, Jesus arrived in Jerusalem to celebrate Passover, entering the city riding a donkey. He was greeted by a crowd acclaiming him by waving palm branches and laying cloaks on the ground to honor him. This episode introduces the events of the Passion of Jesus, leading to his crucifixion and resurrection. The event is described in Matthew 21:1–11, Mark 11:1–11, Luke 19:28–44 and John 12:12–19.

== Gospel accounts ==
The triumphal entry of Jesus into Jerusalem is narrated in Matthew 21:1–11, Mark 11:1–11, Luke 19:28–44 and John 12:12–19. The following comparison is primarily based on the New International Version (NIV):

	Matthew	Mark	Luke	John
Disciples' task set by Jesus	Matthew 21:1–5: Jesus, the disciples and the crowd went to Bethphage from Jericho (20:29).; Jesus ordered two disciples: "In that village you'll find a donkey and her colt, untie them and bring them to me."; "Say that the Lord needs them."; Narrator claims this fulfilled a prophecy.	Mark 11:1–3: Jesus, the disciples and the crowd went to Bethphage and Bethany from Jericho (10:46).; Jesus ordered two disciples: "In that village you'll find a colt, untie it and bring it to me."; "Say that the Lord needs it and will return it shortly."	Luke 19:28–31: Jesus, the disciples and the crowd went to Bethphage and Bethany from Jericho (19:1–11).; Jesus ordered two disciples: "In that village you'll find a colt, untie it and bring it to me."; "Say that the Lord needs it."	John 12:12–13: Jesus and disciples went to Bethany (12:1) from Ephraim (11:54): no instructions for disciples; Crowd from Jerusalem went out to meet Jesus with palm branches: "Hosanna! Blessed is he who comes in the name of the Lord! Blessed is the king of Israel!"
Fetching the donkey(s)	Matthew 21:6–7: Two disciples fetched the donkey and colt.; [no reaction owners/bystanders]; two disciples brought donkey and colt to Jesus.; Jesus sat on both simultaneously.	Mark 11:4–7: Two disciples fetched the colt.; Bystanders: "Why?" Two disciples explained.; Two disciples brought colt to Jesus.; Jesus sat on the colt.	Luke 19:32–35: Two disciples fetched the colt.; Owners: "Why?" Two disciples: "The Lord needs it."; Two disciples brought colt to Jesus.; Jesus sat on the colt.	John 12:14–15: Jesus found a young donkey and sat on it.; [no reaction owners/bystanders]; Narrator claims this fulfilled a prophecy.
Entry and reaction	Matthew 21:8–11: Disciples and followers spread their cloaks on the road, or cut branches from trees and spread those on the road.; Disciples/followers: "Hosanna to the Son of David! Blessed is he who comes in the name of the Lord! Hosanna in the highest heaven!"; Jerusalem was stirred: "Who is this?"; Crowds: "This is Jesus, the prophet from Nazareth in Galilee."	Mark 11:8–11: Disciples and followers spread their cloaks on the road, or cut branches in the field and spread those on the road.; Disciples/followers: "Hosanna! Blessed is he who comes in the name of the Lord! Blessed is the coming kingdom of our father David! Hosanna in the highest heaven!"; Jesus entered the Temple and took a look around, but returned to Bethany because it was already late.	Luke 19:36–44: Disciples put their cloaks on the road and praised God.; Disciples: "Blessed is the king who comes in the name of the Lord! Peace in heaven and glory in the highest!"; Pharisees: "Teacher, rebuke your disciples!"; Jesus: "If they keep quiet, the stones will cry out."; Jesus wept and predicted the destruction of Jerusalem.	John 12:16–19: The disciples did not understand why Jesus was welcomed with these words, but remembered after his death, concluding this was a prophecy that had been fulfilled.; The witnesses of Jesus' raising of Lazarus had told others about it.; Pharisees told each other: "This is getting us nowhere. Look how the whole world has gone after Jesus!"

== Historical context ==
All Jewish males are obliged to ascend to Jerusalem for the three pilgrimage festivals. The sabbath prior to Passover is called the Great Sabbath in Judaism, and it is when each household or community sets apart a Passover lamb.

Passover celebrates God's deliverance of Israel from bondage in Egypt. By the early post-exilic period, according to Robin Routledge, celebration of Passover had become a "pilgrim feast, centered on the Jerusalem temple."

== Scholarly interpretation ==
There is a general agreement among scholars that Jesus did enter Jerusalem and was acclaimed by his supporters. (Note: However, according to Agnostic scholar Bart D. Ehrman, there are several reasons why it is improbable that the entry happened in such a triumphal and glorious way as transmitted by the canonical gospels, and some elements may have been invented for theological purposes.)

All four canonical Gospels contain an account of the triumphal entry, which according to Ehrman, passes the criterion of multiple attestation in order to (re)construct the historical Jesus. As ancient histories and biographies could display flexibility when reporting events, each gospel tells separate accounts with differences while lining up with the writing practices of antiquity.

=== The crowd and geography ===
==== Synoptic Gospels ====
According to the preceding narratives in the Synoptic Gospels (Matthew 20:29; Mark 10:46, and Luke 18:35–36), an ever-growing crowd of people had been following Jesus and his Twelve Disciples by the time they departed from Jericho, where Jesus healed one or two blind men who also joined the crowd, and set out on their way to Jerusalem via Bethphage and Bethany on the Mount of Olives. Osborne 2010, p. 747 stated that Jericho was traditionally a place for pilgrims to cross the Jordan River on the way to the Passover festival in Jerusalem, so the presence of many people travelling in the same direction would have been 'natural', but the texts (e.g., Matthew 20:29) specifically say that a large crowd was following Jesus, "undoubtedly as a result of his fame in Galilee". After Jesus mounted (a) donkey(s), these people accompanying Jesus started shouting "Hosanna!" and prophecy-related statements (according to Luke 19:37 upon passing the Mount of Olives).

==== Gospel of John ====
The Gospel of John never mentions Jericho, but has Jesus and the Twelve flee to Ephraim in the wilderness to keep out of sight of the priests after the upheaval caused by the Raising of Lazarus (John 11:46–57). Six days before Passover, Jesus and the Twelve depart from Ephraim to visit Lazarus, Mary and Martha in Bethany (John 12:1–3), where a large crowd gathered when they found out Jesus and Lazarus were there (12:9). However, verses 12:12–13 seem to indicate they went home again the same day after this brief encounter in Bethany. "The great crowd", apparently the same people, is said to come out of Jerusalem again the next day to meet and greet Jesus and the Twelve, and these Jerusalemian crowds are the ones shouting "Hosanna!" and that a prophecy has been fulfilled (instead of the people accompanying Jesus from Jericho according to the Synoptics) according to John 12:12–15. John 12:16 states that the disciples do not understand why the Jerusalemians are shouting these things, while in Matthew, Mark and especially Luke they appear to be participating in this shouting themselves, presumably aware of the words' meaning. Verse 18 repeats the claim that "the crowd went out to meet Him" (rather than a crowd already following Jesus), and connects it to the Raising of Lazarus, which is not narrated by the other Gospels.

==== Scholarly analysis on the crowd ====
The number of people who attended the event is a source of debate among historians: Marcus Borg, Tan Kim Huat, Brent Kinman, and Paula Fredriksen argue that Jesus's entry was cheered by a crowd of followers and sympathizers. E. P. Sanders writes that Jesus was greeted with shouts of hosannas only from a small group of disciples.

Osborne 2010, pp. 755–756, argued that the crowd accompanying Jesus to Jerusalem (e.g., in Matthew 21:8–9) was a mixture of pilgrims who had been following Jesus around from Galilee, and 'pilgrims (many coming out of Jerusalem after hearing Jesus was coming, John 12:12).'

=== The donkey(s) ===
In the synoptic gospels, Jesus sends two disciples ahead to the nearby village of Bethphage in order to retrieve a donkey and if questioned, to say that it was needed by the Lord. Marcus Borg and John Dominic Crossan characterize this as a pre-planned "counterprocession" in contrast to that of the Roman prefect who would have traveled with his troops from Caesarea Maritima to maintain order during the festival. Professor John Bergsma says that this is widely seen as a "recapitulation" of the enthronement of Solomon, (described in 1 Kings:1) where, at David's direction, he is anointed at the Gihon Spring and rides his father's donkey into the city to the acclaim of the people.

Jesus then rode the donkey into Jerusalem, with the three synoptic gospels stating that the disciples had first put their cloaks on it. Matthew 21:7 maintains that the disciples laid their cloaks on both the donkey and its colt. Protestant theologian Heinrich Meyer suggests that "they spread their outer garments upon both animals, being uncertain which of them Jesus intended to mount". Matthew is the only one of the Synoptics to mention two animals. According to the New American Bible, this reflects Matthew's understanding of that section in the Old Testament Book of Zechariah 9:9 which he cites, and does not take into account "...the common Hebrew literary device of poetic parallelism", mentioning the same animal twice in different ways. Bart D. Ehrman agreed that the Gospel of Matthew misunderstood Zechariah 9:9, which states "[Your king comes] riding on a donkey, on a colt, the foal of a donkey." This repetition is a Hebrew poetic figure of speech which says the same thing twice in different words, but Matthew accidentally turned this into two separate animals which Jesus rode simultaneously instead of one donkey which is described twice. John 12:14–15 refers to the same passage in Zechariah 9:9, but in his case there is only talk of one donkey.

According to Stephen Carlson Matthew did not mistakenly say Jesus mounted two animals, a jenny and a colt. In Carlson's opinion Matthew understood the presence of the jenny as a fulfillment of Zechariah's characterization of the colt as a "son of jennies". He also argues that the plural pronoun functions for Matthew as a whole-for-part synecdoche, where the jenny and the colt constitute a conceptual whole such that when Jesus sits on top of "them", he takes his mount on the colt and alongside his mother jenny enters into Jerusalem in order to fulfill the Hebrew prophecy.

Ehrman argued that the triumphal entry did not pass the criterion of dissimilarity, because the king entering Jerusalem on a donkey could have been invented by Christians in order to have Jesus fulfil Old Testament prophecy. The fact that Matthew mistakenly turned Zechariah 9:9 into two animals to literally fulfil this prophecy underlines this theological motive, and questions whether Matthew wanted to give a historically reliable account. Maurice Casey disagrees and states that the similarity of the event with Zechariah is not sufficient to rule out the historicity of the event and notes that only Matthew mentions a colt (probably attempting to literally fulfill Zechariah's prophecy), while Mark and Luke simply speak of an ass.

=== The shouting ===
The crowd is said to be shouting various prophecy-related statements that are somewhat different in each Gospel. The shout hosanna (mentioned by all Gospels except Luke) derives from Hebrew hosia-na, meaning "save us", "save, we pray", or "save now". The one shout all four Gospels agree on is "Blessed is he who comes in the name of the Lord!" (although Luke replaces "He" with "the King"), which is a quote from Psalm 118:25,26; Matthew 23:39 and Luke 13:35 also recite this verse. Psalm 118 is part of the traditional festive Hallel, sung each morning by the temple choir during the Feast of Tabernacles, so every Jew would have known this phrase.

In Matthew and Mark, the crowd claims that Jesus will soon ascend to the kingship as the 'son' (descendant) of King David. Edward Schillebeeckx (1974) stated that Matthew and Mark thus emphasised the claim that Jesus had a hereditary right to the throne of Israel. In Luke and John, the crowd explicitly claims that Jesus is the king of Israel already, without any reference to David. According to Huffman 2012, pp. 10, Luke portrayed Jesus' coming kingdom as spiritual, seeking 'peace in heaven', rather than a political threat to the Roman Empire.

=== The cloak- and branch-spreading ===
The gospels (for example, Matthew 21:8) go on to recount how Jesus rode into Jerusalem, and how the people there laid down their cloaks in front of him (except in John) and also laid down small branches of trees. Huffman 2012, pp. 12 noted: "Luke does not mention (nor deny) tree branches, but only John specifies branches of palm trees (John 12:13)."

=== Flevit super illam ===
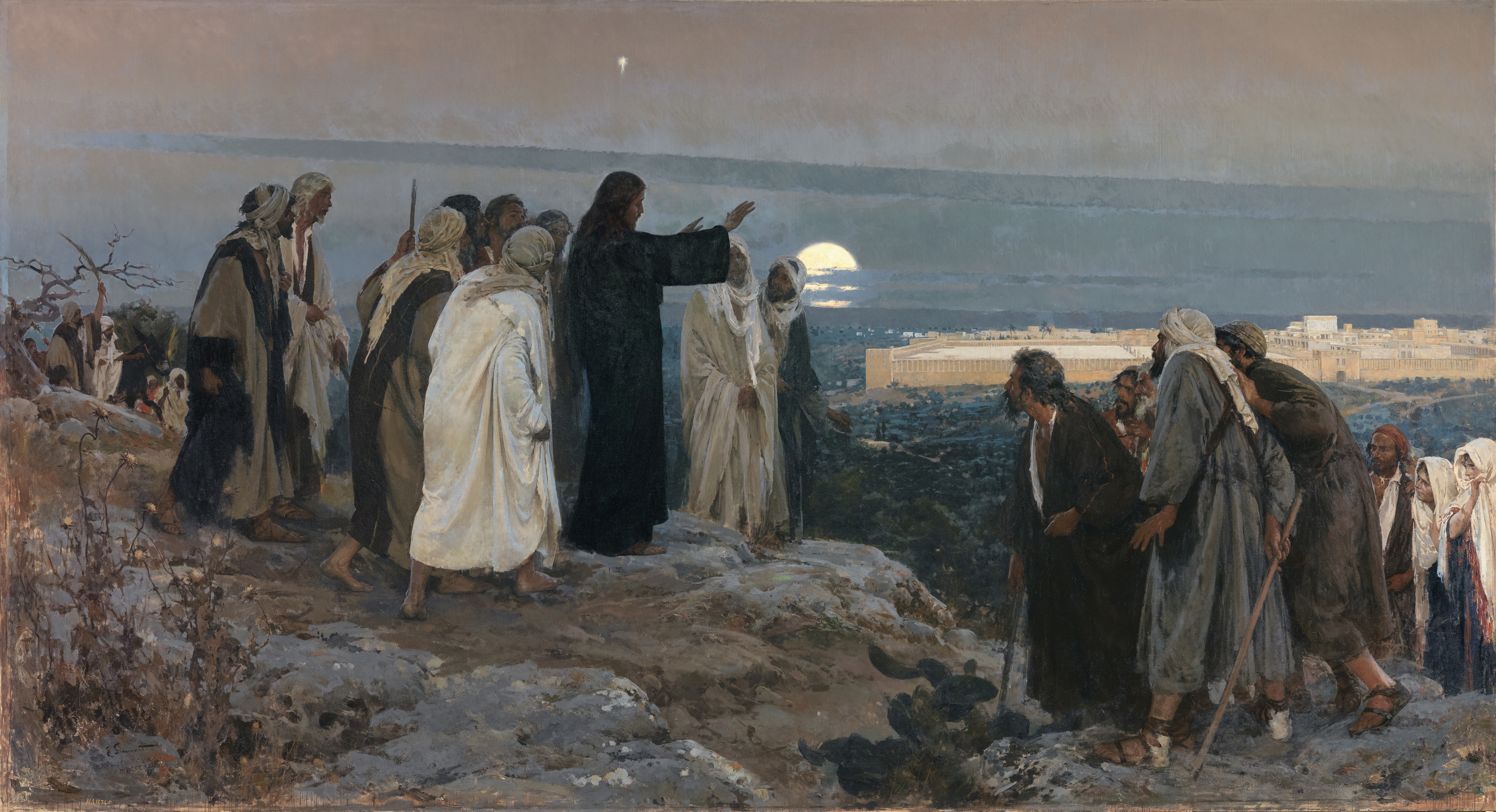
Flevit super illam (1892) by Enrique Simonet

In Luke 19:41, as Jesus approaches Jerusalem, he looks at the city and weeps over it (an event known as Flevit super illam in Latin), foretelling the suffering that awaits the city.

=== The reactions ===
On his entry into the city, Matthew's account suggests that Jesus evoked great excitement – "all the city was moved". The people of the city asked "Who is this?" and "the multitudes" answered, "This is Jesus, the prophet from Nazareth of Galilee".

In Jesus and Judaism (1985), E. P. Sanders asked: "If the entry was what we are told it was, why did it take so long for the Romans to execute Jesus?" A large-scale event as portrayed in the Gospels, in which Jesus is loudly proclaimed to be the (future) king of Israel, would have been an act of rebellion that the Romans would surely have punished with immediate execution, Sanders reasoned, suggesting it may have been much smaller and humbler than narrated to avoid Roman interference. Following Sanders, Ehrman argued that the triumphal entry did not pass the criterion of contextual credibility: "If Jesus actually did enter into the city with such fanfare, with crowds shouting their support for Him as the new ruler of the Jews, the king who fulfils all prophecies – who would therefore have to overthrow the present ruler and his armies in order for Himself to rule – it's nearly impossible to understand why the authorities didn't have Him arrested on the spot and immediately taken away, if this really happened."

Other scholars are less skeptical: Adela Yarbro Collins underlines that Jesus's entry into Jerusalem was neither a tumult or an organized demonstration, as Jesus had spontaneously entered Jerusalem in the midst of thousands of pilgrims, some of whom had voluntarily started praising Him. Maurice Casey argues that Roman inaction was due to the fact that Jesus's entry was actually overshadowed by Pontius Pilate's entry into Jerusalem on the same day, which was actually much more triumphal than Jesus's one.

Some point out that it would have been unwise for the Romans to launch an attack in the city during the Passover period to arrest a single man: Pilate's approximately 1,000 soldiers would not have been sufficient against the tens (or hundreds) of thousands of Jewish pilgrims in a mood of nationalistic and religious zeal; Josephus himself writes that during the pilgrimage festivals there was a considerable potential for revolts to arise because these feasts inspired hopes of redemption among the Jews. Jesus was popular among the crowds, as He inspired eschatological hopes: immediate and aggressive intervention in the wrong place and at the wrong time – amidst Passover-enthusiastic pilgrims – could have caused a revolt and the deaths of thousands of people, as it happened during the reign of Herod Archelaus in 4 AD.

Brent Kinman also argues that the Romans may not have noted Jesus's entry at all: the entrance took place on the Mount of Olives, outside the city, while Roman troops were at the Antonia Fortress, about 300 meters away: it is unlikely that the legionaries were able to see, hear and understand what was happening on the Mount of Olives in the midst of the huge crowd of pilgrims.

According to Maurice Casey, the Jewish authorities did not immediately put Jesus under arrest for fear of unleashing a tumult, as underlined in the Gospels. This, of course, does not mean that the act was without consequences: Jesus was in fact arrested a few days later by the Jewish authorities and among the accusations brought against Him there was also that of having proclaimed Himself "King of the Jews" and of having incited a revolt. Paula Fredriksen underlines that "the entry and the execution fit each other precisely: Jesus parades into the city before Passover like a king (Mark 11:7–10); and He is executed by Pilate as if He had, indeed, claimed to be one (Mark 15:2–26)".

== Religious significance ==
=== King of peace ===
Bethany was located east of Jerusalem on the Mount of Olives. Zechariah 14:4 states that the Messiah would come to Jerusalem from the Mount of Olives:

Matthew 21:1–11 refers to a passage from Book of Zechariah and states: "All this was done, that it might be fulfilled which was spoken by the prophet, saying, Tell ye the daughter of Sion, Behold, thy King cometh unto thee, meek, and sitting upon an ass, and a colt the foal of an ass."

Though Jesus had been to Jerusalem several times to celebrate the three pilgrimage festivals, his final entry into Jerusalem had a special meaning. He was solemnly entering as a humble King of peace. Traditionally, entering the city on a donkey symbolizes arrival in peace, rather than as a war-waging king arriving on a horse. Twentieth-century British scholar William Neil stated, "Our Lord enacts his first messianic symbol by entering Jerusalem on the back of a donkey. This, as Zechariah had depicted, was the means by which Messiah when he came would enter Zion, not as a conqueror upon a warhorse but as the prince of peace upon a humble beast of burden."

N. T. Wright has said, "Within his own time and culture, [Jesus] riding on a donkey over the Mount of Olives, across Kidron, and up to the Temple mount spoke more powerfully than words could have done of a royal claim. The allusion to Zechariah is obvious. ... The so-called 'triumphal entry' was thus clearly messianic."

The Golden Gate is located in the north section of the east wall of the Temple Mount. In Jewish belief, the gate is called 'The Gate of Mercy' (Sha'ar HaRakhamim), and is considered to be the place from which the Messiah will enter in the end of days. According to Jewish tradition, the Shekhinah (שכינה) (Divine Presence) used to appear through the eastern Gate, and will appear again when the Anointed One (Messiah) comes (Ezekiel 44:1–3) The gate is believed to be the place from which Christ entered Jerusalem on Palm Sunday, thus implying his own messianic status.

=== Sacrificial lamb ===
The New Testament says that Jesus traveled by way of Bethphage. Usually the paschal lamb was brought from Bethphage and led to the Temple Mount.

=== Old Testament parallels ===
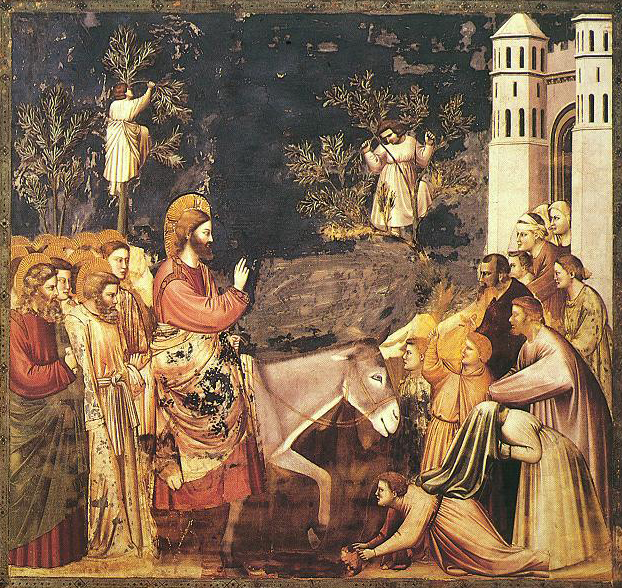
Entry into Jerusalem, by Giotto, 14th century

Frederic Farrar notes that a colt "on which no one has ever sat" (Luke 19:30) is "therefore adapted for a sacred use", recalling Numbers 19:2 (a red heifer without blemish, in which there is no defect and on which a yoke has never come), Deuteronomy 21:3 and 1 Samuel 6:7. The prophecy referred to by Matthew recalls Zechariah 9:9 ("Exult greatly, O daughter Zion! Shout for joy, O daughter Jerusalem! Behold: your king is coming to you, a just savior is he, Humble, and riding on a donkey, on a colt, the foal of a donkey.")

At the proclamation of Jehu as King of Israel in 2 Kings 9:11–13, "in haste every man of them took his garment and put it under him on the bare steps, and they blew the trumpet and proclaimed, "Jehu is king". The triumphal entry and the use of palm branches resemble the celebration of Jewish liberation in 1 Maccabees 13:51, which states: "And entered into it ... with thanksgiving, and branches of palm trees, and with harps, and cymbals, and with viols, and hymns, and songs."

=== Christian writers ===
John Chrysostom commented that Jesus "had so often gone up to Jerusalem, [but] He never however had done so in such a conspicuous manner as now. 17th-century French bishop Jacques-Bénigne Bossuet called this episode the "humble entry ... into Jerusalem".

== See also ==
- Life of Jesus in the New Testament
- Entry of Christ into Jerusalem (1617)
- Christ's Entry Into Brussels in 1889 (1888)
