= Triumphal Entry =

A triumphal entry is a ceremonial entry by a person, often into a city.

- Roman triumph, awarded to successful generals in Ancient Rome
- Triumphal entry into Jerusalem by Jesus Christ, commemorated on Palm Sunday

== See also ==
- Royal Entry, for European ceremonies from the Middle Ages onward
- Triumphal arch, a monumental structure
