= Criterion of dissimilarity =

Principle of higher biblical criticism

The criterion of dissimilarity (often used as a shorthand for criterion of double dissimilarity; it is also called criterion of discontinuity, originality or dual irreducibility) is used in Biblical criticism to determine if a statement attributed to Jesus may be authentic. The criterion states that if a saying attributed to Jesus is different from both the Jewish traditions of his time and the early Church that followed him, it is likely to come from the historical Jesus.

== Description ==
Although early forms of the criterion of dissimilarity date back to the Renaissance, its modern formulation comes from Ernst Käsemann, who in 1953 started the second quest for the historical Jesus.

Käsemann writes:

[T]here is an almost complete lack of satisfactory and water-tight criteria for this material. In only one case do we have more or less safe ground under our feet: when there are no grounds either for deriving a tradition from Judaism or for ascribing it to primitive Christianity, and especially when Jewish Christianity has mitigated or modified the received tradition, as having been too bold for its taste. (Käsemann, Essays on New Testament Themes, p. 37)

In other words, the criterion postulates that traditions about Jesus derive from (only) three sources: extrapolation from earlier Jewish traditions, revisionism by the early Christian Church, and true historical accounts of Jesus's ministry. If some tradition cannot be adequately explained by extrapolation nor by revisionism, then it can (or must) be a trace of the historical Jesus. Aside from Käsemann, his teacher Rudolf Bultmann and Norman Perrin were also major proponents of the criterion of dissimilarity. John P. Meier (1991) stated that the criterion of dissimilarity is "closely allied to the criterion of embarrassment", but unlike Polkow (1987), he did not think the two criteria completely overlap.

Bart D. Ehrman (1999) gave a somewhat different description of how the criterion of dissimilarity is supposed to work: it must be determined whether "there is at least a theoretical possibility that these sayings and deeds were made up precisely in order to advance the views that some Christians held dear," or whether they are "'dissimilar' traditions, that is, those that do not support a clear Christian agenda, or that appear to work against it". Because the latter "are difficult to explain unless they are authentic, they are therefore more likely to be historical."

== Examples of its use ==
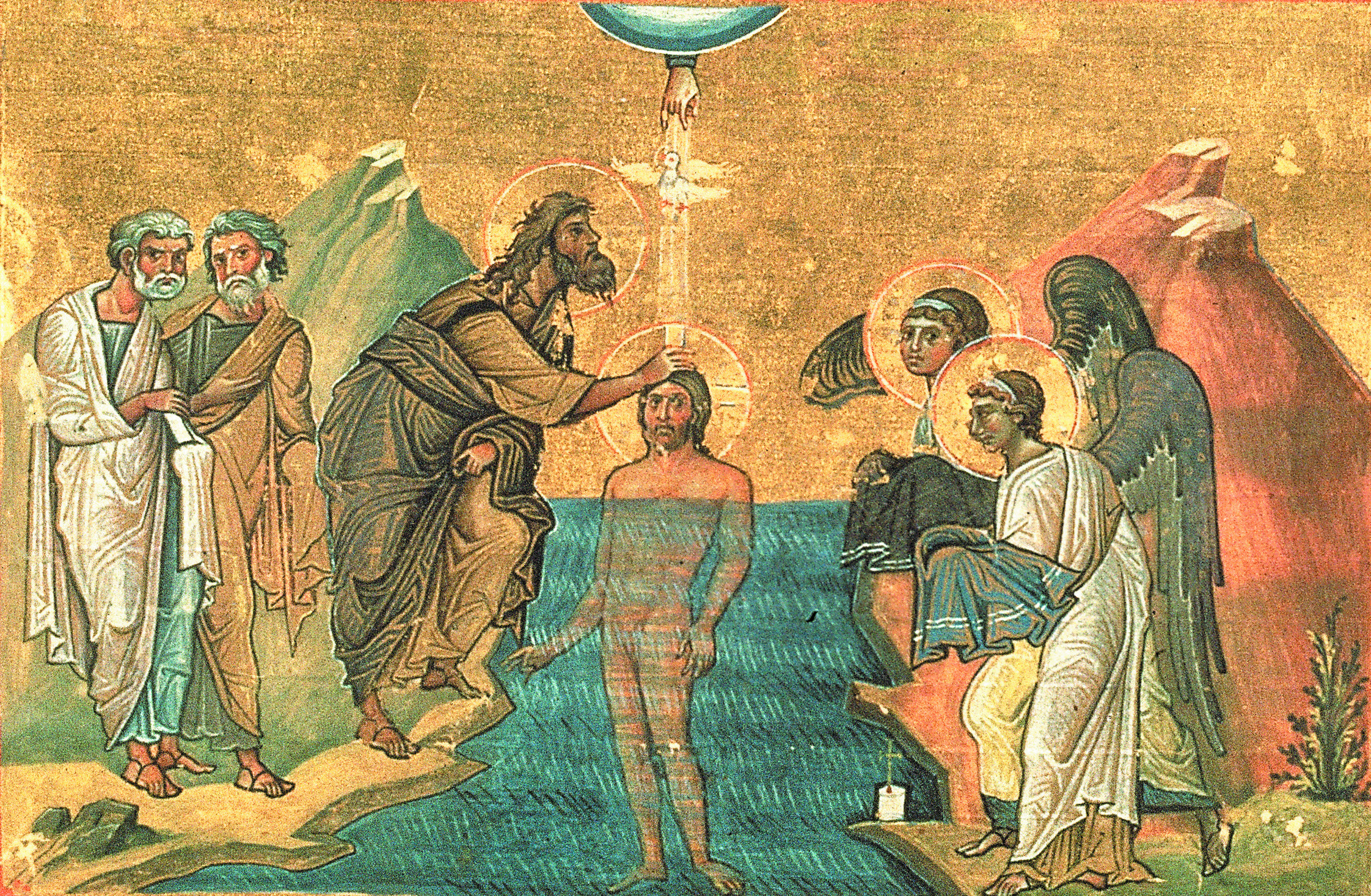
Baptism of Jesus (Menologion of Basil II, c. 1100). The general traditions of John the Baptist baptising Jesus pass the criterion of dissimilarity, but suggestions by John that Jesus should baptise him instead (Matthew 3:14) or that Jesus was confessing "the sins of the world" rather than his own (John 1:29) do not.

Scholars generally agree that the baptism of Jesus is an example of a tradition that passes the criterion of dissimilarity, because most early Christians appear to have believed "that a person who was baptized was spiritually inferior to the one who was doing the baptizing." It is unlikely that early Christians would have regarded Jesus as spiritually inferior to John the Baptist, and so they probably would not have invented this story. In fact, Matthew 3:14 records a tradition that has John the Baptist protesting against Jesus' request to be baptised, saying that Jesus should baptise him instead. Scholars regard this as potential evidence of early Christians' apparent embarrassment that John baptised Jesus and not vice versa; therefore, Matthew 3:14 cannot pass the criterion of dissimilarity, but the rest of the baptism narrative can. Gerd Theissen and Dagmar Winter (2002) added that early Christians believed that people who underwent baptism confessed to sin, which posed a problem, because the story that Jesus was baptised – and thus presumably had sinned as well – was incompatible with early Christian views of Jesus as a divine being. Theissen and Winter therefore regarded the tradition of John 1:29 as claiming that Jesus was coming to be baptised "to take away the sins of the world", not his own, as an early Christian modification of the tradition that could not be historically authentic.

The crucifixion of Jesus passes the criterion of dissimilarity on the grounds that it appears that although there was a wide range of beliefs about what the Messiah was going to be like, no Jews at the time believed that the Messiah would suffer and die. The apostle Paul stated in 1 Corinthians 1:23 that the crucifixion of Christ (=Messiah) was "a stumbling block to Jews", who apparently did not believe that the Messiah was going to be crucified, concluded that Jesus could not have been the Messiah and thus refused to convert to Christianity. On the other hand, Ehrman claimed that it follows that even Jesus himself may not have known or believed that he would be crucified, and so the Synoptic traditions of Jesus predicting his own death by crucifixion in Jerusalem do not pass the criterion of dissimilarity. He emphasised that this does not mean that Jesus definitely did not predict his death, just that the authenticity of the saying cannot be established through this criterion. Likewise, Bellinzoni argued that the words "take up their cross" in Mark 8:34 failed the criterion of dissimilarity, because they reflect the early church's beliefs about the meaning of the crucifixion, and may thus represent an interpolation, perhaps inserted into the tradition before the author of the Gospel of Mark wrote it down.

Ehrman attributed the traditions of the young Jesus raising children from the dead or magically solving issues in the carpenter workshop of Joseph as recorded in the Infancy Gospel of Thomas to "later Christian imagination".

== Limitations ==
The criterion has received criticism for leading to reconstructions of the historical Jesus as being in implausible discontinuity with the early Jewish traditions that preceded him and the early Christian traditions that followed from him. One objection by Morna Hooker is that the criterion requires full knowledge of 1st-century Jewish and Christian beliefs, which scholars do not have, and therefore it is difficult to compare them with the traditions of Jesus for this criterion to work. Oegema pointed out that increasing knowledge poses a new issue:

The problem of the Criterion of Double Dissimilarity is that the more we know about early Jewish traditions and the more we know about early Christian post-Easter traditions, the less space there is for a reconstruction of the authentic sayings of Jesus, as by definition they have to differ from early Jewish and early Christian traditions. Therefore, in the end, no trace of a historical Jesus remains.

Meier concluded that the original definition of the criterion (by Käsemann) of a wholly-non-Jewish and wholly-non-Christian Jesus was too stringent and needed to be relaxed:

To paint a portrait of Jesus completely divorced from or opposed to 1st-century Judaism and Christianity is simply to place him outside of history. (...) Hence, while the criterion of discontinuity is useful, we must guard against the presupposition that it will automatically give us what was central to or at least fairly representative of Jesus' teaching. By focusing narrowly upon what may have been Jesus' "idiosyncrasies", it is always in danger of highlighting what was striking but possibly peripheral in his message.

Therefore, it needed to be balanced by other criteria of authenticity. Ehrman emphasised the possibility of continuity between teachings of Jesus and early Christian beliefs:

Just because a saying or deed of Jesus happens to conform to what Christians were saying about him does not mean that it cannot be accurate. Obviously, the earliest disciples followed Jesus precisely because they appreciated the things that he said and did. (...) the criterion may do no more than cast a shadow of doubt on certain traditions.

It is therefore "best used not in the negative way of establishing what Jesus did not say or do, but in the positive way of showing what he likely did."

== See also ==
- Criterion of contextual credibility
- Criterion of embarrassment
- Criterion of multiple attestation

== Literature ==
- Ehrman, Bart D. (1999). Jesus: Apocalyptic Prophet of the New Millennium. New York: Oxford University Press. ISBN 978-0-19-512473-6.
- Meier, John P. (2005). "Criteria: How do we decide what comes from Jesus?". In Dunn, James D. G.; McKnight, Scot (eds.). The Historical Jesus in Recent Research. Winona Lake, Indiana: Eisenbrauns. p. 129–132. ISBN 1575061007.
- Theissen, Gerd; Winter, Dagmar (2002). The Quest for the Plausible Jesus: The Question of Criteria. London: Westminster John Knox Press. ISBN 9780664225377. (original German title: Die Kriterienfrage in der Jesusforschung.)
- Porter, Stanley E. (2004). The Criteria for Authenticity in Historical-Jesus Research. New York: T&T Clark International. ISBN 978-0-56704-360-3.
