= John P. Meier =

American biblical scholar, Catholic priest (1942–2022)

The Reverend Dr. Monsignor John Paul Meier Honorary Prelate
- Church: Honorary Prelate of the Papal Household by Pope John Paul II in 1994

Orders
- Ordination: 1967 in Saint Peter's Basilica, Rome

Personal details
- Born: August 8, 1942 New York City, U.S.
- Died: October 18, 2022 (aged 80) South Bend, Indiana, U.S.
- Denomination: Catholic Church
- Residence: University of Notre Dame, Indiana, U.S.
- Occupation: Priest, Professor of Theology at the University of Notre Dame, Biblical Studies, author of A Marginal Jew: Rethinking the Historical Jesus (5 vols.)
- Education: St. Joseph's Seminary and College (B.A.); Pontifical Gregorian University (S.T.L.); Pontifical Biblical Institute (S.S.D.)

John Paul Meier (August 8, 1942 – October 18, 2022) was an American biblical scholar and Catholic priest. He was author of the series A Marginal Jew: Rethinking the Historical Jesus (5 v.), six other books, and more than 70 articles for peer-reviewed or solicited journals or books.

Meier was widely regarded as one of the leading scholars of the historical Jesus and early Christianity during his life. His book Antioch and Rome: New Testament Cradles of Catholic Christianity (which he co-authored with fellow Catholic scholar Raymond E. Brown) is considered by many scholars a seminal work about early Christianity, while his multi-volume work A Marginal Jew: Rethinking the Historical Jesus is hailed as Meier's magnum opus.

== Life and career ==
Meier was born in New York City. He attended St. Joseph's Seminary and College (B.A., Philosophy, 1964), Dunwoodie, Yonkers, New York, Gregorian University, Rome; (S.T.L., 1968), and the Biblical Institute, Rome (S.S.D., 1976). Meier was William K. Warren Professor of Theology, Emeritus, at the University of Notre Dame, Indiana. His fields included biblical studies and Christianity and Judaism in antiquity.

Before the appointment to Notre Dame in 1999, he taught at St. Joseph Seminary, Dunwoodie, for 12 years and was professor of New Testament at the Catholic University of America for 14 years. Meier was ordained a Roman Catholic priest at the Altar of the chair in St. Peter's Basilica, Rome, in 1967, and was made an Honorary Prelate of the Papal Household (Monsignor) by Pope John Paul II in 1994. In retirement, Meier continued to offer courses at Notre Dame. He was working on a prospective volume 6 of the series A Marginal Jew at the time of his death.

Meier died in South Bend, Indiana on October 18, 2022, aged 80, leaving his 6th volume unfinished. His funeral took place at the chapel of St. Joseph's Seminary and College and was presided by Cardinal Timothy M. Dolan. His personal research library and papers were donated to St. Joseph's Seminary and College.

== Antioch and Rome: New Testament Cradles of Catholic Christianity ==
Antioch and Rome is a co-work of Meier and his fellow Catholic scholar Raymond E. Brown analyses the history and development of early Christianity in the cities of Antioch and Rome, using a vast array of both Christian and Pagan sources.

== A Marginal Jew: Rethinking the Historical Jesus ==
John P. Meier's series A Marginal Jew: Rethinking the Historical Jesus begins by invoking the methods of modern historical research to "recover, recapture, or reconstruct" the "historical Jesus." Meier suggests that such research might admit agreement of Catholic, Protestant, Jewish, and agnostic scholars as to "who Jesus of Nazareth was and what he intended" (v. 1, 1991, p. 1).

=== Volume 1 ===
- Volume 1 (1991) differentiates the historical Jesus from the Christ of faith. It analyzes sources, including the New Testament and non-canonical works. The latter include the agrapha, the apocryphal gospels (such as the Gospel of Thomas), Josephus, Philo, Justus of Tiberias and other Jewish and second-century Roman works. For deciding what comes from Jesus as distinct from early Christian tradition it proposes these primary criteria (pp. 168–77):

1. The criterion of embarrassment: Why invent what would invite difficulty for the early church?
2. The criterion of discontinuity: Why reject as words or deeds of Jesus what cannot be derived from the Judaism of Jesus' time or the early church?
3. The criterion of multiple attestation: Is it more plausible to deny words, sayings, or deeds attributed to Jesus in more than one independent literary source (e.g., Mark, Q, Paul, and John) or literary genre (e.g., parable, miracle story, or prophecy)?
4. The criterion of coherence: Given the claims to historicity from any of the above criteria, are different sayings or deeds evidently inconsistent?
5. The criterion of rejection and execution: If Jesus' ministry came to a violent, public end, what of Jesus' words or deeds could have alienated people, especially powerful people?

The criteria are to be used in concert for mutual correction. Still, any claim is only to the probable, not the certain. The rest of Volume 1 discusses the origins of Jesus as to formative years, "external" influences (language, education, and socioeconomic status), and "internal" influences (family ties and marital and lay status). The volume concludes with a survey of Jesus' life chronology.

On the question of references to Jesus in the Talmud, Meier considers the thesis of Joseph Klausner (1925) that some very few rabbinic sources, none earlier than about the late 2nd or early 3rd century, contain traces of the historical Jesus. He presents further considerations and arguments, including those of Johann Maier (1978) who maintains that the Yeshu texts are later medieval corruptions, and writes that:

While not accepting the full, radical approach of Maier, I think we can agree with him on one basic point: in the earliest rabbinic sources, there is no clear or even probable reference to Jesus of Nazareth. Furthermore, ... when we do finally find such references in later rabbinic literature, they are most probably reactions to Christian claims, oral or written.

On the other hand, Meier accepts the partial authenticity of the Testimonium Flavianum by Josephus in the Antiquities of the Jews, eliminating what he thinks are Christians' interpolations in it; he also accepts the authenticity of the reference of Josephus to James the Just and Tacitus's reference to Jesus in the Annals.

=== Volume 2 ===
Volume 2 (1994) is in three main parts:

- Jesus' relationship to John the Baptist (as 'mentor')
- Jesus' message of the kingdom of God
- accounts of Jesus' miracles in ancient and modern minds.

The kingdom of God in the second part (pp. 235–506) is examined as to:

- the Old Testament, related writings, and Qumran
- Jesus' proclamation of a future kingdom
- the kingdom proclaimed by Jesus' words and deeds as already present in his ministry (pp. 451–53).

The third part applies the same criteria of historicity to miracle stories as to other aspects of Jesus' life. Rather than adopting say an exclusively agnostic or Christian perspective or relying on philosophical arguments whether miracles can occur, it poses narrower data-based historical questions (pp. 510–11, 517). Meier is quoted in a 1997 interview as saying: "The proper stance of a historian is, 'I neither claim beforehand that miracles are possible, nor do I claim beforehand they are not possible.'" Meier finds that Jesus' performance of extraordinary deeds deemed miracles at the time is best supported by the criteria of multiple attestation and the coherence of Jesus' deeds and words (p. 630). In moving from the global question of miracles to the particular, Meier examines each miracle story by broad category. That examination drives the conclusion that no single theory explains all such stories with equal assurance and applicability. Rather, it is suggested that some stories have no historical basis (such as the cursing of the fig tree) and that other stories likely go back to events in the life of Jesus (though theological judgment is required to affirm any miracle) (p. 968). At the global level again, Jesus as healer is as well supported as almost anything about the historical Jesus. In the Gospels, the activity of Jesus as miracle worker looms large in attracting attention to himself and reinforces his eschatological message. Such activity, Meier suggests, might have added to the concern of authorities that culminated in Jesus' death (p. 970).

=== Volume 3 ===
Volume 3 (2001) places Jesus in the Jewish context of his followers, the crowds, his competitors (including Samaritans, Pharisees, Essenes and proto-Zealots) and his enemies (Sadducees, Herodians and scribes) in first-century Palestine.

=== Volume 4 ===
Volume 4 (2009) deals with the ministry of the historical Jesus in relation to Mosaic Law, such subjects as divorce, oaths, and observance of the Sabbath and purity rules, and the various love commandments in the Gospels.

=== Volume 5 ===
Volume 5 (2016) challenges scholarly consensus about the parables and argues instead that only four parables (those of the Mustard Seed, the Evil Tenants, the Talents, and the Great Supper) can be attributed to the historical Jesus with fair certitude.

=== Volume 6 ===
According to his profile on the University of Notre Dame website, Meier was working on a sixth volume at the time he died. This volume would have addressed the titles used by and of the historical Jesus. The volume was left unfinished: its status and whether it will still be published after Meier's death is currently unclear.

== Critical reception ==
Meier was widely regarded as the foremost Catholic expert on the historical figure of Jesus on an international level. Antioch and Rome was reviewed in 1984 and 1985. A Marginal Jew vol. 1 was reviewed by Larry W. Hurtado in 1993. A Marginal Jew vol. 3 was reviewed by William Loader in 2002.

In his book Jesus of Nazareth: Holy Week, Pope Benedict XVI describes Meier's work as "a model of historical-critical exegesis, in which the significance and the limits of the method emerge clearly".

== Selected works by John P. Meier ==
=== Books ===
- Meier, John P. (1976). Law and History in Matthew's Gospel. Rome: Biblical Institute.
- ——— (1979). The Vision of Matthew. New York, NY: Paulist Press.
- ——— (1980). Matthew. Lex Orandi. Vol. 3. Collegeville, MN: Liturgical Press.
- ——— (1980). Access Guide to Matthew. New York: Sadlier.
- ———; Brown, Raymond E. (1983). Antioch and Rome: New Testament Cradles of Catholic Christianity. New York, NY: Paulist Press.
- ——— (1990). The Mission of Christ and His Church. Wilmington, DE: Glazier.
- ——— (1991). A Marginal Jew: Rethinking the Historical Jesus: Volume 1: The Roots of the Problem and the Person. Anchor Bible Reference Library Series (Reissued ed.). New York: Yale University Press. ISBN 978-0-3001-4018-7.
- ——— (1994). A Marginal Jew: Rethinking the Historical Jesus: Volume 2: Mentor, Message and Miracles. Anchor Bible Reference Library Series (Reissued ed.). New York: Yale University Press. ISBN 978-0-3001-4033-0.
- ——— (2001). A Marginal Jew: Rethinking the Historical Jesus: Volume 3: Companions and Competitors. Anchor Bible Reference Library Series (Reissued ed.). New York: Yale University Press. ISBN 978-0-3854-6993-7.
- ——— (2009). A Marginal Jew: Rethinking the Historical Jesus: Volume 4: Law and Love. Anchor Bible Reference Library Series. New York: Yale University Press. ISBN 978-0-3001-4096-5.
- ——— (2016). A Marginal Jew: Rethinking the Historical Jesus: Volume 5: Probing the Authenticity of the Parables. Anchor Bible Reference Library Series. New York: Yale University Press. ISBN 978-0-3002-1190-0.
- ——— (2015). Jésus et le divorce. Paris: Les Editions du CERF.

=== Articles and chapters ===
- ——— (1990). "Jesus". In Brown, Raymond E.; et al. (eds.). The New Jerome Biblical Commentary. Upper Saddle River, NJ: Prentice-Hall. pp. 1316–28. ISBN 0-13-614934-0.
- ——— (2008). "The Historical Jesus and the Historical Sabbath". In Udoh, Fabian E.; et al. (eds.). Redefining First-Century Jewish and Christian Identities. E. P. Sanders Festschrift. Vol. 1. Notre Dame, IN: Notre Dame Press. pp. 297–307.
- ——— (2010). "Petrine Ministry in the New Testament and in the Early Patristic Traditions". In Puglisi, James F.; et al. (eds.). How Can the Petrine Ministry Be a Service to the Unity of the Universal Church?. Vol. 1. Grand Rapids, MI: Eerdmans. pp. 13–33.
- ——— (2011). "Basic Methodology in the Quest for the Historical Jesus". In Holmen, Tom; Porter, S. E. (eds.). Handbook for the Study of the Historical Jesus. Vol. 1. Leiden: Brill. pp. 291–331.
- ——— (2012). "The Parable of the Wheat and the Weeds (Matt 13:24-30): Is Thomas's Version (Logion 57) Independent?". Journal of Biblical Literature. 131 (4): 715–732. doi:10.2307/23488264. JSTOR 23488264. S2CID 160358139.
- ——— (2012). "The Parable of the Wicked Tenants of the Vineyard: Is the Gospel of Thomas Independent of the Synoptics?". Frank Matera Festschrift. Vol. 1. Atlanta: Society of Biblical Literature.
- ——— (2012). "Is Luke's Version of the Parable of the Rich Fool Reflected in the Coptic Gospel of Thomas?". Catholic Biblical Quarterly. 74 (3): 528–547.
- ——— (2013). "The Historical Figure of Jesus: The Historical Jesus and His Historical Parables". In Estrada, Bernardo; et al. (eds.). The Gospels: History and Christology 2 vols. Vol. 1. Vatican City: Libreria Editrice Vaticana. pp. 237–60.
