= Criterion of multiple attestation =

Evaluating method for checking stories' historicity

The criterion of multiple attestation, also called the criterion of independent attestation or the cross-section method, is a tool used by Biblical scholars to help determine whether certain actions or sayings by Jesus in the New Testament are from the Historical Jesus. Simply put, the more independent witnesses that report an event or saying, the better. This criterion was first developed by F. C. Burkitt in 1906, at the end of the first quest for the historical Jesus.

== Description ==
Visualisation of the four-document hypothesis. In order to be both multiply and independently attested, it's not enough for a tradition to simply be found in two or three of the Synoptic Gospels. It needs to be attested in a combination of at least two out of the Marcan, Q, M, or L source materials. Otherwise, a non-Synoptic source is required to corroborate a tradition found in the Synoptics.

The gospels are not always independent of each other. Matthew and Luke, for example, are likely dependent on Mark. The criterion of multiple attestation focuses on the sayings or deeds of Jesus that are attested to in more than one independent literary source such as Mark, Paul, Q, M, L, John, Josephus, or Thomas. The force of this criterion is increased if a given motif or theme is also found in different literary forms such as parables, dispute stories, miracle stories, prophecy, and/or aphorism.

Potentially reliable sources that scholars have considered to be independent of one another for the purposes of this criterion include:

- Paul's 7 undisputed epistles
- Q source
- Gospel of Mark
- M source (special Matthean tradition)
- L source (special Lukan tradition)
- Gospel of John
- Josephus
- (Coptic) Gospel of Thomas (disputed by some)
- Gospel of Peter (possibly; its independence from the canonical Gospels is debated)
- Tacitus

== Examples of its use ==
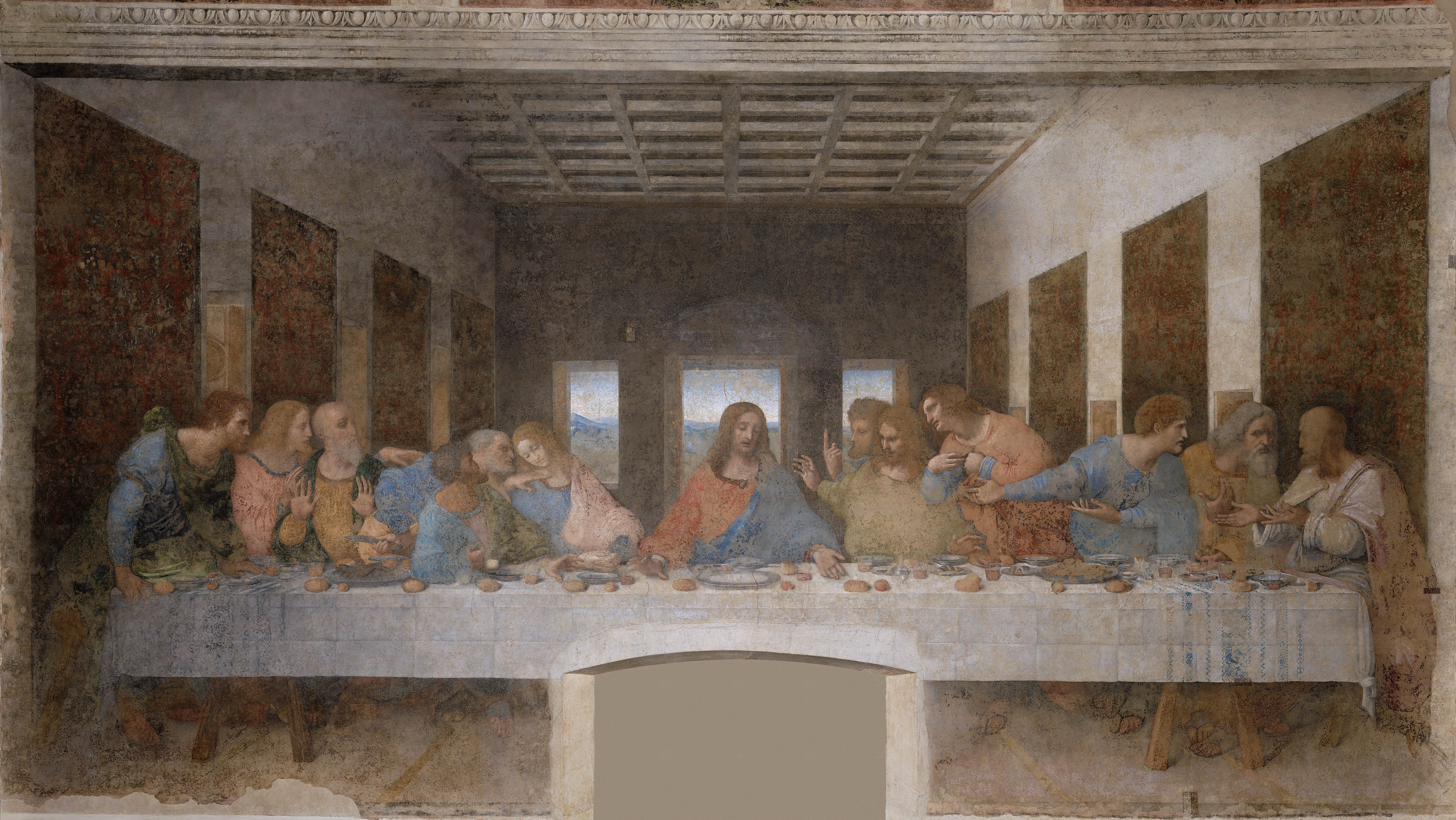
What Jesus reportedly said about bread and wine at the Last Supper passes the criterion of multiple attestation.

For example, the "Kingdom of God" motif appears in "Mark, Q, special Matthean tradition, special Lucan tradition, and John, with echoes in Paul, despite the fact that 'Kingdom of God' is not Paul's preferred way of speaking." It also appears in an array of literary genres.

The words attributed to Jesus on the bread and wine during the Last Supper (found in Mark 14:22–25 and 1 Corinthians 11:23–26 (Paul), compare to John 6:51–58) and his prohibition on divorce (found in Mark 10:11–12, Luke 16:18 (attributed to Q), and 1 Corinthians 7:10–11 (Paul)) are examples of sayings that are multiply attested. However, the Lord's Prayer, although found in both Matthew and Luke, evidently derives from their common source Q, and therefore cannot pass the criterion.

Perhaps the most widely independently attested event is the crucifixion of Jesus during the governorship of Pontius Pilate (and the emperorship of Tiberius), namely by Paul (the only one not to mention Pilate), all four canonical Gospels, the Gospel of Peter (its independence from the canonical Gospels is debated), Josephus, and even Tacitus. Another example of an event that is multiply attested is Jesus's meeting with John the Baptist (found in Mark, Q, and John). However, John does not explicitly mention the baptism of Jesus (merely having the Baptist saying he 'witnessed the spirit descending on [Jesus] like a dove', John 1:32) that is attested in Mark, although Theissen (2002) claimed that the Gospel of the Hebrews 2 did corroborate the baptism. The episode of Jesus and the rich young man is found in all three Synoptic Gospels, but is evidently dependent on Mark, and not mentioned outside the Synoptics, and therefore does not pass the criterion.

== Limitations ==
This criterion cannot be used for sources that are not independent. For example, a saying that occurs in all three Synoptic Gospels may only represent one source. Under the two-source hypothesis, both the authors of the Gospel of Matthew and the Gospel of Luke used the Gospel of Mark in their writings; therefore, triple-tradition material represents only a single source, Mark. The same problem exists under the four-source hypothesis, unless Q can be demonstrated to attest the same tradition independently from Mark. (The Augustinian hypothesis posits that Mark and Luke used Matthew, so once again triple-tradition material would have originated in a single source). Another limitation is that some sayings or deeds attributed to Jesus could have originated in the first Christian communities early enough in the tradition to be attested to by a number of independent sources, thus not representing the historical Jesus. Finally, there are some sayings or deeds of Jesus that only appear in one form or source that scholars still consider historically probable.

Multiple attestation has a certain kind of objectivity. Given the independence of the sources, satisfaction of the criterion makes it harder to maintain that it was an invention of early Christians. Multiple attestation is not always a requisite for historicity, nor is it enough to determine accuracy by itself. However useful, it is typically one of a number of criteria that have been developed by scholars to assess whether a tradition is likely to be historical; the widely-recognized criteria were distinguished by Stanley E. Porter as dissimilarity, coherence, multiple attestation, least distinctiveness and Aramaic linguistic background. Porter suggests three new criteria in the search for the words of the historical Jesus (Porter 2000), which have not yet found broad acceptance: a criterion of Greek language, of Greek textual variance and of "discourse features" at variance with the text's usual style. Of the criterion of multiple attestations, Porter makes the point, which has been expressed before, that multiple attestations identify common motifs rather than absolute wording, and speak only to the independence of documents and not their reliability.

== See also ==
- Criterion of contextual credibility
- Criterion of dissimilarity
- Criterion of embarrassment
- Independent sources
- Josephus on Jesus
- Mutawatir, an analogous concept in Islam

== Literature ==
- Porter, Stanley E. (2004). The Criteria for Authenticity in Historical-Jesus Research. New York: T&T Clark International. ISBN 978-0-56704-360-3.
