= Criterion of embarrassment =

Type of biblical historical analysis

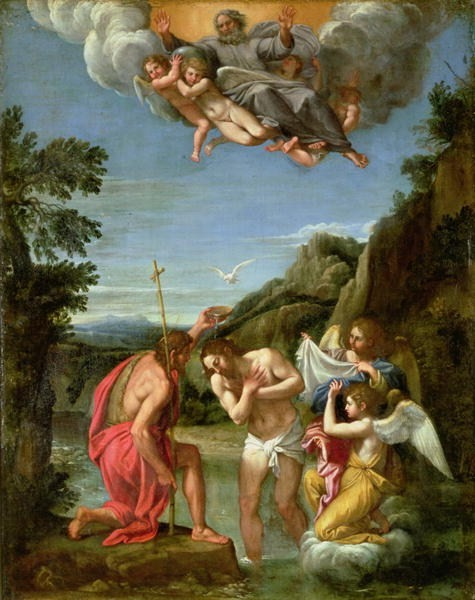
Baptism of Christ by Francesco Albani. Since it positions John as superior to Jesus, the criterion of embarrassment has been used to argue for the historicity of the baptism of Jesus by John the Baptist.

The criterion of embarrassment is a type of historical analysis in which a historical account is deemed more likely to be true if the author would have no reason to invent a historical account which might embarrass them. It is logically similar to statements against interest in a legal context. Certain Biblical scholars have used this as a meter for assessing whether the New Testament's accounts of Jesus's actions and words are historically probable.

The criterion of embarrassment is one of the criteria of authenticity used by academics, the others being the criterion of dissimilarity, the criterion of language and environment, criterion of coherence, and the criterion of multiple attestation.

== History ==
The criterion of embarrassment is an important tool of New Testament research. The phrase was used by John P. Meier in his 1991 book A Marginal Jew; he attributed it to Edward Schillebeeckx (1914–2009), who does not appear to have actually used the term in his written works. The earliest use of the approach was possibly by Paul Wilhelm Schmiedel in the Encyclopaedia Biblica (1899).

== Examples ==
The crucifixion of Jesus is an example of an event that meets the criterion of embarrassment. This method of execution was considered the most shameful and degrading in the Roman world, and advocates of the criterion claim this method of execution is therefore the least likely to have been invented by the followers of Jesus.

The assumption of the criterion of embarrassment is that the early church would hardly have gone out of its way to create or falsify historical material that embarrassed its author or weakened its position in arguments with opponents. Rather, embarrassing material coming from Jesus would be either suppressed or softened in later stages of the Gospel tradition. This criterion is rarely used by itself, and is typically one of a number of criteria, such as the criterion of dissimilarity and the criterion of multiple attestation, along with the historical method.

== Limitations ==
The criterion of embarrassment has its limitations and is almost always used in concert with the other criteria. One limitation to the criterion of embarrassment is that clear-cut cases of such embarrassment are few. Context is important, as what might be considered as embarrassing in one era and social context may not have been so in another. Embarrassing details may be included as an alternative to an even more embarrassing account of the same event. As a hypothetical example, Peter's denial of Jesus could have been a substitution for an even greater misdeed of Peter.

An example of the second point is found in the stories of the Infancy Gospels. In one account from the Infancy Gospel of Thomas, a very young Jesus is said to have used his supernatural powers first to strike dead, and then revive, a playmate who had accidentally bumped into him. If this tradition had been accepted as worthy of inclusion at some key juncture in the formation of the Christian Bible (and hence integrated in one way or another among the canonical Gospels), arguably many modern Christians would find it quite embarrassing—especially strict believers in biblical inerrancy. But as is suggested by the existence of this early non-canonical pericope, it must not have been embarrassing to some early Christians, if such were indeed its authors.

A further limitation is the possibility that what could be classed as embarrassing could also be an intentionally created account designed to provoke a reaction. For instance, Saint Peter's denial of Jesus could have been written as an example of the consequences of denial. Matthew 10:32–33: "Whoever acknowledges me before men, I will also acknowledge him before my Father in heaven. But whoever disowns me before men, I will disown him before my Father in heaven."

== See also ==
- Criterion of contextual credibility
- Lectio difficilior potior
- Declaration against interest
