= Semitism (linguistics) =

Aspects of languages influenced by Semitic languages

In linguistics, a Semitism or Semiticism is a grammatical, syntactical, lexical, or idiomatic feature in a language that reveals influence from a Semitic language such as Aramaic, Hebrew or Arabic. One of the most commonly studied examples is the influence of Aramaic on some texts written in Jewish Koine Greek.

== Akkadianism ==
An Akkadianism is a linguistic feature from the Akkadian language, one of the East Semitic languages, which was spoken in ancient Mesopotamia from the 3rd millennium BCE until its replacement by Aramaic, which arrived there from modern-day Syria. Akkadianisms appeared in neighboring languages as a result of contact. Akkadianisms have been found in the Book of Ezekiel.

== Ugaritism ==
An Ugaritism is a linguistic feature from Ugaritic, a Northwest Semitic language attested in texts from the ancient city of Ugarit (modern-day Ras Shamra, Syria) during the Late Bronze Age.

== Phoenicianism ==
A Phoenicianism is a linguistic feature from the Phoenician language, a Northwest Semitic language spoken by the ancient Phoenicians during the Iron Age.

== Aramaism ==
Aramaic was a widely used lingua franca in the ancient Near East from around the 9th century BCE and influenced neighboring languages, especially Hebrew and Greek. Many Semitisms in the Greek of the New Testament are considered Aramaisms, reflecting the Aramaic-speaking context of the authors.

== Hebraism ==
Hebraisms have appeared in European languages like Greek and Latin through translations of the Hebrew Bible. Hebraisms also appeared in Yiddish.

== Arabism ==
Arabisms entered languages such as Persian and Swahili following the rise of Islam in the 7th century CE. Arabic loanwords entered European languages as well.

== Sources ==
- Butler, B. C. (2011) [1951]. The Originality of St Matthew. Cambridge University Press.
- Kemp, Joel B. (2020). Ezekiel, Law, and Judahite Identity.
