= Stanley E. Porter =

Canadian–American academic and New Testament scholar (born 1956)

- Born: November 23, 1956 (age 69); Long Beach, California, US
- Title: President, Dean, and Professor of New Testament of McMaster Divinity College | Roy A. Hope Chair in Christian Worldview

Academic background
- Education: Point Loma College; Claremont Graduate School; Trinity Evangelical Divinity School; University of Sheffield
- Thesis: Verbal Aspect in the Greek of the New Testament (1988)
- Doctoral advisor: John W. Rogerson; Nigel Gotteri; Anthony C. Thiselton

Academic work
- Discipline: Biblical studies
- Sub-discipline: New Testament; Koine Greek; Systemic Functional Linguistics
- Institutions: Biola University; Trinity Western University; Roehampton University; McMaster Divinity College

Stanley E. Porter (born November 23, 1956) is an American-Canadian academic and New Testament scholar, specializing in the Koine Greek grammar and linguistics of the New Testament.

== Life and career ==
Porter was born in Long Beach, California, on November 23, 1956. He studied at Point Loma College, San Diego (B.A., English), Claremont Graduate School, Claremont, California (M.A., English), Trinity Evangelical Divinity School, Deerfield, Illinois (M.A., New Testament), and earned his Ph.D. at the University of Sheffield, Sheffield, UK, in 1988, in both the biblical studies and linguistics departments. He began his teaching career at Biola University, where he taught New Testament, Greek, and English, then taught at Trinity Western University. From 1994, he was professor of theology and head of the Department of Theology and Religious Studies at the University of Surrey Roehampton (formerly Roehampton Institute London, now Roehampton University). Since 2001, he has served as president, dean, and professor of New Testament at McMaster Divinity College (MDC) in Hamilton, Ontario. Since 2013, he has also held the Roy A. Hope Chair in Christian Worldview at MDC.

== Academic work ==
Porter is primarily noted for his work on verbal aspect in the Koine Greek of the New Testament, as he has argued that aspect is the major semantic category in the analysis of the Greek verbal system, recognizing three aspects: perfective, imperfective and stative. He has also argued that the Greek verb does not encode temporality but that temporality is depicted by other deictic indicators. His linguistic framework stems from systemic functional linguistics (SFL), founded by Michael Halliday, as can be seen in his use of systemic grammar and system networks in his framework of Greek and aspect, and his use of SFL discourse analysis and register analysis (including cohesion, prominence, and thematization) for biblical interpretation. In addition to Greek linguistics, he has also published on a wide range of other topics, including Paul, Acts, John, the Gospels, historical Jesus, papyrology and textual criticism, hermeneutics, rhetorical criticism, and matters of canon and pseudepigraphy. Porter has contributed to a variety of topics in New Testament studies. For example, in historical Jesus studies, he has argued for adding to the criteria of authenticity the criterion of Greek language and its context, the criterion of Greek textual variance, and the criterion of discourse features. In Pauline studies, he has argued for the Pauline letter collection view that Paul was directly involved in collecting his letters. In textual criticism, he has advocated using the earliest New Testament manuscript for the study of the Greek New Testament, such as Codex Sinaiticus for the entire New Testament, rather than eclectic editions that are commonly used. He has also resurrected the argument, developing the ideas of William Ramsay, Johannes Weiss, and James Hope Moulton, that Paul had likely met Jesus before his crucifixion as a young Pharisee in Jerusalem. In addition to his extensive publishing activities, Porter has served as editor, co-editor, or editorial board member for a number of book series, journals, and publishers (see below). He was also the executive editor of Sheffield Academic Press during the 1990s, and since 2008 has served as the editor-in-chief of McMaster Divinity College Press (published collaboratively with Wipf & Stock Publishers). In 2008, he founded the MDC Linguistics Circle, fashioned after the Prague Linguistics Circle (or Prague School), which meets monthly during the academic year and hosts discussions on papers by students, faculty, and guest scholars using linguistic methodology for biblical interpretation.

== Publishing activities ==
Porter is widely renown in biblical studies for his prolific research and publication output. As of 2024, he has authored or co-authored more than 35 books and monographs, 120 articles in academic journals and periodicals, and 300 chapters in books or edited volumes. In addition, he has been editor or co-editor for nearly 150 volumes.

In addition to his extensive publishing activities, Porter has served as editor, co-editor, or editorial board member for numerous book series, journals, and publishers, including:

- Library of New Testament Greek (Bloomsbury T&T Clark) [2022–present]
- Baker Greek Grammar Series (Baker Academic) [2018–present]
- Linguistic Exegesis of the New Testament (MDC Press/Wipf & Stock) [2018–present]
- Milestones in New Testament Scholarship Series (Kregel) [2017–present]
- Johannine Studies Series (Brill) [2013–present]
- Brill Exegetical Commentary Series (Brill) [2009–present]
- Linguistic Biblical Studies (Brill) [2009–present]
- New Testament Monographs (Sheffield Phoenix) [2004–2016]
- Pauline Studies Series (Brill) [1998–present]
- Texts and Editions for New Testament Study Series (Brill) [1998–present]
- Septuagint Commentary Series (Brill) [1997–present]
- Library of Pauline Studies (Hendrickson) [1995–2010]
- JSNT Supplement Series (Sheffield Academic) [1992–2003]
- Journal of Biblical Text Research [2018–present]
- Biblical and Ancient Greek Linguistics [2012–present]
- Journal for the Study of Paul and His Letters [2012–2022]
- Christian Higher Education [2010–present]
- The Bible Translator [2002–present]
- Journal for the Study of the New Testament [2002–present]
- McMaster Journal of Theology and Ministry [2001–present]
- Journal for the Study of the Historical Jesus [2001–2019]
- Journal of Greco-Roman Christianity and Judaism [1998–present]
- Jian Dao: A Journal of Bible and Theology [1995–present]
- Filología Neotestamentaria [1994–present]

== Awards ==
Porter was presented a Festschrift in November 2016 during the Society of Biblical Literature Annual Meeting on the occasion of his 60th birthday: The Language and Literature of the New Testament: Essays in Honor of Stanley E. Porter’s 60th Birthday (ed. Lois K. Fuller Dow, Craig A. Evans, and Andrew W. Pitts; Biblical Interpretation Series 150; Leiden: Brill, 2017).

== Selected publications ==
=== Authored books and monographs ===
- Porter, Stanley E. (1989). Verbal Aspect in the Greek of the New Testament with Reference to Tense and Mood. Studies in Biblical Greek. Vol. 1. New York: Peter Lang. ISBN 9780820424231.
- ——— (1992). Idioms of the Greek New Testament. Biblical Languages: Greek. Vol. 2. Sheffield: Sheffield Academic. ISBN 9781850753797.
- ——— (1994). Καταλλάσσω in Ancient Greek Literature, with Reference to the Pauline Writings. Estudios de Filología Neotestamentaria. Vol. 5. Córdoba, Spain: Ediciones el Almendro. ISBN 9788480050111.
- ———; McDonald, Lee Martin (1995). New Testament Introduction. Grand Rapids: Baker. ISBN 9780801020605.
- ——— (1996). Studies in the Greek New Testament: Theory and Practice. Studies in Biblical Greek. Vol. 6. New York: Peter Lang. ISBN 978-0820428581.
- ———; Weima, Jeffrey A.D. (1998). An Annotated Bibliography of 1 and 2 Thessalonians. New Testament Tools and Studies. Vol. 26. Leiden: Brill. ISBN 978-9004107403.
- ——— (1999). The Paul of Acts: Essays in Literary Criticism, Rhetoric, and Theology. Wissenschaftliche Untersuchungen zum Neuen Testament. Vol. 115. Tübingen: Mohr Siebeck. ISBN 9783161471049.
- ——— (2000). Criteria For Authenticity in Historical-Jesus Research. Journal for the Study of the New Testament Supplement Series. Vol. 191. Sheffield: Sheffield Academic. ISBN 9781841270890.
- ———; McDonald, Lee Martin (2000). Early Christianity and its Sacred Literature. Peabody, MA: Hendrickson. ISBN 978-1565632660.
- ———; Bedard, Stephen J. (2006). Unmasking the Pagan Christ: An Evangelical Response to the Cosmic Christ Idea. Toronto: Clements. ISBN 978-1894667715.
- ———; Heath; Gordon L. (2007). The Lost Gospel of Judas: Separating Fact from Fiction. Grand Rapids: Eerdmans. ISBN 978-0802824561.
- ——— (2010). Inking the Deal: A Guide for Successful Academic Publishing. Waco, TX: Baylor University Press. ISBN 978-1602582651.
- ———; Reed, Jeffrey T.; O'Donnell, Matthew Brook (2010). Fundamentals of New Testament Greek. Grand Rapids: Eerdmans. ISBN 978-0802828262.
- ———; Robinson, Jason C. (2011). Hermeneutics: An Introduction to Interpretive Theory. Grand Rapids: Eerdmans. ISBN 978-0802866578.
- ———; Gabriel, Andrew K. (2013). Johannine Writings and Apocalyptic: An Annotated Bibliography. Johannine Studies. Vol. 1. Leiden: Brill. ISBN 978-9004254459.
- ——— (2013). How We Got the New Testament: Text, Transmission, Translation. Grand Rapids: Baker Academic. ISBN 978-0801048715.
- ——— (2015). Constantine Tischendorf: The Life and Work of a 19th Century Bible Hunter, Including Constantine Tischendorf's When Were Our Gospels Written. Leiden: Bloomsbury. ISBN 9780567658029.
- ——— (2015). Linguistic Analysis of the Greek New Testament: Studies in Tools, Methods, and Practice. Grand Rapids: Baker Academic. ISBN 978-0801049989.
- ——— (2015). John, His Gospel, and Jesus: In Pursuit of the Johannine Voice. Grand Rapids: Eerdmans. ISBN 9780802871701.
- ——— (2015). The Letter to the Romans: A Linguistic and Literary Commentary. New Testament Monographs. Vol. 37. Sheffield: Sheffield Phoenix. ISBN 978-1905048472.
- ———; Pitts, Andrew W. (2015). Fundamentals of New Testament Textual Criticism. Grand Rapids: Eerdmans. ISBN 9780802872241.
- ——— (2016). Sacred Tradition in the New Testament: Tracing Old Testament Themes in the Gospels and Epistles. With a chapter by Bryan R. Dyer. Grand Rapids: Baker Academic. ISBN 978-0-801-03077-2.
- ——— (2016). When Paul Met Jesus: How an Idea Got Lost in History. Cambridge: Cambridge University Press. ISBN 978-1107127968.
- ——— (2016). The Apostle Paul: His Life, Thought, and Letters. Grand Rapids: Eerdmans. ISBN 978-0802841148.
- ———; Robinson, Jason C. (2021). Active Hermeneutics: Seeking Understanding in an Age of Objectivism. Routledge New Critical Thinking in Religion, Theology, and Biblical Studies. London: Routledge. ISBN 9780367687427.
- ——— (2022). New Testament Theology and the Greek Language: A Linguistic Reconceptualization. Cambridge: Cambridge University Press. ISBN 978-1009240048.
- ———; Dyer, Bryan R. (2023). Origins of New Testament Christology: An Introduction to the Traditions and Titles Applied to Jesus. Grand Rapids: Baker Academic. ISBN 978-0801098710.
- ——— (2023). Interpretation for Preaching and Teaching: An Introduction to Biblical Hermeneutics. Grand Rapids: Baker Academic. ISBN 978-1540966377.
- ———; Yoon, David I. (2023). Romans: A Handbook on the Greek Text. Baylor Handbook on the Greek New Testament. Waco, TX: Baylor University Press. ISBN 978-1932792614.
- ——— (2023). The Pastoral Epistles: A Commentary on the Greek Text. Grand Rapids: Baker Academic. ISBN 978-0801027185.
- ——— (2023). Linguistic Descriptions of the Greek New Testament: New Studies in Systemic Functional Linguistics. Library of New Testament Greek. Vol. 1. London: T&T Clark. ISBN 9780567710024.
- ———; O'Donnell, Matthew Brook (2024). Discourse Analysis and the Greek New Testament: Text-Generating Resources. Library of New Testament Greek. Vol. 2. London: T&T Clark. ISBN 9780567709851.
- ——— (2024). Hermeneutics, Linguistics, and the Bible: The Importance of Context. Library of New Testament Greek. Vol. 3. London: T&T Clark. ISBN 9780567709905.

=== Edited volumes ===
- Porter, Stanley E.; Porter, Wendy J., eds. (2008). New Testament Greek Papyri and Parchments: New Editions: Texts. Mitteilungen aus der Papyrussammlung der Österreichischen Nationalbibliothek. Vol. 2/29. Berlin: de Gruyter. ISBN 978-3110203080.
- ———; Holmén, Tom, eds. (2011). Handbook for the Study of the Historical Jesus. Vol. 4 vols. Leiden: Brill. ISBN 9789004163720.
- ———; Dyer, Bryan R., eds. (2016). The Synoptic Problem: Four Views. Grand Rapids: Baker Academic. ISBN 9781493404452.
- ———; Adams, Sean A., eds. (2016). Pillars in the History of Biblical Interpretation. Vol. 2 vols. Eugene, OR: Wipf & Stock. ISBN 9781498202367.
- ———; Fay, Ron C., eds. (2018). The Gospel of John in Modern Interpretation. Milestones in New Testament Scholarship. Grand Rapids: Kregel. ISBN 9780825445101.
