= S. G. F. Brandon =

British Anglican priest (1907–1971)

The Reverend S. G. F. Brandon
- Born: Samuel George Frederick Brandon; 1907; Devon, England
- Died: 21 October 1971 (aged 63–64)

Ecclesiastical career
- Religion: Christianity (Anglican)
- Church: Church of England
- Ordained: 1932 (priest)

Academic background
- Education: University of Leeds

Academic work
- Discipline: Religious studies
- Sub-discipline: Comparative religion
- Institutions: University of Manchester
- Notable works: Jesus and the Zealots (1967)
- Influenced: John W. Rogerson; Eric J. Sharpe

Samuel George Frederick Brandon (1907 – 21 October 1971) was a British Anglican priest and scholar of comparative religion. He became professor of comparative religion at the University of Manchester in 1951.

== Biography ==
Born in Devon in 1907, Brandon was a graduate of the University of Leeds. He was ordained as a priest in 1932 after Anglican training at Mirfield, and then spent seven years as a parish priest before enrolling as an army chaplain in the Second World War, after which he began a successful academic career in 1951 as an historian of religion. Brandon's most influential work, Jesus and the Zealots, was published in 1967, wherein he advanced the claim that Jesus fitted well within the ideology of the anti-Roman Zealot group.

He was elected general secretary of the International Association for the History of Religions in 1970.

As he flew over the Mediterranean Sea on 21 October 1971, he died of an infection he had contracted while working in Egypt.

== Ideas ==
His thinking on New Testament themes grew out of The Fall of Jerusalem and the Christian Church (1951). His most celebrated position is a controversial one that echoes the works of Hermann Reimarus, that the historical Jesus was a political revolutionary figure, influenced in that by the Zealots; this he argued in the 1967 book Jesus and the Zealots: A Study of the Political Factor in Primitive Christianity.

The Trial of Jesus of Nazareth (1968) raises again, amongst other matters, the question of how the Fall of the Temple in 70 CE shaped the emerging Christian faith, and in particular the Gospel of Mark.

He was a critic of the myth-ritual theory, writing a 1958 essay "The Myth and Ritual Position Critically Examined" attacking its assumptions.

Brandon also claimed that the Pauline epistles and the accounts of Jesus Christ found in the Gospels represented two opposing factions of Christianity, a view first proposed by 19th century Hegelian theologian Ferdinand Christian Baur.

== Selected works ==
- The Fall of Jerusalem and the Christian Church (1951)
- Time and Mankind: An Historical and Philosophical Study of Mankind's Attitude to the Phenomena of Change (1954)
- Man and His Destiny in the Great Religions: An Historical and Comparative Study (1962)
- Creation Legends of the Ancient Near East (1963)
- History, Time, and Deity (1965)
- The Judgment of the Dead: The Idea of Life After Death in the Major Religions (1967)
- Jesus and the Zealots: A Study of the Political Factor in Primitive Christianity (1967)
- The Trial of Jesus of Nazareth (1968)
- Religion in Ancient History: Studies in Ideas, Men, and Events (1969)
- Ancient Empires (1970)

=== As editor ===
- The Saviour God: Comparative Studies in the Concept of Salvation (1963)
- A Dictionary of Comparative Religion (1970)

== See also ==
- Foundations of Christianity (German: Der Ursprung des Christentums), a 1908 book by Marxist philosopher Karl Kautsky which contended that Christianity was born out of a group of Jewish proletarians who sought to defeat the Romans through a violent insurrection.
- The Holy Blood and the Holy Grail, despite its seriousness, the hypothesis of Brandon is a key figure in the content of this pseudohistorical book.
- Zealot: The Life and Times of Jesus of Nazareth, a 2013 New York Times best seller which follows Brandon in his general thesis but written by a non-biblical scholar.

Scholars who have advanced the same ideas:

- Fernando Bermejo Rubio
- Shmuley Boteach
- Bruce Chilton
- Robert Eisler
- Zev Garber
- Hyam Maccoby
- Zhu Weizhi
- Bouck White

Scholars who have advanced related ideas:

- Obery M. Hendricks Jr.
- Richard Horsley
- David Kaylor
- Antonio Piñero
- Douglas E. Oakman

Archaeologists who have advanced the same ideas:

- Neil Faulkner

Archaeologists who have advanced related ideas:

- Jean-Pierre Isbouts
- Neil Asher Silberman
- James D. Tabor
