= Scholarly interpretation of Gospel elements =

Scholars have given various interpretations of the elements of the Gospel stories.

== Chronology ==
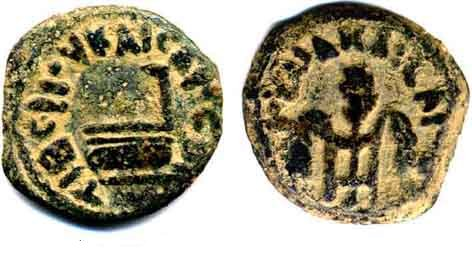
A bronze prutah minted by Pontius Pilate, the prefect of Roman Judea

The approximate chronology of Jesus can be estimated from non-Christian sources, and confirmed by correlating them with New Testament accounts.

The baptism of Jesus by John the Baptist places him in the Baptist's era, whose chronology can be determined from Josephus' reference (Antiquities 18.5.2) to the marriage of Herod Antipas and Herodias and the subsequent defeat of Herod by Aretas IV of Nabatea in AD 36. Most scholars date the marriage of Herod and Herodias, which Josephus relates to the execution of the Baptist by Herod, as AD 28–35, indicating a date somewhat earlier than that for the baptism of Jesus by John.

A number of approaches have been used to estimate the date of the crucifixion of Jesus. One approach relies on the dates of the prefecture of Pontius Pilate who was governor of Roman Judea from 26 AD until 36 AD, after which he was replaced by Marcellus, 36-37 AD. Another approach which provides an upper bound for the year of death of Jesus is working backwards from the chronology of Apostle Paul, which can be historically pegged to his trial in Corinth by Roman proconsul Gallio, the date of whose reign is confirmed in the Delphi Inscription discovered in the 20th century at the Temple of Apollo. Two independent astronomical methods (one going back to Isaac Newton) have also been used, suggesting the same year, i.e. 33 AD. Scholars generally agree that Jesus died between 30 and 36 AD.

== Judean background ==
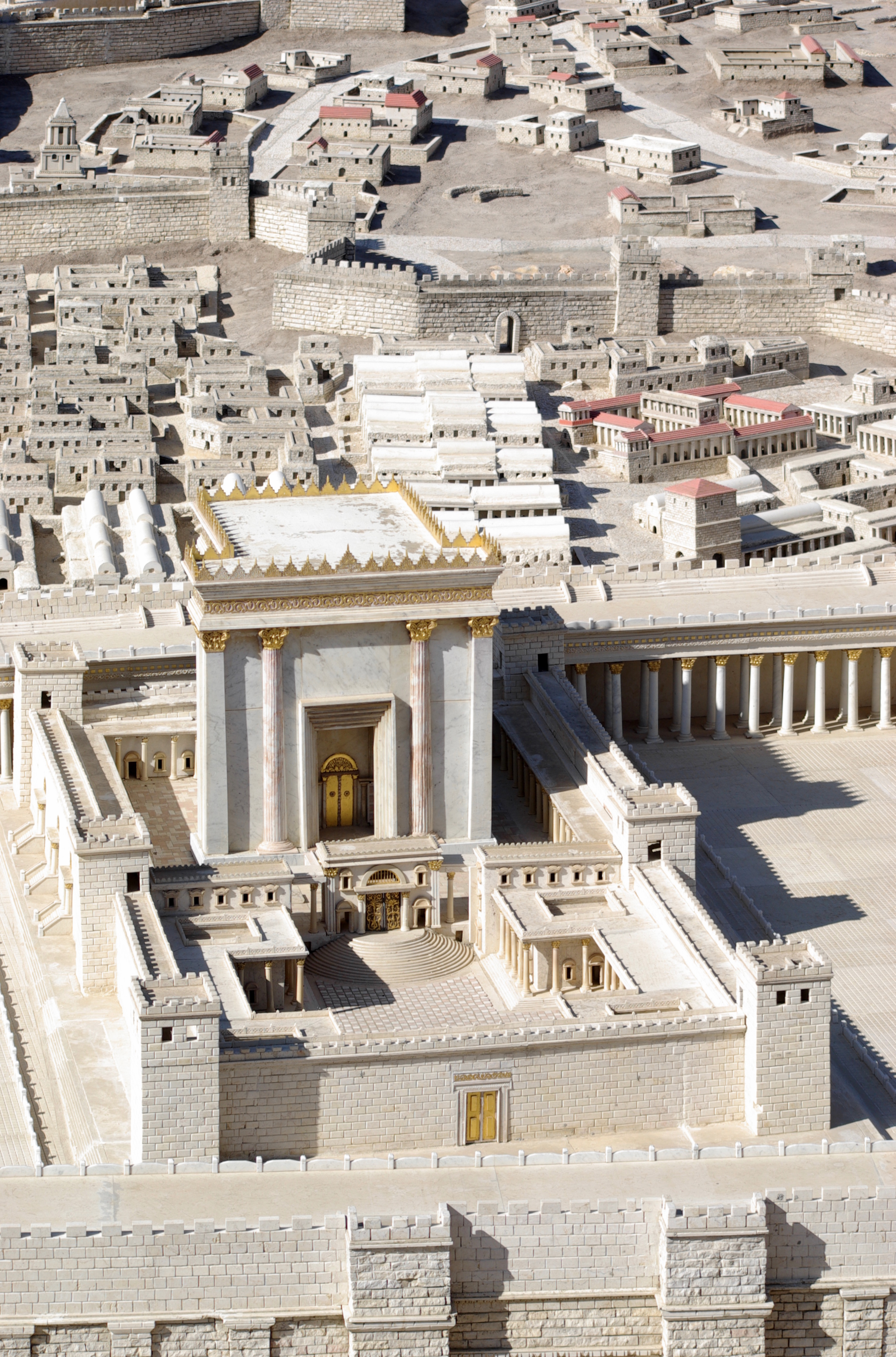
Herod's Temple as imagined in the Holyland Model of Jerusalem. It is currently situated adjacent to the Shrine of the Book exhibit at the Israel Museum, Jerusalem.

The historical and cultural context of Roman Judea and the tensions in the region at that time, provide a historical context to descriptions of the life of Jesus.

Following the successful Maccabean Revolt against the Seleucids, there was a growth of an apocalyptic view that the world was either in or approaching the End Times, when a messiah would restore the Kingdom of David.

In the time of Jesus' adulthood Judea was under Roman imperial rule. Roman prefects were appointed to the territory to maintain order and collect taxes, and to control Jerusalem through a political appointee, the High Priest. The imposition of a Roman system of taxation, and conflict between the Jews' demand for religious independence and Rome's efforts to impose a common system of governance meant there was continuous underlying tension in the area.

In the Judaic religion of Jesus' day (Second Temple Judaism), the Pharisees and the Sadducees were the two significant and opposing power groups. The Sadducees were generally high ranking priests with wealth and nobility who often favored the upper classes and had a strict interpretation of the Torah. The Pharisees (who used a more flexible interpretation of the Torah) were formed as a "separatist" movement and had a somewhat more democratic approach which favored the common people. The Sadducees had significant power based on their close association with the Jerusalem Temple and by virtue of the seats they held in the Sanhedrin, which was the governing council for the Jews.

== Language, race and appearance ==
Per the Bible, Jesus grew up in Galilee and much of his ministry took place there. The language spoken in Galilee and Judea during the 1st century amongst the common people was most frequently the Semitic Aramaic tongue, and most scholars support the theory that Jesus spoke Aramaic, although he may have also spoken Hebrew and perhaps had some fluency in Greek. James D. G. Dunn states that there is "substantial consensus" that Jesus gave his teachings in Aramaic. The Galilean dialect of Aramaic was clearly distinguishable from the Judean dialect.

Despite the lack of direct biblical or historical references, various theories about the race of Jesus have been advanced and debated. These claims have been mostly subjective, based on cultural stereotypes and societal trends rather than on scientific analysis. In a review of the state of modern scholarship, Amy-Jill Levine stated: "Beyond recognizing that 'Jesus was Jewish' rarely does scholarship address what being 'Jewish' means."

== Profession ==
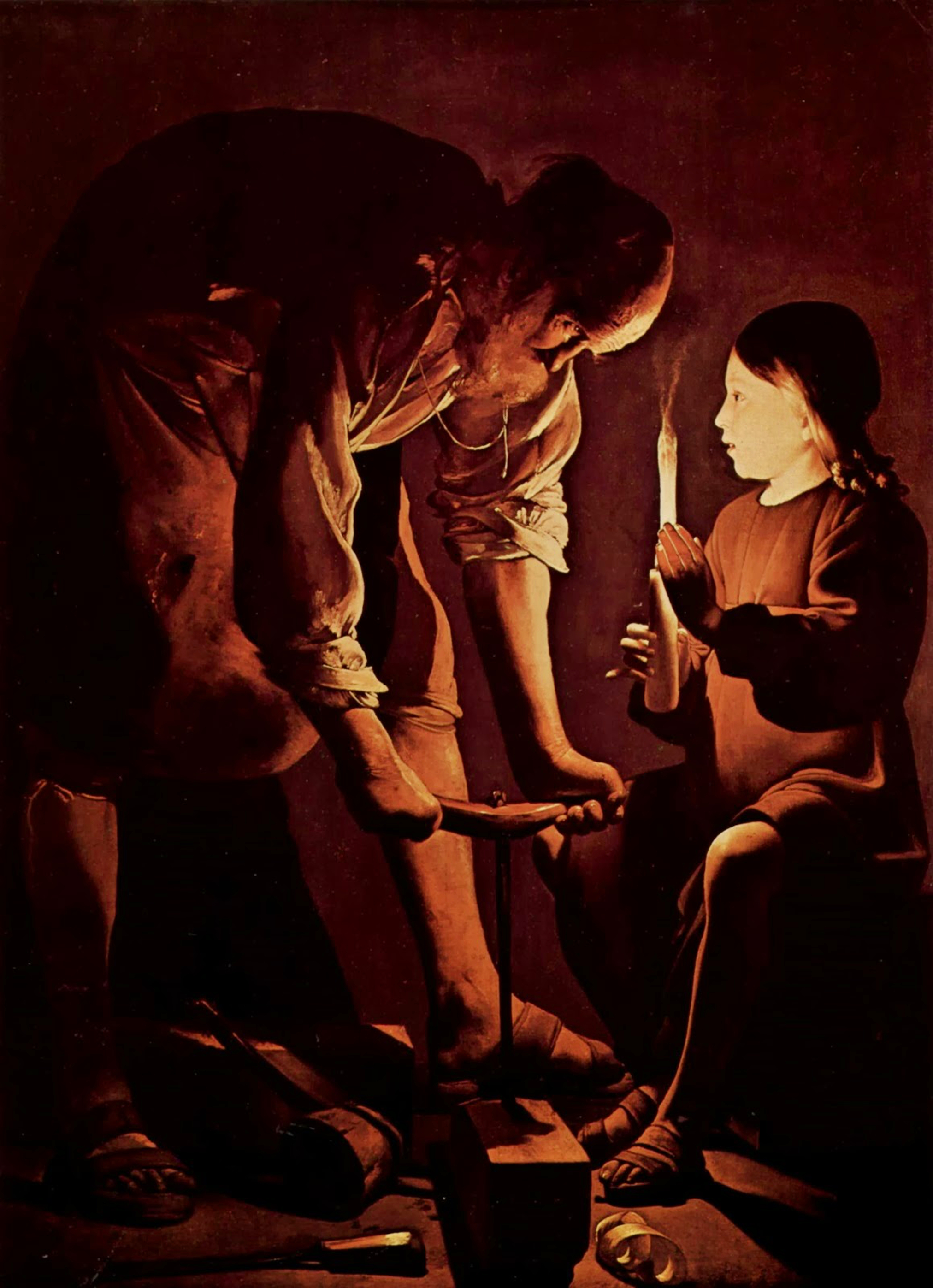
Joseph the Carpenter, c. 1645, by Georges de La Tour, depicts young Jesus in Joseph's workshop

Jesus is identified as the son of a τέκτων (tekton) and in Mark 6:3 a crowd surmises that Jesus was a tekton himself. Tekton has been traditionally translated into English as "carpenter", but is a rather general word (from the same root that gives us "technical" and "technology") that could cover makers of objects in various materials, including builders. But the specific association with woodworking was a constant in Early Christian writings; Justin Martyr (died c. 165) wrote that Jesus made yokes and ploughs, and there are similar early references.

Other scholars have argued that tekton could equally mean a highly skilled craftsman in wood or the more prestigious metal, perhaps running a workshop with several employees, and noted sources recording the shortage of skilled artisans at the time. Geza Vermes has stated that the terms 'carpenter' and 'son of a carpenter' are used in the Jewish Talmud to signify a very learned man, and he suggests that a description of Joseph as 'naggar' (a carpenter) could indicate that he was considered wise and highly literate in the Torah.

Debate exists about the existence of Nazareth at the time of Joseph and Jesus, as it was not mentioned in any contemporary source. At best it was an obscure village in Galilee, about 65 km from the Holy City of Jerusalem, which is only later mentioned in surviving non-Christian texts and documents. Archaeology over most of the site is made very difficult by subsequent building, but from what has been excavated and tombs in the area around the village, it is estimated that the population was at most about 400. It was, however, only about six kilometres from the city of Sepphoris, which was destroyed by the Romans in 4 BCE, and thereafter was expensively rebuilt. Jonathan L. Reed states that the analysis of the landscape and other evidence suggest that in Jesus' and Joseph's lifetime Nazareth was "oriented towards" the nearby city.

== Literacy ==
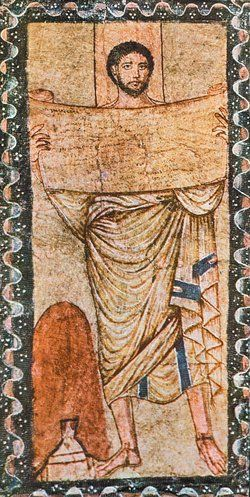
Ezra Reads the Law (Dura-Europos, mid-3rd century AD)

There are strong indications of a high illiteracy rate among the lower socio-economic classes in the Roman Empire at large, with various scholars estimating 3% to 10% literacy rates. However, the Babylonian Talmud (which dates from the 3rd to 5th centuries) states that the Jews had schools in nearly every one of their towns.

Geoffrey Bromiley states that as a "religion of the book" Judaism emphasized reading and study, and people would read to themselves in a loud voice, rather than silently, a practice encouraged (Erubin 54a) by the Rabbis. James D. G. Dunn states that Second Temple Judaism placed a great deal of emphasis on the study of Torah, and the "writing prophets" of Judaism assumed that sections of the public could read. Dunn and separately Donahue and Harrington refer to the statement by 1st-century historian Josephus in Against Apion (2.204) that the "law requires that they (children) be taught to read" as an indication of high literacy rate among some 1st-century Jews. Richard A. Horsley, on the other hand, states that the Josephus reference to learn "grammata" may not necessarily refer to reading and may be about an oral tradition.

There are a number of passages from the Gospels which state or imply that Jesus could read. The Jesus Seminar stated that references in the Gospels to Jesus reading and writing may be fictions. John Dominic Crossan who views Jesus as a peasant states that he would not have been literate. Craig A. Evans states that it should not be assumed that Jesus was a peasant, and that his extended travels may indicate some measure of financial means. Evans states that existing data indicate that Jesus could read scripture, paraphrase and debate it, but that does not imply that he received formal scribal training, given the divergence of his views from the existing religious background of his time. James Dunn states that it is "quite credible" that Jesus could read. John P. Meier further concludes that the literacy of Jesus probably extended to the ability to read and comment on sophisticated theological and literary works.

== Miracles ==
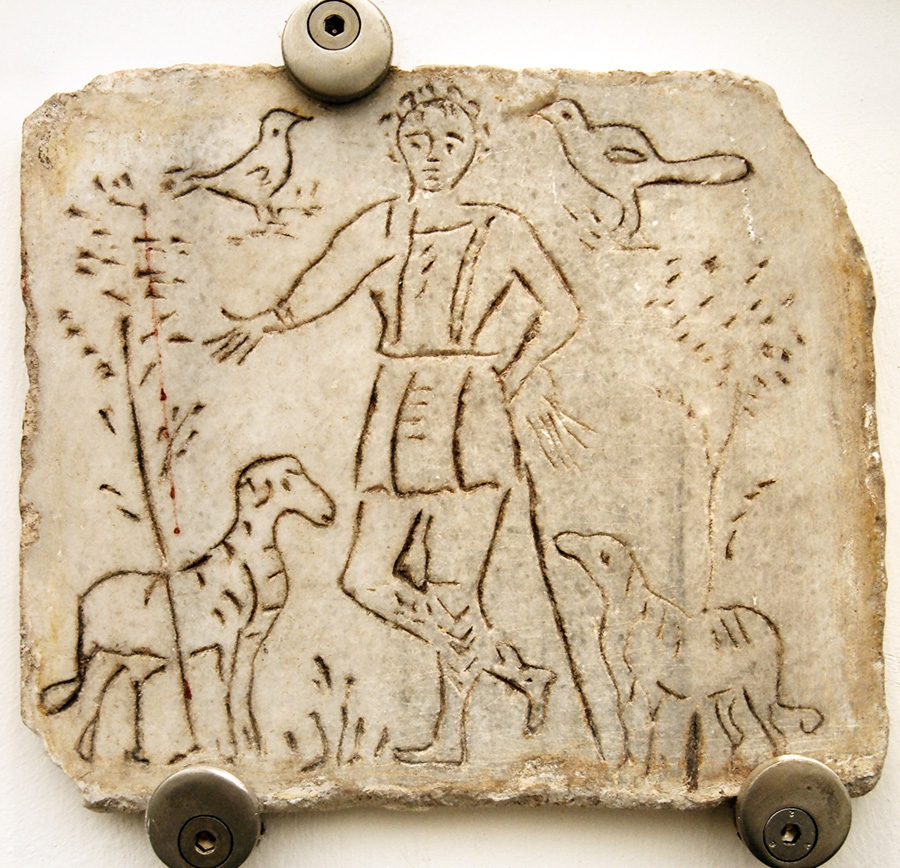
Early Christian image of the Good Shepherd. Fourth century.

The miracles of Jesus are the supernatural deeds attributed to Jesus in Christian and Islamic texts. The majority are faith healing, exorcisms, resurrection of the dead and control over nature.

The majority of scholars agree that Jesus was a healer and an exorcist. In Mark 3:22, Jesus' opponents accuse him of being possessed by Beelzebul, which they claimed gave him the power to exorcise demons. Extrabiblical sources for Jesus performing miracles include Josephus, Celsus, and the Talmud.

== Epithets ==
=== Divinity ===
The majority of contemporary scholars approach the question of Jesus' divinity by attempting to determine what Jesus might have thought of himself. Multiple scholars assert there is no evidence indicating Jesus had any divine self-awareness. Gerald Bray writes that "All we can say for sure about Jesus' early years is that whatever he understood about himself and his future mission, he kept it to himself."

Jesus' public ministry began with baptism by John. The evangelist writes that John proclaims Jesus to be "the Lamb of God, who takes away the sin of the world." Bray says it would be odd for John to know that about Jesus upon meeting him but Jesus not to know it about himself. It has been argued by some, such as Bart Ehrman, that such statements are later interpolations by the church. However, there is a compelling argument against interpolation since the early credal statements within the Pauline letters indicate the church's belief in a high Christology was very early. There is also a high Christology in the book of John with at least 17 statements (some of which are disputed) claiming divinity.

According to "kenotic Christology," taken from the Greek noun kēnosis for "emptying" in Philippians 2, Jesus surrendered his divinity in order to become a man, which would mean Jesus was not divine while on earth. There are also Jesus' own statements of inferiority to the Father that must be taken into account. Arianism makes Jesus divine but not fully God; the theologian Gerald Bray says such Arianism may be the majority view today in otherwise orthodox Christian organizations that is simply practiced under another name.

The evangelist's stories, that might indicate Jesus' belief in himself as divine, are: the temptations in the desert, the Transfiguration, his ministry of forgiving sins, the miracles, the exorcisms, the last supper, the resurrection, and the post-resurrection appearances. Some scholars argue that Jesus' use of three important terms: Messiah, Son of God, and Son of Man, added to his "I am the..." and his "I have come..." statements, indicate Jesus saw himself in a divine role. Bray says Jesus probably did teach his disciples he was the Son of God, because if he had not, no first century monotheistic Jew would have tolerated the suggestion from others. Jesus also called himself the "Son of Man" tying the term to the eschatological figure in Daniel.

=== Messiah ===
In the Hebrew Bible, three classes of people are identified as "anointed," that is, "Messiahs": prophets, priests, and kings. In Jesus' time, the term Messiah was used in different ways, and no one can be sure how Jesus would even have meant it if he had accepted the term.

The Jews of Jesus' time waited expectantly for a divine redeemer who would restore Israel, which had suffered foreign conquest and occupation for hundreds of years. John the Baptist was apparently waiting for one greater than himself, an apocalyptic figure. Christian scripture and faith acclaim Jesus as this "Messiah" ("anointed one," "Christ").

=== Son of God ===
Paul describes God as declaring Jesus to be the Son of God by raising him from the dead, and Sanders argues Mark portrays God as adopting Jesus as his son at his baptism, although others do not accept this interpretation of Mark. Sanders argues that for Jesus to be hailed as the Son of God does not necessarily mean that he is literally God's offspring. Rather, it indicates a very high designation, one who stands in a special relation to God. Sanders writes that Jesus believed himself to have full authority to speak and to act on God's behalf. Jesus asserted his own authority as something separate from any previously established authority based on his sense of personal connection with the deity.

In the Synoptic Gospels, the being of Jesus as "Son of God" corresponds exactly to the typical Hasidean from Galilee, a "pious" holy man that by God's intervention performs miracles and exorcisms.

=== Son of Man ===
The most literal translation of Son of Man is "Son of Humanity," or "human being." Jesus uses "Son of Man" to mean sometimes "I" or a mortal in general, sometimes a divine figure destined to suffer, and sometimes a heavenly figure of judgment soon to arrive. Jesus' usage of the term "Son of Man" in the first way is historical but without divine claim. The Son of Man as one destined to suffer seems to be, according to some, a Christian invention that does not go back to Jesus, and it is not clear whether Jesus meant himself when he spoke of the divine judge. These three uses do not appear together, such as the Son of Man who suffers and returns. Others maintain that Jesus' use of this phrase illustrates Jesus' self-understanding as the divine representative of God.

=== Other depictions ===
The title Logos, identifying Jesus as the divine word, first appears in the Gospel of John, written c. 90–100.

Raymond E. Brown concluded that the earliest Christians did not call Jesus, "God." Liberal New Testament scholars broadly agreed that Jesus did not make any implicit claims to be God. (See also Divinity of Jesus and Nontrinitarianism) However, quite a number of New Testament scholars today would defend the claim that, historically, Jesus did claim to be divine.

The gospels and Christian tradition depict Jesus as being executed at the insistence of Jewish leaders, who considered his claims to divinity to be blasphemous. (See also Responsibility for the death of Jesus) Fears that enthusiasm over Jesus might lead to Roman intervention is an alternate explanation for his arrest regardless of his preaching. "He was, perhaps, considered a destabilizing factor and removed as a precautionary measure."

== Jesus and John the Baptist ==
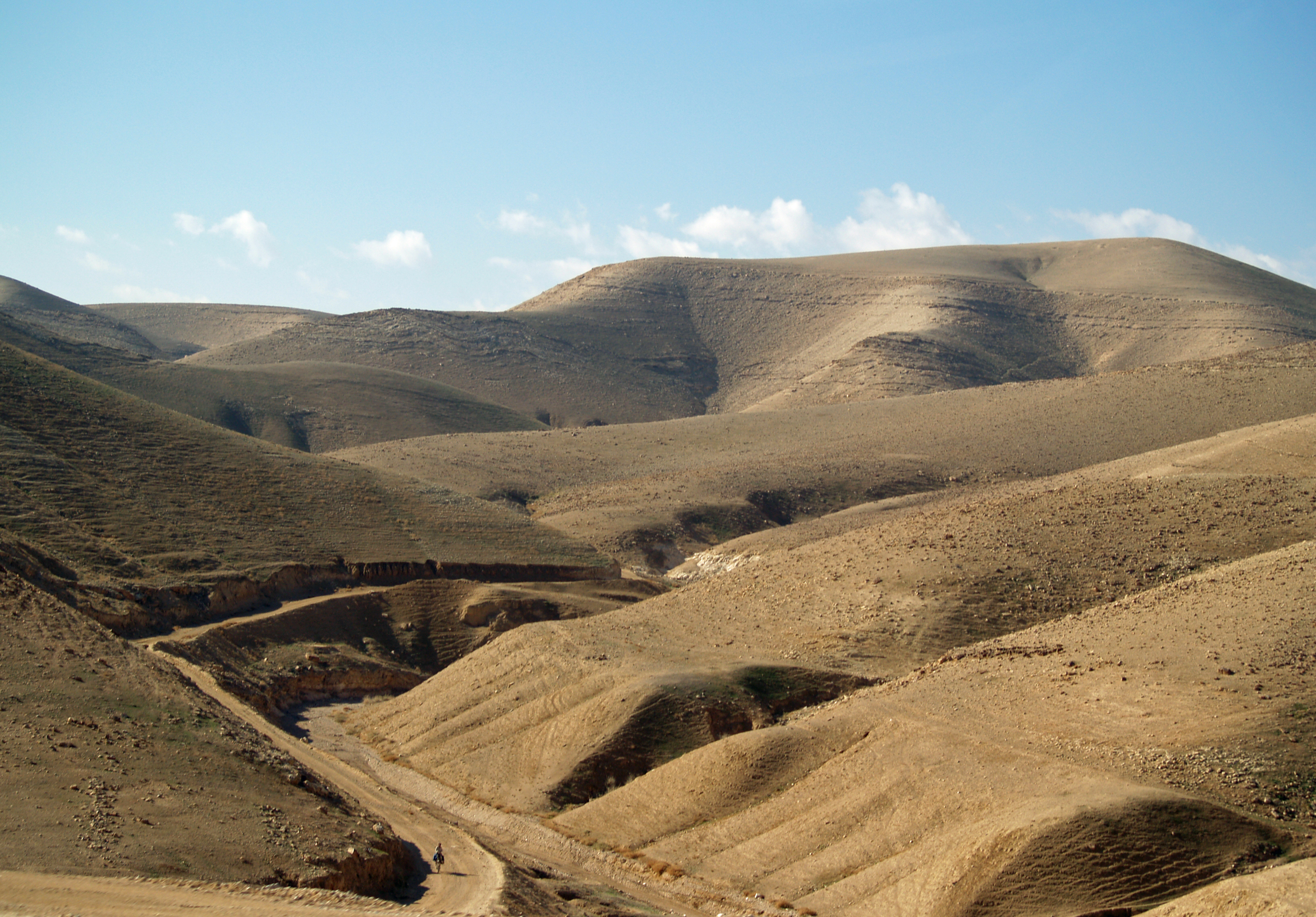
Judean hills of Israel

Jesus began preaching, teaching, and healing after he was baptized by John the Baptist, an apocalyptic ascetic preacher who called on Jews to repent.

Jesus was apparently a follower of John, a populist and activist prophet who looked forward to divine deliverance of the Jewish homeland from the Romans. John was a major religious figure, whose movement was probably larger than Jesus' own. Herod Antipas had John executed as a threat to his power. In a saying thought to have been originally recorded in Q, the historical Jesus defended John shortly after John's death.

John's followers formed a movement that continued after his death alongside Jesus' own following. Some of Jesus' followers were former followers of John the Baptist. Fasting and baptism, elements of John's preaching, may have entered early Christian practice as John's followers joined the movement.

Crossan portrays Jesus as rejecting John's apocalyptic eschatology in favor of a sapiential eschatology, in which cultural transformation results from humans' own actions, rather than from God's intervention.

Historians consider Jesus' baptism by John to be historical, an event that early Christians would not have included in their gospels in the absence of a "firm report." Like Jesus, John and his execution are mentioned by Josephus.

John the Baptist's prominence in both the gospels and Josephus suggests that he may have been more popular than Jesus in his lifetime; also, Jesus' mission does not begin until after his baptism by John.

Scholars posit that Jesus may have been a direct follower in John the Baptist's movement. Prominent Historical Jesus scholar John Dominic Crossan suggests that John the Baptist may have been killed for political reasons, not necessarily the personal grudge given in Mark's gospel.

== Ministry and teachings ==
The Synoptic Gospels agree that Jesus grew up in Nazareth, went to the River Jordan to meet and be baptised by the prophet John (Yohannan) the Baptist, and shortly after began healing and preaching to villagers and fishermen around the Sea of Galilee (which is actually a freshwater lake). Although there were many Phoenician, Hellenistic, and Roman cities nearby (e.g. Gerasa and Gadara; Sidon and Tyre; Sepphoris and Tiberias), there is only one account of Jesus healing someone in the region of the Gadarenes found in the three Synoptic Gospels (the demon called Legion), and another when he healed a Syro-Phoenician girl in the vicinity of Tyre and Sidon. The center of his work was Capernaum, a small town (about 500 by 350 meters, with a population of 1,500–2,000) where, according to the gospels, he appeared at the town's synagogue (a non-sacred meeting house where Jews would often gather on the Sabbath to study the Torah), healed a paralytic, and continued seeking disciples.(Matthew 4:13, 8:5, 11:23, 17:24Luke 4:31–36 and Mark 1:21–28

Once Jesus established a following (although there are debates over the number of followers), he moved towards the Davidic capital of the United Monarchy, the city of Jerusalem.

=== Length of ministry ===
Historians do not know how long Jesus preached. The Synoptic Gospels suggest one year, but there is some doubt since they are not written chronologically. The Gospel of John mentions three Passovers, and Jesus' ministry is traditionally said to have been three years long. Others claim that Jesus' ministry apparently lasted one year, possibly two.

=== Parables and paradoxes ===
Jesus taught in parables and aphorisms. A parable is a figurative image with a single message (sometimes mistaken for an analogy, in which each element has a metaphoric meaning). An aphorism is a short, memorable turn of phrase. In Jesus' case, aphorisms often involve some paradox or reversal. Authentic parables probably include the Good Samaritan and the Parable of the Workers in the Vineyard. Authentic aphorisms include "turn the other cheek," "go the second mile," and "love your enemies."

Crossan writes that Jesus' parables worked on multiple levels at the same time, provoking discussions with his peasant audience.

Jesus' parables and aphorisms circulated orally among his followers for years before they were written down and later incorporated into the gospels. They represent the earliest Christian traditions about Jesus.

=== Eschatology ===
Most of the scholars participating in the third quest hold that Jesus was an eschatological prophet believed in the imminent arrival of the kingdom of God. Simultaneously, some of these scholars tend to see Jesus's predictions as mistaken, while many others view it from the perspective of the conditional nature of judgement prophecy. This view, generally known as "consistent eschatology," was influential during the early to the mid—twentieth century. C. H. Dodd and others have insisted on a "realized eschatology" that says Jesus' own ministry fulfilled prophetic hopes. Multiple conservative scholars have adopted the paradoxical position the kingdom is both "present" and "still to come" claiming Pauline eschatology as support. R. T. France and N. T. Wright and others have taken Jesus' apocalyptic statements of an imminent end, historically, as referring to the fall of Jerusalem and the destruction of the Temple in 70 CE.

Disputed verses include the following:

- In Mark 9:1 Jesus says "there are some standing here who will not taste death until they see that the Kingdom of God has come in power." New Testament scholar D. C. Allison Jr. writes this verse may be taken to indicate the end was expected soon, but it may also be taken to refer to the Transfiguration, or the resurrection, or the destruction of Jerusalem with no certainty surrounding the issue.
- In Luke 21:35–36, Jesus urges constant, unremitting preparedness on the part of his followers. This can be seen in light of the imminence of the end of history and the final intervention of God. "Be alert at all times, praying to have strength to flee from all these things that are about to take place and to stand in the presence of the Son of Man." New Testament scholar Robert H. Stein says "all these things" in Luke 21:36 and in Mark 11:28 and in Mark 13:30 are identical phrases used 26 times in the New Testament; 24 of those all have the antecedent they refer to just before the expression itself. In these passages, that is the destruction of the Temple. "Do you see all these great buildings?” replied Jesus. “Not one stone here will be left on another; every one will be thrown down.”
- In Mark 13:24–27, 30, Jesus describes what will happen when the end comes, saying that "the sun will grow dark and the moon will not give its light, and the stars will be falling from heaven, and ... they will see the Son of Man coming on the clouds with great power and glory." He gives a timeline that is shrouded in ambiguity and debate: "Truly I tell you, this generation will not pass away before all these things take place" while in verse 32 it says "but about that day or hour no one knows." Mark 13 contains both imminence and delay throughout (Mark 13:2,29 and 13:24).
- The Apostle Paul might have shared this expectation of an imminent end. Toward the end of 1 Corinthians 7, he counsels the unmarried, writing, "I think that, in view of the impending crisis, it is well for you to remain as you are." "I mean, brothers and sisters, the appointed time has grown short ... For the present form of this world is passing away." (1 Corinthians 7:26, 29, 31) The theologian Geerhardus Vos writes that Paul's eschatology is of that paradoxical strain of the kingdom of God being both present and in the future. Paul repeatedly admonishes his readers to live in the present in total devotion as if every day were the future "last days" come to pass.

Robert W. Funk and colleagues, on the other hand, wrote that beginning in the 1970s, some scholars have come to reject the view of Jesus as eschatological, pointing out that he rejected the asceticism of John the Baptist and his eschatological message. In this view, the Kingdom of God is not a future state, but rather a contemporary, mysterious presence. Crossan describes Jesus' eschatology as based on establishing a new, holy way of life rather than on God's redeeming intervention in history.

Evidence for the Kingdom of God as already present derives from these verses.

- In Luke 17:20–21, Jesus says that one will not be able to observe God's Kingdom arriving, and that it "is right there in your presence."
- In Thomas 113, Jesus says that God's Kingdom "is spread out upon the earth, and people don't see it."
- In Luke 11:20, Jesus says that if he drives out demons by God's finger then "for you" the Kingdom of God has arrived.
- Furthermore, the major parables of Jesus do not reflect an apocalyptic view of history.

The Jesus Seminar concludes that apocalyptic statements attributed to Jesus could have originated from early Christians, as apocalyptic ideas were common, but the statements about God's Kingdom being mysteriously present cut against the common view and could have originated only with Jesus himself.

=== Laconic sage ===
The sage of the ancient Near East was a self-effacing man of few words who did not provoke encounters. A holy man offers cures and exorcisms only when petitioned, and even then may be reluctant. Jesus seems to have displayed a similar style.

The gospels present Jesus engaging in frequent "question and answer" religious debates with Pharisees and Sadducees. The Jesus Seminar believes the debates about scripture and doctrine are rabbinic in style and not characteristic of Jesus. They believe these "conflict stories" represent the conflicts between the early Christian community and those around them: the Pharisees, Sadducees, etc. The group believes these sometimes include genuine sayings or concepts but are largely the product of the early Christian community.

=== Table fellowship ===
Open table fellowship with outsiders was central to Jesus' ministry. His practice of eating with the lowly people that he healed defied the expectations of traditional Jewish society. He presumably taught at the meal, as would be expected in a symposium. His conduct caused enough of a scandal that he was accused of being a glutton and a drunk.

Crossan identifies this table practice as part of Jesus' radical egalitarian program. The importance of table fellowship is seen in the prevalence of meal scenes in early Christian art and in the Eucharist, the Christian ritual of bread and wine.

=== Disciples ===
Jesus recruited twelve Galilean peasants as his inner circle, including several fishermen. The fishermen in question and the tax collector Matthew would have business dealings requiring some knowledge of Greek. The father of two of the fishermen is represented as having the means to hire labourers for his fishing business, and tax collectors were seen as exploiters. The twelve were expected to rule the twelve tribes of Israel in the Kingdom of God.

The disciples of Jesus play a large role in the search for the historical Jesus. However, the four gospels use different words to apply to Jesus' followers. The Greek word ochloi refers to the crowds who gathered around Jesus as he preached. The word mathetes refers to the followers who remained for more teaching. The word apostolos refers to the twelve disciples, or apostles, whom Jesus chose specifically to be his close followers. With these three categories of followers, John P. Meier uses a model of concentric circles around Jesus, with an inner circle of true disciples, a larger circle of followers, and an even larger circle of those who gathered to listen to him.

Jesus controversially accepted women and sinners (those who violated purity laws) among his followers. Even though women were never directly called "disciples," certain passages in the gospels seem to indicate that women followers of Jesus were equivalent to the disciples. It was possible for members of the ochloi to cross over into the mathetes category. However, Meier argues that some people from the mathetes category actually crossed into the apostolos category, namely Mary Magdalene. The narration of Jesus' death and the events that accompany it mention the presence of women. Meier states that the pivotal role of the women at the cross is revealed in the subsequent narrative, where at least some of the women, notably Mary Magdalene, witnessed both the burial of Jesus (Mark 15:47) and discovered the empty tomb (Mark 16:1–8). Luke also mentions that as Jesus and the Twelve were travelling from city to city preaching the "good news," they were accompanied by women, who provided for them out of their own means. We can conclude that women did follow Jesus a considerable length of time during his Galilean ministry and his last journey to Jerusalem. Such a devoted, long-term following could not occur without the initiative or active acceptance of the women who followed him. In name, the women are not historically considered "disciples" of Jesus, but the fact that he allowed them to follow and serve him proves that they were to some extent treated as disciples.

The gospels recount Jesus commissioning disciples to spread the word, sometimes during his life (e.g., Mark 6:7–12) and sometimes during a resurrection appearance (e.g., Matthew 28:18–20). These accounts reflect early Christian practice as well as Jesus' original instructions, though some scholars contend that the historical Jesus issued no such missionary commission.

According to John Dominic Crossan, Jesus sent his disciples out to heal and to proclaim the Kingdom of God. They were to eat with those they healed rather than with higher status people who might well be honored to host a healer, and Jesus directed them to eat whatever was offered them. This implicit challenge to the social hierarchy was part of Jesus' program of radical egalitarianism. These themes of healing and eating are common in early Christian art.

Jesus' instructions to the missionaries appear in the Synoptic Gospels and in the Gospel of Thomas. These instructions are distinct from the commission that the resurrected Jesus gives to his followers, the Great Commission, text rated as black (inauthentic) by the Jesus Seminar.

=== Asceticism ===
The fellows of the Jesus Seminar mostly held that Jesus was not an ascetic, and that he probably drank wine and did not fast, other than as all observant Jews did. He did, however, promote a simple life and the renunciation of wealth.

Jesus said that some made themselves "eunuchs" for the Kingdom of Heaven (Matthew 19:12). This aphorism might have been meant to establish solidarity with eunuchs, who were considered "incomplete" in Jewish society. Alternatively, he may have been promoting celibacy.

Some suggest that Jesus was married to Mary Magdalene, or that he probably had a special relationship with her. However, Ehrman notes the conjectural nature of these claims as "not a single one of our ancient sources indicates that Jesus was married, let alone married to Mary Magdalene."

John the Baptist was an ascetic and perhaps a Nazirite, who promoted celibacy like the Essenes. Ascetic elements, such as fasting, appeared in Early Christianity and are mentioned by Matthew during Jesus' discourse on ostentation. It has been suggested that James, the brother of Jesus and leader of the Jerusalem community till 62, was a Nazirite.

== Jerusalem ==
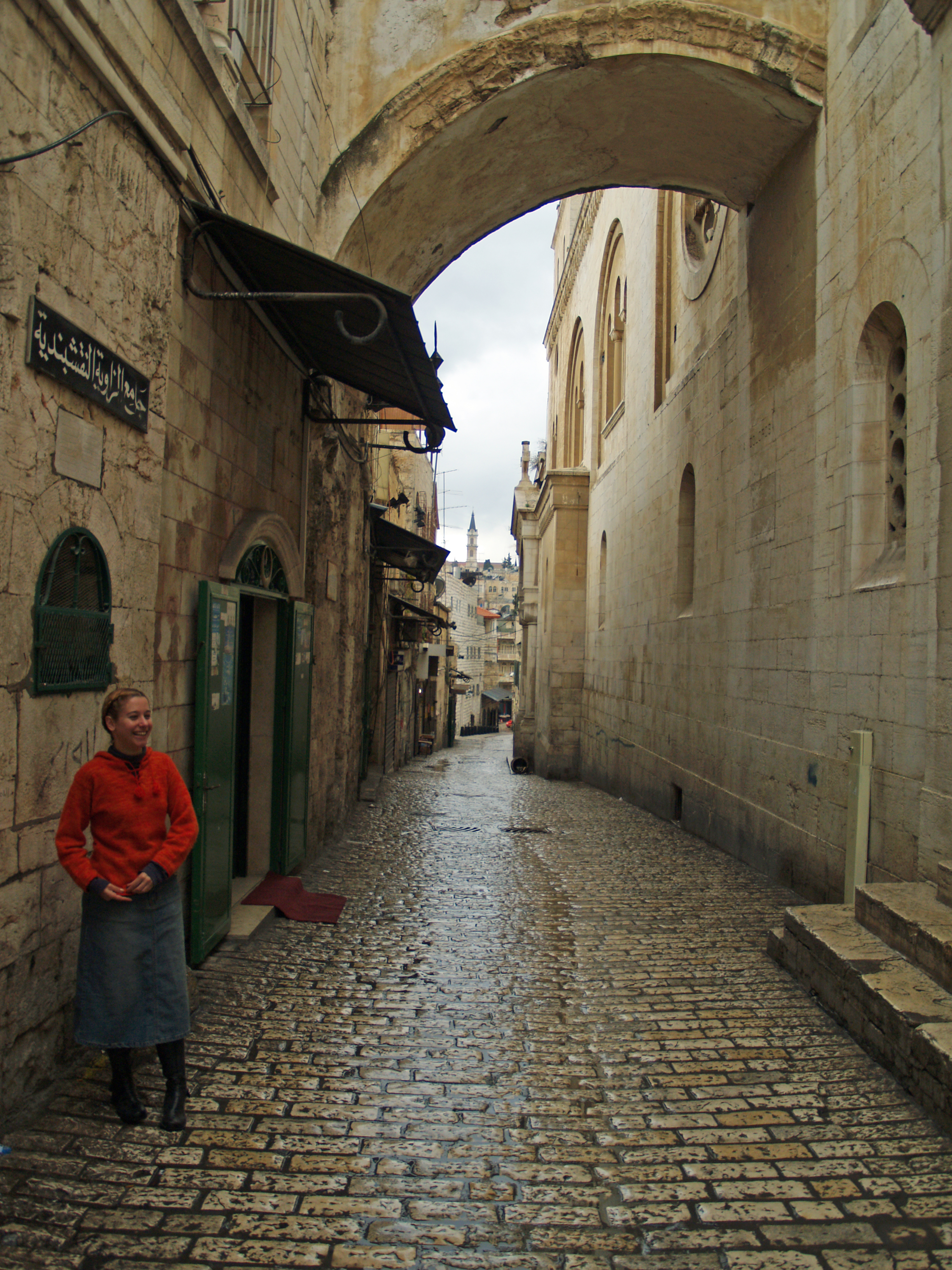
The narrow streets of Via Dolorosa, Jerusalem.

Jesus and his followers left Galilee and traveled to Jerusalem in Judea. They may have traveled through Samaria as reported in John, or around the border of Samaria as reported in Luke, as was common practice for Jews avoiding hostile Samaritans. Jerusalem was packed with Jews who had come for Passover, perhaps comprising 300,000 to 400,000 pilgrims.

=== Entrance to Jerusalem ===
Jesus might have entered Jerusalem on a donkey as a symbolic act, possibly to contrast with the triumphant entry that a Roman conqueror would make, or to enact a prophecy in Zechariah. Christian scripture makes the reference to Zechariah explicit, perhaps because the scene was invented as scribes looked to scripture to help them flesh out the details of the gospel narratives.

=== Temple disturbance ===
According to the gospel accounts Jesus taught in Jerusalem, and he caused a disturbance at the Temple. In response, the temple authorities arrested him and turned him over to the Roman authorities for execution. He might have been betrayed into the hands of the temple police, but Funk suggests the authorities might have arrested him with no need for a traitor.

== Crucifixion ==
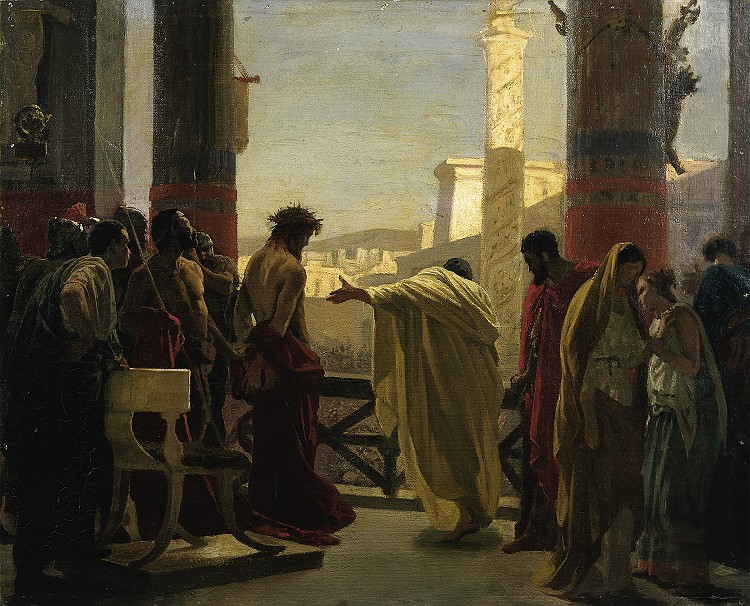
Depiction of Ecce Homo, as Pontius Pilate delivers Jesus to the crowd. Antonio Ciseri, 1862

Jesus was crucified by Pontius Pilate, the Prefect of Iudaea province (26 to 36 AD). Some scholars suggest that Pilate executed Jesus as a public nuisance, perhaps with the cooperation of the Jewish authorities. Jesus' cleansing of the Temple may well have seriously offended his Jewish audience, leading to his death; while Bart D. Ehrman argued that Jesus' actions would have been considered treasonous and thus a capital offense by the Romans. The claim that the Sadducee high-priestly leaders and their associates handed Jesus over to the Romans is strongly attested. Historians debate whether Jesus intended to be crucified.

The Jesus Seminar argued that Christian scribes seem to have drawn on scripture in order to flesh out the passion narrative, such as inventing Jesus' trial. However, scholars are split on the historicity of the underlying events.

John Dominic Crossan points to the use of the word "kingdom" in his central teachings of the "Kingdom of God," which alone would have brought Jesus to the attention of Roman authority. Rome dealt with Jesus as it commonly did with essentially non-violent dissension: the killing of its leader. It was usually violent uprisings such as those during the Roman–Jewish Wars that warranted the slaughter of leader and followers. The fact that the Romans thought removing the head of the Christian movement was enough suggests that the disciples were not organised for violent resistance, and that Jesus' crucifixion was considered a largely preventative measure. As the balance shifted in the early Church from the Jewish community to Gentile converts, it may have sought to distance itself from rebellious Jews (those who rose up against the Roman occupation). There was also a schism developing within the Jewish community as these believers in Jesus were pushed out of the synagogues after the Roman destruction of the Second Temple in 70 CE (see Council of Jamnia). The divergent accounts of Jewish involvement in the trial of Jesus suggest some of the unfavorable sentiments between such Jews that resulted. See also List of events in early Christianity.

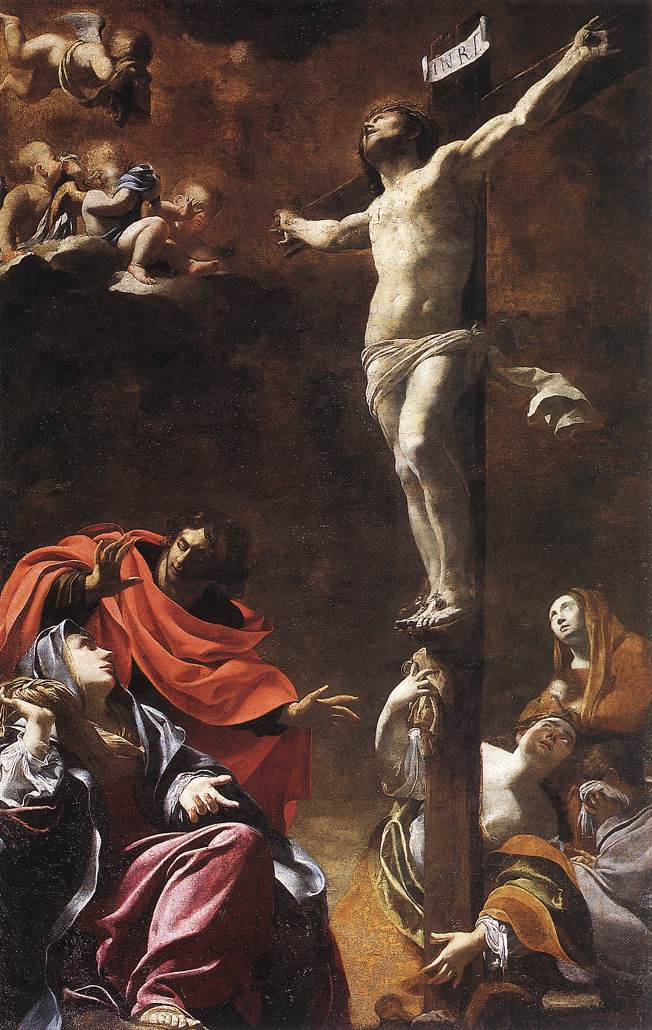
The Crucifixion (1622) by Simon Vouet; Church of Jesus, Genoa

Aside from the fact that the gospels provide different accounts of the Jewish role in Jesus's death (for example, Mark and Matthew report two separate trials, Luke one, and John none), Fredriksen, like other scholars (see Catchpole 1971) argues that multiple elements of the gospel accounts could not possibly have happened: according to Jewish law, the court could not meet at night; it could not meet on a major holiday; Jesus's statements to the Sanhedrin or the High Priest (e.g. that he was the messiah) did not constitute blasphemy; the charges that the gospels purport the Jews to have made against Jesus were not capital crimes against Jewish law; even if Jesus had been accused and found guilty of a capital offense by the Sanhedrin, the punishment would have been death by stoning (the fates of Saint Stephen and James the Just for example) and not crucifixion. This necessarily assumes that the Jewish leaders were scrupulously obedient to Roman law, and never broke their own laws, customs or traditions even for their own advantage. In response, it has been argued that the legal circumstances surrounding the trial have not been well understood, and that Jewish leaders were not always strictly obedient, either to Roman law or to their own. Furthermore, talk of a restoration of the Jewish monarchy was seditious under Roman occupation. Further, Jesus would have entered Jerusalem at an especially risky time, during Passover, when popular emotions were running high. Although most Jews did not have the means to travel to Jerusalem for every holiday, virtually all tried to comply with these laws as best they could. And during these festivals, such as the Passover, the population of Jerusalem would swell, and outbreaks of violence were common. Scholars suggest that the High Priest feared that Jesus' talk of an imminent restoration of an independent Jewish state might spark a riot. Maintaining the peace was one of the primary jobs of the Roman-appointed High Priest, who was personally responsible to them for any major outbreak. Scholars therefore argue that he would have arrested Jesus for promoting sedition and rebellion, and turned him over to the Romans for punishment.

Both the gospel accounts and [the] Pauline interpolation [found at 1 Thes 2:14–16] were composed in the interval immediately following the terrible war of 66–73. The Church had every reason to assure prospective Gentile audiences that the Christian movement neither threatened nor challenged imperial sovereignty, despite the fact that their founder had himself been crucified, that is, executed as a rebel.

However, Paul's preaching of the gospel and its radical social practices were by their very definition a direct affront to the social hierarchy of Greco-Roman society itself, and thus these new teachings undermined the Empire, ultimately leading to full-scale Roman persecution of Christians aimed at stamping out the new faith.

== Burial and Empty Tomb ==
Craig A. Evans contends that, "the literary, historical and archaeological evidence points in one direction: that the body of Jesus was placed in a tomb, according to Jewish custom."

John Dominic Crossan, based on his unique position that the Gospel of Peter contains the oldest primary source about Jesus, argued that the burial accounts become progressively extravagant and thus found it historically unlikely that an enemy would release a corpse, contending that Jesus' followers did not have the means to know what happened to Jesus' body. Crossan's position on the Gospel of Peter has not found scholarly support, from Meyer's description of it as "eccentric and implausible," to Koester's critique of it as "seriously flawed." Habermas argued against Crossan, stating that the response of Jewish authorities against Christian claims for the resurrection presupposed a burial and empty tomb, and he observed the discovery of the body of Yohanan Ben Ha'galgol, a man who died by crucifixion in the first century and was discovered at a burial site outside ancient Jerusalem in an ossuary, arguing that this find revealed important facts about crucifixion and burial in first century Palestine.

Other scholars consider the burial by Joseph of Arimathea found in Mark 15 to be historically probable, and some have gone on to argue that the tomb was thereafter discovered empty. More positively, Mark Waterman maintains the Empty Tomb priority over the Appearances. Michael Grant wrote:

[I]f we apply the same sort of criteria that we would apply to any other ancient literary sources, then the evidence is firm and plausible enough to necessitate the conclusion that the tomb was indeed found empty.

However, Marcus Borg notes:

the first reference to the empty tomb story is rather odd: Mark, writing around 70 CE, tells us that some women found the tomb empty but told no one about it. Some scholars think this indicates that the story of the empty tomb is a late development and that the way Mark tells it explains why it was not widely (or previously) known

Scholars Gerd Theissen and Annette Merz conclude that "the empty tomb can only be illuminated by the Easter faith (which is based on appearances); the Easter faith cannot be illuminated by the empty tomb."

Ancient historian Gaetano De Sanctis and legal historian Leopold Wenger, writing in the early 20th century, stated that the empty tomb of Jesus was historically real because of evidence from the Nazareth Inscription.

== Resurrection appearances ==
The Incredulity of Saint Thomas by Caravaggio (16th century), depicts the resurrected Jesus.

Paul, Mary Magdalene, the Apostles, and others believed they had seen the risen Jesus. Paul recorded his experience in an epistle and lists other reported appearances. The original Mark reports Jesus' empty tomb, and the later gospels and later endings to Mark narrate various resurrection appearances.

Scholars have put forth a number of theories concerning the resurrection appearances of Jesus. Christian scholars such as Dale Allison, William Lane Craig, Gary Habermas, and N. T. Wright conclude that Jesus did in fact rise from the dead. The Jesus Seminar states: "In the view of the Seminar, he did not rise bodily from the dead; the resurrection is based instead on visionary experiences of Peter, Paul, and Mary [Magdalene]." E.P. Sanders argues for the difficulty of accusing the early witnesses of any deliberate fraud:

It is difficult to accuse these sources, or the first believers, of deliberate fraud. A plot to foster belief in the Resurrection would probably have resulted in a more consistent story. Instead, there seems to have been a competition: 'I saw him,' 'so did I,' 'the women saw him first,' 'no, I did; they didn't see him at all,' and so on. Moreover, some of the witnesses of the Resurrection would give their lives for their belief. This also makes fraud unlikely.

Most Post-Enlightenment historians believe supernatural events cannot be reconstructed using empirical methods, and thus consider the resurrection a non-historical question but instead a philosophical or theological question.

== See also ==
- Historical Jesus
- Quest for the historical Jesus
