= Jesus the Proletarian =

1950 novel by Zhu Weizhi

Wuchan zhe yesu zhuan (無產者耶穌傅), translated into English as Jesus the Proletarian, is a Chinese historical novel based on the life of Jesus. It was written by biblical scholar Zhu Weizhi and published in 1950.

== Contents ==
Zhu remarks in the preface that he wrote Jesus the Proletarian to dispel all "undignified misinterpretations of Jesus which have accumulated over the years and to reveal the real Jesus: a man of humble origins born into a working class family." Marxist terminology features prominently in Jesus the Proletarian; for instance, the term "proletariat" appears 55 times while "exploitation" appears 23 times.

== Publication history ==
In a 1935 essay, Zhu Weizhi—both a pious Protestant and a fervent nationalist—wrote that "Jesus was a leader of great integrity who led the proletarian masses in the struggle against Roman imperialism." In 1948, two years before the publication of the book, Zhu had already written a biography of Jesus simply titled Yesu jidu (耶穌基督) or Jesus Christ. However, having regretted his not presenting Jesus from a "proletarian viewpoint" in his earlier work, he decided to write another novel on Jesus, this time with Marxist undertones.

In writing Wuchan zhe yesu zhuan (無產者耶穌傅) or Jesus the Proletarian, Zhu was greatly influenced by "On the History of Early Christianity" by Friedrich Engels and Foundations of Christianity by Karl Kautsky. He also found inspiration in texts like The Proletarian Gospel of Galilee by F. Hebert Stead; The Days of His Flesh by Magee College theologian David Smith; The Call of the Carpenter by Bouck White; and Musansha Iesu (無産者イエス) by Japanese socialist and Congregationalist minister Naozo Yonezawa. Moreover, the collapse of the Kuomintang and the rise of the Chinese Communist Party allegedly enabled Zhu to "see more clearly" that Jesus was a proletarian.

== Critical reception ==
Chin Ken Pa describes Jesus the Proletarian as "one of the two main works on Christian socialism in China", together with The Revolutionary Carpenter by Zhang Shizhang (張仕章).
