= Annette Merz =

German theologian

Annette Brigitte Merz (born 1 December 1965, Frankfurt am Main) is a German Protestant theologian and biblical scholar, on the faculty of the University of Utrecht. Merz has conducted vigorous research into the historicity of Jesus and is best known for her 1996 book with Gerd Theissen, The Historical Jesus, a widely used textbook translated into six languages. In the book, Merz and Theissen "assert that the Christian sources portray both positive and negative assessments of temple sacrifice and that Jesus, near the end of his life, deliberately created a rite to displace such sacrifices" and argue that "significant sayings of Jesus indicate a critical attitude towards the temple cult." They also argue that "God's kingdom is the establishment of his ethical will, the kingdom is to be understood dynamically as rule. But the "kingdom of God" is not an end in itself", and also examine "five of the most important differences” between Jesus and John. In the 16th and final chapter they examine the historical Jesus and the beginnings of Christology.

In 2007, she and several other scholars published Kompendium der Gleichnisse Jesu, a major volume on the parables of Jesus. In 2012 she was due to publish Kompendium der frühchristlichen Wundererzählungen, another extensive volume which documents the miracles of Jesus.

Since 2014 Merz has served as Professor of New Testament at the Protestant Theological University, Groningen and Research Associate Professor (30%) at the University of Tilburg, Tilburg School of Catholic Theology.
