= Zhu Weizhi =

Chinese Christian theologian and writer (1905–99)

- 朱维之
- Born: 26 May 1905; Wenzhou, Zhejiang, China
- Died: 1999 (aged 93–94)
- Education: Nanjing Theological Seminary
- Occupation(s): Christian theologian, author

Zhu Weizhi (simplified Chinese: 朱维之; traditional Chinese: 朱維之; pinyin: Zhū Wéizhī; 26 May 1905 – 1999), also known as W. T. Chu, was a Chinese theologian and author. He was born to a Christian family in Wenzhou, Zhejiang and was raised as a Protestant. Known for his contributions to biblical studies in China, his 1941 book Christianity and Literature was one of the earliest Chinese publications to examine the relationship between Christianity and literature. He also authored several essays on Christianity, alongside two biographies of Jesus, titled Jesus Christ (1948) and Jesus the Proletarian (1950). He spent his later years in Shanghai and Tianjin.

== Early life ==
Zhu Weizhi was born on 26 May 1905 in a village in Wenzhou, Zhejiang. His parents being Protestant converts, Zhu was exposed to Christianity from a young age. He attended the local China Inland Mission boarding school for his primary education and graduated from the Nanjing Theological Seminary in 1927. He was as much of a nationalist as he was a devout Christian, and spent his college days studying both the Bible—particularly the Old Testament and its poetry—and ancient Chinese classics by the likes of Li Bai, Mozi, and Qu Yuan. At the age of 14, Zhu participated in the May Fourth Movement by rebelling in school and "banning and burning Japanese goods". In 1925, he wrote his very first essay on the Bible from a literary standpoint, titled "The Bible and Literature". In 1927, he joined the North Expedition army's General Political Department, during which time he was introduced to and greatly taken in by The Communist Manifesto.

== Career ==
Zhu left the army after less than a year and joined the Association Press of China as an editor and translator. He subsequently spent about five years teaching Chinese New Literature at the Fujian Christian University, and had a short residence at the Tokyo-based Chuo University and Waseda University in the early part of his teaching career. In 1941, his book Jidujiao yu wenxue (基督教与文学) or Christianity and Literature was published; it was one of the earliest Chinese publications to examine the relationship between Christianity and literature. In Jesus the Proletarian (1950), which was written on the heels of his first biography of Jesus, Jesus Christ (1948), Zhu argues that Jesus was not only a "real proletarian", being the son of a carpenter, but also "a revolutionary and enemy of Roman imperialism". Zhu lectured at the University of Shanghai for sixteen years until 1952, when he was reassigned to the Tianjin-based Nankai University.

During the Cultural Revolution, his time as a biblical scholar took a pause, but he reemerged in 1980 with two essays, "Xibolai wenxue jianjue – Xiang Jiu yue quanshu wenxue tanxian" (希伯来文学简介 – 向 旧约全书 文学探险) or "A Brief Introduction to Hebrew Literature – A Literary Exploration of the Old Testament" and "Shengjing wenxue de diwei he tezhi" (《圣经》文学的地位和特质) or "The Literary Position and Characteristics of the Bible". Published in 1989, Zhu's Shengjing wenxue shier jiang (圣经文学十二讲) or Twelve Lectures on the Bible, was the first book on the Bible published after the Cultural Revolution. Zhu died in 1999.

== Legacy ==
Zhu is described by Marián Gálik as "the father of the study of Christian Literature including the Bible in 20th century China". Roman Malek claims that he was "one of the most important scholars reintroducing the literary Bible into China"; his 1980 essay Xibolai wenxue jianjue is credited by Liu Ping with "(opening) a gap for Old Testament studies that had been suspended for nearly three decades."
