= David Kaylor =

American scholar (1933–2022)

R. David Kaylor
- Born: October 1, 1933; New Market, Alabama, U.S.
- Died: April 20, 2022 (aged 88)
- Title: James Sprunt Professor of Religion

Academic background
- Education: Duke University
- Thesis: The Ascension Motif in Luke-Acts, the Epistle to the Hebrews, and the Fourth Gospel (1964)

Academic work
- Institutions: Davidson College
- Notable works: Jesus the Prophet: His Vision of the Kingdom on Earth

Robert David Kaylor (October 1, 1933 – April 20, 2022) was an American New Testament scholar who was James Sprunt Professor of Religion at Davidson College. Born in New Market, Alabama, he obtained his PhD at Duke University. Kaylor died on April 20, 2022, at the age of 88.

In his book, Jesus the Prophet: His Vision of the Kingdom on Earth, Kaylor argues that Jesus was a social and political reformer who was driven by a desire to return a supposed pre-monarchical egalitarianism.

== Works ==
=== Thesis ===
- Kaylor, R. David (1964). The Ascension Motif in Luke-Acts, the Epistle to the Hebrews, and the Fourth Gospel (Ph.D.). Duke University. OCLC 12495285.

=== Books ===
- ———; Venkatachari, K. K. A. (1981). God far, God near: an interpretation of the thought of Nammāl̲vār. Ananthacharya Indological Research institute series (Supplement). Vol. 5. Bombay: Ananthacharya Indological Research Institute. OCLC 17380213.
- ——— (1988). Paul's Covenant Community: Jew and Gentile in Romans. Atlanta, GA: John Knox Press. ISBN 9780804202206. OCLC 17775652.
- ——— (1994). Jesus the Prophet: His Vision of the Kingdom on Earth. Louisville, KY: Westminster/John Knox Press. ISBN 9780664255053. OCLC 28723449.
- ——— (1994). Who is the Christ?: as answered in the Epistles. Horizons Bible study, 1994-95. Louisville, KY: Horizons, for Presbyterian Women, Presbyterian Church (USA). OCLC 30491495.
