= Gerd Theissen =

German Protestant theologian and biblical scholar (born 1943)

- Born: 24 April 1943 (age 83); Rheydt, Germany

Academic background
- Education: University of Bonn

Academic work
- Discipline: sociology; theology; history
- Institutions: University of Heidelberg
- Main interests: New Testament

Gerd Theissen (Theißen, born 24 April 1943) is a German Protestant theologian and New Testament scholar. He is professor emeritus of new testament studies at the University of Heidelberg.

== Early life and education ==
Gerd Theissen (spelling in German, Theißen) was born in Rheydt, Germany, today known as Mönchengladbach, Germany, on 24 April 1943.

He obtained his doctorate from the University of Bonn in 1968, in a study of the New Testament Epistle to the Hebrews, study under the auspices of the faculty of Protestant theology. He then moved on to studying Evangelical Theology there, as well, obtaining his habilitation in 1972, on early Christian miracle stories, which he approached through form criticism.

== Career ==
=== Positions ===
Thiessen is reported to have been a lecturer at the University of Bonn from 1973 to 1978. As described by a colleague on the occasion of an honorary doctorate, Thiessen worked "as a secondary school teacher, teaching religion and German language" from 1976 to 1978.

He served as a professor of the New Testament at the University of Copenhagen, from 1978 to 1980. In 1980 he became a professor of "New Testament studies" at the University of Heidelberg, a post which he held for over 25 years.

From 2007 to September 2009 Thiessen served as secretary of the Philosophical class of the Heidelberg Academy of Sciences.

=== Work ===
Theissen is a German Protestant theologian and New Testament scholar. His academic work, as of 2005, was being described as covering "wide fields in New Testament studies" through publication of 15 sole-author books, co-authoring of 3 more, as well as contributing 110 articles (including reviews), chapters, or essays in lexicons, books, and journals. His works have been translated into more than ten languages, European and Asian.

== Awards and recognition ==
In 2002, Thiessen was awarded the Burkitt Medal by the British Academy. It is granted "in recognition of special service to Biblical Studies". The British Academy's citation states that Theissen is:

...one of the earliest pioneers in the application of the principles and methods of sociology to the study of the New Testament. [His n]otable works in this field are The First Followers of Jesus... [1977] (which concentrated on conditions in Palestine) and The Social Setting of Primitive [sic., Pauline] Christianity [1979] (a Pauline study dealing mainly with Corinth).

The citation goes on to state that he "is not simply a sociologist... [but] has never ceased to be a theologian... always emphasis[ing] the theological... [and] historical significance of his sociological studies", and that Thiessen had written, specifically, about the "meaning of faith" where it noted his work, On Having a Critical Faith (1979), was "particularly important". It goes on to highlight his most recent publications as of 2002, which included The Religion of the Earliest Churches (1999) and Gospel Writing and Church Politics (2001), and makes special reference to The Shadow of the Galilean (1986), which it describes as "a most unusual life of Jesus, accessible to any intelligent reader, but based on the strictest critical discipline".

He has been awarded honorary doctoral degrees, including from The University of Glasgow in 1990, and the University of St. Andrews in 1997. In 2005, Thiessen was awarded an honorary doctorate (doctor honoris causa) by the Faculty of Theology of the Károli Gáspár University of the Reformed Church in Hungary, during festivities to celebrate its 150th jubilee.

Professor Theissen is a member of the Heidelberger Akademie der Wissenschaften.

== Personal life ==
As of 2005, Theissen was married to psychologist and psychotherapist Christa Schaible, and they had two children.

== Bibliography ==
The following are books, in German and in English, by Theissen:

Books translated in English

- The Miracle Stories of the Early Christian Tradition (1974), Fortress Press, 1983, ISBN 0-8006-6205-9
- Sociology of Early Palestinian Christianity (1977), Fortress Press, 1978, ISBN 0-8006-1330-9
  - also published as: The First Followers of Jesus: A Sociological Analysis of the Earliest Christianity (1977), SCM Press, 1978, ISBN 0-334-00479-9
- A Critical Faith: A Case for Religion (1978), Philadelphia: Fortress Press, 1979, ISBN 0-8006-1373-2
  - also published as: On having a Critical Faith, London: SCM Press 1979
- The Social Setting of Pauline Christianity: Essays on Corinth (1979), Philadelphia: Fortress Press 1982 (reprint: Wipf & Stock, 2004), ISBN 1-59244-871-2
  - also published as: The Social Reality and the Early Christians: Theology, Ethics and the World of the New Testament (1979), Minneapolis: Fortress 1992 (reprint T. & T. Clark, 1999), ISBN 0-567-09618-1
- Psychological Aspects of Pauline Theology (1983), Philadelphia: Fortress Press 1987 (reprint: T. & T. Clark, 1999, ISBN 0-567-09479-0
- Biblical Faith: An Evolutionary Approach (1984), Fortress Press, 1985, ISBN 0-8006-1842-4
- The Shadow of the Galilean: The Quest of the Historical Jesus in Narrative Form (1986), Fortress Press, 1987; Updated edition 2007, ISBN 0-8006-3900-6.
- The Gospels in Context: Social and Political History in the Synoptic Tradition (1989), Minneapolis: Fortress 1991 (reprint: T. & T. Clark, 1999), ISBN 0-567-29602-4
- The Open Door: Variations on Biblical Theme (1990), Fortress Press, 1991, ISBN 0-8006-2561-7
- The Sign Language of Faith. Opportunities for Preaching Today (1994), SCM Press, 1995, ISBN 978-0-334-02598-6
- Traces of Light: Sermons and Bible Studies (1994), SCM Press, 1996, ISBN 0-334-02629-6
- Gerd Theissen, Annette Merz, The Historical Jesus: A Comprehensive Guide (1996), Augsburg Fortress, 1998, ISBN 0-8006-3122-6
- Gerd Theissen, Dagmar Winter, The Quest for the Plausible Jesus: The Question of Criteria (1997), Westminster John Knox Press, 2002, ISBN 0-664-22537-3
- Signs of Life (1998), SCM Press, 1998, ISBN 978-0-334-02757-7
- The Religion of the Earliest Churches: Creating a Symbolic World (1999), Fortress Press, 1999, ISBN 0-8006-3179-X
- A Theory of Primitive Christian Religion (2000), SCM Press, 1999, ISBN 0-334-02913-9
- Gospel Writing and Church Politics: A Socio-rhetorical Approach (Chuen King Lecture Series - CKLS 3 Chung Chi College: The Chinese University of Hong Kong), 2001 ISBN 962-7137-29-4
- The New Testament: History, Literature, Religion (2002), T & T Clark, 2003, ISBN 0-567-08949-5
- Wolfgang Stegemann, Bruce J. Malina, Gerd Theissen (eds.), The Social Setting of Jesus and the Gospels, Fortress Press, 2002, ISBN 978-0-8006-3452-0
- The Bible and Contemporary Culture (2003), Fortress Press, 2007, ISBN 0-8006-3863-8
- The New Testament: A Literary History (2007), Fortress Press, 2011, ISBN 978-0-8006-9785-3

Books not translated

- Untersuchungen zum Hebräerbrief, Gütersloh: Mohn, 1969
- Jesus als historische Gestalt. Beiträge zur Jesusforschung, Göttingen: Vandenhoeck, 2003
- Gerd Theissen, P.v. Gemünden, M. Konradt, Der Jakobusbrief. Beiträge zur Rehabilitierung der „strohernen Epistel“ , Münster: LIT, 2003
- Die Jesusbewegung. Sozialgeschichte einer Revolution der Werte, Gütersloh: Kaiser, 2004
- Erleben und Verhalten der ersten Christen. Eine Psychologie des Urchristentums, Gütersloh: Gütersloher Verlagshaus, 2007
- "Regards psychologiques et sociologiques sur le christianisme primitif: cinq études de Gerd Theissen", Études théologiques et religieuses 83 (2008)
- "Neutestamentliche Wissenschaft vor und nach 1945: Karl Georg Kuhn und Günther Bornkamm", Schriften der Philosophisch-historischen Klasse der Heidelberger Akademie der Wissenschaften 47, Heidelberg: Winter, 2009
- "Von Jesus zur urchristlichen Zeichenwelt", "Neutestamentliche Grenzgänge“ im Dialog, Göttingen: Vandenhoeck, 2011
- Die Ritualdynamik urchristlicher Sakramente. Von prophetischen Zeichenhandlungen zu geheimnisvollen Riten, = La dinamica rituale dei sacramenti nel cristianesimo primitivo. Da azioni simbolico profetiche a riti misterici, Lectiones Vagagginianae IV, Rom: Cittadella Editrice e Pontificio Ateneo Sant'Anselmo, 2013
- Polyphones Verstehen. Entwürfe zur Bibelhermeneutik, Münster: LIT, 2014
- Transparente Erfahrung: Predigten und Meditationen, Gütersloh, Gütersloher Verlagshaus 2014
- Polyphones Verstehen: Entwürfe zur Bibelhermeneutik, Münster: LIT, 2015
- Gerd Theissen, Petra von Gemünden, Der Römerbrief. Rechenschaft eines Reformators, Göttingen: Vandenhoeck 2016
- Gerd Theissen, Lung Pun Chan, István Czachesz, Kontraintuitivität und Paradoxie. Zum kognitiven Ansatz in der Exegese, BVB 29, Münster: LIT 2017
- Veränderungspräsenz und Tabubruch. Die Ritualdynamik urchristlicher Sakramente, BVB 30, Münster: LIT 2017
- Der Anwalt des Paulus, Gütersloh, Gütersloher Verlagshaus 2017
- Glaubenssätze: ein kritischer Katechismus, Gütersloh, Gütersloher Verlagshaus 2018
- Texttranszendenz, Beiträge zur polyphonen Hermeneutik, Münster: LIT 2019
- Urchristliche Wundergeschichten: ein Beitrag zur formgeschichtlichen Erforschung der synoptischen Evangelien, Gütersloh, Gütersloher Verlagshaus 2019
- Beiträge zu einer polyphonen Bibelhermeneutik, Münster: LIT 2019
- Religionskritik als Religionsdiskurs: Plädoyer für einen postsäkularen Dialog, Stuttgart: Alfred Kröner Verlag 2020
- Resonanztheologie: Gott, Christus, Geist, Münster: LIT 2020
- Gerd Theissen, Sylvia Thonak, Militärseelsorge: das ungeliebte Kind protestantischer Friedensethik? : Konzepte und Probleme, Münster: LIT, 2020
- Kirchenträume - Kirche in urchristlicher Zeit und Gegenwart, Münster: LIT, 2021
