= Mara bar Serapion on Jesus =

Ancient letter by a Stoic philosopher

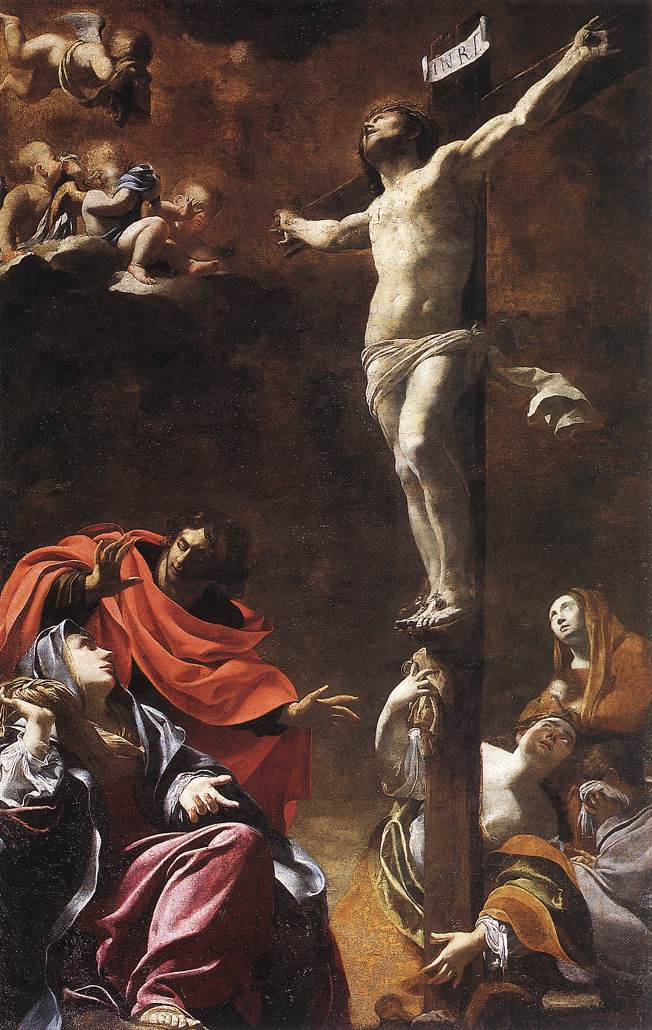
The titulus above Jesus reads INRI which is the Latin abbreviation for Iesus Nazarenus, Rex Iudaeorum, which translates to "Jesus the Nazarene, King of the Jews.

Mara bar Serapion was a Stoic philosopher from the Roman province of Syria. He is noted for a letter he wrote in Aramaic to his son, who was named Serapion. The letter was composed sometime after 73 AD but before the 3rd century, and most scholars date it to shortly after 73 AD during the first century. The letter may be an early non-Christian reference to the crucifixion of Jesus.

The letter refers to the unjust treatment of "three wise men": the murder of Socrates, the burning of Pythagoras, and the execution of "the wise king" of the Jews. The author explains that in all three cases the wrongdoing resulted in the future punishment of those responsible by God and that when the wise are oppressed, not only does their wisdom triumph in the end, but God punishes their oppressors.

The letter has been claimed to include no Christian themes and many scholars consider Mara a pagan, although some suggest he may have been a monotheist. Some scholars see the reference to the execution of a "wise king" of the Jews as an early non-Christian reference to Jesus. Criteria that support the non-Christian origin of the letter include the observation that "king of the Jews" was not a Christian title, and that the letter's premise that Jesus lives on in his teachings he enacted is in contrast to the Christian concept that Jesus continues to live through his resurrection.

Scholars such as Robert Van Voorst see little doubt that the reference to the execution of the "king of the Jews" is about the death of Jesus. Others such as Craig A. Evans see less value in the letter, given its uncertain date, and the ambiguity in the reference.

== The passage and its context ==
Mara Bar-Serapion's letter is preserved in a 6th or 7th century manuscript (BL Add. 14658) held by the British Library, and was composed sometime between 73 AD and the 3rd century. Nineteenth-century records state that the manuscript containing this text was one of several manuscripts obtained by Henry Tattam from the monastery of St. Mary Deipara in the Nitrian Desert of Egypt and acquired by the Library in 1843. William Cureton published an English translation in 1855.

The beginning of the letter makes it clear that it is written to the author's son: "Mara, son of Serapion, to my son Serapion, greetings." The key passage is as follows:

What else can we say, when the wise are forcibly dragged off by tyrants, their wisdom is captured by insults, and their minds are oppressed and without defense? What advantage did the Athenians gain from murdering Socrates? Famine and plague came upon them as a punishment for their crime. What advantage did the men of Samos gain from burning Pythagoras? In a moment their land was covered with sand. What advantage did the Jews gain from executing their wise king? It was just after that their kingdom was abolished. God justly avenged these three wise men: the Athenians died of hunger; the Samians were overwhelmed by the sea and the Jews, desolate and driven from their own kingdom, live in complete dispersion. But Socrates is not dead, because of Plato; neither is Pythagoras, because of the statue of Juno; nor is the wise king, because of the "new law" he laid down.

In this passage the author explains that when the wise are oppressed, not only does their wisdom triumph in the end, but God also punishes their oppressors.

The context of the letter is that the Romans had destroyed Mara's city in a war, taking him prisoner along with others. The letter was written from prison to encourage the author's son to pursue wisdom. It takes the form of a set of rhetorical questions which ask about the benefits of persecuting wise men.

Mara hints that the occupation of his land will in the end bring shame and disgrace on the Romans. His letter advises the pursuit of wisdom to face the difficulties of life.

== Historical analysis ==
The letter has been claimed to include no Christian themes and a number of leading scholars such as Sebastian Brock consider Mara a pagan. A small number of scholars suggest that Mara may have been a monotheist.

The non-Christian origin of the letter is supported by the observation that "king of the Jews" was not a Christian title during the time period the letter was written. The statement in the letter that the wise king lives on because of the "new law" he laid down is also seen as an indication of its non-Christian origin, for it ignores the Christian belief that Jesus continues to live through his resurrection. Another viewpoint is that he could be referring to the resurrection recorded in Jesus's teachings which say he lived on, thus establishing his "new law" (possibly paralleling the "New Covenant").

This means that it is impossible to infer if Mara believed the resurrection happened or not, and leaves it up to speculation whether he was a Christian or a non-Christian who agreed with Christians as regarding Jesus as a "wise king" according to the Gospels. Given that the gospel portraits of Jesus' crucifixion place much of the blame for the execution of Jesus on the Roman procurator Pontius Pilate (with the Jewish mob merely acting as agitators), some Gospels do agree with the Jews being to blame. And referring to "king of the Jews" rather than the Savior or Son of God indicates that the impressions of Bar-Serapion were not formed by Christian sources, although Jewish Christians did call him the king of the Jews.

Theologian Robert Van Voorst sees little doubt that the reference to the execution of the "king of the Jews" is about the death of Jesus. Van Voorst states that possible reasons for Bar-Serapion to suppress the name of Jesus from the letter include the ongoing persecutions of Christians at the time and his desire not to offend his Roman captors who also destroyed Jerusalem. Others such as Craig A. Evans sees less value in the letter, given its uncertain date, and the possible ambiguity in the reference.

Bruce Chilton states that Bar-Serapion reference to the "king of Jews" may be related to the INRI inscription on the cross of Jesus' crucifixion, as in the Gospel of Mark (15:26 paragraph 1). Van Voorst states that the parallels drawn between the unjust treatment of three men, and the destruction of Athens and Samos leads to the conclusion that Bar-Serapion viewed the destruction of Jerusalem as punishment for the Jewish rejection of Jesus.

Evans, however, argues that unlike the references to Socrates and Pythagoras, bar Serapion does not explicitly mention Jesus by name, thereby rendering the actual identity of the "wise king" in the letter less than certain.

The letter was written after the AD 72 annexation of Samosata by the Romans, but before the third century. Most scholars date the letter to shortly after AD 73 during the first century.

== See also ==
- Josephus on Jesus
- Suetonius on Christians
- Tacitus on Christ
