= Tacitus on Jesus =

References by Roman historian and senator Tacitus to Jesus

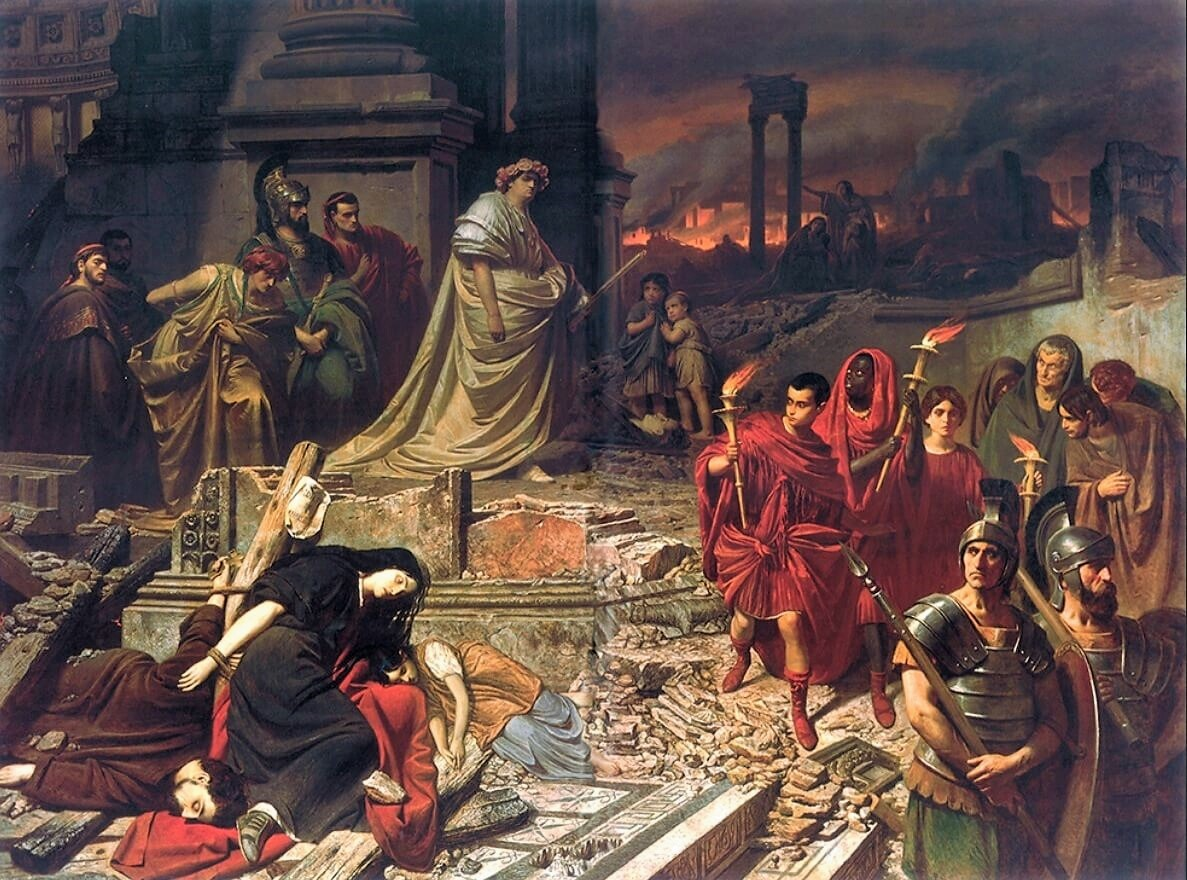
The Fire of Rome, 1861 work by Karl von Piloty. According to Tacitus, Nero targeted Christians as those responsible for the fire.

Roman historian and politician Tacitus referred to Jesus, his execution by Pontius Pilate, and the existence of early Christians in Rome in his final work, Annals (written c. AD 116), book 15, chapter 44. The context of the passage is the six-day Great Fire of Rome that burned much of the city in AD 64 during the reign of Roman Emperor Nero. The passage is one of the earliest non-Christian references to the origins of Christianity, the execution of Christ described in the canonical gospels, and the presence and persecution of Christians in 1st-century Rome.

There are two points of vocabulary in the passage. First, Tacitus may have used the word "Chrestians" (Chrestianos) for Christians, but then speaks of "Christ" (Christus) as the origin of that name. Second, he calls Pilate a "procurator", even though other sources indicate that he had the title "prefect". Scholars have proposed various hypotheses to explain these peculiarities. The scholarly consensus is that Tacitus's reference to the execution of Jesus by Pontius Pilate is both authentic, and of historical value as an independent Roman source. However, Tacitus does not reveal the source of his information. There are several hypotheses as to what sources he may have used.

Tacitus provides non-Christian confirmation of the crucifixion of Jesus. Scholars view it as establishing three separate facts about Rome around AD 60: (i) that there were a sizable number of Christians in Rome at the time, (ii) that it was possible to distinguish between Christians and Jews in Rome, and (iii) that at the time pagans made a connection between Christianity in Rome and its origin in Roman Judaea. Tacitus is one of the non-Christian writers of the time who mentioned Jesus and early Christianity along with Flavius Josephus, Pliny the Younger, and Suetonius.

== The passage and its context ==
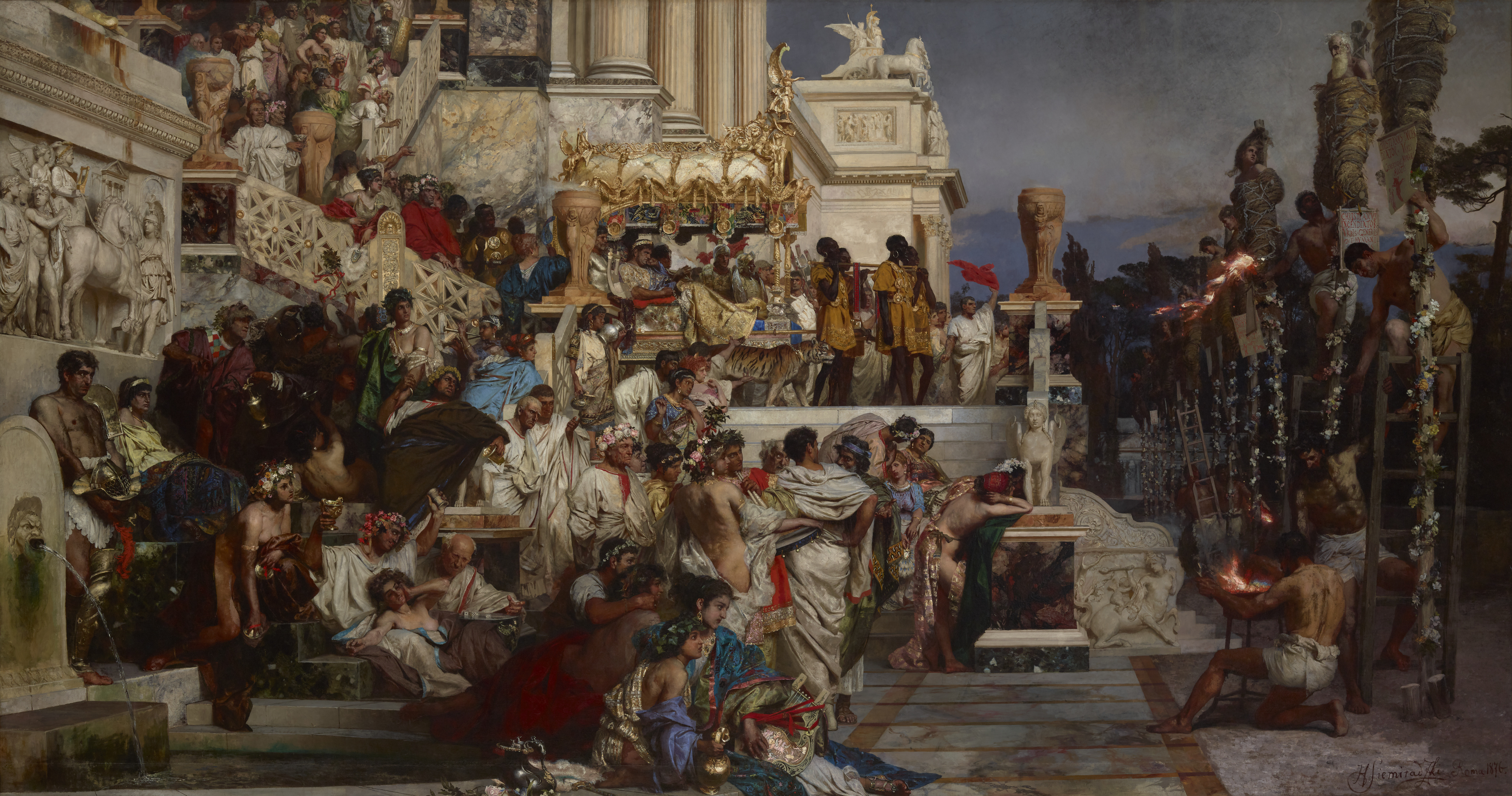
Nero's Torches, by Henryk Siemiradzki (1876)

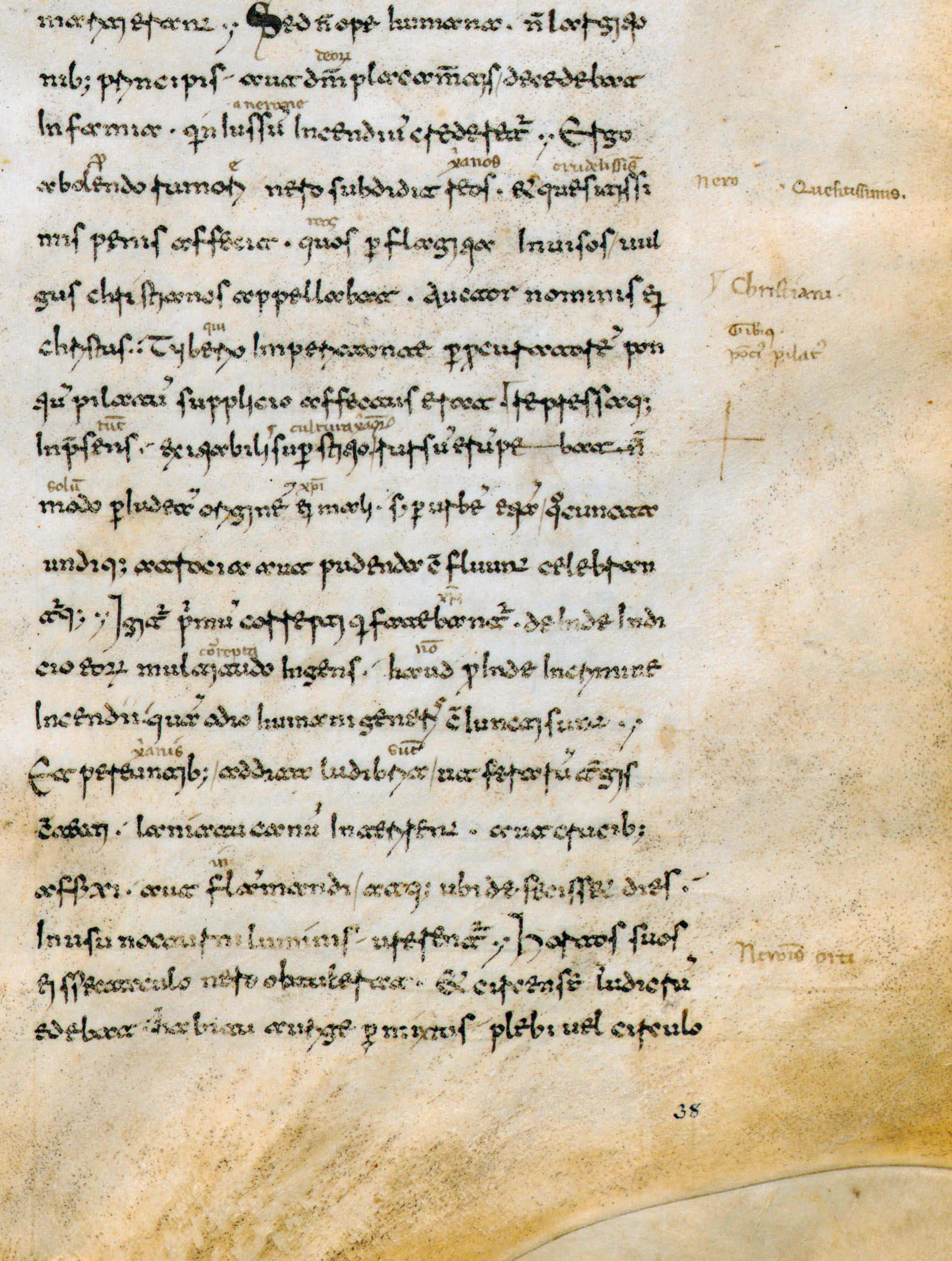
Part of the page from the 11th century codex containing Annales, xv. 44.3–8, the passage with the reference to Christians (Florence, Laurentian Library, Plut. 68.2, f. 38r)

The Annals passage (15.44), which has been subjected to much scholarly analysis, follows a description of the six-day Great Fire of Rome that burned much of Rome in July 64 AD. The key part of the passage reads as follows (translation from Latin by A. J. Church and W. J. Brodribb, 1876):

Sed non ope humana, non largitionibus principis aut deum placamentis decedebat infamia, quin iussum incendium crederetur. ergo abolendo rumori Nero subdidit reos et quaesitissimis poenis adfecit, quos per flagitia invisos vulgus Chrestianos appellabat. auctor nominis eius Christus Tibero imperitante per procuratorem Pontium Pilatum supplicio adfectus erat; repressaque in praesens exitiabilis superstitio rursum erumpebat, non modo per Iudaeam, originem eius mali, sed per urbem etiam, quo cuncta undique atrocia aut pudenda confluunt celebranturque. igitur primum correpti qui fatebantur, deinde indicio eorum multitudo ingens haud proinde in crimine incendii quam odio humani generis convicti sunt.

Translation:

But all human efforts, all the lavish gifts of the emperor, and the propitiations of the gods, did not banish the sinister belief that the conflagration was the result of an order. Consequently, to get rid of the report, Nero fastened the guilt and inflicted the most exquisite tortures on a class hated for their abominations, called Christians by the populace. Christus, from whom the name had its origin, suffered the extreme penalty during the reign of Tiberius at the hands of one of our procurators, Pontius Pilatus, and a most mischievous superstition, thus checked for the moment, again broke out not only in Judæa, the first source of the evil, but even in Rome, where all things hideous and shameful from every part of the world find their centre and become popular. Accordingly, an arrest was first made of all who pleaded guilty; then, upon their information, an immense multitude was convicted, not so much of the crime of firing the city, as of hatred against mankind.

Tacitus then describes the torture of Christians:

Mockery of every sort was added to their deaths. Covered with the skins of beasts, they were torn by dogs and perished, or were nailed to crosses, or were doomed to the flames and burnt, to serve as a nightly illumination, when daylight had expired. Nero offered his gardens for the spectacle, and was exhibiting a show in the circus, while he mingled with the people in the dress of a charioteer or stood aloft on a car. Hence, even for criminals who deserved extreme and exemplary punishment, there arose a feeling of compassion; for it was not, as it seemed, for the public good, but to glut one man's cruelty, that they were being destroyed.

The exact cause of the fire remains uncertain, but much of the population of Rome suspected that Emperor Nero had started the fire himself. To divert attention from himself, Nero accused the Christians of starting the fire and persecuted them, making this the first documented confrontation between Christians and the authorities in Rome. Tacitus suggested that Nero used the Christians as scapegoats.

As with almost all ancient Greek and Latin literature, no original manuscripts of the Annals exist. The surviving copies of Tacitus' major works derive from two principal manuscripts, known as the Medicean manuscripts, which are held in the Laurentian Library in Florence, Italy. The second of them (Plut. 68.2), as the only one containing books xi–xvi of the Annales, is the oldest witness to the passage describing Christians. Scholars generally agree that this codex was written in the 11th century at the Benedictine abbey of Monte Cassino and its end refers to Abbas Raynaldus cu... who was most probably one of the two abbots of that name at the abbey during that period.

== Points of vocabulary ==
=== Christians and Chrestians ===
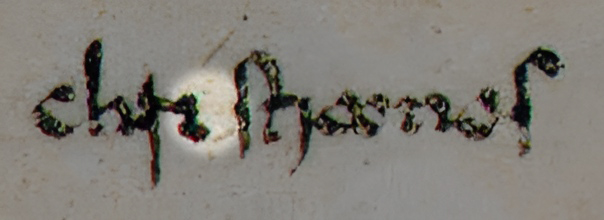
Detail from the page of the Codex Laurentianus Mediceus 68.2 (f. 38r) containing Annales xv. 44.4: in the word 'Christianos' the gap between the 'i' and 's' is highlighted

The passage states:

... called Christians by the populace. Christus, from whom the name had its origin ...

In 1902 Georg Andresen commented on the appearance of the first 'i' and subsequent gap in the earliest extant, 11th century, copy of the Annals in Florence, suggesting that the text had been altered, and an 'e' had originally been in the text, rather than this 'i'. "With ultra-violet examination of the MS the alteration was conclusively shown. It is impossible today to say who altered the letter e into an i." Since the alteration became known it has given rise to debates among scholars as to whether Tacitus deliberately used the term "Chrestians", or if a scribe made an error during the Middle Ages. It has been stated that both the terms Christians and Chrestians had at times been used by the general population in Rome to refer to early Christians. Robert E. Van Voorst states that many sources indicate that the term Chrestians was also used among the early followers of Jesus by the second century. The term Christians appears only three times in the New Testament, the first usage (Acts 11:26) giving the origin of the term. In all three cases the uncorrected Codex Sinaiticus in Greek reads Chrestianoi. In Phrygia a number of funerary stone inscriptions use the term Chrestians, with one stone inscription using both terms together, reading: "Chrestians for Christians".

Adolf von Harnack argued that Chrestians was the original wording, and that Tacitus deliberately used Christus immediately after it to show his own superior knowledge compared to the population at large. Robert Renehan has stated that it was natural for a Roman to mix the two words that sounded the same, that Chrestianos was the original word in the Annals and not an error by a scribe. Van Voorst has stated that it was unlikely for Tacitus himself to refer to Christians as Chrestianos i.e. "useful ones" given that he also referred to them as "hated for their shameful acts". Eddy and Boyd see no major impact on the authenticity of the passage or its meaning regardless of the use of either term by Tacitus.

Whatever the original wording of Tacitus, another ancient source about the Neronian persecution, by Suetonius, apparently speaks of "Christians": "In Suetonius' Nero 16.2, 'christiani', however, seems to be the original reading."

=== The rank of Pilate ===
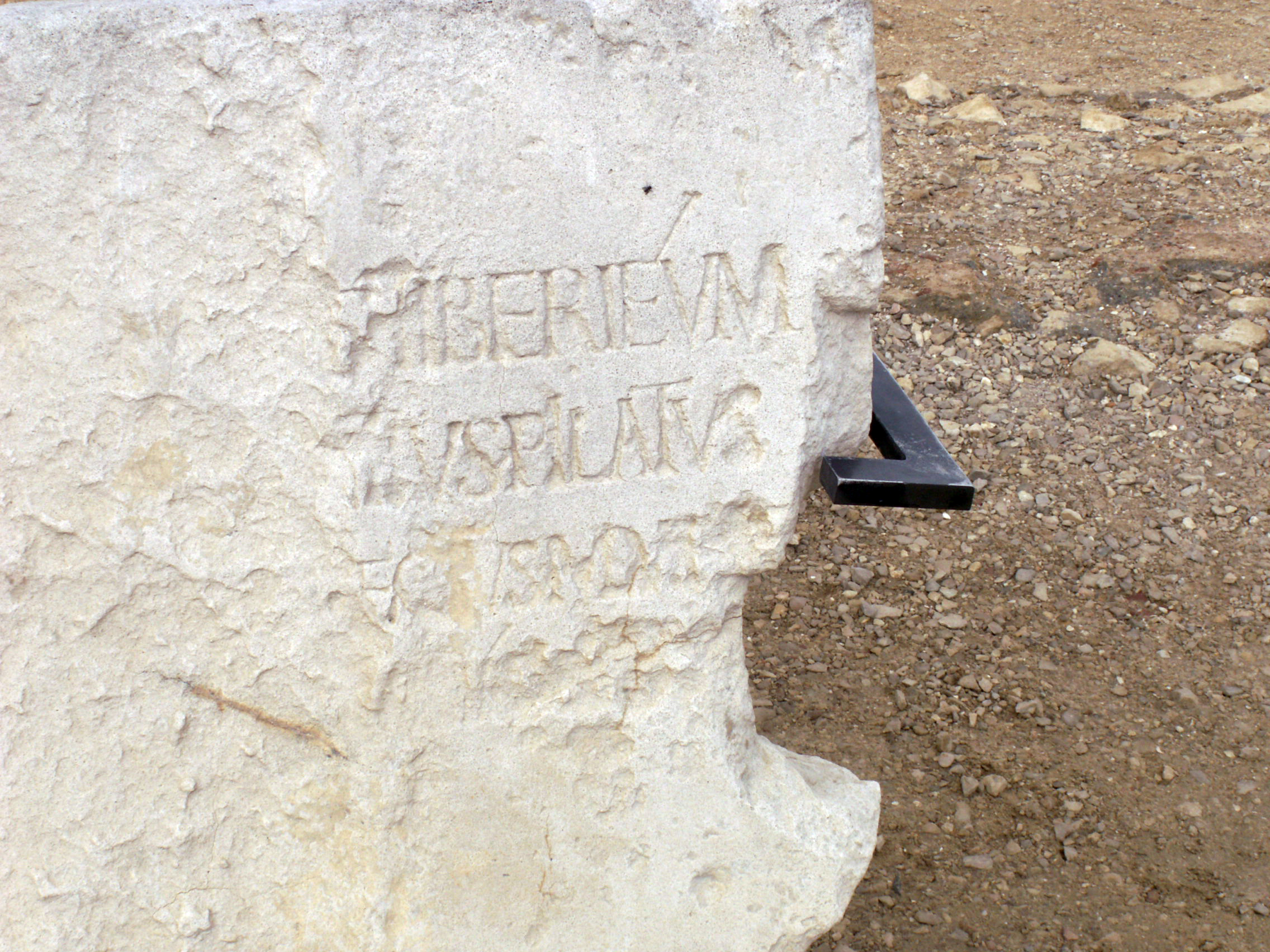
The Pilate Stone, now at the Israel Museum

Pilate's rank while he was governor of Judaea appeared in a Latin inscription on the Pilate Stone which called him a prefect, while this Tacitean passage calls him a procurator. Josephus refers to Pilate with the generic Greek term ἡγεμών (hēgemṓn), or governor. Tacitus records that Claudius was the ruler who gave procurators governing power. After Herod Agrippa's death in AD 44, when Judea reverted to direct Roman rule, Claudius gave procurators control over Judea.

Various theories have been put forward to explain why Tacitus should use the term "procurator" when the archaeological evidence indicates that Pilate was a prefect. Jerry Vardaman theorizes that Pilate's title was changed during his stay in Judea and that the Pilate Stone dates from the early years of his administration. Baruch Lifshitz postulates that the inscription would originally have mentioned the title of "procurator" along with "prefect". L.A. Yelnitsky argues that the use of "procurator" in Annals 15.44.3 is a Christian interpolation. S.G.F. Brandon suggests that there is no real difference between the two ranks. John Dominic Crossan states that Tacitus "retrojected" the title procurator which was in use at the time of Claudius back onto Pilate who was called prefect in his own time. Bruce Chilton and Craig Evans as well as Van Voorst state that Tacitus apparently used the title procurator because it was more common at the time of his writing and that this variation in the use of the title should not be taken as evidence to doubt the correctness of the information Tacitus provides. Warren Carter states that, as the term "prefect" has a military connotation, while "procurator" is civilian, the use of either term may be appropriate for governors who have a range of military, administrative and fiscal responsibilities.

Louis Feldman says that Philo (who died AD 50) and Josephus also use the term "procurator" for Pilate. As both Philo and Josephus wrote in Greek, neither of them actually used the term "procurator", but the Greek word ἐπίτροπος (epítropos), which is regularly translated as "procurator". Philo also uses this Greek term for the governors of Egypt (a prefect), of Asia (a proconsul) and Syria (a legate). Werner Eck, in his list of terms for governors of Judea found in the works of Josephus, shows that, while in the early work, The Jewish War, Josephus uses epitropos less consistently, the first governor to be referred to by the term in Antiquities of the Jews was Cuspius Fadus, (who was in office AD 44–46). Feldman notes that Philo, Josephus and Tacitus may have anachronistically confused the timing of the titles—prefect later changing to procurator. Feldman also notes that the use of the titles may not have been rigid, for Josephus refers to Cuspius Fadus both as "prefect" and "procurator".

== Authenticity ==
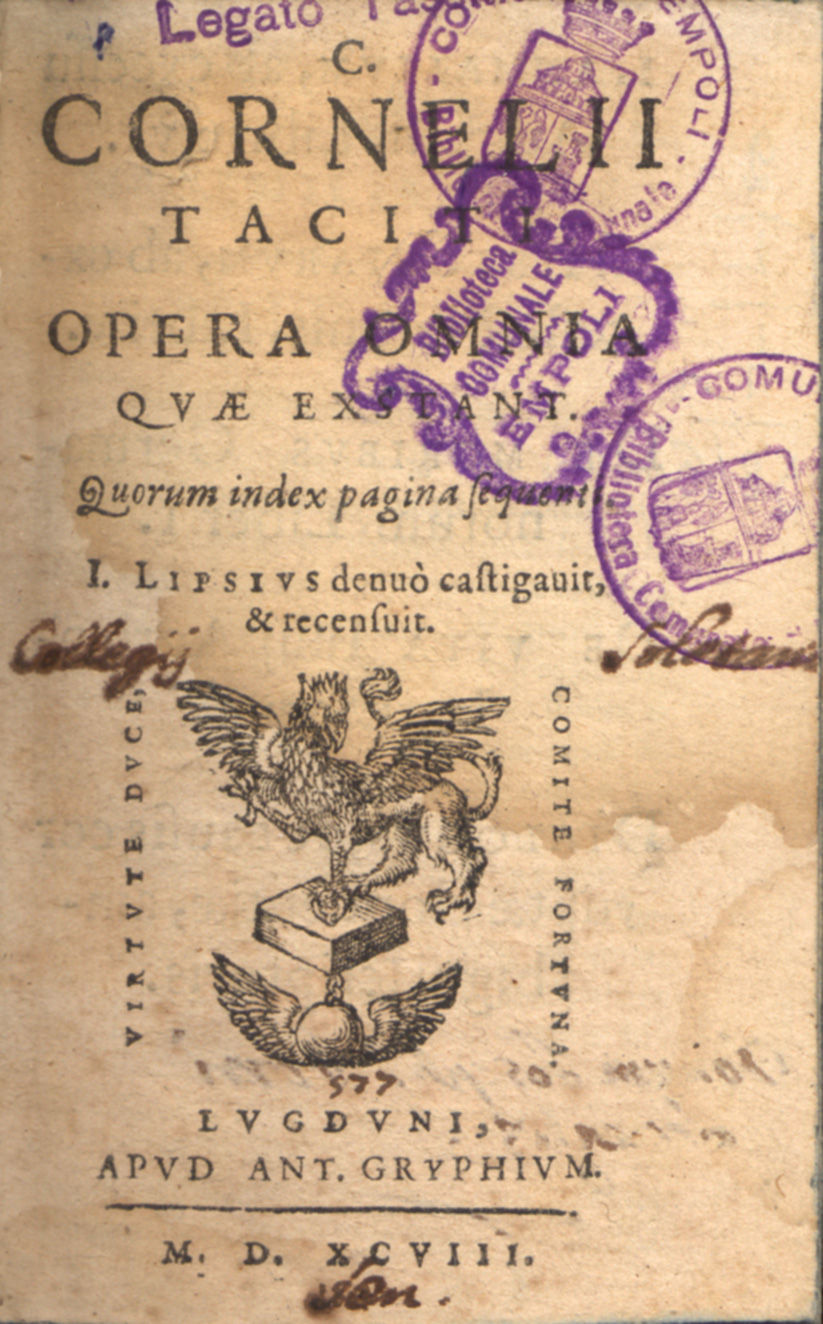
The title page of 1598 edition of the works of Tacitus, kept in Empoli, Italy

Most scholars hold the passage to be authentic and that Tacitus was the author. Classicists observe that in a recent assessment by latinists on the passage, they unanimously deemed the passage authentic and noted that no serious Tacitean scholar believes it to be an interpolation.

Suggestions that the passage may have been a complete forgery have been generally rejected by scholars. John P. Meier states that there is no historical or archaeological evidence to support the argument that a scribe may have introduced the passage into the text. Scholars such as Bruce Chilton, Craig Evans, Paul Eddy and Gregory Boyd agree with John Meier's statement that "Despite some feeble attempts to show that this text is a Christian interpolation in Tacitus, the passage is obviously genuine".

Tacitus was a patriotic Roman senator. His writings show no sympathy towards Christians, or knowledge of who their leader was. His characterization of "Christian abominations" may have been based on the rumours in Rome that during the Eucharist rituals Christians ate the body and drank the blood of their God, interpreting the ritual as cannibalism. Andreas Köstenberger states that the tone of the passage towards Christians is far too negative to have been authored by a Christian scribe. Van Voorst also states that the passage is unlikely to be a Christian forgery because of the pejorative language used to describe Christianity.

Tacitus was about seven years old at the time of the Great Fire of Rome and, like other Romans, as he grew up he would have most likely heard about the fire that destroyed most of the city, and Nero's accusations against Christians. When Tacitus wrote his account, he was the governor of the province of Asia, and as a member of the inner circle in Rome he would have known of the official position with respect to the fire and the Christians.

William L. Portier has stated that the references to Christ and Christians by Tacitus, Josephus and the letters to Emperor Trajan by Pliny the Younger are consistent, which reaffirms the validity of all three accounts.

== Sources used by Tacitus ==
The majority of scholars consider the passage to be genuinely by Tacitus. However, he does not reveal the source of his information. For this reason, some scholars have debated the historical value of the passage.

Gerd Theissen and Annette Merz argue that Tacitus at times had drawn on earlier historical works now lost to us, and he may have used official sources from a Roman archive in this case; however, if Tacitus had been copying from an official source, some scholars would expect him to have labelled Pilate correctly as a prefect rather than a procurator. Theissen and Merz state that Tacitus gives us a description of widespread prejudices about Christianity and a few precise details about "Christus" and Christianity, the source of which remains unclear. However, Paul Eddy has stated that given his position as a senator, Tacitus was also likely to have had access to official Roman documents of the time and did not need other sources.

Scholars have also debated the issue of hearsay in the reference by Tacitus. Charles Guignebert argued that "So long as there is that possibility [that Tacitus is merely echoing what Christians themselves were saying], the passage remains quite worthless". R. T. France states that the Tacitus passage is at best just Tacitus repeating what he had heard through Christians. However, Paul Eddy has stated that as Rome's preeminent historian, Tacitus was generally known for checking his sources and was not in the habit of reporting gossip.

Tacitus was a member of the Quindecimviri sacris faciundis, a council of priests whose duty it was to supervise foreign religious cults in Rome, which as Van Voorst points out, makes it reasonable to suppose that he would have acquired knowledge of Christian origins through his work with that body.

== Historical value ==
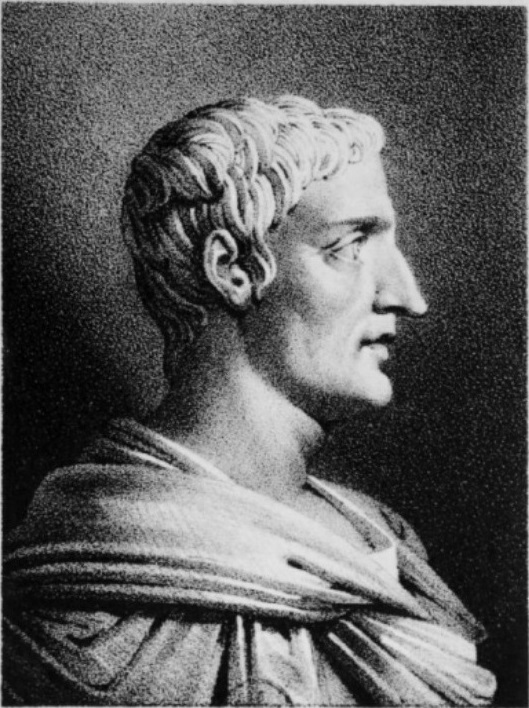
Portrait of Tacitus, based on an antique bust

Depending on the sources Tacitus used, the passage is potentially of historical value regarding Jesus, early Christianity, and its persecution under emperor Nero.

Regarding Jesus, Van Voorst states that "of all Roman writers, Tacitus gives us the most precise information about Christ". Crossan considers the passage important in establishing that Jesus existed and was crucified, and states: "That he was crucified is as sure as anything historical can ever be, since both Josephus and Tacitus... agree with the Christian accounts on at least that basic fact." Eddy and Boyd state that it is now "firmly established" that Tacitus provides a non-Christian confirmation of the crucifixion of Jesus. Biblical scholar Bart D. Ehrman wrote: "Tacitus's report confirms what we know from other sources, that Jesus was executed by order of the Roman governor of Judea, Pontius Pilate, sometime during Tiberius's reign."

However, some scholars question the value of the passage given that Tacitus was born 25 years after Jesus' death.

Regarding early Christianity, scholars generally consider Tacitus's reference to be of historical value as an independent Roman source that is in unison with other historical records. James D. G. Dunn considers the passage as useful in establishing facts about early Christians, e.g. that there was a sizable number of Christians in Rome around AD 60. Dunn states that Tacitus seems to be under the impression that Christians were part of some form of Judaism, although different. Raymond E. Brown and John P. Meier state that in addition to establishing that there was a large body of Christians in Rome, the Tacitus passage provides two other important pieces of historical information, namely that by around AD 60 it was possible to distinguish between Christians and Jews in Rome and that even pagans made a connection between Christianity in Rome and its origin in Judea.

Regarding the Neronian persecution, the scholarly consensus is that it did take place. Questioning this consensus, Weaver notes that Tacitus spoke of the persecution of Christians, but no other Christian author wrote of this persecution for a hundred years. Brent Shaw has argued that no persecution took place under Nero, and instead Tacitus was relying on Christian and Jewish legendary sources that portrayed Nero as the Antichrist. Shaw has questioned if the passage represents "some modernizing or updating of the facts" to reflect the Christian world at the time the text was written.

Shaw's views have received strong criticism and have not been widely accepted by the scholarly consensus: Christopher P. Jones (Harvard University) answered Shaw and refuted his arguments, noting that Tacitus's anti-Christian stance makes it unlikely that he was using Christian sources; he also noted that the Epistle to the Romans of Paul the Apostle clearly points to the fact that there was indeed a clear and distinct Christian community in Rome in the 50s and that the persecution is also mentioned by Suetonius in The Twelve Caesars. Larry Hurtado was also critical of Shaw's argument, dismissing it as "vague and hazy". Brigit van der Lans and Jan N. Bremmer dismissed Shaw's argument, noting that the Neronian persecution is recorded in many 1st-century Christian writings, such as the Epistle to the Hebrews, the Book of Revelation, the apocryphal Ascension of Isaiah, the First Epistle of Peter, the Gospel of John and the First Epistle of Clement; they also argued that Chrestianus, Christianus, and Χριστιανός were probably terms invented by the Romans in the 50s and then adopted by Christians themselves. John Granger Cook also rejected Shaw's thesis, arguing that Chrestianus, Christianus, and Χριστιανός are not creations of the second century and that Roman officials were probably aware of the Chrestiani in the 60s. Barry S. Strauss also rejects Shaw's argument.

== Other early sources ==
Tacitus is not the only non-Christian writer of the time who mentioned Jesus and early Christianity.

The earliest known references to Christianity are found in Antiquities of the Jews, a 20-volume work written by the Jewish historian Titus Flavius Josephus around 93–94 AD, during the reign of emperor Domitian. As it stands now, this work includes two references to Jesus and Christians (in Book 18, Chapter 3 and Book 20, Chapter 9), and also a reference to John the Baptist (in Book 18, Chapter 5).

The next known reference to Christianity was written by Pliny the Younger, who was the Roman governor of Bithynia and Pontus during the reign of emperor Trajan. Around 111 AD, Pliny wrote a letter to emperor Trajan. As it stands now, the letter is requesting guidance on how to deal with suspected Christians who appeared before him in trials he was holding at that time. Tacitus' references to Nero's persecution of Christians in the Annals were written around 115 AD, a few years after Pliny's letter but also during the reign of emperor Trajan.

Another notable early author was Gaius Suetonius Tranquillus, who wrote the Lives of the Twelve Caesars around 122 AD, during the reign of emperor Hadrian. In this work, Suetonius apparently described why Jewish Christians were expelled from Rome by emperor Claudius, and also the persecution of Christians by Nero, who was the heir and successor of Claudius.

== See also ==
- Annals (Tacitus)
- Tacitus
- Christianity in the 1st century
- Persecution of Christians in the Roman Empire
- Historicity of Jesus
- Sources for the historicity of Jesus
  - Josephus on Jesus
  - Pliny the Younger on Christians
  - Suetonius on Christians
  - Mara bar Serapion on Jesus
