= Suetonius on Christians =

Mentions of Christians by the historian Suetonius

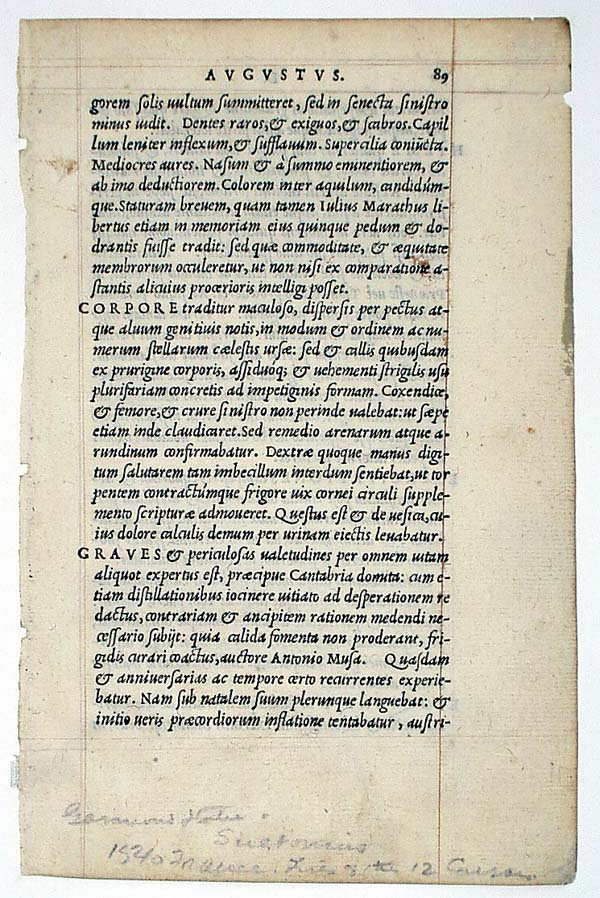
A 1540 copy of Lives of the Twelve Caesars by Suetonius

The Roman historian Suetonius (c. AD 69 – c. AD 122) mentions early Christians and may refer to Jesus Christ in his work Lives of the Twelve Caesars. One passage in the biography of the Emperor Claudius Divus Claudius 25, refers to agitations in the Roman Jewish community and the expulsion of Jews from Rome by Claudius during his reign (AD 41 to AD 54), which may be the expulsion mentioned in the Acts of the Apostles (18:2). In this context "Chresto" is mentioned. Some scholars see this as a likely reference to Jesus, while others see it as referring to another person living in Rome, of whom we have no information.

Christians are explicitly mentioned in Suetonius's biography of the Emperor Nero (Nero 16) as among those punished during Nero's reign. These punishments are generally dated to around AD 64, the year of the Great Fire of Rome. In this passage Suetonius describes Christianity as excessive religiosity (superstitio) as do his contemporaries, Tacitus and Pliny.

Historians debate whether or not the Roman government distinguished between Christians and Jews prior to Nerva's modification of the Fiscus Judaicus in AD 96. From then on, practising Jews paid the tax, Christians did not.

== Christians under Nero ==
Roman Emperor Nero reigned 54 to 68 AD. In Nero 16, Suetonius lists various laws by Nero to maintain public order, including halting chariot races, as the drivers were cheating and robbing, and pantomime shows which frequently were scenes of brawls. Amongst these is punishment for Christians. He states:

During his reign many abuses were severely punished and put down, and no fewer new laws were made: a limit was set to expenditures; the public banquets were confined to a distribution of food; the sale of any kind of cooked viands in the taverns was forbidden, with the exception of pulse and vegetables, whereas before every sort of dainty was exposed for sale. Punishment was inflicted on the Christians, a class of men given to a new and mischievous superstition. He put an end to the diversions of the chariot drivers, who from immunity of long standing claimed the right of ranging at large and amusing themselves by cheating and robbing the people. The pantomimic actors and their partisans were banished from the city.

The punishment of Christians by Nero are generally dated to c. 64 AD. Unlike Tacitus's reference to the persecution of Christians by Nero, Suetonius does not relate the persecution with the Great Fire of Rome that occurred in 64 AD.

Apart from the manuscripts and printed editions of Suetonius's Lives, the sentence about Christians is first attested in an inscription by the Senate and People of Paris from 1590. K.R. Bradley notes that the verb in the clause "Punishment was inflicted on the Christians" (Latin: afflicti suppliciis christiani) should be corrected to "affecti", based first on the frequent use of this verb with the word for "punishment" and second on that Orosius, according to Bradley, uses this verb in material dependent on the Suetonius Nero 16 passage. These words in combination indicate that the punishment was capital; cf. e.g. Suet. Augustus 17.5 (death of young Antony), Claudius 26.2 (death of Messalina) and Galba 12.1 (death of officials).

=== Tertullian ===
Church father Tertullian wrote: "We read the lives of the Cæsars: At Rome Nero was the first who stained with blood the rising faith." Mary Ellen Snodgrass notes that Tertullian in this passage "used Suetonius as a source by quoting Lives of the Caesars as proof that Nero was the first Roman emperor to murder Christians", but cites not a specific passage in Suetonius's Lives as Tertullian's source. Other authors explicitly add that Tertullian's words are a reference to the passage in Suetonius's Nero 16, while others hold that they refer to the Tacitus passage, or both (Nero & Tacitus) passages.

=== Interpretation ===
In Roman usage, the word superstitio refers to any excessive religious devotion, within or outside traditional Roman religious practice. To Suetonius this particular excessive devotion was new and mischievous. This may have been the case in Suetonius's time, but Marius Heemstra thinks he was backdating the accusation to the time of Nero.

The word translated as "mischievous" above is maleficus which can also mean "magical". As a noun the word means "magician". It may be that Suetonius is here accusing Christians of using what would be called "black magic" in modern terms, as the pagan philosopher Celsus did about 177.

The passage shows the clear contempt of Suetonius for Christians - the same contempt expressed by Tacitus and Pliny the Younger in their writings. Stephen Benko states that the contempt of Suetonius is quite clear, as he reduces Christians to the lowest ranks of society and his statement echoes the sentiments of Pliny and Tacitus.

== Possible Christians under Claudius ==
Roman Emperor Claudius reigned 41 to 54 AD. Suetonius reports his dealings with the eastern Roman Empire, that is, with Greece and Macedonia, and with the Lycians, Rhodians, and Trojans.

In Claudius 25 Suetonius refers to the expulsion of Jews by Claudius and states (in Catharine Edwards' translation):

Since the Jews constantly made disturbances at the instigation of Chrestus, he expelled them from Rome.

As it is highly unlikely that a hypothetical Christian interpolator would have called the Christ (Latin "Christus") "Chrestus", placed him in Rome in 49, or called him a "troublemaker", the overwhelming majority of scholars conclude that the passage is genuine.

=== The Latin text ===
The Latin original version of this statement is as follows (in Ihm's edition):

Iudaeos impulsore Chresto (Note: Boman (2012) states that there are many different spellings of this word in the manuscripts he examined, namely "Chresto, Cherestro, Cresto, Chrestro, Cheresto, Christo, xpo, xpisto, and Cristo". The readings Chestro and Chirestro, mentioned by earlier scholars, "might indeed be only scholarly misspellings" he writes. He concludes that "the majority of the 41 manuscripts collected [by him], including a vast majority of the oldest and most trustworthy manuscripts from the 9th to the 13th century, belonging to both [manuscript] families read Chresto" and that "it is incorrect to claim that only one manuscript contains this reading (Torrentius), that Chresto is only an occasional reading (Botermann) or that no copyist ever wrote Christo (Van Voorst)", "that Cherestro, and other similar spellings, in all likelihood are at best mere scribal or scholarly conjectures, but rather pure scribal errors which have been incautiously transmitted" and that "Christ-spellings in the MSS most likely are the conjectures by Christian scribes or scholars.") assidue tumultuantis Roma expulit

The brief Latin statement has been described as a "notorious crux" (Note: Donna Hurley also notes that impulsore Chresto is "surely the most notorious phrase Suetonius ever wrote." Leonard Rutgers states that "the interpretation of Suetonius's phrase impulsore Chresto is difficult" and "opinions differ as to what caused these disturbances.") and William L. Lane explains that the Latin text is ambiguous, giving two ways of interpreting it:

1. "He expelled from Rome the Jews constantly making disturbances at the instigation of Chrestus"
2. "Since the Jews constantly make disturbances at the instigation of Chrestus, he expelled them from Rome."

The first indicates that Claudius only expelled those Jews who were making disturbances. Boman (2012) uses the following translation, which he "consider[s] non-committal and adequately close to the original Latin": "From Rome he (Claudius) expelled the perpetually tumultuating Jews prompted by Chrestus."

==== The spelling issue ====
Chresto (ablative of Chrestus) is the most trustworthy spelling in Suetonius's work. William L. Lane states that the confusion between Chrestus and Christus was natural enough for Suetonius, given that at that point in history the distinction between spelling and pronunciation was negligible. Lane states that this is supported by the spelling of Christians in Acts 11:26, Acts 26:28 and in 1 Peter 4:16 where the uncial codex Sinaiticus reads Chrestianos. Raymond E. Brown states in the second century, when Suetonius wrote, both Christus (Christ) and Christianus (Christian) were often written with an "e" instead of an "i" after the "r". In Suetonius Nero 16 the word "Christians" is spelled christiani.

=== Interpretation ===
The term Chrestus (which may have also been used by Tacitus) was common at the time, meaning good or useful. Heikki Solin lists 126 people from Rome named Chrestus, of whom 59 were slaves. From III CE some of them were Christians.

James D. G. Dunn states that most scholars infer that "Suetonius misheard the name 'Christus' (referring to Jesus as Christ) as 'Chrestus'" and also misunderstood the report and assumed that the followers of someone called Chrestus were causing disturbances within the Jewish community based on his instigation.

John Granger Cook refers to numerous events of the later books of the New Testament that indicate Romans in the time of Claudius could be expected to distinguish between followers of Judaism and Christianity. At the same time, he points out that in that time, "'Christus' is exceedingly rare outside of Christian contexts," suggesting that Suetonius makes a simple error of confusing the fairly common "Chrestus" for the instigator of the Jews.

R. T. France says that the notion of a misspelling by Suetonius "can never be more than a guess, and the fact that Suetonius can elsewhere speak of 'Christians' as members of a new cult (without any reference to Jews) surely makes it rather unlikely that he could make such a mistake."

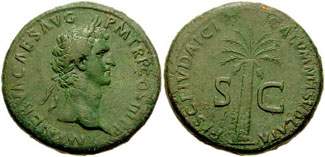
A coin issued by Emperor Nerva (AD 96–98) reads fisci Judaici calumnia sublata, "abolition of malicious prosecution in connection with the Jewish tax"

Louis Feldman states that most scholars assume that in the reference Jesus is meant and that the disturbances mentioned were due to the spread of Christianity in Rome. Robert E. Van Voorst states that Suetonius had a misleading source of information leading him to believe that Christ was actually present as an agitator during the reign of Claudius. Later, Van Voorst explains that in the passage Chrestus is most likely an error for Christus. E. M. Smallwood states that the only reasonable interpretation is that Suetonius was referring to Christianity. Edwin M. Yamauchi states that "A growing number of scholars, however, have accepted the argument that the "Chrestus" mentioned in Suetonius was simply a Jewish agitator with a common name, and that he had no association with Christianity." Among recent classical scholars there does not seem to be the certainty that is found among many biblical studies scholars. Barbara Levick comments, "To claim that Suetonius, writing in the second century, misunderstood a reference to Christians in his source is unconvincingly economical", concluding "The precise cause of the expulsion remains obscure." J. Mottershead in her commentary on the Claudius states that if Suetonius "had included a reference to Christ one would not have expected him to have simply used Chrestus/Christus unqualified." This points "towards the conclusion that Suetonius did not have in mind a religious dispute involving Christians."

Menahem Stern said that Suetonius was definitely referring to Jesus Christ; because he would have added "a certain" to Chrestus if he had meant an unknown agitator.

=== Disturbance and expulsion ===
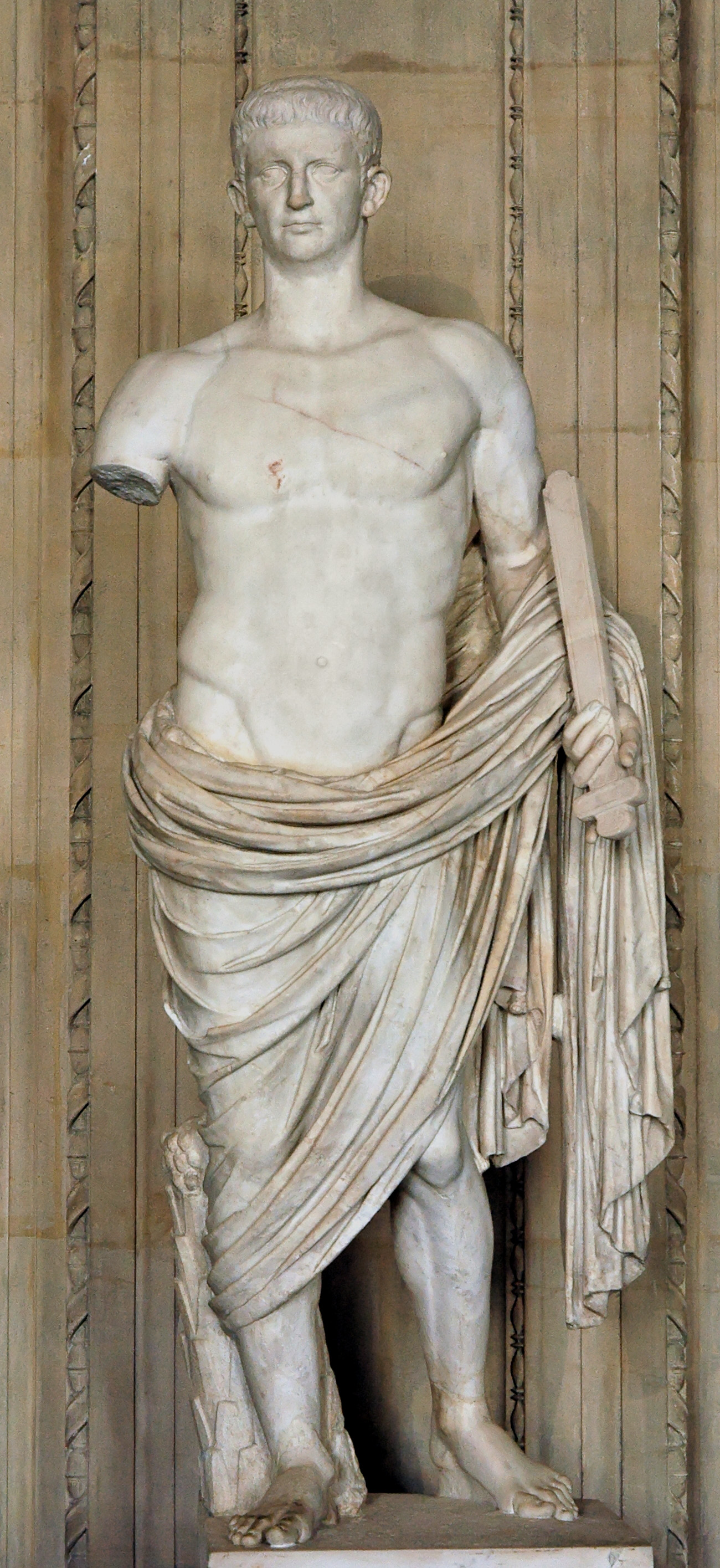
Claudius statue, Louvre

Most scholars assume that the disturbances mentioned by Suetonius in the passage were due to the spread of Christianity in Rome. These disturbances were likely caused by the objections of Jewish community to the continued preachings by Hellenistic Jews in Rome and their insistence that Jesus was the Messiah, resulting in tensions with the Jews in Rome.

Some scholars think Suetonius was confused and assumed that Chrestus, as the leader of the agitators, was alive and lived in Rome at the time of the expulsion. The notion that Chrestus was instigating Jewish unrest suggests that the Chrestus reference is not a Christian interpolation, for a Christian scribe would be unlikely to think of the followers of Christ as Jews, or place him in Rome at the time of Claudius. This problem weakens the historical value of the reference as a whole. Scholars are divided on the value of the Suetonius reference; some see it as a reference to Jesus, while others see it as a reference to disturbances by an unknown agitator. (Note: The same view has been espoused by Neil Elliot ('impulsore Chresto probably refers to "Chrestus" having prompted Claudius's expulsion, not the Jews' disturbances') and Ian Rock ("there is sufficient reason to believe that either Chrestus may have been the impulsor to Claudius given the evidence that powerful freedmen influenced Claudius' decisions").)

Dating the expulsion provides some challenges because Suetonius writes in a topical rather than chronological fashion, necessitating the use of other texts to establish a time frame. The dating of the "edict of Claudius" for the expulsion of Jews relies on three separate texts beyond Suetonius's own reference, which in chronological order are: the reference to the trial of Apostle Paul by Gallio in the Acts of the Apostles (18:2), Cassius Dio's reference in History 60.6.6-7 and Paulus Orosius's fifth century mention in History 7.6.15-16 of a non-extant Josephus. Scholars generally agree that these references refer to the same event. Most scholars agree that the expulsion of some Jews mentioned by Suetonius happened around AD 49–50, but a minority of scholars suggest dates within a few years of that range.

== Other Roman sources ==
Suetonius is one of three key Roman authors who may refer to early Christians, the other two being Pliny the Younger and Tacitus. These authors refer to events which take place during the reign of various Roman emperors, Suetonius writing about the Claudius expulsion and Nero's persecutions, Tacitus referring to Nero's actions around the time of the Great Fire of Rome in 64 AD, while Pliny's letters are to Trajan about the trials he was holding for Christians around 111 AD. But the temporal order for the documents begins with Pliny writing around 111 AD, then Tacitus around 115/116 AD and then Suetonius around 122 AD.

== See also ==
- Historicity of Jesus
- Historical Jesus
- Josephus on Jesus
- Lucian on Jesus
- Mara Bar-Serapion
- Mara Bar-Serapion on Jesus

== Bibliography ==
- Barry Baldwin, Suetonius: Biographer of the Caesars. Amsterdam: A. M. Hakkert, 1983 ISBN 9789025608460.
- H. Dixon Slingerland, 'Suetonius "Claudius" 25.4 and the Account in Cassius Dio', JQR 79, 4 (1988) pp. 305–322. (Cassius Dio) JSTOR 1453891
- H. Dixon Slingerland, 'Suetonius Claudius 25.4, Acts 18, and Paulus Orosius's "Historiarum Adversum Paganos Libri VII:" Dating the Claudian Expulsion(s) of Roman Jews', JQR 83, 1/2 (1992) pp. 127–144. (Orosius) JSTOR 1455110
- H. Dixon Slingerland, 'Acts 18:1-18, the Gallio Inscription, and Absolute Pauline Chronology', JBL 110, 3 (1991) pp. 439–449. (Gallio) JSTOR 3267781
- Robert E. Van Voorst, Jesus outside the New Testament: an introduction to the ancient evidence, Wm. B. Eerdmans Publishing, (2000) (Jesus) ISBN 9780802843685
