= Nero's Torches =

1876 painting by Henryk Siemiradzki

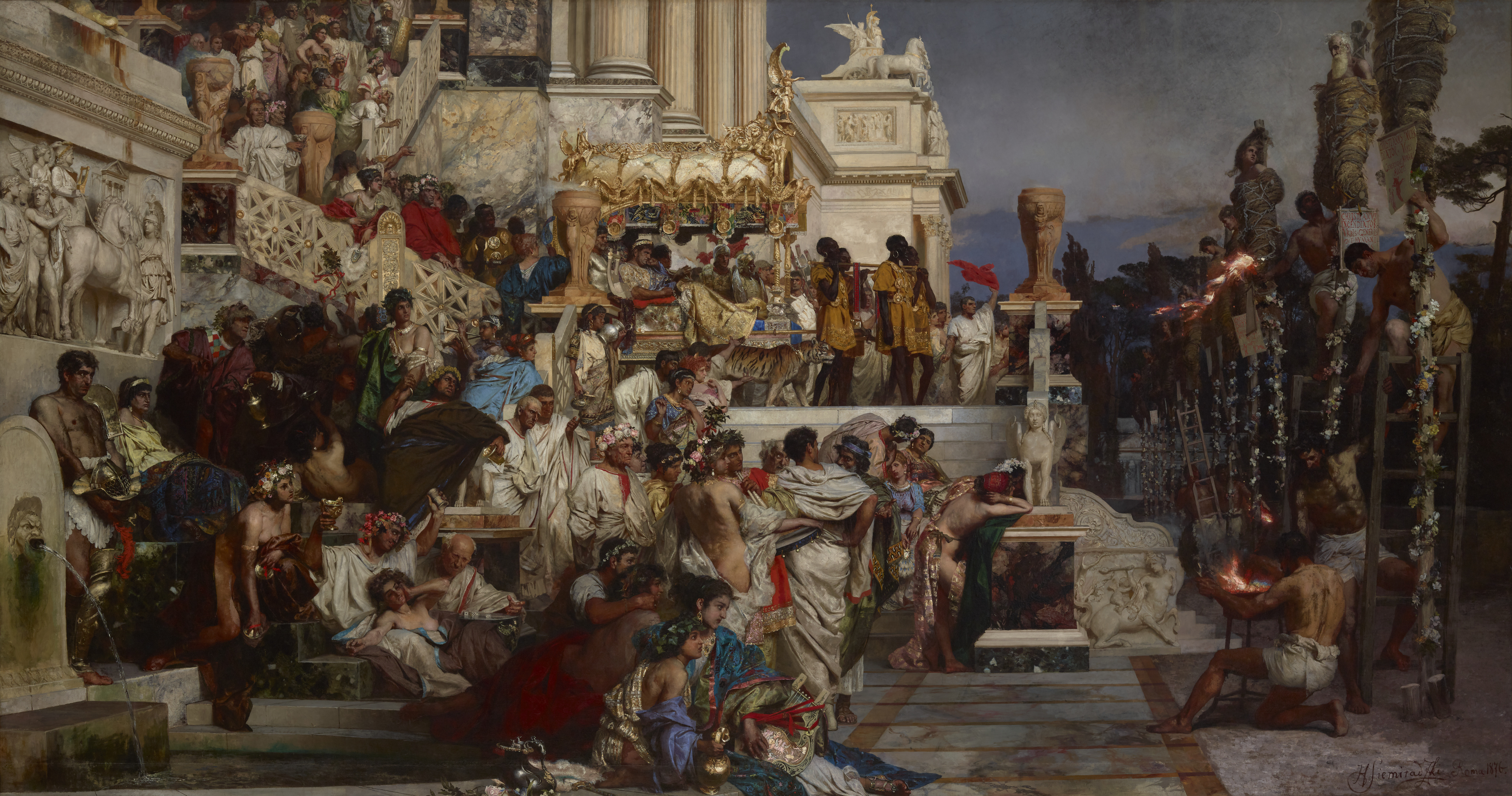
- Artist: Henryk Siemiradzki
- Year: 1876
- Medium: Oil on canvas
- Dimensions: 385 cm × 705 cm (152 in × 278 in)
- Location: National Museum, Kraków

Nero's Torches (Polish: Pochodnie Nerona) is an 1876 oil-on-canvas painting by the Polishartist Henryk Siemiradzki. It is also known as Candlesticks of Christianity (Świeczniki chrześcijaństwa).

== Description ==
It depicts a group of Early Christian martyrs who are about to be burned alive as the alleged perpetrators of the Great Fire of Rome, during the reign of emperor Nero in 64 AD. People from many different social spheres, including the emperor himself, are present to watch the burning, which takes place in front of the Domus Aurea. The motif is based on the descriptions by Suetonius and Tacitus of the torture of Christians, such as the following:

Mockery of every sort was added to their deaths. Covered with the skins of beasts, they were torn by dogs and perished, or were nailed to crosses, or were doomed to the flames and burnt, to serve as a nightly illumination, when daylight had expired. Nero offered his gardens for the spectacle, and was exhibiting a show in the circus, while he mingled with the people in the dress of a charioteer or stood aloft on a car.

Of note is that the signs attached to the feet of the condemned list their alleged crimes, and show the Alexamenos Graffito.

== Reception ==
The painting was first exhibited in 1876 at the Accademia di San Luca in Rome. It went on to tour Europe with stops in Vienna, Munich, Prague, Lviv, Berlin, Saint Petersburg, Poznań, Paris and London. It was met with critical acclaim by masters of academic art such as Hans Makart and Lawrence Alma-Tadema. It has been the target of criticism over Siemiradzki's handling of exterior human beauty by painter and controversial art theoretician Stanisław Witkiewicz opposed to historical realism in general, and the monumental art of Jan Matejko in particular.

Siemiradzki donated Nero's Torches to the recently initiated National Museum in Kraków in 1879 during Józef Ignacy Kraszewski’s anniversary celebrations. With his grant, Siemiradzki inaugurated the national collection. The painting is on display at the Siemiradzki Room of the Sukiennice Museum Gallery of 19th-Century Polish Art, housed at the Renaissance Sukiennice Hall in Main Square, Kraków (listed as UNESCO World Heritage Site since 1978).
