= Mara bar Serapion =

Ancient Syrian author

Mara bar Serapion (Classical Syriac: ܡܪܐ ܒܪ ܣܪܦܝܘܢ), or "Mara son of Serapion", was a Syriac Stoic philosopher in the Roman province of Syria. He is known only from a letter he wrote in Aramaic to his son, who was named Serapion, in which he refers to the execution of "the wise king of the Jews", a phrase some scholars interpret as an early non-Christian reference to Jesus of Nazareth.

The letter indicates that Mara's homeland was Samosata, i.e. modern-day Samsat, Turkey (on the west bank of the Euphrates), but his captivity appears to have been in Seleucia, in modern-day Iraq (on the west bank of the Tigris River).

Mara's captivity took place after the AD 72 annexation of Samosata by the Romans, but before the third century. According to Robert Van Voorst, most scholars date it to shortly after AD 73 during the first century but Van Voorst himself states that "…we may with some safety conclude that a date in the second half of the second century is the more probable".

== The letter to his son ==
Mara's letter to his son begins with: "Mara, son of Serapion, to Serapion, my son: peace." The letter was composed sometime between 73 AD and the 3rd century. There were three cases when captives were taken from Samosata, in 72 AD by the Romans, in 161/162 by Parthians and in 256 by Sasanians and various scholars have presented arguments for each date. Robert Van Voorst (who himself thinks the letter was composed in the second century) states that most scholars date the letter to shortly after AD 73 during the first century.

The letter is preserved in a 6th- or 7th-century manuscript (BL Add. 14658) held by the British Library. Nineteenth-century records state that the manuscript containing this text was one of several manuscripts obtained by Henry Tattam from the monastery of St. Mary Deipara in the Nitrian Desert of Egypt and acquired by the Library in 1843.

== Mara's religion ==
A number of scholars such as Sebastian Brock, Fergus Millar, Ute Possekel, and Craig A. Evans, among others, state that Mara was a pagan. Gerd Theissen states that Mara's reference to "our gods" indicates that he was neither a Jew nor a Christian, the letter stating:

Thou hast heard, moreover, concerning our companions, that, when they were leaving Samosata, they were distressed about it, and, as if complaining of the time in which their lot was cast, said thus: "We are now far removed from our home, and we cannot return again to our city, or behold our people, or offer to our gods the greeting of praise."

Walter A. Elwell and Robert W. Yarbrough state that Mara was unlikely to have been a Christian. Robert E. Van Voorst notes that the phrase "our gods" appears only once in a quotation of Mara's fellow captives, leaving open the possibility that Mara himself may have been a monotheist. Van Voorst adds two factors that indicate Mara was not a Christian, the first being his failure to mention the terms Jesus or Christ. The second factor (also supported by Bruce Chilton and Craig A. Evans) is that Mara's statement that Jesus lives on based on the wisdom of his teachings, in contrast to the Christian concept that Jesus continues to live through his resurrection, indicates that he was not a Christian.

Chilton and Evans also state that Mara's use of the term "wise king" to refer to Jesus, rather than a religious designation, indicates that his understanding of the events was formed through non-Christian sources. They state that the term "king of the Jews" has never been seen in the Christian literature of antiquity as a title for Jesus.

== Mara's philosophical stance ==
The letter draws on Greek learning.

The last paragraph of Mara's letter states:

One of his friends asked Mara, son of Serapion, when in bonds at his side: “Nay, by thy life, Mara, tell me what cause of laughter thou hast seen, that thou laughest.” “I am laughing,” said Mara, “at Time: inasmuch as, although he has not borrowed any evil from me, he is paying me back.”

Ilaria Ramelli, who holds that Mara lived towards the end of the first century, states that his letter has strong stoic elements.

== See also ==
- Stoicism
