= Pilate stone =

1st-century stone with inscription mentioning Pontius Pilate

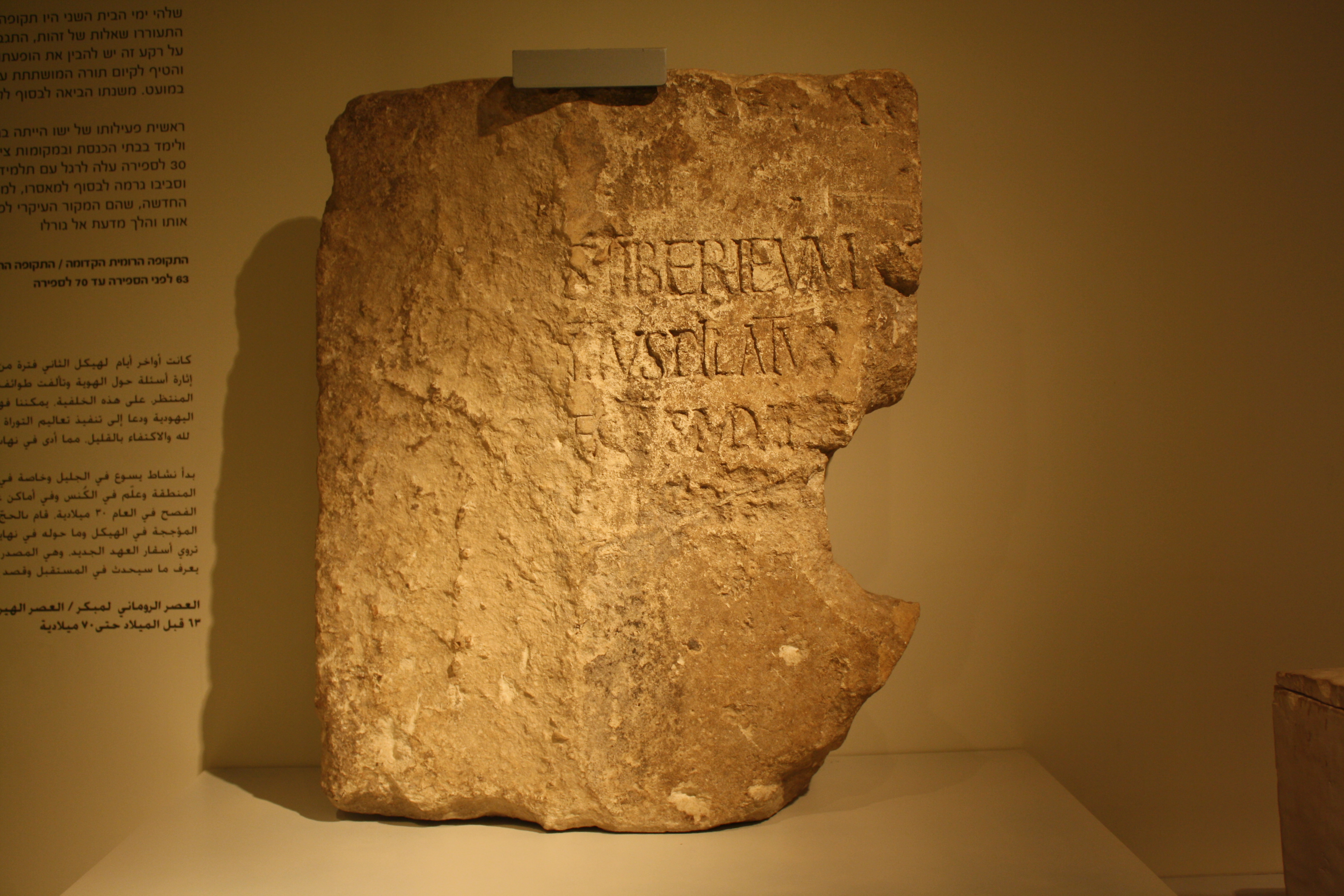
- Pontius Pilate inscription; the original stone, now located in the Israel Museum in Jerusalem
- Material: Limestone
- Height: 82 cm
- Width: 65 cm
- Writing: Classical Latin
- Created: c. 1st century AD
- Discovered: 1961; Caesarea, Israel
- Present location: Israel Museum
- Identification: AE 1963 number 104

The Pilate stone is a damaged block of carved limestone, with dimensions 82 cm × 65 cm (32 in × 26 in), which bears a partially intact inscription attributed to Pontius Pilate, a prefect of the Roman province of Judaea in the 1st century AD. It was discovered at the archaeological site of Caesarea Maritima in 1961.

== Description ==
The limestone block was discovered in June 1961 by Italian archaeologist Maria Teresa Fortuna Canivet during a campaign led by Antonio Frova while excavating in the area of an ancient theatre built by decree of Herod the Great c. 22–10 BC, along with the entire city of Caesarea. The artifact is a fragment of the dedicatory inscription of a later building, probably a temple, that was constructed in the 1st century AD. – possibly in honour of the emperor Tiberius. The stone was then reused in the 4th century as a building block for a set of stairs belonging to a structure erected behind the stage house of the Herodian theatre, where archaeologists discovered it, still attached to the ancient staircase.

The artifact is particularly significant because it is an archaeological find of an authentic 1st-century Roman inscription mentioning the name "[Pon]tius Pilatus". It is contemporary to Pilate's lifetime and accords with what is known of his reported career. In effect, the inscription constitutes the earliest surviving and only contemporary record of Pilate, who is otherwise known from the New Testament and apocryphal texts, the Jewish historian Josephus, writer Philo, and brief references by Roman historians such as Tacitus.

It is likely that Pontius Pilate made his base at Caesarea Maritima, the site where the stone was discovered, since that city had replaced Jerusalem as the administrative capital and military headquarters of the province in AD 6. Pilate probably travelled to Jerusalem, the central city of the province's Jewish population, only when necessary.

The Pilate stone is currently held at the Israel Museum in Jerusalem. Plaster-cast replicas can be found at the Archaeological Museum in Milan, Italy, and on display in Caesarea Maritima.

== Inscription ==
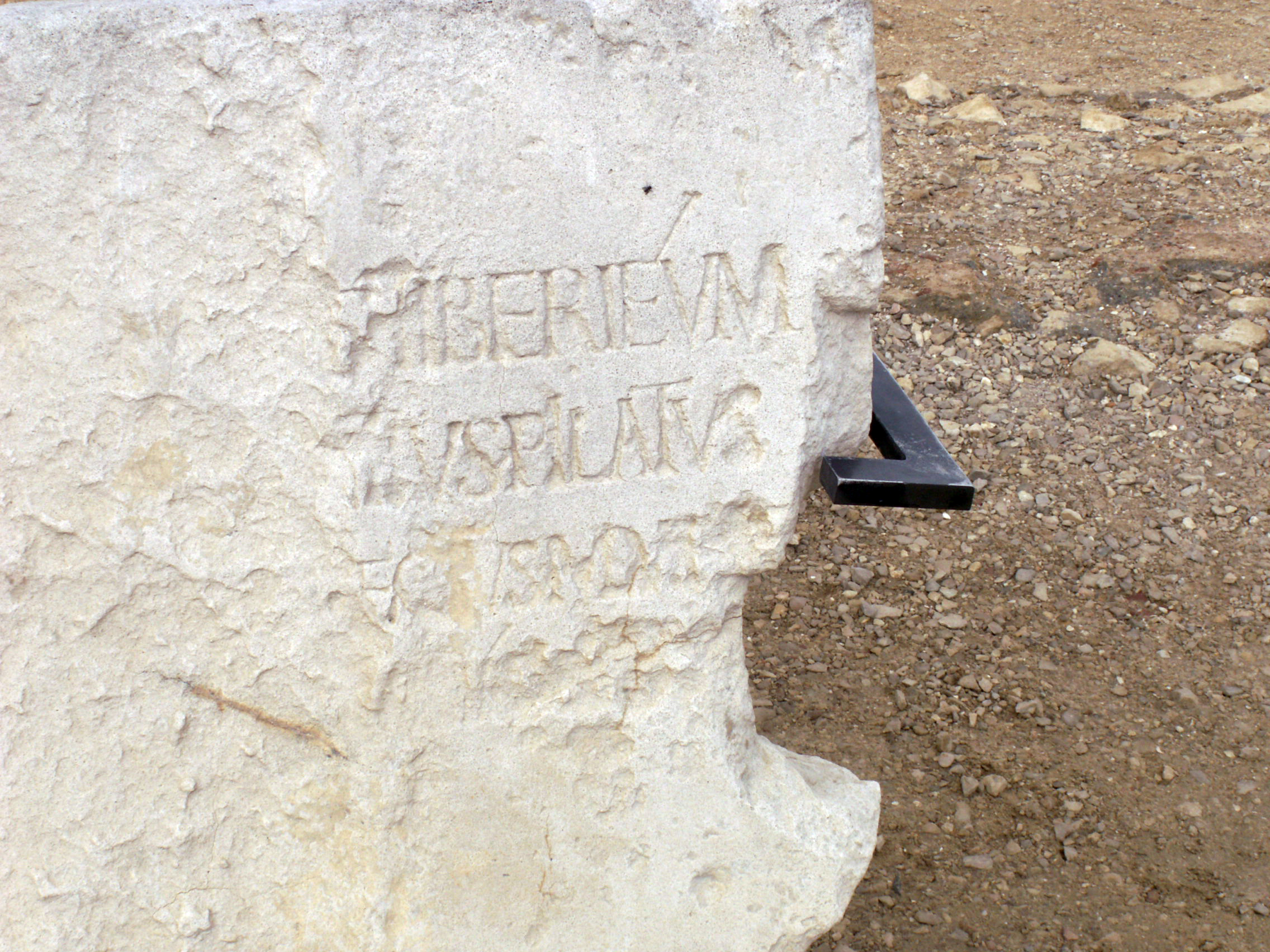
Replica casting on display in Caesarea Maritima

On the partially damaged block is a dedication to the deified Augustus and Livia (the Augustan gods or "Divine Augusti"), the stepfather and mother of emperor Tiberius, originally placed within a Tiberieum, probably a temple dedicated to Tiberius. It has been deemed authentic because it was discovered in the coastal town of Caesarea, which was the capital of Iudaea Province during the time Pontius Pilate was Roman governor.

The partial inscription reads (conjectural letters in brackets):

[DIS AUGUSTI]S TIBERIÉUM
[...PONTI]US PILATUS
[...PRAEF]ECTUS IUDA[EA]E
[...FECIT D]E[DICAVIT]

The translation from Latin to English for the reconstructed inscription reads:

To the Divine Augusti [this] Tiberieum
...Pontius Pilate
...prefect of Judea
...has dedicated [this]
