= Robert E. Van Voorst =

American theologian and educator (born 1952)

Robert E. Van Voorst (born June 5, 1952) is an American theologian, educator, Christian apologist and former pastor.

He retired in 2018 as a Professor of New Testament Studies at Western Theological Seminary, in Holland, Michigan, and has published scholarly works in early Christian writings and New Testament Greek. He received his B.A. in Religion from Hope College in Holland, Michigan, his M.Div. from Western Theological Seminary, and his Ph.D. in New Testament from Union Theological Seminary in New York City. He has served at Lycoming College (Methodist) in Williamsport, PA, and was a visiting professor at Westminster College, Oxford, England. He has lectured to PhD students in Zhejiang University, Hangzhou, China, on methods in biblical study.

Van Voorst has also served as a supply pastor at various PC (USA) churches in north-central Pennsylvania, and for twelve years as pastor at Rochester Reformed Church, New York.

== Works ==
=== Jesus Outside the New Testament ===
In Jesus Outside the New Testament (2000), Van Voorst starts by outlining the history of research into extra-Biblical sources for the historical Jesus and its relation to the hypothesis that Jesus did not exist, which he notes is generally rejected by modern scholars. He goes on to consider references to Jesus in classical writings, Jewish writings, hypothetical sources of the canonical Gospels, and extant Christian writings outside the New Testament. The book includes translations of key passages discussed, including the entire Gospel of Thomas. Van Voorst concludes that non-Christian sources provide "a small but certain corroboration of certain New Testament historical traditions on the family background, time of life, ministry, and death of Jesus", as well as "evidence of the content of Christian preaching that is independent of the New Testament", while extra-biblical Christian sources give access to "some important information about the earliest traditions on Jesus". However, New Testament sources remain central for "both the main lines and the details about Jesus' life and teaching".

Allen Kerkeslager called the book a "marvelous achievement" and commended its clear organization. He criticised Van Voorst for using divergences from the canonical Gospels as evidence against the historical value of the New Testament apocrypha, but noted that the author usually offered additional grounds for his conclusions. Darrell L. Bock called the book "an excellent up-to-date survey", "careful and thorough". Helen E. Bond considered Van Voorst's treatment of the New Testament apocrypha particularly strong, while Curt Niccum found his book generally useful but least good on Jewish literature. G. Van Belle criticised Van Voorst's assignment of John 20:20–20:21 to the Signs Gospel against the verdict of two authors cited in the book.

Van Voorst's attitude towards the New Testament provoked divergent judgments. Thomas O'Loughlin, while concluding that the book was up-to-date and generally balanced, thought that an apologetic agenda had led Van Voorst to place the New Testament "almost outside of history" and to simplistically classify non-canonical Christian texts as "gnostic". On the other hand, some reviewers in Evangelical journals criticised what they saw as an over-skeptical attitude towards the New Testament, in one case recommending works by F. F. Bruce and Gary Habermas as superior in this respect.

Raphael Lataster has criticized Van Voorst's appeal to hypothetical sources for the canonical Gospels, and, in particular, his failure to prove that such sources existed and/or are reliable. He notes that Van Voorst seems to recognise that his method is problematic as he understands that many of such sources are fabricated and that they remain hypothetical.

== Bibliography ==
- Jesus Outside the New Testament: An Introduction to the Ancient Evidence (2000) ISBN 978-0-8028-4368-5
- Anthology of World Scriptures (ninth edition, 2018)
- Reading the New Testament Today (2004)
- Building Your New Testament Greek Vocabulary (Resources for Biblical Study) (third edition, 2001)
- Readings in Christianity (3rd Edition) (2005)
- Anthology of Asian Scriptures (2000)
- The Death Of Jesus In Early Christianity with John T. Carroll, Joel B. Green, and Joel Marcus. (1995)
- The Ascents of James: History and Theology of a Jewish-Christian Community (Dissertation Series * (Society of Biblical Literature)) (1989)
- "RELG: World" (4th edition, 2019)
- Commonly Misunderstood Verses in the Bible: What They Really Mean (2017)
