= Persecution of Christians in the Roman Empire =

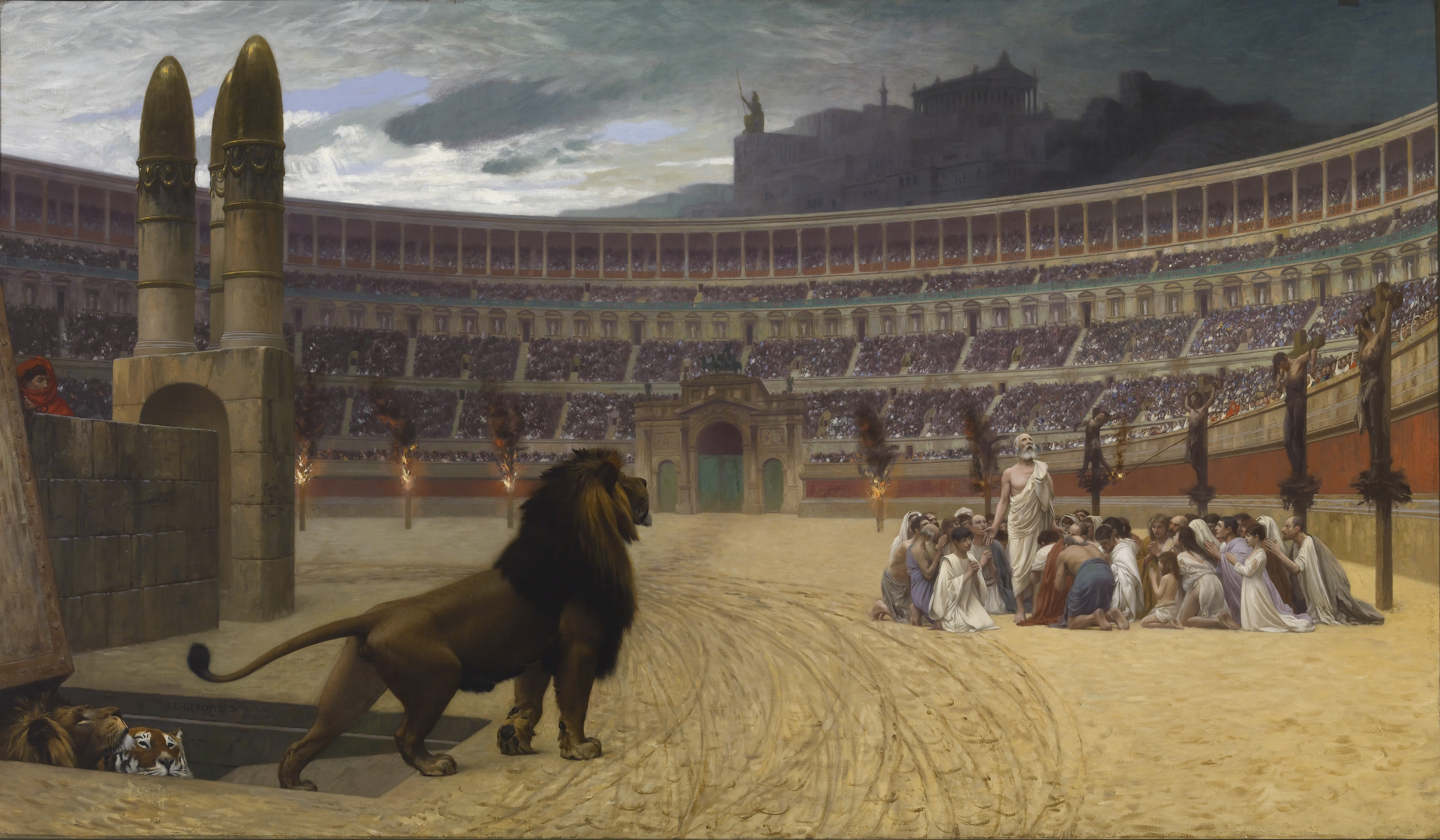
The Christian Martyrs' Last Prayer, by Jean-Léon Gérôme (1883)

Early Christians were heavily persecuted throughout the Roman Empire until the early 4th century. Although Christianity initially emerged as a small Jewish movement in 1st-century Judaea, it quickly branched off as a separate religion and began spreading across the various Roman territories at a pace that put it at odds with the well-established Roman imperial cult, to which it stood in opposition; Christians were vocal in their expressions of abhorrence towards the beliefs and practices of Roman paganism, such as deifying and making ritual sacrifices to the Roman emperor or partaking in other methods of idolatry. Consequently, the Roman state and other members of civic society routinely punished Christians for treason, various rumoured crimes, illegal assembly, and for introducing an alien cult that drove many Roman people to apostasy in favour of Jesus Christ.

According to Tacitus, the first wave of organized persecution occurred under Nero (r. 54–68), who blamed Christians for the Great Fire of Rome in 64. A number of mostly localized persecutions occurred during the reign of Marcus Aurelius (r. 161–180). After a lull, persecution resumed under Decius (r. 249–251) and Trebonianus Gallus (r. 251–253). The Decian persecution was particularly extensive, as Decius strived to restore the Roman golden age in part by forcing pagan practices upon the Christian community. Another wave of persecution began under Valerian (r. 253–260), but ceased abruptly after he was captured and taken prisoner by the Sasanian Empire during the Battle of Edessa of the Roman–Persian Wars. Under his successor Gallienus (r. 253–268), whose reign was marred by rapidly escalating military conflicts of the Crisis of the Third Century, the first ever decree of tolerance was issued for Christian practices and places of worship, although it stopped short of recognizing Christianity as a religion with legal status.

Emperor Diocletian (r. 283–305) began the Diocletianic persecution, which was the final and the most severe wave of persecution of Christians by the Roman state. It was enforced until the accession of Galerius (r. 305–311), who issued the Edict of Serdica, and the death of Maximinus Daza (r. 310–313). After Constantine the Great (r. 306–337) defeated his rival Maxentius (r. 306–312) at the Battle of the Milvian Bridge in October 312, he and his co-emperor Licinius issued the Edict of Milan, which decriminalized Christianity and suppressed pagan populations throughout the Roman Empire. In 380, Theodosius I (r. 379–395) issued the Edict of Thessalonica, officially establishing Christianity as the Roman state religion. It was also during the reign of Theodosius I that pagan practices were overtly deemed punishable offenses, which laid the framework for early Byzantine anti-pagan policies.

== Religion in Roman society ==
Roman religion at the beginning of the Roman Empire (27 BC – 476) was polytheistic and local. Each city worshipped its own set of gods and goddesses that had originally been derived from ancient Greece and become Romanized. This polis-religion was embedded in, and inseparable from, "the general structures of the ancient city; there was no religious identity separate from political or civic identity, and the essence of religion lay in ritual rather than belief". Private religion and its public practices were under the control of public officials, primarily, the Senate. Religion was central to being Roman, its practices widespread, and intertwined with politics.

Support for this form of traditional Roman polytheism had begun to decline by the first century BC when it was seen, according to various writers and historians of the time, as having become empty and ineffectual. A combination of external factors such as war and invasions, and internal factors such as the formal nature and political manipulation of traditional religion, is said to have created the slow decline of polytheism. This left a vacuum in the personal lives of people that they filled with other forms of worship: such as the imperial cult, various mystery cults, imported eastern religions, and Christianity.

The Roman approach to empire building included a cultural permeability that allowed foreigners to become a part of it, but the Roman religious practice of adopting foreign gods and practices into its pantheon did not apply equally to all gods: "Many divinities were brought to Rome and installed as part of the Roman state religion, but a great many more were not". This characteristic openness has led many, such as Ramsay MacMullen to say that in its process of expansion, the Roman Empire was "completely tolerant, in heaven as on earth", but to also go on and immediately add: "That [tolerance] was only half the story".

MacMullen says the most significant factor in determining whether one received 'tolerance' or 'intolerance' from Roman religion was if that religion honored one's god "according to ancestral custom". Christians were thought of badly for abandoning their ancestral roots in Judaism. However, how religion was practised was also a factor. Roman officials had become suspicious of the worshippers of Dionysus and their practice of Bacchanalia as far back as 186 BC because it "took place at night". Private divination, astrology, and 'Chaldean practices' were magics associated with night worship, and as such, had carried the threat of banishment and execution since the early imperial period. Archaeologist Luke Lavan explains that is because night worship was private and secret and associated with treason and secret plots against the emperor. Bacchic associations were dissolved, leaders were arrested and executed, women were forbidden to hold important positions in the cult, no Roman citizen could be a priest, and strict control of the cult was thereafter established.

This became the pattern for the Roman state's response to whatever was seen as a religious threat. In the first century of the common era, there were "periodic expulsions of astrologers, philosophers and even teachers of rhetoric... as well as Jews and...the cult of Isis". Druids also received the same treatment, as did Christians.

== Reasons, causes, and contributing factors ==
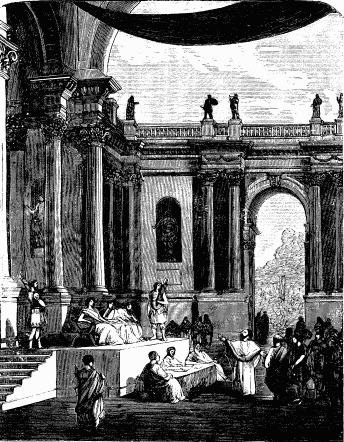
"Roman Hall of Justice", Young Folks' History of Rome, 1878

=== Reasons ===
A. N. Sherwin-White records that serious discussion of the reasons for Roman persecution of Christians began in 1890 when it produced "20 years of controversy" and three main opinions: first, there was the theory held by most French and Belgian scholars that "there was a general enactment, precisely formulated and valid for the whole empire, which forbade the practice of the Christian religion. The origin of this is most commonly attributed to Nero, but sometimes to Domitian". This has evolved into a 'common law' theory which gives great weight to Tertullian's description of prosecution resulting from the 'accusation of the Name', as being Nero's plan. Nero had an older resolution forbidding the introduction of new religions, but the application to Christians is seen as coming from the much older Republican principle that it was a capital offense to introduce a new superstition without the authorization of the Roman state. Sherwin-White adds that this theory might explain persecution in Rome, but it fails to explain it in the provinces. For that, a second theory is needed.

The second theory, which originated with German scholars, and is the best-known theory to English readers, is that of coercion (curtailment). It holds that Christians were punished by Roman governors through the ordinary use of their power to keep order because Christians had introduced "an alien cult which induced 'national apostasy', [and] the abandonment of the traditional Roman religion. Others substituted for this a general aversion to the established order and disobedience to constituted authority. All of [this] school seem to envisage the procedure as a direct police action, or inquisition against notable malefactors, arrest, and punishment, without the ordinary forms of trial".

A third school asserted that Christians were prosecuted for specific criminal offenses such as child murder, incest, magic, illegal assembly, and treason—a charge based on their refusal to worship the divinity of the Roman emperor. Sherwin-White says "this third opinion has usually been combined with the coercion theory, but some scholars have attributed all Christian persecution to a single criminal charge, notably treason, or illegal assembly, or the introduction of an alien cult".Although malicious rumors did exist, this theory has been the least verified of the three by later scholarship.

=== Social and religious causes ===
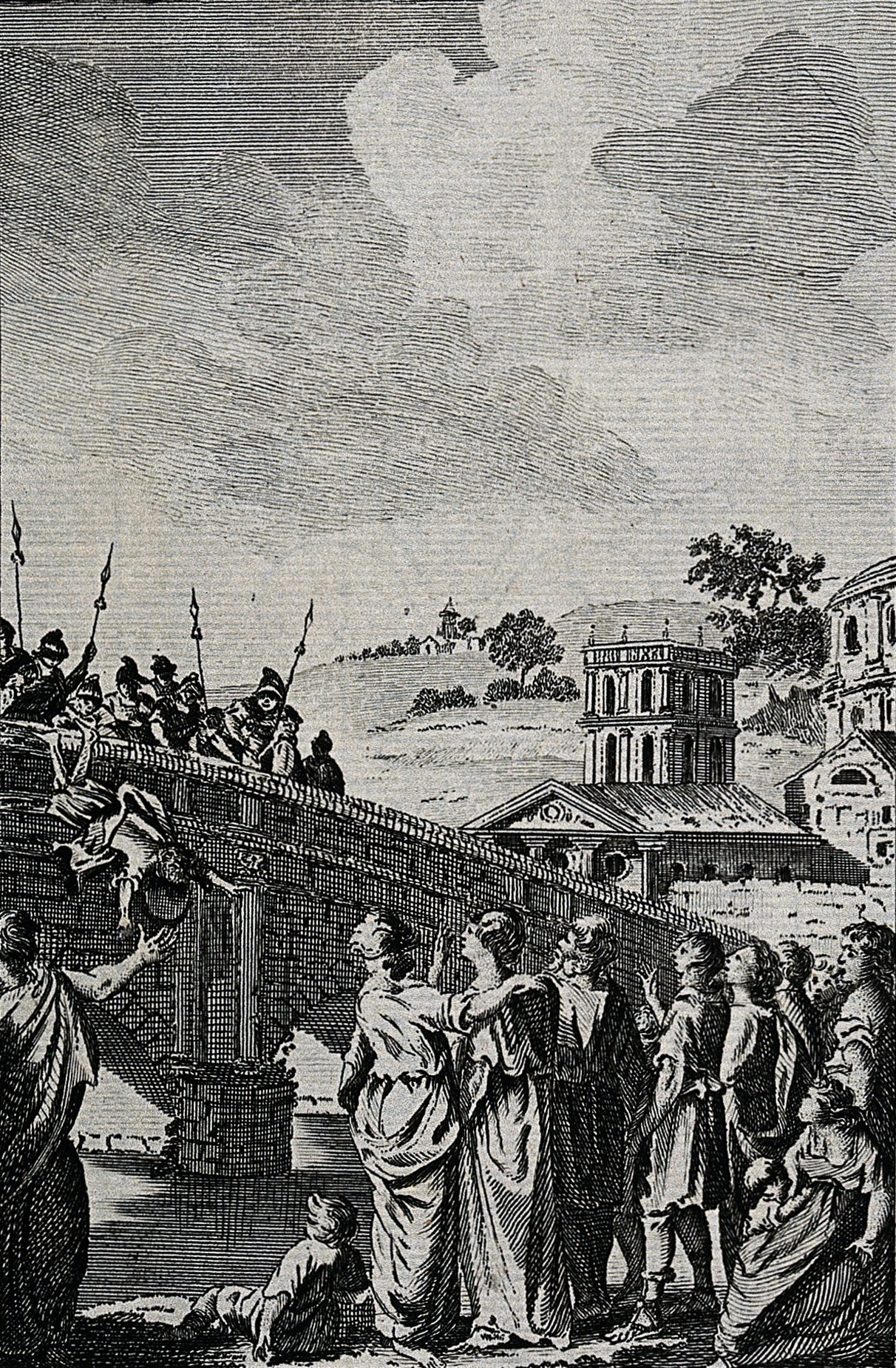
Martyrdom of Calepodius (intaglio print)

==== Ideological conflict ====
Joseph Plescia says persecution was caused by an ideological conflict. Caesar was seen as divine. Christians could accept only one divinity, and it wasn't Caesar. Cairns describes the ideological conflict as: "The exclusive sovereignty of Christ clashed with Caesar's claims to his own exclusive sovereignty."

In this clash of ideologies, "the ordinary Christian lived under a constant threat of denunciation and the possibility of arraignment on capital charges". Joseph Bryant asserts it was not easy for Christians to hide their religion and pretend to Romanness either, since renunciation of the world was an aspect of their faith that demanded "numerous departures from conventional norms and pursuits". The Christian had exacting moral standards that included avoiding contact with those that still lay in bondage to "the Evil One" (2 Corinthians 6:1-18; 1 John 2: 15-18; Revelation 18: 4; II Clement 6; Epistle of Barnabas, 1920). Life as a Christian required daily courage, "with the radical choice of Christ or the world being forced upon the believer in countless ways".

Christian attendance at civic festivals, athletic games, and theatrical performances were fraught with danger, since in addition to the 'sinful frenzy' and 'debauchery' aroused, each was held in honor of pagan deities. Various occupations and careers were regarded as inconsistent with Christian principles, most notably military service and public office, the manufacturing of idols, and of course all pursuits which affirmed polytheistic culture, such as music, acting, and school-teaching (cf. Hippolytus, Apostolic Tradition 16). Even the wearing of jewelry and fine apparel was judged harshly by Christian moralists and ecclesiastical officials, as was the use of cosmetics and perfumes.

In Rome, citizens were expected to demonstrate their loyalty to Rome by participating in the rites of the state religion which had numerous feast days, processions and offerings throughout the year. Christians simply could not, and so they were seen as belonging to an illicit religion that was anti-social and subversive.

==== Privatizing ====
McDonald explains that the privatizing of religion was another factor in persecution as "Christians moved their activities from the streets to the more secluded domains of houses, shops and women's apartments, severing the normal ties between religion, tradition and public institutions like cities and nations".

McDonald adds that Christians sometimes

met at night, in secret, and this also aroused suspicion among the pagan population accustomed to religion as a public event; rumours abounded that Christians committed flagitia, scelera, and maleficia— "outrageous crimes", "wickedness", and "evil deeds", specifically, cannibalism and incest (referred to as "Thyestian banquets" and "Oedipodean intercourse") — due to their rumoured practices of eating the "blood and body" of Christ and referring to each other as "brothers" and "sisters".

==== Inclusivity ====
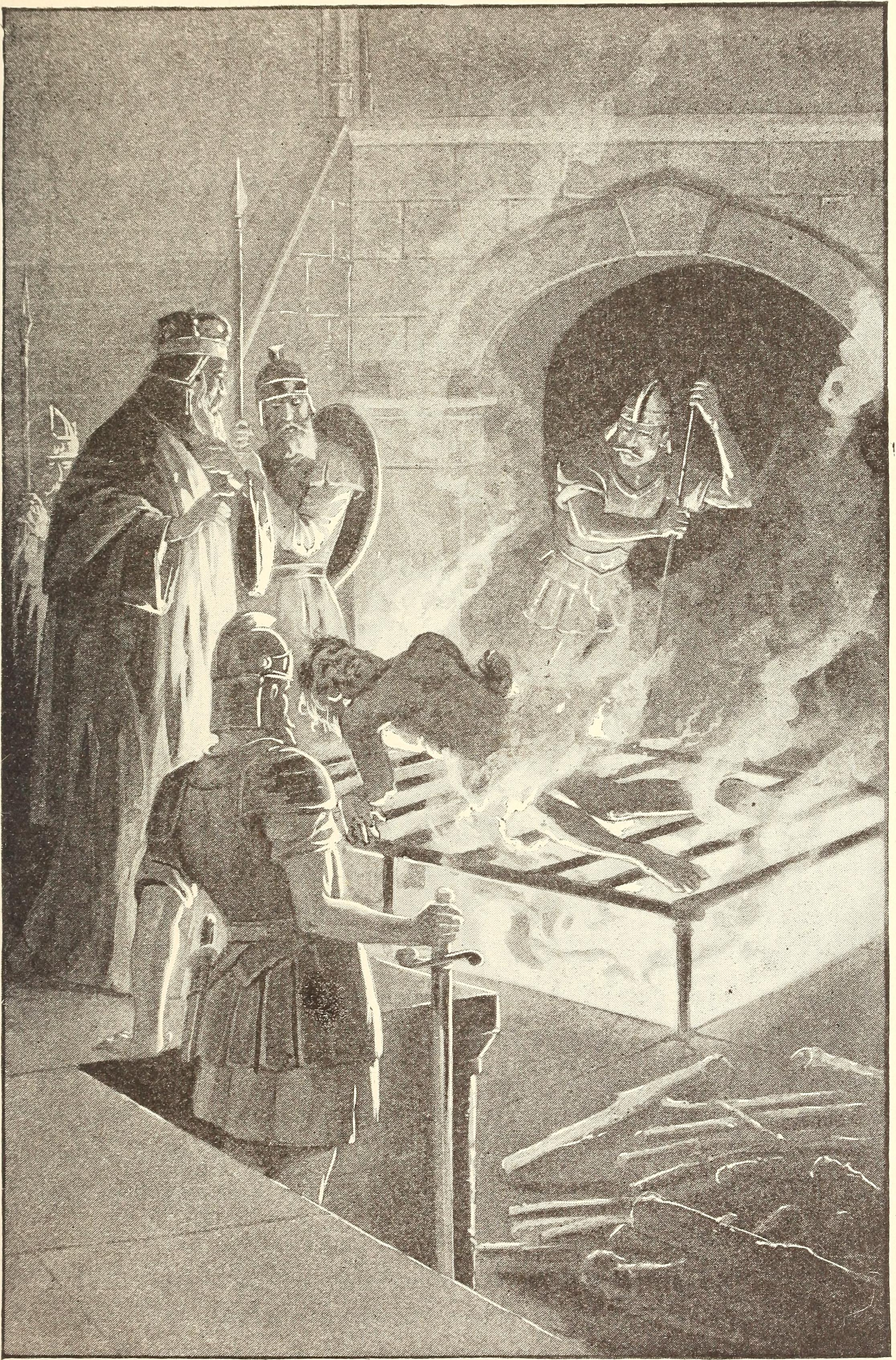
Martyrdom of Saint Lawrence (Christian heroes and martyrs, 1895)

Early Christian communities were highly inclusive in terms of social stratification and other social categories, much more so than were the Roman voluntary associations. Heterogeneity characterized the groups formed by Paul the Apostle, and the role of women was much greater than in either of the forms of Judaism or paganism in existence at the time. Early Christians were told to love others, even enemies, and Christians of all classes and sorts called each other "brother" and "sister". This inclusivity of various social classes and backgrounds stems from early Christian beliefs in the importance of performing missionary work among Jews and gentiles in hopes of converting to a new way of life in accordance of gospel standards (Mark 16:15–16, Galatians 5:16–26). This was perceived by the opponents of Christianity as a "disruptive and, most significantly, a competitive menace to the traditional class/gender-based order of Roman society".

==== Exclusivity ====
Edward Gibbon argued that the tendency of Christian converts to renounce their family and country, (and their frequent predictions of impending disasters), instilled a feeling of apprehension in their pagan neighbors. He wrote:

By embracing the faith of the Gospel the Christians incurred the supposed guilt of an unnatural and unpardonable offense. They dissolved the sacred ties of custom and education, violated the religious institutions of their country, and presumptuously despised whatever their fathers had believed as true, or had reverenced as sacred.

==== Rejection of paganism ====
Many pagans believed that bad things would happen if the established pagan gods were not properly propitiated and reverenced. Bart Ehrman says that: "By the end of the second century, the Christian apologist Tertullian complained about the widespread perception that Christians were the source of all disasters brought against the human race by the gods.

They think the Christians the cause of every public disaster, of every affliction with which the people are visited. If the Tiber rises as high as the city walls, if the Nile does not send its waters up over the fields, if the heavens give no rain, if there is an earthquake, if there is famine or pestilence, straightway the cry is, 'Away with the Christians to the lions!"

==== Roman identity ====
Roman religion was largely what determined Romanness. The Christian refusal to sacrifice to the Roman gods was seen as an act of defiance against this cultural and political character and the very nature of Rome itself. MacMullen quotes Eusebius as having written that the pagans "have thoroughly persuaded themselves that they act rightly and that we are guilty of the greatest impiety". According to Wilken, "The polytheistic worldview of the Romans did not incline them to understand a refusal to worship, even symbolically, the state gods.". MacMullen explains this meant Christians were "constantly on the defensive", and although they responded with appeals to philosophy and reason and anything they thought might weigh against ta patria (the ancestral customs), they could not practice Roman religion and continue fealty to their own religion. Abel Bibliowicz says that, amongst the Romans, "The prejudice became so instinctive that eventually, mere confession of the name 'Christian' could be sufficient grounds for execution".

=== Contributing factors ===
==== Roman legal system ====
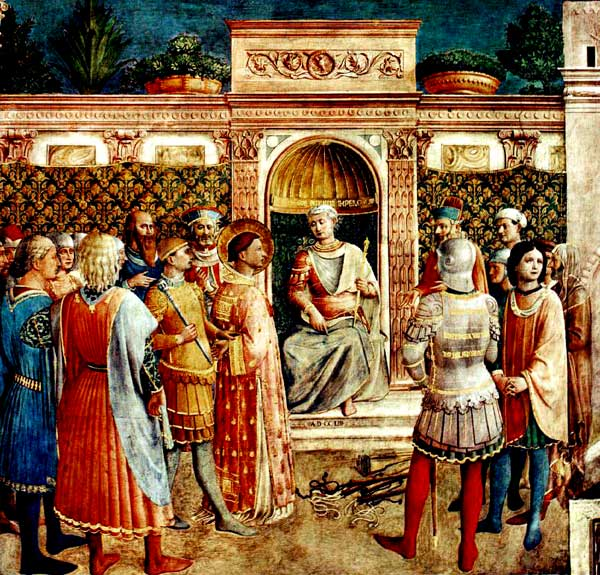
The Condemnation of Saint Lawrence by the emperor Valerian (Fra Angelico, c. 1450)

Historian Joyce E. Salisbury points out that "The random nature of the persecutions between 64 and 203 has led to much discussion about what constituted the legal basis for the persecutions, and the answer has remained somewhat elusive". Candida Moss says there is "scant" evidence of martyrdom when using Roman Law as the measure. Historian Joseph Plescia asserts that the first evidence of Roman law concerning Christians is that of Trajan. T. D. Barnes and Ste. Croix both argue there was no Roman law concerning the Christians before Decius and the third century; Barnes agrees that the central fact of the juridical basis of the persecutions is Trajan's rescript to Pliny; after Trajan's rescript, (if not before), Christianity became a crime in a special category.

Other scholars trace the precedent for killing Christians to Nero. Barnes explains that, though there was no Roman law, there was "ample precedent for suppressing foreign superstitions" prior to Nero. Precedent was based on the strong feeling that only the ancestral Gods ought to be worshipped. Such feeling could "acquire the force of law", since the ancestral customs—the Mos maiorum—were the most important source of Roman law. In Joseph Bryant's view, "Nero's mass executions ... set [such] a precedent, and thereafter the mere fact of 'being a Christian' was sufficient for state officials to impose capital punishment".

Barnes says "Keresztes, goes so far as to claim that 'there is today an almost general agreement that the Christians, under normal circumstances, were not tried on the basis of either the ius coercitionis [(the governor's 'power of arrest')], or the general criminal law, but on the basis of a special law introduced during Nero's rule, proscribing Christians as such". This theory gives great weight to Tertullian, and Nero's older resolution forbidding the introduction of new religions, and the even older Republican principle that it was a capital offense to introduce a new superstition without the authorization of the Roman state.

Bryant agrees, adding, "This situation is strikingly illustrated in the famous correspondence between Emperor Trajan (98–117) and Pliny the Younger". Trajan's correspondence with Pliny does indeed show that Christians were being executed for being Christian before AD 110, yet Pliny's letters also show there was no empire–wide Roman law, making Christianity a crime, that was generally known at that time. Herbert Musurillo, translator and scholar of The Acts of the Christian martyr's Introduction says Ste. Croix asserted the governor's special powers were all that was needed.

Due to the informal and personality-driven nature of the Roman legal system, nothing "other than a prosecutor" (an accuser, including a member of the public, not only a holder of an official position), "a charge of Christianity, and a governor willing to punish on that charge" was required to bring a legal case against a Christian. Roman law was largely concerned with property rights, leaving many gaps in criminal and public law. Thus the process cognition extra ordinem ("special investigation") filled the legal void left by both code and court. All provincial governors had the right to run trials in this way as part of their imperium in the province.

In cognitio extra ordinem, an accuser called a delator brought before the governor an individual to be charged with a certain offense—in this case, that of being a Christian. This delator was prepared to act as the prosecutor for the trial, and could be rewarded with some of the accused's property if he made an adequate case or charged with calumnia (malicious prosecution) if his case was insufficient. If the governor agreed to hear the case—and he was free not to—he oversaw the trial from start to finish: he heard the arguments, decided on the verdict, and passed the sentence. Many Christians did everything short of offering themselves up for punishment, e.g., Vettius Epagathus, and the hearings of such voluntary martyrs were conducted in the same way.

More often than not, the outcome of the case was wholly subject to the governor's personal opinion. While some tried to rely on precedent or imperial opinion where they could, as evidenced by Pliny the Younger's letter to Trajan concerning the Christians, such guidance was often unavailable. In many cases months' and weeks' travel away from Rome, these governors had to make decisions about running their provinces according to their own instincts and knowledge.

Even if these governors had easy access to the city, they would not have found much official legal guidance on the matter of the Christians. Before the anti-Christian policies under Decius beginning in 250, there was no empire-wide edict against the Christians, and the only solid precedent was that set by Trajan in his reply to Pliny: the name of "Christian" alone was sufficient grounds for punishment and Christians were not to be sought out by the government. There is speculation that Christians were also condemned for contumacia—disobedience toward the magistrate, akin to the modern "contempt of court"—but the evidence on this matter is mixed. Melito of Sardis later asserted that Antoninus Pius ordered that Christians were not to be executed without proper trial.

Given the lack of guidance and distance of imperial supervision, the outcomes of the trials of Christians varied widely. Many followed Pliny's formula: they asked if the accused individuals were Christians, gave those who answered in the affirmative a chance to recant, and offered those who denied or recanted a chance to prove their sincerity by making a sacrifice to the Roman gods and swearing by the emperor's genius. Those who persisted were executed.

According to the Christian apologist Tertullian, some governors in Africa helped accused Christians secure acquittals or refused to bring them to trial. Overall, Roman governors were more interested in making apostates than martyrs: one proconsul of Asia, Arrius Antoninus, when confronted with a group of voluntary martyrs during one of his assize tours, sent a few to be executed and snapped at the rest, "If you want to die, you wretches, you can use ropes or precipices."

During the Great Persecution which lasted from 303 to 312/313, governors were given direct edicts from the emperor. Christian churches and texts were to be destroyed, meeting for Christian worship was forbidden, and those Christians who refused to recant lost their legal rights. Later, it was ordered that Christian clergy be arrested and that all inhabitants of the empire sacrifice to the gods. Still, no specific punishment was prescribed by these edicts and governors retained the leeway afforded to them by distance. Lactantius reported that some governors claimed to have shed no Christian blood, and there is evidence that others turned a blind eye to evasions of the edict or only enforced it when absolutely necessary.

==== Government motivation ====
When a governor was sent to a province, he was charged with the task of keeping it pacata atque quieta—settled and orderly. His primary interest would be to keep the populace happy; thus when unrest against the Christians arose in his jurisdiction, he would be inclined to placate it with appeasement lest the populace "vent itself in riots and lynching."

Political leaders in the Roman Empire were also public cult leaders. Roman religion revolved around public ceremonies and sacrifices; personal belief was not as central an element as it is in many modern faiths. Thus while the private beliefs of Christians may have been largely immaterial to many Roman elites, this public religious practice was in their estimation critical to the social and political well-being of both the local community and the empire as a whole. Honoring tradition in the right way—pietas—was key to stability and success. Hence the Romans protected the integrity of cults practiced by communities under their rule, seeing it as inherently correct to honor one's ancestral traditions; for this reason the Romans for a long time tolerated the highly exclusive Jewish sect, even though some Romans despised it.

Historian H. H. Ben-Sasson has proposed that the "Crisis under Caligula" (37–41) was the "first open break" between Rome and the Jews. After the First Jewish–Roman War (66–73), Jews were officially allowed to practice their religion as long as they paid the Jewish tax. There is debate among historians over whether the Roman government simply saw Christians as a sect of Judaism prior to Nerva's modification of the tax in 96. From then on, practicing Jews paid the tax while Christians did not, providing hard evidence of an official distinction. Part of the Roman disdain for Christianity, then, arose in large part from the sense that it was bad for society. In the 3rd century, the Neoplatonist philosopher Porphyry wrote:

How can people not be in every way impious and atheistic who have apostatized from the customs of our ancestors through which every nation and city is sustained? ... What else are they than fighters against God?

Once distinguished from Judaism, Christianity was no longer seen as simply a bizarre sect of an old and venerable religion; it was a superstitio. Superstition had for the Romans a much more powerful and dangerous connotation than it does for much of the Western world today: to them, this term meant a set of religious practices that were not only different, but corrosive to society, "disturbing a man's mind in such a way that he is really going insane" and causing him to lose humanitas (humanity). The persecution of "superstitious" sects was hardly unheard-of in Roman history: an unnamed foreign cult was persecuted during a drought in 428 BC, some initiates of the Bacchic cult were executed when deemed out-of-hand in 186 BC, and measures were taken against the Celtic Druids during the early Principate.

Even so, the level of persecution experienced by any given community of Christians still depended upon how threatening the local official deemed this new superstitio to be. Christians' beliefs would not have endeared them to many government officials: they worshipped a convicted criminal, refused to swear by the emperor's genius, harshly criticized Rome in their holy books, and suspiciously conducted their rites in private. In the early third century one magistrate told Christians "I cannot bring myself so much as to listen to people who speak ill of the Roman way of religion."

=== Incest libel ===
Roman authors circulated a variety of slanders about early Christian gatherings, including the charge that Christians participated in an incestuous orgy after extinguishing the lights. These accusations arose partly from misunderstanding Christian use of familial terms such as "brother" and "sister", and from suspicion of their secret meeting practices. Tertullian, writing in the late 2nd century, directly refuted the allegation that Christians "put out the lights and indulge in shameless lust" during their assemblies. Modern scholarship notes that such "lamp-extinguishing" orgy accusations were part of a broader polemical tradition used by pagan critics against minority religious groups, including Christians.

== Persecution by reign ==
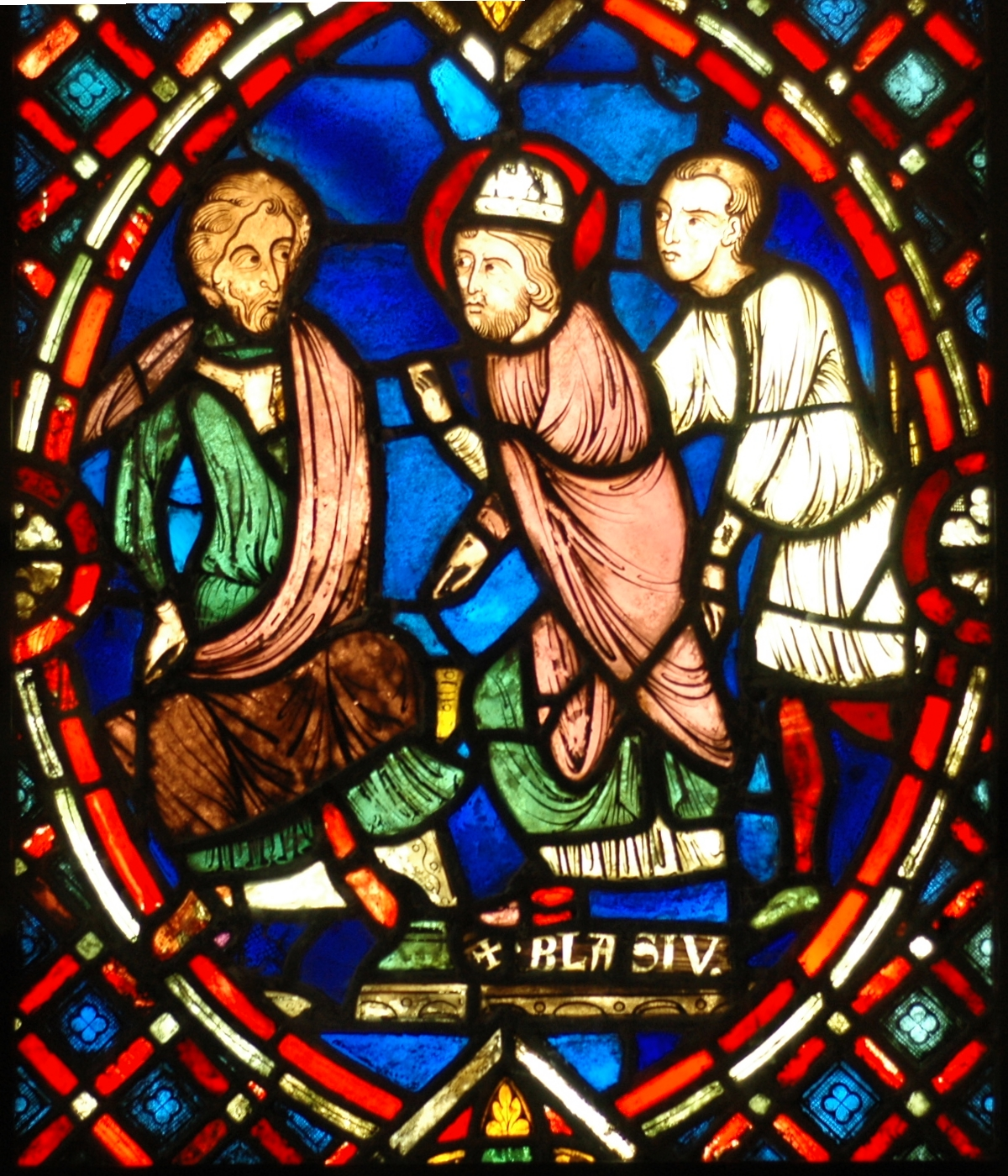
Saint Blaise on trial before the Roman governor, Louvre

=== Overview ===
Persecution of the early church occurred sporadically and in localized areas from the start. The first persecution of Christians organized by the Roman government was under the emperor Nero in AD 64 after the Great Fire of Rome and took place entirely within the city of Rome. The Edict of Serdica, issued in 311 by the Roman emperor Galerius, officially ended the Diocletianic persecution of Christianity in the East. With the publication in AD 313 of the Edict of Milan, persecution of Christians by the Roman state ceased. The total number of Christians who lost their lives because of these persecutions is unknown. The early church historian Eusebius, whose works are the only source for many of these events, speaks of "countless numbers" or "myriads" having perished. Walter Bauer criticized Eusebius for this, but Robert Grant says readers were used to this kind of exaggeration as it was common in Josephus and other historians of the time.

By the mid-2nd century, mobs were willing to throw stones at Christians, perhaps motivated by rival sects. The Persecution in Lyon (AD 177) was preceded by mob violence, including assaults, robberies and stonings. Lucian tells of an elaborate and successful hoax perpetrated by a "prophet" of Asclepius, using a tame snake, in Pontus and Paphlagonia. When rumor seemed about to expose his fraud, the witty essayist reports in his scathing essay

... he issued a promulgation designed to scare them, saying that Pontus was full of atheists and Christians who had the hardihood to utter the vilest abuse of him; these he bade them drive away with stones if they wanted to have the god gracious.

Tertullian's Apologeticus of 197 was ostensibly written in defense of persecuted Christians and addressed to Roman governors.

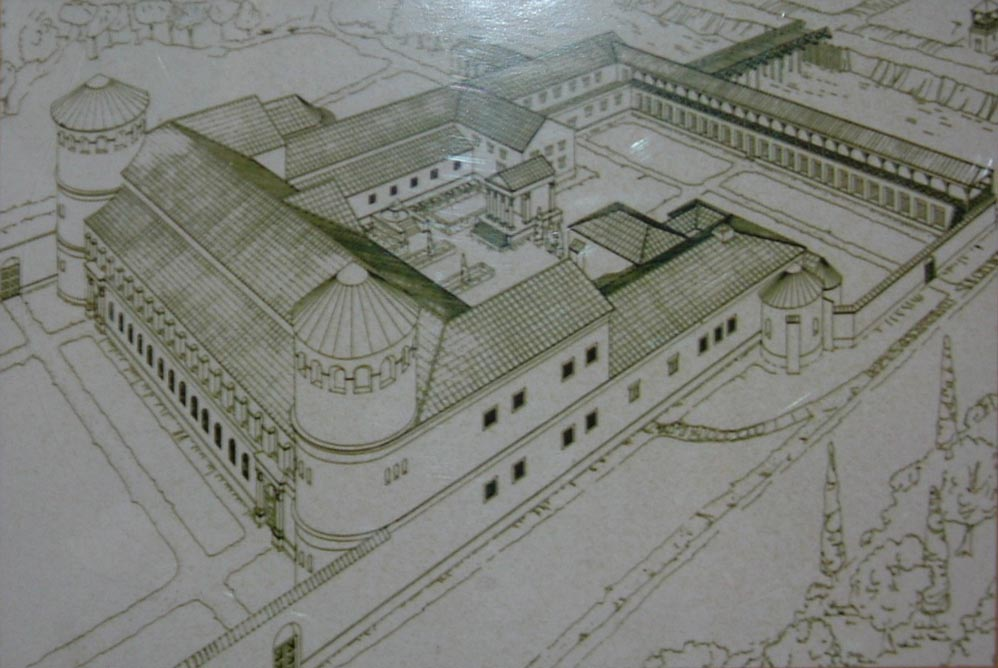
A reconstruction of the Roman governor's palace in Aquincum, Hungary

In AD 250, the emperor Decius issued a decree requiring public sacrifice, a formality equivalent to a testimonial of allegiance to the emperor and the established order. There is no evidence that the decree was intended to target Christians but was intended as a form of loyalty oath. Decius authorized roving commissions visiting the cities and villages to supervise the execution of the sacrifices and to deliver written certificates to all citizens who performed them. Christians were often given opportunities to avoid further punishment by publicly offering sacrifices or burning incense to Roman gods, and were accused by the Romans of impiety when they refused. Refusal was punished by arrest, imprisonment, torture, and executions. Christians fled to safe havens in the countryside and some purchased their certificates, called libelli. Several councils held at Carthage debated the extent to which the community should accept these lapsed Christians.

The persecutions culminated with Diocletian and Galerius at the end of the third and beginning of the 4th century. Their anti-Christian actions, considered the largest, were to be the last major Roman pagan action. The Edict of Serdica, also called Edict of Toleration by Galerius, was issued in 311 in Serdica (today Sofia, Bulgaria) by the Roman emperor Galerius, officially ending the Diocletianic persecution of Christianity in the East. Constantine the Great soon came into power and in 313 completely legalized Christianity. It was not until Theodosius I in the latter 4th century, however, that Christianity would become the official religion of the Roman Empire.

=== Persecution from AD 49 to 250 ===
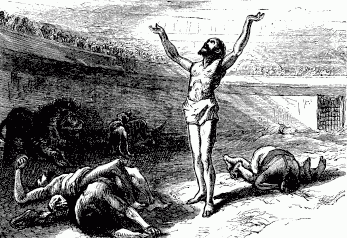
"Persecution of the Christians", Young Folks' History of Rome (1878).

In the New Testament (Acts 18:2-3), a Jew named Aquila is introduced who, with his wife Priscilla, had recently come from Italy because emperor Claudius "had ordered the Jews to leave Rome". Ed Richardson explains that expulsion occurred because disagreements in the Roman synagogues led to violence in the streets, and Claudius banished those responsible, but this also fell in the time period between 47 and 52 when Claudius engaged in a campaign to restore Roman rites and repress foreign cults. Suetonius records that Claudius expelled "the Jews" in 49, but Richardson says it was "mainly Christian missionaries and converts who were expelled", i.e. those Jewish Christians labelled under the name Chrestus. (Note: According to Richardson, "The confusion between chrestus and christus was natural enough. At that point in time, the distinction in spelling and pronunciation was negligible. In the manuscript tradition of the New Testament, the confusion is reflected in the spelling of the name "Christian" in Acts 11:26 and 26:28; and 1 Peter 4:16 where the uncial codex Sinaiticus reads...chrestianos...it was quite popular among those who were not Christians to exchange the two forms. The urge to identify the founder of the new "superstition" with a common slave name may have been too difficult to resist. Several of the early apologists [i.e. Justin, Tertullian, Lactantius] complain that pagans often confuse the two spellings, much to the dismay of the Christians".) "The garbled Chrestus is almost certainly evidence for the presence of Christians within the Jewish community of Rome".

Richardson points out that the term Christian "only became tangible in documents after the year 70" and that before that time, "believers in Christ were reckoned ethnically and religiously as belonging totally to the Jews". Suetonius and Tacitus used the terms "superstitio" and "impious [profani] rites" in describing the reasons for these events, terms not applied to Jews, but commonly applied to believers in Christ. The Roman empire protected the Jews through multiple policies guaranteeing the "unimpeded observance of Jewish cult practices". Richardson strongly asserts that believers in Christ were the 'Jews' that Claudius was trying to be rid of by expulsion.

It is generally agreed that from Nero's reign until Decius's widespread measures in 250, Christian persecution was isolated and localized. Although it is often claimed that Christians were persecuted for their refusal to worship the emperor, general dislike for Christians likely arose from their refusal to worship the gods of Rome which many of the emperors claimed to be or take part in sacrifice, which was expected of those living in the Roman Empire. Although the Jews also refused to partake in these actions, they were tolerated because they followed their own Jewish ceremonial law, and their religion was legitimized by its ancestral nature. On the other hand, Romans believed Christians, who were thought to take part in strange rituals and nocturnal rites, cultivated a dangerous and superstitious sect.

During this period, anti-Christian activities were accusatory and not inquisitive. Governors played a larger role in the actions than did Emperors, but Christians were not sought out by governors, and instead were accused and prosecuted through a process termed cognitio extra ordinem. Evidence shows that trials and punishments varied greatly, and sentences ranged from acquittal to death.

==== Neronian persecution ====
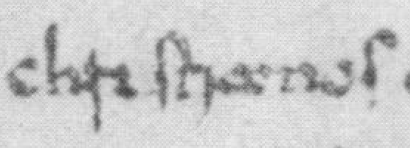
chrestianos, first mention of Christians in Tacitus' Annals as being persecuted by Nero. From 11th century copy.

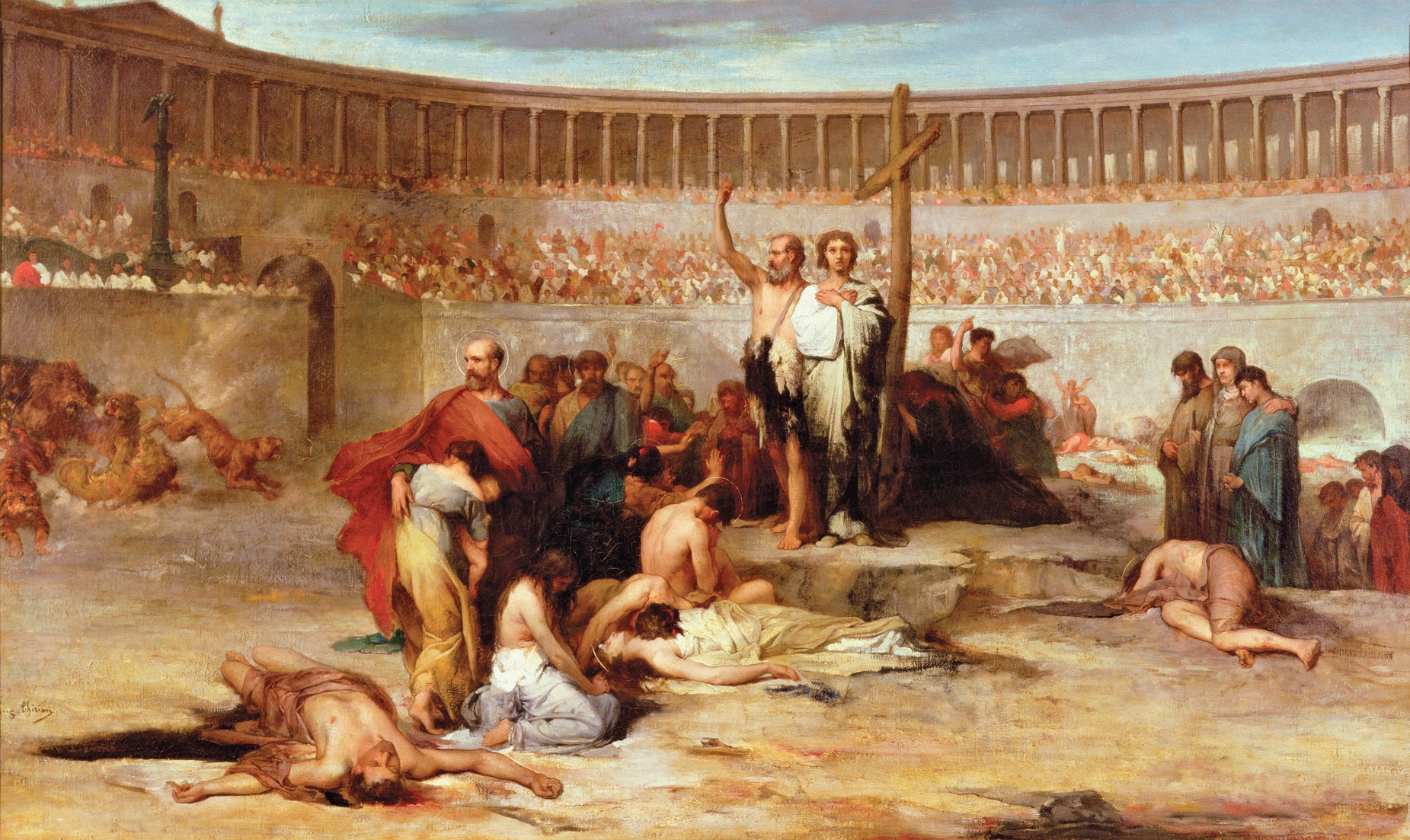
Triumph of Faith by Eugene Thirion (19th century) depicts Christian martyrs in the time of Nero

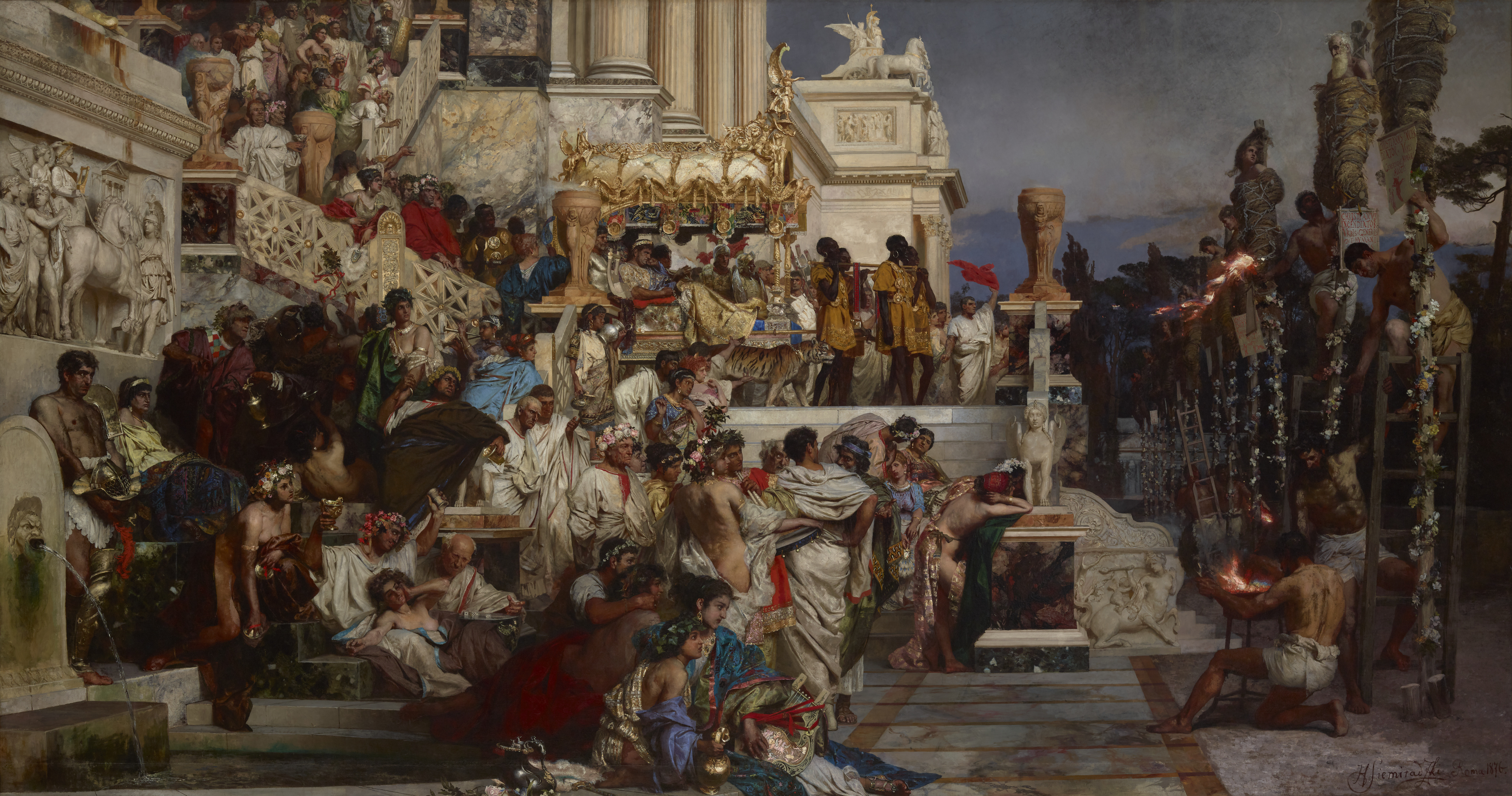
Nero's Torches, by Henryk Siemiradzki (1876). According to Tacitus, Nero used Christians as human torches

According to Tacitus and later Christian tradition, Nero blamed Christians for the Great Fire of Rome in 64, which destroyed portions of the city and economically devastated the Roman population. Anthony A. Barrett has written that "major archaeological endeavors have recently produced new evidence for the fire" but cannot show who started it. In the Annals of Tacitus, it reads:

...To get rid of the report, Nero fastened the guilt and inflicted the most exquisite tortures on a class hated for their abominations, called Chrestians by the populace. Christus, from whom the name had its origin, suffered the extreme penalty during the reign of Tiberius at the hands of one of our procurators, Pontius Pilatus, and a most mischievous superstition, thus checked for the moment, again broke out not only in Judæa, the first source of the evil, but even in Rome, where all things hideous and shameful from every part of the world find their centre and become popular.

— Tacitus' Annals 15.44, see Tacitus on Christ

This passage in Tacitus constitutes the only independent attestation that Nero blamed Christians for the Great Fire of Rome, and is generally believed to be authentic. Roughly contemporary with Tacitus, Suetonius in the 16th chapter of his biography of Nero wrote that "Punishment was inflicted on the Christians, a class of men given to a new and mischievous superstition", but does not specify the cause of the punishment. It is widely agreed on that the Number of the beast in the Book of Revelation, adding up to 666, is derived from a gematria of the name of Nero Caesar, indicating that Nero was viewed as an exceptionally evil figure in the recent Christian past.

Historians Candida Moss and Brent Shaw dispute the accuracy of these accounts, but their views are largely rejected by the majority of scholars. The historicity of the Neronian persecution is upheld by the vast majority of historians.

Scholars debate whether Nero condemned Christians solely for the charge of organized arson, or for other general crimes associated with Christianity. Because Tertullian mentions an institutum Neronianum in his apology "To the Nations", scholars debate the possibility of the creation of a law or decree against the Christians under Nero. French and Belgian scholars, and Marxists, have historically supported this view asserting that such a law would have been the application of common law rather than a formal decree. However, this view has been argued against that in context, the institutum Neronianum merely describes the anti-Christian activities; it does not provide a legal basis for them. Furthermore, no other writers besides Tertullian show knowledge of a law against Christians.

Several Christian sources report that Paul the Apostle and Saint Peter both died during the Neronian persecution; Origen and Dionysius of Corinth, quoted by Eusebius, further specify that Peter was crucified and that Paul was beheaded and that the two died in the same period. John 21:18 has been also adduced as further evidence that Peter was executed by crucifixion. The Epistle of Clement to the Corinthians states (AD 95) that Peter, Paul and other Christians were martyred; while it does not specify where and when this happened, the references to the "women [who] were persecuted as Danaids and Dirce" (1 Clement 6.2) refer to a kind of punishment characteristic of Nero's reign where the condemned women had to wear costumes of the two characters as a reenactment of their myths in the amphitheater or arena.

==== Domitian ====
According to some historians, Jews and Christians were heavily persecuted toward the end of Domitian's reign (89–96). The Book of Revelation, which mentions at least one instance of martyrdom (Rev 2:13; cf. 6:9), is thought by many scholars to have been written during Domitian's reign by attributing him to the eighth king in Rev 17:10–11. According to R. H. Charles, Revelation reflects a Nero redivivus myth (Nero coming back to life). Early church historian Eusebius wrote that the social conflict described by Revelation reflects Domitian's organization of excessive and cruel banishments and executions of Christians, but these claims may be exaggerated or false. A nondescript mention of Domitian's tyranny can be found in Chapter 3 of Lactantius' On the Manner in Which the Persecutors Died.

According to Barnes, "Melito, Tertullian, and Bruttius stated that Domitian persecuted the Christians. Melito and Bruttius vouchsafe no details, Tertullian only that Domitian soon changed his mind and recalled those whom he had exiled". A minority of historians have maintained that there was little or no anti-Christian activity during Domitian's time. The lack of consensus by historians about the extent of persecution during the reign of Domitian derives from the fact that while accounts of persecution exist, these accounts are cursory or their reliability is debated.

Often, reference is made to the execution of Titus Flavius Clemens, a Roman consul and cousin of the Emperor, and the banishment of his wife, Flavia Domitilla, to the island of Pandateria. Eusebius wrote that Flavia Domitilla was banished because she was a Christian. In Cassius Dio's account (67.14.1–2), he only reports that she, along with many others, was guilty of atheism and sympathy for Judaism. Suetonius does not mention the exile at all. According to Keresztes, it is more probable that they were converts to Judaism who attempted to evade payment of the Fiscus Judaicus—the tax imposed on all persons who practiced Judaism. Alan Brent notes that Pliny the Younger reported that Christians had been pressured to apostate during Domitian's reign. In any case, no stories of anti-Christian activities during Domitian's reign reference any sort of legal ordinances.

==== Trajan ====
Emperor Trajan corresponded with Pliny the Younger on the subject of how to deal with the Christians of Pontus. The theologian Edward Burton wrote that this correspondence shows there were no laws condemning Christians at that time. There was an "abundance of precedent (common law) for suppressing foreign superstitions" but no general law which prescribed "the form of trial or the punishment; nor had there been any special enactment which made Christianity a crime". Even so, Pliny implies that putting Christians on trial was not rare, and while Christians in his district had committed no illegal acts like robbery or adultery, Pliny "put persons to death, though they were guilty of no crime, and without the authority of any law" and believed his emperor would accept his actions. Trajan did, and sent back a qualified approval. He told Pliny to continue to prosecute Christians, but not to accept anonymous denunciations in the interests of justice as well as of "the spirit of the age". Non-citizens who admitted to being Christians and refused to recant, however, were to be executed "for obstinacy". Citizens were sent to Rome for trial.

Barnes says this placed Christianity "in a totally different category from all other crimes. What is illegal is being a Christian". This became an official edict which Burton calls the 'first rescript' against Christianity, and which Sherwin-White says "might have had the ultimate effect of a general law". Despite this, medieval Christian theologians considered Trajan to be a virtuous pagan.

==== Hadrian ====
Emperor Hadrian (r. 117–138), in responding to a request for advice from a provincial governor about how to deal with Christians, granted Christians more leniency. Hadrian stated that merely being a Christian was not enough for action against them to be taken, they must also have committed some illegal act. In addition, "slanderous attacks" against Christians were not to be tolerated. This implied that anyone who brought an action against Christians but whose action failed, would themselves face punishment.

==== Marcus Aurelius to Maximinus the Thracian ====
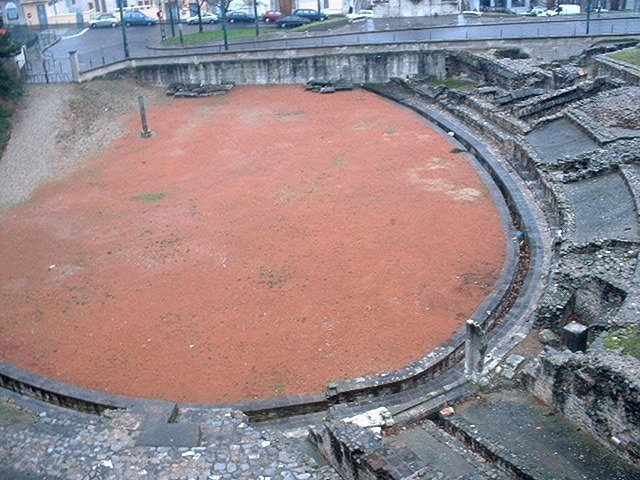
Amphithéâtre des Trois-Gaules, in Lyon. The pole in the arena is a memorial to the people killed during this persecution.

Sporadic bouts of anti-Christian activity occurred during the period from the reign of Marcus Aurelius to that of Maximinus. Governors continued to play a more important role than emperors in persecutions during this period.

In the first half of the third century, the relation of Imperial policy and ground-level actions against Christians remained much the same:

It was pressure from below, rather than imperial initiative, that gave rise to troubles, breaching the generally prevailing but nevertheless fragile, limits of Roman tolerance: the official attitude was passive until activated to confront particular cases and this activation normally was confined to the local and provincial level.

Apostasy in the form of symbolic sacrifice continued to be enough to set a Christian free. It was standard practice to imprison a Christian after an initial trial, with pressure and an opportunity to recant.

The number and severity of persecutions in various locations of the empire seemingly increased during the reign of Marcus Aurelius,161-180. The martyrs of Madaura and the Scillitan Martyrs were executed during his tenure. The extent to which Marcus Aurelius himself directed, encouraged, or was aware of these persecutions is unclear and much debated by historians.

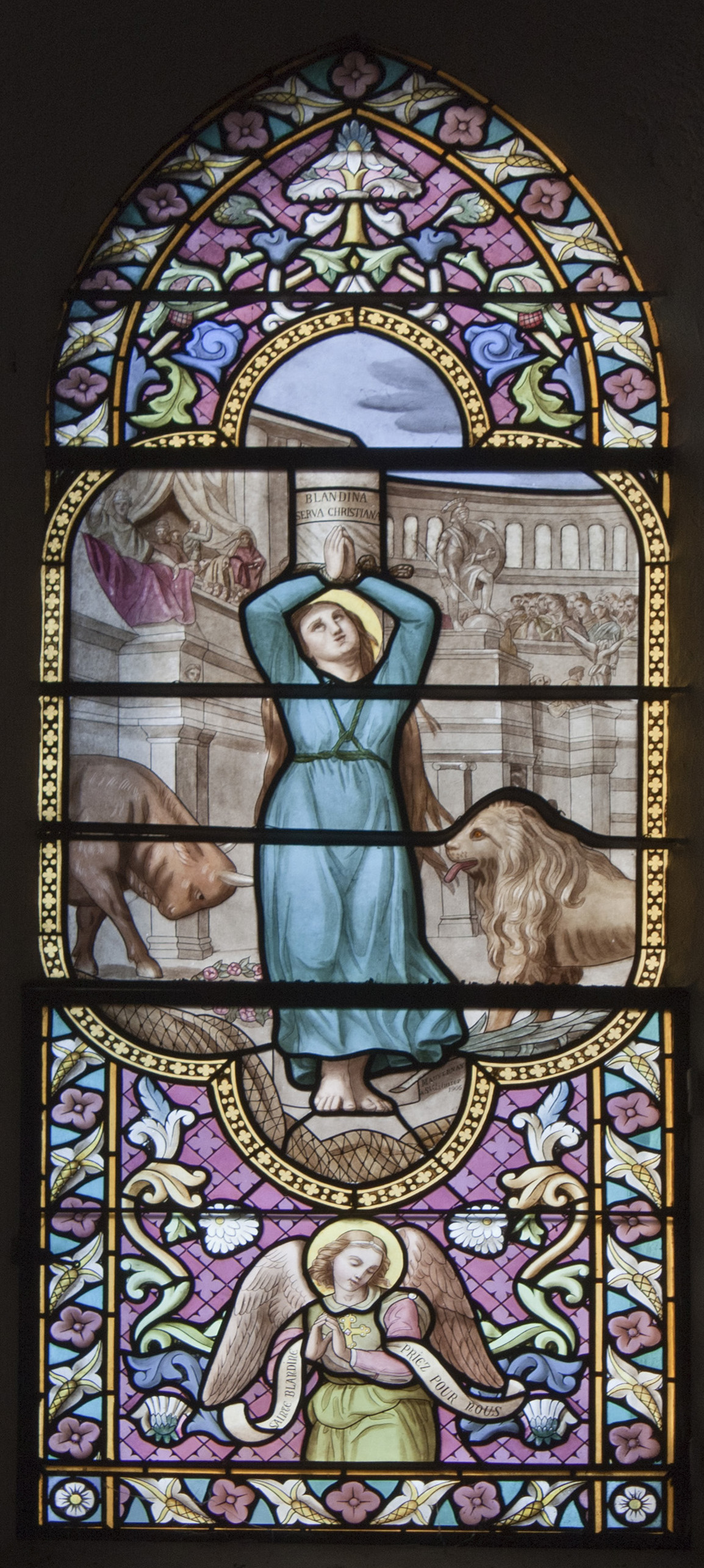
The Martyrdom of Saint Blandina, one of the martyrs of Lyon

One of the most notable instances of persecution during the reign of Aurelius occurred in 177 at Lugdunum (present-day Lyon, France), where the Sanctuary of the Three Gauls had been established by Augustus in the late 1st century BC. The persecution in Lyon started as an unofficial movement to ostracize Christians from public spaces such as the market and the baths, but eventually resulted in official action. Christians were arrested, tried in the forum, and subsequently imprisoned. They were condemned to various punishments: being fed to the beasts, torture, and the poor living conditions of imprisonment. Slaves belonging to Christians testified that their masters participated in incest and cannibalism. Barnes cites this persecution as the "one example of suspected Christians being punished even after apostasy."

Eusebius says that in 177, Irenaeus had been sent with a letter, from certain members of the Church of Lyon awaiting martyrdom, to Pope Eleutherius; Ireneaus does not mention the persecution in his Adversus Haereses. Eusebius writes of it in his Ecclesiastical History, written about 120 years after the events. Gregory of Tours tells of it in his "Liber in gloria martyrum", or "Book of the Glories of the Martyrs". It deals almost exclusively with the miracles wrought in Gaul by the martyrs of the Roman persecutions.

A number of persecutions of Christians occurred in the Roman empire during the reign of Septimius Severus (193–211). Clement of Alexandria wrote during his reign that "we have exhibited before our eyes every day abundant sources of martyrs that are burnt, impaled, beheaded." The traditional view has been that Severus was responsible. This is based on a reference to a decree he is said to have issued forbidding conversions to Judaism and Christianity but this decree is known only from one source, the Historia Augusta, an unreliable mix of fact and fiction. Early church historian Eusebius describes Severus as a persecutor, but the Christian apologist Tertullian states that Severus was well disposed towards Christians, employed a Christian as his personal physician, and had personally intervened to save from "the mob" several high-born Christians whom he knew.

Some historians argue that Severus initially held a favorable policy towards Christians during his early years of reign, but later changed, and in his tenth year of reign he began to persecute them. Alternatively, Eusebius' description of Severus as a persecutor may derive merely from the fact that numerous persecutions occurred during his reign, including Perpetua and Felicity in the Roman province of Africa, but this was probably as the result of local persecutions rather than empire-wide actions or decrees by Severus.

Other instances of persecution occurred before the reign of Decius, but there are fewer accounts of them from 215 onward. This may reflect a decrease in hostility toward Christianity or gaps in the available sources. Perhaps the most famous of these post-Severan persecutions are those attributed to Maximinus the Thracian (r. 235–238). According to Eusebius, a persecution undertaken by Maximinus against heads of the church in 235 sent both Hippolytus and Pope Pontian into exile on Sardinia. Origen also referred to public executions of Christians taking place during Maximinus' reign. Other evidence suggests the persecution of 235 was local to provinces like Cappadocia and Pontus, and not set in motion by the emperor.

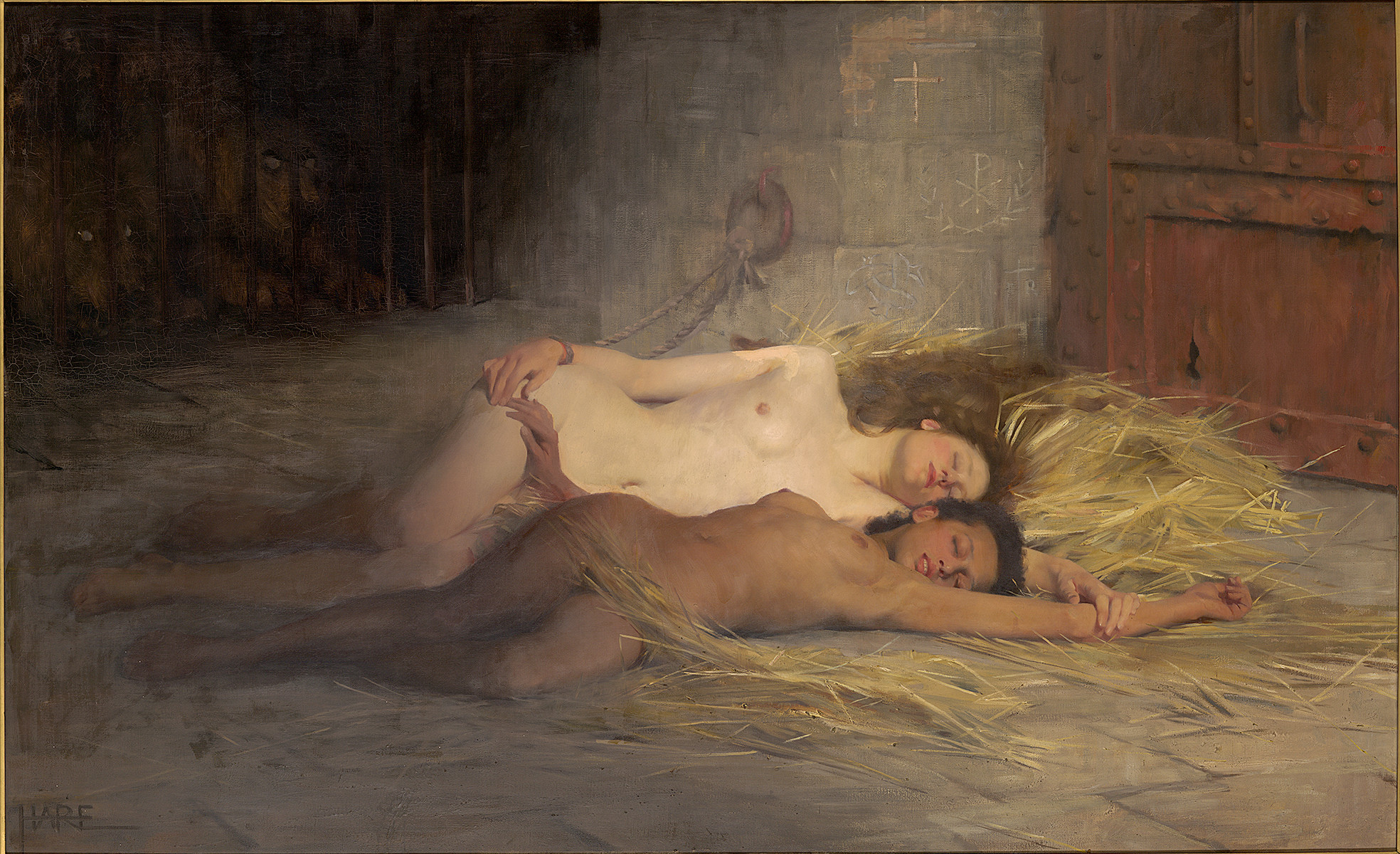
The Victory of Faith, by Saint George Hare, depicts two Christians in the eve of their damnatio ad bestias

Christians who refused to recant by performing ceremonies to honour the gods were severely penalised. Those who were Roman citizens were exiled or condemned to a swift death by beheading; slaves, foreign-born residents, and lower classes were liable to be put to death by wild beasts as a public spectacle. A variety of animals were used for those condemned to die in this way. Keith Hopkins says that it is disputed whether Christians were executed at the Colosseum at Rome, since no evidence of it has been found yet.

Norbert Brockman writes in the Encyclopedia of Sacred Places that public executions were held at the Colosseum during the period of empire, and that there is no real doubt that Christians were executed there. St. Ignatius was "sent to the beasts by Trajan in 107. Shortly after, 115 Christians were killed by archers. When the Christians refused to pray to the gods for the end of a plague in the latter part of the second century, Marcus Aurelius had thousands killed in the colosseum for blasphemy".

=== Decius ===
The first empire-wide, officially sanctioned, persecution of Christians took place during the reign of the emperor Decius in the third century. Provincial governors had a great deal of personal discretion in their jurisdictions and could choose themselves how to deal with local incidents of persecution and mob violence against Christians.

In AD 250, an empire-wide persecution took place as an indirect consequence of an edict by Decius. This edict was in force for eighteen months, during which time some Christians were killed while others apostatised to escape execution. Anglican historian W. H. C. Frend estimates that 3,000–3,500 Christians were killed in the persecution.

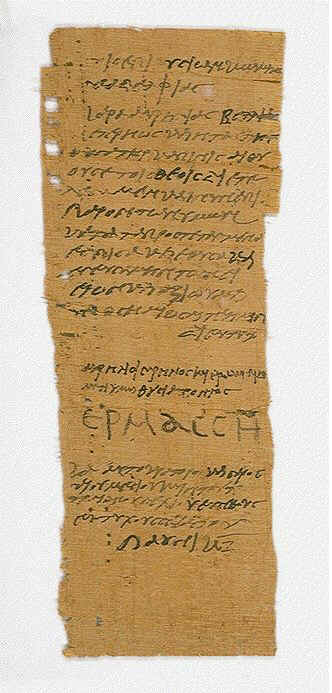
A libellus from the Decian persecution 250 AD

In 250, Decius issued an edict, the text of which has been lost, requiring everyone in the Empire (except Jews, who were exempted) to perform a sacrifice to the gods in the presence of a Roman magistrate and obtain a signed and witnessed certificate, called a libellus, to this effect. The decree was part of Decius' drive to restore traditional Roman values and there is no evidence that Christians were specifically being targeted. A number of these certificates still exist and one discovered in Egypt (text of papyrus in illustration) reads:

To those in charge of the sacrifices of the village Theadelphia, from Aurelia Bellias, daughter of Peteres, and her daughter Kapinis. We have always been constant in sacrificing to the gods, and now too, in your presence, in accordance with the regulations, I have poured libations and sacrificed and tasted the offerings, and I ask you to certify this for us below. May you continue to prosper. (Second person's handwriting) We, Aurelius Serenus and Aurelius Hermas, saw you sacrificing. (Third person's handwriting) I, Hermas, certify. The first year of the Emperor Caesar Gaius Messias Quintus Traianus Decius Pius Felix Augustus, Pauni 27.

When the provincial governor Pliny had written to the emperor Trajan in 112, he said he required suspected Christians to curse Christ, but there is no mention of Christ or Christians in the certificates from Decius' reign. Nevertheless, this was the first time that Christians throughout the Empire had been forced by imperial edict to choose between their religion and their lives and a number of prominent Christians, including Pope Fabian, Babylas of Antioch, and Alexander of Jerusalem died as a result of their refusal to perform the sacrifices.

The number of Christians who were executed as a result of their refusal to obtain a certificate is not known, nor how much of an effort was made by the authorities to check who had received a certificate and who had not, but it is known that large numbers of Christians apostatized and performed the ceremonies while others, including Cyprian, bishop of Carthage, went into hiding. Although the period of enforcement of the edict was only about eighteen months, it was severely traumatic to many Christian communities which had until then lived undisturbed, and left bitter memories of monstrous tyranny.

In most churches, those who had lapsed were accepted into communion. Some African dioceses, however, refused to re-admit them. The Decian persecution led directly to Novatianism, a schismatic movement whose proponents wanted to maintain excommunication of those lapsed Christians who had not maintained their confession of faith under persecution. (A little more than 50 years later, the Diocletianic persecution would prompt a similar response in the Donatist schism.)

=== Valerian ===
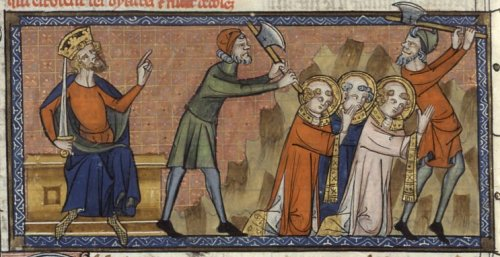
The martyrdom of Sixtus II under Emperor Valerian, 14th century.

The emperor Valerian took the throne in 253. From 254 he was away from Rome fighting the Persians who had conquered Antioch. He never returned, as he was taken captive in 260 and died a prisoner. He sent two letters regarding Christians to the Senate. In the first, in the year 257, he ordered all Christian clergy to perform sacrifices to the Roman gods and forbade Christians from holding meetings in cemeteries.

A second letter in 258 ordered that bishops and other high-ranking church officials were to be put to death, and that senators and equites who were Christians were to be stripped of their titles and lose their property. If they would not perform sacrifices to the gods they also were to be executed. Roman matrons who would not apostatize were to lose their property and be banished, while civil servants and members of the Emperor's staff and household who refused to sacrifice would be reduced to slavery and sent to work on the Imperial estates. The fact that there were such high ranking Christians at the very heart of the Roman imperial establishment shows that the actions taken by Decius less than a decade before had not had a lasting effect.

Among those executed under Valerian were Cyprian, Bishop of Carthage, and Sixtus II, Bishop of Rome with his deacons, including Saint Lawrence. The public examination of Cyprian by the proconsul in Carthage, Galerius Maximus, on 14 September 258 has been preserved:

Galerius Maximus: "Are you Thascius Cyprianus?"
Cyprian: "I am."
Galerius: "The most sacred Emperors have commanded you to conform to the Roman rites."
Cyprian: "I refuse."
Galerius: "Take heed for yourself."
Cyprian: "Do as you are bid; in so clear a case I may not take heed."
Galerius, after briefly conferring with his judicial council, with much reluctance pronounced the following sentence: "You have long lived an irreligious life, and have drawn together a number of men bound by an unlawful association, and professed yourself an open enemy to the gods and the religion of Rome; and the pious, most sacred and august Emperors ... have endeavoured in vain to bring you back to conformity with their religious observances; whereas therefore you have been apprehended as principal and ringleader in these infamous crimes, you shall be made an example to those whom you have wickedly associated with you; the authority of law shall be ratified in your blood." He then read the sentence of the court from a written tablet: "It is the sentence of this court that Thascius Cyprianus be executed with the sword."
Cyprian: "Thanks be to God."

Taken directly to the place of execution, Cyprian was decapitated. The words of the sentence show that in the eyes of the Roman state, Christianity was not a religion at all, and the church was a criminal organization. When Valerian's son Gallienus became Emperor in 260, the legislation was revoked and the persecution ended. The period of relative toleration between the accession of Gallienus to the next mass persecution is known as the Little Peace of the Church.

A warrant to arrest a Christian, dated 28 February 256, was found among the Oxyrhynchus Papyri (P. Oxy 3035). The grounds for the arrest are not given in the document. Valerian's first act as emperor on 22 October 253 was to make his son Gallienus his Caesar and colleague. Early in his reign, affairs in Europe went from bad to worse, and the whole West fell into disorder. In the East, Antioch had fallen into the hands of a Sassanid vassal and Armenia was occupied by the Persian King of Kings, Shapur I (Sapor). Valerian and Gallienus split the problems of the empire between them, with the son taking the West, and the father heading East to face the Persian threat.

=== Diocletian and Galerius ===
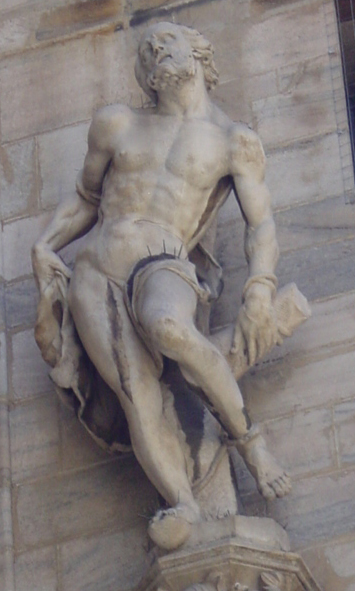
Statue of a martyr, Milan Cathedral

Diocletian's accession in 284 did not mark an immediate reversal of disregard to Christianity, but it did herald a gradual shift in official attitudes toward religious minorities. In the first fifteen years of his rule, Diocletian purged the army of Christians, condemned Manicheans to death, and surrounded himself with public opponents of Christianity. Diocletian's preference for autocratic government, combined with his self-image as a restorer of past Roman glory, presaged the most pervasive persecution in Roman history.

In the winter of 302, Galerius urged Diocletian to begin a general persecution of the Christians. Diocletian was wary, and asked the oracle of Apollo for guidance. The oracle's reply was read as an endorsement of Galerius's position, and a general persecution was called on 24 February 303. According to recent research, "At least nine imperial orders were issued in 303 to 312 against Christianity. While Diocletian's orders were more concerned with the privileged upper classes of Christians, Maximinus Daia's orders were aimed at isolating all Christians from the Roman community".

Support for persecution within the Roman ruling class was not universal. Where Galerius and Diocletian were avid persecutors, Constantius was unenthusiastic. Later persecutory edicts, including the calls for all inhabitants to sacrifice to the Roman gods, were not applied in his domain. His son, Constantine, on taking the imperial office in 306, restored Christians to full legal equality and returned property that had been confiscated during the persecution. In Italy in 306, the usurper Maxentius ousted Maximian's successor Severus, promising full religious toleration. Galerius ended the persecution in the East in 311, but it was resumed in Egypt, Palestine, and Asia Minor by his successor, Maximinus. Constantine and Licinius, Severus's successor, signed the "Edict of Milan" in 313, which offered a more comprehensive acceptance of Christianity than Galerius's edict had provided. Licinius ousted Maximinus in 313, bringing an end to persecution in the East.

The persecution failed to check the rise of the church. By 324, Constantine was sole ruler of the empire, and Christianity had become his favored religion. Although the persecution resulted in death, torture, imprisonment, or dislocation for many Christians, the majority of the empire's Christians avoided punishment. The persecution did, however, cause many churches to split between those who had complied with imperial authority (the lapsi) and those who had held firm. Certain schisms, like those of the Donatists in North Africa and the Melitians in Egypt, persisted long after the persecutions. Peter Brown writes that

The failure of the Great Persecution of Diocletian was regarded as a confirmation of a long process of religious self-assertion against the conformism of a pagan empire. Freedom to assert a belief not recognized by the State was won and held. 'However much Christian churches and states may have sinned in later times by their religious coercion, the martyrdoms of the Roman Persecutions belong to the history of freedom'. And in this revolution... the issues at stake were not merely the local grievances of a province; they were nothing less than the place of religion in society.

== Controversies ==
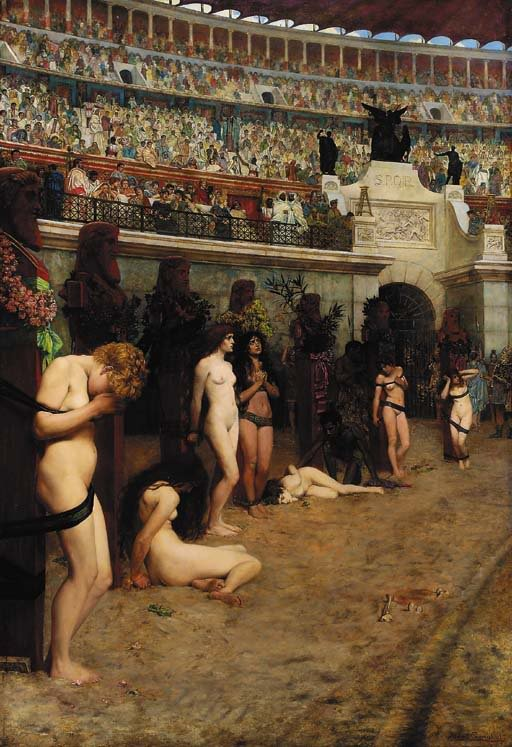
"Faithful Unto Death" by Herbert Schmalz

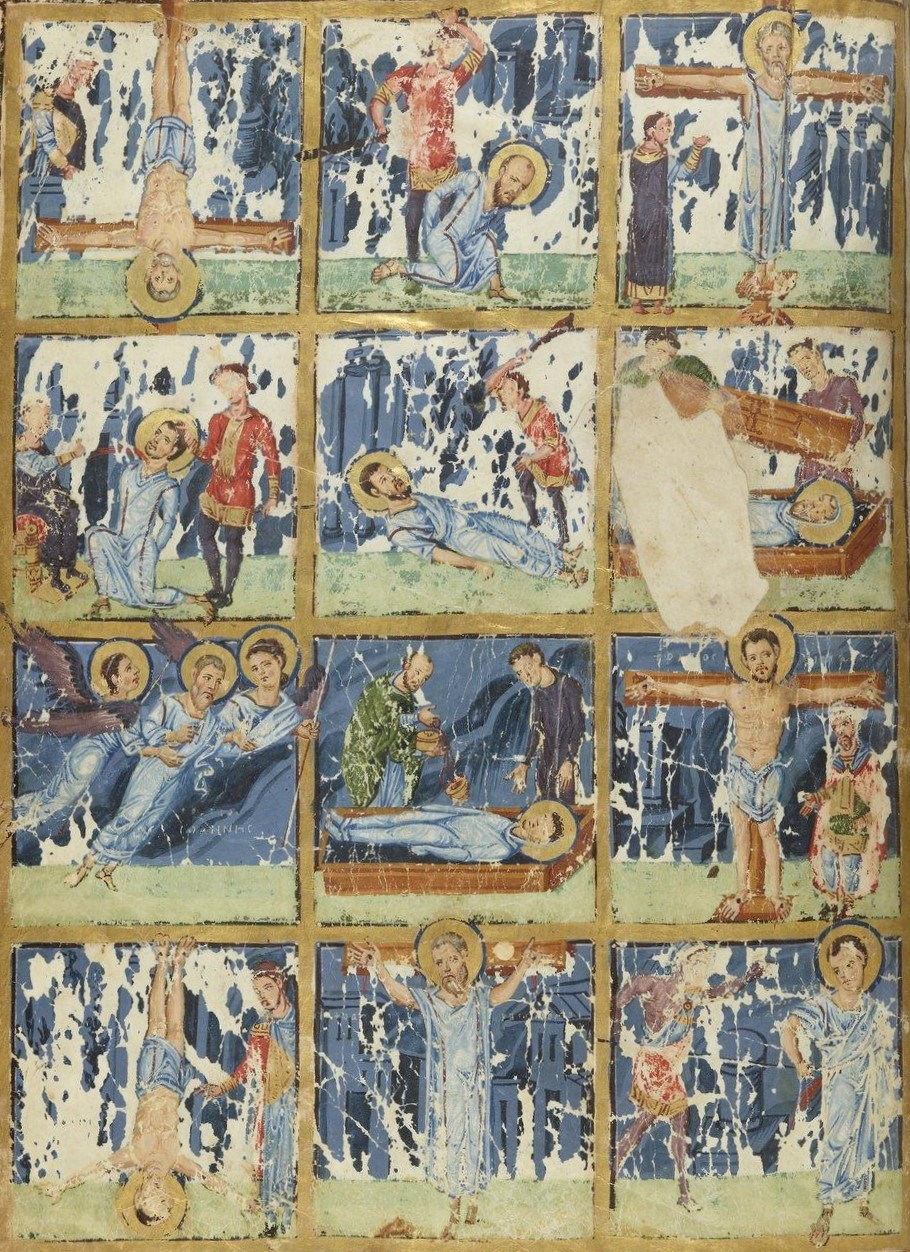
Martyrdoms of the 12 Apostles depicted in the Paris Gregory (9th century)

Theologian Paul Middleton writes that:

... accounts of martyrdom are contested narratives. There is no neutral way in which to tell martyr stories, as they inevitably create heroes and villains... even in the early church, martyrdom has always been contested. Moreover, any quest to distinguish objectively between true and false martyrdom essentially represents the imposition of the values or identity claims of the compiler, narrator or even editor.

There is no shortage of disagreement and controversy when it comes to Christian martyrdom in Roman Empire.

=== Gibbon ===
This "long standing debate" can be seen as having begun with historians such as Gibbon and Bowersock. According to historian Patricia Craddock, Gibbon's History is a masterpiece that fails only where his biases affect his method allowing the "desertion of the role of historian for that of prosecuting attorney". Accordingly, Gibbon has, himself, become an aspect of the long-standing debate.

Gibbon claimed the Christian martyr accounts exaggerated the numbers and barbarity of the persecutions. Subsequent scholars have built on this, asserting exaggeration was necessary to create the "cult of the martyrs" out of the need for a Christian identity separate from the Jewish and Roman identities. Exaggeration and falsification did occur, though mostly in the Middle Ages, and the martyrs did have a powerful impact on early Christian identity, but Dean and theology professor Graydon F. Snyder of Bethany and Chicago Seminaries, uses ancient texts and archeological evidence, (defined as "all evidence of a non-literary nature: ...extant buildings, built–forms, symbols, art, funerary practices, inscriptions, letters, records and even music"), to assert the cult of martyrs did not influence early records because it did not begin until after Constantine.

The majority of modern writers are less skeptical than Gibbon of the severity of the Great persecution. As the Diocletian historian, Stephen Williams, wrote in 1985,

even allowing a margin for invention, what remains is terrible enough. Unlike Gibbon, we live in an age which has experienced similar things, and knows how unsound is that civilized smile of incredulity at such reports. Things can be, have been, every bit as bad as our worst imaginings.

=== Authenticity ===
The number of authentic Christian accounts, histories, and other pre-Constantinian evidences of martyrdom is heavily debated. The Acts of the Martyrs, (in Latin, Acta Martyrum), include all the varied accounts (acta, gesta, passiones, martyria, and legenda) of the arrests, interrogations, condemnations, executions, and burials of the martyrs of the early centuries. These accounts vary in historicity as many were written long after the events they describe. The classification criterion by Hippolyte Delehaye, allows the texts to be classified into three groups:

1. The official records and the accounts of direct testimonies.
2. Narratives based on documents belonging to the first group or, at least, on a certain number of safe historical elements.
3. The much later novels or hagiographic fantasies.

There is general acceptance of the first category as largely historical and the third category as non-historical fiction; debate centers on the second category. According to Píerre Maraval, many of these texts were written to spiritually "edify their readers, and their primary intention is not to make history, but to give the image of the perfect testimony". Maraval goes on to say the Acta and Passiones have preserved enough authentic historical data to allow the modern reader to realize the reality of the persecutions and the ways their communities felt them.

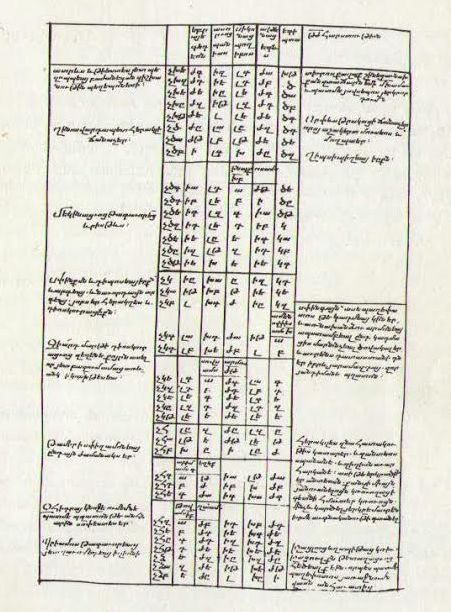
An Armenian translation of Chronicon. 13th century manuscript

Eusebius' authenticity has also been an aspect of this long debate. Eusebius is biased, and Barnes says Eusebius makes mistakes, particularly of chronology, (and through excess devotion to Constantine), but many of his claims are accepted as dependable due largely to his method which includes carefully quoted comprehensive excerpts from original sources that are now lost. For example, Eusebius claims that, "while Marcus was associated with [Pius] in the imperial power [138 to 161], Pius wrote [concerning the criminal nature of being Christian] to the cities of Larisa, Thessalonica, and Athens and to all the Greeks ... Eusebius cites Melito's Apology for corroboration, and the manuscript of Justin's Apologies presents the same alleged imperial letter, with only minor variations in the text.

The principle that Christians are eo ipso criminals is well attested in the years immediately after 161. It is assumed in the imperial letter concerning the Gallic Christians, is attacked by Melito in his Apology, and seems to have provided the charge upon which Justin and his companions were tried and executed between 161 and 168". According to Barnes, Eusebius is thus supported in much of what he says.

=== Voluntarism ===
G. E. M. de Ste. Croix divides early Christian martyrs into three categories: those who volunteered for martyrdom; those who did not volunteer but whose behavior, i.e. refusing to obey, attracted it; and those who were pursued by authorities without any overt act on their part. Out of the 91 Palestinian martyrs mentioned by Eusebius in his work Martyrs of Palestine, Ste. Croix says there are no details enabling categorization on 44 of them; of the remaining 47, 13 were volunteers, 18 "drew attention to themselves", and 16 "may have been sought out". Ste. Croix then combines the first two categories into a broad definition of "voluntary martyrdom" and excludes them from the total number of martyrs.

Herbert Musurillo, translator and scholar of The Acts of the Christian martyrs Introduction, says that St. Croix "overstresses the voluntariness of Christian martyrdom, for which there is only scant evidence in the early Acta. Professor of philosophy Alan Vincelette agreed, writing that Ste. Croix's categorization of voluntary martyrdom is too broad, that examination of the first four centuries shows it did exist, but that it made up only about 12% of martyrs in total instead of Ste. Croix's 75%.

G.W. Bowerstock suggests that voluntary martyrdom was sufficiently widespread that by the end of the second century, Church authorities tried to repress it, and by the third and fourth centuries, those authorities began to distinguish sharply as to who would receive the "crown of martyrdom" and who would not "between solicited [volunteered for] martyrdom and the more traditional kind that came as a result of persecution".

In her work, Candida Moss argued that voluntary martyrdom was not recognized as a distinct category by early Christians. "where there are no linguistic terms to serve as guides, scholars feel free to work with assumptions and highly individual taxonomies about what makes a martyrdom provoked or voluntary." She argues that evidence for voluntary martyrdom as a discrete practice can only be ascertained from texts that distinguish between types of martyrdom, and when this happens, these distinctions are never neutral. Moss argues that early Christians only began to recognize and condemn "voluntary martyrdom" from the third century onwards.

In a similar vein, Paul Middleton argues for the validity of voluntary martyrdom as a subset of "proto-orthodox Christian martyrdom" and including them all in the numerical total. He says that in the Acts of St. Cyprian, "there is nothing in the text that suggests that those who engaged in the mass act of voluntary martyrdom were anything other than true martyrs". In the Passion of Perpetua the Christian leader who comes to strengthen those already in prison is described as someone who "gave himself up of his own accord". When the proconsul of Asia, Arrius Antonius, responds to a group of Christians demanding to be martyred by ordering a few to death and telling the rest: "O miserable men, if you want to die, you have cliffs and nooses", Tertullian seems to uphold voluntary arrest by responding that he (Tertullian) and his fellow Christians have no fear of Roman reprisals but instead "invite their infliction". In Moss and Middleton's view, voluntarism can be seen as a radical form of martyrdom that was indeed criticized in later Christianity, but the volunteers were also "valorized as martyrs in early Christian tradition".

=== Numbers ===
Ste. Croix's estimate for the total number of martyred dead during the Great Persecution depends entirely upon his belief that Eusebius aimed at producing a full account of the martyrs from his province in his Martyrs of Palestine, but Eusebius' aims are disputed. Ste. Croix argued that Eusebius' aims were clear from the text of the Martyrs: after describing Caesarea's martyrdoms for 310, (the last to have taken place in the city), Eusebius writes, "Such were the martyrdoms which took place at Cæsarea during the entire period of the persecution"; after describing the later mass executions at Phaeno, Eusebius writes, "These martyrdoms were accomplished in Palestine during eight complete years; and this was a description of the persecution in our time."

Timothy Barnes asserts that Eusebius' intent was not as broad as Ste. Croix argues. In Barnes' view, it was not Eusebius' intent to give a comprehensive account of all martyrs, but to give examples that described what it was like. Barnes cites the preface to the long recension of the Martyrs in support which begins: "It is meet, then, that the conflicts which were illustrious in various districts should be committed to writing by those who dwelt with the combatants in their districts. But for me, I pray that I may be able to speak of those with whom I was personally conversant," indicating there are some he doesn't mention as they are mentioned elsewhere.

Jan Bremmer, professor emeritus of religious studies at the University of Groningen, Netherlands, writes that: "As we know that Eusebius had collected older martyr narratives in a book titled Collection of the Ancient Martyrs, there will have existed a number of martyr narratives not mentioned by Eusebius in his surviving texts". Bremmer argues that there is no reason to expect that either Eusebius or Augustine would have included every martyr they knew of in their texts. Eusebius' text also discloses unnamed companions of the martyrs and confessors who are not included in the tallies based on the Palestinian Martyrs. Bremmer and Aaltje Hidding have also pointed to other sources apart from Eusebius that contain additional references to martyrs and martyrdom stories.

Edward Gibbon, (after lamenting the vagueness of Eusebius' phrasing), made the first estimate of the number martyred in the Great persecution by counting the total number of persons listed in the Martyrs of Palestine, dividing it by the years covered, multiplying it by the fraction of the overall population of the Roman world represented by the province of Palestine, and multiplying that figure by the total period of the persecution; he arrived at a number of less than two thousand. This approach is dependent upon the assumption that number of martyrs in the Martyrs of Palestine is complete, an accurate understanding of the population, and its even distribution throughout the empire, which was not the case in actuality. In 1931, Goodenough disputed Gibbon's estimate as inaccurate; many others followed with great variance in their estimates, beginning with the number of Christians varying from less than 6 million upwards to 15 million in an empire of 60 million by the year 300; if only 1 percent of 6 million Christians died under Diocletian, that is sixty thousand people.

Other subsequent estimates have followed Gibbon's basic methodology. W. H. C. Frend estimated that 3,000–3,500 Christians were killed in the Great persecution, although this number is disputed. The historian Min Seok Shin estimates that over 23,500 Christians suffered martyrdom under Diocletian, of whom the names of 850 are known.

Ste. Croix cautions against concluding numbers convey impact: "Mere statistics of martyrdoms are not at all a reliable index of the sufferings of the Christians as a whole".

== See also ==
- Acts of the Martyrs
- Christian martyrs
- Damnatio ad bestias
- Hellenistic religion
- Interpretatio graeca
- Martyrdom of Polycarp
- New-martyr
- Scillitan Martyrs
- Persecution of pagans in the late Roman Empire

== Sources ==
- Barnes, T.D. (1968). "Legislation Against the Christians." Journal of Roman Studies. Vol. 58.
- Brent, Allen (1999). The Imperial Cult and the Development of Church Order: Concepts and Images of Authority in Paganism and Early Christianity Before the Age of Cyprian. BRILL. ISBN 978-90-04-11420-3.
- Hurtado, Larry W. (2005). "To Live and Die for Jesus: Social and Political Consequences of Devotion to Jesus in Earliest Christianity". How on Earth Did Jesus Become a God? Historical Questions about Earliest Devotion to Jesus. Grand Rapids, Michigan and Cambridge, UK: Wm. B. Eerdmans. pp. 56–82. ISBN 978-0-8028-2861-3.
- Kinzig, Wolfram (2021). Christian Persecution in Antiquity (PDF). Baylor University Press. ISBN 978-1-4813-1388-9.
- Middleton, Paul (2015). "Noble Death Or Death Cult? Pagan Criticism of Early Christian Martyrdom". In Labahn, Michael; Lehtipuu, Outi (eds.). People under Power: Early Jewish and Christian Responses to the Roman Empire. Early Christianity in the Roman World. Vol. 1. Amsterdam: Amsterdam University Press. pp. 205–228. doi:10.1515/9789048521999-009. ISBN 9789048521999.
- Moss, Candida (2013). The Myth of Persecution: How Early Christians Invented a Story of Martyrdom. HarperCollins. ISBN 978-0-06-210452-6.
- Frend, W.H.C. (1965). Martyrdom and Persecution in the Early Church: A Study of a Conflict from the Maccabees to Donatus. Cambridge: James Clarke & Co.
- Fox, Robin Lane (1986). Pagans and Christians. Viking. ISBN 0-670-80848-2.
- Bibliowicz, Abel M. (2025). Jewish-Christian Relations-The First Centuries. WA: Mascarat. ISBN 978-1513616483. Archived from the original on 2021-11-16.
- de Ste. Croix, G.E.M. (2006). "Why Were The Early Christians Persecuted?". A Journal of Historical Studies, 1963: 6–38. Page references in this article relate to a reprint of this essay in Whitby, Michael, ed. (2006). Christian Persecution, Martyrdom, And Orthodoxy. Oxford University Press. ISBN 0-19-927812-1.
