= Scillitan Martyrs =

African Christian victims of Roman persecutions (180 AD)

- Born: 2nd-century, near Scillium, Roman Africa Province
- Died: 17 July 180, Carthage, Africa Province; in modern Kasserine Governorate, Tunisia
- Martyred by: Publius Vigellius Saturninus, a proconsul of the Roman Empire under Marcus Aurelius (r. 161–180)
- Means of martyrdom: Beheading
- Venerated in: Catholic Church; Eastern Orthodox Church
- Canonized: Pre-congregation
- Feast: 17 July

The Scillitan Martyrs were a group of early Christians of North Africa executed by the Roman Empire in Carthage, modern Tunisia, on 17 July 180 AD. The group takes its name from the nearby town of Scillium. They are venerated as martyrs in the Catholic and Eastern Orthodox churches. Their executions occurred at the end of a wave of persecution of Christians in the Roman Empire during the reign of Marcus Aurelius in 161–180.

An early textual account of the executions was produced titled the Acts of the Scillitan Martyrs. According to scholar Herbert Musurillo, this text is "the earliest dated document from the Latin Church and the first to mention a Latin Bible”. The account is also one of the earliest documents of Christianity in Africa, and among the earliest specimens of the Acts of the Apostles genre from the Roman province of Africa.

== Acts of the Scillitan Martyrs ==
According to the Acts of the Scillitan Martyrs, the trial and execution by beheading occurred in Carthage under the authority of the proconsul of the Roman province, Publius Vigellius Saturninus, whom Tertullian names as the first persecutor of Christians in Africa. The trial is notable as the accused were not subjected to torture.

The Scillitans were twelve in all—seven men and five women. Their names were Speratus, Nartzalus, Cintinus (Cittinus), Veturius, Felix, Aquilinus, Laetantius, Januaria, Generosa, Vestia, Donata, and Secunda. Two of these bear Punic names (Nartzalus, Cintinus); the others are Latin names. Six had already been tried.

Speratus was their spokesman. He stated that he and his companions had led quiet and moral lives, paying their taxes and doing no wrong to their neighbors. When called upon to swear by the name of the emperor Marcus Aurelius, Speratus replied "I recognize not the empire of this world; but rather do I serve that God whom no man hath seen, nor with these eyes can see," a reference to the First Epistle to Timothy.

== Veneration and legacy ==
A basilica dedicated to the Scillitan martyrs was built in Carthage.

Agobard, the archbishop of Lyon from c. 779–840, stated that the relics of Speratus and Cyprian were translated on Charlemagne's orders from Carthage to Lyon.

Bishop Joseph Barber Lightfoot discussed the Scillitan martyrs in his Epistles of Ignatius and Polycarp of 1885.

== See also ==
- Acts of the Martyrs
- Libellus
- San Sperate
