= Publius Vigellius Saturninus =

Publius Vigellius Saturninus was a Roman senator, who was active during the reign of Marcus Aurelius. He is best known as the official who presided at the trial of the Scillitan Martyrs, dated to 17 July 180.

His complete name is attested in inscriptions as Publius Vigellius Raius Plarius Saturninus Atilius Braduanus Caucidius Tertullus. His origins are not known for certain, although Géza Alföldy believed he came from the Greek-speaking part of the empire. Bernard Rémy claims that based on the elements in his name Saturninus is related to Herodes Atticus.

Only portions of the cursus honorum of Saturninus, drawn from various sources, remain. His earliest recorded office, based on an inscription on a statue base found at Troesmis was as legatus legionis or commander of Legio V Macedonica. It had been thought this brief inscription was evidence that he had been governor of Moesia Inferior, but Alföldy has shown that it is more accurately interpreted as evidence for his command of the V Macedonica. Both Rémy and Alföldy date his commission as extending from the year 159 to 162. Another post he is attested as holding is governor of the imperial province of Lycia et Pamphylia, which Rémy dated from 162 to 164. His term as suffect consul followed.

The latest office Saturninus is recorded as holding was one of the apices of a successful consular career, proconsular governor of Africa, which was in 180/181; since a senator was eligible for this office about fifteen years after his consulate, his consulate can be estimated to have been around the year 165. It was during his tenure in Africa that he presided over the trial of the six African Christians known as the Scillitan Martyrs in Carthage.

His life after he stepped down from the governorship is unknown. According to Tertullian's writings, he lost his eyesight in his later years.
