= Pliny the Younger on Christians =

Pliny the Younger's views about Christianity

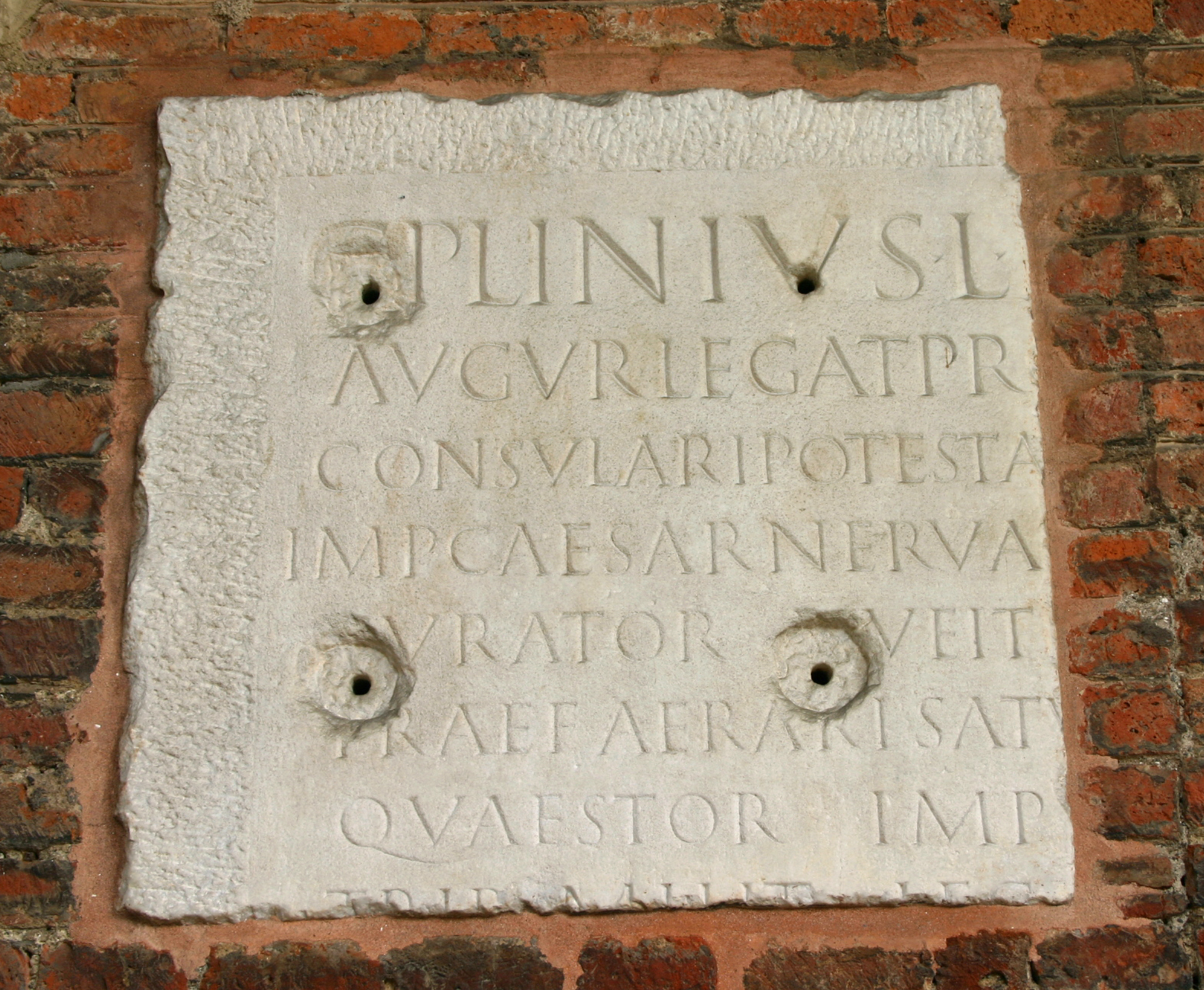
Fragment of an inscription bearing the name Pliny, Basilica of Sant'Ambrogio, Milan

Pliny the Younger, the Roman governor of Bithynia and Pontus (now in modern Turkey), wrote a letter to Emperor Trajan around AD 110 and asked for counsel on dealing with the early Christian community. The letter (Epistulae X.96) details an account of how Pliny conducted trials of suspected Christians who appeared before him as a result of anonymous accusations and asks for the Emperor's guidance on how they should be treated.

Neither Pliny nor Trajan mention the crime that Christians were supposed to have committed, except for being a Christian; and other historical sources do not provide a simple answer to what that crime could be, but most likely due to the stubborn refusal of Christians to worship Roman gods; making them appear as objecting to Roman rule.

Pliny states that he gives Christians multiple chances to affirm they are innocent and if they refuse three times, they are executed. Pliny states that his investigations have revealed nothing on the Christians' part but harmless practices and "depraved, excessive superstition." However, Pliny seems concerned about the rapid spread of their practices and views Christian gatherings as a potential starting point for sedition.

The letter is the first pagan account to refer to Christianity, providing key information on early Christian beliefs and practices and how these were viewed and dealt with by the Romans. The letter and Trajan's reply indicate that at the time of its writing there was no systematic and official persecution of Christians in the Roman Empire. There was persecution of Christians before this but only on a local basis, like the Neronian persecution in Rome or the expulsion of Jewish-Christians and Jews from Rome by order of Claudius. Trajan's reply also offers valuable insight into the relationship between Roman provincial governors and Emperors and indicates that at the time Christians were not sought out or tracked down by imperial orders, and that persecutions could be local and sporadic.

== Context and overview ==
=== Background ===
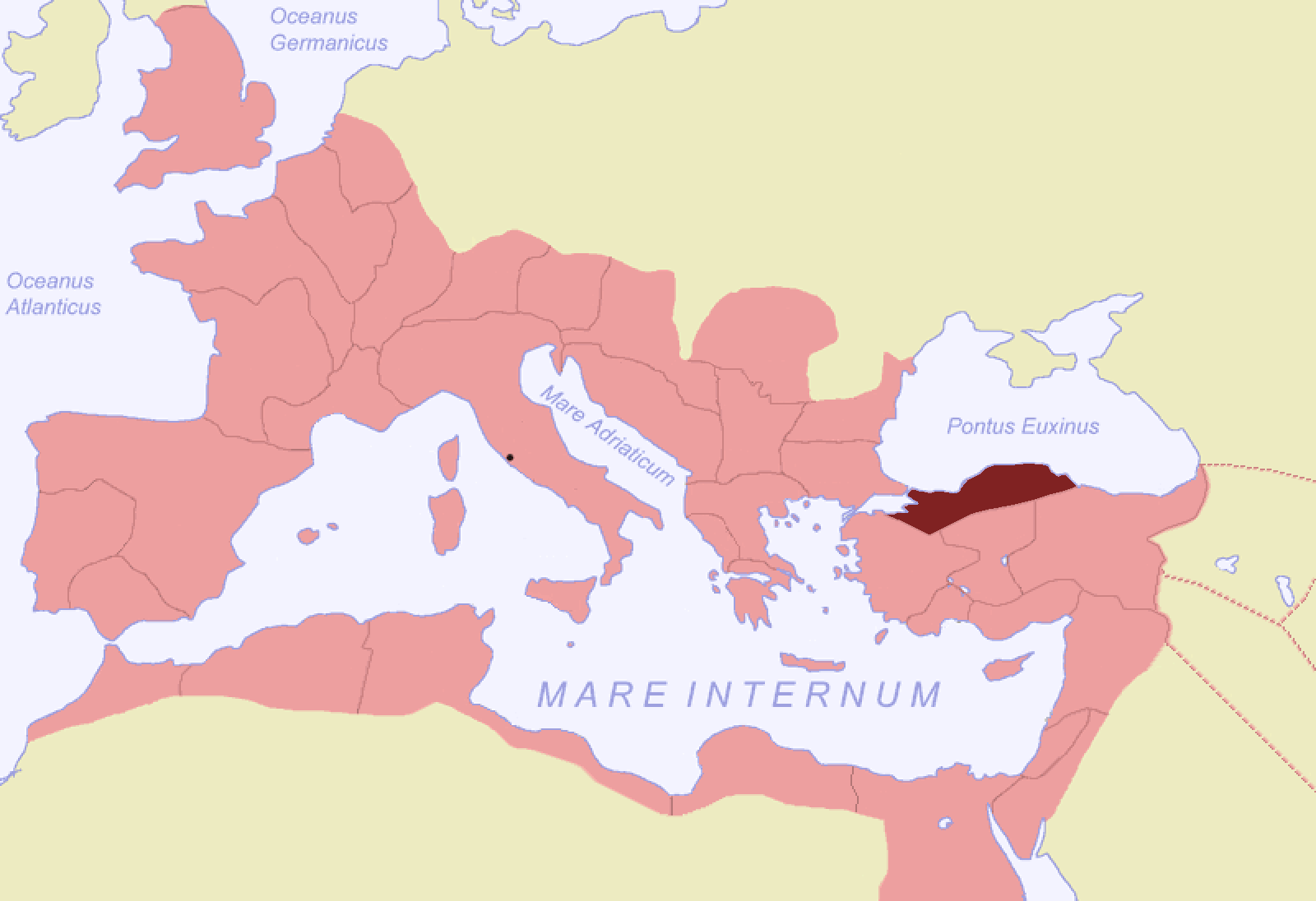
Location of Bithynia and Pontus within the Roman Empire

Pliny the Younger was the governor of Bithynia and Pontus on the Black Sea coast of Anatolia, having arrived there as the representative of Emperor Trajan between 109 and 111 AD on September 17. Pliny likely wrote the letters from Amisus. The origin of Christianity in that region is not known, but it has not been associated with Paul the Apostle's travels. Given the reference to Bithynia in the opening of the First Epistle of Peter (most likely written during the reign of Domitian in AD 81), Christianity in the region may have had some Petrine associations through Silas.

In 111 Bithynia and Pontus was known for being in disorder, and Pliny was selected by Trajan because of his legal training and his past experience. Pliny was familiar with the region, having defended two of their proconsuls for extortion in the Senate, one case being around AD 103. However, Pliny had never performed a legal investigation of Christians, and thus consulted Trajan in order to be on solid ground regarding his actions, and saved his letters and Trajan's replies. The way he expressed his lack of familiarity with the procedure may indicate that such prosecutions against Christians had taken place before (namely in Rome), but Pliny had not been involved in them.

As governor, Pliny held large influence over all of the residents of his province. This was especially true in the legal treatment of Christians. The Roman legal construct of cognitio extra ordinem afforded governors a large amount of discretion in deciding legal cases.

=== Persecution of Christians ===
Prior to the 249 Decius edict which would require all inhabitants of the Roman Empire to sacrifice to the Roman gods, the persecution of Christians was based on local determinations. Timothy Barnes characterizes the situation by stating: "Actual persecution…was local, sporadic, almost random". During this period, individual governors treated Christians very differently depending on the public and social issues, e.g. Tertullian wrote that no Christian blood was shed in Africa prior to 180.

Although it is clear that Pliny executed Christians, neither Pliny nor Trajan mention the crime that Christians had committed, except for being a Christian; and other historical sources do not provide a simple answer to this question. Trajan's response to Pliny makes it clear that being known as a "Christian" was sufficient for judicial action.

Everett Ferguson states that the charges against Christians by Pliny may have been partly based on the "secret crimes" associated with Christianity, later characterized by Athenagoras as atheism, cannibalistic feasts and incest. The cannibalistic feasts and incest charges were based on misunderstanding of the Eucharistic act and Christians being "brothers and sisters", even after marriage. However, the charge of atheism related to the failure to worship the state gods, and made Christianity a superstition and not a religion. George Heyman states that the refusal of Christians to participate in sacrificial rituals that honored the emperor and instead follow their own sacrificial rhetoric and practices conflicted with the Roman forms of social control, making them an undesirable minority. However Eusebius (E.H. 9.7) asserts that it was fear of the gods being displeased by the Christians' refusal to worship them causing disasters to fall on cities that led to persecution. Ferguson states that Pliny viewed the obstinacy (contumacia) of Christians, as as much of a threat to Roman rule and order as the divergence of their beliefs from the Romans; and considered Christian gatherings as a potential starting point for sedition.

== Letter and response ==
=== Pliny's letter to Trajan ===
==== Opening questions ====
Letters of Pliny the Younger, Paris, 1826 (Click to read)

Pliny opens the letter (sections 1–4) with questions to Trajan concerning trials of Christians brought before him, since he says he has never been present at any trials of Christians. This may indicate that previous trials had taken place and that Pliny was unaware of any existing edicts under Trajan for prosecuting Christians. He has three main questions:

- Should any distinction be made by the age of the Christian? Should the very young be treated differently from mature people?
- Does denying being a Christian mean the accused is pardoned?
- Is the “name” of Christianity itself enough to condemn the accused or is it the crimes associated with being a Christian? (Nomen ipsum si flagitiis careat an flagitia cohaerentia nomini puniantur.)

A. N. Sherwin-White states that “When the practice of a sect was banned, indictment of the nomen (“name”), i.e. of membership of a cult group, sufficed to secure conviction. This looked uncommonly like religious persecution to the victims themselves, but the underlying ground remained the flagitia ("shameful acts") supposed to be inseparable from the practice of the cult.”

==== Trial format ====
Reading of Pliny's letter to Trajan about the Christians, in Latin with English subtitles

Pliny gives an account of how the trials are conducted and the various verdicts (sections 4–6). He says he first asks if the accused is a Christian: if they confess that they are, he interrogates them twice more, for a total of three times, threatening them with death if they continue to confirm their beliefs. If they do not recant, then he orders them to be executed, or, if they are Roman citizens, orders them to be taken to Rome. Despite his uncertainty about the offences connected with being Christian, Pliny says that he has no doubt that, whatever the nature of their creed, at least their inflexible obstinacy (obstinatio) and stubbornness (pertinacia) deserve punishment. This shows that, to the Roman authorities, Christians were being hostile to the government and were openly defying a magistrate who was asking them to abandon an unwanted cult. Most notably, the Christians present at these trials Pliny is inquiring about were accused by a privately published anonymous document and not by Pliny nor the empire.

There were three categories of accused Pliny mentions with corresponding verdicts. If the accused denied that they had ever been a Christian, then once they had prayed to the Roman gods (in words dictated by Pliny himself), offered incense and wine to images of Trajan and the gods, and cursed Christ – which Pliny says true Christians are unable to do – they were then discharged. Accused who were at one point Christians but had quit the religion also followed the aforementioned procedure and were let go. Sherwin-White says the procedure was approved by Trajan but it was not a way to "compel conformity to the state religion or imperial cult", which was a voluntary practice. Those who confessed to being Christians three times were executed.

==== Practices of Christians ====
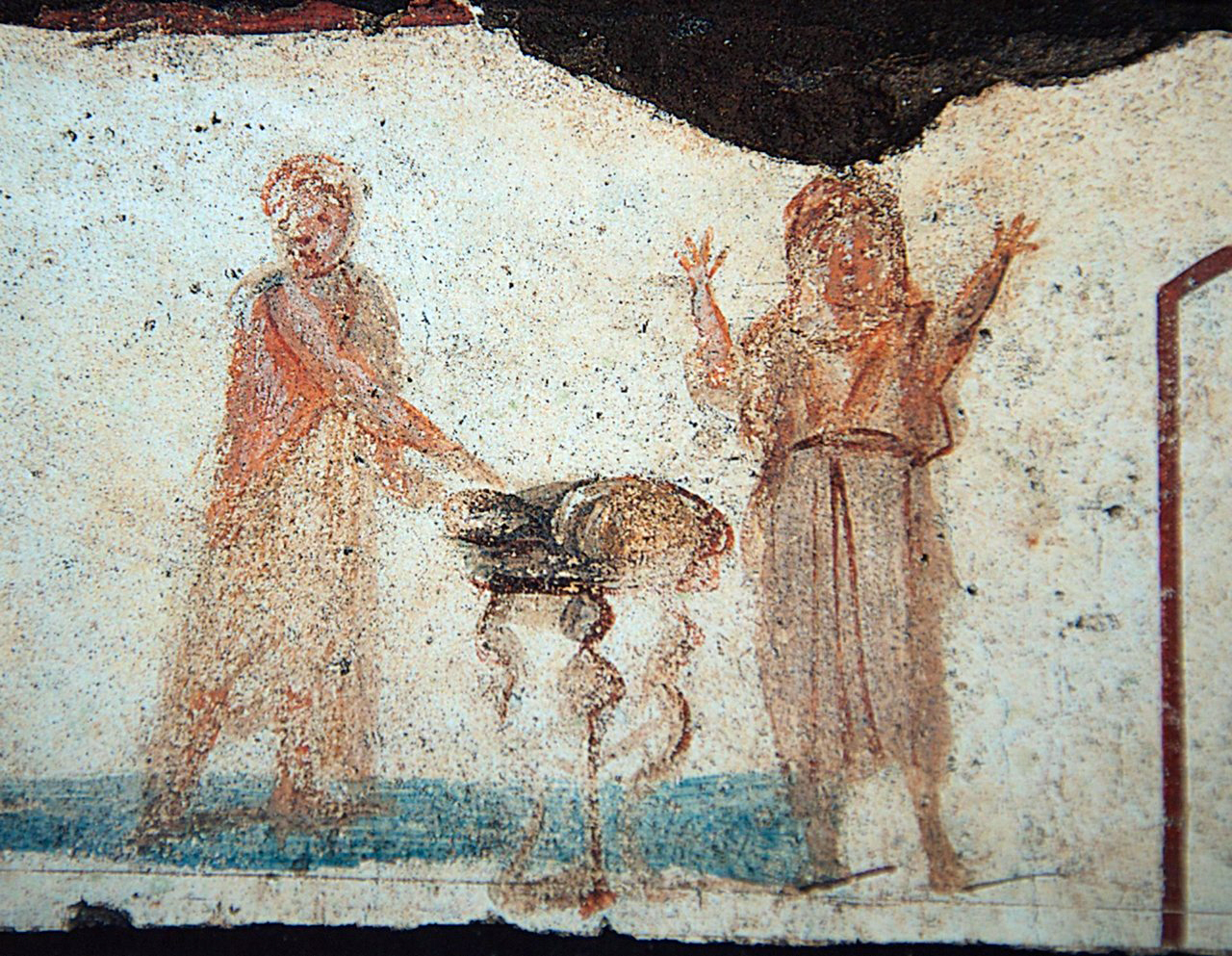
Depiction of Christian Eucharistic bread, Catacomb of Callixtus, 3rd century

Pliny then details the practices of Christians (sections 7–10): he says that they meet on a certain day before light where they gather and sing hymns to Christ as to a god. They all bind themselves by oath, "not to some crimes", says Pliny, as though that is what he would have expected; rather, they pledge not to commit any crimes such as fraud, theft, or adultery, and subsequently share a meal of "ordinary and innocent food". Pliny says, however, that all of these practices were abandoned by the Christians after Pliny forbade any political associations (hetaeriai or "fraternities"). These clubs were banned because Trajan saw them as a "natural breeding ground for grumbling" about both civic life and political affairs. One such instance of a banned club was a firemen's association; likewise, Christianity was seen as a political association that could be potentially harmful to the empire.

Pliny adds that he felt it necessary to investigate further by having two female slaves called deaconesses tortured, which was standard procedure in Roman interrogation of slaves, and discovered nothing but "depraved, excessive superstition" (superstitio). By using this word instead of religio, religion, Pliny is "denigrating the Christians' position" because it was outside the religious practices of Rome. The apparent abandonment of the pagan temples by Christians was a threat to the pax deorum, the harmony or accord between the divine and humans, and political subversion by new religious groups was feared, which was treated as a potential crime.

Pliny ends the letter by saying that Christianity is endangering people of every age and rank and has spread not only through the cities, but also through the rural villages as well (neque tantum ... sed etiam), but that it will be possible to check it. He argues for his procedure to Trajan by saying that the temples and religious festivals, which before had been deserted, are now flourishing again and that there is a rising demand for sacrificial animals once more – a dip and rise which A. N. Sherwin-White believes is an exaggeration of the toll Christianity had taken on the traditional cult.

=== Trajan’s response ===
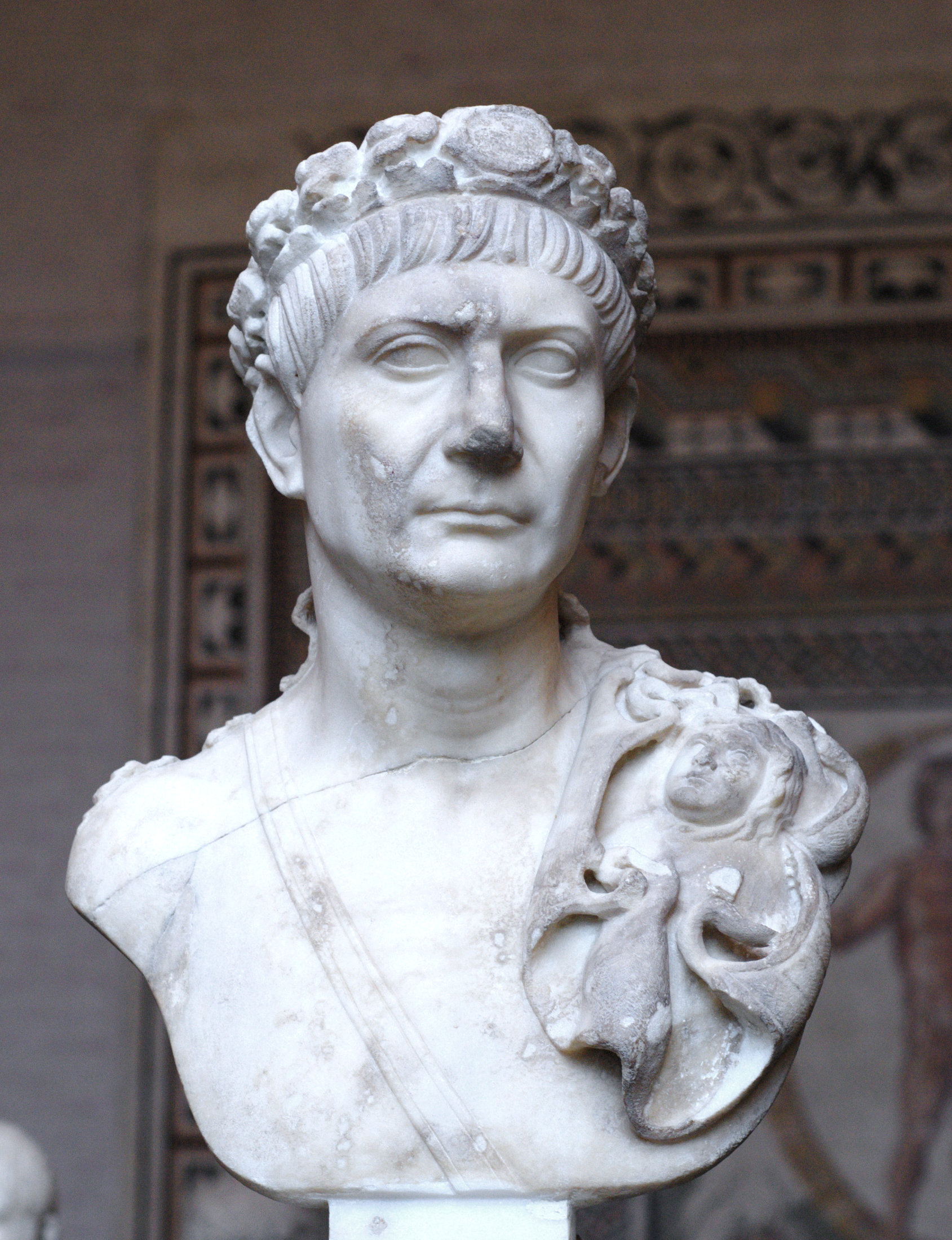
Trajan statue, Glyptothek, Munich

Trajan's short reply to Pliny affirms Pliny's overall procedure and gives four orders:

1. Do not seek out the Christians for trial.
2. If the accused are found guilty of being Christian, then they must be punished.
3. If the accused deny they are Christians and show proof that they are not by worshipping the gods, then they must be pardoned.
4. Anonymous accusations should not be considered.

Leonard L. Thompson calls the policy "double-edged", since, "on the one hand, Christians were not hunted down. They were tried only if accusations from local provincials were brought against them. But if accused and convicted, then Christians ... were killed simply for being Christians." Therefore, Pliny's view of the treatment of Christians was not necessarily persecution but rather that Christians were executed only when they were brought before him at trial and confessed; however, pardons were also given to those who denied such charges. Ste. Croix says the recommended course of action "was 'accusatory' and not 'inquisitorial'", so that it was never the governors themselves but instead private, local accusers (delatores) who brought forth accusations.

== Authenticity ==
The received scholarly consensus is that this correspondence is authentic. More recently, the authenticity of Pliny's letter was questioned: a stylometric comparison indicates the authenticity of Pliny’s letter, and suggests instead the presence of large amounts of interpolation in the text of the letter.

== Significance ==
If it is genuine, Pliny's letter is the earliest pagan account to refer to early Christians and provides a key description of Roman administrative process and problems, and also provides valuable evidence as to the attitudes of the Roman authorities with regard to early Christianity. The document seems to show that the Roman Empire, as a government entity, did not at this time "seek out" Christians for prosecution or persecution. Although Emperor Trajan gives Pliny specific advice about disregarding anonymous accusations, for example, he was deliberate in not establishing any new rules in regard to the Christians. In doing so, Trajan allowed Pliny to try cases according to his discretion.

The letter as it is presented supports the existence of the early Christian Church and its rapid growth.

== Later impact ==
Several ancient Christian writers mentioned the correspondence between Pliny and Trajan and its circumstances, and often embellished the account.

The first of them was the Latin writer Tertullian in the year 197, in his Apologeticum (2,6-7), a defence of Christianity. This work contains "a selective paraphrase" of the correspondence. Tertullian used it to support his point that, in legal theory, it was forbidden to track Christians down.

Later, in the early fourth century, the Greek writer Eusebius of Caesarea mentioned the episode in his Church History. He did not have access to Pliny's original, but to Tertullian's paraphrase. He modified the story, among other things, by stating that Pliny asked Trajan for advice because so many Christians were put to death. (Historically, it was rather because Christianity raised complex legal questions and Pliny wanted to be safe from criticism.)

Around 402, Rufinus of Aquileia embellished the account further in a Latin version of Eusebius's work. He had access to Tertullian and Eusebius, but again probably not to Pliny's original. His modifications include accentuating Pliny's compassion for the Christians, and eliminating his scepticism about Christ as a god.

== Other Roman sources ==
Pliny is one of three key Roman authors who refer to early Christians, the other two being Tacitus and Suetonius. These authors refer to events which take place during the reign of various Roman emperors, Suetonius writing about an expulsion from Rome of Jews because of disturbances instigated by a certain "Chrestus" during the reign of Claudius (41 to 54), and also punishments by Nero (who reigned from 54 to 68), Tacitus referring to Nero's actions after the Great Fire of Rome in 64 AD, while Pliny writes to Trajan. The chronological order for the documentation begins with Pliny writing around 111 AD and continues with Tacitus writing in the Annals around 115/116 AD and then Suetonius writing in the Lives of the Twelve Caesars around 122 AD.
