= Acts of the Martyrs =

Set of early Christian texts

Acts of the Martyrs (Latin: Acta Martyrum) are accounts of the suffering and death of Christian martyrs which were collected and used in early Catholic church liturgies, as attested by Saint Augustine.

Their authenticity varies, the most reliable derive from accounts of trials such as that of Saint Cyprian or of the Scillitan Martyrs. Although, some claim that the latter has been embellished with miraculous and apocryphal material. As it stands, few of these trial accounts survive.

A second, the Passiones, includes the martyrdoms of Saint Ignatius of Antioch, Saint Polycarp, and the Martyrs of Lyons, the famous Acts of Perpetua and Felicitas, and the Passion of Saint Irenaeus. In these accounts, miraculous elements are restricted, which proved to be unpopular and was often later embellished with legendary material.

A third category includes accounts that are believed by some to be largely or purely legendary. The Acts of Saint Catherine of Alexandria and those of Saint George fall into this category.

Eusebius of Caesarea was likely the first Christian author to produce a collection of Acts of the Martyrs.

A related form of writing was chivalric romances, which either preserved a few kernels of fact in popular or literary tradition, or were works of pure imagination. Nonetheless, they were intended to edify rather than deceive the reader.

Romances should be separated from hagiographical forgeries, whose intent was to alter history by, for example, falsely attaching a saint's name to a particular place.

== Origins ==
The expression Acta Martyrum generally applies to all narrative texts about the deaths of the martyrs, but it possesses a more precise and restricted meaning referring, in technical terms, to the official records of the trials and convictions. These official records were shorthands and were transcribed by the officials of the court chancery (notarius exceptor) to be preserved in its archives. Due to this relationship with the court of the proconsul, they were also called "proconsulares" (Acta proconsularia). Once the distinction is made, the name of the act is reserved for the verbal processes (such as Acta Martyrum Scyllitanorum). For references relating to the martyrs, the name of passio is applied in all of its diverse forms (Gesta, Martyrium, Legenda). Such a distinction is also justified by the different purpose and nature of both types of documents: the records have no hagiographic character, while the Passions are characterized by their purpose and edifying religious sense.

The preserved records are limited to about a dozen fragments, so most of the narrative texts about the martyrs are the Passions. The scarcity of official records and direct documentation has been controversial. The old Christian communities had a great interest in maintaining the memory of their martyrs, as proven by the news referenced in the story of the martyrdom of Polycarp (m. 156), whose memory was venerated annually in İzmir. Cyprian used to recommend his clerics take detailed notes of the deaths of the martyrs.^{note4} These valuable testimonies were also the oldest news about the martyrs. According to what is known to date, there is no precise idea of the extent to which Christians transcribed the records of the trials; it is undoubtedly very likely that some of those who witnessed the development of stenography in their text, in the same manner as the notarius of the court, gave it to the community for preservation in the archives of the church. This hypothesis seems to be confirmed by the details and notes of the judge or martyr and seems to interrupt the rigid protocol form. On the other hand, it did not prove easy for Christians to obtain copies of the verbal processes that were saved in the proconsular archive; on occasion, large sums had to be paid.^{Note5}. No precedents have been preserved that allow us to know if the Church of Rome, which had organized a section of notaries, took the initiative of collecting the records of its martyrs, nor is the news that Julius Africanus did a similar task as far as Rome is concerned, trustworthy.^{note6} Information about the other communities is still less certain.

During the persecutions of Diocletian, there appears to have been a wholesale destruction of documents. There are no traces suggesting that the churches were involved in restoring the destroyed hagiographic texts after the persecution ended. The events of later centuries, such as the western Germanic invasions in the fifth and sixth centuries, may have caused the irreparable loss of the writings still preserved.

== Division and classification ==
Given the enormous number of hagiographic texts and the heterogeneous nature of their origin, authority, and value, critics have proposed a classification to guide their study.

It has been observed that a classification of the texts based on the criterion of the authenticity of the martyr, or the legitimacy of his cult, is not valid or useful.

Similarly, a classification based on extrinsic characteristics, such as the one that divides the hagiographic documents in Acta, Passiones, Vitae, Miracula, Translationes, etc., according to the object of the story, is not useful. Neither does the classification meet the demands of criticism of two large groups, contemporary and subsequent documents, since it does not express anything about the value of the document.

According to Hippolyte Delehaye, the safest criterion is based on the degree of sincerity and historicity offered by the literary genre of the document.

According to this criterion, six groups of texts are established:

1. Verbal processes contained in official relations preceding the proconsular archives or direct transcriptions, such as the S. Cypriani Act, for example.
2. Accounts of eyewitnesses or trustworthy contemporaries, whether they are direct testimonies, testimonies of other people or of a mixed type, such as De martyribus Palaestinae by Eusebius of Cesarea.
3. Narrations from which information or a document can be extracted from one of the two preceding groups, such as the Menologion of Symeon Metaphrast.
4. Stories that, except for the name of the sepulcher and the cult of the martyr, lack a historical basis. One such example being that of Passio S. Felicitatis.
5. Purely fantastic stories, authentic products of the imagination, for example, Passio S. Nicephori.^{note7}
6. Narrations of legendary characters that falsify historical facts and can be defined as false.

Considering the elements that distinguish the six groups, it is possible to verify that the first and the second refer to a uniform type of text, owing to the contemporary and direct nature of the information presented. The next two groupings contain stories that, in varying degrees, are based on at least partially reliable data. The last two, on the other hand, are true fantasies without historical basis.

Following the same criteria as Delehaye, the texts can be classified into three simpler groups:

- Official records and accounts of direct testimonies.
- Narratives based on documents belonging either to the first group or, on a certain number of safe historical elements.
- Novels or hagiographic fantasies.

== Literary scheme ==
Except for the official records, all of the narrative documents mentioned above offer, from a literary point of view, common characters, since they are all the result of an elaboration and compositional process typical of hagiographic literature. The tendency to the schematic form has a remote origin, and whose footprint, already manifested in ancient texts, is very close to the type and narrative sincerity of the original story. This has happened, for example, in the Martyrium Polycarpi, in which it is possible to recognize the attempt of the hagiographer to assimilate the death of the martyr to that of Christ.^{note8} This theme, of the martyr who imitates Christ, appears already in the first Christian writers.^{note9} From the fourth century on, certain patterns or essential criteria are fixed, and the hagiographers adopt certain narrative characteristics that became the literary genre of the passions.

In the first place, the legal tone of the Roman criminal process in the first records has been preserved; sometimes even some of the passions make reference to it, showing how, on more than one occasion, the lost records served as sources. The introductory formula of the consular date of the records preserves the indication of the emperor, governor or proconsul, even in historically erroneous cases. The phases of the procedure—arrest, appearance, interrogation, torture, judgment and torment—preserve and constitute the structure of the narrative; likewise, the protagonists, usually few in number, of the ancient records are preserved: the martyr, the judge or magistrate, and the executioner; in the second place, the Christian spectators who animate their companion; and, finally, the hostile mass of the pagans. On a similar scheme, the evolutionary process of the passions develops, throughout the fourth until the twentieth century, with successive enrichment and formal improvements, including fantasies, common places, and errors, due to both ignorance and blind piety of the hagiographers. These unsubstantiated relationships can be broken down like this:

- The apostle and even the small initial group of martyrs came to be united with topographically or liturgically close groups;
- The figure of the persecutor was typified as the cruelest of those known and traditionally considered as such: Decius, Valerian and Diocletian; and the same happened with the figure of the governor (praeses, proconsularis), who was often called Anulinus, a historical figure of the fourth century.
- The interrogation was prolonged in an inordinate way, often putting into the mouth of the martyr professions of faith imitating the theology of the time and the New Testament writings;
- The martyr was made to pronounce controversial discourses, plagiarizing the content of other works, generally apologetic writings, addressed to the pagans or against heresies.

The same happened with the narrations of the pains and tortures, prolonged and multiplied without saving prodigies made by the martyr, adorned with spectacular elements provided by fantasy and legend. This transformation and development, negative from the critical point of view, was influenced by several factors to a considerable degree: the spread of the cult of the relics, with its inevitable abuses; veneration of the martyred saint, as patron saint of the city, monastery or church, which obliged the writer to find or invent a living; the particularly religious and devout environment of the Middle Ages, favored by the monks, who were among the most active writers of the hagiographic texts.

== Compilation ==
Dispensing from the first records collected, which are incomplete and are already considered lost, it can be said that the first compiler was Eusebius of Cesarea, of whom the title of the writing of martyribus is known,^{note10} which unfortunately has been lost. On the other hand, Martyribus Palestinae is preserved.^{note11} This was the only collection known in Rome during the sixth century, in the time of St. Gregory the Great, as the Pope himself informed the bishop and patriarch of Alexandria, Eulogio, who had requested documentation about the collections of Gesta Martyrum.^{note12} At almost the same time, a great martyrology was forming, called Jeronimiano, with the commemorations of all the martyrs, which grouped the oldest martyrologies of the churches. This fact is important because the compilation of many of the passions is intimately related to this martyrology, which served as a starting point. Later, parallel to the disclosure of the narratives of the Gesta Martyrum, there was a need to synthesize them into succinct stories, including those in the most known martyrologies at that time: those composed by Saint Bede the Venerable in the eighth century and Florus of Lyon, Atto and Usuard in the ninth century. These had at their disposal the data of the passions and adapted them to the liturgical commemoration of the calendar; some of them, especially Adón, had no critical concern and used the texts without evaluating them, confusing and distorting data and news. Because of such information, these medieval martyrologies were called historical martyrologies.

Something similar happened in the Eastern Church, where the numerous passions were collected in abbreviated form in the liturgical books, for example, in the saints (menaea), in which an appointment was introduced for each day of the 12 months of the year about the life and martyrdom of the saint. The same happened with the menologies, also divided into 12 volumes, corresponding to the 12 months of the year; in them, the passions are synthesized in a more extensive way than in the preceding ones. In the tenth century, Symeon the Metaphrast composed a menology, transcribing and adapting fragments of ancient passions, some of which only survive through him. During the late Middle Ages, numerous collections of lives of Saints, Passionists, Legendaries, etc. were made, which are still found in various codices of European libraries; others, on the other hand, were recast arbitrarily in other compilations later printed and translated in vulgar language; thus constituting a copious literature that reaches until the Renaissance.

== Hagiographic critique ==
It is difficult to determine the authenticity of the Acta Martyrum. The first attempt to determine the authentic records was that of Benedictine Thierry Ruinart, who collected and published 117 texts that he considered genuine. ^{note13} These were not of equal provenance, since only 74 contained the text of the passions, while the rest were paragraphs and fragments taken from old Christian writers like Eusebio, John Chrysostom, Basil and Prudentius, whose hymns had extracted paragraphs about the martyrs Hippolytus of Rome and Saint Lawrence. In most cases they are historical figures, but the selection of the texts was not systematic, nor was it accompanied by a critical analysis. Ruinart, who had a rather vague idea of the purpose of its collection, only intended to make known the oldest and most trustworthy document for each of the martyrs, with the intention of excluding falsified documents.

In 1882, Edmond-Frederic Le Blant had the idea to continue and complete the compilation of Ruinart and added another group of records, which he considered authentic by the adequacy of the narrative with the Roman legal phrases. The criterion of Le Blant is not firm and shows how difficult it is to authenticate records; the various authentic Acta Martyrum lists, which other authors have sketched or compiled later, do not represent the result of a rigorous and scientific analysis but rather are amendments of Ruinart's work.

With much greater seriousness, although very slowly, they are occupied with these works according to an organic plan by the Bollandists. In recent years, a series of principles and norms of hagiographic criticism have been proposed in relation to the records by several specialists, such as H. Achelis, J. Geffken, and A. Harnack in Germany; P. Allard and J. Leclercq in France; the Jesuit F. Grossi-Gondi, Luigi Lanzoni, and Pio Franchi de 'Cavalieri in Italy. The most valuable contribution, however, is due to the Bollandist H. Delehaye, from whose writings it is possible to extract a critical summation. He has contributed, in effect, the safest classification of the records; he has pointed out the various components of a martyr's dossier; he has reconstructed the iteration of the legend, underscoring the special function of the massa and local traditions; he has studied hagiographic documents parallel to the narrative texts, such as martyrologies and synaxes; and he has established the different value of literary, liturgical, and monumental sources, specifically establishing that of chronological and topographical data (doctrine of hagiographic coordinates). In summary, he has outlined and perfected the discipline of the method. It has been said, with a certain air of reproach, that the hagiographic criticism has been interested until the present, almost exclusively in the problems related to the authenticity and chronology of the document, neglecting the social aspect and the environment in which it was written, aspects that in turn help determine the same chronology. It has been insisted, therefore, on the need to "identify the cultural and religious concepts expressed in the document and establish a reference to the social environment where the text comes from and to which it is addressed".

== Notes ==
1. For example Esteban (Hch 7, 54) or Antipas (Ap 2, 13).
2. Real Academia Española. Diccionario Usual, voz "mártir".
3. Cf. Martyrium Polycarpi 18.
4. Cf. Epistola 12, 2: «dies quibus excedunt adnote»; see also Epistola 39, 2.
5. Cf. Passio Probi, Tarachi et Andrinici, BHG 1574.
6. Cf. Passio S. Symphorosae, BHL 7971;Acta Sanctorumjul. IV, 355.
7. Cf. BHG 1331-1334.
8. Cf. Hans von Campenhause
9. CF. Victricius, De laude Sanctorum, 56.
10. Cf. Historia ecclesiastica V, proemio en PG, 408.
11. Cf. Hist. eccl., VII, apendice.
12. Cf. Gregorio I, Registrum epistolarum VIII,29.
13. Cf. Acta Primorum martyrum sincera, Paris 1689.

== Bibliography ==
- Acta Sanctorum (various editors)
- Aigrain R. (1953). L'hagiographie, ses sources, ses méthodes, son histoire. Paris. Bloud & Gay.
- BHG, 3 ed., Brussels 1957
- DACL 1, 373–446
- Delehaye H. (1934). Cinq leçons sur la méthode hagiographique. Brussels
- Delehaye H. (1933). Les origines du culte des martyrs, 2.ª ed. Brussels
- Delehaye H. (1955). Les légendes hagiographiques, 4.ª ed. Brussels
- Delehaye H. (1966). Les passions des martyrs et les genres littéraires, 2.ª ed. Brussels
- Delehaye H. (1927). Sanctus. Brussels.
- Gallina C. (1939). I martiri dei Primi Secoli. Florence.
- Gebhardt O.v. (1902). Acta martyrum selecta. Berlin A. Duncker.
- Grossi-Gondi F. (1919). Principi e problemi di critica agiografica. Rome.
- Knopf R. (1929). Ausgewählte Märtyrer Briefen, 3.ª ed. Tübingen.
- Pezzella S. (1965). Gli atti dei martiri. Introduzione a una storia dell'antica agiografia. Rome.
- Quasten J. (2004). Patrología I. BAC.
- Quenti H. (1908). Les martyrologes historiques au moyen Age. Paris. V. Lecoffre, J. Gabalda
- Ruinart T. (1659). Acta primorum martyrum sincera. Paris. Regensburg.
- Rütten F. (1955). Lateinische Märtyrerakten und Märtyrer Briefen, 3.ª ed. Münster
- Ruiz Bueno D. (1951). Actas de los mártires. Madrid. BAC.
- Schwerd, A. (1960). Lateinische Märtyrerakten, Munich. BHL, 2, Brussels 1898–1901.
