= David (Dovid) Eliezrie =

Rabbi David (Dovid) Eliezrie (October 1951) is a member of the Chabad-Lubavitch movement and the founder, director and spiritual leader of North County Chabad/Congregation Beth Meir HaCohen in Yorba Linda, California. He is an author, speaker, activist and Rohr Jewish Learning Institute advisory board member.

== Biography ==
=== Family ===
Rabbi Eliezrie was born in Canada and raised in California and Israel. He married Stella Ruta in 1973. They have 6 children: Jonathan (Yoni), Chana (Chani), Yehoshua, Naomi, Yosef, & Dina. Rabbi Eliezrie and his Wife Stella have many grandchildren.

=== Education ===
Rabbi Eliezrie attended Yeshivat Tomchei Temimim in Kfar Chabad and New York. He received Rabbinical Ordination in 1974.

== Rabbinical career ==
=== Campus work ===
In the late 1960s Chabad leader, Rabbi Menachem Mendel Schneerson began an initiative to reach Jewish college students. To connect with students on campus, the first Chabad House was opened at UCLA in 1969. In 1973, Eliezrie established the Chabad House at the University of Miami.

=== Community Chabad Shliach. ===
In 1981 a group in Anaheim, California requested Chabad send a rabbi to lead and help develop their community. Eliezrie moved to California and established Chabad in Anaheim. The center relocated to Yorba Linda in 1988, (coincidentally 1.5 miles from the Richard Nixon Library and Museum). Presently, the Chabad campus includes the Beth Meir HaCohen synagogue building, an education center, and a mikvah.

=== Teaching ===
As a Scholar-in-Residence for the National Jewish Retreat sponsored by Rohr Jewish Learning Institute, Eliezrie speaks on current issues, Jewish history, and Jewish observance.

=== Other Positions ===
Rabbi Eliezrie is president of the Rabbinical Council of Orange County and Long Beach.

== Community Activism ==
=== Chabad Leadership ===
Eliezrie coordinates Chabad international relief efforts during times of crises. He serves on the Internet Committee of Lubavitch World Headquarters, the Vaad of the International Kinus Hashluchim, and the JLI Advisory Board

=== Jewish Leadership ===
Rabbi Eliezrie is Chabad's representative to major Jewish organizations. He also serves as a board member of the Jewish Federation and Family Services of Orange County, California. He is member of the board of governors of the Jewish Agency for Israel

== Articles & Publications ==
=== Books ===
==== Rabbi Eliezrie is the author of two books ====
The Secret of Chabad, published 2015 by Toby Press. for which he one several awards including the winning the National Jewish Book Awards Dorot Foundation Award in Memory of Joy Ungerleider in 2015.

Undaunted, published in 2025 a biography of Rabbi Yosef Yitzchak (Joseph Isaac) Schneersohn (Yiddish: יוסף יצחק שניאורסאהן; 21 June 1880 – 28 January 1950) the sixth Rebbe (spiritual leader) of the Chabad Lubavitch Hasidic movement.

=== Articles ===
Rabbi Eliezrie is a contributor to Chabad.org, The Jerusalem Post, The Jewish Journal and the Orange County Register.

=== Cited in other works ===
Eliezrie has been an information source for other publications including; Relational Judaism by Ron Wolfson. And A Place For Our Future by Linda Rattner Nunn.
