= Apocalypse of John (disambiguation) =

The Apocalypse of John is commonly referred to as the Book of Revelation.

Apocalypse of John may also refer to:

- The Second Apocalypse of John, also called the First Apocryphal Apocalypse of John, Greek apocalypse
- The Apocalypse of John Chrysostom, also called the Second Apocryphal Apocalypse of John, Greek
- The Apocalypse of John the Little, Syriac apocalypse

== See also ==
- Apocalypse (disambiguation)
- Book of Revelation (disambiguation)
