= Second Apocalypse of John =

Greek Christian text

The Second Apocalypse of John is a pseudepigraphal Greek Christian text sometimes classified as among the New Testament apocrypha. It is falsely attributed to John of Patmos. Its date is uncertain and has been placed as early as the late fourth century and as late as the mid-ninth.

== Date and authorship ==
In form, the Second Apocalypse appears to have been influenced by the Questions and Answers of Ephraim the Syrian (died 373). An early date for its composition puts it in the late fourth or early fifth century. François Nau dated it no later than the early eighth century on the grounds that it appeared unaffected either by the rise of Islam in the seventh century or by Byzantine iconoclasm in the next. He thought it was written in Cyprus. Alice Whealey, however, argues that there are signs the author was writing with Muslims and iconoclasts in mind, which would place its composition during the iconoclast period (726–843). She argues that it was written in a place that experienced Islamic rule or at least attack (such as Cyprus). Tony Burke places its composition in 4th-century Roman Syria.

The earliest reference to the Second Apocalypse is found in a mid-ninth century scholion on Dionysius Thrax. It must have been written before this date. The scholiast, while clarifying that the Apocalypse of Paul was named for Paul of Samosata, notes that the apocalyptic text "called the Apocalypse of the Theologian" (i.e., the Second Apocalypse) was not in fact "of the one in the island of Patmos, God forbid, for that one [the Book of Revelation] is supremely true; but of a pseudonymous and spurious one".

The Second Apocalypse is pseudonymous, being falsely attributed to John of Patmos. For convenience, its anonymous author is sometimes called Pseudo-John of Patmos. On the basis of style, Nau identified the author of the Second Apocalypse as the same person who wrote what he called the Second Apocryphal Greek Apocalypse of Saint John, which is not an apocalypse but a collection of canons. It too is falsely attributed to John of Patmos. It consists of a series of answers given by Jesus to questions posed by John on matters of Christian ethics and rites.

== Content ==
The Second Apocalypse is a series of questions by John about the end times with answers by Jesus. It may have been written as a supplement to John of Patmos' Book of Revelation. It contains details about the physical appearance of the Beast and life on the New Earth. Its language and choice of imagery is distinctly rural. A date of composition after the early Muslim conquests of the seventh century has been invoked to explain the text's concern with the preservation of icons, crosses and bibles—all of which Jesus says he will bring up to Heaven before destroying the Earth. A reference to Christian emperors being driven like slaves and wailing like infants may reflect the author's disgust with their support of iconoclasm.

There will be "no risk of racial discrimination in Heaven", according to John Court, but no bodily resurrection either, according to the following passage:

Just as the bees do not differ one from another, but are all of the same appearance and size, so every human being will be at the resurrection. Not fair-skinned, nor red-skin, nor black, not Ethiopian nor different facial features, but all will rise with the same appearance and size. The whole human species will rise bodiless.

John Court, accepting an early date for the Second Apocalypse, identifies it as part of a "Johannine apocalyptic tradition", which also includes the Apocalypse of John Chrysostom, the Third Apocalypse of John and the Coptic Apocalypse of John. On the basis of her later dating, Whealey questions the validity of this classification. Nevertheless, the work is often classified as among the New Testament apocrypha.

== Manuscripts and translations ==
The first edition of the text by Andreas Birch was printed in 1804 and based on two Greek copies. Constantin von Tischendorf published a new edition in 1866 using five more Greek manuscripts. Most manuscripts are late and show progressive elaboration. The most reliable text, therefore, is probably the least elaborate.

The Second Apocalypse was early translated into Arabic. At least three Garshuni copies were known to Giuseppe Simone Assemani, indicating that the text was popular in Syriac circles. There is an English translation by Court.

== Bibliography ==
- Burke, Tony (2013). Secret Scriptures Revealed: A New Introduction to the Christian Apocrypha. William B. Eerdmans.
- Court, John M. (2000). The Book of Revelation and the Johannine Apocalyptic Tradition. Sheffield Academic Press. ISBN 978-1841270739.
- Nau, François (1914). "Une deuxième apocalypse apocryphe grecque de Saint Jean". Revue Biblique. 23 (2): 209–221. JSTOR 44101528.
- Whealey, Alice (2002). "The Apocryphal Apocalypse of John: A Byzantine Apocalypse from the Early Islamic Period". The Journal of Theological Studies. 53 (2): 533–540. doi:10.1093/jts/53.2.533.
