= Josephus on Jesus =

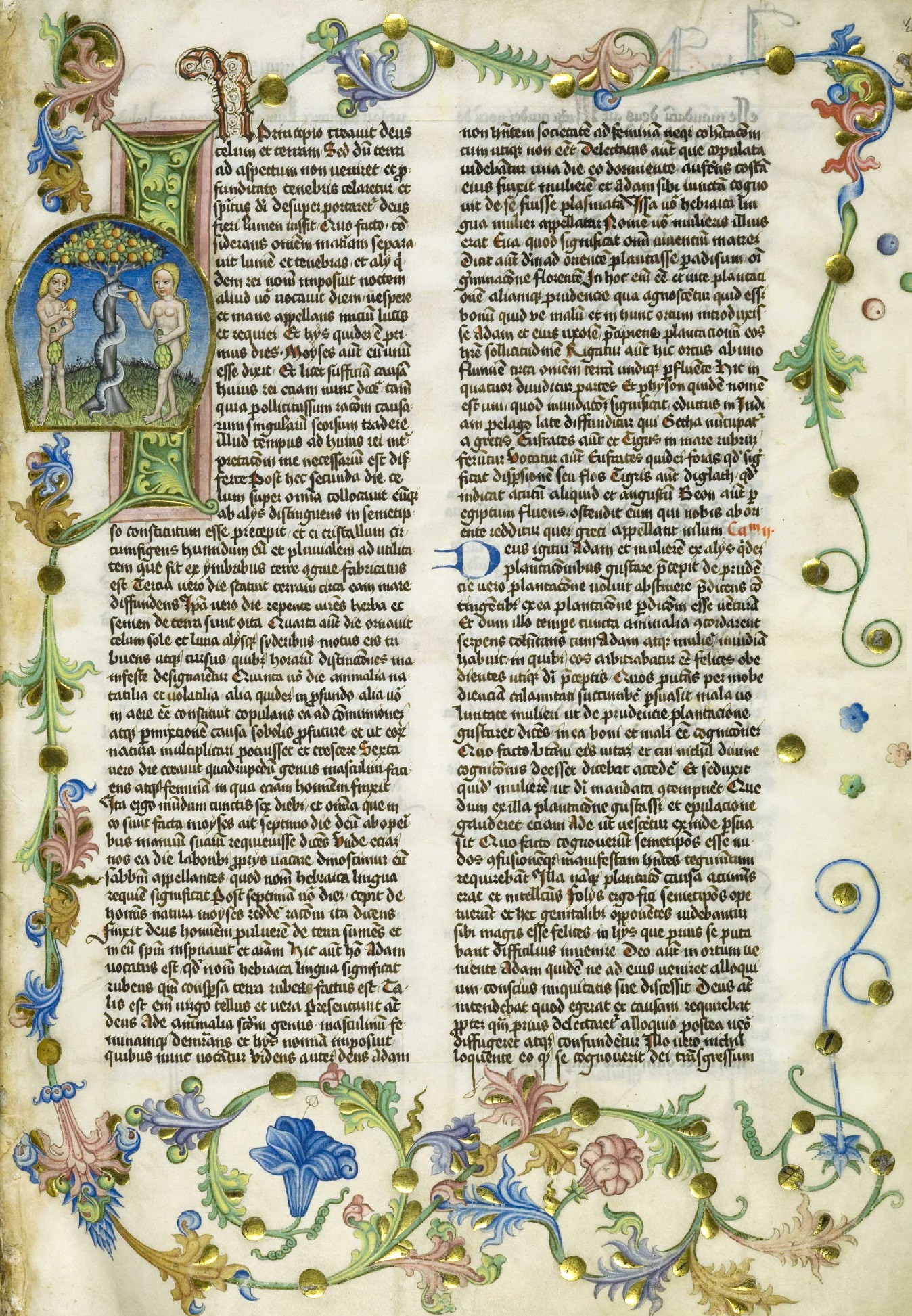
A 1466 edition of Antiquities of the Jews

Josephus was a first-century Jewish historian, general of Galilee during the First Jewish–Roman War, and relative of the high priestly families of the Second Temple who provided external information on some people and events found in the New Testament. Josephus was the military governor of Galilee, which is where Jesus ministered. He lived near Jesus's hometown of Nazareth for a time, and kept contact with groups such as the Sanhedrin and Ananus ben Ananus, who were involved in the trials of Jesus and his brother James. He wrote much about Galilee and its inhabitants in his autobiography The Life of Flavius Josephus, which was an appendix to Antiquities of the Jews. The extant manuscripts of Antiquities of the Jews, written c. 93–94, contain two references to Jesus of Nazareth and one reference to John the Baptist.

The first and most extensive reference to Jesus in the Antiquities, found in Book 18, states that Jesus was the Messiah and a wise teacher who was crucified by Pontius Pilate. It is commonly called the Testimonium Flavianum. The passage exists in all extant manuscripts of Antiquities. Since the late 20th century, the general consensus has held that the Testimonium is partially authentic in that an authentic nucleus referencing the life of Jesus was original to Josephus. However, the exact nature and scope of the original statement remains unclear. Many modern scholars believe that an Arabic version that was discovered by Shlomo Pines reflects the state of Josephus's original text.

Modern scholarship has largely acknowledged the authenticity of the second reference to Jesus in the Antiquities, found in Book 20, Chapter 9, which mentions "the brother of Jesus, who was called Christ, whose name was James".

Almost all modern scholars consider the reference in Book 18, Chapter 5 of the Antiquities to the imprisonment and death of John the Baptist also to be authentic and not a Christian interpolation. A number of differences exist between the statements by Josephus regarding the death of John the Baptist and the New Testament accounts. Scholars generally view these variations as indications that the Josephus passages are not interpolations, since a Christian interpolator would likely have made them correspond to the New Testament accounts, not differ from them. Scholars have provided explanations for their inclusion in Josephus's later works.

== Extant manuscripts ==
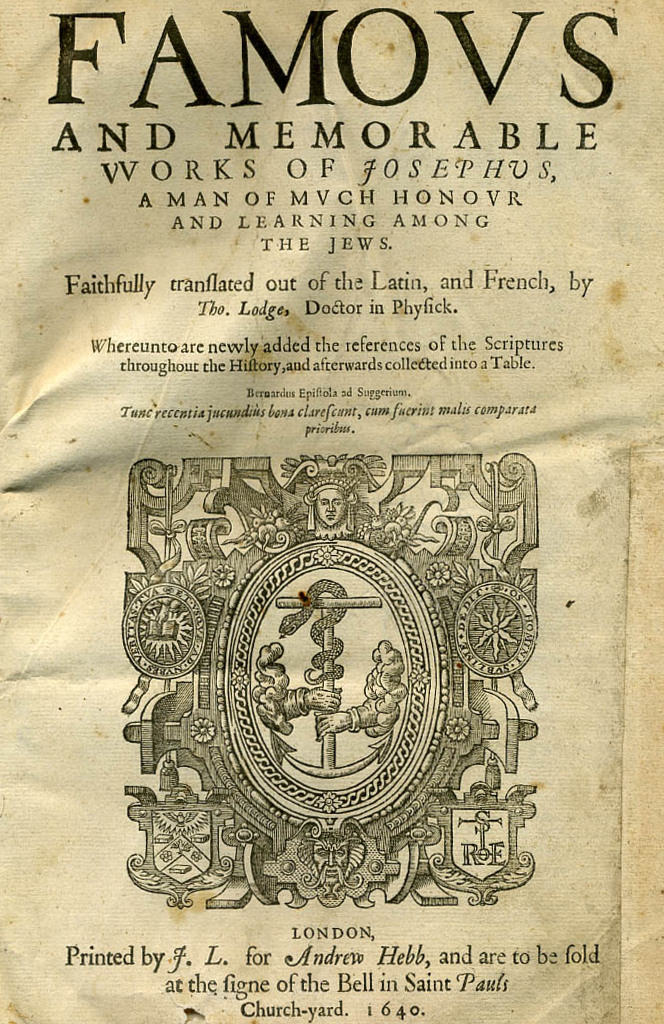
A 1640 edition of the Works of Josephus

Josephus wrote all of his surviving works after his establishment in Rome (c. AD 71) under the patronage of the Flavian Emperor Vespasian. As is common with ancient texts, however, there are no known manuscripts of Josephus's works that can be dated before the eleventh century, and the oldest which do survive were copied by Christian monks. Jews are not known to have preserved the writings of Josephus perhaps because he was considered a traitor, or because his works circulated in Greek, the use of which declined among Jews shortly after Josephus's era.

There are about 120 extant Greek manuscripts of Josephus, of which 33 predate the fourteenth century, with two thirds from the Komnenos period. The earliest surviving Greek manuscript that contains the Testimonium is the eleventh-century Ambrosianus 370 (F 128), preserved in the Biblioteca Ambrosiana in Milan, which includes almost all of the second half of the Antiquities. There are about 170 extant Latin translations of Josephus, some of which go back to the sixth century. According to Louis Feldman these have proven very useful in reconstructing the Josephus texts through comparisons with the Greek manuscripts, confirming proper names and filling in gaps. One of the reasons the works of Josephus were copied and maintained by Christians was that his writings provided a good deal of information about a number of figures mentioned in the New Testament, and the background to events such as the death of James during a gap in Roman governing authority.

=== Slavonic Josephus ===
The three references found in Book 18 and Book 20 of the Antiquities do not appear in any other versions of The Jewish War except for a Slavonic version of the Testimonium Flavianum (at times called Testimonium Slavonium) which surfaced in the west at the beginning of the twentieth century, after its discovery in Russia at the end of the nineteenth century.

Although originally hailed as authentic (notably by Robert Eisler), it is now almost universally acknowledged by scholars to have been the product of an eleventh-century creation as part of a larger ideological struggle against the Khazars. As a result, it has little place in the ongoing debate over the authenticity and nature of the references to Jesus in the Antiquities. Craig A. Evans states that although some scholars had in the past supported the Slavonic Josephus, "to my knowledge no one today believes that they contain anything of value for Jesus research".

=== Arabic and Syriac Josephus ===
In 1971, a tenth-century Arabic version of the Testimonium from the chronicle of Agapius of Hierapolis was brought to light by Shlomo Pines, who also discovered a twelfth-century Syriac version of the Testimonium in the chronicle of Michael the Syrian. These additional manuscript sources of the Testimonium have furnished additional ways to evaluate Josephus' mention of Jesus in the Antiquities, principally through a close textual comparison between the Arabic, Syriac and Greek versions to the Testimonium.

There are subtle yet key differences between the Greek manuscripts and these texts. For instance, the Arabic version does not blame the Jews for the death of Jesus. The key phrase "at the suggestion of the principal men among us" reads instead "Pilate condemned him to be crucified". Instead of "he was Christ", the Syriac version has the phrase "he was believed to be Christ". Drawing on these textual variations, scholars have suggested that these versions of the Testimonium more closely reflect what a non-Christian Jew might have written.

==== Potential dependence on Eusebius ====
In 2008, however, Alice Whealey published an article arguing that Agapius's and Michael's versions of the Testimonium are not independent witnesses to the original text of Josephus's Antiquities. Rather, they both ultimately derive from the Syriac translation of the Ecclesiastical History written by Eusebius, which in turn quotes the Testimonium. Whealey notes that Michael's Syriac Testimonium shares several peculiar choices of vocabulary with the version found in the Syriac translation of the Ecclesiastical History. These words and phrases are not shared by an independent Syriac translation of the Testimonium from Eusebius' book Theophania, strongly indicating that Agapius's text is simply a paraphrased quotation from the Syriac Ecclesiastical History, and not a direct quotation of Josephus himself. Michael's text, in contrast, she concludes is much closer to what Josephus actually wrote.

One of the key prongs in her argument is that Agapius's and Michael's Testimonia share the unique peculiarity that they both explicitly state that Jesus died after being condemned to the cross, while the Greek original does not include this detail. According to Whealey, the differences between the two Testimonia are simply due to the fact that Agapius's chronicle more freely paraphrases and abbreviates its sources, whereas Michael's version is probably a verbatim copy. The implication of this argument, if valid, is that Agapius' abbreviated Testimonium cannot be an earlier version of the passage than what we find in extant manuscripts of Josephus' Antiquities.

Whealey furthermore notices that Michael's version of the Testimonium shares common features with Jerome's Latin translation. Most importantly for her, instead of "he was the Messiah", as in the Greek Testimonium, Jerome's and Michael's versions both read, "he was thought to be the Messiah". She considers it likely, therefore, that the Latin and Arabic translations go back to an original Greek version with the same reading. Since they otherwise have no substantial disagreement from the Greek version we possess, and since that sole variant is sufficient to explain the most powerful objections to the Testimonium's integrity, she concludes that it is "the only major alteration" that has been made to what Josephus originally wrote.

== The Testimonium Flavianum ==
Testimonium Flavianum

About this time there lived Jesus, a wise man, if indeed one ought to call him a man. For he was one who performed surprising deeds and was a teacher of such people as accept the truth gladly. He won over many Jews and many of the Greeks. He was the Christ. And when, upon the accusation of the principal men among us, Pilate had condemned him to a cross, those who had first come to love him did not cease. He appeared to them spending a third day restored to life, for the prophets of God had foretold these things and a thousand other marvels about him. And the tribe of the Christians, so called after him, has still to this day not disappeared.

— Antiquities of the Jews, Book 18, Chapter 3, 3

The Testimonium Flavianum, meaning 'the testimony of Flavius Josephus', is a passage found in Book 18, Chapter 3, 3 of the Antiquities which describes the condemnation and crucifixion of Jesus at the hands of the Roman authorities. The Testimonium is probably the most discussed passage in Josephus.

Since the late 20th century, the general consensus has held that the Testimonium is partially authentic in that an authentic nucleus referencing the life of Jesus was original to Josephus. James Dunn states that there is "broad consensus" among scholars regarding the nature of an authentic original reference to Jesus in the Testimonium, as well as on what the passage would look like without the interpolations. Among other things, the existence of an original introduction to Jesus would help make sense of the later reference in Antiquities Book 20, Chapter 9, 1 where Josephus refers to the stoning of "James the brother of Jesus". Josephus had knowledge of Galilee and its inhabitants, where Jesus taught, since he wrote most of his autobiography The Life of Flavius Josephus on that region. The autobiography was an appendix to Antiquities of the Jews, where both references to Jesus are located.

=== Early references on Josephus on Jesus ===
In the 200s AD, Origen of Alexandria claimed in two works (Commentary on Matthew 10.17 and Contra Celsum 1.47) that Josephus had mentioned Jesus and complained that Josephus did not see him as the Christ:

And I think it in harmony with reason that Jesus was the first-fruit among men of the purity which consists in chastity, and Mary among women; for it were not pious to ascribe to any other than to her the first-fruit of virginity. And James is he whom Paul says in the Epistle to the Galatians that he saw, "But other of the Apostles saw I none, save James the Lord's brother." (Galatians 1:19) And to so great a reputation among the people for righteousness did this James rise, that Flavius Josephus, who wrote the Antiquities of the Jews in twenty books, when wishing to exhibit the cause why the people suffered so great misfortunes that even the temple was razed to the ground, said, that these things happened to them in accordance with the wrath of God in consequence of the things which they had dared to do against James the brother of Jesus who is called Christ. And the wonderful thing is, that, though he did not accept Jesus as Christ, he yet gave testimony that the righteousness of James was so great; and he says that the people thought that they had suffered these things because of James.

— Commentary on Matthew, Book X, Chapter 17 (246-248 AD)

In Origen's apologetic work Contra Celsum, he made a similar remark:

I would like to say to Celsus, who represents the Jew as accepting somehow John as a Baptist, who baptized Jesus, that the existence of John the Baptist, baptizing for the remission of sins, is related by one who lived no great length of time after John and Jesus. For in the 18th book of his Antiquities of the Jews, Josephus bears witness to John as having been a Baptist, and as promising purification to those who underwent the rite. Now this writer, although not believing in Jesus as the Christ, in seeking after the cause of the fall of Jerusalem and the destruction of the temple, whereas he ought to have said that the conspiracy against Jesus was the cause of these calamities befalling the people, since they put to death Christ, who was a prophet, says nevertheless — being, although against his will, not far from the truth— that these disasters happened to the Jews as a punishment for the death of James the Just, who was a brother of Jesus (called Christ), — the Jews having put him to death, although he was a man most distinguished for his justice.

— Contra Celsum, Book I, Chapter XLVII (248 AD)

The earliest quotation of the Testimonium, outside of Josephus, is found in the writings of the fourth-century Christian apologist and historian Eusebius, who used Josephus's works extensively as a source for his own Ecclesiastical History. Writing no later than 324, Eusebius quotes the passage in essentially the same form as that preserved in extant manuscripts. It has therefore been suggested by a minority of scholars that part or all of the passage may have been Eusebius's own invention, in order to provide an outside Jewish authority for the life of Christ. However, most scholars argue that the fact that Origen predates Eusebius and complains that Josephus had not recognized Jesus as the Messiah points to the fact that Origen had read the original version of the Testimonium, since such a clear statement could not have simply arisen from the "James, brother of Jesus" passage.

=== Three perspectives on authenticity ===
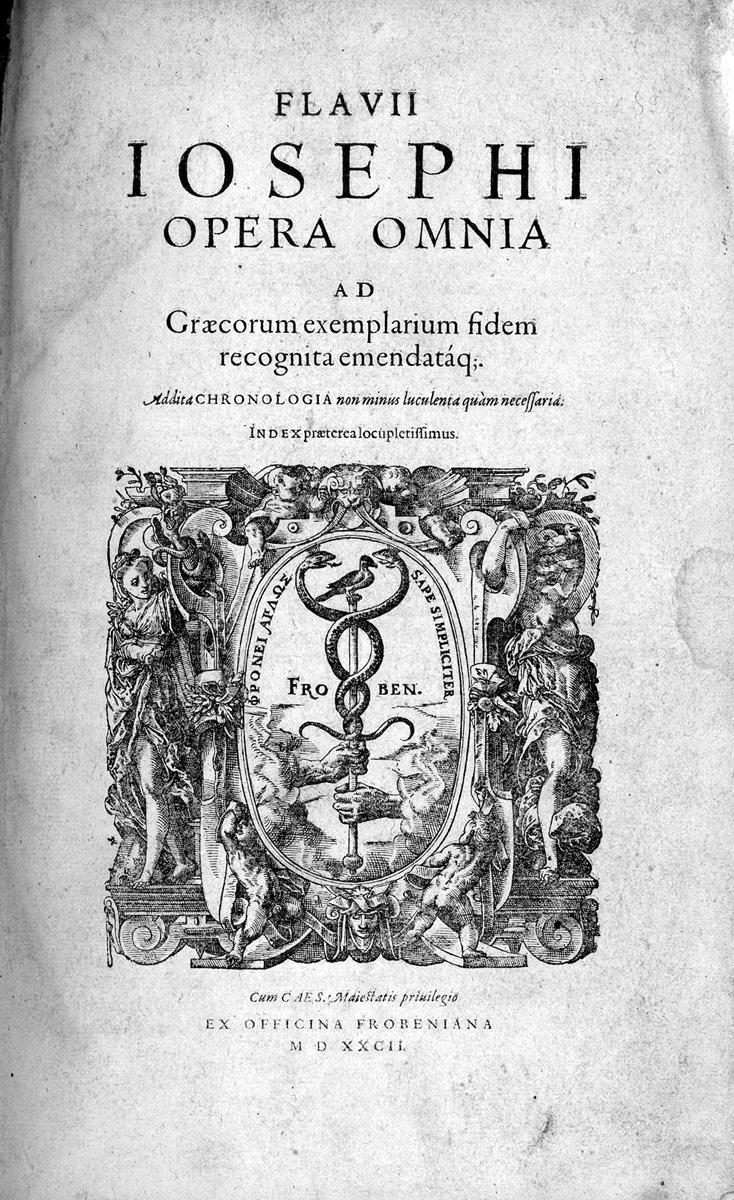
The Complete Works of Josephus, 1582

Paul L. Maier and Zvi Baras state that there are three possible perspectives on the authenticity of the Testimonium:

1. It is entirely authentic.
2. It has authentic material about Jesus, but Christian interpolations exist in some parts.
3. It is entirely a Christian forgery.

Paul Maier states that the first case is generally seen as hopeless given that as a Jew, Josephus would not have claimed Jesus as the Messiah, and that the third option is hardly tenable given the presence of the passage in all extant Greek manuscripts; thus a large majority of modern scholars accept partial authenticity. Baras adds that partial authenticity is more plausible because it accepts parts of the passage as genuine, but discounts other parts as interpolations. Craig A. Evans and Robert E. Van Voorst state that most modern scholars accept the position that the Testimonium is partially authentic, had a kernel with an authentic reference to Jesus, and that the analysis of its content and style support this conclusion.

While before the advent of literary criticism most scholars considered the Testimonium entirely authentic, thereafter the number of supporters of full authenticity declined. Most scholars now accept partial authenticity and many attempt to reconstruct their own version of the authentic kernel, and scholars such as Géza Vermes have argued that the overall characterizations of Jesus in the Testimonium are in accord with the style and approach of Josephus.

=== Arguments for complete authenticity ===
==== Pre-modern criticism ====
Until the rise of modern criticism, many scholars believed the Testimonium was nearly or completely authentic with little or no Christian interpolations. Some of these arguments relied on the language used in the Testimonium. For instance, Jesus is called "a wise man" (and Josephus described others like Solomon, Daniel, and John the Baptist in the same fashion), which would not have been a common Christian label for Christ at the time. He referred to Jesus merely as "a worker of amazing deeds" and nothing more, again disagreeing with how Christians viewed Christ. Referring to Jesus as "a teacher of people who accept the truth with pleasure", where "pleasure" (ἡδονή) connotes hedonistic value, is not in line with how Christians saw the point of Jesus' teachings. Claiming that Jesus won over "both Jews and Greeks" is a misunderstanding that a Christian scribe would not likely have made, knowing that Jesus mainly ministered to Jews. Also, the phrase "Those who had first loved him did not cease doing so" is Josephan in style, and calling Christians a "tribe" would not have made sense to a Christian writer.

==== Modern defense ====
In 2025, T. C. Schmidt defended the essential authenticity of the Testimonium, arguing that the passage only lost two or three words during its textual transmission. These are the Greek word "certain" (τις) in the opening sentence (which appears in Eusebius' quotation of Josephus in Ecclesiastical History) and the phrase "was thought to be the Christ" instead of "was the Christ", which is supported by several Latin, Syriac, Arabic, and Armenian textual witnesses. From his statistical analysis of the vocabulary and frequency of terms from all the works of Josephus and the passage, the passage is Josephan.

Schmidt argues that when adding those missing words the text of the Testimonium becomes ambiguous and can plausibly be interpreted as either a negative or neutral portrayal of Jesus, which is how most ancient Christian sources interpreted the passage. He highlights that "the TF is suffused with words, claims, and turns of phrase that were not used by ancient Christians, and that come across as written by a non-Christian." He also argues that the style and vocabulary of the passage find numerous parallels elsewhere in Josephus' works, and that other ancient Jewish and pagan writers frequently made comments about Jesus that were similar to those found in the Testimonium, supporting the authenticity of the text.

Schmidt further argues that Josephus' sources for his account of Jesus can be identified, since the Jewish historian wrote that the "first men" (πρώτων ἀνδρῶν) were "among us" (παρ’ ἡμῖν), a phrase which Josephus always uses to refer to someone with whom he was personally acquainted. Josephus writes several times elsewhere that he was closely familiar with the "first men" (πρῶτοι) of Jerusalem beginning in the early 50s AD. Since he also knew some chief priests in Jerusalem and at least one leading member of the Sanhedrin at that time, Schmidt suggests that Josephus probably knew some of the "first men among us" who accused Jesus a few decades before.

==== Paraphrase model ====
The paraphrase model, advanced by G. J. Goldberg in 2022, is based on the observation that Josephus wrote most of the Jewish Antiquities by paraphrasing Greek and Hebrew sources. Goldberg proposes that the Jesus passage in the Antiquities is also a paraphrase in the same manner. Josephus's methods of revising his sources have been well established and can be used to objectively test whether a proposed candidate source could have been adapted in the same way for the Jesus passage. In a phrase-by-phrase study, Goldberg finds that the Jesus account can be derived from Luke's Emmaus narrative using transformations Josephus is demonstrated to have employed in paraphrasing known sources for the Antiquities. He finds these paraphrase precedents in word adoption, word and phrase substitution, content order preservation and content modification. As these stylistic pairings are unlike the relationships found among any other ancient Jesus texts, Goldberg proposes the most plausible explanation of these findings is that the Jesus passage in the Antiquities is indeed Josephus's paraphrase of a Christian text very much like, if not identical to, Luke's Emmaus narrative (Luke 24:18–24).

This paraphrase model, Goldberg argues, is not only a natural application of Josephus's writing processes but also resolves the questions that researchers have raised about the passage, shedding light on the origin of specific difficult phrases and accounting for its brevity and its mixture of Josephan language with a Christian credal structure. While many had previously suspected that an original Josephus passage had been edited by a later Christian to give the credal appearance, the paraphrase model argues such edits cannot explain the end-to-end consistency of a paraphrase relationship with the Emmaus text. The more plausible explanation is rather the reverse: an original Christian document was edited by Josephus by applying his usual revision method for the Antiquities.

The historical implications of the model, Goldberg argues, include the following. First, it shows Jesus was a historical figure and not a myth, based on the reasoning that Josephus's treatment of his source indicates he thought it reliable; it must have conformed with what he knew of events under Pilate. The model also provides unique evidence about the dating of at least one passage of Luke's Gospel. And as the paraphrase shows Josephus had obtained a Christian source and treated it with a degree of respect, it provides an unexpected window into a cordial relationship between Christians and Jews in Rome at the end of the first century.

=== Arguments for presence of Christian interpolations ===
The Testimonium has been the subject of a great deal of research and debate among scholars, being one of the most discussed passages among all antiquities. Louis Feldman has stated that in the period from 1937 to 1980 at least 87 articles had appeared on the topic, the overwhelming majority of which questioned the total or partial authenticity of the Testimonium. While early scholars considered the Testimonium to be a total forgery, the majority of modern scholars consider it partially authentic, despite some clear Christian interpolations in the text.

The arguments surrounding the authenticity of the Testimonium fall into two categories: internal arguments that rely on textual analysis and compare the passage with the rest of Josephus' work; and external arguments, that consider the wider cultural and historical context. Some of the external arguments are "arguments from silence" that question the authenticity of the entire passage not for what it says, but due to lack of references to it among other ancient sources.

The external analyses of the Testimonium have even used computer-based methods, e.g. the matching of the text of the Testimonium with the Gospel of Luke performed by Gary Goldberg in 1995. Goldberg found some partial matches between the Testimonium and Luke 24:19–21, 26–27 stating "the Emmaus narrative more closely resembles the Testimonium in its phrase-by-phrase outline of content and order than any other known text of comparable age." Goldberg's analyses suggested three possibilities: that the matches were random, that the Testimonium was a Christian interpolation based on Luke, or that both the Testimonium and Luke were based on the same sources. In a later work, published in 2022, Goldberg investigated Josephus's paraphrase style and concluded only the last of these possibilities could explain why the Emmaus-Testimonium language relationships were end-to-end consistent with Josephus's methods of revision.

=== Internal arguments ===
An 1879 copy of the Antiquities

==== Christian phraseology ====
One of the key internal arguments against the complete authenticity of the Testimonium is that the clear inclusion of Christian phraseology strongly indicates the presence of some interpolations. For instance, the phrases "if it be lawful to call him a man" suggests that Jesus was more than human and is likely a Christian interpolation. Some scholars have attempted to reconstruct the original Testimonium, but others contend that attempts to discriminate the passage into Josephan and non-Josephan elements are inherently circular.

==== Eusebian phraseology ====
Another example of the textual arguments against the Testimonium is that it uses the Greek term poietes to mean "doer" (as part of the phrase "doer of wonderful works"), but elsewhere in his works Josephus only uses the term poietes to mean "poet", whereas this use of poietes seems consistent with the Greek of Eusebius.

=== External arguments ===
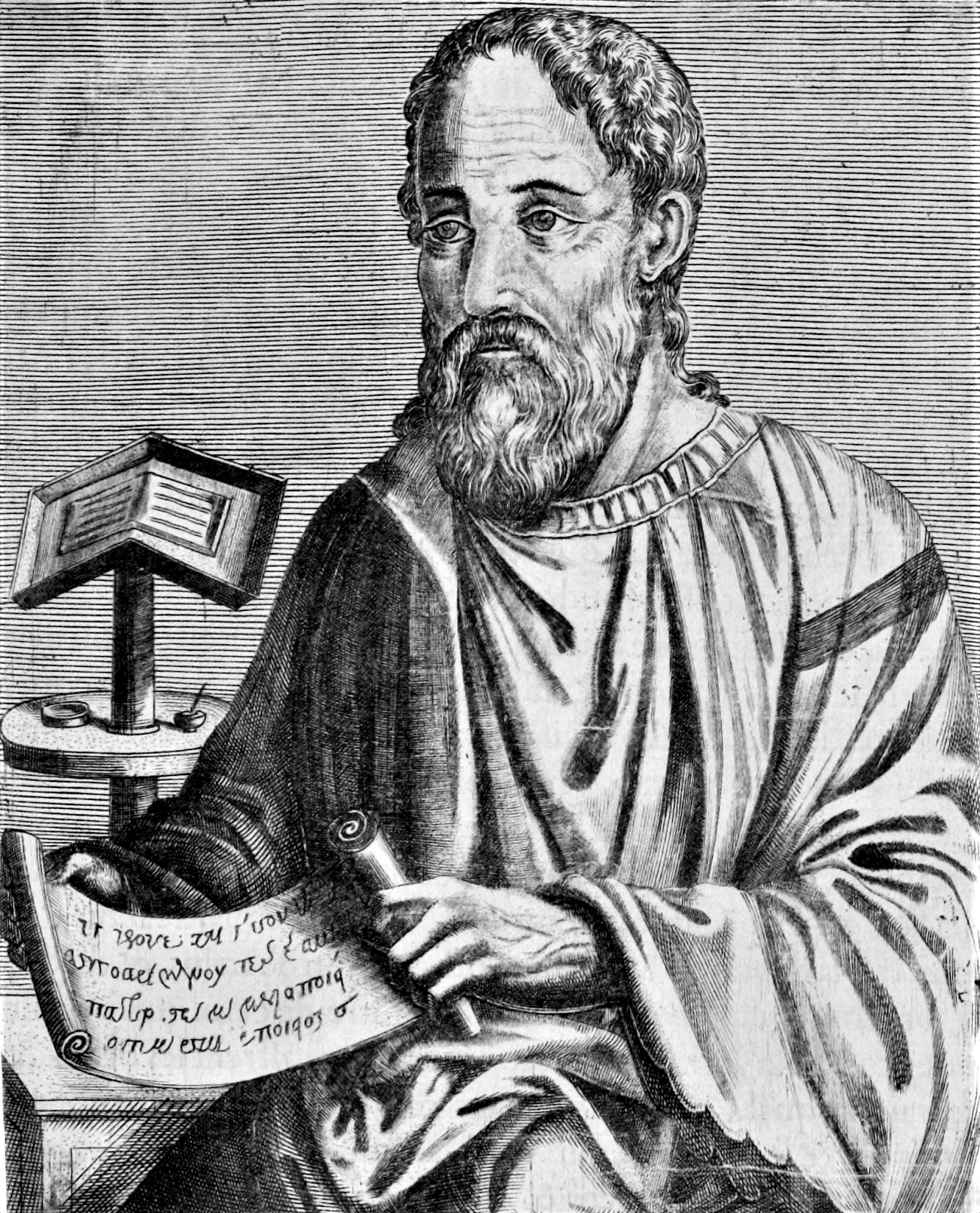
Eusebius

==== Origen's references to Josephus ====
In two works (Commentary on Matthew 10.17 and Contra Celsum 1.47; see § Early references on Josephus and Jesus) Origen had actually complained that Josephus had mentioned Jesus but did not see him as the Christ. According to Wataru Mizugaki, the Testimonium passage that Origen had seen in the third century was likely to have been neutral or skeptical on Jesus without Christian interpolation and this may have looked unsatisfactory to a Christian editor. Origen's statement in his Commentary on Matthew (Book X, Chapter 17) that Josephus "did not accept Jesus as Christ", is usually seen as a confirmation of the generally accepted fact that Josephus did not believe Jesus to be the Messiah. This forms a key external argument against the total authenticity of the Testimonium in that Josephus, as a Jew, would not have claimed Jesus as the Messiah, and the reference to "he was the Christ" in the Testimonium must be a Christian interpolation. Based on this observation alone, Paul L. Maier calls the case for the total authenticity of the Testimonium "hopeless". The majority of scholars hold that Josephus wrote an authentic kernel, at least on Jesus.

=== Arguments from silence ===
A different set of external arguments against the authenticity of the Testimonium (either partial or total) are arguments from silence, e.g. that although twelve Christian authors refer to Josephus before Eusebius in AD 324, none mentions the Testimonium.

Even after Eusebius' AD 324 reference, it is not until Jerome's De Viris Illustribus (c. AD 392) that the passage from Josephus is referenced again, even though the Testimonium's reference to Jesus would seem appropriate in the works of many intervening patristic authors. However, Bart D. Ehrman and John P. Meier have argued that this silence is mainly due to the fact that the original Testimonium probably had a neutral tone toward Jesus and did not contain elements that would have been useful to Christian apologetics, since it did not recognize him as the Messiah, nor did it speak about his resurrection; it was, therefore, not a useful instrument in their polemics with pagan writers.

Some scholars also point to the silence of Photios as late as the ninth century, and the fact that he does not mention the Testimonium at all in his broad review of Josephus. However, Photios argues in his Bibliotheca that Josephus's works mention the Massacre of the Innocents and the virgin birth of Jesus (which no works of Josephus make any reference to), leading many scholars to think that he actually had a scant knowledge of the writings he was reviewing or that the documents he was working on were grossly interpolated. Also, Photios had clearly read Eusebius's Ecclesiastical History and Jerome's De Viris Illustribus, since he lists them both in his Bibliotheca.

==== Table of Josephus excludes the Testimonium ====
A separate argument from silence against the total or partial authenticity of the Testimonium is that a fifth- or sixth-century table of contents of Josephus (albeit selective) makes no mention of it.

==== Arabic Testimonium lacks Christian terminology ====
Andreas J. Köstenberger argues that the fact that the tenth-century Arabic version of the Testimonium (discovered in the 1970s) lacks distinct Christian terminology while sharing the essential elements of the passage indicates that the Greek Testimonium has been subject to interpolation.

==== No parallel in other works ====
A final argument from silence relates to Josephus's own writings and questions the authenticity of Testimonium based on the fact that it has no parallel in the Jewish War, which includes a discussion of Pontius Pilate at about the same level of detail.

==== Timing of the interpolations ====
Zvi Baras believes that the Testimonium was subject to interpolation before Eusebius wrote. Baras believes that Origen had seen the original Testimonium but that the Testimonium seen by Origen had no negative reference to Jesus, else Origen would have reacted against it. Baras states that the interpolation in the Testimonium took place between Origen and Eusebius.

Paul L. Maier states that a comparison of Eusebius's reference with the tenth-century Arabic version of the Testimonium due to Agapius of Hierapolis indicates that the Christian interpolation present in the Testimonium must have come early, before Eusebius. Robert E. Van Voorst also states that the interpolation likely took place some time between Origen and Eusebius.

=== Arguments for partial authenticity ===
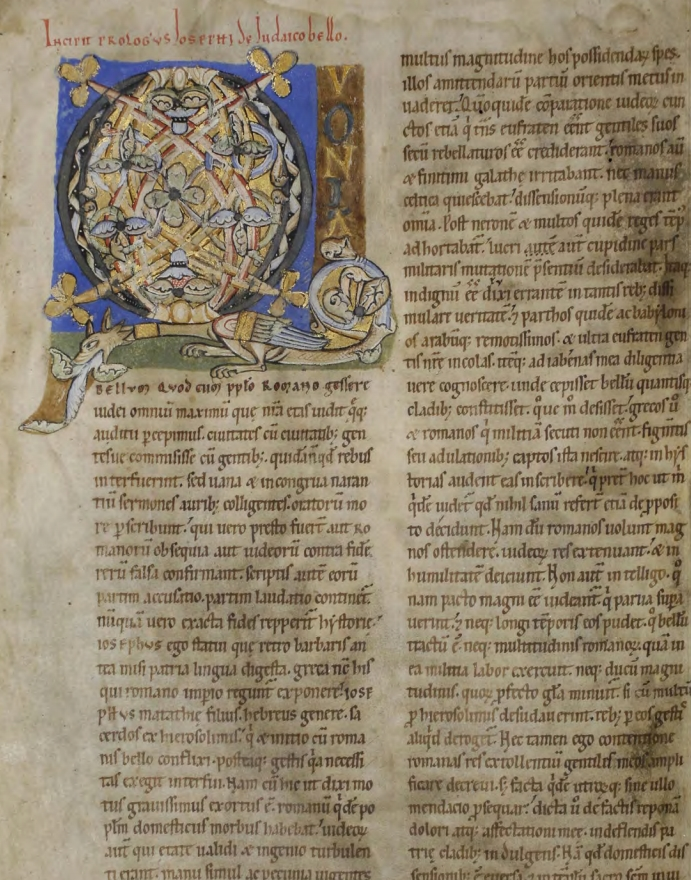
A copy of Josephus' Antiquities c. 1200

==== Lack of Jewish deicide ====
Craig A. Evans states that an argument in favor of the partial authenticity of the Testimonium is that the passage does not stress the role played by the Jewish leaders in the death of Jesus. According to Evans, if the passage had been an interpolation after the emergence of conflicts between Jews and Christians, it would have had a more accusatory tone, but in its current form reads as one would expect it to read for a passage composed by Josephus towards the end of the first century. Géza Vermes concurs, arguing that if the Testimonium had been the work of a Christian forger, it would have placed blame on the Jewish leaders, but as is it is "perfectly in line" with the attitude of Josephus towards Pilate. Vermes also states that the detached depiction of the followers of Jesus is not the work of a Christian interpolator. Vermes calls the Jesus notice in the Testimonium a "veritable tour de force" in which Josephus plays the role of a neutral witness.

==== Josephan vocabulary and style ====
Andreas J. Köstenberger argues that the Testimonium includes vocabulary that is typically Josephan, and the style is consistent with that of Josephus. Köstenberger (and separately Van Voorst) state that the Josephus' reference to the large number of followers of Jesus during his public ministry is unlikely to have been due to a Christian scribe familiar with the New Testament accounts, and is hence unlikely to be an interpolation.

==== Josephan beliefs about Jesus ====
Claudia Setzer holds that while "tribe is an odd way to describe Christians", it does not necessarily have negative connotations. Setzer argues for the existence of an authentic kernel because "the style and vocabulary are Josephan" and specific parts (e.g. the use of "wise man") are not what one would expect from a Christian forger. Setzer argues that the Testimonium indicates that Josephus had heard of Jesus and the basic elements surrounding his death, and that he saw Jesus as primarily a miracle worker. Van Voorst also states that calling Christians a "tribe" would have been very out of character for a Christian scribe, while Josephus has used it to refer both to Jewish and Christian groups.

=== Arguments from external attestation ===
==== Origen's complaint about Josephus referencing Jesus ====
Lester L. Grabbe notes that in two works (Commentary on Matthew 10.17 and Contra Celsum 1.47; see § Early references on Josephus and Jesus) Origen had actually complained that Josephus had mentioned Jesus, while not recognizing Jesus as the messiah, and this provided an early independent support of the partial Testimonium in a more neutral form. Zvi Baras argues from this that Origen had seen a version of the Testimonium that included no interpolations. Baras asserts that a Testimonium seen by Origen must have had a neutral tone, and included no derogatory references towards Christians, and hence required no reaction from Origen. He claims that the neutral tone of the Testimonium was then modified between the time of Origen and Eusebius. John P. Meier similarly argues that the fact that Origen complains that Josephus had not recognized Jesus as the Messiah points to the fact that Origen had read the original version of the Testimonium, since such a clear statement could not have simply arisen from the "James, brother of Jesus" passage.

==== Arabic Testimonium as the more authentic version ====
Andreas J. Köstenberger argues that a comparison of the Greek manuscripts with the Arabic quotation discovered by Shlomo Pines in the 1970s provides an indication of the original Josephan text. Köstenberger states that many modern scholars believe that the Arabic version reflects the state of Josephus' original text before it was subject to Christian interpolation. This version reads as follows:

At this time there was a wise man who was called Jesus. And his conduct was good, and [he] was known to be virtuous. And many people from among the Jews and the other nations became his disciples. Pilate condemned him to be crucified and to die. And those who had become his disciples did not abandon his discipleship. They reported that he had appeared to them three days after his crucifixion and that he was alive; accordingly he was perhaps the Messiah concerning whom the prophets have recounted wonders.

=== Other arguments ===
==== Comparison to Philo's works ====
Steve Mason has argued for partial authenticity for the Testimonium, because no other parts of any of the works of Josephus have been contested to have had scribal tempering, Christian copyists were usually conservative when transmitting texts in general, and seeing that the works of Philo were unaltered by Christian scribes through the centuries strongly support that it is very unlikely that the passage was invented out of thin air by a Christian scribe. Philo often wrote in a way that was favorable to Christian ideas and yet no Christian scribes took advantage of that to insert Jesus or Christian beliefs into Philo's text.

==== Authenticity of the James passage ====
Bruce Chilton and Craig A. Evans state that the general acceptance of the authenticity of the James passage lends support to the partial authenticity of the Testimonium in that the brief reference to "Jesus, who was called Christ" in Antiquities XX, 9, 1 "clearly implies a prior reference" and that "in all probability the Testimonium is that prior reference". Paul L. Maier concurs with the analysis of Chilton and Evans and states that Josephus' first reference was the Testimonium. Géza Vermes also considers the "who was called Christ" reference in the James passage as the second reference to Jesus in the Antiquities and states that the first reference is likely to be the Testimonium.

=== Reconstruction of an authentic kernel ===
The Works of Josephus, 1879

Robert E. Van Voorst states that most modern scholars believe that the Testimonium is partially authentic, and has a reference to Jesus. However, he states that scholars are divided on the tone of the original reference and while some scholars believe that it had a negative tone which was softened by Christian interpolators, others believe that it had a neutral tone, in keeping with the style and approach of Josephus regarding the issue. According to Van Voorst, scholars who support the negative reconstruction contend that the reference read something like "source of further trouble in Jesus a wise man" and that it stated "he was the so-called Christ". Van Voorst states that most scholars support a neutral reconstruction which states "Around this time lived Jesus, a wise man" and includes no reference to "he was the Christ". Van Voorst states that if the original references to Jesus had had a negative tone, the Christian scribes would have likely deleted it entirely. Van Voorst also states that the neutral reconstruction fits better with the Arabic Testimonium discovered by Pines in the 1970s. Van Voorst states that the neutral reconstruction is supported by the majority of scholars because it involves far less conjectural wording and fits better with the style of Josephus.

==== Exclusion of three divisive elements ====
Craig Blomberg states that if the three elements "lawful to call him a man", "he was the Christ" and the reference to the resurrection are removed from the Testimonium the rest of the passage flows smoothly within the context, fits the style of Josephus and is likely to be authentic. Blomberg adds that after the removal of these three elements (which are likely interpolations) from the Greek versions the remaining passage fits well with the Arabic version and supports the authenticity of the reference to the execution of Jesus by Pilate. Joel B. Green also states that the removal of some elements from the Testimonium produces a passage that is likely to be an authentic reference to the death of Jesus.

In the estimation of James Dunn, there is "broad consensus" among scholars regarding what the Testimonium would look like without the interpolations. According to Dunn's reconstruction, the original passage likely read:

Now there was about this time Jesus, a wise man. For he was a doer of startling deeds, a teacher of such men as receive the truth with pleasure. And he gained a following both among many Jews and many of Greek origin. And when Pilate, at the suggestion of the principal men amongst us, condemned him to the cross, those that loved him at the first did not forsake him. And the tribe of Christians, so named from him, are not extinct at this day.

In this passage, which is based on John P. Meier's reconstruction, Jesus is called a "wise man", but "lawful to call him a man" and "he was the Christ" are removed, as is the reference to the resurrection. According to Bart D. Ehrman, Meier's reconstruction is currently the most accepted among scholars.

Géza Vermes has performed a detailed analysis of the Testimonium and modified it to remove what he considers the interpolations. In Vermes' reconstruction "there was Jesus, a wise man" is retained, but the reference to "he was the Christ" is changed to "he was called the Christ" and the resurrection reference is omitted. Vermes states that the Testimonium provides Josephus' authentic portrayal of Jesus, depicting him as a wise teacher and miracle worker with an enthusiastic group of followers who remained faithful to him after his crucifixion by Pilate, up to the time of Josephus. Vermes's version reads:

Now there was about this time Jesus, a wise man. For he was a doer of startling deeds, a teacher of such men as receive the truth with pleasure. And he gained a following both among many Jews and many of Greek origin. He was called the Christ. And when Pilate, at the suggestion of the principal men amongst us, condemned him to the cross, those that loved him at the first did not forsake him. And the tribe of Christians, so named from him, are not extinct at this day.

=== Arguments for complete forgery ===
==== Textual similarities to Eusebian works ====
In addition to the arguments listed above, a minority of scholars have put forward arguments to the effect that the entire Testimonium is a Christian interpolation. For example, Kenneth Olson has argued that the entire Testimonium must have been forged by Eusebius himself, basing his argument on textual similarities between the Testimonium and Eusebius' writings in the Demonstrations of the Gospels.

Sabrina Inowlocki argues that it is unlikely that Eusebius forged the Testimonium, as that would have been contrary to his methodology and purposes.

==== Three Eusebian phrases ====
In 2012, Josephus scholar Louis Feldman reversed his prior support for the partial authenticity of the Testimonium, proposing that the passage was interpolated in its entirety by Eusebius. In support of this view, Feldman points out, following Olson, that the Testimonium features three phrases ("one who wrought surprising feats", "the tribe of the Christians", and "still to this day") which are used nowhere else in the whole of Greek literature except Eusebius. Feldman's new theory was criticized by James Carleton Paget, who accused Feldman of misreading the data and of using anachronistic criteria.

Both Carleton Paget and Alice Whealey had already responded to Olson's argument, rejecting its arguments and conclusion. In his 2000 book Van Voorst had also argued that the word "tribe" is actually used by Josephus to describe other Jewish groups.

==== Fourth-century Christian credal statements ====
In 2014, Paul J. Hopper wrote a book chapter in which he argued that the style and narrative structure of the Testimonium is sharply in contrast with the rest of Josephus' work. According to Hopper, the language of the Testimonium has more in common with fourth-century Christian credal statements than the historiographical work of first-century authors, including Josephus. He concluded that the most likely explanation is that the passage was simply interpolated in its entirety by a Christian scribe.

The concordance of the language used in the Testimonium, its flow within the text, and its length have formed components of the internal arguments against its authenticity, e.g. that the brief and compact character of the Testimonium stands in marked contrast to Josephus' more extensive accounts presented elsewhere in his works. For example, Josephus' description of the death of John the Baptist includes consideration of his virtues, the theology associated with his baptismal practices, his oratorical skills, his influence, the circumstances of his death, and the belief that the destruction of Herod's army was a divine punishment for Herod's slaughter of John. G. A. Wells has argued against the authenticity of the Testimonium, stating that the passage is noticeably shorter and more cursory than such notices generally used by Josephus in the Antiquities, and that had it been authentic, it would have included more details and a longer introduction.

==== Intrusion that breaks the narrative ====
A further internal argument against the Testimonium's authenticity is the context of the passage in the Antiquities of the Jews. Some scholars argue that the passage is an intrusion into the progression of Josephus' text at the point in which it appears in the Antiquities and breaks the thread of the narrative.

== "James, the brother of Jesus" passage ==
Josephus's reference to James the brother of Jesus

And now Caesar, upon hearing the death of Festus, sent Albinus into Judea, as procurator. But the king deprived Joseph of the high priesthood, and bestowed the succession to that dignity on the son of Ananus, who was also himself called Ananus. Now the report goes that this eldest Ananus proved a most fortunate man; for he had five sons who had all performed the office of a high priest to God, and who had himself enjoyed that dignity a long time formerly, which had never happened to any other of our high priests. But this younger Ananus, who, as we have told you already, took the high priesthood, was a bold man in his temper, and very insolent; he was also of the sect of the Sadducees, who are very rigid in judging offenders, above all the rest of the Jews, as we have already observed; when, therefore, Ananus was of this disposition, he thought he had now a proper opportunity. Festus was now dead, and Albinus was but upon the road; so he assembled the sanhedrin of judges, and brought before them the brother of Jesus, who was called Christ, whose name was James, and some others; and when he had formed an accusation against them as breakers of the law, he delivered them to be stoned: but as for those who seemed the most equitable of the citizens, and such as were the most uneasy at the breach of the laws, they disliked what was done; they also sent to the king, desiring him to send to Ananus that he should act so no more, for that what he had already done was not to be justified; nay, some of them went also to meet Albinus, as he was upon his journey from Alexandria, and informed him that it was not lawful for Ananus to assemble a sanhedrin without his consent. Whereupon Albinus complied with what they said, and wrote in anger to Ananus, and threatened that he would bring him to punishment for what he had done; on which king Agrippa took the high priesthood from him, when he had ruled but three months, and made Jesus, the son of Damneus, high priest.

— Flavius Josephus: Antiquities of the Jews Book 20, Chapter 9, 1 For Greek text see

In Antiquities (Book 20, Chapter 9, 1) Josephus refers to the stoning of "James the brother of Jesus" (James the Just) by order of Ananus ben Ananus, a Herodian-era High Priest. The James referred to in this passage is most likely the James to whom the Epistle of James has been attributed. The translations of Josephus' writing into other languages have at times included passages that are not found in the Greek texts, raising the possibility of interpolation, but this passage on James is found in all manuscripts, including the Greek texts.

The context of the passage is the period following the death of Porcius Festus, and the journey to Alexandria by Lucceius Albinus, the new Roman Procurator of Judea, who held that position from AD 62 to 64. Because Albinus's journey to Alexandria had to have concluded no later than the summer of AD 62, the date of James' death can be assigned with some certainty to around that year. The second-century chronicler Hegesippus also left an account of the death of James, and while the details he provides diverge from those of Josephus, the two accounts share similar elements.

Modern scholarship has almost universally acknowledged the authenticity of the reference to "the brother of Jesus, who was called Christ, whose name was James" (τὸν ἀδελφὸν Ἰησοῦ τοῦ λεγομένου Χριστοῦ, Ἰάκωβος ὄνομα αὐτῷ) and has rejected its being the result of later Christian interpolation. Moreover, in comparison with Hegesippus' account of James's death, most scholars consider Josephus's to be the more historically reliable. However, a few scholars question the authenticity of the reference, based on various arguments, but primarily based on the observation that various details in The Jewish War differ from it.

=== Early references to the passage ===
==== Origen of Alexandria ====
In the third century, Origen of Alexandria claimed in two works that Josephus had mentioned James, the brother of Jesus. In Origen's commentary on Matthew, he writes:

And to so great a reputation among the people for righteousness did this James rise, that Flavius Josephus, who wrote the "Antiquities of the Jews" in twenty books, when wishing to exhibit the cause why the people suffered so great misfortunes that even the temple was razed to the ground, said, that these things happened to them in accordance with the wrath of God in consequence of the things which they had dared to do against James the brother of Jesus who is called Christ. And the wonderful thing is, that, though he did not accept Jesus as Christ, he yet gave testimony that the righteousness of James was so great; and he says that the people thought that they had suffered these things because of James.

— Commentary on Matthew, Book X, Chapter 17 (emphasis added)

In Origen's apologetic work Contra Celsum, he made a similar remark:

Now this writer [Josephus], although not believing in Jesus as the Christ, in seeking after the cause of the fall of Jerusalem and the destruction of the temple, whereas he ought to have said that the conspiracy against Jesus was the cause of these calamities befalling the people, since they put to death Christ, who was a prophet, says nevertheless—being, although against his will, not far from the truth—that these disasters happened to the Jews as a punishment for the death of James the Just, who was a brother of Jesus (called Christ),—the Jews having put him to death, although he was a man most distinguished for his justice.

— Contra Celsum, Book I, Chapter XLVII (emphasis added)

Many commentators have concluded that Origen is making reference to the "James, the brother of Jesus" passage found in Antiquities, Book 20 here, but there are some problems with this view. Origen is attributing statements to Josephus that he never wrote in any of his extant works (such as the claim that the killing of James caused the destruction of the Jerusalem temple), suggesting that he is at least partially confused.

==== Eusebius of Caesarea ====
In Book II, Chapter 23.20 of his Ecclesiastical History, Eusebius mentions Josephus' reference to the death of James. Eusebius attributes the following quote to Josephus: "These things happened to the Jews to avenge James the Just, who was a brother of Jesus, that is called the Christ. For the Jews slew him, although he was a most just man." However, this statement does not appear in the extant manuscripts of Josephus. Moreover, in Book III, chapter 11, Eusebius states that the conquest of Jerusalem immediately followed the martyrdom of James setting the martyrdom at c. AD 70 rather than the c. AD 62 given by Josephus.

=== Arguments for authenticity ===
Louis Feldman states that the authenticity of the Josephus passage on James has been "almost universally acknowledged". Feldman states that this passage, above others, indicates that Josephus did say something about Jesus. Feldman states that it would make no sense for Origen to show amazement that Josephus did not acknowledge Jesus as Christ (Book X, Chapter 17), if Josephus had not referred to Jesus at all. Paul L. Maier states that most scholars agree with Feldman's assessment that "few have doubted the genuineness of this passage" Zvi Baras also states that most modern scholars consider the James passage to be authentic.

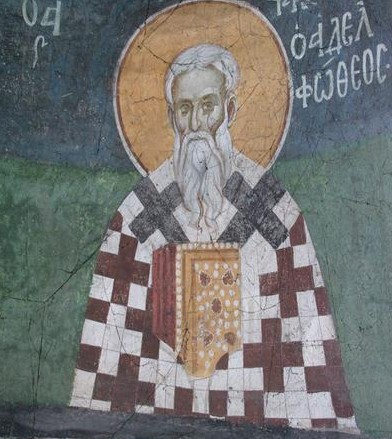
A thirteenth-century icon of James, Serbian monastery Gračanica, Kosovo

According to Robert E. Van Voorst the overwhelming majority of scholars consider both the reference to "the brother of Jesus called Christ" and the entire passage that includes it as authentic. Van Voorst states that the James passage fits well in the context in the Antiquities and an indication for its authenticity is the lack of the laudatory language that a Christian interpolator would have used to refer to Jesus as "the Lord", or a similar term. Van Voorst also states that the use of a neutral term "called Christ" which neither denies nor affirms Jesus as the Messiah points to authenticity, and indicates that Josephus used it to distinguish Jesus from the many other people called Jesus at the time, in the same way that James is distinguished, given that it was also a common name.

Richard Bauckham states that although a few scholars have questioned the James passage, "the vast majority have considered it to be authentic", and that among the several accounts of the death of James the account in Josephus is generally considered to be historically the most reliable. Bauckham states that the method of killing James by stoning, and the description provided by Josephus via the assembly of the Sanhedrin of judges are consistent with the policies of the Temple authorities towards the early Christian Church at the time.

Andreas Köstenberger considers the James passage to be authentic and states that the James passage attests to the existence of Jesus as a historical person, and that his followers considered him the Messiah. Köstenberger states that the statement by Josephus that some people recognized Jesus as the Messiah is consistent with the grammar of Josephus elsewhere but does not imply that Josephus himself considered Jesus the Messiah. Köstenberger concurs with John Meier that it is highly unlikely for the passage to be a Christian interpolation given that in New Testament texts James is referred to as the "brother of the Lord" rather than the "brother of Jesus", and that a Christian interpolator would have provided a more detailed account at that point.

Claudia Setzer states that few have questioned the authenticity of the James passage, partly based on the observation that a Christian interpolator would have provided more praise for James. Setzer states that the passage indicates that Josephus, a Jewish historian writing towards the end of the first century, could use a neutral tone towards Christians, with some tones of sympathy, implying that they may be worthy of Roman protection.

John Painter states that nothing in the James passage looks suspiciously like a Christian interpolation and that the account can be accepted as historical. Painter discusses the role of Ananus and the background to the passage, and states that after being deposed as High Priest for killing James and being replaced by Jesus the son of Damnaeus, Ananus had maintained his influence within Jerusalem through bribery. Painter points out that as described in the Antiquities of the Jews (Book 20, Chapter 9, 2) Ananus was bribing both Albinus and Jesus the son of Damnaeus so that his men could take the tithes of other priests outside Jerusalem, to the point that some priests then starved to death. Philip Carrington states that there is no reason to question the authenticity of the Josephus passage on James, and elaborates the background by stating that Ananus continued to remain a power within the Jewish circles at the time even after being deposed, and that it is likely that the charges brought against James by Ananus were not only because of his Christian association but because he objected to the oppressive policies against the poor; hence explaining the later indignation of the more moderate Jewish leaders.

=== Arguments against authenticity ===
An 1842 copy of Eusebius' Ecclesiastical History

A comparative argument made against the authenticity of the James passage by scholars such as Tessa Rajak is that the passage has a negative tone regarding the High Priest Ananus, presenting him as impulsive while in the Jewish Wars Josephus presents a positive view of Ananus and portrays him as prudent.

A textual argument against the authenticity of the James passage is that the use of the term "Christos" there seems unusual for Josephus. An argument based on the flow of the text in the document is that given that the mention of Jesus appears in the Antiquities before that of John the Baptist, a Christian interpolator may have inserted it to place Jesus in the text before John. A further argument against the authenticity of the James passage is that it would have read well even without a reference to Jesus.

=== Differences with Christian sources ===
Josephus's account places the date of the death of James as AD 62. This date is supported by Jerome's 'seventh year of the Emperor Nero', although Jerome may simply be drawing this from Josephus. However, James's successor as leader of the Jerusalem church, Simeon, is not, in tradition, appointed till after the siege of Jerusalem in AD 70, and Eusebius's notice of Simeon implies a date for the death of James immediately before the siege, i.e. about AD 69. The method of death of James is not mentioned in the New Testament. However, the account of Josephus differs from that of later works by Hegesippus, Clement of Alexandria, and Origen, and Eusebius of Caesarea in that it simply has James stoned while the others have other variations such as having James thrown from the top of the Temple, stoned, and finally beaten to death by a fuller as well as his death occurring during the siege of Jerusalem in AD 69.

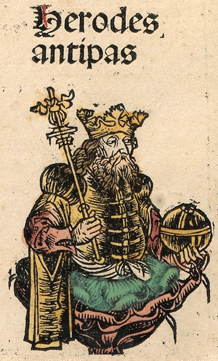
Herod Antipas from the Nuremberg Chronicle, 1493

John Painter states that the relationship of the death of James to the siege is an important theologoumenon in the early church. On the basis of the Gospel accounts it was concluded that the fate of the city was determined by the death there of Jesus. To account for the 35-year difference, Painter states that the city was preserved temporarily by the presence within it of a 'just man' (see also Sodom); who was identified with James, as confirmed by Origen. Hence Painter states that the killing of James restarted the clock that led to the destruction of the city and that the traditional dating of AD 69 simply arose from an overly literal application of the theologoumenon, and is not to be regarded as founded on a historical source.

The difference between Josephus and the Christian accounts of the death of James is seen as an indication that the Josephus passage is not a Christian interpolation by scholars such as Eddy, Boyd, and Köstenberger. Géza Vermes states that compared to the Christian accounts: "the sober picture of Josephus appears all the more believable". G. A. Wells, on the other hand, has stated that in view of Origen's statements these variations from the Christian accounts may be signs of interpolation in the James passage.

== John the Baptist passage ==
Josephus' reference to John the Baptist

Now some of the Jews thought that the destruction of Herod's army came from God, and that very justly, as a punishment of what he did against John, that was called the Baptist: for Herod slew him, who was a good man... Herod, who feared lest the great influence John had over the people might put it into his power and inclination to raise a rebellion... Accordingly, he was sent a prisoner, out of Herod's suspicious temper, to Macherus, the castle I before mentioned, and was there put to death.

In the Antiquities (Book 18, Chapter 5, 2) Josephus refers to the imprisonment and death of John the Baptist by order of Herod Antipas, the ruler of Galilee and Perea. The context of this reference is the AD 36 defeat of Herod Antipas in his conflict with Aretas IV of Nabatea, which the Jews of the time attributed to misfortune brought about by Herod's unjust execution of John.

Almost all modern scholars consider this passage to be authentic in its entirety, although a small number of authors have questioned it. Because the death of John also appears prominently in the Christian gospels, this passage is considered an important connection between the events Josephus recorded, the chronology of the gospels and the dates for the ministry of Jesus. A few scholars have questioned the passage, contending that the absence of Christian tampering or interpolation does not itself prove authenticity. While this passage is the only reference to John the Baptist outside the New Testament, it is widely seen by most scholars as confirming the historicity of the baptisms that John performed. According to Marsh, any contrast between Josephus and the Gospel's accounts of John would be because the former lacked interest in the messianic element of John's mission.

=== Arguments for authenticity ===
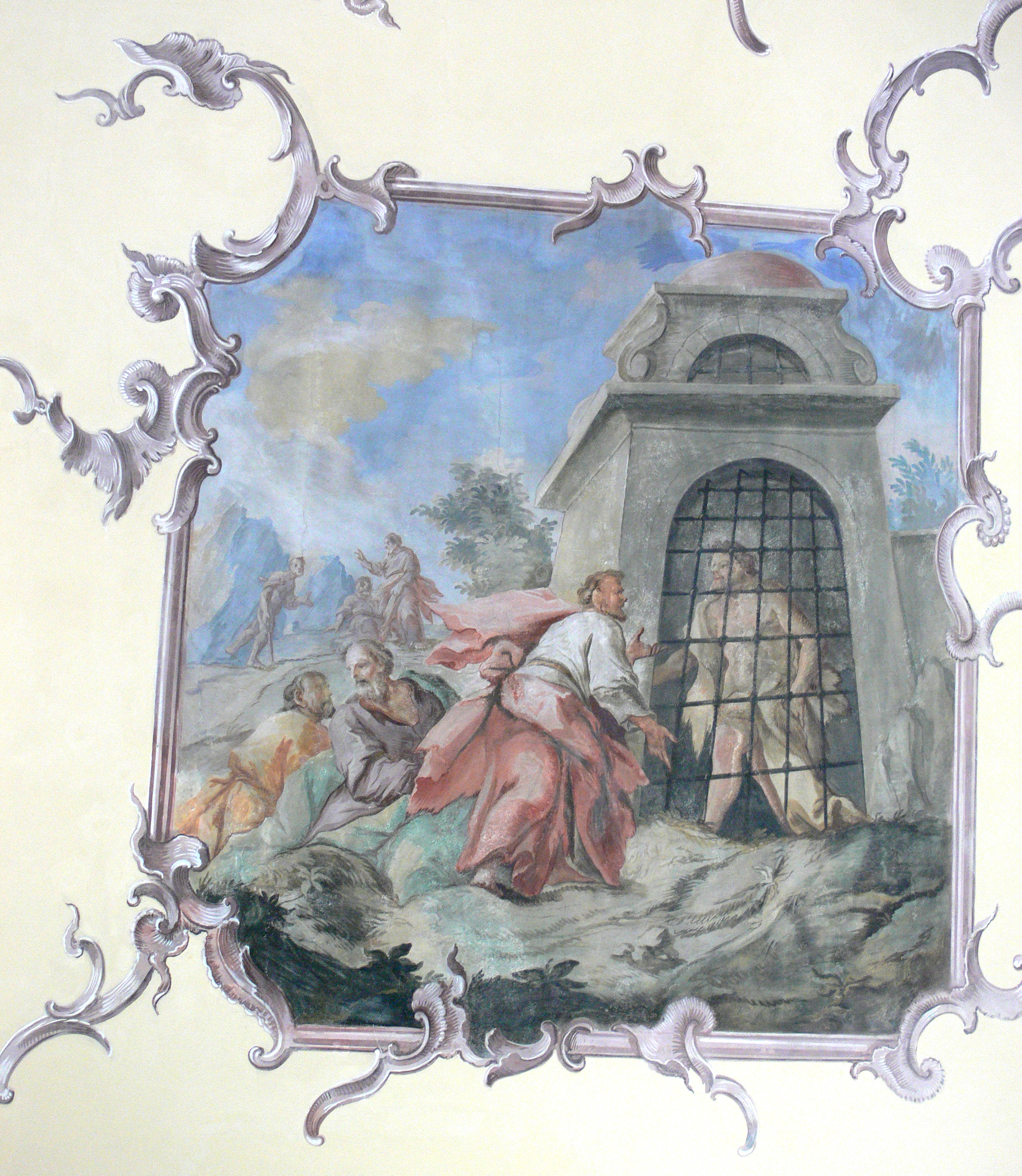
John the Baptist in prison, by Hafner, 1750

Craig A. Evans states that almost all modern scholars consider the Josephus passage on John to be authentic in its entirety, and that what Josephus states about John fits well both with the general depiction of John in the New Testament and within the historical context of the activities of other men, their preachings and their promises during that period.

Louis Feldman, who believes the Josephus passage on John is authentic, states that Christian interpolators would have been very unlikely to have devoted almost twice as much space to John (163 words) as to Jesus (89 words). Feldman also states that a Christian interpolator would have likely altered Josephus's passage about John the Baptist to make the circumstances of the death of John become similar to the New Testament, and to indicate that John was a forerunner of Jesus.

James Dunn states that the accounts of Josephus and the New Testament regarding John the Baptist are closer than they may appear at a first reading. Dunn states that Josephus positions John as a righteous preacher (dikaiosyne) who encourages his followers to practice "righteousness towards one another, and piety towards God" and that Mark 6:20 similarly calls John "a righteous (dikaios) and holy man". Dunn states that Antipas likely saw John as a figure whose ascetic lifestyle and calls for moral reform could provoke a popular uprising on moral grounds, as both Josephus and the New Testament suggest.

Justin Meggitt states that there are fundamental similarities between the Josephus portrayal of John the Baptist and the New Testament narrative in that in both accounts John is positioned as a preacher of morality, not as someone who had challenged the political authority of Herod Antipas. W. E. Nunnally states that the John passage is considered authentic and that Josephus' emphasis on the egalitarian nature of John's teachings fit well into the biblical and historical traditions.

In Origen's apologetic work Contra Celsum, made an explicit reference to the Josephus passage discussing John the Baptist:

For in the 18th book of his Antiquities of the Jews, Josephus bears witness to John as having been a Baptist, and as promising purification to those who underwent the rite.

— Contra Celsum, Book I, Chapter XLVII (emphasis added)

Here, Origen provides a clear, unambiguous indication that the passage concerning John the Baptist existed in his early manuscript of Antiquities of the Jews. This implies that the John the Baptist passage would have had to have been interpolated into the Antiquities at quite an early date, before the time of Origen, if it is inauthentic.

In Ecclesiastical History (Book I, Chapter XI), Eusebius also discusses the Josephus reference to Herod Antipas's killing of John the Baptist, and mentions the marriage to Herodias in paragraphs 1–6.

=== Arguments against authenticity ===
Rivka Nir argues that the kind of baptism performed by John the Baptist was not considered legitimate in the mainstream Jewish circles to which Josephus belonged, and therefore Josephus could not have described John as positively as he is in Antiquities, Book 18. Nir therefore concludes that the passage is likely a Christian interpolation. Joel Marcus states that Nir's argument is based on an outdated notion of "mainstream Judaism" which fails to consider the essential diversity of Second Temple Judaism during this period.

Claire Rothschild has stated that the absence of Christian interpolations in the Josephus passage on John the Baptist can not by itself be used as an argument for its authenticity, but is merely an indication of the lack of tampering.

=== Differences with Christian sources ===
The marriage of Herod Antipas and Herodias is mentioned both in Josephus and in the gospels, and scholars consider Josephus as a key connection in establishing the approximate chronology of specific episodes related to John the Baptist. However, although both the gospels and Josephus refer to Herod Antipas killing John the Baptist, they differ on the details and motives, e.g. whether this act was a consequence of the marriage of Herod Antipas and Herodias (as indicated in Matthew 14:4, Mark 6:18), or a pre-emptive measure by Herod which possibly took place before the marriage to quell a possible uprising based on the remarks of John, as Josephus suggests in Antiquities 18.5.2. Jean Daniélou contends that Josephus missed the religious meaning while recording only the political aspect of the conflict between Herod and John, which led to the latter's death.

While Josephus identifies the location of the imprisonment of John as Machaerus, southeast of the mouth of the Jordan river, the gospels mention no location for the place where John was imprisoned. According to other historical accounts Machaerus was rebuilt by Herod the Great around 30 BC and then passed to Herod Antipas. The AD 36 date of the conflict with Aretas IV (mentioned by Josephus) is consistent with the approximate date of the marriage of Herod Antipas and Herodias estimated by other historical methods.

Louis Feldman has stated that there is "no necessary contradiction between Josephus and the gospels as to the reason why John was put to death" in that the Christians chose to emphasize the moral charges while Josephus emphasized the political fears that John stirred in Herod.

Josephus stated (Antiquities 18.5.2) that the AD 36 defeat of Herod Antipas in the conflicts with Aretas IV of Nabatea was widely considered by the Jews of the time as misfortune brought about by Herod's unjust execution of John the Baptist. The approximate dates presented by Josephus are in concordance with other historical records, and most scholars view the variation between the motive presented by Josephus and the New Testament accounts is seen as an indication that the Josephus passage is not a Christian interpolation.

== The three passages in relation to The Jewish Wars ==
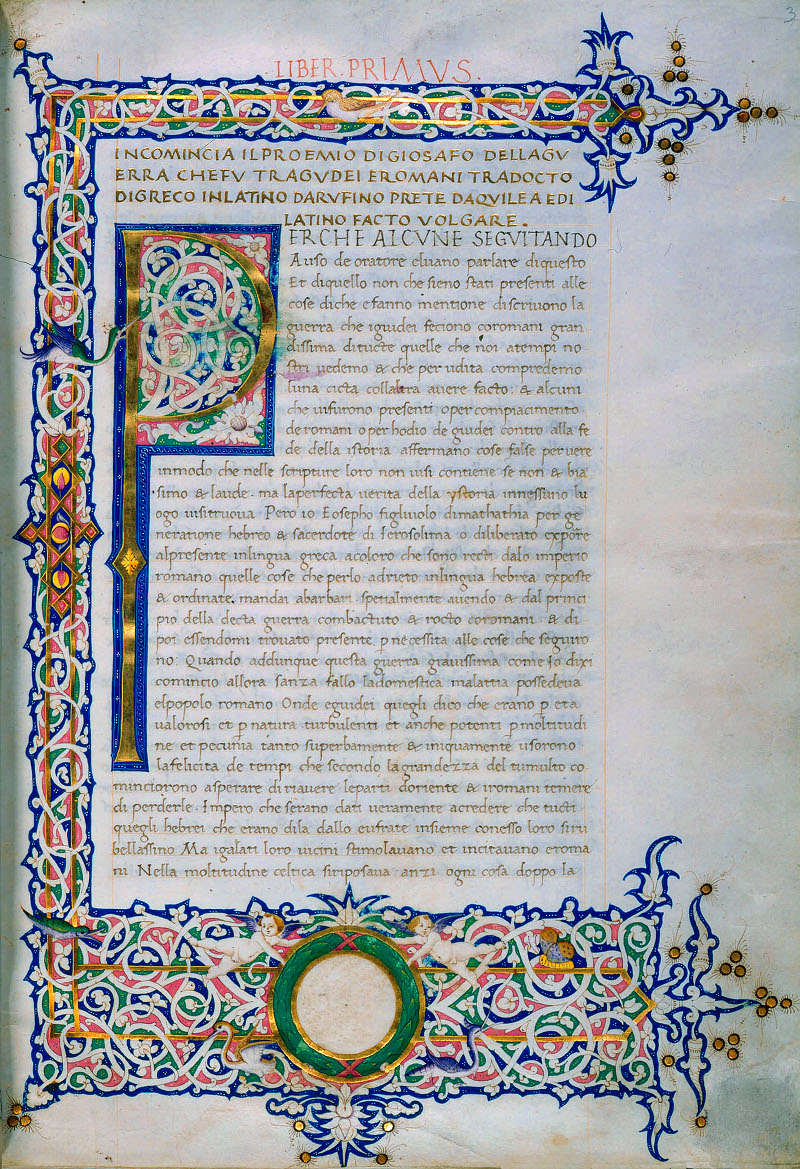
A fifteenth-century copy of The Jewish War in Italian

Louis Feldman states that it is significant that the passages on James and John are found in the Antiquities and not in the Jewish Wars, but provides three explanations for their absence from the Jewish Wars. One explanation is that the Antiquities covers the time period involved at a greater length than the Jewish Wars. The second explanation is that during the gap between the writing of the Jewish Wars (c. AD 70) and Antiquities (after AD 90) Christians had become more important in Rome and were hence given attention in the Antiquities. Another explanation is that the passages were added to the Antiquities to highlight the power of the Pharisees, but he considers the last explanation less likely than the others.

One of the arguments against the authenticity of the James passage has been that in the Jewish Wars Josephus portrays the High Priest Ananus in a positive manner, while in the Antiquities he writes of Ananus in a negative tone. Louis Feldman rejects these arguments against the authenticity of the James passage and states that in several other unrelated cases the Jewish Wars also differs from the Antiquities, and that an interpolator would have made the two accounts correspond more closely to each other, not make them differ.

The twenty-year gap between the writing of the Jewish Wars and the Antiquities has also been used to explain some of the differences in tone between them. Clemens Thoma provides an explanation for this based on the observation that Josephus may have learned of the details of the actions of Ananus in the twenty-year gap between the writing of the Jewish Wars and the Antiquities, and thus avoided a positive tone when writing of Ananus in the Antiquities.

John Painter also states that the difference in the context for the Jewish Wars and the Antiquities may account for some of the differences in tone between them. When writing of Ananus in a positive tone in the Jewish Wars, the context was Ananus' prudence in avoiding a war and hence Josephus considered that a positive aspect. However, when writing in the Antiquities about the actions of Ananus which resulted in his demotion from the High Priesthood, the context required the manifestation of a negative aspect of Ananus' character.

== See also ==
- Caesar's Messiah
- Christianity in the first century
- Historicity of Jesus
- History of early Christianity
- Mara bar Serapion on Jesus
- Roman Judaea
- Sources for the historicity of Jesus
- Tacitus on Jesus
