= Apocalypse of John Chrysostom =

Start of the Apocalypse in Parisinus Graecus 947, copied in 1574

The Apocalypse of John Chrysostom, also called the Second Apocryphal Apocalypse of John, is a Christian text composed in Greek between the 6th and 8th centuries AD. Although the text is often called an apocalypse by analogy with the similarly structured First Apocryphal Apocalypse of John, the text is not a true apocalypse. In the manuscripts, it is called "a word of teaching" or "a treatise". It is usually classified as part of the New Testament apocrypha because it describes an apocryphal encounter between John of Patmos and Jesus. In a number of manuscripts, it is presented as a sermon of John Chrysostom, who, rather than the apostle, is Jesus's interlocutor.

The basic structure, which it shares with the First Apocalypse, is erotapocritic (question-and-answer), but, whereas in the First Apocalypse the questions deal with eschatology, in the Apocalypse of John Chrysostom they mostly concern earthly matters. John asks Jesus about sin, Sundays, fasting, the meaning of the liturgy, deference to priests, baptism, the proper length of hair and love.

François Nau first published the text with a French translation based on the 16th-century manuscript Parisinus Graecus 947, where it is found at folios 276–282, at the end of a collection of miscellaneous texts. There it is written in garbled Cypriot Greek, probably a translation from an earlier vernacular Greek original. Nau believed that the original was also written on Cyprus. There is an English translation.

== Bibliography ==
- Court, John M. (2000). The Book of Revelation and the Johannine Apocalyptic Tradition. Sheffield Academic Press.
- Elliott, J. K. (1993). The Apocryphal New Testament: A Collection of Apocryphal Christian Literature in an English Translation. Clarendon Press.
- Nau, François (1914). "Une deuxième apocalypse apocryphe grecque de Saint Jean". Revue Biblique. 23 (2): 209–221. JSTOR 44101528.
- Spittler, Janet E. (2019). "2 Apocryphal Apocalypse of John". e-Clavis: Christian Apocrypha. North American Society for the Study of Christian Apocryphal Literature (NASSCAL).
- Tóth, Péter (2017). "New Wine in Old Wineskin: Byzantine Reuses of the Apocryphal Revelation Dialogue". In Averil Cameron; Niels Gaul (eds.). Dialogues and Debates from Late Antiquity to Late Byzantium. pp. 77–93.
- Whealey, Alice (2002). "The Apocryphal Apocalypse of John: A Byzantine Apocalypse from the Early Islamic Period". The Journal of Theological Studies. 53 (2): 533–540. doi:10.1093/jts/53.2.533.
