= Robert Whealey =

American historian (1930–2026)

Robert H. Whealey (May 16, 1930 – May 7, 2026) was an American historian with expertise on the Spanish Civil War and how it was influenced by Hitler. He is Professor Emeritus of Ohio University He also wrote for the History News Service.

Whealey's daughter, Alice Whealey, is author of the book, Josephus on Jesus: The Testimonium Flavianum Controversy from Late Antiquity to Modern Times.

He lived in Athens, Ohio, Whealey died on May 7, 2026, at the age of 95.
