= Lawrence Schiffman =

American archaeologist and Jewish historian (born 1948)

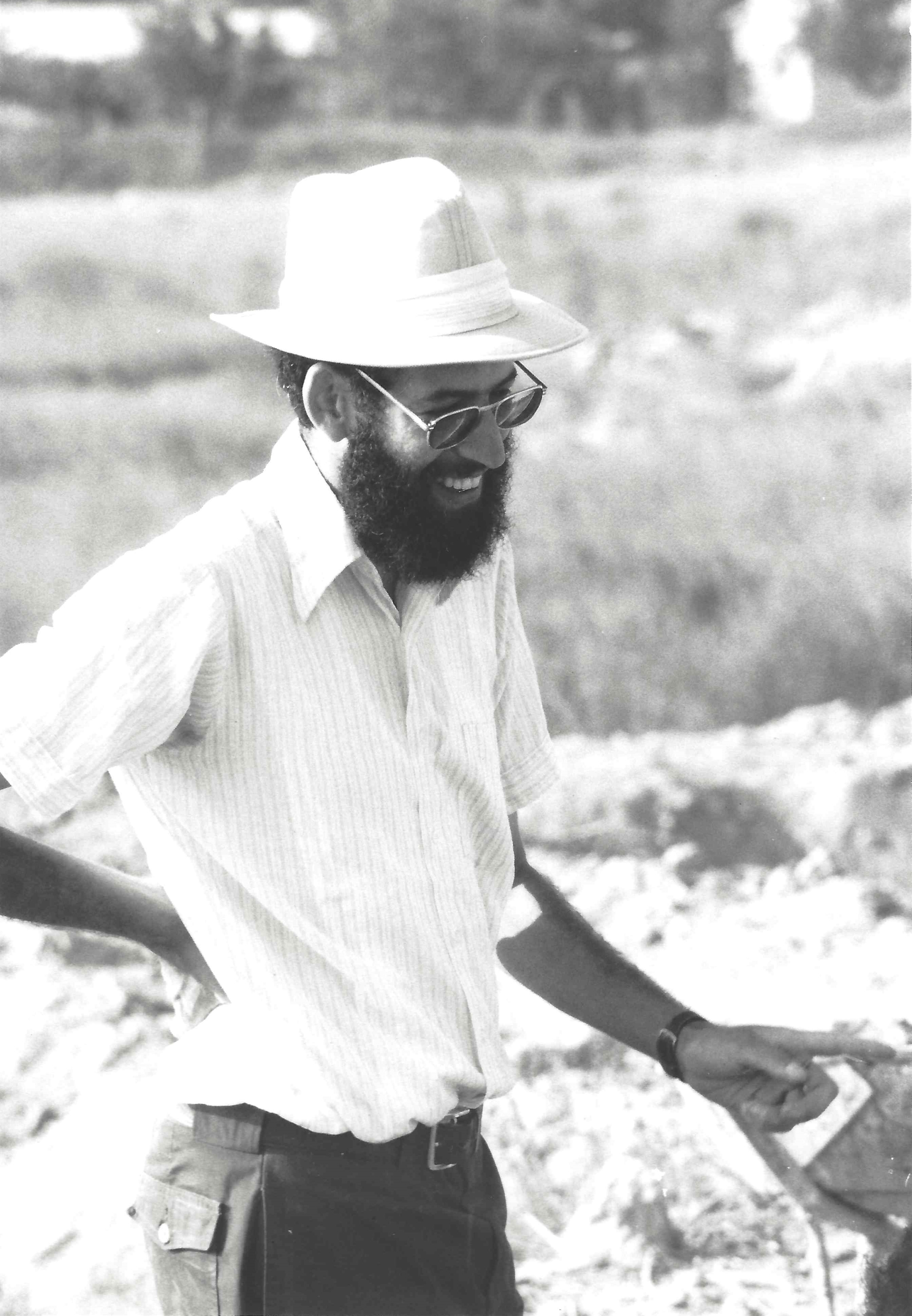
- Schiffman in 1981
- Born: Lawrence Harvey Schiffman; 1948 (age 77–78)

Academic background
- Education: Brandeis University
- Thesis: The Halakhah at Qumran (1974)

Academic work
- Discipline: Biblical studies; Jewish studies
- Sub-discipline: Dead Sea Scrolls; Judaism in Late Antiquity; history of Jewish law; Talmudic literature
- Institutions: Yeshiva University; New York University
- Website: lawrenceschiffman.com

Lawrence Harvey Schiffman (born 1948) is a professor at New York University (as of 2014); he was formerly Vice-Provost of Undergraduate Education at Yeshiva University and Professor of Jewish Studies (from early 2011 to 2014). He had previously been Chair of New York University's Skirball Department of Hebrew and Judaic Studies and served as the Ethel and Irvin A. Edelman Professor in Hebrew and Judaic Studies at New York University (NYU). He is currently the Judge Abraham Lieberman Professor of Hebrew and Judaic Studies at New York University and Director of the Global Institute for Advanced Research in Jewish Studies. He is a specialist in the Dead Sea Scrolls, Judaism in late antiquity, the history of Jewish law, and Talmudic literature.

== Education ==
Schiffman was a graduate of Great Neck North High School. He received his BA, MA, and PhD degrees from the Department of Near Eastern and Judaic Studies at Brandeis University. His senior thesis was devoted to the use of Psalms in the Qumran Hodayot. His PhD thesis eventually became his first book, The Halakhah at Qumran.

== Memberships ==
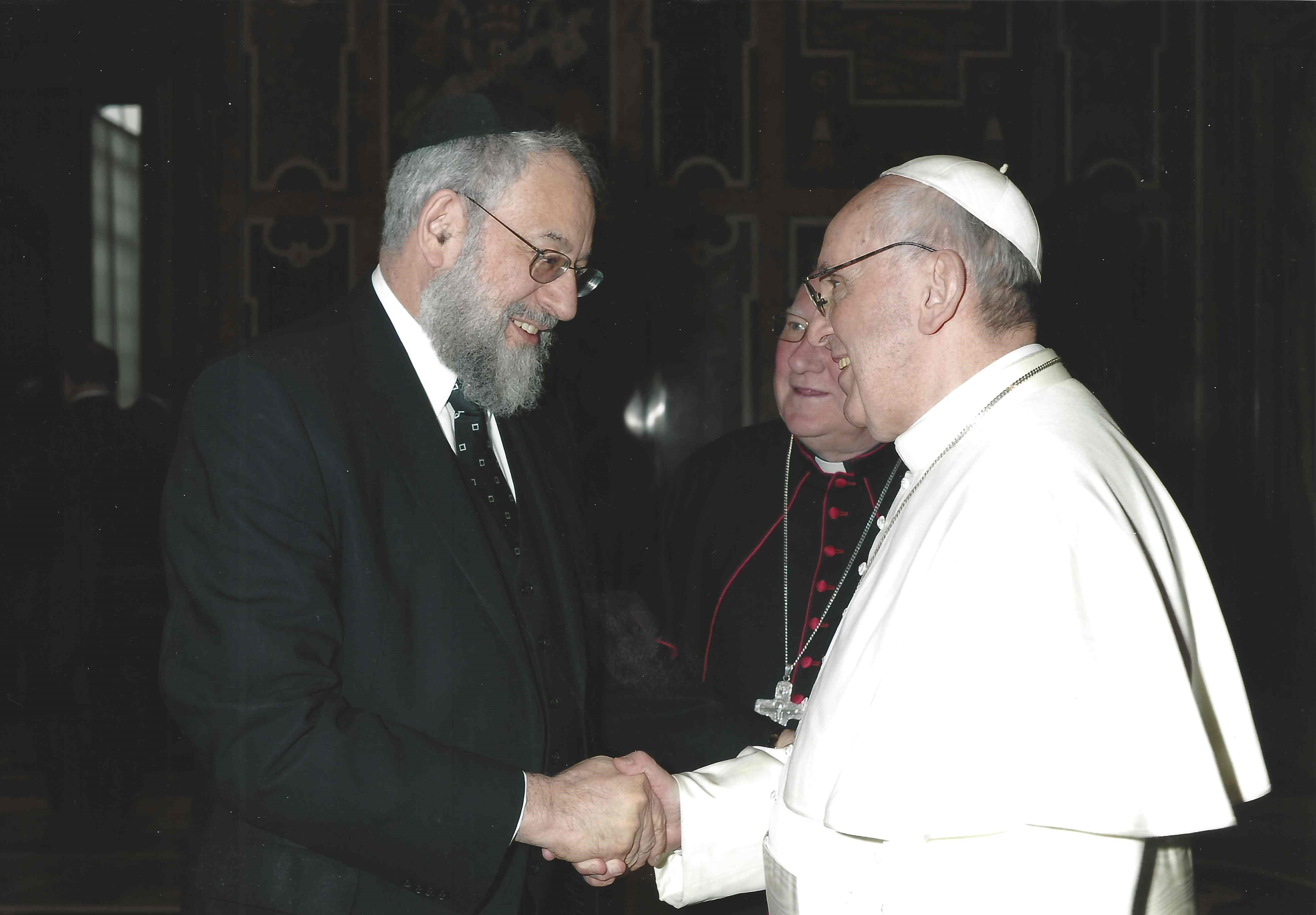
Lawrence Schiffman with Pope Francis

Schiffman is a member of the university's Center for Ancient Studies and Center for Near Eastern Studies. He served as president of the Association for Jewish Studies from 2000 to 2003. During the academic year 1989/90 he was a fellow of the Institute for Advanced Studies of the Hebrew University of Jerusalem as part of a research group dealing with the Dead Sea Scrolls. He was a member of the academic committee for the Summer, 1997 celebration of the fiftieth anniversary of the discovery of the Dead Sea Scrolls and the 2008 60th anniversary conference, both held in Jerusalem. He is a fellow of the American Academy for Jewish Research and a corresponding fellow of the Rennert Center for Jerusalem Studies at Bar-Ilan University. He has been chairman of the Columbia University Seminar for the Study of the Hebrew Bible. He is a member of the board of the World Union for Jewish Studies and the Society for Biblical Literature where he served as chairman of the Qumran section. He is a member of the Enoch seminar and of the advisory board of Henoch. He is also chairman of the International Jewish Committee on Interreligious Consultations (IJCIC) and led an IJCIC delegation for a meeting with Pope Francis at the Vatican in June 2013, according to the World Jewish Congress.

He served on the academic panel of the Rohr Jewish Learning Institute's Sinai Scholars Society Academic Symposium, and as a scholar-in-residence at the National Jewish Retreat.

== Film appearances ==
Schiffman was featured in the PBS Nova series documentary, Secrets of the Dead Sea Scrolls, as well as in four BBC documentaries on the scrolls, the McNeil–Lehrer program, and a Discovery special. He appears regularly in the popular educational series Mysteries of the Bible, which appears on Arts and Entertainment (A&E), and more recently, in the four-part series Kingdom of David on PBS.

== Visiting professorships ==
Schiffman served as director of New York University's program at the archaeological excavations at Dor, Israel, from 1980 to 1982, in conjunction with the Hebrew University in Jerusalem and the Israel Exploration Society. He has served as visiting professor at Yale University, Ben Gurion University of the Negev, Duke University, Shier Visiting Distinguished Professor in Judaic Studies at the University of Toronto, the Johns Hopkins University, the Russian State University for the Humanities in Moscow, the Luce Visiting professor at the University of Hartford and the Hartford Seminary, the Pontifical Gregorian University in Rome, Queens College and Yeshiva University.

== Contributions to the field of Dead Sea Scrolls ==
In 1985, Schiffman helped organize a Dead Sea Scrolls conference at New York University, where the field of Dead Sea Scrolls became organized as a separate field in Judaism in late antiquity.

He also played a role in the behind-the-scenes maneuvering that led to the full publication of the scrolls and to the decision of the Israel Antiquities Authority to make them fully available to the academic community. He focuses in his research on showing that the Dead Sea Scrolls are Jewish texts and do not have far-reaching and dramatic implications for the study of Christianity.

In 1992/3 Schiffman was a fellow of the Annenberg Research Institute in Philadelphia where he was part of a research team working on the unpublished scrolls. Together with a colleague, he served as editor-in-chief of the Oxford Encyclopedia of the Dead Sea Scrolls (2000). In 1991, he was appointed to the team publishing the scrolls in the Oxford series, Discoveries in the Judean Desert. He edited the journal Dead Sea Discoveries for ten years. He served as editor-in-chief of the Center for Online Judaic Studies in New York.

In 2011, Schiffman was a consultant for the Dead Sea Scrolls exhibit which showcased the significance of the scrolls at Discovery Times Square. The exhibit, entitled "The Dead Sea Scrolls: Life and Faith in Biblical Times", brought artifacts from the biblical and Second Temple period to New York City. Some of these artifacts (including scrolls) had never been exhibited outside Israel before.

In 2020, a Festschrift was published in his honor by former students and colleagues. The volume, entitled From Scrolls to Traditions, contains 20 articles on the Biblical period, Second Temple period and the Dead Sea Scrolls.

== Works ==
=== Thesis ===
- Schiffman, Lawrence H. (1974). The Halakhah at Qumran (in 2 volumes) (Thesis). Ann Arbor, MI: Brandeis University. OCLC 5803566.

=== Books ===
- ——— (1975). The Halakhah at Qumran. Studies in Judaism in late antiquity. Vol. 16. Leiden: E. J. Brill. – general publication of his thesis.
- ——— (1983). Sectarian Law in the Dead Sea Scrolls: Courts, Testimony, and the Penal Code. Brown Judaic studies. Vol. 33. Chico, CA: Scholars Press. ISBN 9780891305699. OCLC 8306209.
- ——— (1985). Who Was a Jew? Rabbinic Perspectives on the Jewish-Christian Schism. Hoboken, NJ: Ktav. ISBN 9780881250541. OCLC 11068913.
- ——— (1991). From Text to Tradition: A History of Second Temple and Rabbinic Judaism. Hoboken, NJ: Ktav. ISBN 9780881253719. OCLC 23733614.
- ———; Swartz, Michael D. (1992). Hebrew and Aramaic Magical Texts from the Cairo Genizah. Sheffield: JSOT Press. ISBN 9781850752851.
- ——— (1993). Halakhah, Halikhah u-Meshihiyut be-Khat Midbar Yehudah (Law, Custom, and Messianism in the Dead Sea Sect). Jerusalem: Merkaz Shazar. ISBN 9789652270740. OCLC 28076375. – (in Hebrew)
- ——— (1994). Reclaiming the Dead Sea Scrolls. Philadelphia, PA: Jewish Publication Society. ISBN 9780827605305. OCLC 30738927.
- ——— (1998). Texts and Traditions: A Source Reader for the Study of Second Temple and Rabbinic Judaism. Hoboken, NJ: Ktav.
- ——— (2003). Understanding Second Temple and Rabbinic Judaism. Hoboken, NJ: Ktav.
- ——— (2008). The Courtyards of the House of the Lord: Studies on the Temple Scroll. Leiden: E. J. Brill.

=== Edited by ===
- ———; VanderKam, James C., eds. (2000). Encyclopedia of the Dead Sea Scrolls (A–M). Vol. 1. New York: Oxford University Press. ISBN 9780195137972.
- ———; VanderKam, James C., eds. (2000). Encyclopedia of the Dead Sea Scrolls (N–Z). Vol. 2. New York: Oxford University Press. ISBN 9780195137965.

== Awards ==
2014: co-recipient of the National Jewish Book Award in the Scholarship category with Louis H. Feldman and James L. Kugel for editing Outside the Bible

Professional and academic associations
Preceded by David Berger	President of the Association for Jewish Studies; 2000–2003	Succeeded by Judith R. Baskin
