= James Kugel =

American-Israeli biblical scholar

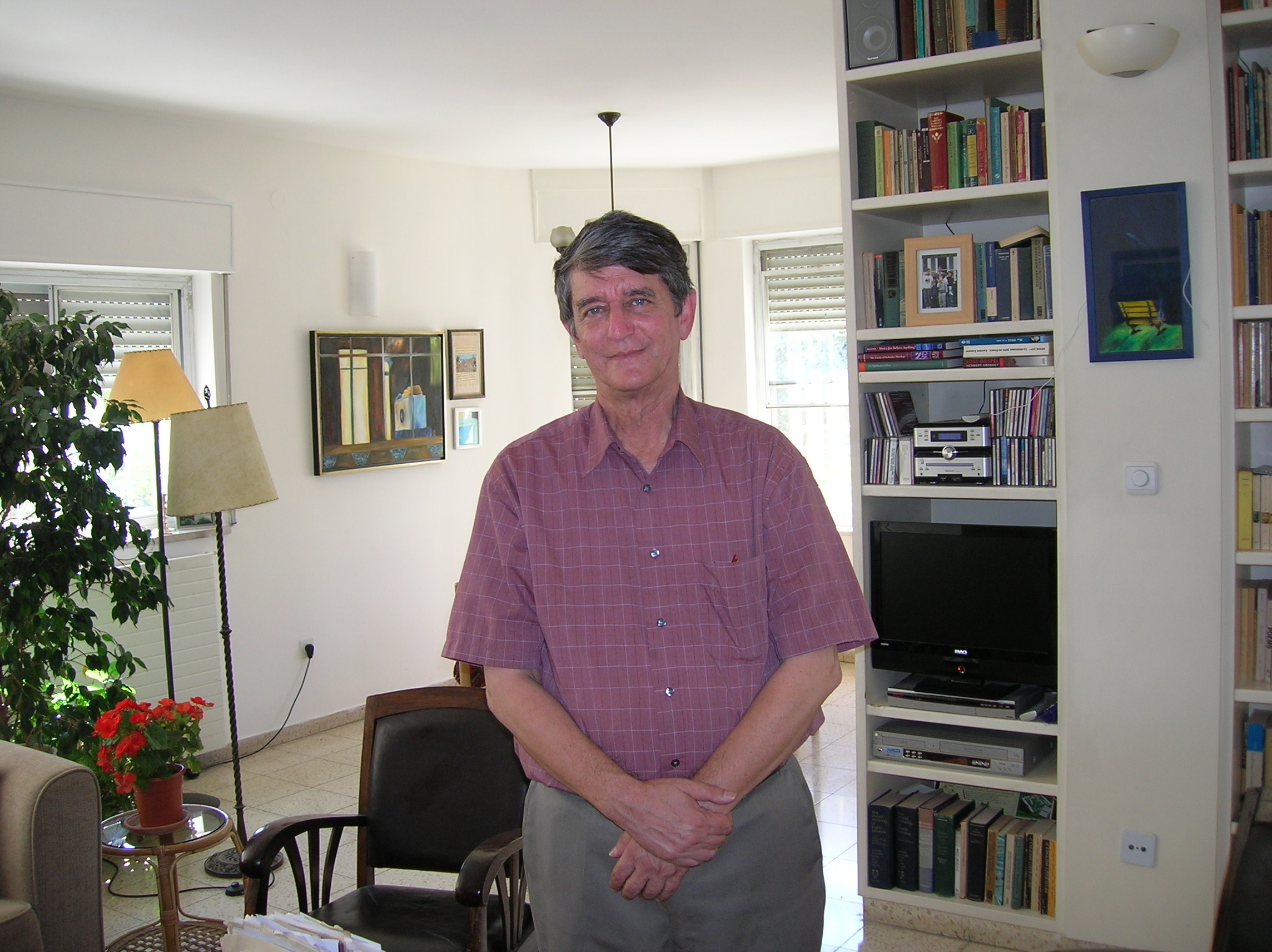
James Kugel

James L. Kugel (Hebrew: Yaakov Kaduri, יעקב כדורי; born August 22, 1945) is an Israeli professor emeritus in the Bible department at Bar Ilan University in Israel and the Harry M. Starr Professor Emeritus of Classical and Modern Hebrew Literature at Harvard University. Since 2017, he has been a member of the Israel Academy of Sciences and Humanities.

James Kugel was the author and editor of 16 books and numerous articles on the Bible and its early commentators, focusing on the Second Temple period. He identifies as an Orthodox Jew. Moment Magazine published a long-form profile called, "Professor of Disbelief," on James Kugel in their MARCH/APRIL 2014 issue.

In 2001, his book, the Bible As It Was won the University of Louisville and the Louisville Presbyterian Theological Seminary Grawemeyer Award in religion. The prize "recognizes outstanding and creative works that promote understanding of the relationship between human beings and the divine." The Bible As It Was was published in 1997 by Harvard University. It is the annotated version of a lengthier work, entitled Traditions of the Bible. In 2007, How to Read the Bible was given the Everett Family Foundation Jewish Book of the Year Award by the Jewish Book Council. Kugel is a co-recipient of the 2014 National Jewish Book Award in the Scholarship category for editing Outside the Bible with Louis H. Feldman and Lawrence H. Schiffman.

He earned his B.A. at Yale University (1968), was a Harvard University, Junior Fellow (1972-76), and earned his Ph.D. at City University of New York (1978). He lectured at Harvard University (1979-80), before moving to Yale as assistant professor, religious studies and comparative literature, (1980-82) and associate professor (1982). He became Starr Professor of Hebrew Literature at Harvard (1982-2003), and in parallel professor of Bible, Bar Ilan University (1992-2013).
