= Reclaiming the Dead Sea Scrolls =

1994 book by Lawrence Schiffman

- Title page for Reclaiming the Dead Sea Scrolls (1994)
- Author: Lawrence Schiffman
- Language: English
- Genre: Non-fiction
- Publisher: Doubleday
- Publication date: 1994

Reclaiming the Dead Sea Scrolls is a book was written by Lawrence Schiffman, published in 1994 by Doubleday, as part of the Anchor Research Library. The book's aim was to explain the true meaning of the Dead Sea Scrolls for Judaism and Christianity. Previous to the publication of the book, many exaggerated and irresponsible claims about the scrolls were published. Reclaiming the Dead Sea Scrolls, according to itself, “sets before the public the real Dead Sea Scrolls.”

The book sets forth the author's theory that the Dead Sea Scrolls were gathered at Qumran by a sect which left Jerusalem in the aftermath of the Maccabean Revolt. When the Hasmonean rulers accepted the rulings of the Pharisees, these Sadducees took up residence in the Judean desert.

== Contents ==
I. Discovery and Disclosure: Liberating the Scrolls
II. The Community at Qumran
III. Closing the Canon: Biblical Texts and Interpretations
IV. To Live as a Jew
V. Mysticism, Messianism, and the End of Days
VI. Sectarianism, Nationalism and Consensus
