= Caesar's Messiah =

2005 book by Joseph Atwill

- Author: Joseph Atwill
- Publication date: 2005

Caesar's Messiah is a 2005 book by Joseph Atwill that argues that the New Testament Gospels were written by a group of individuals connected to the Flavian family of Roman emperors: Vespasian and his sons, Titus and Domitian. The authors are alleged to have been mainly Flavius Josephus, Berenice, and Tiberius Julius Alexander, with contributions from Pliny the Elder. Although Vespasian and Titus had defeated Jewish nationalist Zealots in the First Jewish–Roman War of 70 AD, the emperors wanted to control the spread of Judaism and moderate its political virulence and continuing militancy against Rome. Christianity, a pacifist and pro-Roman-authority religion, was ostensibly their solution.

Atwill's support of the Christ myth theory contradicts the mainstream scholarly view that, while the Gospels may include many religious distortions, a historical Jesus lived in the 1st-century Roman province of Judaea, was baptized by John the Baptist and crucified by the order of Roman Prefect Pontius Pilate. The work has been thoroughly rejected even by the minority of historians who support the Christ myth theory, such as Richard C. Carrier, who suggested that it was likely not the Romans but "exasperated Jews like Paul" who constructed the religion to bring Jewish holdouts into accord with imperial rule.

== 1st century Flavian Christians ==
Atwill asserts that the Flavian family was involved with early Christianity. It is claimed that the Roman theology of Victory fueled the family's goal to destroy Jerusalem and their imperial ambition. According to the sixth-century Acts of Saints Nereus and Achilleus, Pope Clement I was the son of Titus Flavius Sabinus. Atwill argues, that Pope Clement describes himself as being like a Roman prefect, giving orders to his soldiers which he expects to be obeyed (1 Clem. 37:2-3). Atwill speculates that Saint Veronica may be the same person as Berenice, mistress of Emperor Titus.

Assuming that at least some of this information linking the Flavian family to early Christianity is correct, Atwill points out that these early connections are very difficult to explain if Christianity was a struggling grassroots movement originating in Judaea. In addition, the sacraments of the early Christian church, its College of Bishops, and the title of its leader (the Pontiff) were all based in Rome, and on Roman, rather than Judaic traditions. In rebuttal, Acharya S, in a review of Atwill's work, said that these Flavians were Chrestians, not Christians, and that the Chrestians were only one of several sects that were incorporated into later Roman Christianity.

== Typological representation of the Emperor Titus in the Gospels ==
Echoes of Old Testament stories are often found in the New Testament, in a relationship in which the Old Testament model is called the "type" and the New Testament reprise is called the "antitype". The study of these types and antitypes is called typology. Atwill claims that similar typological relationships knit together the Gospels and the works of Flavius Josephus.

Atwill notes that according to the Preterist school of biblical interpretation, the prophecies of Jesus and Daniel were fulfilled by the destruction of Jerusalem in 70 AD. He suggests that this is evidence that the Gospels (including the prophecies of the coming of the Son of man) were actually written after the Jewish War, and that the Gospels are ironically predicting that Titus is the anticipated 'Son of Man'.

Atwill argues that Jesus's mission in the Gospels foreshadows the military campaign of Titus in Judaea. According to Atwill, this indicates that the Gospel authors wanted to signal that the character Jesus Christ, as the fulfillment of the messianic prophecies of the Hebrew scriptures, was a representation of Titus Flavius. Also, Atwill says that Josephus's narrative in The Jewish War is built around the idea that Daniel's prophecy was fulfilled by Titus's conquest of Jerusalem and the destruction of the Second Temple. Atwill sees this as an ironic juxtaposition of events, as Titus Flavius destroyed the Temple and conquered Jerusalem, and turned it over to the Romans.

Christ myth theorist Robert M. Price said that Atwill's view that the Gospel son of man who would destroy Jerusalem was Titus, was "one of Atwill's most attractive suggestions".

== Josephus' satirical view of Christianity ==
Scholarly debate over Josephus's knowledge of Christianity has centered on two explicit passages in the Antiquities of the Jews: the Testimonium Flavianum (Ant. 18.3) and a passage that mentions James as the brother of Jesus (Ant. 20.9). Atwill argues that in addition to those brief passages, Josephus wrote several vicious satires of the Gospel narrative and Christian faith, indicating that he was highly familiar with its tenets, but also disdainful.

The first occurs at The Jewish War 3.10, where Josephus describes an attack by Titus against Jewish rebels (led by a man named Jesus) at the lake of Gennesareth, in which the rebels are drowned and speared like fish. The Sea of Galilee (another term for the lake of Gennesaret) is the lake where Jesus told his disciples that they would become "fishers of men" in Luke 3:21. Josephus enigmatically describes the lake of Gennesereth as 'a vein of the Nile' where 'Coracin fish' grow. "Chorazain" was a Galilean rebel town, cursed by Jesus at Matthew 11:21. Atwill argues that the two events, both built on the "fishers of men" trope, must be read together to understand the satirical meaning of the authors.

In Wars 4.7, the rebel leader John is described as suffering a sort of inflammation or distemper. His party meets Vespasian at Gadara, where the rebels are driven into the River Jordan. The passage contains dense verbal parallels to the Gospel description of Jesus meeting the demoniac at the land of Gadarenes, who contains a legion of unclean spirits that enter into herd of swine and then drown themselves in the sea. According to Josephus, the Romans captured a 'mighty prey' of livestock, but no swine. Atwill conjectures that there were no swine captured because they had all run into the river.

The Gospel narratives of Luke 10:38-42 and John 12:2-3 describe a dinner just after Lazarus has been raised from the dead. "They made him a supper", John says, and "Mary has chosen the good portion." Atwill sees this as a macabre cannibalistic double entendre, and a parallel to Wars 6.3, in which Josephus describes a woman named Mary who is pierced by famine. She roasts her baby son as if he was a Passover lamb, eating half of him while saving "a very fine portion" to be eaten later. "Come, eat of this food", she says, in words which (Atwill argues) are reminiscent of the Catholic eucharist.

Wars 6.5 describes the fate of a certain Jesus, the son of Ananus. This Jesus cries "A voice from the east, a voice from the west, a voice from the four winds, a voice against Jerusalem and the holy house, a voice against the bridegrooms and the brides, and a voice against this whole people!" No matter how severely whipped, this Jesus simply repeats again and again, "Woe, woe to Jerusalem." Finally he says, "woe to myself also", and he is killed by a stone from the Roman artillery. In these passages, Atwill sees a parody of Jesus's sayings in Matt. 23:13-33, 24:27-25:1 and Luke 11:43-52.

Atwill claims to have discovered another sprawling satire in the Gospels and Josephus, which he calls the "New Root and Branch." Atwill wrote: "The purpose of this particular satire is to document that the 'root' and 'branch' of the Judaic messianic lineage has been destroyed and that a Roman lineage has been 'grafted on' in its place."

Christ myth theorist Richard Carrier analyzed all of these alleged parallels and stated that they can be explained as either coincidences, mistranslations, or references to Old Testament sources or tropes.

== The Testimonium Flavianum and the Decius Mundus puzzle ==
Atwill argues (contrary to many scholars) that the Testimonium Flavianum (Ant. 18.3) is genuine because he sees it as the introduction to a literary triptych. Immediately following the Testimonium Flavianum is the story of Decius Mundus, who pretends to be the god Anubis, to trick a woman named Paulina into having sex. Atwill sees Decius's name as a pun on Publius Decius Mus, a sacrificial hero of the Roman Republic. As the story continues, Paulina's husband Saturninus agrees that it would be no sin for Paulina to have sex with a god. So Paulina and Decius Mundus sleep together, but Mundus returns on the third day to boast that he is not a god. Atwill argues that Mundus's return is a parody of Jesus's resurrection, and that his worshippers Paulina and Saturninus have obviously been swindled.

Albert Bell, in his paper "Josephus the Satirist?", speculated that the satirical nature of the Decius Mundus story was understood in the 4th century. According to Bell, the author of pseudo-Hegesippus may have elaborated on the joke by making Paulina become possibly pregnant by Anubis, thus making her parody of the Virgin Mary.

== The authors and purpose of the Gospels ==
As stated above, Atwill states that the authors of the Gospels were mainly Flavius Josephus, the Herodian princess Berenice, and the military general Tiberius Julius Alexander, with contributions from (the Gentile) Pliny the Elder. However, the book ends without Atwill offering any timeline or scenario in which these individuals collaborated for a years-long project. Nor does he explain how the work was disseminated, or why it was adopted by (purportedly) messianic Jews around the Mediterranean, or how this provenance segues into the known history of second-century Christianity. As for the theological and narrative differences among the Gospels, they were deliberate. Atwill explains, "The New Testament is designed as a sort of intelligence test, whose true meaning can be understood only by those possessing sufficient memory, logic, and irreverent humor." Price writes, "Atwill implicitly congratulates himself as the only one in history who has ever passed it... It is Atwill himself whose creation demonstrates the limitless possibilities of perverse and gratuitous interpretations of the text."

== Joseph Atwill ==
In his youth Atwill studied Greek, Latin and the Bible at St. Mary's Military Academy, a Jesuit-run school in Japan. In college he studied computer science, and co-founded software companies including Ferguson Tool Company and ASNA. After 1995, he returned to Biblical studies. Working with Robert Eisenman, he authored a paper on radiocarbon dating of the Dead Sea Scrolls. In 2014, Atwill self-published another book, Shakespeare's Secret Messiah.

== Publishing and marketing ==
Caesar's Messiah was first published by Ulysses Press in 2005. The work was endorsed by Rod Blackhirst and Jan Koster. The book carried this statement from Robert Eisenman: "Challenging and provocative... If what Joseph Atwill is saying is only partially true, we are looking into the abyss". In a review of Atwill's thesis at The Village Voice, Eisenman explained to reporter Edmund Newton that he has long believed that the Gospel texts were "over-written" to give them a pro-Roman slant. With his discoveries, "Atwill may have carried it a step forward."

The German translation was published in 2008 as Das Messias-Rätsel, and received several reviews in mainstream German publications.

The book served as the basis for a 2012 documentary film by director Fritz Heede and producer Nijole Sparkis, including interviews with Atwill, Eisenman, Kenneth Humphreys, Timothy Freke, and Dorothy Murdock.

The 2013 conference "Covert Messiah" was organized in London to discuss the film and the book's thesis. The conference attracted significant interest, but also a critique from Richard Carrier. Atwill posted a response to Carrier at his website.

Atwill's 2014 book Shakespeare's Secret Messiah expanded the thesis of Roman authorship of the New Testament, to suggest that the Pauline epistles and Revelation were written during or after the reign of Domitian.

== Reception ==
Robert M. Price wrote that Atwill engages in "the most outrageous display of parallelomania ever seen". Price agrees that the New Testament has "persistent pro-Roman tendencies", but says this was done "for apologetical reasons, to avoid persecution". Richard Carrier stated that all of Atwill's alleged parallels can be explained as coincidences, mistranslations, or references to Old Testament sources or tropes. However, Carrier agreed that the New Testament has pro-Roman aspects, saying that, "Christianity was probably constructed to 'divert Jewish hostility and aggressiveness into a pacifist religion, supportive of—and subservient to—Roman rule,' but not by Romans, but exasperated Jews like Paul."

Biblical scholar Bart Ehrman said, "I know sophomores in college who could rip this ... to shreds" and claimed that Atwill had "no training in any relevant field".

== See also ==
- The Gospel of Afranius, a proposal that Christianity was created by the Romans before Paul
