= Louis Feldman =

American classicist (1926-2017)

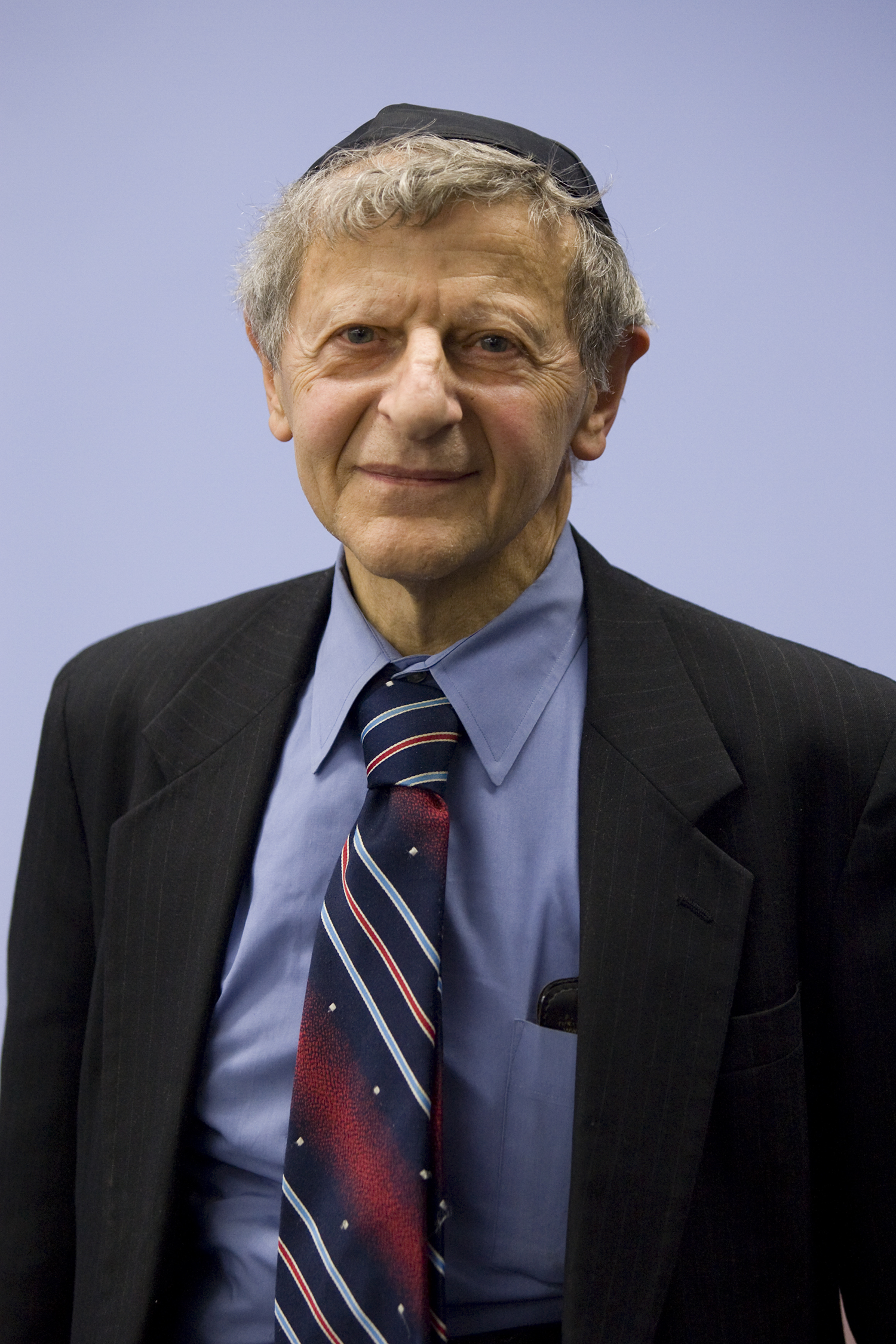
- Born: Louis Harry Feldman; October 29, 1926; Hartford, Connecticut, U.S.
- Died: March 25, 2017 (aged 90); Los Angeles, U.S.

Academic background
- Education: Trinity College (BA, MA); Harvard University (PhD)
- Thesis: Cicero's Concept of Historiography (1951)

Academic work
- Discipline: Classicist
- Institutions: Yeshiva University
- Main interests: Hellenistic civilization

Louis Harry Feldman (October 29, 1926 – March 25, 2017) was an American classicist. He was the Abraham Wouk Family Professor of Classics and Literature at Yeshiva University, the institution at which he taught since 1955.

Feldman was a scholar of Hellenistic civilization, specifically the works of Josephus Flavius. Feldman's work on Josephus is widely respected by other scholars.

== Biography ==
Feldman received his undergraduate degree (as valedictorian) from Trinity College in 1946 and his master's degree the following year. In 1951, he received his doctoral degree in philology from Harvard University for his dissertation Cicero's Concept of Historiography. He returned to Trinity College as a teaching fellow and eventually served as classics instructor before leaving for Hobart and William Smith Colleges in 1953. Feldman began teaching at Yeshiva University as an instructor in 1955, became an assistant professor in 1956, an associate professor in 1961 and, in 1966, a professor of classics. In 1993, he was appointed Abraham Wouk Family Professor of Classics and Literature at Yeshiva University.

A fellow of the American Academy for Jewish Research, he received numerous other fellowships and awards. These include a Ford Foundation Fellowship (1951–1952), a Guggenheim Fellowship (1963), a grant from the Memorial Foundation for Jewish Culture (1969), and a grant from the American Philosophical Association (1972). He was named a senior fellow of the American Council of Learned Societies in 1971, a Littauer Foundation fellow in 1973, and Institute for Advanced Study fellow in 1994. In 1981, he received the American Philological Association award for "Excellence in Teaching the Classics". Additionally, he was selected to conduct seminars for college teachers by the National Endowment for the Humanities.

Feldman was a co-recipient of the 2014 National Jewish Book Award in the Scholarship category for editing Outside the Bible with James L. Kugel and Lawrence H. Schiffman.

== Thought and writings ==
Feldman was a widely respected antiquities scholar. Robert E. Van Voorst referred to Feldman as "the dean of Josephan scholars", and Paul L. Maier referred to Feldman as "the ranking Josephus authority".

As a historian, Feldman dealt primarily with the writings of Josephus and their role within the larger framework of Jewish civilization during the Second Temple Period. His works on Josephus ranged from discussions of historical accuracy to analysis of Josephus' biblical interpretations. Overall, he viewed Josephus' work as key to understanding Jewish life and interactions with Hellenistic culture during the Greco-Roman era. In addition to his work on Josephus, he published numerous works on the writings of Philo as well as works dealing directly with the nature of Jewish life during antiquity.

Feldman's works include Scholarship on Philo and Josephus, 1937–1962 (1963), Josephus and Modern Scholarship, 1937–1980 (1984), Jew and Gentile in the Ancient World: Attitudes and Interactions from Alexander to Justinian (1993), Studies in Hellenistic Judaism (1998), and Josephus' Interpretation of the Bible (1998). Feldman also translated several volumes of the critical edition of Jewish Antiquities. He contributed extensively to journals in his field, having approximately 170 scholarly articles published. He served as departmental editor of Hellenistic literature for the first edition of Encyclopedia Judaica and as a contributor to the Encyclopædia Britannica.
