= National Jewish Retreat =

The National Jewish Retreat (NJR) is a six-day Jewish learning and cultural experience organized annually by the Rohr Jewish Learning Institute (JLI). Founded in 2006, it now draws over 1,000 annual participants, making it the largest Jewish retreat in the United States.

Held each August at a high-end hotel across the United States, the retreat offers 120+ concurrent sessions, talks, and workshops led by 50+ scholars, rabbis, entertainers, and public figures alongside kosher dining, concerts, comedy, and children's programming.

The inaugural retreat was held in Copper Mountain, Colorado, and subsequent retreats have been held in Cheyenne Mountain, Colorado; Park City, Utah; Greenwich, Connecticut; Reston, Virginia; Alexandria, Virginia; Chicago, Illinois; Washington, D.C; Palm Desert, California; Stone Mountain, Georgia; and Miami, Florida.

Alongside the main program, the Sinai Scholars Retreat assembles 150 college students each year for a specialized program that includes focused workshops on Jewish identity, leadership, and campus life.

The 2010 retreat became the subject of media interest when former senator George Allen publicly discussed his mother's Jewish heritage for the first time since the rumors were substantiated.

In 2018, Robert Meeropol, the son of Julius and Ethel Rosenberg, spoke at the retreat and celebrated a belated bar mitzvah at age 71.

In 2022, Ben Ferencz, the last surviving Nuremberg prosecutor, presented at age 103, just months before his passing.

In 2024, October 7th survivor Natalie Sanandaji and freed hostage Sapir Cohen shared their harrowing experience at the hands of Hamas terrorists. In 2025, Or Levy, who spent 491 days as a hostage in Gaza, shared his story in a session with Rabbi Pinchas Allouche.

== Scholars in residence ==
Speakers have included Rabbis Yisroel Meir Lau, Adin Steinsaltz, Yoel Kahn, Manis Friedman, Simon Jacobson, Yossi Jacobson, Doron Perez, David Bashevkin, Dr. Edward Reichman, Dr. Jacob Immanuel Schochet, as well as professors Jonathan Sarna, Lawrence Schiffman, Henry Abramson, psychologist Lisa Miller, and many others.

The retreat has also featured numerous performing artists including Dudu Fisher, Peter Himmelman, Alex Clare, Shulem Lemmer, Avraham Fried, and Mordechai Ben David, as well as comedians such as Elon Gold, Robert Cait, and Avi Liberman.

Previous scholars in residence include:

- Rabbi Benjamin Blech, New York, New York
- Richard Blumenthal, Hartford, Connecticut
- Dr. Erica Brown, Silver Spring, Maryland
