= François Nau =

French Catholic priest, mathematician, Syriacist and specialist in oriental languages

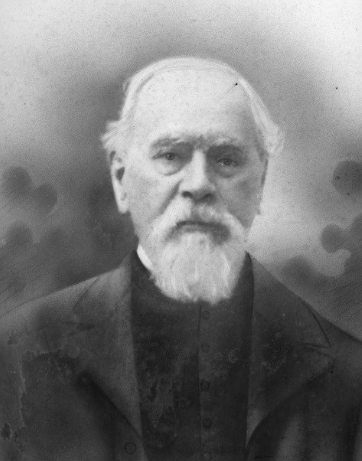
- Born: May 13, 1864; Thil, Meurthe-et-Moselle, France
- Died: September 2, 1931 (aged 67); Paris, France

François Nau (13 May 1864 at Thil – 2 September 1931 at Paris) was a French Catholic priest, mathematician, Syriacist, and specialist in oriental languages. He published a great number of eastern Christian texts and translations for the first and often only time.

== Life ==
François-Nicolas Nau was born in Lorraine, France, as the last of five children of François-Nicolas Nau and Marguerite Longueville. He attended primary school at Longwy until 1878, then the "petit séminaire" of Notre-Dame des Champs at Paris, then the "Grand Séminaire de Saint-Sulpice" in 1882. In 1887 he gained his baccalaureate in theology and canon law. On 17 December 1887 he was ordained priest in the diocese of Paris.

Nau then studied mathematics and physics. After this, from 1889 he studied the Syriac language. In 1895 he gained the diploma of the École pratique des hautes études in Paris by publishing the Syriac text and a French translation of a treatise on astronomy by Bar Hebraeus. In 1897 he received a doctorate of science.

In 1899, together with René Graffin (1858–1941) he founded the series Patrologia Orientalis, intended to complement the Greek and Latin patrologies of Migne.

Starting in 1890, Nau taught mathematics and astronomy for 40 years at the Institut Catholique de Paris. In 1927 he was appointed to a teaching post for Syriac at the École pratique des hautes études. In 1928 he became the "doyen" of the Ecole des Sciences. He died in 1931.

He published over 250 books and articles. A compilation of these in book form was under discussion in 2007.

== Selected publications ==
A complete list of Nau's publications can be found in an appendix to the article by Brière, Journal Asiatique n° 233, pages 153-180

- Littérature cosmographique syriaque inédite. Notice sur le Livre des trésors de Jacques de Bartela, évêque de Tagrit, in: JA, 9.série, 7, 1896, 286–331;
- Thèses présentées à la Faculté des Sciences de Paris pour obtenir le grade de Docteur ès sciences mathématiques.

1st thesis: Formation et extinction du clapotis. 2nd thesis: Propositions données par la Faculté, 1897;

- Une biographie inédite de Bardesane l'astrologue (154-222), tirée de l'Histoire de Michel le Grand, patriarche d'Antioche (1126–1199), 1897;
- Bardesane l'astrologue. Le Livre des lois des pays. Texte syriaque et traduction française, 1899, 19312;
- Opuscules maronites, in: ROC 4, 1899, 175–225. 318–353. 543–571; 5, 1900, 74–98. 293–302;
- Le Livre de l'ascension de l'esprit sur la forme du ciel et de la terre. Cours d'astronomie rédigé en 1279 par Grégoire Aboulfarag, dit Bar Hebraeus, I re partie: Texte syriaque, 1899; II e partie: Traduction française, 1900 (BEHE 121);
- Le texte grec des récits du moine Anastase sur les saints Pères du Sinaï, in: Or Chr 2, 1902, 58–89;
- Dans quelle mesure les Jacobites sont-ils monophysites ?, in: ROC 10, 1905, 113–134;
- Recueil de monographies. I. Histoires d'Açoudemmeh et de Marouta, métropolitains jacobites de Tagrit et de l'Orient (VIe et VIIe siècles), suivies du traité d'Açoudemmeh sur l'homme. Textes syriaques inédits publiés, traduits et annotés, in: PO 3, 1905, 1–120; Lettres choisies de Jacques d'Édesse, publiées et traduites, 1906; Ancienne littérature canonique syriaque, fasc. II. Les canons et les résolutions canoniques de Rabboula, Jean de Tella, Cyriaque d'Amid, Jacques d'Édesse, Georges des Arabes, Cyriaque d'Antioche, Jean III, Théodose d'Antioche et des Perses, traduits pour la première fois en français, 1906;
- Histoires des solitaires égyptiens (ms. Coislin 126, fol. 158 à fol. 256), in: ROC 12, 1907, 43–69. 171–189. 393–413; 13, 1908, 47–66. 266–297; 14, 1909, 357–379; 17, 1912, 204–211. 294–301; 18, 1913, 137–146;
- Analyse du traité écrit par Denys bar Salibi contre les Nestoriens, in: ROC 14, 1909, 298–320;
- Documents pour l'étude de la Bible. Histoire et Sagesse d'Açikar l'Assyrien (fils d'Anaël, neveu de Tobie). Traduction des versions syriaques avec les principales différences des versions arabe, arménienne, grecque, néo-syriaque, slave et roumaine, 1909;
- Saint Cyrille et Nestorius. Contribution à l'histoire des origines des schismes monophysite et nestorien, in: ROC 15, 1910, 365–391; 16, 1911, 1-54;
- Recueil de monographies. III. Les légendes syriaques d'Aaron de Saroug, de Maxime et Domèce, d'Abraham, maître de Barsôma, et de l'empereur Maurice. Texte syriaque édité et traduit, in: PO 5, 1910, 693–778. 804–807;
- Nestorius. Le Livre d'Héraclide de Damas, traduit en français (avec le concours du R. P. Bedjan et de M. Brière), suivi du texte grec des trois homélies de Nestorius sur les tentations de Notre-Seigneur et de trois appendices: Lettre à Cosme, présents envoyés d'Alexandrie, lettre de Nestorius aux habitants de Constantinople, 1910;
- Recueil de monographies. IV. Jean Rufus, évêque de Maïouma. Plérophories, témoignages et révélations contre le concile de Chalcédoine. Version syriaque et traduction française, in: PO 8, 1911, 1–208;
- Nestorius, d'après les sources orientales, 1911;
- Ancienne littérature canonique syriaque, fasc. I. La Didascalie des douze apôtres, traduite du syriaque pour la première fois. Deuxième édition revue et augmentée de la traduction de la Didachê des douze apôtres, de la Didascalie de l'apôtre Adaï et des empêchements de mariage (pseudo-) apostoliques, 1912 (1. Aufl. 1902);
- Documents pour servir à l'histoire de l'Eglise nestorienne. La seconde partie de l'Histoire de Barçadbešabba `Arbaïa et controverse de Théodore de Mopsueste avec les Macédoniens. Textes syriaques édités et traduits, in: PO 9, 1913, 489-677;
- Martyrologes et ménologes orientaux, I-XIII. Un martyrologe et douze ménologes syriaques édités et traduits, in: PO 10, 1915, 1-164;
- Deux textes de Bar Hébraeus sur Mahomet et le Coran, in: JA 211, 1927, 311-329; A propos d'un feuillet d'un manuscrit arabe. La mystique chez les Nestoriens. Religion et mystique chez les musulmans, in: Museon 43, 1930, 85-116. 221-262;
- Documents pour servir à l'histoire de l'Église nestorienne. La première partie de l'Histoire de Barçadbešabba `Arbaïa. Texte syriaque édité et traduit, in: PO 23, 1932, 177-343;

In the "Bibliothèque de l'Ecole des Hautes Etudes":

- N° 121: Bar Hebraeus, "Sur la forme du ciel et de la terre" (cours d'astronomie, 1279)

In the "Bibliothèque Hagiographique Orientale"

- N° 2 : Vie de Jean Bar Aphtonia,

In the "Patrologia Orientalis" series:

- N° 11 (= III, 1): Histoire d'Ahoudemmeh; Histoire de Marouta de Tagrit; Traité d'Ahoudemmeh sur l'homme.
- N° 19 (= IV, 4):Histoire de St Pacome. Histoire de Jean Baptiste attribuée à l'Evangéliste Marc.
- N° 25 (= V, 5) : Légende syriaque d'Aaron de Saroug, Légende de Maxime et Domèce, Légende d'Abraham et de Maurice.
- N° 36 (= VIII, 1): Jean de Maiouma, Plérophories contre Chalcédoine.
- N° 45 (= IX, 5): Barhadbesabba Arbaia, Histoire ecclésiastique (2) (Sur Nestorius...). Théodore de Mopsueste, "Controverse avec les Macédoniens".
- N° 46 (= X, 1): Un martyrologe et douze ménologes syriaques.
- N° 47 (= X, 2): Les ménologes des évangéliaires coptes-arabes.
- N° 55 (= XI, 4): Ammonas, successeur d'Antoine; textes grecs et syriaques.
- N° 63 (= XIII, 2): Pseudo-Chrysostome (Nestorius); "4 Homélies". Textes monophysites. Histoire de Nestorius et conjuration contre la migraine.

In the Revue de l'Histoire des religions:

- Les "belles actions" de Mar Rabboula, évêque d'Edesse.

== Sources ==
- "L'abbé François NAU", by Maurice Brière. Published in the Journal asiatique of the Société Asiatique. Vol. ccxxiii Paris 1933 at Gallica starting at page 149
