= Rohr Jewish Learning Institute =

Series of Jewish adult education courses

- Established: 1999
- Headquarters: 832 Eastern Parkway, Brooklyn, New York
- Coordinates: 40.668988°N 73.941176°W
- Director: Rabbi Efraim Mintz
- Affiliations: Merkos L'Inyonei Chinuch
- Website: myjli.com

The Rohr Jewish Learning Institute (JLI) is a division of Merkos L'Inyonei Chinuch, the educational arm of the Chabad-Lubavitch Orthodox Jewish Hasidic dynasty. It offers adult Jewish courses on Jewish history, law, ethics, philosophy and rabbinical literature worldwide. It also develops Jewish studies curricula specifically for women, college students, teenagers, and seniors.

In 2014, the organization claimed there were 117,500 people enrolled in JLI. The JLI model combines a research-based approach with instructional design, aiming to present traditional Jewish teachings in a contemporary academic framework. Its headquarters are located in the Crown Heights area of Brooklyn, New York City.

== History ==
JLI was founded in 1998. The first JLI course, Jewish Mysticism, was piloted at fifteen Chabad centers in 1999. The institute expanded thereafter with controlled growth, introducing the learning program to between fifteen and twenty new cities annually until 2005 when JLI added forty new cities. Since its inception in 1998, over 500,000 students have completed JLI courses, with enrollment of 12,000 to 16,000 students each semester. By 2010, JLI had developed 37 separate six-week courses, the most popular of which have been on the topics of Jewish thought, law, and mysticism.

In 2005, JLI launched its Torah Studies division, which is currently active in 248 communities around the world, and piloted its first JLI Teens curriculum.

In 2005, JLI materials were translated into Spanish. In 2011, a curriculum in Hebrew was developed and piloted in ten Israeli cities. There are currently thirty JLI locations in Israel as well as classes in Hebrew throughout the world in communities with large concentrations of Israeli ex-pats. The Russian language division was added in 2012 and currently consists of forty chapters throughout the former CIS. JLI course materials were developed in German the same year, and are taught in five cities in Germany.

By 2013, 382 chapters in twenty-four countries and thirty-one U.S. states offered JLI courses. This grew to over 400 chapters in twenty-eight countries by 2022, and over 900 communities as of 2024.

== Courses ==
A network of JLI's affiliated local chapters offers courses to the Jewish communities. JLI's flagship courses consist of six weekly sessions and each class unit is taught concurrently at all of its locations.

Specific JLI courses are accredited to offer Continuing Legal Education credits by the bar associations of 31 U.S. states, in various Canadian provinces, Australia, and the UK, as well as the Order of Flemish Bar Associations, and South Africa's National Board of Licenses. When appropriate, JLI courses are accredited by the AMA's ACCME Accreditation Council for Continuing Medical Education for Continuing Medical Education credits, as well as by the Washington School of Psychiatry and the American Psychological Association.

JLI was commissioned by the family of former Israeli Prime Minister, Yitzhak Shamir, to develop a series of lunch-hour educational classes to be offered in corporate offices in Israel.

== Departments ==
In addition to the flagship course offerings, JLI has branched out to offer the following programs geared towards specific segments of the community.

=== Torah Studies ===
The Torah Studies department develops weekly classes taught year-round on Torah portions corresponding to those read in synagogues each Sabbath. Geared towards students seeking ongoing Torah study, lessons focus on relevant life issues such as personal growth, business ethics, social responsibilities, personal relationships and the environment.

==== Machon Shmuel ====
In 2013, Machon Shmuel: The Sami Rohr Research Institute—a "Torah Think Tank" under the auspices of The Rohr Jewish Learning Institute—was already providing services to many shluchim throughout the world.

=== JLI Teens ===
The first teen-focused JLI course was held in 2009. JLI Teens courses aim to make Judaism relevant to teens and to forge a new generation of Jewish leadership. Teens are engaged with a series of comprehensive courses on issues they contemplate and provide a safe place for discussion on topics such as suicide, personal ethics and values, anti-Semitism, purpose in life, relationships, faith and reason, social justice, leadership, and Israel.

A few select teens in each chapter who demonstrate leadership qualities are invited to join the JLI Teens International Internship Program. The interns' role includes participating in joint conference calls to share ideas, providing early feedback and suggestions to course developers, and partaking in special contests and activities. JLI Teens is offered in seventy cities throughout the United States, Canada, South America, Russia, South Africa, China, Europe and the Middle East.

=== Sinai Scholars ===
The Sinai Scholars Society, introduced on three college campuses in 2006, is an integrated fellowship program for students on college campuses comprising Torah study, social activities, and national networking opportunities. The eight-part curriculum addresses essentials in Judaism, introducing students to the contemporary significance of Jewish life. Students submit an academic paper on Jewish thought, and participate in community and holiday events. Sinai Scholars is offered in partnership with Chabad on Campus at 185 universities, including Ivy League, state and private universities as of 2024.

The Sinai Scholars Society sponsors an annual Students and Scholars Academic Symposium. A selected group of university students from across the country present papers on the modern-day relevance of core Jewish ideas and beliefs, the author of the winning paper is awarded a cash prize. At the Symposium students mingle with Jewish scholars in the academic community and connect with peers from other campuses.

=== Rosh Chodesh Society ===
JLI's women's studies division, The Rosh Chodesh Society (RCS), was founded in 2009 in memory of Rivka Holtzberg, the Chabad emissary who, along with her husband, Gavriel Holtzberg, was a victim of a terror attack in Mumbai, India. Its debut course, Rivka's Tent, was a seven-part series of text-based study of the three commandments addressed specifically to Jewish women. RCS has affiliates in over 150 communities around the world.

=== Torah Café ===
In 2009, JLI created Torah Café, a website offering lectures, workshops, and inspiration from its library. The videos cover a broad range of topics available including academic study of Torah, language, Jewish literature, Jewish history, biographies of Jewish personalities, Jewish music and ethics.

=== National Jewish Retreat ===
JLI sponsors a six-day annual retreat, The National Jewish Retreat, which features live lectures and interactive workshops on Jewish life, law, history, culture and tradition, led by scholars and experts in their various fields of study. The annual retreat is hosted each summer at a hotel, and it provides gourmet Kosher cuisine and entertainment.

In 2013, the Retreat launched the annual Jewish Medical Ethics Conference, which features interactive discussions between participating physicians and Jewish medical ethicists on current and emerging quandaries in the field. The conference is accredited by CME.

=== The Land and The Spirit Israel Experience ===
Responding to nationwide demand from students participating in the fall 2007 course on Israel, The Land and the Spirit, JLI launched its first Israel Experience in March 2008. The bi-annual tour presents an insider look at Israel. In addition to visiting historic and religious sites, participants meet with Israeli politicians and decision-makers, Torah scholars and local residents. Participants bring messages of support from their home communities in the diaspora to the IDF and to families of victims of violence. To date, a total of 2,500 Jews from the diaspora have joined JLI's Israel Experience.

== Kohelet Foundation Partnership ==
Since the fall of 2010, JLI has been a provider of adult Jewish education through the Kohelet Fellowships program, a two-year Jewish learning experience for parents of Jewish day school students. Fellows study Jewish texts, either in courses or one-on-one, participate in community learning events, and explore the lessons with their families. Fellows receive tuition breaks from their children's schools funded by grants from the Kohelet Foundation and its financial partners. Courses on Judaism and study partners for the participating parents are arranged by JLI and Yeshiva University's Center for a Jewish Future.

== Instructor training ==
The JLI Academy provides ongoing training to its affiliated instructors in pedagogy and in-depth study of subjects relating to curriculum content. The Academy organizes an annual conference, intermittent webinars, podcasts, interactive instruction and one-to-one training opportunities. The JLI Academy also serves as a forum of discussion between the curriculum development team and affiliates. The Academy acts as a sounding board for instructors, and provides guidance.
