= Alice Whealey =

Intellectual historian

Alice Whealey is an independent historian specializing in the intellectual history of Europe, she received an M.A. in history in 1988, a M.A. in Demography in 1992, and Ph.D. in history in 1998 from U.C. Berkeley.

In 2003 she published Josephus on Jesus, The Testimonium Flavianum Controversy from Late Antiquity to Modern Times critically analyzing the Testimonium Flavianum, the disputed passage from Josephus that mentions Jesus Christ. The book was published by Peter Lang Publishing, Inc.

In her article "Pseudo-Justin's De Resurrectione: Athenagoras or Hippolytus?" published in "Vigiliae Christianae" by Brill publishing, she argues that Pseudo-Justin's "de resurrectione" was not composed by Athenagoras, but was more likely by Hippolytus.
