= The Christ Myth =

Book by Arthur Drews

- Author: Arthur Drews
- Original title: Die Christusmythe
- Translator: C. Delisle Burns
- Published: London
- Publication date: 1909
- English publication date: 1910
- Translation: The Christ Myth at Internet Archive

The Christ Myth, first published in 1909, was a book by Arthur Drews on the Christ myth theory. Drews (1865–1935), along with Bruno Bauer (1809–1882) and Albert Kalthoff (1850–1906), is one of the three German pioneers of the denial of the existence of a historical Jesus.

== History ==
=== 19th-century historical criticism ===
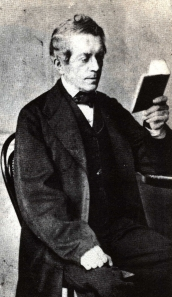
David Strauss

Drews emphatically argues that no independent evidence for the historical existence of Jesus has ever been found outside the New Testament writings. He denounces the Romanticism of the liberal cult of Jesus (Der liberale Jesuskultus) as a violation of historical method, and the naive sentimentalism of historical theology which attributes the formation of Christianity to Jesus's "great personality".

He mentions the key names of historical criticism that emerged in the late 18th century and blossomed in the 19th century in Germany:

- Charles-François Dupuis (1742–1809) and Comte Constantin-François de Volney (1757–1820), the two French critical thinkers of the Enlightenment, who were the first to deny the historicity of Jesus on astromythical grounds, which they saw as key factors in the formation of religions including Christianity.
- David Strauss (1808–1874), who, at 27, pioneered the search for the historical Jesus with his Life of Jesus in 1835 (of 1,400 pages) by rejecting all the supernatural events as mythical elaborations.
- Bruno Bauer (1809–1882), the first academic theologian to affirm the non-historicity of Jesus. He claimed that Mark was the original Gospel, and the inventor of the historicity of Jesus. He traced the impact of major Greco-Roman ideas on the formation of the NT, especially the influence of Stoic philosophy (Seneca the Younger). Bruno Bauer's scholarship was buried by German academia, and he remained a pariah, until Albert Kalthoff rescued him from neglect and obscurity.
- Julius Wellhausen (1844–1918), an expert scholar of the Torah/Pentateuch, who was a leader in historical and source criticism;
- William Wrede (1859–1906), the promoter of the Messianic Secret in Mark, and who confirmed Bruno Bauer's claim that Mark was the real creator of Christianity;
- Johannes Weiss (1863–1914), the first exegete of the Gospels to attribute an apocalyptic vision to Jesus, accepted by Schweitzer and many others. He initiated form criticism later developed by Rudolf Bultmann. Weiss gave the name of Q to the "sayings of the Lord" common to Matthew and Luke. He was considered the highest authority in his time.
- G.J.P.J. Bolland (1854–1922), a Dutch autodidact radical, interested in Hegel and von Hartmann (letters from Drews to Bolland were published in German from 1890 to 1904), who saw the origin of Christianity in syncretism by Hellenized Jews in Alexandria;
- Albert Schweitzer (1875–1965), a historian of theology, who presented an important critical review of the history of the search for Jesus's life in The Quest of the Historical Jesus – From Reimarus to Wrede (1906, first edition), denouncing the subjectivity of the various writers who injected their own preferences in Jesus's character. Schweitzer devotes three chapters to David Strauss (Ch. 7, 8, and 9), and a full chapter to Bruno Bauer (Ch. 11). Ch. 10 discusses the Priority of Mark hypothesis of Christian H. Weisse and Christian G. Wilke advanced in 1838.

=== Consequences of German historical criticism ===
Consequences have been dramatic.

- A general skepticism about the validity of the New Testament: "There is nothing, absolutely nothing, either in the actions or words of Jesus, that has not a mythical character or cannot be traced to parallel passages in the Old Testament or the Talmud. Historical criticism resolves all details of the Gospel story in mythical mist and makes it impossible to say that there ever was such a person" (Ch. 12).
- A loss of substance and meaning in the figure of the "historical Jesus": "But what [a liberal theologian] leaves intact of the personality and story of Jesus is so meagre, and so devoid of solid foundation, that it cannot claim any historical significance." (Ch. 8) The human Jesus of liberal theologians, found by reduction and elimination of supernatural and other unwanted features, is so bloodless that it could have never induced the emotional fervor of a new spiritual movement, let alone a new religion.

=== Syncretism ===
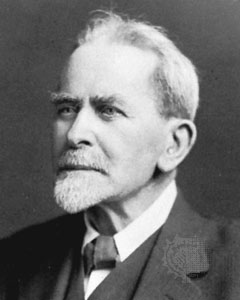
James George Frazer, author of the Golden Bough

Drews uses the new findings of anthropology collected by James Frazer (1854–1941) with his descriptions of ancient pagan religions and the concept of dying-and-rising god. Drews also pays extreme attention to the social environment of religious movements, as he sees religion as the expression of the social soul.

Drews argues that the figure of Christ arose as a product of syncretism, a composite of mystical and apocalyptic ideas:

1. A Savior/Redeemer derived from the major prophets of the Old Testament and their images of:

- the suffering Servant of God (in Isaiah 53),
- the Suffering Victim (in Psalm 22),
- and the personification of Wisdom (in Wisdom of Solomon, Sirach and Proverbs)

2. The concept of Messiah liberator freeing the Jews in Palestine from Roman occupation and taxation.

3. Mixed with the patterns of Persian and Greco-Roman dying-and-rising godmen — godly heroes, kings, and emperors, whose stories inspired the new anthropological concept of dying and rising gods popularized by Frazer – such as Baal, Melqart, Adonis, Eshmun, Attis, Tammuz, Asclepius, Orpheus, Persephone, Inanna, also known as Ishtar, as well as Ra the Sun god, with its fusion with Osiris, Zalmoxis, Dionysus, and Odin, figuring in mystery cults of the Ancient Near East.

==== The Jesus Cult and the Mystery Cults ====
Drews points out the marked similarities of the early Christ cult to the existing and popular mystery cults – a theme already developed by W.B. Smith and J.M. Robertson, and later echoed by Maurice Goguel and reprised by the older brother of G.A. van den Bergh van Eysinga and van Eysinga himself. The rapid diffusion of the Christ religion took place in a population already shaped by and conversant with the sacred features of the mystery cults.

==== Mithras ====
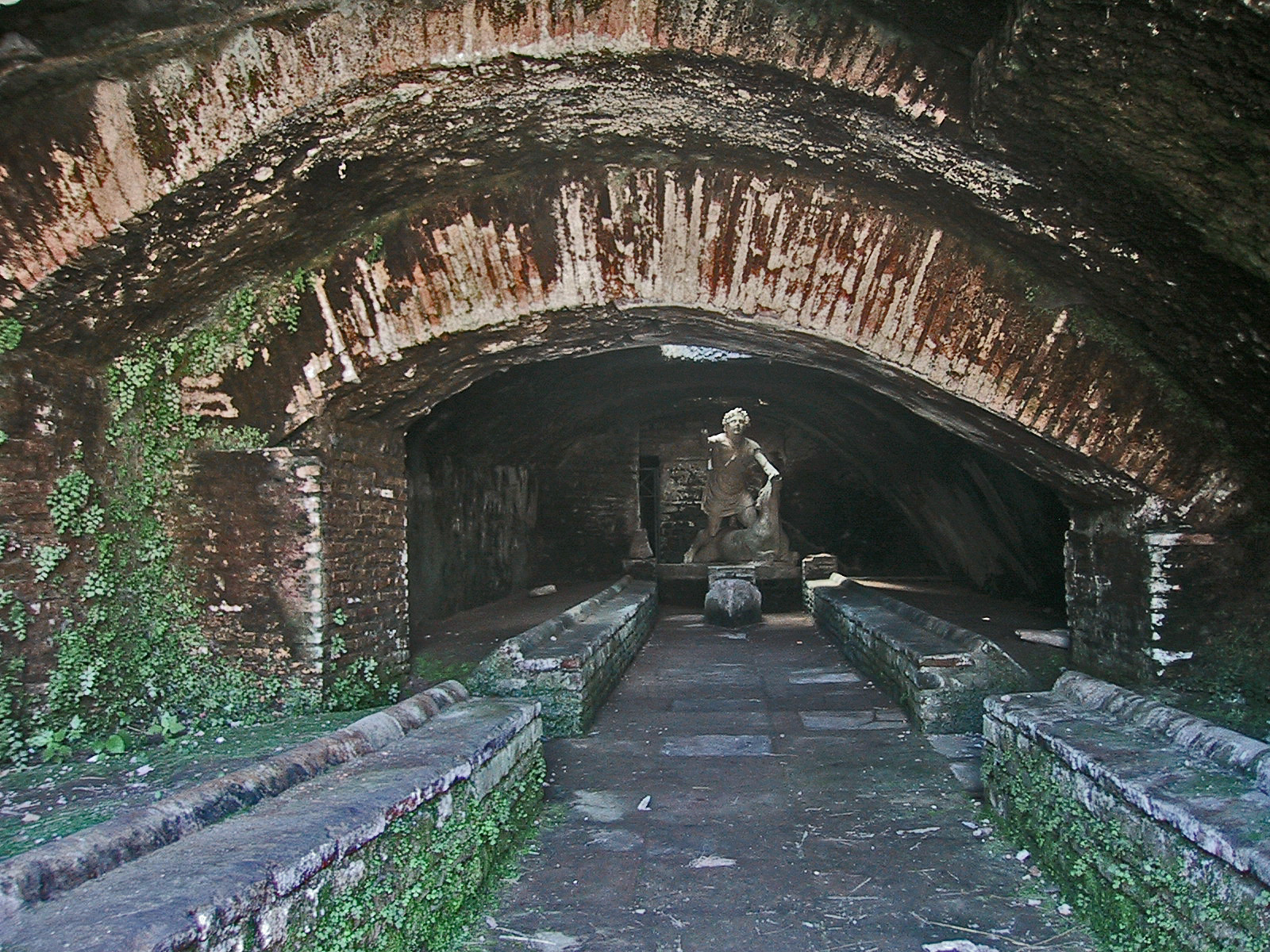
A mithraeum found in the ruins of Ostia Antica, Italy

The Christ Myth is sprinkled with comparisons between the Mithraic mysteries and the cult of Jesus. Although the god Mithras was not exactly a dying-and-rising god, the cults share some meaningful similarities, especially the sacramental feast which allowed the initiated to experience a mystical union with the god.

Mithraism, imported from Persia to Rome, spread rapidly through the Roman Empire in the 1st century, and was considered a certain rival to early Christianity. The major images show the god being born from a rock. The central theme is the hunting and killing a bull with blood gushing out. The sun was portrayed as a friend of Mithras, and banquets with him on the hide of the bull. Females played no part in the images or the cult. The cult was popular among soldiers, and was likely spread by them.
Few initiates came from the social elite, until the revival in the mid-4th century (Emperor Julian). Drews claims that the figure of Jesus seemed more concrete, his story more moving, and it appealed more to women and the underdogs of society. The premature death of Emperor Julian was one of the causes of the Jesus mystery eventually winning over the Mithraic mysteries.

=== Christianity and the historical personality of Jesus ===
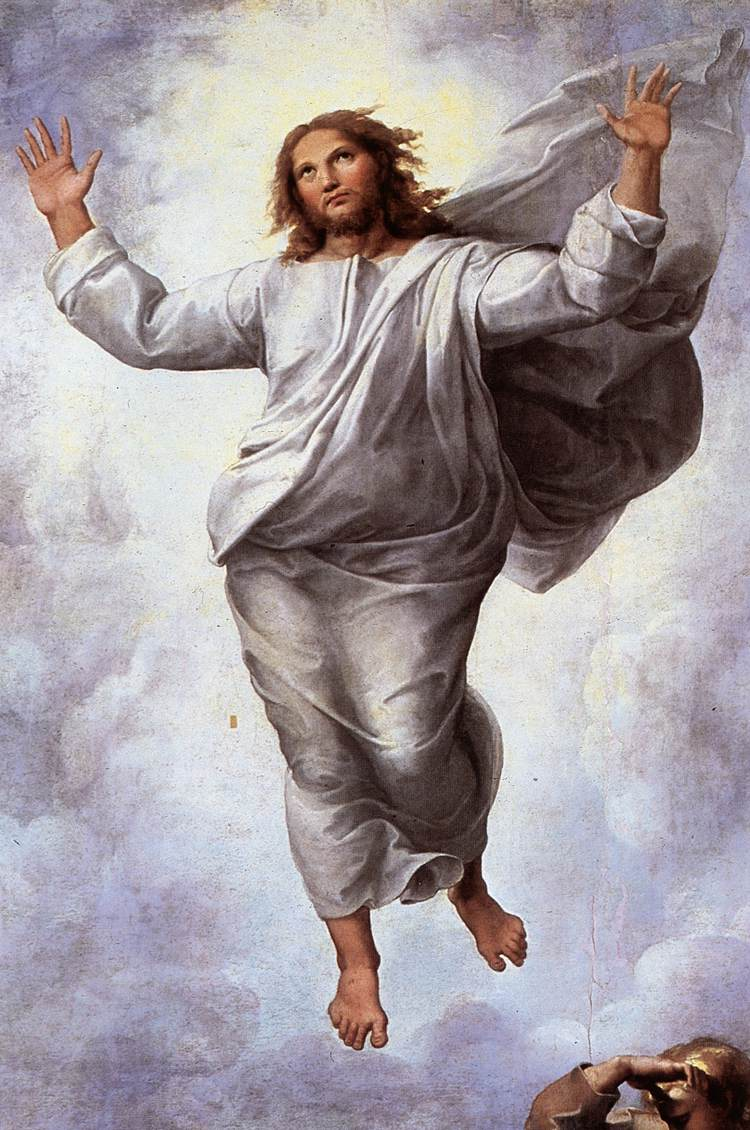
Raphaël, The Transfiguration, 1520, Vatican

Drews asserted that everything about the story of Jesus had a mythical character, and that it was therefore not necessary to presuppose that a historical Jesus had ever existed. In fact, Christianity could have developed without Jesus, but not without Paul, and certainly not without Isaiah.

Drews concludes in the last chapter, "The Religious Problem of the Present":

The Christ-faith arose quite independently of any historical personality known to us;... Jesus was in this sense a product of the religious social soul and was made by Paul, with the required amount of reinterpretation and reconstruction, the chief interest of those communities founded by him. The historical Jesus is not earlier but later than Paul; and as such he has always existed merely as an idea, as a pious fiction in the minds of members of the community...the Gospels are the derivatives...for the propaganda of the Church, and being without any claim to historical significance...[Religion] is a group-religion...the connection of the religious community...[Our personal religion], a religion of the individual, a principle of personal salvation, would have been an offense and an absurdity to the whole of ancient Christendom. [emphasis added]

== Christ Myth II – the witnesses to the historicity of Jesus (1912) ==
The Witnesses to the Historicity of Jesus
- Author: Arthur Drews
- Original title: Die Christusmythe II: Die Zeugnisse für die Geschichtlichkeit Jesu, eine Antwort an die Schriftgelehrten
- Translator: Joseph McCabe
- Published: London & Chicago
- Publication date: 1911
- English publication date: 1912
- Translation: The Witnesses to the Historicity of Jesus at Wikisource

=== Critique of circular historical theology ===
Arthur Drews published a second part to his book, Die Christusmythe II: "Die Zeugnisse für die Geschichtlichkeit Jesu" (1911), to answer objections of scholars and critically examine the historical method of theologians. Joseph McCabe (1867–1955), who started life as a Roman Catholic priest, produced a translation of Christ Myth II as The Witnesses to the Historicity of Jesus (1912), published both in London and Chicago.

==== Historicity of Jesus ====
The preface of this classic book states: "The question of the historicity of Jesus [die Frage nach der Historizität von Jesus Christus] is a purely historical question to be settled with the resources of historical research."

In Ch. 3, "The Methods of Historical Criticism" of Part IV, "The Witness of the Gospels", Drews denounces the unscientific methodology principles of theological history which have been used in Schweitzer's The Quest for the Historical Jesus, the new theological vogue since David Strauss (1808–1874), and resulted in a long string of Lives of Jesus. Drews criticizes historical theology as not respecting the rules of non-Christian historical method, and giving way to "sentimental intuitions" and "basic circularity" of argumentation, where the existence of Jesus is presupposed, but not evidenced by outside sources. He takes as example the case of Johannes Weiss:

[C]ritics are convinced of the historicity of the gospels a priori, before investigating the subject...[They only have] to seek the "historical nucleus" in tradition...How is it that Weinel knows the [innermost nature] of Jesus so well before beginning his inquiry that he thinks he can determine by this test what is spurious in tradition and what is not?...The gospels, it seems, are to be understood from "the soul of Jesus", not from the soul of their authors!..Johannes Weiss... acknowledges that in all his inquiries he starts with the assumption that the gospel story in general has an historical root, that it has grown out of the soil of the life of Jesus, goes back to eye-witnesses of his life, and comes so near to him that we may count upon historical reminiscences...There is a further principle, that all that seems possible... may at once be set down as actual... [This is how] all theological constructions of the life of Jesus are based... the historicity of which is supposed to have been proved by showing that they are possible... Johannes Weiss is a master in...[this] way of interpreting the miracles of Jesus... If any one ventures to differ from him, Weiss bitterly retorts: "Any man who says that these religious ideas and emotions are inconceivable had better keep his hand off matters of religious history; he has no equipment to deal with them" [A classical response of theologians to skeptics.]...[In] Weiss's Das älteste Evangelium...he tries to prove that... Mark is merely incorporating an already existing tradition. "Not without certain assumptions", he admits, "do we set about the inquiry..." [emphasis added]

Drews, like Schweitzer in his Quest, focuses mostly on German liberal theologians, while mentioning Ernest Renan (1823–1892) only en passant. He completely ignores Baron d'Holbach (1723–1789), the first to publish a critical Life of Jesus, with his Ecce Homo! (Histoire critique de Jésus-Christ, ou Analyse raisonnée des évangiles) (1770).

=== The Jewish witnesses ===
- Philo: a Jewish contemporary of Jesus, knew of the Essenes, but makes no mention of Jesus or Christians.
- Justus of Tiberias: Drews mentions the curious case of Photius, the 9th-century Patriarch of Constantinople, who became famous for his Bibliotheca or Myriobiblon, a collection of excerpts and summaries of some 280 classical volumes now mostly lost. Photius read through the Chronicle of Justus of Tiberias, a contemporary of Josephus, who went through the Jewish Wars and the destruction of Jerusalem. Justus wrote a book about the War, and a Chronicle of the Jewish people from Moses to Agrippa II (27-c. 94 AD). "Photius himself believed there ought to be some mention of Jesus [in Justus's Chronicle], and was surprised to find none." [emphasis added]
- Josephus: pros and cons of the Testimonium Flavanium, concluding it is most likely an interpolation or alteration.
- Talmud: offers no contemporary report on Jesus, only later fragments from the Gospel tradition.

=== The Roman witnesses ===
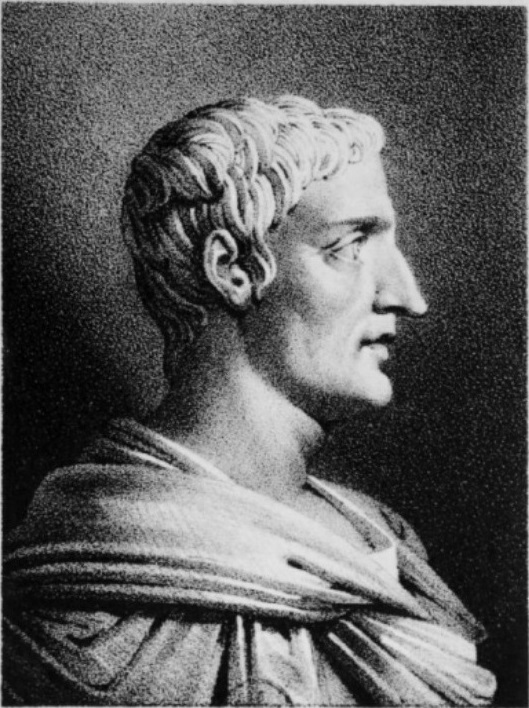
Tacitus, historian of Annals

- Pliny the Younger (61-c. 112 AD): his letter to Trajan of c. 110 AD (X, 96) only mentions the existence of a cult of Christians with an innocent early-morning ritual. This letter has aroused the suspicion of Bruno Bauer and Edwin Johnson.
- Suetonius (69–122 AD): the expulsion of Jews, making trouble at the instigation of an enigmatic Chrestus (impulsore Chresto), not spelled Christus, under Emperor Claudius leaves uncertain who Chrestus was, and does not support the historicity of a Jesus.
- Tacitus (56–117 AD): Next to Josephus, is host to the second most important non-Christian passage in Annals, XV, 44 (c. 115 AD). Nero lays the blame for the 64 AD fire of Rome on Christianos, followers of Christus, whose death was ordered by Pontius Pilate in Judaea, who is mentioned as procurator instead of prefect. This passage has given rise to an intense examination of pros and cons. Jesus, as a name, is not mentioned; Christianos seems to be a correction of an original Chrestianos; the persecution of Christians by Nero is doubtful, mentioned only in Sulpicius Severus (c. 400), whose text could have been interpolated back into Tacitus; Tacitus's source must have been, not the archives, but hearsay from Christians. The strange circumstances of the discovery of the manuscript in the 15th century also raised questions. A discussion on the authenticity of the Annals passage remains inconclusive.
- Lucus a non Lucendo, no evidence can be deduced from the destroyed pagan manuscripts.

=== The witness of Paul ===
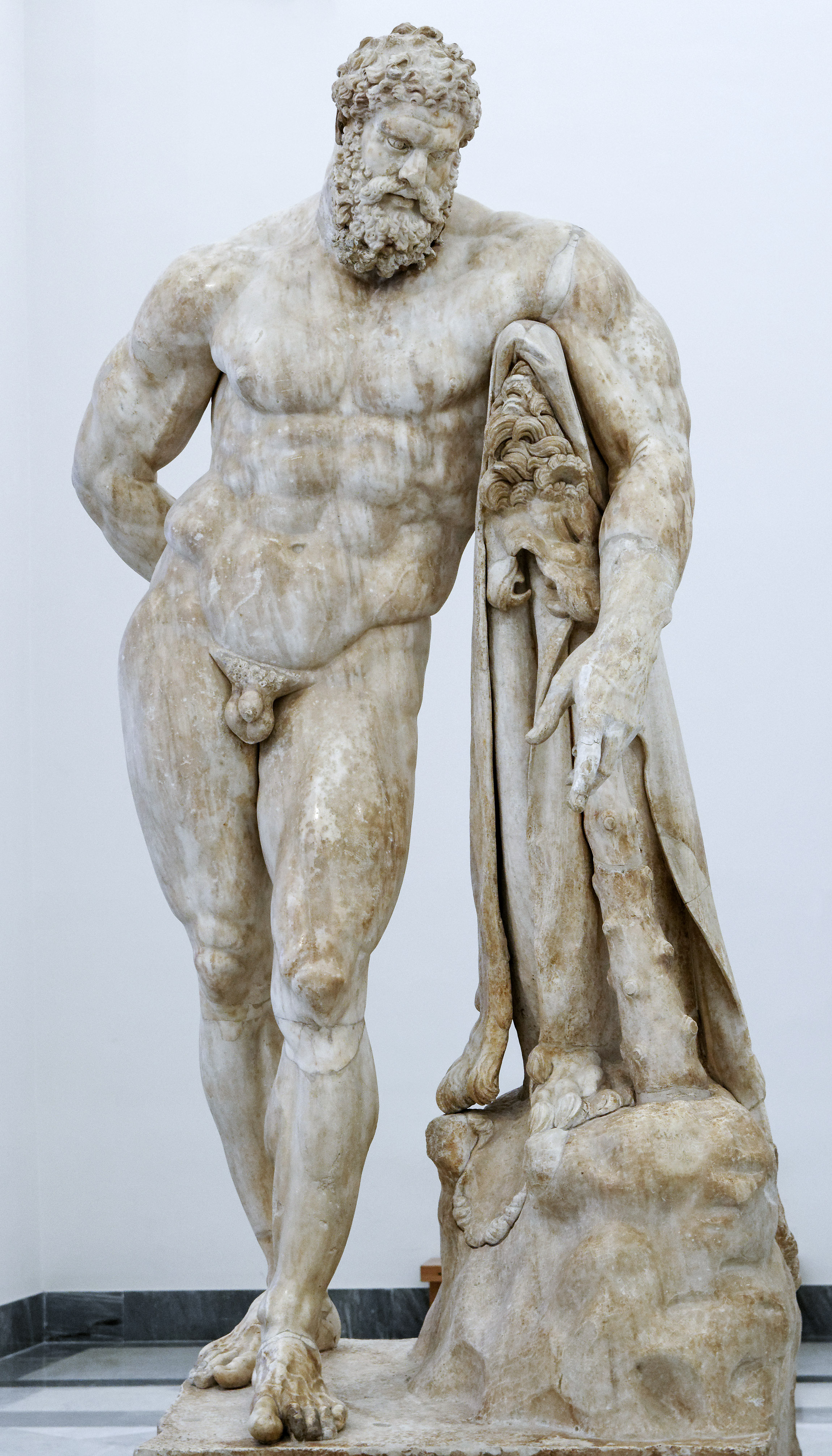
Farnese Hercules, a Roman copy from Lysippos Herakles (Naples)

The Epistles of Paul, and doubts about their authenticity: [The first ten epistles of Paul of Tarsus appeared around 140 AD, collected in Marcion's Apostolikon. Their lost text was reconstituted by Adolf von Harnack in Marcion: The Gospel of the Alien God, 1921]

The leader of the Tübingen School of theology, Ferdinand Christian (F.C.) Baur (1792–1860), in Paulus, der Apostel Jesu Christi (1845), had established as genuine the four chief Pauline Epistles — Romans, Galatians, First Corinthians and Second Corinthians — and that Paul in the Acts was different from the Paul of the Epistles.

Drews stresses that in the Germany of the 1900s, the genuineness of those four chief "Paulinae" (i.e. Paul's Epistles) "is so firmly held by [theologians] that any doubt about it is at once rejected by them as not to be taken seriously." This fear didn't stop from doubts the likes of:

- Bruno Bauer, the first to declare all Paul's epistles to be 2nd-century forgeries;
- the English radicals Edwin Johnson, John M. Robertson, Thomas Whittaker;
- the Dutch radicals G.J.P.J. Bolland, Willem C. Van Manen (with two key articles in English on "Paul & Paulinism" and Romans, and G.A. van den Bergh van Eysinga, all belonging to the famous Dutch Radical School, whose specialty was radical criticism of the Paulinae and denial of their authenticity;
- and Albert Kalthoff who revived Bruno Bauer's ideas and gave them a new shine.

Drews says it loud and clear: There's a vicious circle of methodology in historical theologians, and if they find Jesus, it's because they assume in advance he's already in the stories.

1. Proofs of the Historicity of Jesus in Paul

(a) Simple Proofs:

The Savior has to appear to be a real man. The law (Halakha) did not make men righteous, and so Jesus Christ was despatched to free men from the law, redeem them and deliver them from sin and death by his own sacrificial death. By his union with Christ, man becomes dead to the law and gains eternal life. Philo's Logos is a similar divine savior and mediator.
Blended with the Liberator Messiah (who has to descend from David), the fusion results in a Suffering, Dying and Rising God. But this Mediator/Savior has to appear as a real man before his sacrifice — born of a woman under the law (Gal. 4:4) (a Jewish expression).
The idea of a son of God sent as mediator to benefit mankind and confer redemption is abundant in Ancient Greek stories (Herakles, Dionysos), and Ancient Near East mysteries (Attis, Adonis, Osiris). Same idea in the Son of Man of the prophet Daniel. The God figure is linked to the cycle of nature and sun periodicity. Paul enlarged and deepened the idea. Gal. 4:1. The mention of the twelve in 1 Cor. 15:5 is a gloss.

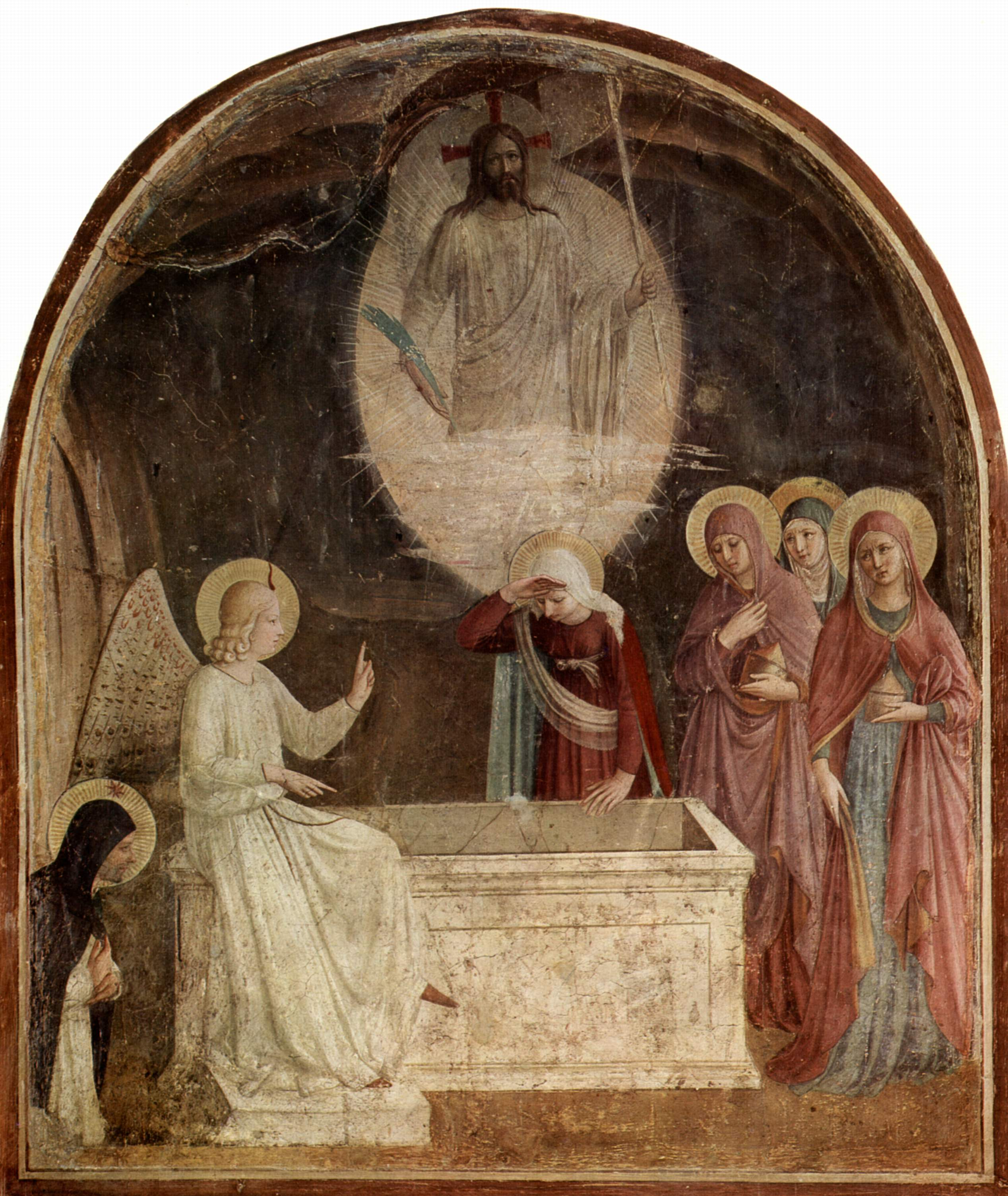
Women at the empty tomb, by Fra Angelico, 1437–1446

(b) The Appearances of the Risen Christ.

About the "visions" in 1 Cor. 15: Is the whole episode fashioned according to the Scriptures? And the mention that Jesus resurrected appeared to more than 500 brothers seems an interpolation.

(c) The account of the Last Supper.

1 Cor. 11:23, has a suspicious liturgical form, while Mark and Matthew's accounts differ, and the phrase "in memory of me" is seen by many as a later interpolation. The betrayal by Judas is an invention, with paradidonai not meaning "betray", but "give up", (Isaiah, 53:12), while selecting the "night" for the action is pure stage setting. The preceding text, 1 Cor. 11:17–22, has been dealing with agape, the love-feast of early Christians, to which the text returns. 1 Cor. 27–33.

(d) The "brothers" of the Lord [vs brethren in Christ]

In 1 Cor. 9:5 and Gal. 1:19, has the phrase Brothers of the Lord a physical meaning and is it different from brethren in Christ (spiritual brotherhood in a sect or church)? This is an old controversy, but its conclusion remains obscure. "Missionary journeys" assigned to physical brothers seem highly improbable. James the Just is also called The Brother of the Lord (Gal. 1:19) because he is the most virtuous. Drews finds it impossible to define what kind of man this James is. Identifying who the man is (among the too many Jameses in the texts) remains utterly "hopeless".

(e) The “Words of the Lord.”

[Those are the "sayings" of Jesus, their compilation first called Logia, after Papias of Hierapolis, and renamed the hypothetical "Q source" by Johannes Weiss (1863–1914).] There are many approximate parallels between Paul and Gospel sayings. Prohibition to part with a wife (1 Cor. 7:10 and Matthew 5:32). Making one's living through the Gospel (1 Cor. 9:14 and Matthew 10:10). Parousia in the clouds (1 Thessalonians 4:15 and Mark 13:26) etc. Who borrows from whom? From Paul into Gospels, or the reverse? Those sayings are not all exceptional, including many banal platitudes from Talmud (Romans 2:1 and Matthew 7:1); (Romans 2:19 and Matthew 15:14), etc.

2. Paul no witness to the historicity of Jesus

Paul arguing with Jews, 12th-century champlevé enamel plaque – DISPVUTABAT CV[M] GRECIS (He disputed with the Greeks) REVINCEBAT IV[DEOS] (He refuted the Jews)

Paul was not concerned with the earthly life of Jesus, and his idea of Christ was formed independently of an historical Jesus. Wrede concurs: For Paul, only Jesus's death is important, and it is a "superhistorical" fact for Paul. Paul knew nothing of Jesus. Paul is not the disciple of a historical Jesus. Paul invokes no distinctive acts of the "Lord", no sayings of Jesus, even when it would have been most useful to his own preaching, for instance on the question of the law.

"[I]nstead of doing so, [Paul] uses the most complicated arguments from the Scriptures and the most determined dialectic, when he might have acted so much more simply." [Emphasis added.] Why not, for example, in Gal. 2:11–14 "in order to convince Peter that he is wrong in avoiding the tables of the Gentiles?".

Theologians have a ready-made "psychological" excuse to explain Paul's silence on Jesus' life: The epistles are occasional papers that never have reason to speak expressly about Jesus, as if everything about Jesus had already been communicated orally, and did not need to be repeated in the letters. Even when "[t]hese letters, [are] swarming with dogmatic discussions of the most subtle character", remarks Drews. It's one more excuse that theologians invent to conceal a major difficulty. Paul's Christ does not point to the Jesus of the Gospels.

3. The question of genuineness

Drews examines the question of the authenticity of the Epistles, and the Historicity of Paul and starts with a reminder:

The Pauline Christ is a metaphysical principle, and his incarnation only one in idea, an imaginary element of his religious system. The man Jesus is in Paul the idealised suffering servant of God of Isaiah and the just man of Wisdom an intermediate stage of metaphysical evolution, not an historical personality. [emphasis added]

Not a single trace of Paul has been found in the writings of Philo and Josephus. The Epistle of Clement is not reliable. There's no proof of the existence of the Pauline epistles before Justin. Papias of Hierapolis was also silent about them.

(a) Emotional arguments for the genuineness.

The only tools for analyzing the epistles are internal evidence and philology. Theologians rely on aesthetics, since there's no outside comparison to identify what they perceive as the distinctiveness of style. Theologians also resort to their "feeling" to detect the powerful personality of Paul, the uninventible originality of the epistles, they even claim they can sense his soul.

(b) Arguments for genuineness from the times.

Paul of Tarsus, apostle extraordinaire to the Gentiles

Van Manen showed that the communities visited by Paul were complex organizations, not newly founded and young. They point to the middle of the 2nd century rather than the middle of the 1st. The Gnostic influence is noticeable. Gift of tongues, circumcisions were still issues in the 2nd century. Justin's Trypho showed that the two sides of established Jews versus sectarian Jewish-Christians (Nazarene) were still confronting each other as in Galatians.
Only after the destruction of Jerusalem did Jews and Christians split, turning to enmity and hatred. Later Christians took the side of Romans against the Jews (135). Christians felt they were the new chosen, with a new Covenant, and the Jews had become outcasts and damned. In Romans 9-11 the Jews are excluded from salvation.
Paulinism is very close to the Gnosticism of the 2nd century, Drews emphasizes:

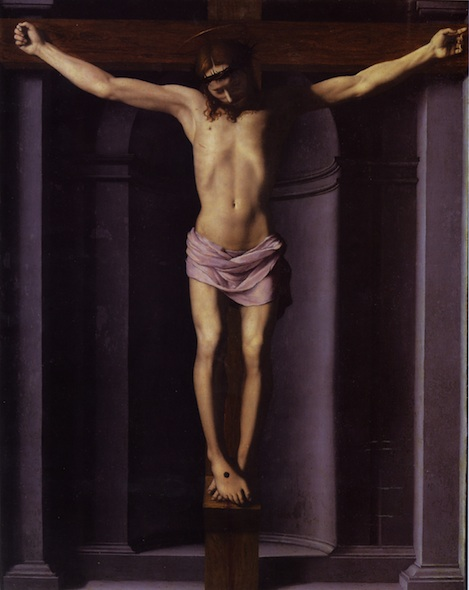
Bronzino's depiction of the Crucifixion with 3 nails, no ropes, and a hypopodium standing support, c. 1545

In one case the connection between Gnosticism and Paul is so evident that it may be cited as a proof that Paul knew nothing of an historical Jesus; it is the passage in 1 Cor. 2:6, where the apostle speaks of the princes of this world, who knew not what they did when they crucified the Lord of glory. It was long ago recognised by van Manen and others that by these princes we must understand, not the Jewish or Roman authorities, nor any terrestrial powers whatever, but the enemies of this world, the demons higher powers, which do indeed rule the earth for a time, but will pass away before the coming triumph of the saviour-God. That is precisely the Gnostic idea of the death of the Redeemer, and it is here put forward by Paul; from that we may infer that he did not conceive the life of Jesus as an historical event, but a general metaphysical drama, in which heaven and earth struggle for the mastery. [emphasis added]

Paul does use a lot of Gnostic language, which was understandable in the 2nd century, but not around 50–60 AD, given as the spurious dating of the Epistles. Not enough time had passed to elaborate and deepen the new thoughts. The Damascus vision is not enough to explain in Paul such a quick turn-around conversion from zealot Jew to fanatic Christian.

(c) The spuriousness of the Pauline Epistles.

Paul's Judaism is highly questionable. Consulted rabbis cannot recognize a student of Judaism in Paul. Paul is constantly referring only to the Septuagint, and there's no clue that he knew any Hebrew. He thinks Greek, speaks Greek, eats Greek, uses Greek in everything. Paulinism is much closer to the Hellenistic Judaism of Philo and Wisdom. Paul never shows any respect for the sacred texts, distorting or changing their meaning, as in Gal. 4:21. His mindset is unique, similar only to other 2nd-century writers, like Hebrews, Barnabas, Justin.
The Epistles and the Acts present two radically different stories (F.C. Baur). The Dutch Radical School (Rudolf Steck and Willem C. van Manen) has mostly denied the authenticity of the Epistles. The Epistles' goal was to separate Christianity from Judaism. Many intriguing scenarios are possible about the character of Paul, a Jew who turned against the law and Judaism, to give freedom to the new cult: one writer, or many? But, for Drews's Christ Myth, the historicity of Paul is secondary.

=== The witness of the Gospels ===
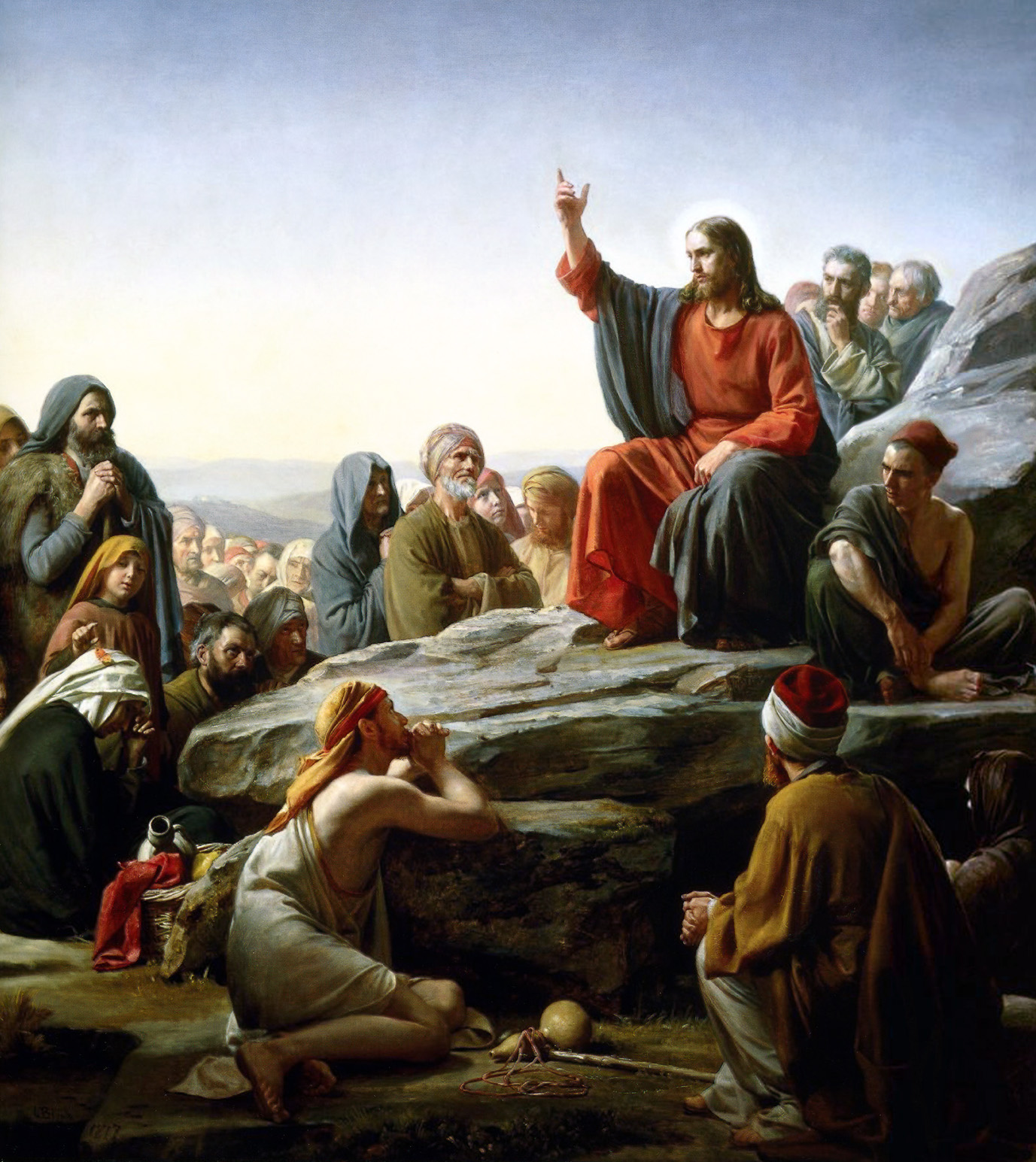
Sermon on the Mount, by Carl Bloch, 1877

This important part IV covers a complete text criticism and historical criticism of Gospel scholarship in 1912, in 14 chapters:

1. The Sources of the Gospels
2. The Witness of Tradition
3. The Methods of Historical Criticism

(a) The Methodical Principles of Theological History
(b) The Method of Johannes Weiss

4. The "Uniqueness" and "Uninventibility" of the Gospel Jesus
5. Schmiedel’s [Nine] Main Pillars
6. The Methods of 'The Christ-Myth'

(a) The Literary Character of the Gospels.
(b) The Mythical Character of the Gospels.

7. The Mythic-Symbolic Interpretation of the Gospels

(a) The Suffering and Exaltation of the Messiah.
(b) The Character and Miracles of the Messiah. — Supplement [On Job]
(c) John the Baptist and the Baptism of Jesus.
(d) The Name of the Messiah.
(e) The Topography of the Gospels.

I. NAZARETH.
II. JERUSALEM.
III. GALILEE.

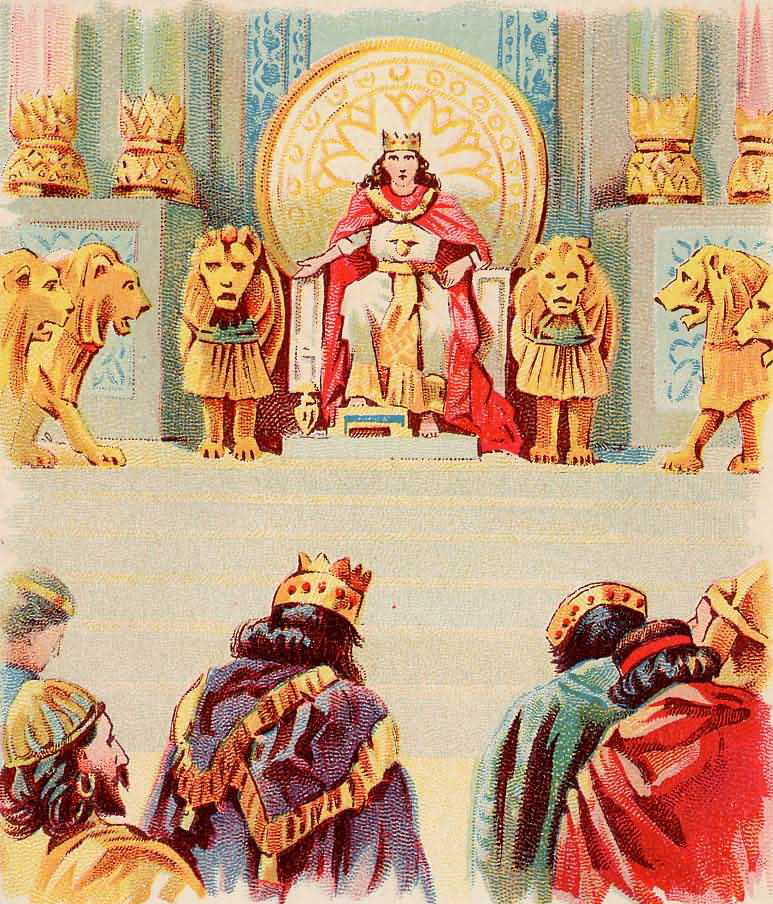
Solomon's Wealth and Wisdom, as in 1 Kings 3:12–13, Bible card, 1896, Providence Lithograph Company

(f) The Chronology of the Gospels.
(g) The Pre-Christian Jesus.
(h) The Conversion of the Mythical into an Historical Jesus.
(i) Jesus and the Pharisees and Scribes.
(k) Further Modifications of Prophetical and Historical Passages.

8. Historians and the Gospels
9. The Words of the Lord [The "Sayings" of Jesus", the "Q source"]

(a) The Tradition of the Words of the Lord.
(b) The Controversies with the Pharisees.
(c) Sayings of Jesus on the Weak and Lowly.
(d) Jesus's Belief in God the Father
(e) Love of Neighbours and of Enemies.
(f) The Sermon on the Mount.
(g) Further Parallel Passages.

10. The Parables of Jesus
11. General Result
12. The "Strong Personality"
13. The Historical Jesus and the Ideal Christ
14. Idea and Personality: Settlement of the Religious Crisis
Appendix [Astral Speculations of the Ancients on Psalm 22]

==== The Suffering Servant of God in Isaiah 53 ====
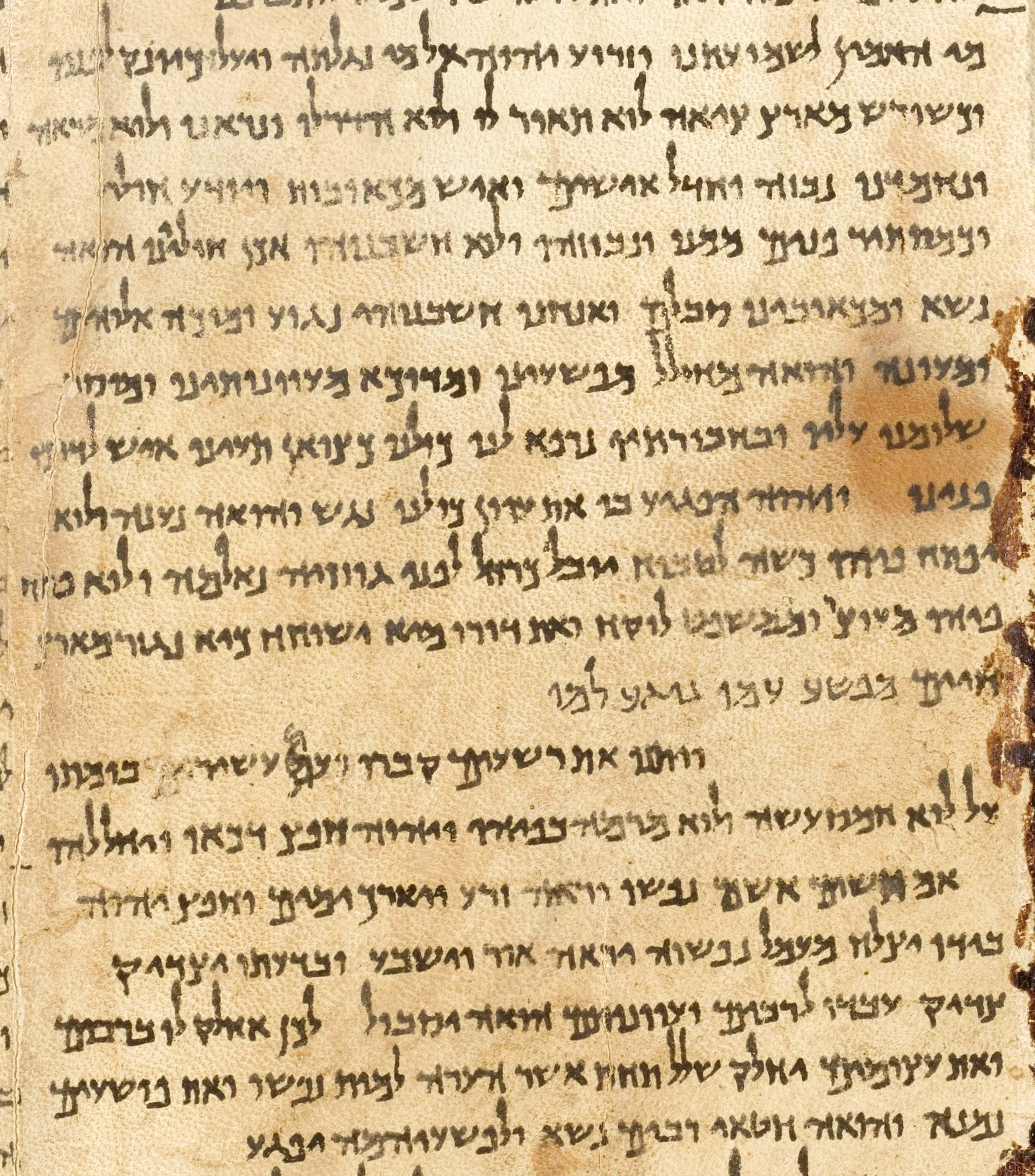
Isaiah 53 in the Great Isaiah Scroll, found at Qumran and dated to the 2nd century BCE

The book emphasized the role played in the formation of the figure of Jesus by the Old Testament character of The Suffering Servant in Isaiah 53, Jeremiah, Job, Zechariah, Ezechiel, etc. especially as presented in the Greek version of the Septuagint. Isaiah 52:13 – 53:12 ESV tells the story of the human scapegoat who, on God's will, is turned into an innocent lamb offered for sacrifice:

3 He was despised and rejected by men; a man of sorrows, and acquainted with grief;... 4 Surely he has borne our griefs and carried our sorrows; yet we esteemed him stricken, smitten by God, and afflicted. 5 But he was pierced for our transgressions; he was crushed for our iniquities; upon him was the chastisement that brought us peace, and with his wounds we are healed. 6 All we like sheep have gone astray; we have turned—every one—to his own way; and the Lord has laid on him the iniquity of us all. 7... yet he opened not his mouth; like a lamb that is led to the slaughter... 8 By oppression and judgment he was taken away; ... stricken for the transgression of my people? 9 And they made his grave with the wicked... although he had done no violence, and there was no deceit in his mouth.10 Yet it was the will of the Lord to crush him... when his soul makes an offering for guilt... 11...by his knowledge shall the righteous one, my servant, make many to be accounted righteous, and he shall bear their iniquities. 12...because he poured out his soul to death and was numbered with the transgressors; yet he bore the sin of many, and makes intercession for the transgressors. [emphasis added]

In ch. 7, "The Mythic-Symbolic Interpretation of the Gospels", Drews writes:

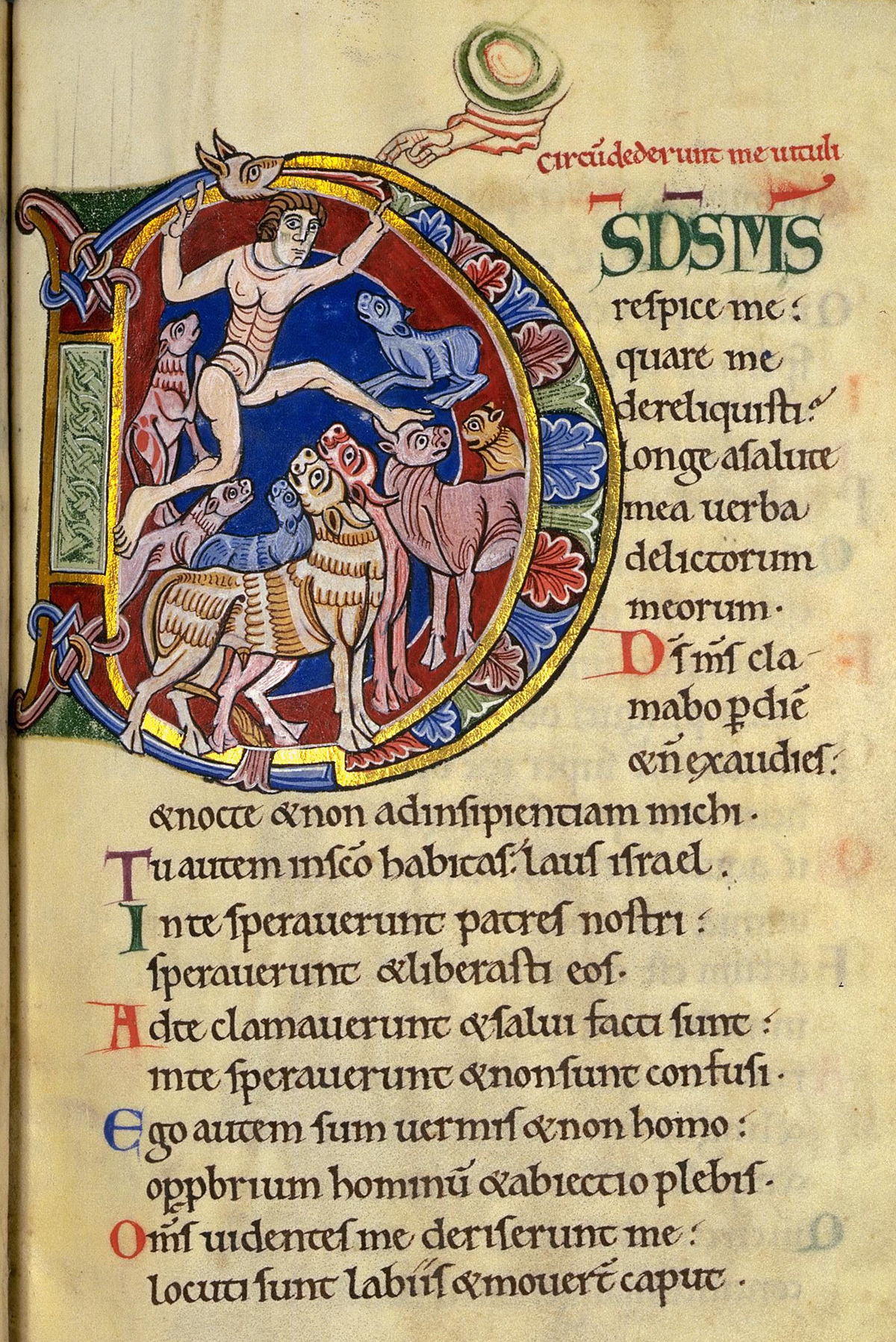
Psalm 22:1–8 in St. Albans Psalter – DS DS MS mean Deus, Deus meus, first words in Latin Vulgate

The mythic-symbolic interpretation of the gospels sees in Isaiah 53 the germ-cell of the story of Jesus, the starting-point of all that is related of him, the solid nucleus round which all the rest has crystallised. The prophet deals with the Servant of Jahveh, who voluntarily submits to suffering in order to expiate the sin and guilt of the people. [emphasis added]

==== The Suffering Victim of Psalm 22 ====
Isaiah 53 is seconded by the Suffering Victim in crucial Psalm 22, especially its lines: My God, my God, why have you forsaken me? (Psalm 22:1; Mark 15:34); They hurl insults, shaking their heads. (Psalm 22:7; Mark 15:29); They divide my clothes among them and cast lots for my garment. (Psalm 22:18; Mark 15:24). Other psalms present passages supporting the figure of the Suffering Servant of Yahweh (Psalm 1, 8, 15, 23, 24, 34, 37, 43, 69, 103, 109, 110, 116, 118, 121, 128, etc.)

==== The righteous as personification of wisdom, his persecution and death ====
Drews also underlines the contribution of the character of the Just or the Righteous in the Book of Wisdom, and Sirach.

- In "Wisdom 7:15–29", she is a breath of the power of God, a pure emanation of the glory of the Almighty.
- In "Wisdom 2:10–19" the wicked are plotting against the righteous man: Let us oppress the righteous poor man,
- and in "Wisdom 2:20" they decide Let us condemn him to a shameful death, for, according to what he says, he will be protected.

Drews adds:

[Ch. 7, "The Mythic-Symbolic Interpretation of the Gospels"] According to Deuteronomy (21:23), there was no more shameful death than to hang on a tree (in Greek xylon and stauros, in Latin crux); so that this naturally occurred as the true manner of the just one's death. Then the particular motive of the death was furnished by the passage in Wisdom and the idea of Plato. He died as a victim of the unjust, the godless.

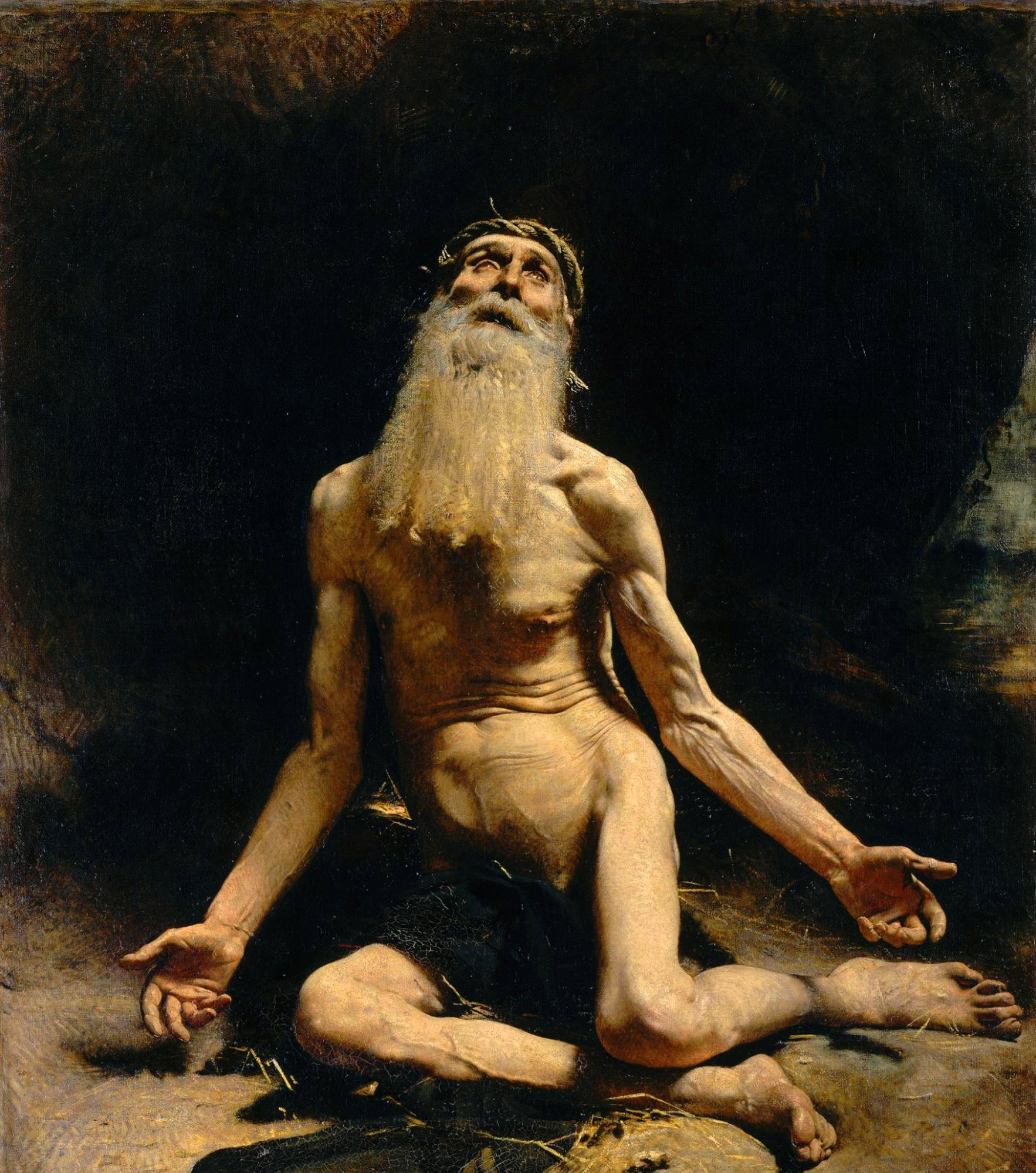
Job, by Bonnat

[Ch. 8, "Historians and the Gospels"] No one will question that the figure of Jesus in the gospels has a certain nucleus, about which all the rest has gradually crystallised. But that this nucleus is an historical personality, and not Isaiah's Servant of God, the Just of Wisdom, and the Sufferer of the 22d Psalm, is merely to beg the question; and this is the less justified since all the really important features of the gospel life of Jesus owe their origin partly to the myth, partly to the expansion and application of certain passages in the prophets.

[Ch. 13, "The Historical Jesus and the Ideal Christ"]...There is not in the centre of Christianity one particular historical human being, but the idea of man, of the suffering, struggling, humiliated, but victoriously emerging from all his humiliations, servant of God, symbolically represented in the actions and experiences of a particular historical person. [emphasis added]

==== Features of dying-and-rising God ====
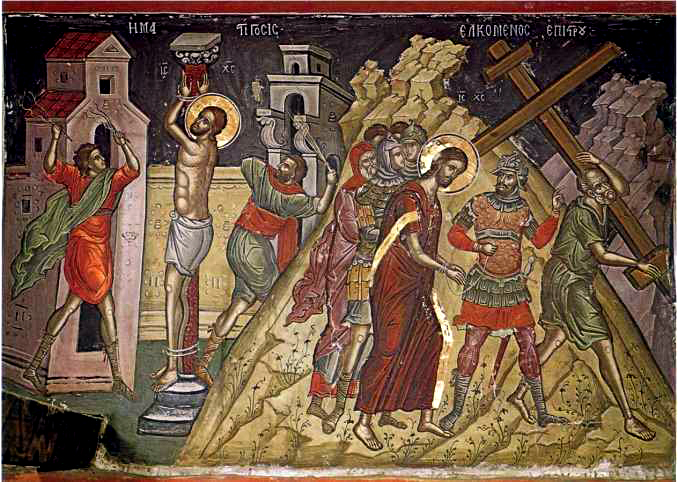
Icon of Jesus being led to Golgotha, 16th century, Theophanes the Cretan (Stavronikita Monastery, Mount Athos)

In Chapter 13, Drews emphasizes the mystery cult character of early Christian ecstatic reverence:

Isaiah's suffering servant of God, offering himself for the sins of men, the just of Wisdom in combination with the mythic ideas of a suffering, dying, and rising god-saviour of the nearer Asiatic religions — it was about these alone, as about a solid nucleus, that the contents of the new religion crystallised. The ideal Christ, not the historical Jesus of modern liberal theology, was the founder of the Christian movement... It is more probable that Jesus and Isaiah are one and the same person than that the Jesus of liberal theology brought Christianity into existence.
...that Christ became "the son of God" and descended upon the earth; that God divested himself of his divinity, took on human form, led a life of poverty with the poor, suffered, was crucified and buried, and rose again, and thus secured for men the power to rise again and to obtain forgiveness of sins and a blessed life with the heavenly father—that is the mystery of the figure of Christ; that is what the figure conveyed to the hearts of the faithful, and stirred them to an ecstatic reverence for this deepest revelation of God. [emphasis added]

== Reception ==
=== Germany ===
Jésus a-t-il vécu? Controverse religieuse sur "Le mythe du Christ"
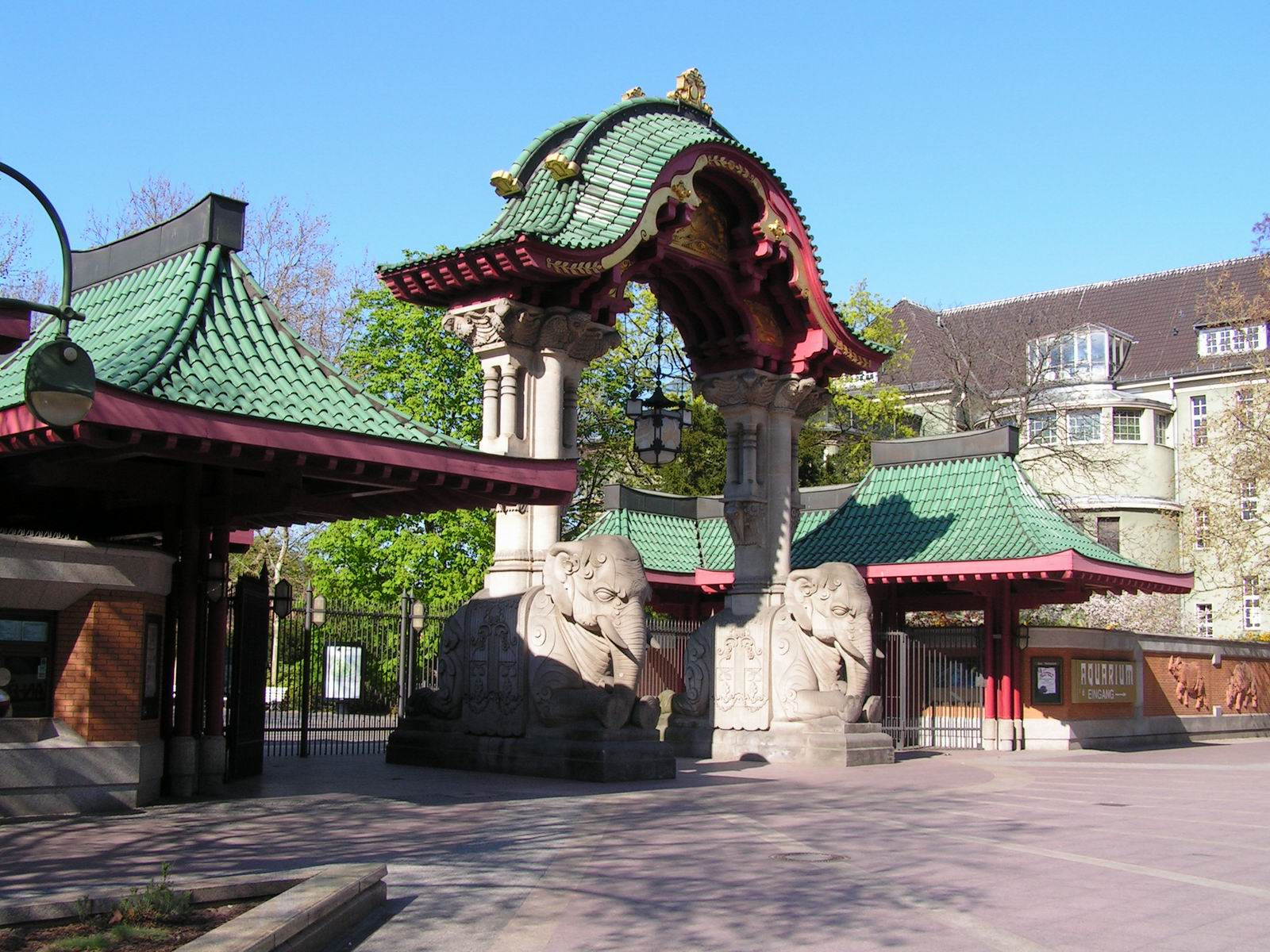
- Berlin Zoological Garden; Zoologischer Garten Berlin; The Elephant Gate entrance
- Editor: Alfred Dieterich
- Authors: Arthur Drews, Hermann von Soden, Friedrich Steudel, Georg Hollmann, Max Fischer, Friedrich Lipsius, Hans Francke, Theodor Kappstein und Max Maurenbrecher
- Original title: Hat Jesus gelebt?
- Translator: Armand Lipman
- Language: German
- Series: Berliner Religionsgespräch, Vorträge nebst Diskussion
- Published: Berlin [u.a.]
- Publisher: Verlag des Deutschen Monistenbundes
- Publication date: 1910
- Text: Jésus a-t-il vécu? Controverse religieuse sur "Le mythe du Christ" at HathiTrust
- Reden gehalten auf dem Berliner Religionsgespräch des Deutschen Monistenbundes am 31. January und 1. February 1910 im Zoologischen Garten über Die Christusmythe von Arthur Drews.

Drews managed an intense advertising campaign in Germany with lectures, articles, interviews. It caused considerable controversy. His work proved popular enough that prominent theologians and historians addressed his arguments in several leading journals of religion. In response, Drews took part in a series of public debates, which often became emotionally charged.

Drews led a militant campaign for his book, supported by the National Association of Free Religion Societies, and The National Association of Monists. which organized a huge debate on Jan 31 and Feb 1, 1910 in the Berlin Zoological Garden between monists and liberal theologians including Baron von Soden of the Berlin University. Attended by 2,000 people, including the country's most eminent theologians, the meetings went on until three in the morning. The New York Times called it "one of the most remarkable theological discussions" since the days of Martin Luther, reporting that Drews's supporters caused a sensation by plastering the town's billboards with posters asking, Did Jesus Christ ever live? According to the newspaper his arguments were so graphic that several women had to be carried from the hall screaming hysterically, while one woman stood on a chair and invited God to strike him down. On Feb 20, 1910, a counter confrontation took place in the Bush Circus. The following year, on March 12, 1911, another follow-up debate was organized. In 1912, S. J. Case noted that within the last decade, doubts about Jesus existence had been advanced in several quarters, but nowhere so insistently as in Germany where the skeptical movement had become a regular propaganda, "Its foremost champion is Arthur Drews, professor of philosophy in Karlsruhe Technical High School. Since the appearance of his Christusmythe in 1909 the subject has been kept before the public by means of debates held in various places, particularly at some important university centers such as Jena, Marburg, Giessen, Leipzig, Berlin."

=== United States ===
Drews's international popularity was confirmed by the New York Times's critical review of his Christ Myth book on March 26, 1911, "A German's Christ Myth: Prof. Arthur Drews Carries the Higher Criticism to the Point of Absurdity". The anonymous reviewer recites the current objections addressed to Drews's Christ Myth book. He lists the general criticisms addressed by theologians, denouncing

...the pseudo-scientific vagaries... in a style redolent of the professorial chair of a German pedant...[ Jesus's] characteristics...are derived from Jewish ideals floating in the air at the time...This mythical personage was transformed into a demigod by St. Paul...virtually the creator of Christianity. His main grounds for disbelief in the existence of Jesus are the absence of any contemporary references to him except in the Gospels – a rather large exception, one would think. Passages of Josephus, Tacitus and Pliny are explained away as being late, or interpolated, or applying to the myth rather than to the person...

Dr. Drews proceeds ruthlessly to remove even this kernel [of a gracious life, with its marked individuality left by liberal theologians] and leaves virtually nothing in its place except a mass of floating ideas and ideals...concentrated around a non-existent personality...

[Prof. Drews] denies the originality of the sayings attributed to Jesus, and considers them tainted with other-worldliness...[his book] is an argument in favor of...Monism...known as Pantheism...It is, however, just the sort of presentment which attracts the half-baked mind that cannot judge of historic evidence. [emphasis added]

=== Russia ===
Drews's Christ Myth was to find an unpredictable reception in Russia, as his ideas reached the new Soviet Union leadership at the end of a very circuitous route – as a distant repercussion of the philosophy of Hegel and the reactions of his students, notably the relationship between Bruno Bauer and his young student, Karl Marx.

At the end of World War I, back on the social front, the Russian revolutionary Vladimir Lenin (1870–1924) had become the successor of Marx and Engels' socialism/communism, formulating his own Russian version of Marxism-Leninism of communism and atheism. Once the Bolsheviks gained power in the Soviet Union, Marxist–Leninist atheism became de facto the official doctrine of the state, under the leadership of Lenin, the Soviet leader from 1917 until his death.

Lenin was particularly receptive to the ideas of Bruno Bauer, a former friend and ally of Karl Marx when both were Young Hegelians. According to Zvi Rosen, in Bruno Bauer and Karl Marx (1977), Lenin was eager to use Bruno Bauer's attacks on Christianity as agitprop against the bourgeoisie, as updated by Arthur Drews. He accepted Drews's thesis that Jesus had never existed as anti-Christian propaganda.

Lenin argued that it was imperative in the struggle against religious obscurantists to adopt revolutionary ideas like those of Drews, and demolish the icons of bourgeois society. Several editions of Drews's The Christ Myth were published in the Soviet Union from the early 1920s onwards, and his arguments were included in school and university textbooks. Public meetings debating Did Christ live? were organized, during which party operatives debated with clergymen.

However, this acceptance of his ideas in Moscow and the Soviet Union did not save Drews, a believer, from Lenin's attacks, for being a "reactionary, openly helping the exploiters to replace old and rotten prejudices with new, still more disgusting and base prejudices".

At home, the diffusion of his book in the USSR had no impact on Drews's modest life as a teacher in Karlsruhe and were of no use to improving his social lot.

=== Influence on Couchoud and G.A. Wells ===
In a different development to the West, Arthur Drews became influential on the formation of the "Jesus existence denial" theories of Paul-Louis Couchoud and G. A. Wells. Fluent in German, they had followed the huge academic controversy over the Christ Myth, and were able to read all of Drews's work in the original German. They both accepted and adapted Drews's main ideas. Drews had finally found some followers abroad, both in France and England. Wells, for instance, saw Jesus as a personification of Wisdom, which had appeared on earth in some indefinite time past. William B. Smith in the US, who also could read German fluently, remained a very close ally and a kindred soul.

In the same manner that Schweitzer is a seminal reference for historicists, Drews is a basic reference for the denial of Jesus historicity. Arthur Drews left his mark on practically the whole development of the Christ Myth thesis, (so-called "mythicism") which followed him.

=== Professional theologians ===
In Christ Myth II (1912), Drews describes the cultural commotion:

Now the whole Press is engaged against the disturber of the peace...Opposing lectures and Protestant meetings are organised, and J. Weiss publicly declares that the author of the book has no right to be taken seriously. But among his fellows, within the four walls of the lecture-hall, and in the printed version of his lectures, Weiss assures his readers that he has taken the matter 'very seriously', and speaks of the fateful hour through which our [theological] science is passing. [emphasis added]

Most significant theologian scholars immediately felt the need to take up the challenge and entered the debate sparked off by Drews's Christ Myth about the Historicity of Jesus. Most of the responses world-wide by theologians were violently negative and critical.

But Drews had some quality supporters, like the famous Orientalist Peter Jensen. Coincidentally, M. M. Mangasarian also published in 1909 The Truth About Jesus, Is He A Myth?. In 1912, William Benjamin Smith published Ecce Deus: Studies of Primitive Christianity, (with an introduction by Paul Wilhelm Schmiedel (1912).

=== Albert Schweitzer ===
To discuss Drews's thesis, Albert Schweitzer added two new chapters in the 1913 second edition of his Quest of the Historical Jesus. (Geschichte der Leben-Jesu-Forschung, 2. Auflage, 1913)

G.P.J.P. Bolland

Ch. 22, (p. 451–499), "The New Denial of the Historicity of Jesus" (Die Neueste Bestreitung der Geschichtlichkeit Jesu) analyzes Drews's thesis, plus eight writers in support of Drews's thesis about the non-existence of Jesus: J. M. Robertson, Peter Jensen, Andrzej Niemojewski, Christian Paul Fuhrmann, W.B. Smith, Thomas Whittaker, G.J.P.J. Bolland, Samuel Lublinski. Three of them favor mythic-astral explanations.

Ch. 23 (p. 500–560), "The Debate About the Historicity of Jesus" (Die Diskussion über die Geschichtlichkeit Jesu), reviews the publications of 40 theologians/scholars in response to Drews, and mentions the participants in the Feb. 1910 public debate. Most of the publications are critical and negative. Schweitzer continues his systematic exposure of the problems and difficulties in the theories of the Bestreiter ("challengers') and Verneiner ("deniers") — the Dutch Radicals, J. M. Robertson, W. B. Smith and Drews – and the authenticity of Paul's epistles and Paul's historicity as well.

=== The Christ Myth theological debate, in 1909–1913 and 1914–1927, tabulated by Peter De Mey ===
Albert Schweitzer, The Quest of the Historical Jesus, First translation of the 1913 2d ed. (2001)

Peter De Mey, a professor of Systematic Theology at the Catholic Un. of Leuven (Belgium), in a comprehensive paper "On Rereading the Christ Myth Theological Debate" (c. 2004), cited and tabulated refutations from academic theologians in Germany, Britain, the United States, and France. De Mey offers a list of 87 books and articles: 83 publications in 1909–1927 (62 in German, 19 in English, 2 in French), plus 4 isolated odd ones. A near-unanimity of the responses cited by De Mey are opposed to Drews's conclusions, with some variations.

- – 68 citations of publications in the 1909–1913 period (52 in German, 14 in English, 2 in French), until Schweitzer's 2d edition of The Quest (1913). The list includes established German authorities such as Wilhelm Bousset, Daniel Chwolson, Alfred Jeremias, Adolf Jülicher, Paul Wilhelm Schmiedel, Albert Schweitzer, Paul Tillich, Ernst Troeltsch, Hermann von Soden, and Johannes Weiss
  Of the 40 theologians already listed by Schweitzer's Quest in his second edition, De Mey ignores nine scholars (as not being "fundamental" theologians) that Schweitzer had considered significant, including an important response by the famous Babylonian expert Peter Jensen.
- – 15 citations after the 2d edition of The Quest, in 1914–1927. Of those, 10 were in German, 5 in English.

=== Refutations from 1912 to WW II ===
- Shirley Jackson Case (1872–1947), The Historicity of Jesus: a Criticism of the Contention that Jesus Never Lived, a Statement of the Evidence for His Existence, an Estimate of His Relation to Christianity (1912) uses the Christ of Faith as the basis for his argumentation, maintaining the validity of the supernatural, miracles and resurrection. In the "world-view in which natural law" is "dominant" and "reason and human experience have been made fundamental" and replaced "supernatural revelation", the Gospels are no longer perceived in their authentic light – being "reinterpreted...or else dismissed as utterly unhistorical." (Ch. 1)

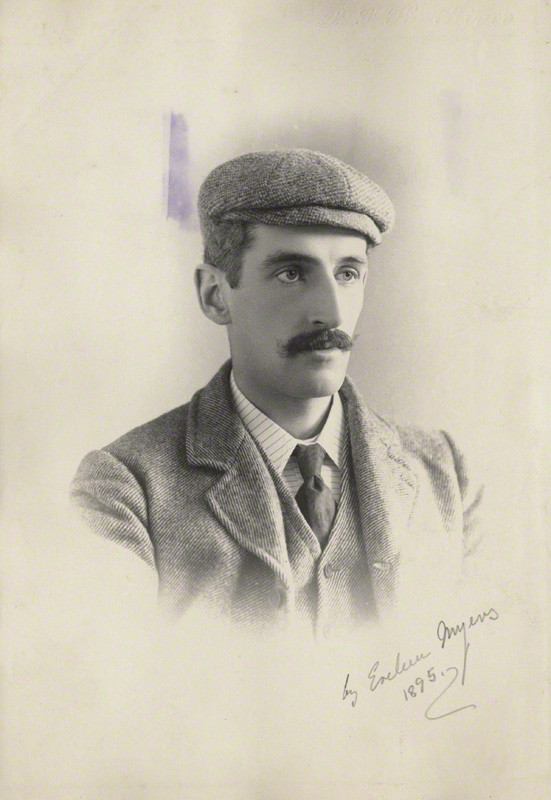
Frederick Cornwallis Conybeare, 1895

- Frederick Cornwallis Conybeare (1856–1924), The historical Christ, or, An investigation of the views of Mr. J.M. Robertson, Dr. A. Drews, and Prof. W.B. Smith, (1914) reads the texts as showing a gradual deification of a man, pointing to an existing human source.
- Maurice Goguel (1880–1955), Jesus The Nazarene, Myth Or History? (1926) suggests that Christianity started as a mystery cult, with a hero of a recent date, a Jewish faith-healer who came to believe he was the Messiah, and got executed by Pilate. Paul is a confusing patchwork of ideas and remains unexplained.
- A.D. Howell Smith (b. 1880), Jesus Not A Myth (1942). Smith argues that the early Christian texts never call Jesus a God, and that the prediction that the Kingdom of God will happen during the lifetime of his listeners is a strong argument for the historicity of the preacher.
- Archibald Robertson (1886–1961), Jesus: Myth or History? (1946). Robertson's father (same name) was Principal of King's College, London and Bishop of Exeter. Robertson became a journalist/author. His book is an account of the public debate in the 1890–1940 period. It lists the key spokesmen, gives an analysis of their main arguments, and ends by seeking a compromise between both sides. Robertson pits two teams:

– 11 "historicists": Frederick C. Conybeare, Thomas K. Cheyne, Paul W. Schmiedel, Alfred Loisy, Albert Schweitzer, Charles Guignebert, Rudolf Bultmann, Joseph Klausner, Robert Eisler, Maurice Goguel, A.D. Howell Smith;
– against 8 "mythicists": Bruno Bauer, John M. Robertson, Thomas Whittaker, William B. Smith, Arthur Drews, Paul-Louis Couchoud, L. Gordon Rylands, Édouard Dujardin.

=== "Mythicism" ===
In their books, A.D. Howell Smith (1942) and Archibald Robertson (1946) popularized the use of mythicist (L19, i.e. late 19th century, "a student, interpreter, or creator of myths; also an adherent or student of mythicism), and mythicism (rare, M19, "attributing an origin in myth to narratives of supernatural events"; also "the tendency to create myths"). Both were adopted as a convenient shorthand for the "denial of Jesus existence", or the "thesis of non-historicity".

For Drews, Jesus historicity is the thesis, always affirmed and demonstrated first, while Jesus historicity denial was the antithesis in a Hegelian sense, always coming in second position, after the positive thesis. Same thing with Schweitzer, who, in the rebuttals in the 2d edition of the Quest (Ch. 22 & 23), only speaks of Bestreiter der Geschichtlikchkeit Jesu, or Verneiner i.e. challengers, or deniers of the historicity of Jesus. Jesus has to be phenomenologically defined, before his existence can be denied.

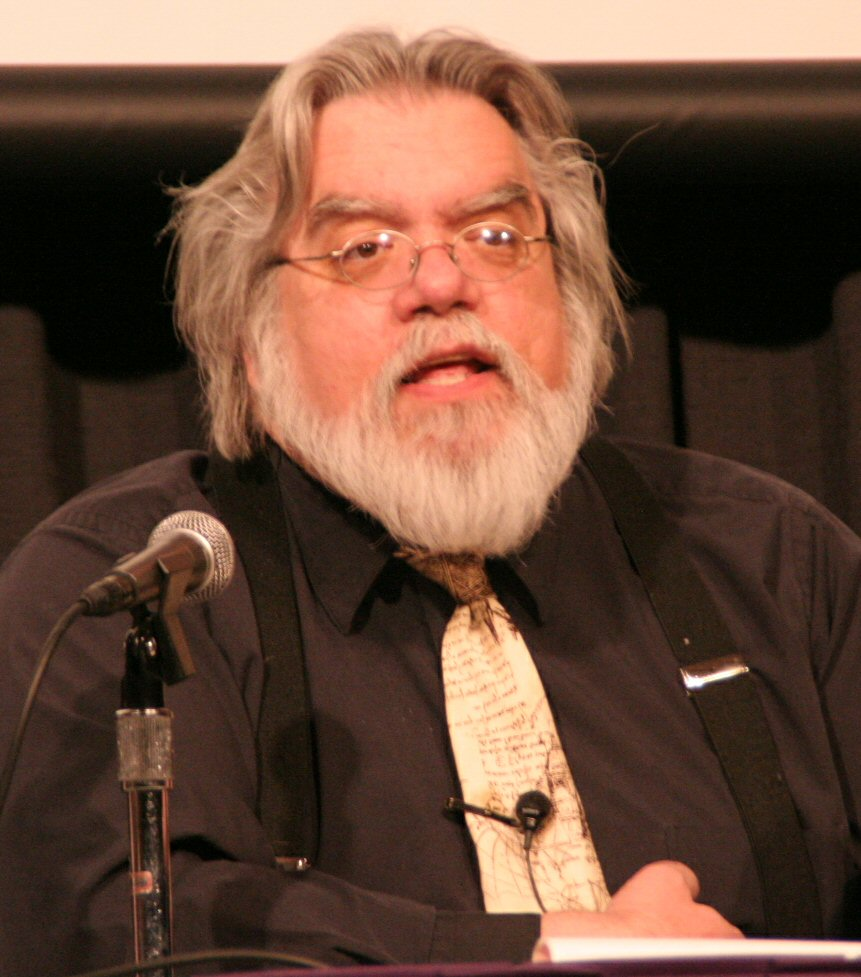
Robert M. Price, Deconstructing Jesus

Theologians claim that mythicism is a positive assertion, with the historicist only putting up a defense against the mythicists. For instance, Hoffmann decries Ehrman's book as "entirely inadequate as a defense".

In fact, historicists exhibit vastly different constructions of the historical Jesus — to the point of creating a "mess". Schweitzer never attacks an abstract anonymous doctrine. As a historian, he always addresses the arguments of specific scholars and writers, from the platform of his own personal arguments, avoids weasel expressions and specifically "names names".

=== "Jesus Historicists" vs "Historicity Deniers" ===
World War II put a stop to the public debate initially set off by Arthur Drews, until George Albert Wells (b. 1926), a professor of German at Un. of London, reignited it in the 70s with a series of books directly influenced by his readings of Bruno Bauer, Kalthoff and Drews in their original German. A whole series of scholars have re-opened the debate by publishing major refutations of Drews's Christ Myth thesis, including Ian Wilson (1984), R.T. France (1986), Morton Smith (1986), Graham N. Stanton (1989), Robert Van Voorst (2000), James Beilby and Paul R. Eddy (2009), R. Joseph Hoffmann (1986 and 2010).

Various conferences have been held in the US and Europe, notably by the Committee for the Scientific Examination of Religion (2007), and the Center for Inquiry CFI (2010), with scholars from both sides, such as Robert M. Price making contributions.

Major committees have been formed for communal examinations of the topics of historicity versus non-historicity, including:

- The famous Jesus Seminar formed by Robert Funk in 1985 under the tutelage of the Westar Institute,
- The Jesus Project (Dec. 2007-Oct. 2009), under the leadership of R. Joseph Hoffmann and Robert M. Price. Its goal was "to take the theory [of the non-existence of Jesus] as a 'testable hypothesis' and use the best methods of critical inquiry to reach a probable conclusion."
- The Jesus Process, formed in May 2012 as another round of inquiry with a new cast.

With the spread of the Internet, the old theological controversy that was raging 100 years ago has percolated down to the public forum and known a recrudescence, with a "upsurge" of the non-existence thesis. Both academic and independent scholars have ridden the new boom with publications all aimed at discussing the Christ Myth thesis and its aftermath, including major works by Robert M. Price (August 2011), Bart D. Ehrman (March 2012), Richard Carrier (April 2012), Thomas L. Thompson and Thomas Verenna (July 2012), and Maurice Casey (August 2012).

=== R. Joseph Hoffmann ===
R. Joseph Hoffmann is a historian of Early Christianity. Educated by Catholic nuns, he has remained a sentimental defender of the Church, a vocal advocate of Jesus' historicity, and a standard-bearer in the campaign against Arthur Drews's non-historicity thesis. He participated in the Jesus Seminar and the aborted Jesus Project. Hoffmann also runs an Internet blog, the New Oxonian. Hoffmann is well known for his witty, highly erudite and often acerbic style, and his penchant for complicated and extreme declarations. In May 2012, Hoffmann presented the Jesus Process defined as yet another round on the popular theme of "Consultation on the Historical Jesus". An introductory manifesto for the new group has been outlined in "Controversy, Mythicism, and the Historical Jesus" of May 22, 2012.

When listing the major refutations of the Christ Myth thesis (Note [3]), Hoffmann notes that the "important studies" are the five works by S. J. Case, F. C. Conybeare, Maurice Goguel, R. T. France, and Morton Smith. Hoffmann omits from that list many historically significant refutations such as Albert Schweitzer's critique of the Christ Myth in the added chapters 22 & 23 of the second edition of the Quest (1913, translated in 2001), or Robert Van Voorst's work.

Hoffmann has systematically used the New Oxonian for striking rhetorical blows at Drews's non-historical thesis. He does not hesitate to impute to Drews "a kind of proto-Nazi paganism".

[M]yth-theorists have normally held that the gospel writers... wrote fraudulent or consciously deceptive tales... The elimination of James as a "prop" for the historical Jesus has been a priority of the myth theorizers...[an] insupportable contention...[Drews is] [f]amous for his academic inexactness and sensationalism...with the glaring mistake...Despite the energy of the myth school...It remains a quaint, curious, interesting but finally unimpressive assessment of the evidence... an agenda-driven "waste of time"... a quicksand of denial and half-cooked conspiracy theories that take skepticism and suspicion to a new low. Like all failed hypotheses, it arrives at its premise by intuition, cherry picks its evidence... defends its "conclusions" by force majeure... a dogma in search of footnotes... its most ardent supporters... have been amateurs or dabblers in New Testament studies... least equipped by training or inclination ...[The Christ Myth is] manically disorientated, [arguing] a kind of proto-Nazi paganism... Drews is significant largely because he created the flashpoints to which many mythicists return again and again...[Emphasis added]

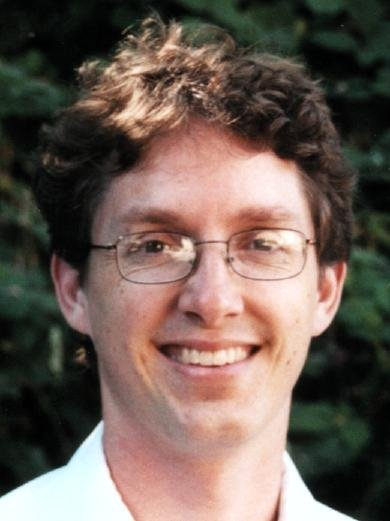
Richard C. Carrier, Proving History: Bayes’s Theorem & the Quest for the Historical Jesus

Hoffmann has declared that the non-historicity thesis should no longer be ignored, but must be confronted head-on: "I have often made the claim that it has been largely theological interests since Strauss’s time that ruled the historicity question out of court." [Emphasis added.].

Bart D. Ehrman, Misquoting Jesus

Hoffmann has mentioned that Bart D. Ehrman's book, Did Jesus Exist?, is "exceptionally disappointing and not an adequate rejoinder to the routinely absurd ideas of the Jesus-deniers. For that reason... I have had to abandon my indifference and get back into the fight—on the side of the son of man.". Hoffmann has announced a major book, intended to become the master refutation of the Christ Myth thesis, in order to block the increase of its popularity, and to safeguard the integrity of New Testament studies (New Oxonian, May 22, 2012)

This essay is in part an attempt to clarify procedural issues relevant to what is sometimes called the "Christ-myth" or "Non-historicity" thesis—an argumentative approach to the New Testament based on the theory that the historical Jesus of Nazareth did not exist...The failure of scholars to take the "question of Jesus" seriously has resulted in a slight increase in the popularity of the non-historicity thesis, a popularity that—in my view—now threatens to distract biblical studies from the serious business of illuminating the causes, context and development of early Christianity...It is a preface of sorts to a more ambitious project on the myth theory itself and what we can reliably know–if anything—about the historical Jesus. [Emphasis added]
