= Andrzej Niemojewski =

Polish social and political activist, poet and writer (1864–1921)

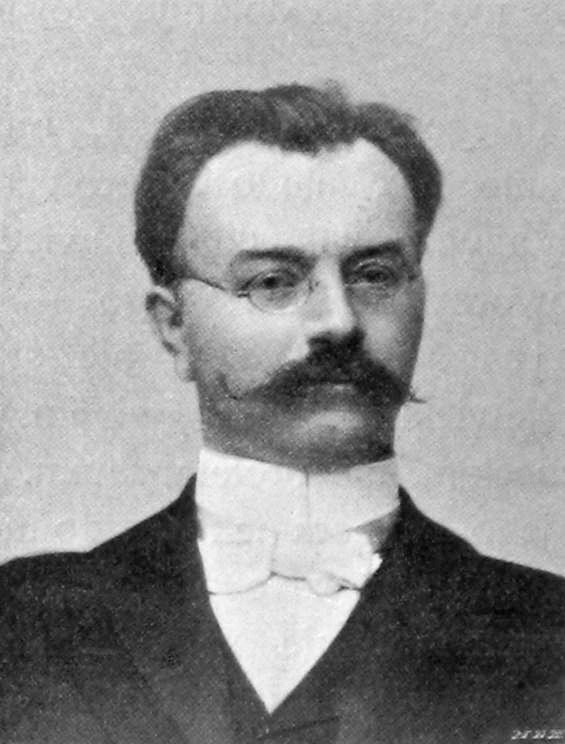
- Born: 24 January 1864
- Died: 3 November 1921 (aged 57); Warsaw
- Occupations: Poet, political activist, rationalist, writer

Andrzej Niemojewski (24 January 1864 – 3 November 1921) was a Polish social and political activist, poet, rationalist and writer of the Young Poland period.

== God Jesus ==
Niemojewski was best known as a proponent of the Christ myth theory. He was the author of Gott Jesus im Lichte fremder und eigener Forschungen samt Darstellung der evangelischen Astralstoffe, Astralszenen und Astralsysteme (1910). The book was translated in 1996 as God Jesus: The Sun, Moon and Stars as Background to the Gospel Stories (1910).

Albert Schweitzer added two new chapters in the 1913 second edition of his Quest of the Historical Jesus. (Geschichte der Leben-Jesu-Forschung, 2. Auflage, 1913) which features God Jesus in one chapter.

- Ch. 22, (p. 451–499), "The New Denial of the Historicity of Jesus" (Die Neueste Bestreitung der Geschichtlichkeit Jesu) analyzes Drews's thesis, plus eight writers in support of Arthur Drews's thesis about the non-existence of Jesus: J. M. Robertson, Peter Jensen, Andrzej Niemojewski, Christian Paul Fuhrmann, W.B. Smith, Thomas Whittaker, G.J.P.J. Bolland, Samuel Lublinski. Three of them favor mythic-astral explanations.

Arthur Drews featured God Jesus in his 1926 work, The Denial of the Historicity of Jesus in Past and Present;

A. Niemojewski's main book appeared in 1910. It also shows a divine Jesus preceding any rumours about a human one. Contradictions in the Gospel tales prove that they are impossibly about one and the same person -- especially the sayings aren't from a single person. The sayings are co-opted from Jewish common sources and stuffed into the mouth of the alleged master Jesus.

The most important part of the Gospels, besides the logia, are miracles. One can't neglect them as the liberal Jesus proponents do, without destroying Christian scripture. Miracles are proofs for the divinity of Jesus. Falsely so-called proofs about the human Jesus, like Flavius Josephus, are easily dismissed as chatty hearsays or interpolations.

Niemojewski continues the line of Volney and Dupuis, by looking for parallels in astral mythology. The Tanakh and Talmud are already full of astral mythological images, like the 12 Jewish tribes and sons of Jacob. Even more, of course, the New Testament. This is seen strongest in the Apocalypse of John. The twin myth, applied to Jesus and John, is especially interesting for Niemojewski. The constellation of Gemini plays a central role for Niemojewski. The astral mythological elements are strongest in the Gospels of Matthew and Luke; Mark contains them only quite marginally.

In the end, Niemojewski's system was too confusing to get much consideration, when compared to simpler astral mythical interpretations.

In the Appendix of The Witnesses to the Historicity of Jesus, Drews writes ;

If we substitute for the “crucified” Orion of the twenty-second psalm the two other important celestial crosses the vernal cross with the Earn (Lamb) and the autumnal cross with the Cup (skull) below it, the Virgin, Berenice's Hair (megaddela=Mary Magdalene), etc.—we have all the astral elements of what Niemojewski calls the “astral via dolorosa” (p. 413). May we suppose, in fine, that Orion itself plays the part of the crucified Saviour? In that case the (weeping) women at the cross are represented by the Pleiades (the “rainsisters”), one of which bears the name of Maja (Maria). The Pleiades also are hair-dressers (megaddela), as they are represented in medieval manuscripts on the basis of an old tradition, and they culminate when Berenice's Hair rises above the eastern horizon. Electra is supposed to be the centre of the Pleiades. She is the mother of Jasios (Jesus), and is represented as a mourner with a cloth over her head, just in the same way as the Christian Mary. But as Jasios was also regarded, according to another genealogy, as the son of Maja, the mourning Pleiad may also stand for her. As is known, the mother of Jesus also is a dove (peleids, Pleiad) in the early Christian conception.

According to Niemojewski, the cup (gulguleth= skull) represents the heavenly Golgotha. But we may refer it to the skull of the Bull and the head of Medusa, and regard “the place of skulls” as the region of the heavens where Orion is found. On this supposition the two evil-doers are recognised in the Twins, which we have already ascertained to be the astral criminals. Castor is regarded as evil on account of his relation to winter, and Pollux good on account of his relation to summer. Niemojewski sees the two evil-doers in the Dogs (Sirius and Procyon). The difference is not great, as the Dogs culminate at the same time as the Twins, and may therefore be substituted for them.

Here we have firm ground on which to establish the originally astral and mythical character of the remainder of the story of Jesus, and we seem to have a very strong proof that there was a cult of “the crucified” before the time of Jesus, and that the nucleus of the figure of Jesus is in reality purely astral.

All the oriental religions, including Judaism, are essentially astral religions. We have previously (p. 223) shown that Revelation is a Jewish-Gnostic work, the Jesus of which is more primitive than the Jesus of the gospels. But Revelation is entirely and certainly of an astral character. It is a further proof that Christianity is no exception to the rule.

== Works ==
- Gott Jesus im Lichte fremder und eigener Forschungen samt Darstellung der evangelischen Astralstoffe, Astralszenen und Astralsysteme (1910) Abridged by Violet MacDermot and translated from the German by Anna Meuss and Violet MacDermot as God Jesus: The Sun, Moon and Stars as Background to the Gospel Stories (Janus Publishing Company, 1996)
- Warum eilten die Jünger nach Emmaus? (1911)
