= The Quest of the Historical Jesus =

1906 book by Albert Schweitzer

- 2001 expanded edition
- Author: Albert Schweitzer
- Original title: Geschichte der Leben-Jesu-Forschung
- Translator: William Montgomery
- Language: German
- Published: 1906 (418 pp.); 1913 expanded edition (650 pp.)
- English publication date: 1910; 2001 Expanded edition
- Media type: Print
- Text: The Quest of the Historical Jesus at Wikisource

The Quest of the Historical Jesus (German: Von Reimarus zu Wrede: eine Geschichte der Leben-Jesu-Forschung, literally "From Reimarus to Wrede: a History of Life-of-Jesus Research") is a 1906 work of Biblical historical criticism written by Albert Schweitzer during the previous year, before he began to study for a medical degree.

The original edition was translated into English by William Montgomery and published in 1910. An expanded second German edition was published during 1913, containing theologically significant revisions and expansions. This expanded edition was not published in English until 2001.

== Presentation ==
In The Quest, Schweitzer reviews all prior work on the question of the "historical Jesus" starting with the late 18th century. He points out how Jesus' image has changed with the times and with the personal proclivities of the various authors. He concludes with his own synopsis and interpretation of what had been learned over the course of the previous century. He takes the position that the life and thinking of Jesus must be interpreted in the light of Jesus' own convictions, which he characterizes as those of "late Jewish eschatology", and that Jesus defies any attempt at understanding him by making parallels to the ways of thinking or feeling of modern men. In Schweitzer's view, Jesus genuinely believed that his ministry would bring about the end of history and did not see any prolonged period elapsing between his time on earth and God's final judgment.

The 1913 second edition of Quest included a rebuttal to the "mythicists" of his day, i.e. those scholars who maintain that no historical Jesus ever existed.

=== The Position of the Subject at the Close of The Nineteenth Century ===
- Oskar Holtzman.

- Das Leben Jesu. Tübingen, 1901. 417 pp.
- Das Messianitätsbewusstsein Jesu und seine neueste Bestreitung. Vortrag. (The Messianic Consciousness of Jesus and the most recent denial of it. A Lecture.) 1902. 26 pp. (Against Wrede.)
- War Jesus Ekstatiker? (Was Jesus an ecstatic?) Tübingen, 1903. 139 pp.

- Paul Wilhelm Schmidt.

- Die Geschichte Jesu. (The History of Jesus.) Freiburg, 1899. 175 pp. (4th impression.)
- Die Geschichte Jesu erläutert. Mit drei Karten von Prof. K. Furrer (Zürich). (The History of Jesus. Preliminary Discussions. With three maps by Prof. K. Furrer of Zurich.) Tübingen, 1904. 414 pp.

- Otto Schmiedel.

- Die Hauptprobleme der Leben-Jesu-Forschung. (The main Problems in the Study of the Life of Jesus.) Tübingen, 1902. 71 pp. 2nd ed., 1906.

- Hermann Freiherr von Soden.

- Die wichtigsten Fragen im Leben Jesu. (The most important Questions about the Life of Jesus.) Vacation Lectures. Berlin, 1904. 111 pp.

- Gustav Frenssen.

- Hilligenlei. Berlin, 1905. pp. 462-593: "Die Handschrift." ("The Manuscript"-in which a Life of Jesus, written by one of the characters of the story, is given in full.)

- Otto Pfleiderer.

- Das Urchristentum, seine Schriften und Lehren in geschichtlichem Zusammenhang beschrieben. (Primitive Christianity. Its Documents and Doctrines in their Historical Context.) 2nd ed. Berlin, 1902. Vol. i., 696 pp.
- Die Entstehung des Urchristentums. (How Primitive Christianity arose.) Munich, 1905. 255 pp.

- Albert Kalthoff.

- Das Christus-Problem. Grundlinien zu einer Sozialtheologie. (The Christ-problem. The Ground-plan of a Social Theology.) Leipzig, 1902.
- Die Entstehung des Christentums. Neue Beiträge zum Christus-Problem. (How Christianity arose. New contributions to the Christ-problem.) Leipzig, 1904. 155 pp.

- Eduard von Hartmann.

- Das Christentum des Neuen Testaments. (The Christianity of the New Testament.) 2nd revised edition of "Letters on the Christian Religion." Sachsa-in-the-Harz, 1905. 311 pp.

- De Jonge.

- Jeschua. Der klassische jüdische Mann. Zerstörung des kirchlichen, Enthüllung des jüdischen Jesus-Bildes. Berlin, 1904. 112 pp. (Jeshua. The Classical Jewish Man. In which the Jewish picture of Jesus is unveiled, and the ecclesiastical picture destroyed.)

- Wolfgang Kirchbach.

- Was lehrte Jesus? Zwei Urevangelien. (What was the teaching of Jesus? Two Primitive Gospels.) Berlin, 1897. 248 pp. 2nd revised and greatly enlarged edition, 1902, 339 pp.

- Albert Dulk.

- Der Irrgang des Lebens Jesu. In geschichtlicher Auffassung dargestellt. (The Error of the Life of Jesus. An Historical View.) 1st part, 1884, 395 pp.; 2nd part, 1885, 302 pp.

- Paul de Regla.

- Jesus von Nazareth. German by A. Just. Leipzig, 1894. 435 pp.

- Ernest Bosc.

- La vie ésotérique de Jésus de Nazareth et les origines orientales du christianisme. (The secret Life of Jesus of Nazareth, and the Oriental Origins of Christianity.) Paris, 1902.

== Analysis ==
Schweitzer wrote that Jesus and his followers expected the imminent end of the world. He became very focused on the study and cross referencing of the many Biblical verses promising the return of the Son of Man and the exact details of this urgent event, as it was originally believed that it would unfold. He noted that in the Gospel of Mark, Jesus speaks of a "tribulation," with nation rising against nation, false prophets, earthquakes, stars falling from the sky, and the coming of the Son of Man "in the clouds with great power and glory." Jesus even tells his disciples when all this will happen: "Verily I say unto you, that this generation shall not pass, till all these things be done." (Mark 13:30) The same story is told in the Gospel of Matthew, with Jesus promising his rapid return as the Son of Man, and again saying: "Verily I say unto you, this generation shall not pass, till all these things be fulfilled." Even Paul the Apostle believed these things, Schweitzer observes (e.g. 1 Thessalonians 4), and Schweitzer concludes that Christians of the first-century theology literally believed in the imminent fulfilment of Jesus's promise.

Schweitzer writes that the many modern versions of Christianity deliberately ignore the urgency of the message that Jesus proclaimed. Each new generation hopes to be the one to see the world destroyed, another world coming, and the saints governing a new earth. Schweitzer thus concludes that the First Century theology, originating in the lifetimes of those who first followed Jesus, is both incompatible and very different from those beliefs later made official by various councils of the Church.

Schweitzer established his reputation further as a New Testament scholar with other theological studies including The Psychiatric Study of Jesus (1913, medical degree dissertation; criticism of works challenging Jesus' mental health) and his two studies of the apostle Paul, Paul and his Interpreters, and the more complete The Mysticism of Paul the Apostle (1930). This examined the eschatological beliefs of Paul and (through this) the message of the New Testament.

== Expanded second edition ==
Albert Schweitzer, The Quest of the Historical Jesus, First translation of the 1913 2nd ed. (2001)

The Christ Myth was first published in 1909 by Arthur Drews on the Christ myth theory and the denial of the existence of a historical Jesus. To discuss Drews's thesis, Schweitzer added two new chapters in the 1913 second edition of his work, The Quest of the Historical Jesus. (Geschichte der Leben-Jesu-Forschung, 2. Auflage, 1913)

- Ch. 22, (p. 451–499), "The New Denial of the Historicity of Jesus" (Die Neueste Bestreitung der Geschichtlichkeit Jesu) analyzes Drews's thesis, plus eight writers in support of Drews's thesis about the non-existence of Jesus: J. M. Robertson, Peter Jensen, Andrzej Niemojewski, Christian Paul Fuhrmann, W.B. Smith, Thomas Whittaker, G.J.P.J. Bolland, Samuel Lublinski. Three of them favor mythic-astral explanations.
- Ch. 23 (p. 500–560), "The Debate About the Historicity of Jesus" (Die Diskussion über die Geschichtlichkeit Jesu), reviews the publications of 40 theologians/scholars in response to Drews, and mentions the participants in the Feb. 1910 public debate. Most of the publications are critical and negative. Schweitzer continues his systematic exposure of the problems and difficulties in the theories of the Bestreiter ("challengers') and Verneiner ("deniers") — the Dutch Radicals, J. M. Robertson, W. B. Smith and Drews – and the authenticity of Paul's epistles and Paul's historicity as well.

An examination of the claims for and against the historicity of Jesus thus reveals that the difficulties faced by those undertaking to prove that he is not historical, in the fields both of the history of religion and the history of doctrine, and not least in the interpretation of the earliest tradition are far more numerous and profound than those which face their opponents. Seen in their totality, they must be considered as having no possible solution. Added to this, all hypotheses which have so far been put forward to the effect that Jesus never lived are in the strangest opposition to each other, both in their method of working and their interpretation of the Gospel reports, and thus merely cancel each other out. Hence we must conclude that the supposition that Jesus did exist is exceedingly likely, whereas its converse is exceedingly unlikely. This does not mean that the latter will not be proposed again from time to time, just as the romantic view of the life of Jesus is also destined for immortality. It is even able to dress itself up with certain scholarly technique, and with a little skillful manipulation can have much influence on the mass of people. But as soon as it does more than engage in noisy polemics with 'theology' and hazards an attempt to produce real evidence, it immediately reveals itself to be an implausible hypothesis. (pp. 435–436)

== Influence ==
This book established Schweitzer's reputation. Its publication effectively stopped for decades work on the Historical Jesus as a sub-discipline of New Testament studies. This work resumed however with the development of the so-called "Second Quest", among whose notable exponents were Rudolf Bultmann's students Ernst Käsemann and Gunther Bornkamm, his successor as professor of New Testament Studies at the University of Heidelberg, who wrote that the Gospels “bring before our eyes…the historical person of Jesus with the utmost vividness.” Richard Webster writes that the messianic fantasies associated with the story of the crucifixion in the Gospels are perhaps still best understood by way of The Quest of the Historical Jesus.

Bart Ehrman describes The Quest as a "foundational study for anybody interested in the historical Jesus", stating "it is so insightful, and brilliant, and witty" and that Schweitzer's view that Jesus was an apocalypticist "has held, since his day. His particular ways of doing it are held by nobody, but the basic idea that he got, absolutely seems to be right".

== See also ==
- Biblical criticism
- Quest for the historical Jesus
