= Georg Benedikt Winer =

German Protestant theologian

Georg Benedikt Winer (13 April 1789, Leipzig – 12 May 1858, Leipzig) was a German Protestant theologian, known for his linguistic studies of the New Testament. Theologically, Winer was an "anti-trinitarian".

== Life ==
After attending the Old St Nicholas School in Leipzig, he studied theology at the Leipzig University. In 1819 he began work as a curator at the Universitätsbibliothek Leipzig. In 1823 he became a full professor of theology at the University of Erlangen, then in 1832 returned to Leipzig, where he worked in a similar role as in Erlangen. On several separate occasions he served as dean to the theological faculty, and in 1842 was named university rector.

From 1824 to 1830 he edited with J. G. V. Engelhardt, the Neues kritisches Journal der theologischen Literatur, and alone from 1826 to 1832, the Zeitschrift für wissenschaftliche Theologie. He is well known as the author of a Grammatik des neutestamentlichen Sprachidioms (1821, 8th edition, revised by P. W. Schmiedel, 1894 ff.), of which several translations have appeared, one of them being by W. F. Moulton (1870, 3rd edition 1882; "A Treatise on the Grammar of New Testament Greek").

His other works include:

- Komparative Darstellung des Lehrbegriffs der verschiedenen christlichen Kirchenpartheien (1824; 4th edition by P. Ewald, 1882; English translation as "A comparative view of the doctrines and confessions of the various communities of Christendom", 1873).
- Biblisches Realwörterbuch (1820; 3rd edition 1847–1848, 2 volumes) – Biblical dictionary.
- Grammatik des biblischen und targumischen Chaldaismus (1824; 3rd edition by B Fischer, Chaldäische Grammatik für Bibel und Talmud, 1882; English translation as Grammar of the Chaldee Language as contained in the Bible and the Targums, 1842).
- Zeitschrift für wissenschaftliche Theologie (1820; 3rd edition 1838–1840, 2 volumes; supplement, 1842) – Handbook of theological literature.
