= Walter Miller (philologist) =

American linguist and archaeologist (1864–1949)

Samuel Walter Miller (May 5, 1864 – July 28, 1949) was an American linguist, classics scholar and archaeologist responsible for the first American excavation in Greece and a founder of the Stanford University Classics department.

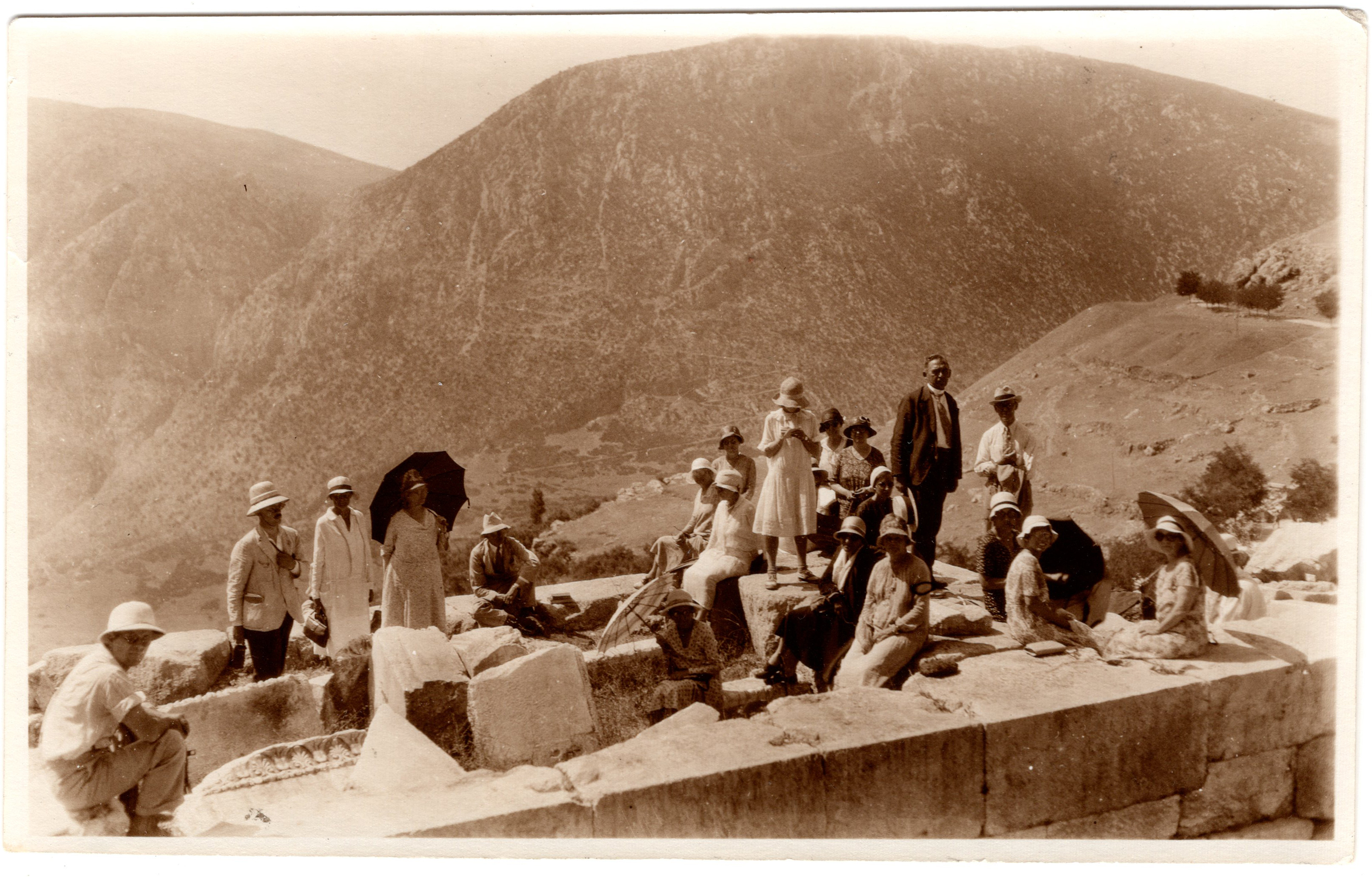
Aeneid Cruise group being led by Dean Miller of the U. of Missouri's Graduate School at Delphi (standing bare headed)

== Early life ==
He was born in Ashland County, Ohio to agrarian parents. After receiving an M.A. from the University of Michigan in 1884, he requested further funding from his father to pursue studies in Germany. His father noted that he couldn't possibly see how anyone could ever need any more education but Miller moved to the University of Leipzig for doctoral studies from 1884 to 1885. The next year he joined the American School of Classical Studies in Athens, Greece, where Professor Frederic de Forest Allen charged Miller with the first American excavation in Greece, seeking the stage of the Theater of Thorikos. 25-30 workmen were paid 1 drachma per day and total project budget was $300. While Miller did not consider it a success, later scholars found it significant in solving problems connected to the Greek stage.

At the conclusion of the academic year, Miller set off on a walking tour he hoped would take him all the way to Istanbul, visiting archaeological sites along the way. He did not get beyond the further slope of one of the mountain ranges which encircle Athens. On only his second day out, he was robbed, beaten unconscious, and left for dead by two local villagers. The bloodied Miller managed to return to Athens to lodge a complaint with the local authorities. The authorities thereupon commissioned Miller as a captain in the Greek army, and sent him out with a posse to apprehend the criminals. A few days later the brigands were in jail. To his credit, Miller altered his testimony at their trial so the two would not be sentenced to death. They were, however, sentenced to ten years in a prison on the island of Aegina.

== Start of career ==
Miller returned to the United States as an instructor of Greek at the University of Michigan during the 1886–87 school year and of Latin and Sanskrit in the 1887–88 year, beginning a fifty-year career as a college professor – without ever returning to finish his doctoral degree. Walter Miller married Jennie Emerson, niece of Ralph Waldo Emerson, on September 13, 1888, in Racine, Wisconsin. Jennie Emerson Miller (August 7, 1860 – March 1, 1946) had studied Latin, Greek, Sanskrit, French, German and science and was an invaluable assistant to her husband. By 1889 Walter Miller was an acting assistant professor at Michigan, but the family returned to Leipzig for the next two years and daughters Edith and Marjorie were born in Germany. He worked as the senior at the Royal Archaeological Seminary at the University of Leipzig from 1890 to 1891.

The family returned to Columbia, Missouri, when he accepted a position as an associate professor of Greek at the University of Missouri for the 1891–92 school year. In the fall of 1891, Miller received both a letter and a telegram from Stanford University President David Starr Jordan offering him a position with the newly formed Classics Department. A quick discussion with the executive committee of the Missouri Board of Curators resulted in a promotion in both rank and salary, with the promise of a full professorship of archaeology the next academic year. Nonetheless, in 1892 he was appointed professor of Latin and archaeology at Stanford University.

Miller, his wife Jennie and his two daughters Edith and Marjorie built a house at 2275 Amherst Street in the College Terrace neighborhood of Palo Alto, California. For the next ten years he served Stanford, as professor of archaeology (1894–96), professor of classical philology (1896–1902) and also as secretary of the faculty from 1897 to 1901. With differing views from the departmental administration on the future of the classics department, and determined to continue publishing, he voluntarily resigned in 1902. Correspondence with President Jordan indicates an amicable departure.

As professor of Greek, and later philology at the Tulane University, he began his administrative experience, becoming dean of the graduate school and later dean of the College of Arts and Sciences. At the same time his editorial endeavors began, with the Southern Educational Review and later the Classical Journal.

Miller typically traveled alone over summer term vacations while Jennie stayed at home and with the two daughters. In the summer of 1910 he was in the Grecian Isles aboard the yacht Athena, lecturing for the Society of University Travel. Jennie, elder daughter Edith and younger daughter Marjorie were visiting the Tallulah River in North Georgia as they did each summer to escape the New Orleans heat. On the evening of May 29, near the town of Tallulah Falls, Marjorie (a strong swimmer) was swept away by the current and drowned. Her father had just set sail from Naples and was notified by a cablegram that said simply "COME HOME AT ONCE." The body was recovered days later and Miller notified of the tragedy only upon his arrival in New York. Funeral services were held in Atlanta on September 3 and the burial was at sea (according to her wishes) on September 29.

In 1911 he returned to the University of Missouri as professor of Latin and in 1929 became professor of classical languages and archaeology. From 1914 to 1930 he was the dean of the Graduate School at the University of Missouri and during World War I served in the YMCA in France and was a regional director of the YMCA in Italy. In his 1919 commencement address he called for the creation of a Memorial Student Union building to honor the fallen of World War I. In September 1932, he was awarded an honorary Doctor of Letters by his alma mater the University of Michigan, and he retired to his home at 1516 Wilson Avenue in Columbia, Missouri, in 1936. After his retirement, he taught at Southwestern in Memphis and also Washington University in St. Louis.

== Later years ==
In 1944 in his capacity as a professor emeritus at Missouri and at age 80, he completed the translation of Homer's Iliad in the English equivalent of the Greek poet's original dactylic hexameter. It was the first such work ever published. Begun by Tulane colleague William Benjamin Smith this work was hailed as a "triumph of ingenuity." Five years later Miller died in Columbia, Missouri, one of the last of his generation of U.S. classicists.

The Walter Miller Library in the Department of Classical Studies and the Walter Miller Fellowship endure to this day. Jennie was a charter member of the Beta chapter of the Gamma Phi Beta social sorority at the University of Michigan in 1882, and in 1921 a founder of the Alpha Delta chapter at the University of Missouri. Alpha Delta presents the Jennie Emerson Miller award each year.

== Works ==
Books and Monographs

- The Theater of Thoricus (papers of the American School of Classical Studies, Athens, Vol. IV., 1888).
- Latin Prose Composition for College Use, Leach, Shewell and Sanborn, Boston and New York, Part I (1890), Part II (1891).
- Key to Latin Prose Composition, 1894.
- Pausanias and His Guidebook, 1894.
- History of the Akropolis of Athens, 1894.
- "The Old and the New," Commencement address, Stanford University, 1898.
- Georg Wilhelm Steller, De Bestiis Marinis (The Beasts of the Sea). Translated with Jennie Emerson Miller. In an appendix to The Fur Seals and Fur-Seal Islands of the North Pacific Ocean, edited by David Starr Jordan, Part 3 (Washington, 1899), pp. 179–218.
- Marcus Tullius Cicero, De Officiis (On Duties), translated by Walter Miller. Harvard University Press, 1913, ISBN 978-0-674-99033-3, ISBN 0-674-99033-1
- Xenophon, Cyropaedia, translated by Walter Miller. Harvard University Press, Cambridge, 1914, ISBN 978-0-674-99057-9, ISBN 0-674-99057-9 (books 1-5) and ISBN 978-0-674-99058-6, ISBN 0-674-99058-7 (books 5-8).
- "Dulce et Decorum est pro Patria Mori," Commencement address, University of Missouri, 1919.
- Daedalus and Thespis, The Contribution of the Ancient Dramatic Poets to our Knowledge of the Arts and Crafts of Greece, Volume I: Architecture and Topography: The Macmillan Co., New York, 1929.
- The Iliad of Homer: A Line for Line Translation in Dactylic Hexameters. With William Benjamin Smith. Macmillan, New York, 1944.

Articles

- Excavations Upon the Akropolis at Athens. (American Journal of Archaeology), 1886
- Johannes Overbeck, Necrology. (American Journal of Archaeology), 1894
- Scientific Names of Latin and Greek Derivation, reprinted from the Proceedings of the California Academy of Sciences, 3rd ser., Zoology, vol. 1. San Francisco, 1897
- The Roman Religion. Progress (The University Association, Chicago), 1897
- The New Commissioner of Education (Elmer Ellsworth Brown). Southern Education Review, 1906.
- The Pronunciation of Greek and Latin Proper Names in English. Classical Journal, 1935

Journals

- Associate Editor of the Southern Educational Review, 1905–1912.
- Associate Editor of the Classical Journal, 1905–1933.
- Editor-in-Chief of the Classical Journal, 1933–1935.

Editor

- International's World Reference Encyclopedia
- Standard American Encyclopedia, 1937.

== See also ==
- English translations of Homer: Walter Miller
