= William Benjamin Smith =

American professor of mathematics

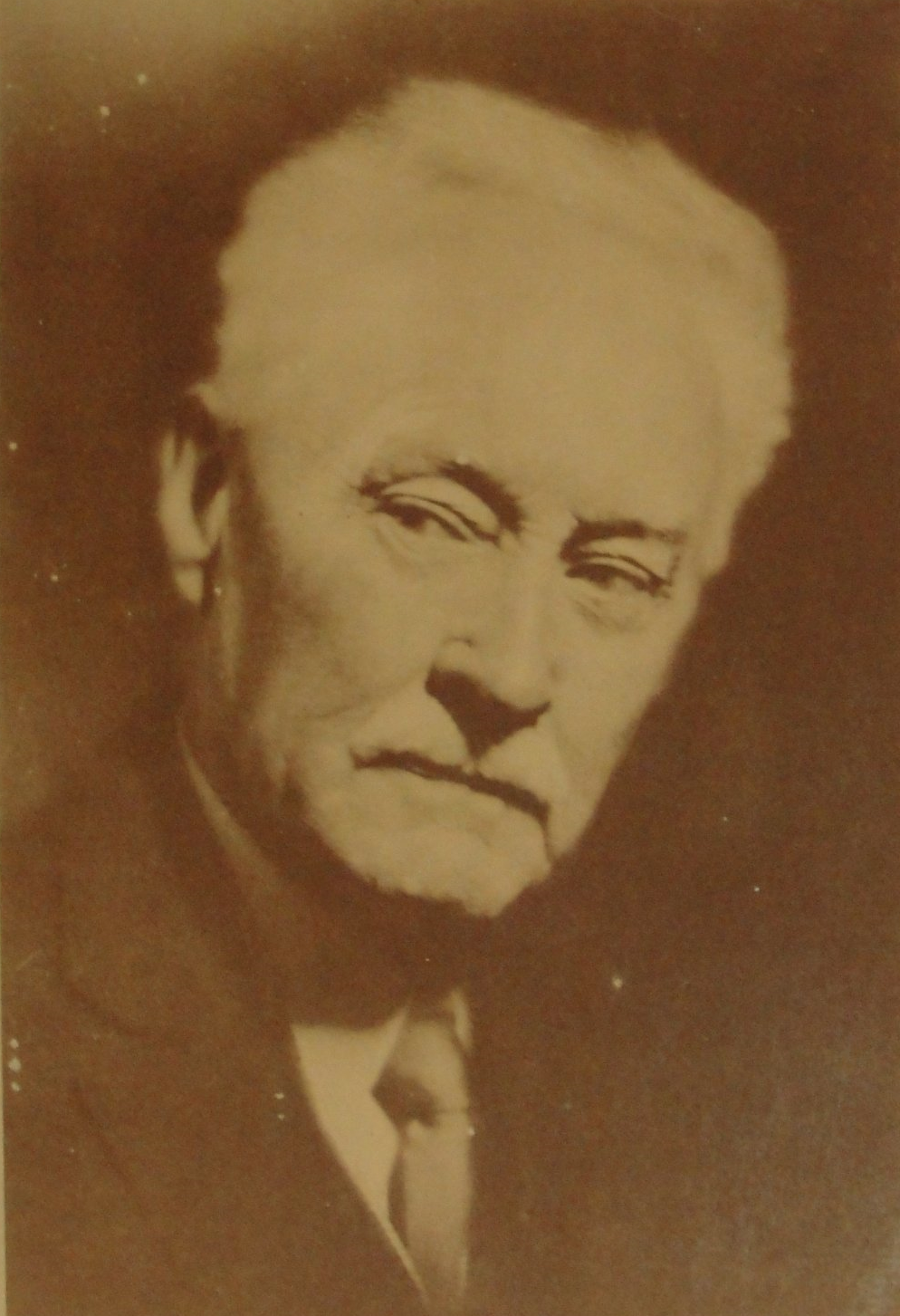
- Born: October 26, 1850; Stanford, Kentucky
- Died: August 6, 1934 (aged 83); Columbia, Missouri
- Occupations: Mathematician, writer

William Benjamin Smith (October 26, 1850 – August 6, 1934) was a professor of mathematics at Tulane University, best known as a proponent of the Christ myth theory.

== Biography ==
In a series of books, beginning with Ecce Deus: The Pre-Christian Jesus, published in 1894, and ending with The Birth of the Gospel, published posthumously in 1954, Smith argued that the earliest Christian sources, particularly the Pauline epistles, stress Christ's divinity at the expense of any human personality, and that this would have been implausible, if there had been a human Jesus. Smith therefore argued that Christianity's origins lay in a pre-Christian Jesus cult—that is, a Jewish sect had worshipped a divine being Jesus in the centuries before the human Jesus was supposedly born. Evidence for this cult was found in Hippolytus' mention of the Naassenes and Epiphanius' report of a Nasarene sect that existed before Christ, as well as passages in Acts. The seemingly historical details in the New Testament were built by the early Christian community around narratives of the pre-Christian Jesus.

Smith also argued against the historical value of non-Christian writers regarding Jesus, particularly Josephus and Tacitus.

Infamously, Smith was also a white supremacy advocate whose book The Color Line: A Brief on Behalf of the Unborn (1905) argued for the racial inferiority of Negroes. He unsuccessfully challenged the studies of races by American anthropologist Franz Boas.

== Translator ==
Upon his death in 1934, Smith left a partial translation of Homer's Iliad. This work was completed by his old Tulane colleague Walter Miller and when published in 1944 was the first English translation in the original dactylic hexameter.

== Publications ==
Books

- Elementary Co-Ordinate Geometry for Collegiate Use and Private Study (Boston: Ginn & Company, 1886)
- James Sidney Rollins: Memoir (New York: De Vinne Press, 1891)
- Introductory Modern Geometry of Point, Ray, and Circle (New York: Macmillan & Co, 1893)
- Color Line: A Brief on Behalf of the Unborn (New York: McClure, Phillips & Company, 1905)
- Der Vorchristliche Jesus (Giessen: Töpelmann, 1906) [with an introduction by Paul Wilhelm Schmiedel]
- The Silence of Josephus & Tacitus (Chicago: Open Court Publishing Company, 1910)
- Ecce Deus: Studies of Primitive Christianity (Open Court Publishing Company, 1913)
- The Birth of the Gospel: A Study of the Origin and Purport of the Primitive Allegory of the Jesus (1957) [edited by Addison Gulick]

Papers

- Smith, William Benjamin. (1903). The Pauline Manuscripts F and G. A Text-Critical Study. The American Journal of Theology 7 (3): 452-485.
- Smith, William Benjamin. (1911). The Pre-Christian Jesus. The American Journal of Theology 15 (2): 259-265.
- Smith, William Benjamin. (1914). Latest Lights and Shadows on the Jesus Question. The Monist 24 (4): 618-634.
- Smith, William Benjamin. (1919). What Remaineth? The Monist 29 (1): 1-31.

== See also ==
- Christ myth theory
