= Paul Wilhelm Schmiedel =

German theologian (1851–1935)

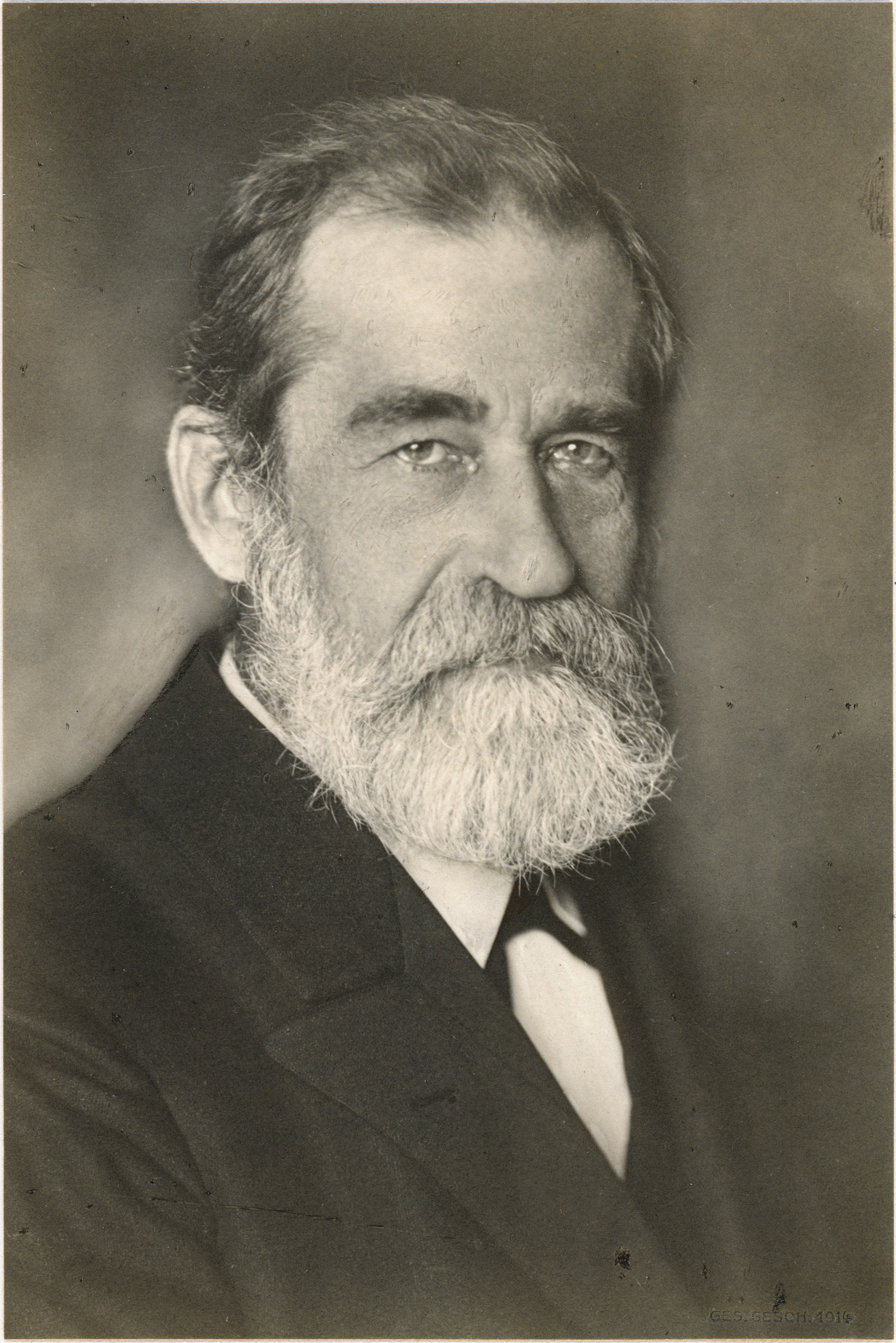
Paul Wilhelm Schmiedel

Paul Wilhelm Schmiedel (December 22, 1851 – April 10, 1935) was a German theologian and professor of New Testament exegesis born in Zaukeroda (Zauckerode, now a part of Freital, Saxony) near Dresden.

He studied theology in Jena, where he had as instructors Otto Pfleiderer (1839–1908) and Richard Adelbert Lipsius (1830–1892). In 1879 he received his habilitation, and from 1893 to 1923 was a full professor at the University of Zurich.

Schmiedel was the author of "The Johannine Writings" (Evangelium, Briefe und Offenbarung des Johannes nach ihrer Entstehung und Bedeutung, translated into English in 1908) and an 1894 revision of Georg Benedikt Winer's Grammatik des neutestamentlichen Sprachidioms. He also made important contributions to the Encyclopaedia Biblica.
