= Thomas Whittaker (metaphysician) =

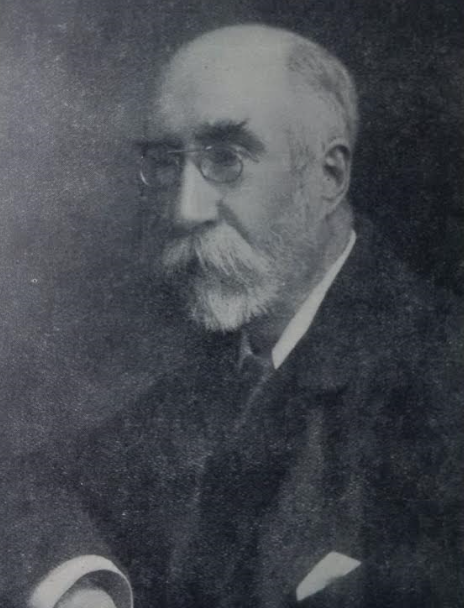
- Born: 25 September 1856
- Died: 3 October 1935 (aged 79)
- Education: Dublin Royal College of Science; Exeter College, Oxford
- Occupations: Metaphysician, critic

Thomas Whittaker (25 September 1856 – 3 October 1935) was an English metaphysician and critic.

== Biography ==
Whittaker was educated at Dublin Royal College of Science and Exeter College, Oxford. He was an editor of the journal Mind (1885-1891). He won a Natural Science scholarship at Exeter College. From 1910 he was director of the Rationalist Press Association.

Whittaker was an advocate of the Christ myth theory. He was influenced by the writings of Willem Christiaan van Manen and J. M. Robertson.

== Works ==
- The Philosophy of History (1893)
- The Neoplatonists: A Study in the History of Hellenism (1901), third impression 1928
- Origins of Christianity (1904), fourth edition 1933
- Apollonius of Tyana and Other Essays (1906)
- The Liberal State (1907)
- Schopenhauer (1909)
- Priests, Philosophers, and Prophets (1911)
- The Theory of Abstract Ethics (1916)
- The Metaphysics of Evolution (1926)
- His Prolegomena to a New Metaphysic (1931)
- Reason (1934)

He wrote several lives for the Dictionary of National Biography, signing as T. W-r.

- Thomas Bedwell
- William Bewley
- John Bonnycastle
- Henry Briggs (1561–1630)
