= Samuel Lublinski =

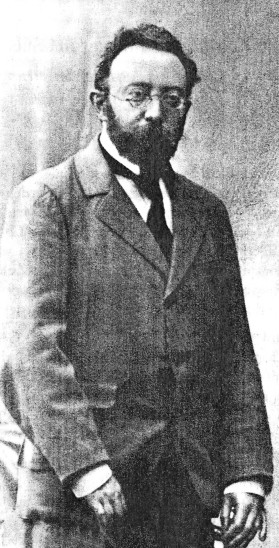
- Born: 18 February 1868; Pisz, Poland
- Died: 26 December 1910 (aged 42); Weimar, Germany
- Occupations: Literary historian, philosopher of religion

Samuel Lublinski (18 February 1868 – 26 December 1910) was a Berlin-based writer, literary historian, critic, and philosopher of religion. He was a pioneer of the socio-historical study of literary movements and a major contributor to the debates about German-Jewish national and cultural identity of the era.

== Life ==
Lublinski was born in Johannisburg, East Prussia (now Pisz, Poland). He came from a secular German Jewish family, and was the son of a businessman. He studied at several schools in Königsberg, but was repeatedly forced to leave because of his argumentative character.

In 1887, he moved to Verona to work for the bookseller Leo Olschki. Lublinski later moved to Venice. In 1892 he returned to Germany and set up independently as a bookseller in Heidelberg, but in 1895 finally abandoned his profession to become a full-time writer. From 1895 he moved to Berlin, becoming a journalist and essayist on numerous topics. His first book was Jewish characters in Grillparzer, Hebbel and Otto Ludwig (1899). His first truly important work was the four volume Litteratur und Gesellschaft (Literature and Society) (1899/1900), which examines the origin and development of Romanticism in German literature, and explores the social and cultural context in which it came into being. It is considered the first "sociological" account of literature in Germany. He followed this with Die Bilanz der Moderne (1904) and Der Ausgang der Moderne (1909), which articulated his personal views of naturalism and neo-romanticism.

Lublinski subsequently tried his hand as a playwright, but was not successful. Of his six plays only the last, Kaiser und Kanzler (1910) was ever produced - in 1913, three years after his death. One of the others, Gunther und Brunhild, is an alternative take on the Niebelungenlied in which the conflict between the main characters becomes a psychological drama.

Lublinski was also a proponent of the Christ myth theory, the denial of the historical existence of Jesus. In his last years he researched his unfinished project Der urchristliche Erdkreis und sein Mythus, publishing a series of booklets and essays in 1910 in which he argued that Christianity emerged from a fusion of late Judaism with Oriental and Hellenistic mystery cults. He also denied the historicity of Paul.

== Zionism and feuds ==
Lublinski was initially a staunch supporter of Zionism and was a regular contributor to Theodor Herzl's periodical Die Welt using the pseudonym Solomon Liebhardt. However, he later withdrew from the journal when he came to identify more as "a German than a thoroughbred Jew"; he felt himself to be German "from psychological force", not merely from "theoretical conviction". As a result, he believed that he could not identify with any other nationality. He remained a supporter of Zionism, but believed that he could never go to live in Palestine himself. In letters to Herzl written in May 1899 he explained his position, asserting that he did not want to fully assimilate into German identity, but could not imagine himself owing allegiance to another nation. After 1901, however, he argued for full assimilation of German Jews.

Lublinski became embroiled in several literary and intellectual feuds, particularly about claims of writers to priority in various fields. The biggest feud was with Theodor Lessing, progenitor of the concept of "self-hating" Jews, who published an extremely sharp satire on Lublinski, starting with derisory comments about his "little beautiful" appearance. The attack led to an equally sharply worded response from Thomas Mann, creating a literary scandal in 1910.

Lublinski was working on a new play about Rienzi and various other projects when he died suddenly on 26 December 1910 while staying with his sister in Weimar.

== Works ==
- Der Antisemitismus, 1896
- Jüdische Charaktere bei Grillparzer, Hebbel und Otto Ludwig. Litterarische Studien, Berlin 1899
- Litteratur und Gesellschaft im 19. Jahrhundert, 4 Bände, Berlin 1899–1900
- Charles Darwin. Eine Apologie und eine Kritik, Leipzig o. J. (ca. 1900)
- Der Imperator, 1901 (Tragedy)
- Gescheitert, 1901 (Novel)
- Die Entstehung des Judentums. Eine Skizze, Berlin 1903
- Die Bilanz der Moderne, Berlin 1904
- Vom unbekannten Gott. Ein Baustein, Dresden 1904
- Friedrich Schiller. Seine Entstehung und seine Zukunft, Berlin o. J. (1905)
- Peter von Russland, 1906 (Tragedy)
- Die Humanität als Mysterium, Jena 1907
- Gunther und Brunhild, Berlin 1908 (Drama)
- Shakespeares Problem im Hamlet, Leipzig 1908
- Der Ausgang der Moderne. Ein Buch der Opposition, Dresden 1909
- Die Entstehung des Christentums aus der antiken Kultur, Jena 1910
- Das werdende Dogma vom Leben Jesu, Jena 1910
- Der urchristliche Erdkreis und sein Mythos, 1910
- Falsche Beweise für die Existenz des Menschen Jesus, Leipzig 1910
- Kaiser und Kanzler, Leipzig 1910 (Tragedy)
- Teresa und Wolfgang, Berlin 1912
- Nachgelassene Schriften, München 1914
