= The Denial of the Historicity of Jesus in Past and Present =

1926 book by Arthur Drews

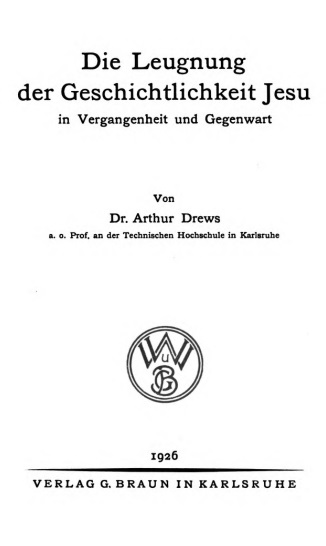
- Title page of the book published in 1926
- Author: Arthur Drews
- Original title: Die Leugnung der Geschichtlichkeit Jesu in Vergangenheit und Gegenwart
- Language: German
- Subject: Christ myth theory
- Genre: Non-fiction
- Publication date: 1926

Die Leugnung der Geschichtlichkeit Jesu in Vergangenheit und Gegenwart (English: The Denial of the Historicity of Jesus in Past and Present) was a 1926 book in German by Arthur Drews on Christ myth theory.

The book is a historical review of some 35 major deniers of Jesus historicity (radicals, mythicists) covering the period 1780 – 1926, and was meant to be Drews’s response to Albert Schweitzer's Quest of the Historical Jesus of 1906. Drews’s book was in fact presented in the guise of "Quest of the non-Historicity of Jesus", with its own historical review of the key Jesus deniers.

As Schweitzer erected himself as the champion of "historicists", Drews stood up in opposition as the champion of "radicals" and "Jesus historicity deniers". They were later labelled "mythicists" by the media, a name never used by Drews, but popularized in the early 1940s by the British writers A.D. Howell Smith, in his book Jesus Not A Myth (1942) and Archibald Robertson in his book Jesus: Myth or History? (1946). This new label was convenient in opposing "mythicists" versus "historicists".

== David Strauss and Bruno Bauer ==
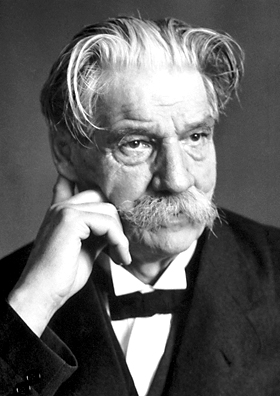
Albert Schweitzer, 1952 Nobel portrait, criticized the Lives of Jesus reconstructions

Drews gives the most prominent place to David Strauss, who reduced all the supernatural events of the New Testament stories to the role of myths; and to Bruno Bauer, the first professional scholar who denied the historicity of Jesus, argued the priority of Mark as inventor of the Gospel story and the fiction of Jesus's existence, rejected all of Paul's epistles as non genuine, and emphasized the input of Greco-Roman ideas (especially the Stoicism of Seneca) in the New Testament documents. Both Strauss and Bauer were forced to abandon University life at a young age.

== The five major Jesus Deniers who influenced Drews's Christ Myth ==
Among those Jesus deniers, Arthur Drews was especially influenced by the following thinkers:

- The German Bruno Bauer (1809–1882), the original pioneer of the denial of Jesus Historicity. See whole Ch. XI "The First Skeptical Life of Jesus" dedicated to Bruno Bauer, in Albert Schweitzer's The Quest of the Historical Jesus (1906).
- The German Albert Kalthoff (1850–1906):

- Die Entstehung des Christentums – Neue Beiträge zum Christusproblem, (1904), transl. The Rise of Christianity (1907);
- Was wissen wir von Jesus? Eine Abrechnung mit Wilhelm Bousset (1904) [What do We Know of Jesus? A Settlement with Wilhelm Bousset];
- Modernes Christentum (1906) [Modern Christendom].

- The American William Benjamin Smith (1850–1934), fluent in English and German, and close to Kalthoff:

- The Pre-Christian Jesus, Studies of Origins of Primitive Christianity (1906/1911);
- Ecce Deus: Studies Of Primitive Christianity, Introd. Paul Wilhelm Schmiedel (1912).

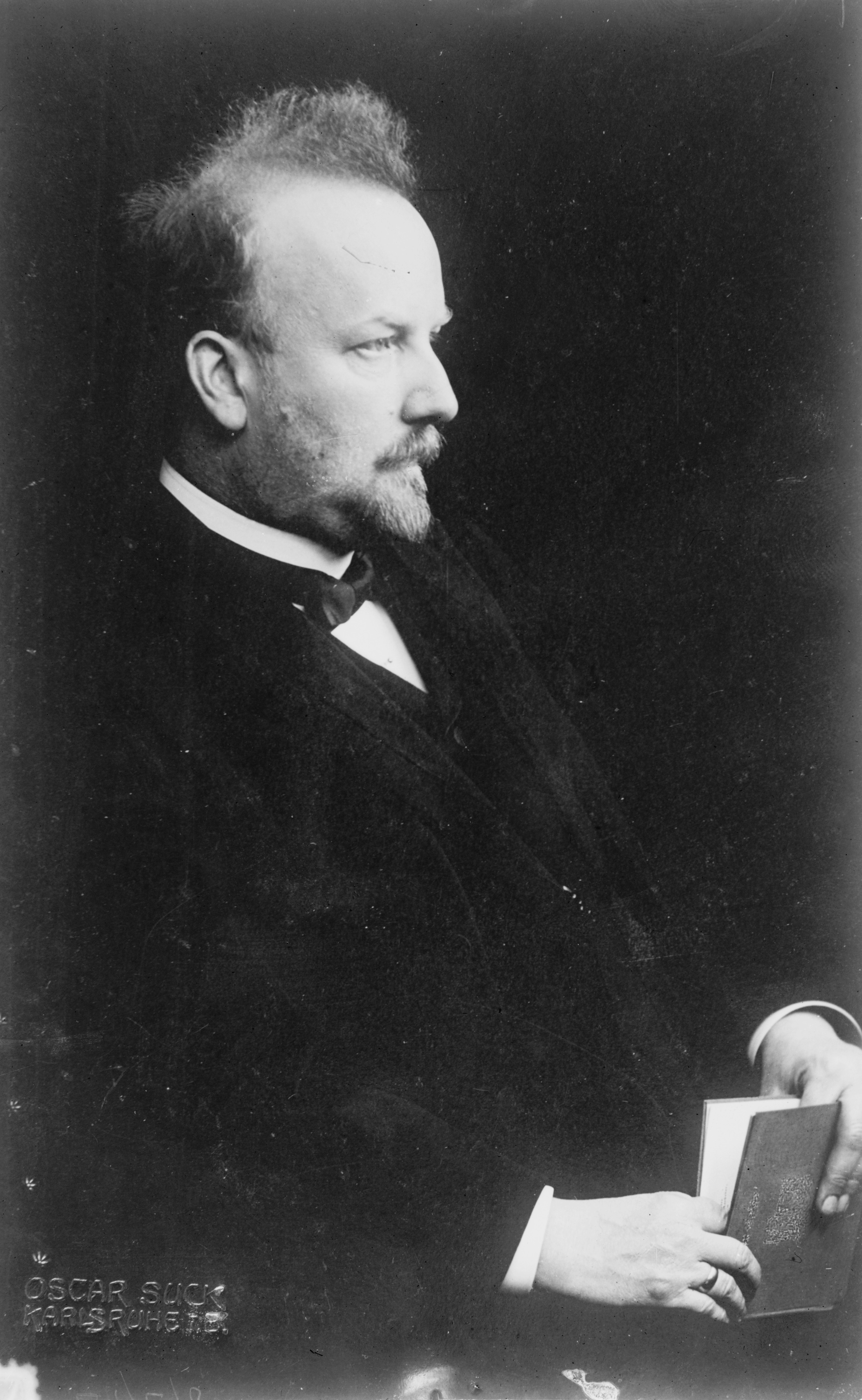
Arthur Drews

- The Scot J. M. Robertson (1856–1933):

- Christianity and Mythology (1900–10);
- A Short History of Christianity (1902);
- Pagan Christs – Studies in Comparative Hierology (1903–1911).

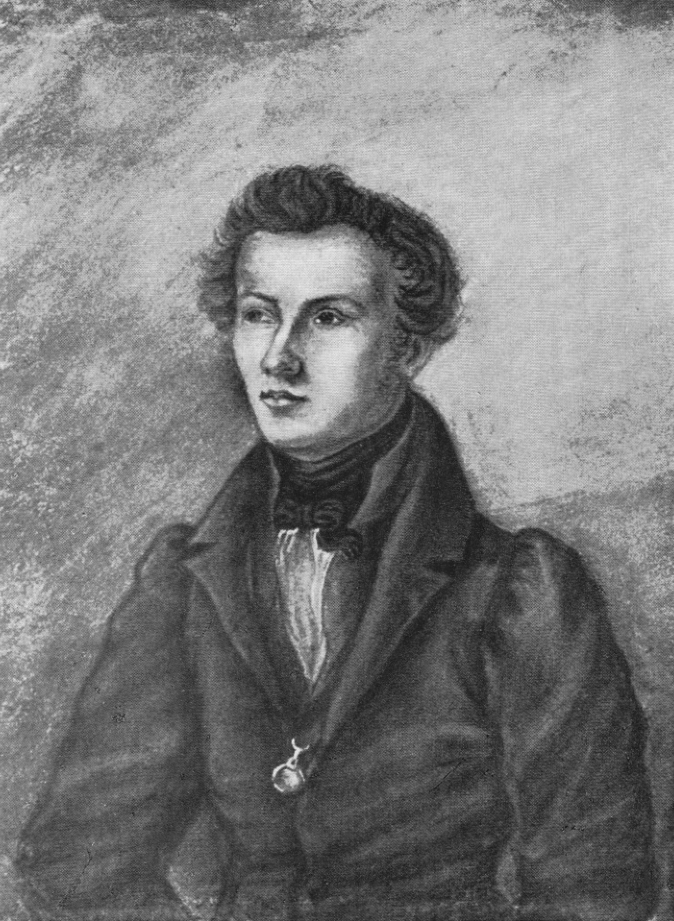
Bruno Bauer, German founder of the Christ Myth thesis

- The Englishman Thomas Whittaker (1856–1935): The Origins of Christianity (1904), declaring Jesus a myth.

== School of comparative history of religions ==
Space is dedicated to the major advocates of the School of (Comparative) History of Religions, flourishing in Germany (Die Religionsgeschichtliche Schule) and the United Kingdom. German orientalist Peter Jensen, an expert on Semitic Languages and Babylonian literature, in Das Gilgamesch-Epos in der Weltliteratur, (Part I, 1906 & Part II, 1928) [The Epic of Gilgamesh in World Literature], had analyzed the Epic of Gilgamesh, and found parallels in all later ANE myths, including the Hebrew Tanakh, Moses and Isaiah, thus impacting on the authenticity of the Christian Gospels and destroyed the unique character of the Jesus story. Alfred Jeremias (1864–1935), another expert in ANE languages and mythology, had published The Epic of Gilgamesh (1891) and advocated panbabylonism, the thesis that sees the Ancient Hebrew stories directly derived from Babylonian mythology. The English summary (by Klaus Schilling) of The Denial of the Historicity of Jesus describes Jeremias's views:

[Jeremias] only admitted Chaldean origin of early Judaism, but couldn't deny that there was some sort of impact from old Babylon in the New Testament. The Babylonian-Chaldean worldview is about the most astralmythical and astrological worldview found in history of cultures; the terms 'astrological' and 'Chaldean' were used synonymously by many authors since Hellenic times. In this sense Jeremias continued the works of Volney and Dupuis... The Christian calendar tells the story of the astral redeemer king, the 12 apostles are akin to the zodiac, and the 4 Gospels are akin to the cardinal points of the world.

== The Dutch Radical School ==
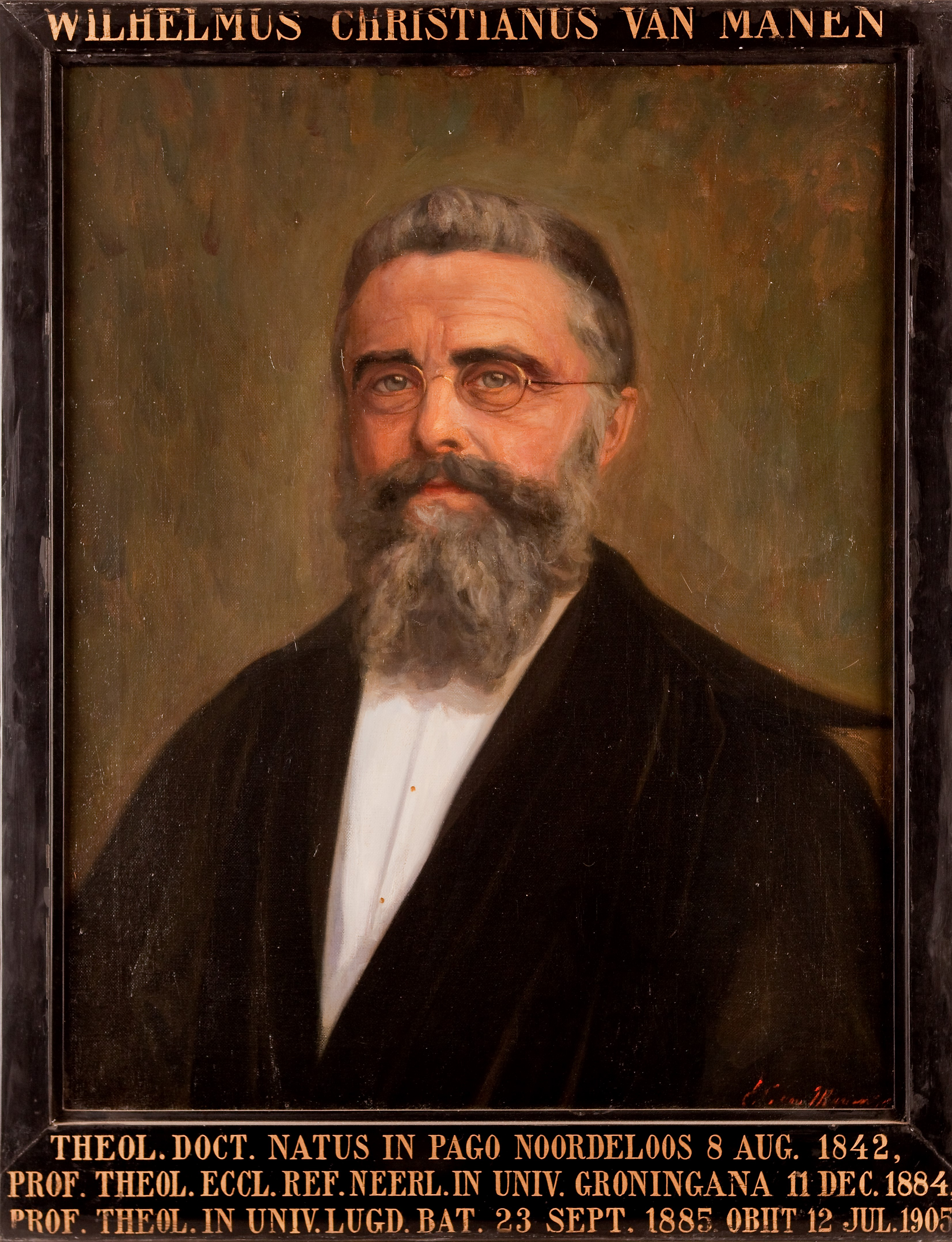
Willem Christiaan van Manen, Collection Leiden Un

Drews was closely connected to what was called the school of Dutch “Radical Criticism”, which not only denied the existence of Jesus Christ, the authenticity of Paul's epistles, and also the very historicity of Paul. Drews reviews the inputs from the key scholars:

- Allard Pierson (1831–1896): De Bergrede en andere synoptische Fragmenten (1878) [The Sermon on the Mount and other Synoptic Fragments], was epoch-making. It proved that the Sermon on the Mount is a post-70 product, a collection of aphorisms of Jewish wisdom placed into the mouth of the semi-god Jesus. Non-Christian witnesses are worthless, especially Tacitus. The Galatians epistle is not genuine (contrary to F.C. Baur and Tübingen School). Non-historicity of Jesus is affirmed. Pierson is recognized as the founder of the Dutch Radical School.
- Abraham Dirk Loman (1823–1897): Quaestiones Paulinae (1882–1886) [Questions on the Paulinae] contends that not only Galatians, but all of Paul's Epistles are 2nd-century forgeries (following Bruno Bauer). No evidence of the Paulinae before Marcion, the epistles are Gnostic treatises. Jesus is a 2nd-century fiction. "Some" Jesus may have existed, but buried and lost in the dark. The Jesus of Christianity is an ideal symbol, a non-historical construction.
- Samuel Adrianus Naber (1828–1913): Christianity mixed Jewish and Roman-Hellenic thoughts. Greek myths have been fused with Isaiah. Naber also supports the non-historicity of Jesus.
- Willem Christiaan van Manen (1842–1905): Paulus (1890–1896). Agrees with Loman and Rudolf Steck that none of the epistles is genuine. Acts are dependent on Flavius Josephus and date from c. 125–150. As an exception in the Dutch Radical School, does accept the historicity of Jesus.
- Rudolf Steck (1842–1924): a Swiss scholar, an ally of the Dutch. In Der Galaterbrief nach seiner Echtheit untersucht nebst kritischen Bemerkungen zu den Paulinischen Hauptbriefen (1888) [Inquiry into the Genuineness of the Galatians Epistle, and Critical Remarks on the Chief Paulines], he branded all the Pauline epistles as fakes, and supported Pierson and Naber.
- G.J.P.J. Bolland (1854–1922): De Evangelische Jozua (1907) [The Gospel of Joshua] continued Bauer's concepts about Philo and his Logos, the Caesars, and earlier Jewish Gnosticism. Christianity is the result of syncretism between Hellenized Jews and Judeophile Greeks in Alexandria after 70, with "Chrestos" (the good) becoming "Christus", i.e., Jesus. The original Jerusalem mother community is mere fiction. Bolland also maintains the non-historicity of Jesus.
- G. A. van den Bergh van Eysinga (1874–1957): the last of the line to hold a professorship. His important writings came after 1926. Van Eysinga endorses the view that the epistles of Clement and Ignatius of Antioch are not genuine. There is no evidence of the Paulinae before Marcion, all produced by the Marcion circle. Paul does not sound Jewish, (in opposition to Harnack). Paul's epistles are full of incongruities. There's no evidence of the existence of Jesus the Messiah.
  In 1930, van Eysinga dedicated an article to Arthur Drews, "Does Jesus Live, or Has He Only Lived? A Study of the Doctrine of Historicity", commenting on Drews's 1926 book The Denial of the Historicity of Jesus in Past and Present
  Van Eysinga expressed his conviction that the Jesus movement had started as a mystery cult in his article Das Christentum als MysterienReligion (1950, "Christianity as a Mystery Cult").

The attention to Drews and the Dutch School was revived by Hermann Detering and his Website, Radikalkritik in German and English.

== Reviews of other historicity deniers ==
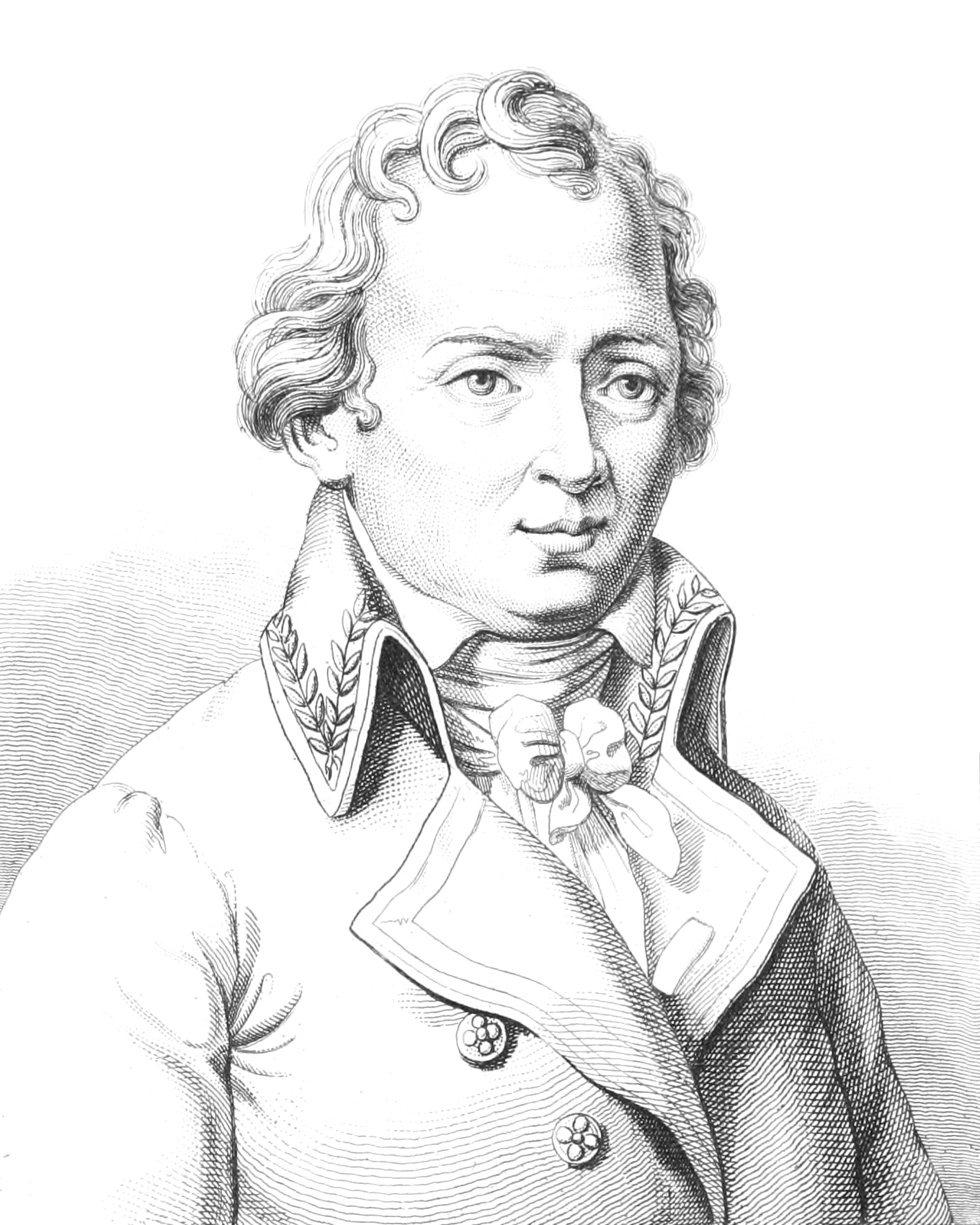
Charles-François Dupuis

Drews gives credit to the two French pioneers, Charles-François Dupuis and Comte de Volney, both imbued with an astral-mythical interpretation of Jesus and Christianity.

Drews does mention the broad impact of Ernest Renan (1823–1892), with his immensely popular Romanticist Vie de Jesus (1863, Life of Jesus), in implanting serious doubts among the bourgeoisie. But Drews is less impressed by Renan as a scholar than Schweitzer was, who had devoted a full chapter (13) to the French "theology historian", a space equal to that devoted to Bauer.

The prevailing term then was radicalism, and Drews lends special attention to the adherents of Radicalism in Germany, the US, France, and England, and to a few other scholars, now less well remembered, but who made an insightful contribution in their time. Drews includes in his survey:

- Hermann Reimarus (1694–1768), a teacher of Oriental languages in Hamburg, and whom Schweitzer enshrined as the original German skeptic of the divinity of Jesus in his 1906 Quest of the Historical Jesus – From Reimarus to Wrede.
- Edwin Johnson (1842–1901), and his Antiqua mater – A Study of Christian Origins (1887). An English radical theologian who identified the early Christians as the "Chrestiani", followers of a good (Chrestus) God who had expropriated the myth of Dionysus "Eleutherios" ("Dionysos the Emancipator"), to produce a self-sacrificing Godman. Johnson denounced the twelve apostles as complete fabrication.
- The Pole Andrzej Niemojewski (1864–1921, Warsaw), Gott Jesus im Lichte fremder und eigener Forschungen samt Darstellung der evangelischen Astralstoffe, Astralszenen, und Astralsysteme, (1910), [Research on the Gospels' astralmythic aspects of the Jesus God]. He continues the line of Volney and Dupuis, by looking for parallels in astral mythology, but turns out to be "too confusing".
- Samuel Lublinski (1868–1910), Die Entstehung des Christentums aus der antiken Kultur, (1910), [Origins of Christendom from the Ancient culture], and Das werdende Dogma vom Leben Jesu (1910), [The Dogmatic Emergence of the Life of Jesus], who saw Christianity arising from Gnosticism, a product of late Judaism shaped by the Hellenistic and Oriental mystery cults, with Essenes and the Therapeuts as pioneering sects.
- Hermann Raschke, (1887–1970) Die Werkstatt des Markusevangelisten (1924), [The Workshop of the Evangelist Mark]. A Lutheran minister, he claims that the Ancients did not share in our modern historical consciousness, and made no absolute separation between historicity and mythic description. Everything was understood magically and speculatively. He stresses that Bar Kochba is the only authentic Messiah identified in the 1st and 2nd centuries, with Rabbi Akiva the "false prophet" who endorsed him. Marcion's Evangelikon looks more like Mark than Luke, against Harnack (Eysinga). The Pauline Savior is the Gnostic Redeemer. Scholars like Harnack religiously follow Tertullian (assuming that only incarnation-in-the-flesh can guarantee Redemption for mankind).

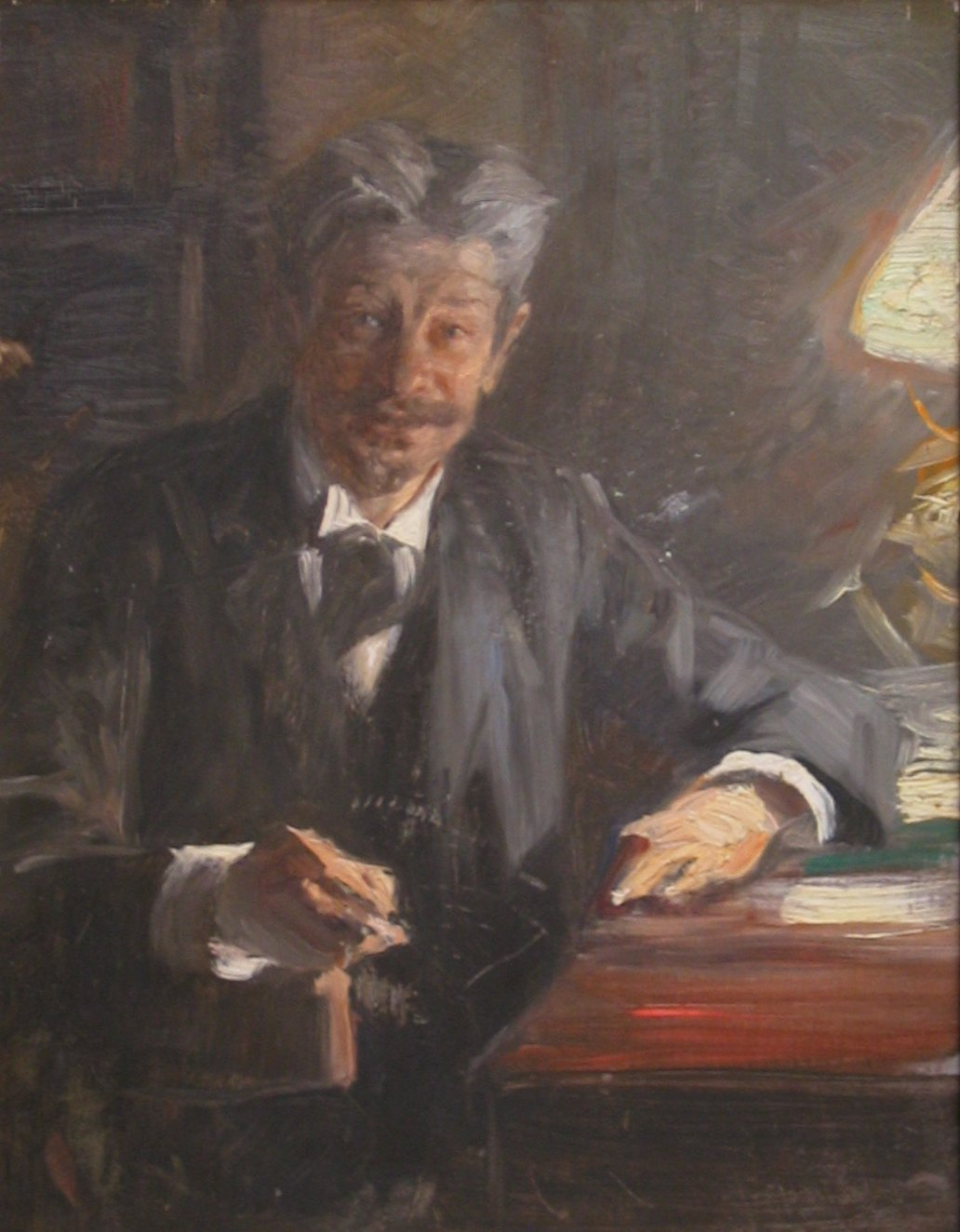
Georg Brandes, a sketch for a painting by P.S. Krøyer, 1900

- Emilio Bossi (1870–1920) (Jesus Christ Never Existed, 1904). Bossi was a radical lawyer/journalist ("Milesbo" being his pen-name). Jesus is a concoction from Tanakh and the mystery cults, and Jesus's ethics are a patchwork from Philo and Seneca.
- Paul-Louis Couchoud (1879–1959), The Enigma of Jesus (1924), with an introduction by James Frazer. This is only the first step in his exegesis, as his important works appeared after 1926.
- Georg Brandes (1842–1927), an influential Danish critic, published late in life his Die Jesus Sage (1925), transl. The Jesus Myth. Following Bruno Bauer, Brandes sees the order of NT writings as: Apocalypse of John, Paulinae, Gospels. Paul's Jesus is all celestial, and the Gospels are but an assemblage of midrash bits. Greco-Roman stoicism is a far superior kind of ethics to Jesus's morality.

With the Dane Georg Brandes, Drews ends his review in 1925, establishing the first historical list of the key radical/mythicists. This list has been brought up to date and expanded by later writers.

== Drew's conclusions on denial of Jesus' historicity ==
In his final conclusions ("English summary" of the book, by Klaus Schilling), Drews emphasized that deniers (radicals, mythicists) do not form a movement (a so-called "denial party") trying to “unite” them against an entity called “Christianity”:

Drews describes the social consequences of a denial of historicity, and explains why so many theologians and secular researchers stick to historicity, though the ahistoricity of Jesus is scientifically as sure as that of Romulus and Remus, or the seven legendary kings of Rome. The consequences are generally underestimated.
It is quite understandable that the denial party is unique only in that point [of the non-historicity, Ahistorizität], and otherwise offers a variety of diverging explanations [each denier has his own independent hypothesis]. The church has done everything for 2000 years to obscure and hide away the origins of Christianity, so that there’s no way to get any further without speculative hypotheses.
It is obvious that no serious researcher could claim the historicity of Jesus, unless it were the savior of the dominating religion of the prevailing culture. So there’s nothing but Christian prejudice which keeps even secular researchers from admitting non-historicity... [emphasis added]
