= The Letters of Paul in their Roman Literary Context =

2024 monograph challenging Pauline authorship

The Letters of Paul in their Roman Literary Context: Reassessing Apostolic Authorship
- Author: Nina E. Livesey
- Language: English
- Subject: Pauline epistles, pseudepigraphy, Roman literature, early Christianity
- Genre: Biblical studies
- Publisher: Cambridge University Press
- Publication date: 2024
- Publication place: United States
- Media type: Print, e-book
- Pages: xix + 324
- ISBN: 9781009487054
- OCLC: 1435146484

The Letters of Paul in their Roman Literary Context: Reassessing Apostolic Authorship is a 2024 scholarly monograph by American New Testament scholar Nina E. Livesey. The book proposes that the Pauline epistles, specifically the seven letters widely treated as authentic, are pseudonymous, literary compositions, likely produced in the mid-second-century (c. 144 AD) by Roman authors of the school of Marcion. Livesey argues that the letters function as didactic literature and compares their form and aims with Seneca's Moral Epistles. Another part of her argument is that Paul did not exist, a fringe view.

== Argument ==
Livesey opens by challenging the modern consensus that seven Pauline letters preserve genuine first century correspondence and argues for the fringe view that Paul did not exist. She summarizes the current consensus views by noting "Virtually without exception, modern Pauline scholars date Paul and his letters to the mid-first century CE." She recounts how nineteenth and twentieth century scholarship built the "authentic seven" canon by harmonizing the letters with Acts, appealing to stylistic impressions, and presuming a historical apostle — methods that were designed to protect the letters' status rather than to test it. She reviews early second century reception among Irenaeus, Tertullian, and the Valentinian teacher Ptolemy, arguing that their scriptural use of the letters stands closest to the letters' emergence and already treats them as authoritative literature rather than private mail. To situate her proposal, Livesey aligns it with earlier critics who attributed the letters to Marcion and his circle, including Dutch radicals such as Abraham Loman, S. A. Naber, and H. M. Bruins, modern heirs like Hermann Detering, and the American scholar and mythicist Robert M. Price. She labels the book's program "Dutch Radical Thought 3.0" in the introduction and emphasizes that reconstructions of Marcion's text by Tertullian, Epiphanius, and later researchers allow modern readers to recover the ten-letter collection that underpins her thesis.

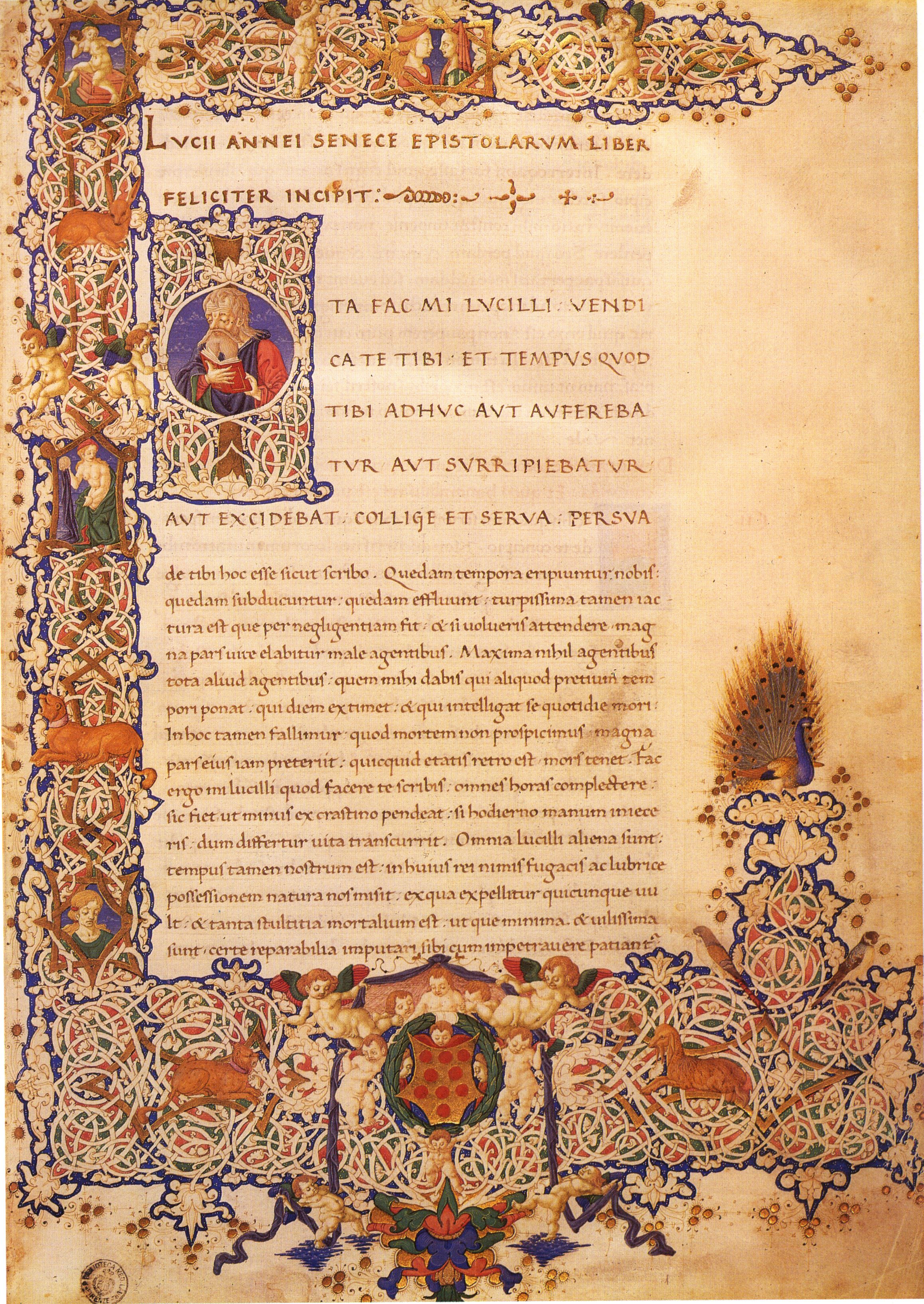
Manuscript of Seneca's Moral Epistles, Florence, Biblioteca Medicea Laurenziana, Plut. 45.33

From that background she situates the collection within mid second century Roman literary culture. Livesey draws on comparisons with Seneca's Moral Epistles and on Roman practices of collaborative composition, research assistants, and scribal helpers. She highlights educational exercises in prosopopoeia, the training of elite students to write in the voice of known figures, and Galen's description of Christian groups as schools, arguing these institutions supplied the techniques for composing Pauline-style instruction. She cites classicists such as Patricia Rosenmeyer and Abraham Malherbe to document these pedagogical practices.

Livesey then maps the social setting that made such work possible. She notes the influx of itinerant intellectuals to Rome around the Bar Kokhba revolt, the cross-fertilization among school heads named by Irenaeus, including Saturninus, Marcion, Tatian, Justin, and Valentinus, and the access these circles had to sources like the Septuagint. Within that network Marcion's wealth, shipping business, and education enabled him to lead a scribal school capable of producing a coordinated letter collection.

Livesey questions the historicity of the figure of Paul as reconstructed from the letters and from Acts. She also questions the historicity of the addressee communities and the likelihood that the letters are genuine first century correspondence.

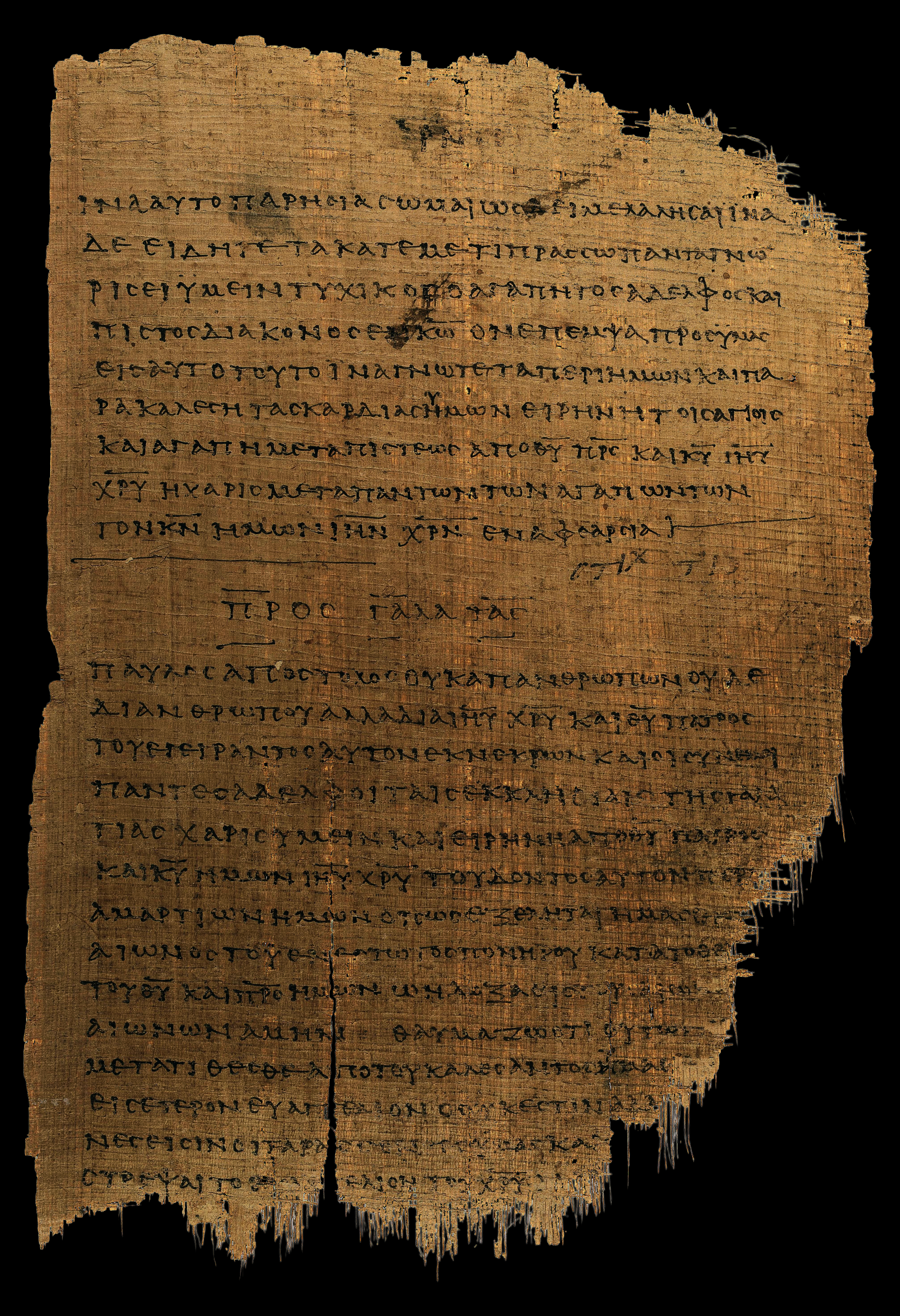
The end of Ephesians, continuing on to Galatians 1:1–8 on Papyrus 46 (fol. 158 recto; c. AD 200)

Placing the decisive events in the mid second century, Livesey dates Marcion's creation of the ten-letter Apostolikon to about 144 CE and argues that other supposed first century witnesses such as 1 Clement, the Ignatian epistles, Polycarp's letter to the Philippians, and 2 Peter can be redated to 140–150 CE. In Livesey's reconstruction this provenance also explains the letters' persistent polemics about law and circumcision. She reads Marcion's claim to have "found" Galatians, reported by Tertullian, as part of a pseudonymous game that masked collaborative composition. Justin Martyr's report that Marcion's community had "taken over the whole world" and Livesey's tally of fifteen anti-Marcionite writers before the second century ended illustrate how quickly the collection gained scriptural authority once it circulated.

Livesey explains variation inside the collection through the workings of a Marcionite school in which multiple authors produced letters under Marcion's direction. She invokes pedagogical exercises, the use of research assistants attested for Seneca, and the capacity of Roman scribal workshops to assemble large epistolary corpora. Drawing on scholars such as Hindy Najman, Irene Peirano Garrison, and Karel van der Toorn, she frames pseudonymous composition as a recognized rhetorical strategy rather than deceit. The interplay of Acts' narrative persona of Paul and the letters' didactic voice exemplifies what she calls "scripture in the making," in which pseudonymous authorship was a positive literary practice rather than a deceptive fraud.

== Reception ==
New Testament historian Paula Fredriksen wrote that "Nina observes that the letters mobilize literary tropes, and that literary tropes are used in fiction. The epistles use these tropes as techniques of verisimilitude, she says, to present themselves as if they were letters. This argument seems to assume that if something can be used in fiction, then it is fiction. But her chief comparanda are the (authentic) writings of Seneca, the Epistulae morales. She concludes that the one (Paul’s letters) are fictive, the other (Seneca) factual, but that “both operate by the same rhetorical principle,” in this instance the creation of the character of the inscribed letter senders (p. 185). So literary is not necessarily fictive. True for Seneca; true too, I submit, for Paul." She also questioned Livesey's dating of the letters, pointing that it would be unlikely for a mid-second century author to put into the mouth of a supposed first-century fictive character statements of an expectation that the world would end and Christ would return imminently.

In a review for the Journal for the Study of the New Testament, biblical scholar Donghyun Jeong stated that "Livesey is less convincing in completely disproving the “authentic-letter perspective” than in demonstrating that the Pauline letters are literary-rhetorical constructs." Jeong argued that placing the Pauline letters within their broader literary-cultural context does not necessarily imply that they are pseudepigraphical or that the "occasional discourse" found in them is entirely fictitious, noting that Seneca's letters were written by Seneca himself. He also said that Livesey’s hypothesis for a post-Bar-Kokhba dating of the letters relies on prioritizing polemical passages opposing circumcision while ignoring other texts in which Paul affirms God's election of Israel and defends the holiness and goodness of the Law.

American New Testament scholar M. David Litwa published a review on his professional site in July 2025. Litwa accepted that Livesey "successfully argues that one cannot use Paul's letters as proof for the historicity of their claimed author," but noted that "she has not proved that Paul didn't exist." He characterized her criterion of external verification as "reasonable, but perhaps too strict," given that many church historical figures lack attestation outside ecclesiastical sources. One commentator also observed that the letters' elaborate details seem unusual for fabricated correspondence, noting they contain "doctrinally irrelevant folksy details" that differ from typical ancient pseudepigraphic practices.

== See also ==
- Authorship of the Pauline epistles
- Marcion and Marcionism
- Seneca the Younger, Moral Epistles
