= Arthur Drews =

German writer, historian and philosopher (1865–1935)

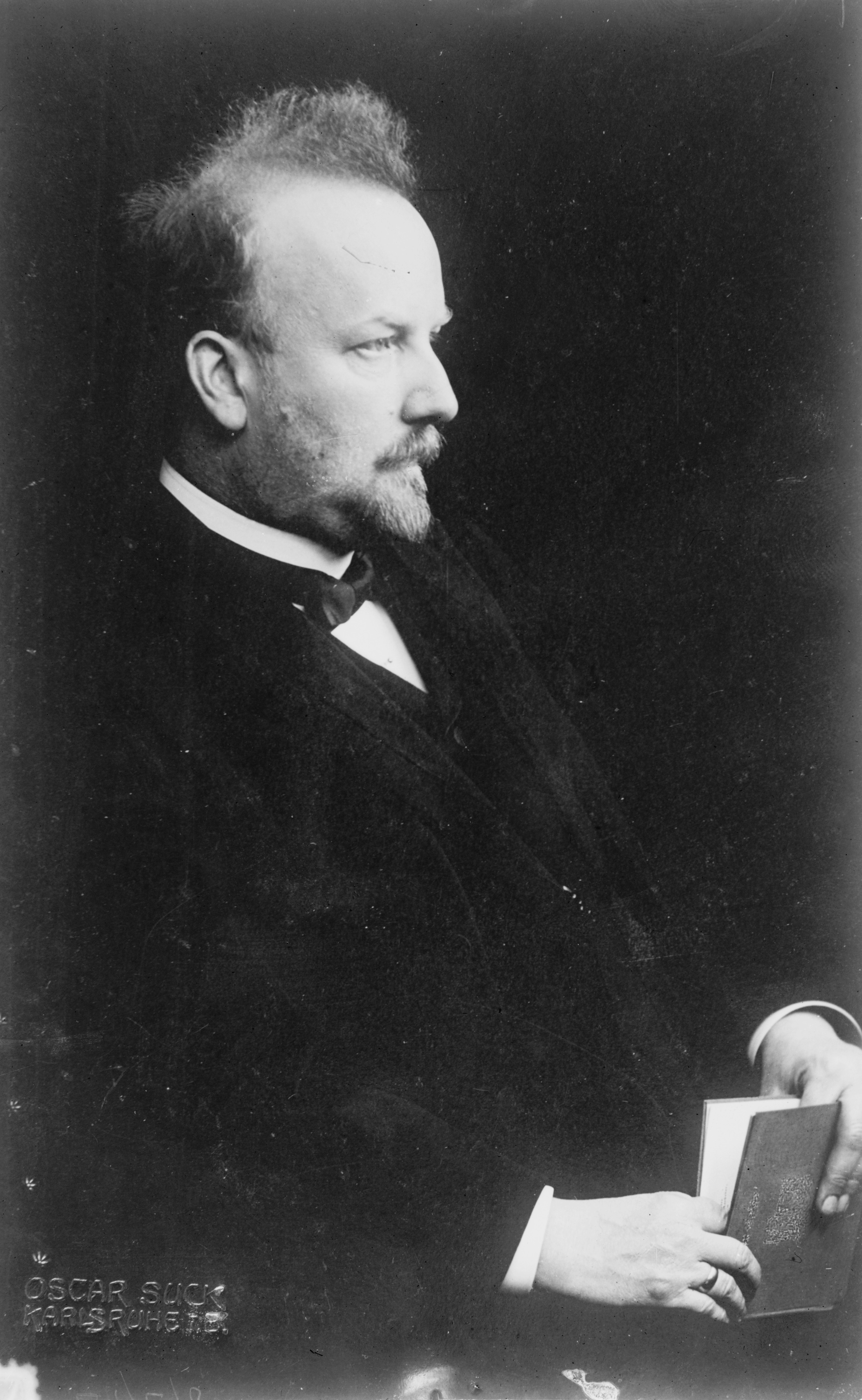
- Portrait photograph of Arthur Drews
- Born: 1 November 1865; Uetersen, Duchy of Holstein
- Died: 19 July 1935 (aged 69); Achern, Nazi Germany

Education
- Education: University of Halle (PhD, 1989)

Philosophical work
- Era: Late modern philosophy
- Region: Western philosophy
- School: German idealism, monism
- Institutions: Technische Hochschule in Karlsruhe
- Main interests: Philosophy of religion
- Notable ideas: "Christ Myth" theory

Christian Heinrich Arthur Drews (German: [dʁɛfs]; 1 November 1865 – 15 July 1935) was a German writer, historian, philosopher, and important representative of German monist thought. He was born in Uetersen, Holstein, in present-day Germany.

== Biography ==
Drews became a professor of philosophy and German language at the Technische Hochschule in Karlsruhe. During his career he wrote widely on the histories of philosophy, religions and mythology. He was a disciple of Eduard von Hartmann who claimed that reality is the "unconscious World Spirit", also expressed in history through religions and the formation of consciousness in the minds of philosophers. Drews often provoked controversy, in part because of his unorthodox ideas on religion and in part because of his attacks on Nietzsche and passionate support of Wagner. He rose to international prominence with his book The Christ Myth (1909), by amplifying and publicizing the thesis initially advanced by Bruno Bauer, which denies the historicity of Jesus.

The international controversy provoked by the "Christ Myth" was an early part of Drews's lifelong advocacy of the abandonment of Judaism and Christianity, both of which he regarded as based on ancient beliefs from antiquity, and shaped by religious dualism. He urged a renewal of faith [Glaubenserneuerung] based on Monism and German idealism. He asserted that true religion could not be reduced to a cult of personality, even if based on the worship of the "unique and great personality" of a historical Jesus, as claimed by Protestant liberal theologians, which he argued was nothing more than the adaptation of the Great Man Theory of history promoted by Romanticism of the 19th century.

Drews was considered a dissenter. Many German academics didn't accept his "dilettantism" (abweichungen von der communis opinio, that is, "straying from common opinions"). Drews was a reformer, and stayed involved in religious activism all his life. He was, in his last few years, to witness and participate in an attempt by the Free Religion Movement to inspire a more liberal form of worship. This was his reason for parting with the German Faith Movement, a venture trying to promote (without success) an awakening of a German Faith, an unusual form of nationalistic and racist faith with Hindu overtones — far removed from the elitist German idealism Drews expounded in his last book, The German Religion (Deutsche Religion, 1935) which he had hoped to see replace Christianity and what he considered its primitive superstitions. Later, Drews came back to the same subject in The Denial of the Historicity of Jesus in Past and Present (1926), which is a historical review of some 35 major deniers of Jesus historicity, covering the period 1780–1926.

== Influences ==
During Drews's life, Germany was going through turbulent times, both politically and culturally. Friedrich Nietzsche had become a prominent cultural icon while Richard Wagner was a highly controversial personality. Nietzsche was a strong critic of Christianity and its morality, which he perceived as glorifying weakness and death. At first he was a friend and admirer of Wagner, but soon became a disgruntled critic, turning against his previous friend. He reproached Wagner for his conversion to antisemitic Christianity and his glorification of medieval sagas and spiritual chastity as the sign of a decadent, dying culture. He posited that Wagner's "unending melody" only dramatizes theatrical posing and is hostile to the affirmation of vital Dionysian life forces. Nietzsche claimed that Wagner's art was not Germanic, but closer to Italy's Roman Catholicism. Nietzsche passionately critiqued Wagner's ideas, detailed in Nietzsche contra Wagner.

Drews was a staunch supporter of Wagner and wrote many books and articles on Wagner's religious and nationalistic ideas, which are still considered by some scholars to be important works on the subject. He also embarked on a critique of Nietzsche, who was a lifelong critic of Christianity and Christian morality. Drews reproached Nietzsche for being an apostle of unbridled individualism—a stance which put Drews in an awkward position in the German establishment. His criticisms were never well received by academics nor by German society as a whole, since Nietzsche had become a national figure.

In 1904, Drews gave a critical lecture in Münich on the philosophy of Nietzsche, Nietzsches Philosophie. "[Nietzsche] is not aiming at bypassing morality as such, only the external morality which imposes its commandments to the individual, and results in the decay and submission of the Self. He would like to counter this old morality enemy of the Self with a new morality springing from the individual will and in conformity with his nature." [emphasis added] Drews continued with his philosophical critique of Nietzsche in Nietzsche als Antipode Wagners, 1919 [Nietzsche, Antipodes of Wagner]. His 1931 book on Wagner came out with a supplement on Nietzsche and Wagner, for which Bernhard Hoffers asserted that many of Drews's views later borrowed by the standard scholarship on Wagner without giving him credit.

Drews delivered his last public critique of Nietzsche in his article Nietzsche als Philosoph des Nationalsozialismus? ["Nietzsche, a philosopher of National Socialism?"] in the journal Nordische Stimmen No. 4 (1934: 172–79). There Drews again attacked Nietzsche on philosophical grounds, in direct opposition to the Nazi effort to enlist Nietzsche in its propaganda, and unconcerned about potential consequences. Wolfang Müller-Lauter, in Experiences with Nietzsche, quotes Drews:

One finds in Nietzsche neither national sympathy nor social awareness, [Drews claimed]. Nietzsche is, on the contrary, and particularly after his break with Richard Wagner, an enemy of everything German; he supports the creation of a "good European," and goes so far as to accord the Jews a leading role in the dissolution of all nations. Finally, he is an individualist, with no notion of "the National Socialist credo: 'collective over individual utility'. ... After all this, it must seem unbelievable that Nietzsche has been honored as the Philosopher of National Socialism ... for he preaches in all things the opposite of National Socialism", setting aside a few scattered utterances. The fact that such honors have repeatedly been bestowed on him has as its main reason, that most people who talk about Nietzsche tend only to pick the 'raisins' from the cake of his philosophy and, because of his aphoristic style, lack any clear understanding of the way his entire thought coheres. [emphasis added]

== Drews's views on religion ==
Arthur Drews, Karlsruhe

=== Eduard von Hartmann ===
Drews, unsatisfied by the abstract rationality of Kantian philosophy, was attracted to religion, but was put off by what he regarded as the spiritual dryness (geistige Dürre) of Christianity. Drews found his anchor in the monism of Eduard von Hartmann (1842–1906), professor of philosophy in Berlin. Hartmann had been strongly influenced by Schopenhauer and his pessimism and had embraced Darwinism and history. Hartmann published his work Philosophy of the Unconscious, in 1869. The concept of the unconscious mind (das Unbewusstsein) became the new form of the ultimate reality, the Absolute, or the Geist, or World Spirit of Hegel, combining pantheism with rational idealism (with the double attributes of will and reason). In his view the human mind is not separate from this unconscious reality, but exists as it approaches self-consciousness (Selbstbewusstsein), especially in the opinion of the philosophical community.

Drews expanded his views in Die Religion als Selbst-bewusstsein Gottes: eine philosophische Untersuchung über das Wesen der Religion, (Religion as Self-Consciousness of God: A philosophical inquiry in the Essence of Religion, 1906). The text expressed that religions are conscious expressions of the unconscious, and philosophy and religion can finally be united. The absolute Spirit was not another separate entity, and Hartmann and Drews rejected the idea of any personal God and mind-matter dualism.

In Christ Myth II, Drews specified his motivation: "The chief danger that has come to our time, especially to religion, under the influence of science is the denial of objective purpose in the universe. Let men be taught to believe again in ideas, and then monism, in its idealistic form, will become the first principle of all deep religious life." [emphasis added] Drews goes on to proclaim a need for the "religion of the future" to be a "concrete" monism. The advocacy of this system of monism became Drews's life program and the subject of his philosophical and religious writings. It was also the motivation for his social activism in the Free Religion Movement, which had been sprouting cultural associations (Kulturbünde) in Germany, especially in the search for a new religion anchored in European and, more specifically, German culture. Both Hartmann and Drews shared an infatuation with history, and the belief in the direction of history, transmuted into a philosophical axiom by Hegel, was applied to the history of religion and mythology.

=== Influence of Albert Kalthoff and Bauer ===
Drews derived additional key ideas from Albert Kalthoff (1850–1906). Kalthoff was an active minister who managed to marry three times in his short life, and revived Bruno Bauer's Christ Myth thesis in his Das Christus-Problem. Grundlinien zu einer Sozialtheologie (The Problem of Christ: Principles of a Social Theology, 1902) and Die Entstehung des Christentums, Neue Beiträge zum Christusproblem (The Rise of Christianity, 1907). Kalthoff criticized what he regarded as the romanticist and sentimental image of Jesus as a "great personality" of history developed by German liberal theologians (including Albert Schweitzer). In Kalthoff's views, it was the early church that created the New Testament, not the reverse; the early Jesus movement was socialist, expecting a social reform and a better world, which fused with the Jewish apocalyptic belief in a Messiah. Kalthoff saw Christianity as a social psychosis. Drews accepted Kalthoff's ideas, but insisted that the original Christian socialism was religious, not economic.

=== Critique of liberal theology ===
Drews did become an acerbic critic of what he called the "faulty historical method" of academic liberal theologians. His primary critique of Judaism and Christianity was that they were ancient, archaic myths from antiquity that had become obsolete, and "their concepts [are] foreign to our mindsets in the modern scientific age". He opposed the Romanticist cult of personality applied to Jesus in what he referred to as the Christ myth. He rejected the attempt of liberal theologians like Albert Schweitzer to idolize a historical Jesus as a unique personality, which he asserted was the result of The Great Man Theory subjected to modern manipulations by scholars of the Historical Theology school. This view had been already advanced by Schweitzer himself in his review of historical criticism in Germany with his book The Quest of the Historical Jesus (1906).

In Die Religion als Selbst-bewusstsein Gottes : eine philosophische Untersuchung über das Wesen der Religion (Religion as Self-Consciousness of God: a Philosophical Inquiry in the Essence of Religion, 1906), Drews saw the phenomenon of religion through his philosophical approach as the self-consciousness of God through the mind of mankind. "Godmen" were to be replaced by "God-mankind", an adaptation of Georg Friedrich Hegel's "World-Spirit".

In The Strong Personality, Ch. 12 of "The Witness of the Gospels", Part IV of Christ Myth II, Drews argues that the force of personality of ahuman Jesus cannot be at the source of Christendom's spread:

[First, quoting Dupuis] Each man fights for his own chimera, not for history...in matters of religion the belief of many generations proves nothing but their own credulity... A great error is propagated more easily than a great truth, because it is easier to believe than to reflect, and men prefer the wonders of romance to the plain facts of history... we might urge against Christians that the faith of any people in the miracles and oracles of its religion proved its truth; I doubt if they would admit the argument, and we will do the same with theirs. I know that they will say that they alone have the truth; but the other people say the same.
[The Christ cult replaced the Mithras cult for reasons other than the force of personality]...the Persian Mithra was a very shadowy form beside Jesus, who came nearer to the heart, especially of women, invalids, and the weak, in his human features and on account of the touching description of his death. But that shows at the most that the more concrete idea has the better prospect of triumphing in a spiritual struggle than the more abstract; it proves nothing as regards the historical reality of the idea. Moreover, history teaches us that it was quite different causes—partly external and accidental causes of a political nature, such as the death in the Persian war of the Emperor Julian, one of the most zealous followers of Mithra—that gave Christianity the victory over Mithraism. [emphasis added]

He had been outspoken in presenting his views on religion with extreme clarity in Idea and Personality: Settlement of the Religious Crisis, Ch. 14 of The Witness of the Gospels, and Part IV of Christ Myth II. Drews asserted that mankind cannot let the present be still shackled by what he called "past superstitions of ancient times". He outlined what he called the religion of the future, which he said must acknowledge the World-Spirit (geist) proclaimed by Hegel as God-mankind, which is God manifesting himself through history with human actors and oracles who are merely major agents. The cult of "great personalities" he dismissed as an illusion; individuals could no longer be seen as godmen, just as revealers and oracles of the divinity.

The purely historical conception of Jesus cannot satisfy the religious consciousness of our age. [It is] obsolete. [Humanity] has not merely broken with the geocentric and anthropocentric view of the origin of Christianity, but has seen through the superstitious nature of ecclesiastical Christology. Modern humanity has, therefore, the task of again universalising the idea of divine redemption, or enlarging the idea of a god-man...to the idea of a god-humanity...

[It] returns in a certain sense to pre-Christian religion and its numerous "god-men,"... filled with the idea of the one reality and its spiritual nature, to which the various individuals are related only as modi, phenomena, or'revelations, confiding in the divine control of the world, and therefore in its rationality and goodness...Thus man secures a faith in himself, in the divine nature of his being, in the rationality of existence; thus he is placed in a position to save himself, without a mediator, simply on account of his own divine nature... The religion of the future will either be a belief in the divine nature of the self, or will be nothing... no Christ is needed for it, and there is no ground for concern that religion may perish with the denial of the historicity of Jesus...
[The belief in Christ"] is not only superfluous, but mischievous. It loads the religious consciousness with doubtful historical ballast; it grants the past an authority over the religious life of the present, and it prevents men from deducing the real consequences of their Monistic religious principles. Hence I insist that the belief in the historical reality of Jesus is the chief obstacle to religious progress...

[No need to appeal to Hegel] to whom this high appreciation of the present above history may be traced, as well as this vindication of "personalities of world-history." The great personality has clearly a value even in our own view: in it the unity of God and man, the God-mankind, attains a clearer expression. It serves as proof to the religious consciousness that God raises up the right man at the right time. It reveals the living connection of the common individual life with the universal spiritual life. The divinity lives in history, and reveals itself therein. History is, in union with nature, the sole place of divine activity... one continuous stream of divine activity flows through time... To bind up religion with history, as modern theologians do, and to represent an historical religion as the need of modern man, is no proof of insight, but of a determination... to recognise the Christian religion alone.

=== Studies of monism ===
Drews believed that religion was intimately linked to the prevalent beliefs of the social group and not just the expression of individual beliefs and faith. He reflected on the history of the great faiths of the world, the European history of the 19th century, and nationalism. His own mysticism, as a modern form of monism, glamorized the German idealism of the great German thinkers and poets as the superior form of future religion for mankind. It also was related to Spinoza's pantheism, which also rejected Judaism and Christianity as ancient superstition no longer valid for the rationalism of our modern times.

Drews was especially drawn to Plotinus, who founded Neoplatonism 600 years after the time of Plato. A year later, Drews edited Der Monismus: dargestellt in Beiträgen seiner Vertreter, where he analyzes the major philosophers of monism. In 1913, he published History of Monism in Antiquity (1912) throughout the various schools of hellenistic philosophy.

Drews thus managed to produce a modern system of philosophy joining the ancient idealism and monism of Plotinus's Neoplatonism and the modern historical idealism of Hegel, for whom the World-Spirit manifests itself in History. Towards the end of his life, Drews started writing more explicitly on what the idea of a monist God means in the context of modern Germany in the 1930s. God (1930) and The Word of God (1933) demonstrated his trend towards a German-inspired form of religion.

=== Astromythical views related to early Christianity ===
Drews was intrigued by the alleged influence of ancient astronomy on the origins of religion, developed by the French Volney and Dupuis and promoted throughout the 19th century. He included modern considerations on astromythical topics in some pages of his major books. The Appendix to his 1912 book The Witnesses to the Historicity of Jesus was an essay on the astral speculations of the Ancients in relation to Psalm 22. Hoffers notes that, in the 1921 book on The Gospel of Mark as a Witness against the Historicity of Jesus, Drews demonstrates "how Mark reflects an astromythical triple journey along the zodiac". In 1923 Drews published a general introduction into astral mythology, Der sternhimmel in der Dichtung und Religion der Alten Völker und des Christentums, eine Einführung in die Astralmythologie (The Celestial Sky in the Poetry and Religion of the Ancients and Christianity: an Introduction to Astral Mythology), and its special influence on early Christianity. His interest remained a professional expression of curiosity and admitted speculations on relations detected by intuition and finesse, and never replaced rigorous text and historical criticism.

=== Other books on early Christianity ===
Drews also wrote a few more books on various aspects of Christianity where he systematically analyzes what he regarded as the mythical nature of the personages involved with Jesus Christ. Klaus Schilling wrote in his "English summary" to The Denial of the Historicity of Jesus in Past and Present:

Drews was involved too deep into the subject to stop there, and went boldly further, exploring how Christianity could become a world religion without a historical founder or core group described in scripture ... During the [First World] war, Schweitzer published more essays in a weak attempt to justify theology, which strengthened Drews' attitude and endeavor. [emphasis added]

In The Legend of Peter (1910, translated into English in 1997 by Frank Zindler), Drews complains that "the confusion in educated circles ... is so great and the posture of Rome so impudent", and exposes the completely legendary character of the figure of Peter, both in the Gospels and the fantastical history of Peter in Rome. According to Drews (in Klaus Schilling's "English Summary" of The Denial of the Historicity of Jesus):

The Gospel is a poetic retelling of the astral mythical journey of the sun god, dressed in Tanakh pictures ... The order of the tales follows almost strictly the astral mythical cycle. Mark's gospel is of astral magical, Gnostic origin from the middle of the second century ... Drews had published an introduction to astral mythology in the cultures of the Mediterranean and Iranian region up to imperial times, in order to decrease the above ignorance. But theologians continued to indulge in their self-induced ignorance. [emphasis added]

In his 1924 book The Origin of Christianity in Gnosticism, Drews developed the hypothesis of the derivation of Christianity from a gnosticism environment. In Drews's own words (in Klaus Schilling's "English Summary" of The Denial of the Historicity of Jesus):

Gnosticism is undeniably pre-Christian, with both Jewish and gentile roots. The wisdom of Solomon already contained Gnostic elements and prototypes for the Jesus of the Gospels ... God stops being the Lord of righteous deed and becomes the Good One ... A clear pre-Christian Gnosticism can be distilled from the epistles of Paul. Paul is recklessly misunderstood by those who try to read anything Historical Jesus-ish into it. The conversion of Paul in the Acts of the Apostles is a mere forgery from various Tanakh passages. ... [The epistles] are from Christian mystics of the middle of the second century. Paul is thus the strongest witness against the Historical Jesus hypothesis ... John's Gnostic origin is more evident than that of the synoptics. Its acceptance proves that even the Church wasn't concerned with historical facts at all. [emphasis added]

In The Myth of Mary (1928), which reads as Jesus's Family and Entourage Exposed, Drews asserted that all the characters around Jesus were as imaginary and fantastic as Jesus himself.

== Drews's activism for free religion and monism ==
=== The need for a modern reform of religion ===
One consequence of the success of the German school of historical criticism had been to instill an overt skepticism towards the Christian religion among the German population. A search for a German, non-Christian religion dated to pre-World War I times. Arthur Drews himself was a product of this emerging opposition to Christianity, expressed in his lifelong concern about the state of the Christian churches. After World War I, Germany became radicalized, the skepticism towards the two established Christian churches and the search for a new kind of worship attuned to the national culture became a latent national preoccupation, as alluded to by Leonard Foster in his 1938 article on "The New Paganism and the Old Teutonic Religion". One of Drews's concerns was about restoring the authenticity of religion in mankind. Both William Benjamin Smith and Arthur Drews denied the historicity of Jesus Christ, but, unlike most exponents of the myth thesis, they were dedicated theists who thought that by purging religion of all its legendary accretions, they were providing an important cleanup service and equipping it with the tools to efficiently withstand the onslaught of modern materialism.

Drews felt an urgent need to reform the structure of established religion, free it from its attachment to the primitive features of the early mythical Christianity. In Christ Myth II he glorifies the greatness of the German mind and complains: "How, then, can we be asked to admit that the salvation of modern times depends on a belief that has, in the Churches, degenerated into a stupid superstition? ... Why, then, should we be compelled to take our religious possessions from the past? ... Are the ideas of a remote age and a degenerate culture to keep us under their power for ever?" Drews's books were released during a phase of profound turmoil in Germany and a restructuring of its religious scene. Repeatedly, Drews came back to the same theme of reform and started thinking about the nature of religion in the future.

=== The Free Religion movement ===
Drews was one of those scholars and intellectuals who were not averse to bringing their ideas to the public, especially, in his case, if it was for the cause of countering the influence of Christian churches. He was a religious activist, willing to descend into the public forum, stand up for his views, and harangue the crowds. The concern about a renewal of religion had been Drews's preoccupation all his life, along with many other Germans. Germany was going through a craze of forming all kinds of associations for matters of public concern, including religion. Alongside the established churches, Germany had seen a few important movements emerge with a liberated attitude towards religion. In 1859 the German Association of Free Religion Societies (Bund Freireligiöser Gemeinden Deutschlands) was founded. This was followed in 1881 by the German Association of Freethinkers (Deutscher Freidenkerbund), and in 1906 the German Association of Monists (Deutscher Monistenbund).

Drews threw in his lot with both the Free Religion Association and the Monist Association, which were part of the Free Religion Movement (Freireligiöse Bewegung). In addition, Drews was a member of the new No-Confession Committee (Komitee Konfessionslos), formed in 1909, becoming president in 1912. The Komitee supported the Church Exist Movement [Kirchenaustrittsbewegung], which became very successful since its inception in 1905 for attracting lapsed members of other churches as well as scientists, academic personalities, and cultural celebrities. In 1924 Drews, who was the leader of the Free Religion Society of Karlsruhe, joined a few other Societies of the Southwest to form a new Association of Free Religion for the Southwest(Verband Freireligiöser Gemeinden Süd- und Westdeutschlands), with a more religious and less political orientation than the other movements.

=== The Völkish movement ===
In opposition to the religious movements, a non-religious cultural current had gained some impetus: the so-called Völkische Bewegung (Völkish movement), which dated back to the Romanticist movement of the 1850s, when the German revolutionary drives had been crushed by the arrival of Bismarck. Uwe Puschner is a well-known historian of this movement. This movement had a popular base and combined various elements: extreme nationalism, anti-Christianity, a reverence for the mythical Teutonic past, racism, antisemitism, and a revival of Germanic paganism. This trend is described in the books by Hubert Cancik & Uwe Puschner, Antisemitismus, Paganismus, Völkische Religion (Antisemitism, Paganism, and Völkish Religion, 2004), and by Stefan Breuer, Die Völkischen in Deutschland (The Popular Societies in Germany, 2008). Although the Völkish Movement was different in ideology from National Socialism, Uwe Puschner has stressed that the two movements had great similarities and that the Völkish significantly contributed to the eventual success of the Nazi Party.

=== The new popular myth of the superior German race ===
Drews had been a philosopher and an historian of philosophy, with a proselytizing drive for promoting his brand of idealistic monism. His interest in religion and mythology made him sensitive to the religious "essence" of social cultural beliefs. Romantic Nordic mysticism had become a prevalent fascination among the 19th-century German elite, such as Richard Wagner and contemporary artists, historians, and writers. It had unavoidably aroused Drews's attention for the old Teutonic beliefs that were much in vogue in Northern Europe.

Drews had seen in early Christianity a religion of promise of rebirth and transfiguration for a defeated and oppressed country (announcing the coming of the Kingdom of God), and the creation of a national myth giving hope to ancient occupied Palestinian Jews (an expectation of a messianic leader and liberator). Jews were expecting that Palestine was going to go through its own course of death and rebirth.

Aging and close to death, Drews was struck by the theoretical parallel of early Christianity with modern National Socialist mysticism, a promise of national rebirth and transfiguration from an oppressed state and ofrenewed hope for a defeated country under the leadership of a new charismatic liberator, which resonated with his own concept of a future religion based on German monist idealism.

==== German nationalism and repudiation of Christianity ====
With the Nazi Party's propaganda overwhelming the country, Drews's language in his last theological writings became increasingly focused on the concepts of glorified Germanness by opposition to the people of the Ancient Near East, whose cultures had given rise to Greco-Roman classicism (including Drews's beloved Plotinus), but also Christianity—now all devalued and labeled as foreign races. Drews thus seemed convinced that the unconscious World Spirit had moved from the Mediterranean to Germany, and the philosopher had to go along.

Feeling in touch with the new cultural spirit of national rebirth and exalted hope in the future then prevailing in Germany, Drews started evangelizing on the theme of German nationalism, using it as another argument against Christianity. Thus, he wrote in Das Wort Gottes (The Word of God, 1933, p. 11):

[Free Religion believers] are "German and not Romans ... [and must reject] a determination of our faith on the Bible and its knowledge. ... Christendom is the expression of sunken times and of the mindset of a race foreign to us. ... Christendom has absolutely nothing to do with Germanness [Deutschtum] ... and a German Christendom [would be] nonsense. ... [As for Protestantism] with the blows it delivers on the Gospels, it is straight on its way to Rome. ... Jesus the Aryan [is] a pure ideal. [There is] no reason [to assume] a Nordic origin of Jesus. [But the question of the origin of Jesus is secondary for Drews] ... [Contrary to] believers in the Bible for whom Palestine is the 'Holy Land', for devotees of Free Religion, Germany is the Holy Land. [The German is], as an Aryan, fundamentally Monist, (Pantheist), [contrary to dualist Christians. Free Religion is] the manifestation of the essence [Wesensausdruck] of our German people. [emphasis added]

Drews systematically used monism in his battle against Christianity. Drews concluded that free religion was "the very expression of the being of our German people". Using the accoutrements of the rampant nationalistic fervor for his own agenda, Drews was still upholding his lofty ideals, but now in the form of a German monist idealism.

==== Berdyaev's critique ====
Nikolai Berdyaev (1874–1948) was a Russian philosopher of religion and politics. Writing in 1927 as a refugee from the Bolsheviks in a Paris threatened by Germany, he contended that Drews, as a religious antisemite, argued against the historical existence of Jesus for the religious life of Aryanism.

Drews—is a philosopher of the Hartmann school. In his capacity as an Hartmannist, he preaches a religion of pure spirit. And he fights against the historicity of Jesus Christ in the name of a religion of spirit, he contends against the religious materialism which he detests. He is prepared to admit the existence of Christ, as the Logos. But for him the Logos never could have been incarnated into a man upon the earth, within earthly history. The religious materialism of Christianity is a legacy inherited from Judaism, it is a Semitic graft, and Drews in his capacity as a religious anti-Semite, struggles against this materialistic Semitic graft for the religious life of Aryanism, expressing itself in its purest guise in India. Drews, just like E. Hartmann, is a resolute antagonist against Protestantism and the religion of Jesus. For him Jesus was not real, in the metaphysical sense that Christ is real. He is the antipode to Harnack, a result of the splitting apart of the God-Man—the polar opposite to the Jesusism of the Protestants. (With the Christian Myth was connected the teaching of Drews and E. Hartmann about the unconscious Divinity, which in a fit of madness created the vale of being and comes to consciousness through man. cf. Drews, Die Religion als Selbstbewustsein Gottes.) [emphasis added]

Drews was opposed to the theology of ancient Hebraism as much as he is opposed to Christianity, and even more opposed to liberal Protestantism. This cannot be construed as a claim that Drews was a social antisemite, as he was firmly opposed to social antisemitism.

Drews shared the intense belief with the German elite of the sublimity of German consciousness (in art, literature, philosophy, and science), again re-iterated in his book Das Wort Gottes. However, he saw religion as an expression of the unconscious World-Spirit anchored in a community tightly rooted on an ancestral territory. In the late 1920s and '30s, hoping to see Germany pull away from Christianity, his writings took on an even stronger German nationalist fervor left in the wake of the Nazis.

=== The German Faith movement ===
A thorough description of this religious movement was presented by Ulrich Nanko in his 1993 book on the movement. Many adventurers were trying to ride the coattails of the Nazi success to establish new spiritual/religious movements. Among them were the founders of the new German Faith Movement (Deutsche Glaubensbewegung), founded by Jakob W. Hauer (1881–1962), and Ernst Graf zu Reventlow (1869–1943). Hauer had been a Protestant missionary in India, who had turned into a Sanskrit scholar imbued with the spirituality of Hinduism and a professor at the University of Tübingen. His friend Ernst Graf zu Reventlow had been a navy officer, a journalist, and a Reichstag deputy who had joined the NSDAP in 1927. He was an influential Nazi party member, but one who never gained the trust of Hitler and never received a position from the Nazi government. The movement adopted as its official emblem the "Sun Cross", an image of the sun forming a rounded shape with the Nazi swastika.

Hauer had started a religious movement that he wanted to expand with a larger group from the Völkish movement. Reventlow's cultural (but not racial) antisemitism led him to accept an alliance with Hauer in organizing a conference in July 1933 that would create another entity, the German Faith Movement. This new religious group became active in 1934. Hauer's ambition was to use Reventlow's NSDAP connections to engineer a unification of the Free Religion movement with the Völkish movement. As the movement developed, its objectives were revealed as follows: A state religion, anti-Christian with a Hinduism coloration, veneration of the sun, and pursuing a "species-true faith" for Germany, (a goal that resonated with Drews's hopes to see the emergence of a German religion). Also included were Blood and Soil (Blut und Boden), racist values (blood descent), nationalism (ancestral land occupation), Völkish populism (fusion with the racist/antisemitic Völkish movement), and German neopaganism.

The Southwest Association for Free Religion, including Drews's Karlsruhe Society, had formed and Drews was invited to sit on the Working Committee of this new movement. The collaboration was short-lived, however. The new group's political objectives (dreams of becoming a state religion) clashed with the basic program of the Free Religion Societies, which were pursuing more limited interests of freer religion. In addition, racism and antisemitism, which had become more overt in the NSDAP's national policy after it had reached political power, became also quickly apparent as a major goal of Hauer and Reventlow. As a result, the Southwest Association of Free Religion, in which Drews's Karlsruhe Free Religion Society was a member, soon withdrew from the German Faith Movement.

The two leaders of the new group proved that they didn't have enough political pull. Hauer could not implement the planned fusion with the Völkish movement. Reventlow's connections did not bring any benefits from the Nazi government. Contrary to their hopes, the German Faith movement never became endorsed as a Nazi party organization, never obtained the privileges Hauer was seeking, and never achieved its latent goal of becoming legitimized as the state religion by the NSDAP, in a vain hope to duplicate the endorsement of the Catholic Church by the Roman Emperor Theodosius I in 380 AD. Disillusioned, Hauer left in 1936, and joined the Party in 1937; Reventlow also left the movement early to resume the practice of Christianity and was still unable to gain Hitler's favor.

The anthropologist Karla Poewe has devoted her book New Religions and the Nazis (2005) to Hauer's attempt at founding a national religion. Richard Steigmann-Gall, author of The Holy Reich: Nazi Conceptions of Christianity, 1919-1945 (2004), is another expert on this period. He contends that Poewe, sharing "Hauer's sense of grandiosity", portrays Hauer as more significant than he was, making of "Hauer a 'truer' exemplar of Nazism than its own institutional incarnation". Whereas Hauer was at most a fellow traveler of the Nazis, a hanger-on with big ambition, "intent to appear relevant but ultimately rejected..." The movement never achieved more than the status of a small esoteric fringe group. It never managed to dent, let alone replace, Christianity in the land of Martin Luther. It turned out to be merely a cultural flash-in-the-pan, a curiosity in the complex landscape of Germany's religious life in the mid '30s. The NSDAP government changed its name in 1938 and jettisoned it as a nuisance that was incapable of displacing the two strong Christian churches in Germany, and only risked to alienate them against the new regime.

So, in spite of Drews's hope to promote a new religion based on idealistic monism and pantheism of a distinct German character, the participation of the Karlsruhe Free Religion Society in Hauer's effort to unify the provincial Free Religion associations with the Völkish movement was short-lived and produced no results. Drews, an elitist thinker in the Hegel and Hartmann tradition, had been an advocate of the unconscious World Spirit as being the fundamental engine of religion acting in history through agents and oracles. He remained hostile to any religion based on a historic personality cult and, late in life, was confronted with the practical difficulty of translating his lofty ambitions to the simpler drives and requirements of a mass movement.

=== Against antisemitism ===
Among the many reservations about the German Faith Movement, one reason for abandoning it was what Drews and others perceived as blatant antisemitism. Drews objected to the racist assumption in antisemitism in an article, Jesus the Aryan (Jesus der Arier, 1934) where he paid homage to the courage and moral fiber of the Jews through history and to the ancient Hebrew prophets who transformed the primitive god of wrath into a god of mercy in the Psalms, Proverbs, and Wisdom books:

[Drews denies that] a Jew cannot be driven by liberty and courage. ... [Drews mentioned the] fights for freedom of the Maccabees, the fatal defense of Jerusalem against the Romans and the last desperate fight of the Jews in the Bar Kokhba wars [the third and last Jewish war against the Roman army, that led to the final destruction of the Jewish state in Palestine]. [In the same vein, Drews referred to the courage of those] poor Jews of the medieval Ghetto who preferred to endure a thousand dead rather than renounce their faith, and climbed, still self-controlled, to the stakes ... [the Jewish prophets] impassioned by freedom and courage ... [who] never feared jail, exile, or death. ... [In the course of the progress of the Jewish religion] the desert god Yahweh of the Old Testament has become larger, more tolerant, more humane, more friendly ... [so that] from an angry and authoritarian god he changed into a merciful god, who is all goodness and love, the god from the Psalms, the Proverbs and the Wisdom writings. [emphasis added]

Contrary to other Free Religion devotees who parroted the slogans of the NSDAP propaganda, Drews engaged in a real discussion with Jewish intellectuals and scholars. He was able to deliver a tribute to the Jewish faith, which, on one hand, brought to light its differences with Free Religion, but also showed respect to people who had other thoughts.

=== Late theological writings and racism ===
Late in his life, with the rise of the Nazi Party and Nazi propaganda, Arthur Drews appears to have taken up more nationalistic and racist theological positions, which once again centered "true" theological experience in German pride. Drews would write in one of his final writings:

"Christianity is the expression of sunken times and of the mindset of a race foreign to us [...] Christianity has nothing to do with Germanness."

According to Bernhard Hoffers, his affinities for the German Faith movement bordered on those of J. Goebbels's own views. Drews likewise served as the primary advisor for Eugen Diederichs Verlag, which was a focal point for the rise of extreme conservatism, nationalism, and antisemitism. As such, while Drews may have been against antisemitism earlier in his life and even later, he still voiced a German superiority and had a spiritual opposition to the religion of a "foreign race" by his later life.

=== Death ===
Drews died on 19 July 1935 in Illenau, Achern (near Bühl), Baden, at the age of 70.

== Re-evaluation of Drews by Bernhard Hoffers ==
Germany has been struggling with the legacy of the Nazi era and is still in the process of rehabilitating its exceptional scholars. Bernhardt Hoffers, in his 2003 biographical eulogy, took up the challenge of restoring Drews's reputation that he felt had been unfairly tarnished. He stressed the following facts: He highlighted that Drews, during his life, had been an irritant, continually encroaching on the turf of many specialists in German universities: in theology, philology, astronomy, mythology, music criticism, and psychology. Specialists didn't welcome his interference and even resented him as an outsider. Drews had been regarded as a maverick; his philosophy stood outside of academia, which didn't accept his dilettantism (Abweichungen von der communis opinio). Hartmann was not in vogue, either, and Drews's dependence on this old professor was another hindrance. Drews created no school and had no followers in Germany. He had to remain a teacher in his Technische Hochschule in Karlsruhe for the rest of his life.

Drews's support of Wagner and opposition to Nietzsche did nothing to improve his standing. He met with the studied indifference [das Ignorieren] and the silence [das Totschweigen] of the academic pundits, while his international public popularity and press coverage were increasing. Even the University of Karlsruhe, in the very town where he lived and taught, didn't want to mention his name. His treatment at the hands of academics was similar to those of William B. Smith in the US, John M. Robertson and later George A. Wells in England, and Paul-Louis Couchoud in France.

After his death his name was largely forgotten. He was mentioned in the German media mostly for having advocated the need for a religion renewal, and in the literature about Wagner and Nietzsche. His work was omitted or grossly misrepresented and discredited in major German reference books. His books in Germany are now hard to find. However, his book on Plotinus is still in demand, the Christ Myth is widely available in the English-speaking world, and Hermann Detering of Radikalkritik continues to make the Denial of the Historicity of Jesus still available..

Drews had been fighting all his life for acceptance and recognition in Germany and for tenure at a university. In spite of his enormous scholarly output, and his popularity, he never was able to obtain a university position. One has to understand why, at the end of his life, Drews was expressing a hope for a renewal of Germany. Hoffers, for the sake of fairness, remarked that Drews never was a member of the Nazi party, and spoke out early against growing antisemitism in the 1920s . He never was involved in any action against Jewish intellectuals, artists, and academics. Whereas, for instance, a philosopher like Heidegger was more visibly active in the Nazi movement, as Rüdiger Safranski has described in detail in Martin Heidegger: Between Good and Evil (1994).

Hoffers emphasized that "As a scholar, Drews had always been objective and honest." In spite of scholarly differences, he maintained a friendship with Schweitzer for a while. He was a polyglot and collected Japanese art prints. He was a gifted, energetic man, with a tremendous capacity for work. He gained the esteem of van den Bergh van Eysinga, the leader of the Dutch Radical school, who viewed him as a" good guy" (ein netter Kerl).

In conclusion, Hoffers urged scholars to renew an acquaintance with Drews's books. Claiming that the arguments developed in his work were outmoded or refuted [überholt] is unjustified. As a parting shot, Hoffers asks a pertinent question: "Is it really true that the question of Jesus's historicity has been absolutely clarified and is moreover uninteresting, as can be heard in discussions with theologians? (Ist es wirklich so, dass die Frage nach der Historizität Jesu absolut geklärt und obendrein noch so nebensächlich ist, wie man in Gesprächen mit Theologen zu hören bekommt?)." Hoffers concludes that Drews's life was a fascinating chapter of the zeitgeschichte (history of our times).

== Works ==
- Die Lehre von Raum und Zeit in der nachkantischen Philosophie. Ein Beitrag zur Geschichte der Bekenntnistheorie und Apologetik der Metaphysik, Dec. 1889, 73 pp. Ph.D. thesis, University of Halle
- Die deutsche Spekulation seit Kant, 2 vols., 1893
- Der Ideengehalt von Richard Wagners Ring des Nibelungen in seinen Beziehungen zur modernen Philosophie, 1898
- Giordano Bruno, München, 1900
- Die moderne Psychologie, 1901
- Eduard von Hartmanns philosophisches System im Grundriss, 1902/1906
- Der transscendentale Idealismus der Gegenwart, 1904
- Nietzsches Philosophie, Heidelberg 1904
- Hegels Religionsphilosophie : in gekürzter Form, Jena, 1905
- Die Religion als Selbst-bewusstsein Gottes : eine philosophische Untersuchung über das Wesen der Religion, Jena 1906, 2d ed. 1925
- Plotin und der Untergang der Antiken Weltanschauung, Jena, 1907
- Der Monismus : dargestellt in Beiträgen seiner Vertreter, (edited by Drews, with opening article by him), Jena, 1908
- Die Christusmythe 1909 (Transl. C. Delisle Burns, The Christ Myth, London 1910) 4th ed. 1924
- Hat Jesus gelebt? Reden gehalten auf dem Berliner Religionsgespräch des Deutschen Monistenbundes am 31. Januar und l. Februar 1910 im Zoologischen Garten über "Die Christusmythe" von Arthur Drews, 1910, Verlag des Deutschen Monistenbundes, Berlin
- Die Petruslegende, ein Beitrag zur Mythologie des Christentums, 1910 (Transl. Frank Zindler, The Legend of St Peter, A Contribution to the Mythology of Christianity, 1997) 2d ed. 1924
- Die Christusmythe II: Die Zeugnisse für die Geschichtlichkeit Jesu, eine Antwort an die Schriftgelehrten mit besonderer Berücksichtigung der theologischen Methode, Jena, 1911 (Transl. Joseph McCabe The Witnesses to the Historicity of Jesus, 1912, London & Chicago)
- Lebt Jesus ? Reden über den 'historischen Jesus und die Religion', gehalten am 12. März 1911, von Prof. Dr. Arthur Drews – Kernprobleme der Gegenwart. Berliner Religionsgespräch herausgegeben von Alfred Dieterich, Berlin, 1911
- Die Philosophie im ersten Drittel des neunzehnten Jahrhunderts, Leipzig, 1912
- Geschichte des Monismus im Alterturm, Heidelberg, 1913
- Die Hypothese des Unbewußten, 1914
- Freie Religion. Vorschläge zur Weiterführung des Reformationsgedankens 1st ed. 1917, Freie Religion : Gedanken zur Weiterbildung und Vertiefung der Religion für die Gottsucher unserer Tage, 3d ed. 1921
- Der deutsche Gott, 1918
- Nietzsche als Antipode Wagners, 1919
- Das Markusevangelium als Zeugnis gegen die Geschichtlichkeit Jesu (The Gospel of Mark as a testimony against the historicity of Jesus), Jena, 1921, 2d. ed. 1928
- Einfuehrung in die Philosophie, 1922
- Der sternhimmel in der Dichtung und Religion der Alten Völker und des Christentums, eine Einführung in die Astralmythologie, Jena 1923
- Psychologie des Unbewussten, Berlin, 1924
- Die Entstehung des Christentums aus dem Gnostizismus, Jena, 1924 [on syncretism]
- Selbstdarstellung, 1924 [Autobiography]
- Die Leugnung der Geschichtlichkeit Jesu in Vergangenheit und Gegenwart, Karlsruhe, 1926 (English summary by Klaus Schilling, The Denial of the Historicity of Jesus in Past and Present, Radikal Kritik)
- Die Marienmythe, Jena, 1928
- Hat Jesus gelebt?, Mainz, 1928
- Gott, Mainz 1930
- Der Ideengehalt von Richard Wagners dramatischen Dichtungen in Zusammenhang mit seinem Leben und seiner Weltanschauung. Mit einem Anhang: Nietzsche und Wagner, Leipzig 1931
- Richard Wagner's "Parsifal" und das Christentum, Mainz 1933
- Das "Wort Gottes" : zur religiösen Lage der Gegenwart, Mainz, 1933
- Deutsche Religion; Grundzüge eines Gottesglaubens im Geiste des deutschen Idealismus, München, 1935 [German Religion: Principles of a Belief in God in the Spirit of German Idealism]
- Briefwechsels mit Eduard von Hartmann 1888-1906, ed. Rudolf Mutter; Eckhart Pilick, 1996
- Die Ethik Jesu, Rohrbach/Pfalz Guhl 2008
