= Darrell J. Doughty =

American biblical scholar (1936–2009)

Darrell Doughty
- Born: Darrell Jennings Doughty; June 24, 1936; Twin Falls, Idaho, U.S.
- Died: May 22, 2009 (aged 72); Portland, Maine, U.S.

Academic background
- Education: University of California, Berkeley (BS); San Francisco Theological Seminary (MDiv); University of Göttingen (PhD)

Academic work
- Discipline: Theology
- Sub-discipline: Biblical criticism New Testament

Darrell Jennings Doughty (June 24, 1936 – May 22, 2009) was an American biblical scholar who taught New Testament and Early Christianity at Drew Theological Seminary for 35 years. Doughty is associated with the revival of Dutch radicalism, along with Hermann Detering (Germany) and Robert M. Price. He was an ordained minister of the Presbyterian Church.

== Early life and education ==
Born in Twin Falls, Idaho, Doughty moved to Oakland, California at an early age, and graduated from Fremont High School in 1954. After obtaining a bachelor's degree in nuclear engineering at the University of California, Berkeley, in 1958, he studied theology at the San Francisco Theological Seminary, where he earned a Master of Divinity in 1962. In 1965, he obtained a doctorate from the University of Göttingen, where he had been a student of Hans Conzelmann.

== Career ==
Before moving to Madison, New Jersey, in 1969, Doughty taught New Testament theology at Princeton Theological Seminary and at Southwestern at Memphis (now Rhodes College). During his career at Drew Theological Seminary, he became the editor of Drew's publication Gateway Magazine, and the associate editor of the Journal of Higher Criticism. He retired to Portland, Maine, in 2004.

== Writing ==
- Heiligkeit und Freiheit: eine exegetische Untersuchung der Anwendung des paulinischen Freiheitsgedanken in 1 Kor 7 (Ph.D. diss., Göttingen, 1965)
- "The Priority of ΧΑΡΙΣ," New Testament Studies, vol. 19 (1973), pp. 163–180. (Subscription required)
- "The Presence and Future of Salvation in Corinth," Zeitschrift für die Neutestamentliche Wissenschaft und die Kunde der Älteren Kirche, vol. 66 (1975), pp. 61–90. (Subscription required)
- "Women and Liberation in the Churches of Paul and the Pauline Tradition," Drew Gateway, vol. 50 (1979), pp. 1–21
- "The Authority of the Son of Man (Mk 2.1-3.6)," Zeitschrift für die Neutestamentliche Wissenschaft und die Kunde der Älteren Kirche, vol. 74 (1983), pp. 161–181. (Subscription required)
- "Luke's Story of Paul in Corinth: Fictional History in Acts 18," Journal of Higher Criticism, vol. 1 (1994), pp. 95–128
- "Citizens of Heaven: Philippians 3.2-21," New Testament Studies, vol. 41 (1995), pp. 102–122
- "Pauline Paradigms and Pauline Authenticity," Journal of Higher Criticism, vol. 4 (1997), pp. 3–54
