= Florence Wysinger Allen =

African American art model

Flo Allen
- Florence Allen posing for a drawing class at California School of Fine Arts, May 4, 1948, by an unknown photographer
- Born: Florence Wysinger Allen; March 14, 1913; Oakland, California
- Died: June 1, 1997 (aged 84); Oakland, California
- Known for: Artists' model

Florence Wysinger Allen (March 14, 1913 – June 1, 1997) was an African American artists' model for more than 30 years. She was called "San Francisco's best loved artists' model".

== Personal life ==
Florence Wysinger Allen was born in Oakland, California in 1913. Her father, Marion, was the son of California pioneer Edmond Edward Wysinger. Her mother, née Moore, was a concert pianist. Allen attended Fremont High School and became active in the San Francisco arts community and became a civil rights activist and newspaper columnist. Her social circle included the likes of Paul Robeson, Paul Newman, Harry Belafonte and Allen Ginsberg. When not modeling she worked as a hostess at North Beach restaurants such as Washington Square Bar and Grill. In 1987 she was struck by a truck while crossing a street near Fisherman's Wharf, breaking both her legs and restricting her mobility. She died in El Sobrante, California on June 1, 1997.

== Artists' model ==
There's an art to this business. There's a hell of a lot more to it than skin and bones. It's very difficult work. You find muscles you didn't know you had. Just when you think you're relaxed, the sweat starts running – and then you itch. The strain is tremendous.

— Flo Allen

Sketch of Florence Allen by Eleanor Dickinson, 1965.

Allen began modelling in 1933, motivated by monetary need, and worked for painters such as Mark Rothko, Diego Rivera, Gertrude Murphy and Wayne Thiebaud. She also modeled for art school classes at the San Francisco Art Institute, University of California-Berkeley, Stanford University, the California College of Arts and Crafts and Mills College. Allen preferred to model in the nude acknowledging that successful modeling was strenuous, involving discipline and thought. As she stated, "You can't think with your clothes on." Modeling in the nude also earned her more money; she was paid 75 cents an hour versus 50 cents an hour for clothed modeling. In 1945 she led the founding of the San Francisco Models' Guild, an extant entity currently known as the Bay Area Models' Guild. It was influential for improving the pay for artists models. In 1965 the University of California-San Francisco held an art exhibition titled "Florence Allen Herself" which showcased Allen's thirty year modelling career. In 1987 she became the Model Coordinator and teacher of the Model Certification Workshop at the California College of the Arts.
