= Fremont High School (Oakland, California) =

Coordinates: 37°46′24.65″N 122°12′32.53″W

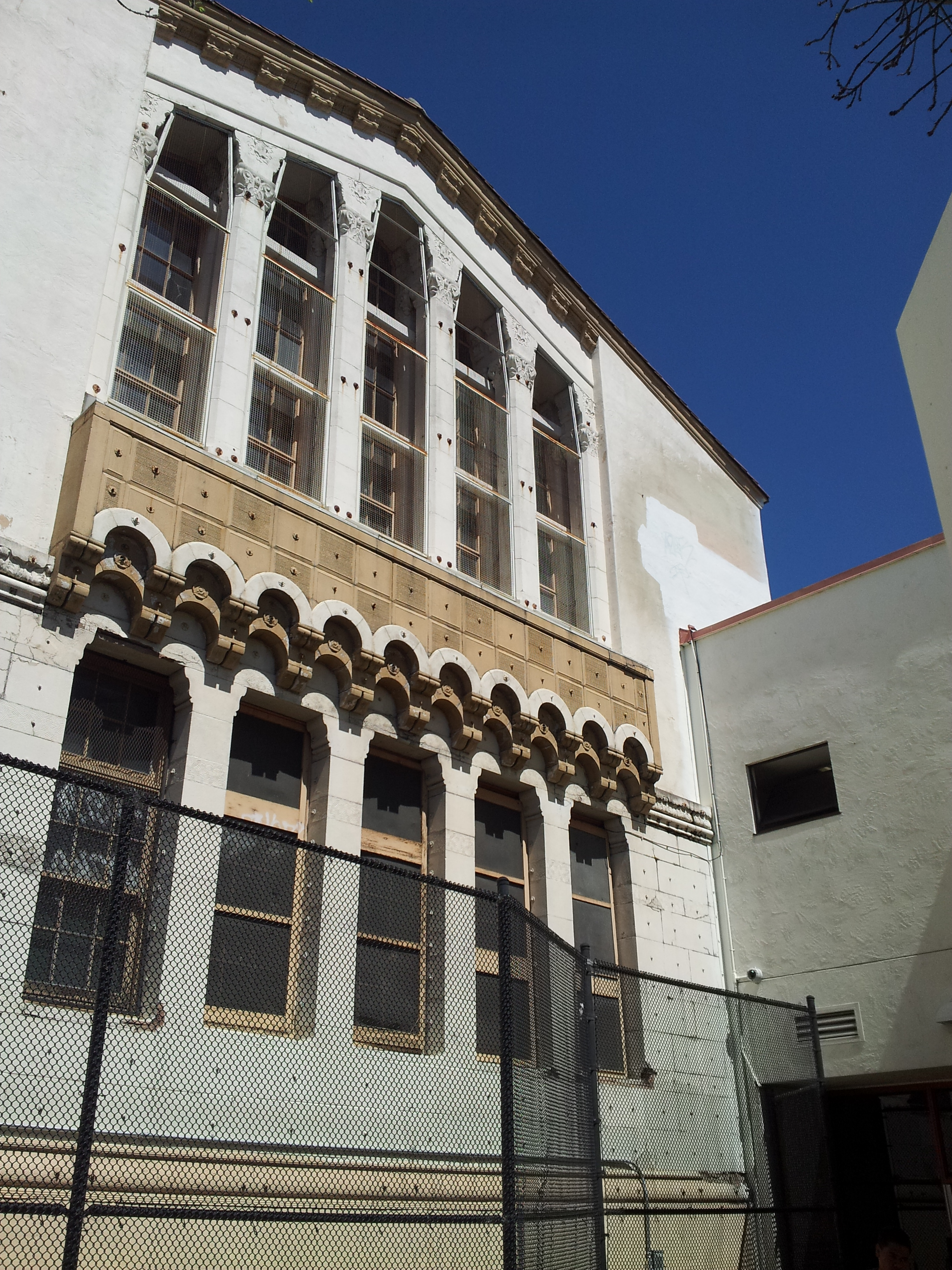
- Fremont High School Library

Location
- 4610 Foothill Blvd; Oakland, California 94601; United States

Information
- Type: Public high school
- Established: 1905
- School district: Oakland Unified School District
- Teaching staff: 71.83 (FTE)
- Grades: 9-12
- Enrollment: 1,166 (2024-2025)
- Student to teacher ratio: 16.23
- Campus: Urban
- Colors: Green and gold
- Mascot: Tiger
- Website: fremont.ousd.org

Fremont High School is an urban public high school located in East Oakland, California, United States. It was formerly a group of smaller high schools located on the same campus and known as Fremont Federation of High Schools. The school's present configuration is that of the "wall to wall" career academies model, consisting of a 9th Grade House which feeds into one of two California Partnership Academies (CPA), specifically the Architecture Academy and the Media Academy.

== History ==
Fremont High is part of the Oakland Unified School District, and located at 4610 Foothill Boulevard since 1905. A fire in 1930 destroyed much of the original campus, which was rebuilt. Most of those buildings, in turn, were renovated, with some structures demolished and rebuilt, during the mid-to-late 1970s as part of a statewide program of retrofitting schools for earthquake safety.

The school was split into four smaller autonomous schools in 2003:

- College Preparatory and Architecture Academy
- Mandela High School
- Media College Preparatory High School
- Paul Robeson School, Visual and Performing Arts (closed after the 2009–2010 school year)

The three high schools remained and had their own administration until the spring of 2011. They functioned separately, though located on the same campus, and used the same library. They also had common sports teams under the Fremont High School banner.

After the spring of 2011, as part of an Oakland Unified School District decision to slowly reverse the small school system, the three remaining schools became less autonomous. The 2011–2012 school year reintroduced a central administration with three separate entities and budgets on campus: Mandela High, Media High, and CPAA. In 2012, the Fremont Federation of High Schools again became Fremont High School, with one single administration.

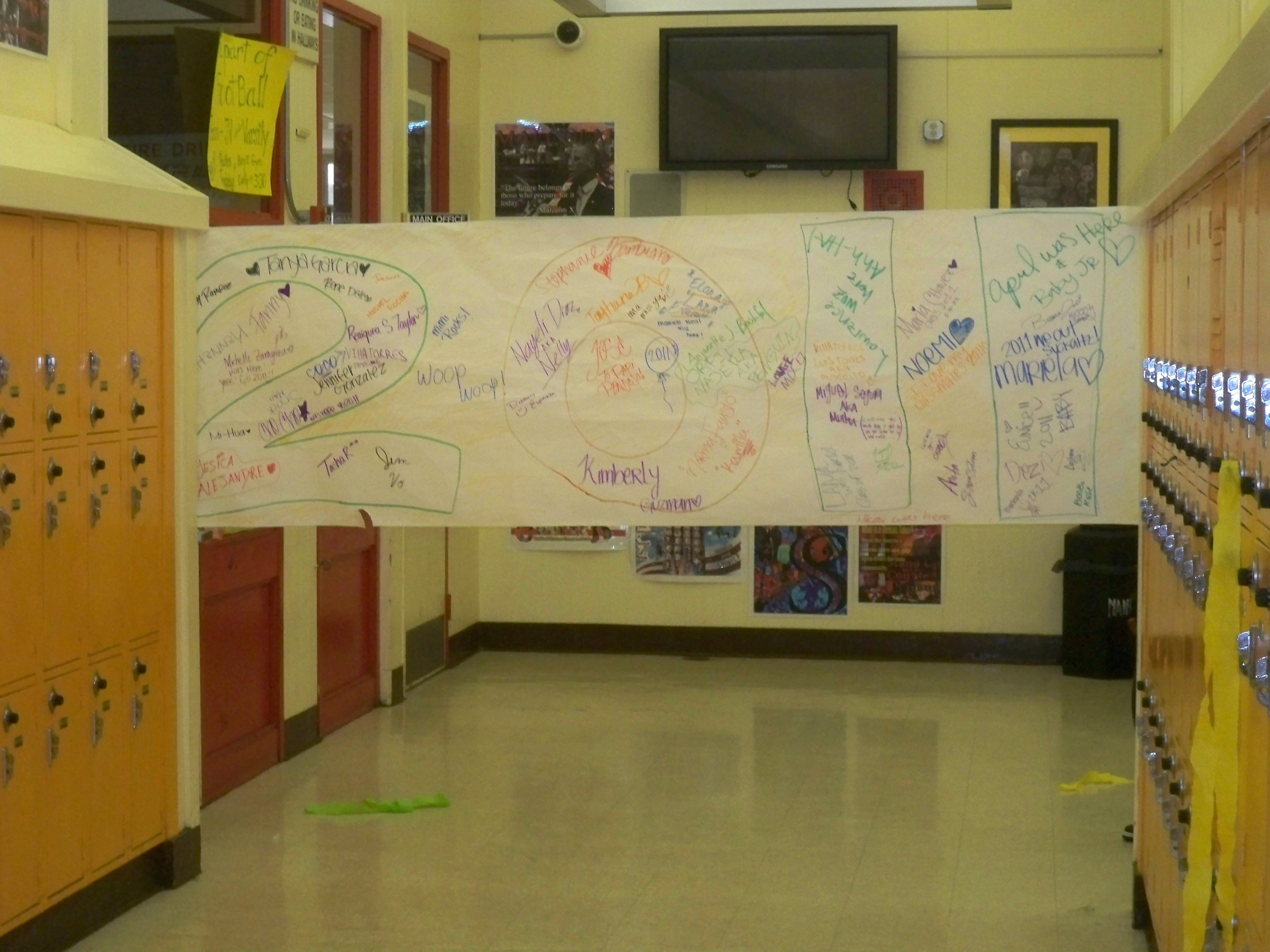
Halls at the 1100 Wing (Mandela Law and Public Service Academy)

A major project to revamp the school’s campus, started in 2018 and completed in 2020, added an academic building, a football field with grandstands, a gymnasium, and a new front entrance to the school. The $133 million project—largely funded by local bond measure, Measure J—also included renovation to an academic building and addressing sustainability through bioretention planters, additional windows and skylights for more natural lighting, and a pair of electric vehicle chargers.

In late 2023, Fremont High School received criticism from Oakland residents for flying a Palestinian flag at full-staff on campus. The flag was taken down within a day of the criticism. Before the criticism, the flag was proudly flown for close to the month and was raised by the Arab and Muslim students of Fremont High School in solidarity with the oppression and struggle of their community. Area locals on social media said that the display was offensive and endangered Jewish children.

== 2020-2021 student profile ==
- 927 students:

White, non-Hispanic	Hispanic	Asian	African American	Pacific Islander	Multiracial	American Indian or Alaska Native
2.3%	68%	4.4%	19.1%	2.7%	0.5%	0.4%

== Test scores ==
California's API scores are on a scale of 200–1000, with a statewide median around 750. In 2009, Fremont Federation's schools received the following scores:

- Mandela High School: 528
- Media College Prep. High School: 519
- Robeson Visual and Performing Arts High School: 483

In 2010, Fremont Federation of High Schools received the following scores:

- Mandela High School: 538
- Media College Prep. High School: 619
- College Preparatory and Architecture Academy: 604

CAHSEE test scores:

- Passing ELA (English Language Arts):51%
- Passing Math: 46%

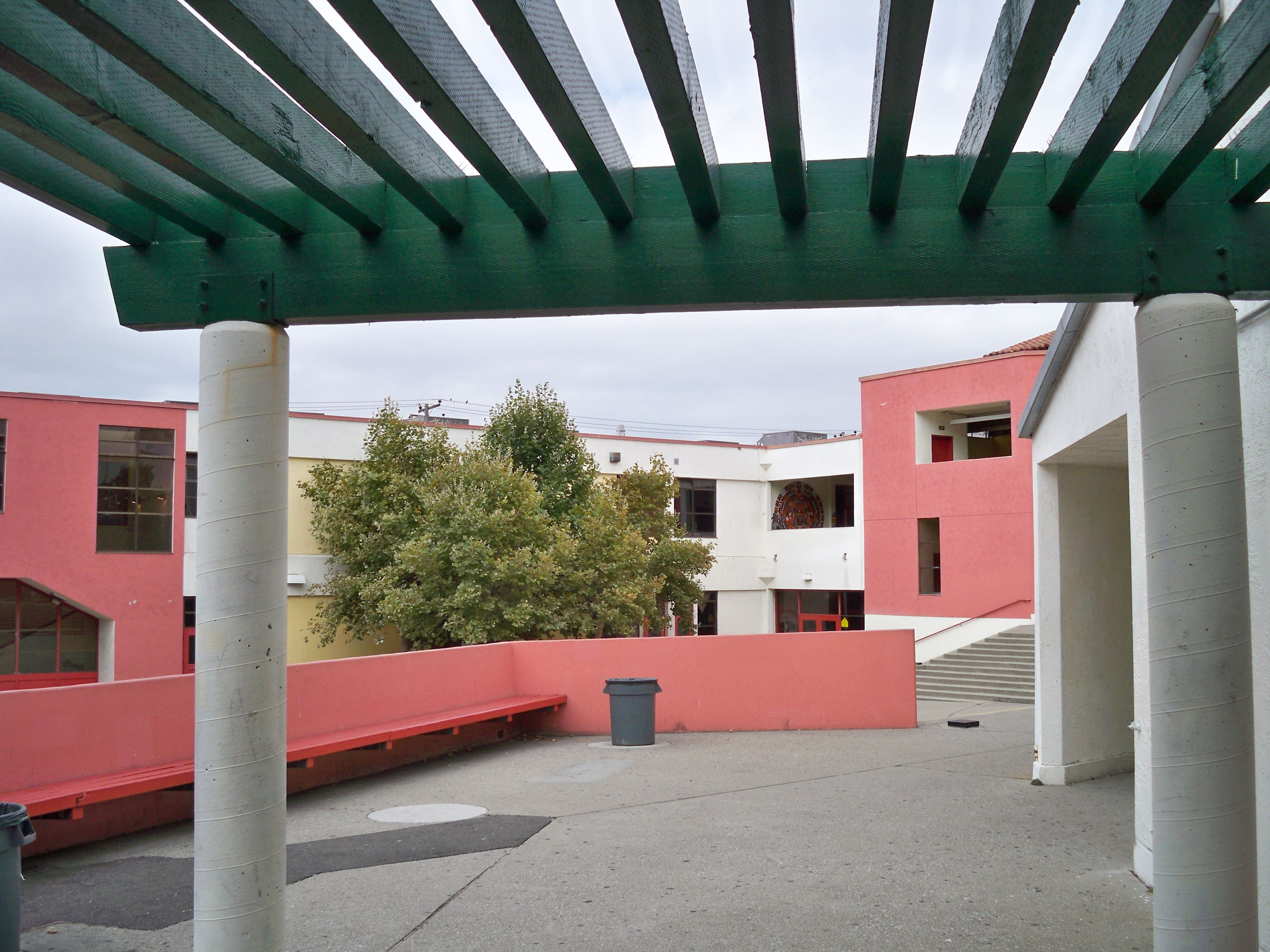
Fremont High School's courtyard

== Notable alumni ==
- Florence Wysinger Allen, artist's model
- Joanne Beretta, cabaret singer
- Bill Brenzel, former professional baseball player (Pittsburgh Pirates, Cleveland Indians)
- Lester Conner, professional basketball player and coach
- Darrell J. Doughty, biblical scholar
- Robert Harvey (literary theorist), philosopher, professor.
- Ken Hofmann, real estate developer and former co-owner of the Oakland Athletics and Seattle Seahawks
- Steve Hosey, major league baseball player
- Garry Jestadt, former professional baseball player (Montreal Expos, Chicago Cubs, San Diego Padres)
- Sten Odenwald, astronomer
- Donald G. Reed, actor and comedian
- Ade Schwammel, professional football player
- Bob Smith, former professional baseball player (Tampa Bay Rays)
- Too Short, Oakland rapper
- Henry Turner, professional basketball player
- Ken Walters, former professional baseball player (Philadelphia Phillies, Cincinnati Reds)
- Keyshia Cole, R&B singer
