= Willem Christiaan van Manen =

Dutch theologian (1842–1905)

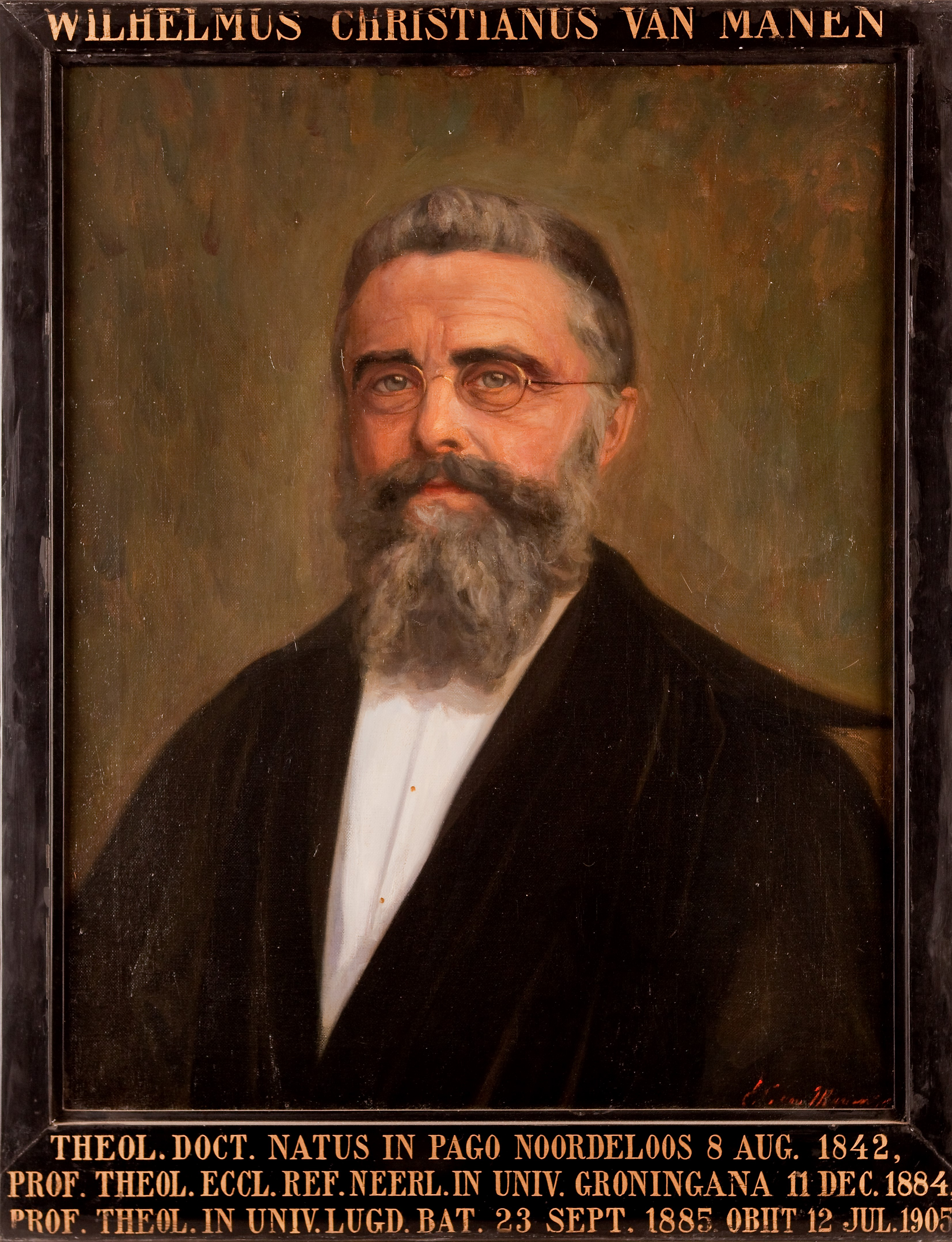
Willem Christiaan van Manen, Collection Leiden Un.

Willem Christiaan van Manen (8 August 1842 in Noordeloos – 12 July 1905 in Leiden) was a Dutch theologian. He was professor in early Christian literature and New Testament exegesis at Leiden University (1885–1903) and belonged to the Dutch school of Radical Criticism.

== Work ==
Van Manen's 1865 doctoral thesis in Utrecht about the authenticity of 1 Thessalonians concluded that this was a genuine letter by Paul of Tarsus. But in 1889 he wrote a review where he agreed with a study by Rudolf Steck and with A. D. Loman, that all Pauline epistles were pseudepigraphs. Van Manen's main work "Paulus" was published 1890–1896. The first volume treated Acts, and a theory of the development of Christianity in the 1st centuries. He argued that Acts was dependent on Flavius Josephus and other works, and assigned it to the second quarter of the 2nd century. The other two volumes were about Romans and about 1 Corinthians and 2 Corinthians.

Van Manen contributed several essays to Encyclopaedia Biblica (1899–1903):

- Old-Christian literature, especially the section "Epistles"
- Paul – Later criticism, a sequel to the treatment by E. Hatch
- Paul's epistle to the Romans
- Paul's and Polycarp's epistles to the Philippians
- Paul's epistle to Philemon
