= Albert Kalthoff =

German Protestant theologian (1850-1906)

Albert Kalthoff (5 March 1850, Barmen – 11 May 1906, Bremen) was a German Protestant theologian, who along with Emil Felden (1874–1959), Oscar Mauritz (1867–1959), Moritz Schwalb (1833–1916) and Friedrich Steudel (1866–1939) formed a group in Bremen, named the Deutscher Monistenbund (German Monists League), who no longer believed in Jesus as a historical figure.

== Biography ==
Kalthoff criticized what he regarded as the romanticist and sentimental image of Jesus as a "great personality" of history developed by German liberal theologians, including Albert Schweitzer who noted Kalthoff in his work The Quest of the Historical Jesus. In Kalthoff's views, it was the early church that created the New Testament, not the reverse; the early Jesus movement was socialist, expecting a social reform and a better world, which was combined with the Jewish apocalyptic belief in a Messiah. Kalthoff saw Christianity as a social psychosis. (Per Arthur Drews, The Denial of the Historicity of Jesus in Past and Present - see the section on Kalthoff) Arthur Drews was influenced by Kalthoff.

Bruno Bauer (1809–1882) was the first academic theologian posit the ahistoricity of Jesus. However his scholarship was buried by German academia, and he remained a pariah, until Albert Kalthoff rescued his works from neglect and obscurity. Kalthoff revived Bruno Bauer's Christ Myth thesis in his Das Christus-Problem. Grundlinien zu einer Sozialtheologie (The Problem of Christ: Principles of a Social Theology) and Die Entstehung des Christentums, Neue Beiträge zum Christusproblem (The Rise of Christianity).

== Quotes ==
The Rise of Christianity
- Author: Albert Kalthoff
- Original title: Die Entstehung des Christentums. Neue Beiträge zum Christus-problem. (How Christianity arose. New contributions to the Christ-problem.)
- Translator: Joseph McCabe
- Published: London: Watts & CO.
- Publication date: 1904
- English publication date: 1907
- Text: The Rise of Christianity at HathiTrust

- 1904: "Was There An Historical Jesus?", How Christianity arose: New contributions to the Christ-problem
  A Son of God, Lord of the World, born of a virgin, and rising again after death, and the son of a small builder with revolutionary notions, are two totally different beings. If one was the historical Jesus, the other certainly was not. The real question of the historicity of Jesus is not merely whether there ever was a Jesus among the numerous claimants of a Messiahship in Judea, but whether we are to recognise the historical character of this Jesus in the Gospels, and whether he is to be regarded as the founder of Christianity.

== Works ==
- Das Leben Jesu. Reden gehalten im protestantischen Reform-Verein zu Berlin, Berlin 1880. [The life of Jesus: Lectures given to the Protestant Reform Club of Berlin]
- Das Christus-Problem. Grundlinien zu einer Sozialtheologie, Leipzig 1902. [The Problem of Christ: Principles of a Social Theology]
- Die Entstehung des Christentums. Neue Beiträge zum Christusproblem, Leipzig 1904. transl. The Rise of Christianity 1907.
- Was wissen wir von Jesus? Eine Abrechnung mit W. Bousset, Berlin 1904. [What do We Know of Jesus? A Settlement with Wilhelm Bousset]
- Modernes Christentum, Berlin 1906. [Modern Christianity]
