= Gertrude Murphy =

American sculptor

Gertrude Murphy was a San Francisco-based sculptor who exhibited her work at the de Young and the San Francisco Museum of Modern Art in the mid-twentieth century. She is the namesake and donor for the Jack and Gertrude Murphy Fine Art Fellowship award, presented annually by the San Francisco Foundation. In 1958 and 1959 she exhibited sculptures at the San Francisco Art Association Artist Members' Exhibition at the California Palace of the Legion of Honor. In 1961, she exhibited a sculpture at the San Francisco Art Institute Arts Festival. She was married to Jack K. Murphy, president of the Jackson Square Association.
