= German Faith Movement =

Religious movement in Nazi Germany

The German Faith Movement (Deutsche Glaubensbewegung) was a religious movement in Nazi Germany that existed between 1933 and 1945, closely associated with University of Tübingen professor Jakob Wilhelm Hauer. The movement sought to move Germany away from Christianity towards a religion that was based on Germanic paganism and Nazi ideas.

== History ==
In 1933, Germany's population of almost 60 million belonged to either the Catholic Church (20 million members) or a Protestant church (40 million members). Many Christians were initially drawn to supporting Nazism due to the emphasis on "positive Christianity," noted in Article 24 of the 1920 National Socialist Program. However, two distinct Protestant factions emerged as Christians in Germany were divided along political lines. The "German Christians" (Deutsche Christen) emerged from the German Evangelical Church, adhering closely to the nationalistic and racial teachings of the Nazis and ultimately deferring to the Führer's authority. The second faction was the "Confessing Church", which opposed the "German Christians" and swore allegiance to "God and scripture, not a worldly Führer." The Confessing Church moved to counteract the Nazis' grouping of all German people into a singular Protestant church (German Christians) in order to "de-Judaize" Christianity.

Jakob Wilhelm Hauer founded the German Faith Movement in response to the Nazi government's intended indoctrination of children with Christianity and attempting to outlaw all critiques of the faith. He was initially not an obvious supporter of Adolf Hitler and had earlier started the Köngener Bund, a German Protestant youth movement, which attracted many young Germans due to its opposition to Nazism as well as to antisemitism. His allegiance changed however, joining the Combat League for German Culture (Kampfbund für deutsche Kultur) in May 1933. Hauer then joined the Hitler Youth later that year, in December. The once liberal anti-nationalist was then inducted into the SS and SD in August 1934. Hauer became the Führer of the German Faith Movement when it was constituted in May 1934. His reign was short-lived, stepping down on April 1, 1936.

Hauer was a critic of traditional Christianity but was compelled to create the German Faith Movement as a way to preserve freedom of conscience.

== Composition ==
The movement initially invited various different groups, including religious free-thinkers (at first even including Jews), racialists, and political opponents of the Nazis, to join a group that was seemingly antagonistic to the Nazi Church. However, racialists, including Hauer, did not believe Jews should be included in the movement, thus leaving only racialists and those who had abandoned German Christianity (i.e., the unconventional) to compose the German Faith Movement.

== Peak era and rituals ==
The movement's ceremonies involved sermons, German classical music and political hymns. The movement had around 200,000 followers at its height (less than 0.3% of the population). Following the Nazi accession to power, it obtained rights of civil tolerance from Rudolf Hess, but never the preferential treatment from the Nazi state for which Hauer campaigned. However, in the years that followed Hauer's abdication of his title as Führer of the Movement, the Movement largely served as a NSDAP appendage.

The development of the German Faith Movement revolved around:

- the propagation of the 'blood and soil' ideology
- the syncretism of Christian ceremonies with pagan equivalents; the most favored pagan deity being the sun, as can be seen from the flag of the faith movement
- the cult of Hitler's personality
- the spread of Norse paganism throughout Germany

Similar movements have remained active in Germany since 1945 outside mainstream educational and social structures.

== See also ==
- Neopaganism in German-speaking Europe
- Positive Christianity
- Religion in Nazi Germany

== Sources ==
- Hauer, William et al. (1937); Germany's New Religion: The German Faith Movement; London, George Allen & Unwin Ltd. Written with Karl Heim & Karl Adam; trans. from German by T.S.K. Scott-Craig & R.E. Davies.
- Nanko, Ulrich (1993); Die Deutsche Glaubensbewegung. Eine historische und soziologische Untersuchung (German: the German Faith Movement - a historical and sociological examination); Religionswissenschaftliche Reihe Bd. 4. Diagonal, Marburg (Lahn). ISBN 3-927165-16-6
- Poewe, Karla (2005); New Religions and the Nazis; Routledge. ISBN 0-415-29024-4
