= Gustaaf Adolf van den Bergh van Eysinga =

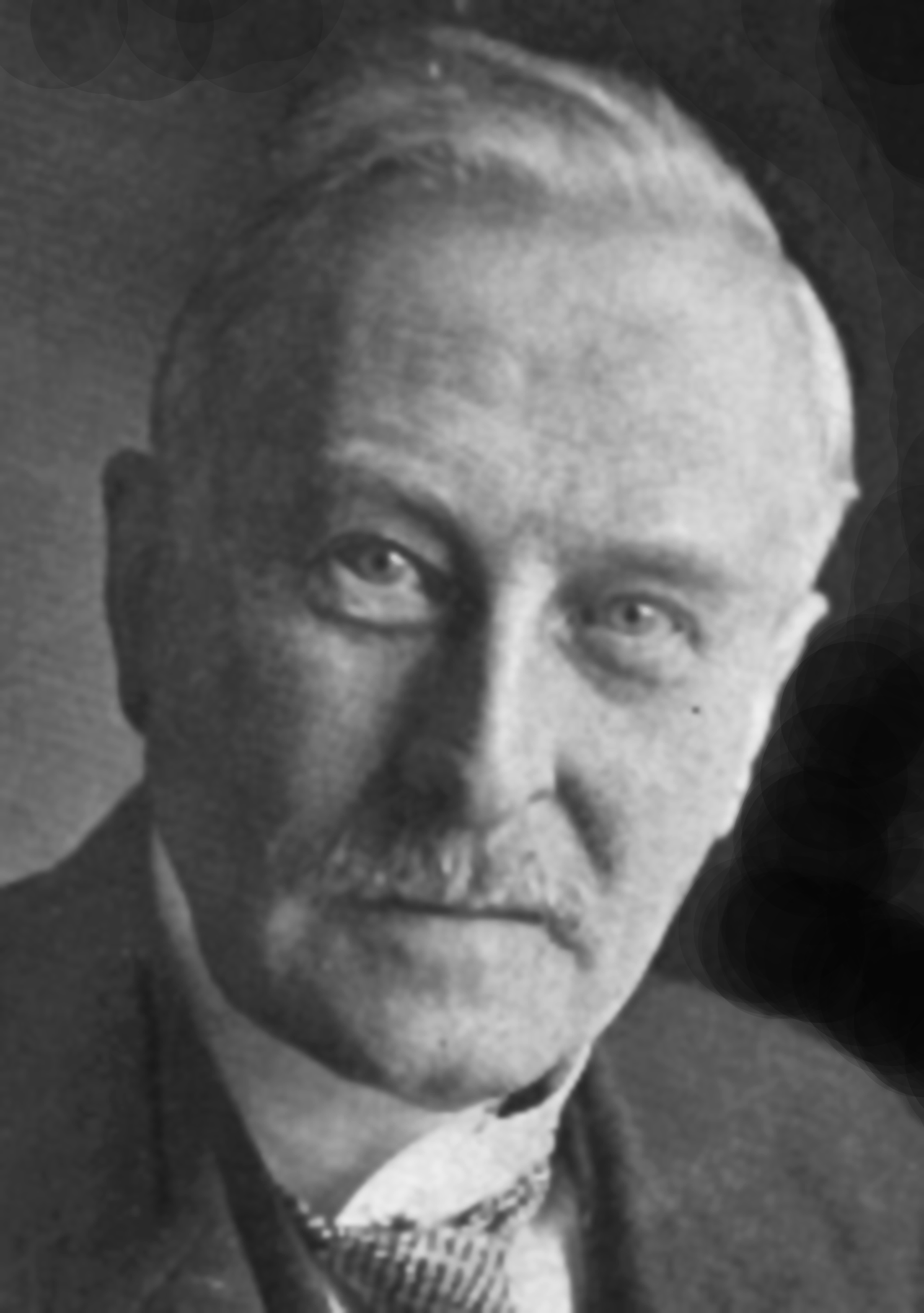
- Born: 27 June 1874; The Hague
- Died: 26 May 1957 (aged 82); Haarlem
- Occupation(s): Theologian, writer

Gustaaf Adolf van den Bergh van Eysinga (27 June 1874 in The Hague – 26 May 1957 in Haarlem) was a Dutch theologian. From 1936 to 1944 he was professor in New Testament exegesis at the University of Amsterdam. He belonged to the Dutch school of Radical Criticism. Bergh van Eysinga was an advocate of the Christ myth theory.

== Life ==
After attending school in Sneek, Van den Bergh van Eysinga started studying theology at Leiden University in 1893. He obtained a doctorate in 1901 on a thesis about Indian influences on early Christian stories, for which W.C. van Manen had been the thesis advisor. After working as a minister in the Dutch Reformed Church, he was appointed a professor in New Testament exegesis at the University of Amsterdam in 1936. After his retirement in 1944, he continued teaching at the University of Utrecht until the year of his death in 1957.

== Work ==
Bergh van Eysinga disputed the authorship of the Pauline epistles. Refuting the authenticity of the epistle of Clement and of Ignatius of Antioch, he concluded that there was no evidence for the existence of the Paulines before Marcion. He also listed internal evidence for these epistles being pseudepigraphs from Marcionite circles. In several places, the writing does not fit with a Jewish background of the author. On these matters he disagreed with Adolf von Harnack. Unlike his teacher Van Manen who accepted the historicity of Jesus, Van den Bergh found no evidence for an actual crucifixion of a person claiming to be the Messiah as the origin of Christianity.

== Selected publications ==
- Radical views about the New Testament (Open Court Publishing Company, 1912)
- The Spuriousness of the Pauline Epistles. Exemplified by the Epistle to the Galatians, originally published in Radical Views about the New Testament, translated from the Dutch by S. B. Slack (London: Watts, 1912), 59-90, published in Journal of Higher Criticism 6/1 (Spring 1999)
- Early Christianity's Letters, republished in Journal of Higher Criticism 9/2 (Fall 2002), 294-317
