= Jakob Wilhelm Hauer =

German Indologist and religious studies writer

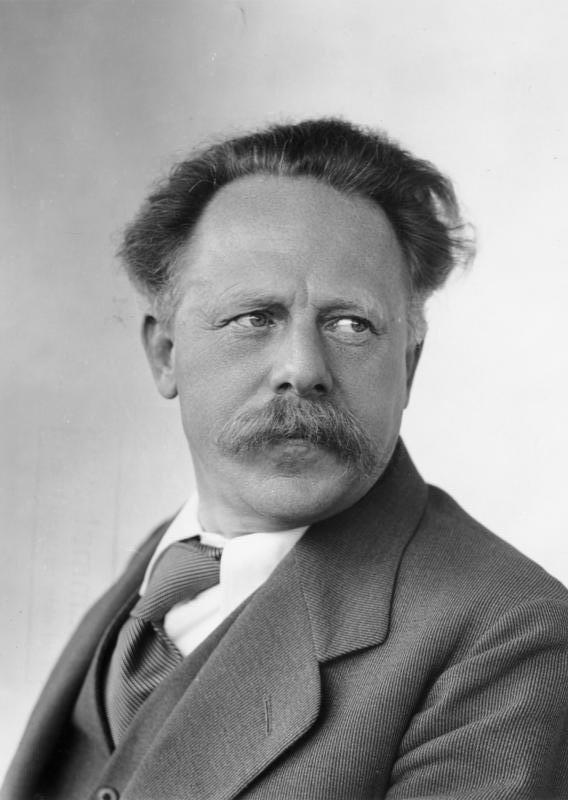
- Born: Jakob Wilhelm Hauer; 4 April 1881
- Died: 18 February 1962 (aged 80)

Jakob Wilhelm Hauer (4 April 1881 in Ditzingen, Württemberg – 18 February 1962 in Tübingen) was a German Indologist and religious studies writer. He was the founder of the German Faith Movement.

== Biography ==
Initially trained in the family trade as a plasterer, he entered the missionary school at Basel in 1900 and served as a missionary in British India from 1907 to 1911. His time in India and his study of indigenous religions saw him lose faith in Christianity and instead he returned to his studies, reading religious studies and Sanskrit at a doctorate level at the University of Oxford and the University of Tübingen, before going on to teach at the University of Marburg (1925) and Tübingen itself (1927). Under his tutelage religious studies at Tübingen became increasingly close to Nazism and by 1940 he was heading up an 'Aryan Seminar'.

In 1920 he formed the Bund der Köngener, a youth movement that grew out of groups of Protestant Bible circles who had come into contact with the Wandervogel tendency. Initially little more than a more organized version of the Wandervogel, the Bund, which was for a time led by Rudolf Otto, became attracted to the ideals of the Völkisch movement, especially as Hauer began to move more towards developing his own religion.

Hauer began to look into his own forms of religion in 1927 when he set up the Religiöser Menschheitsbund, which aimed for a greater unity amongst Germany's faiths towards common goals. He joined with Ernst Graf zu Reventlow in this endeavour and in 1934 founded the German Faith Movement (Deutsche Glaubensbewegung), which combined a number of existing communities in a Völkisch faith influenced by Hinduism. Hauer's admiration for Hinduism centred on the Bhagavad Gita, to which he had been particularly drawn. He described it as "a work of imperishable significance", arguing that it called on people to "master the riddle of life". By July 1934 the religion had been ratified as Hauer celebrated his first wedding without other clergy.

It had initially been hoped that it might be adopted as the state religion of the Third Reich but this did not happen and as it began to decline Hauer left in 1936. Hauer remained close to the Nazis however. He became a member of the NSDAP in 1937 and liked to portray the German Faith Movement as the true religious expression of Nazism. He expected members of the movement to work together with Catholics and Protestants. He wrote to Heinrich Himmler immediately after Rudolf Hess' flight to Scotland, denouncing Hess for his supposed adherence to anthroposophy, an esoteric philosophy which Hauer felt was at odds with his own occult vision.

In later years Hauer would seek not only to distance himself from the Nazis but also to portray himself as an anthroposophist. In 1935, however, he wrote that:

every undertaking and activity of anthroposophy necessarily arises out of the Anthroposophical world view. The anthroposophical world view is in the most important points directly opposed to National Socialism. Therefore, schools which are built out of the anthroposophical world view and led by anthroposophists mean danger to true German education.

Hauer was removed from his university position after World War II and was interned from 1945 to 1949. He continued to agitate for his own religion, forming the Arbeitsgemeinschaft für freie Religionsforschung und Philosophie in 1947 and the Freie Akademie in 1955.

== Publications ==
- 1922: Werden und Wesen der Anthroposophie
- 1922: Die lAnfänge der Yogapraxis im alten Indien
- 1932: Indiens Kampf um das Reich
- 1932: Der Yoga als Heilweg
- 1934: Eine indo-arische Metaphysik des Kampfes und der Tat, die Bhagavadgita in neuer Sicht mit Übersetzungen
- 1934: Dt. Gottschau
- 1934: Was will die D.G.
- 1937: Glaubensgeschichte der Indogermanen
- 1941: Glaube und Blut
- 1941: Religion und Rasse
- 1950: Die Krise der Religion und ihre Überwindung
- 1952: Glauben und Wissen
