= Allard Pierson =

Dutch theologian, historian, and art historian (1831–1896)

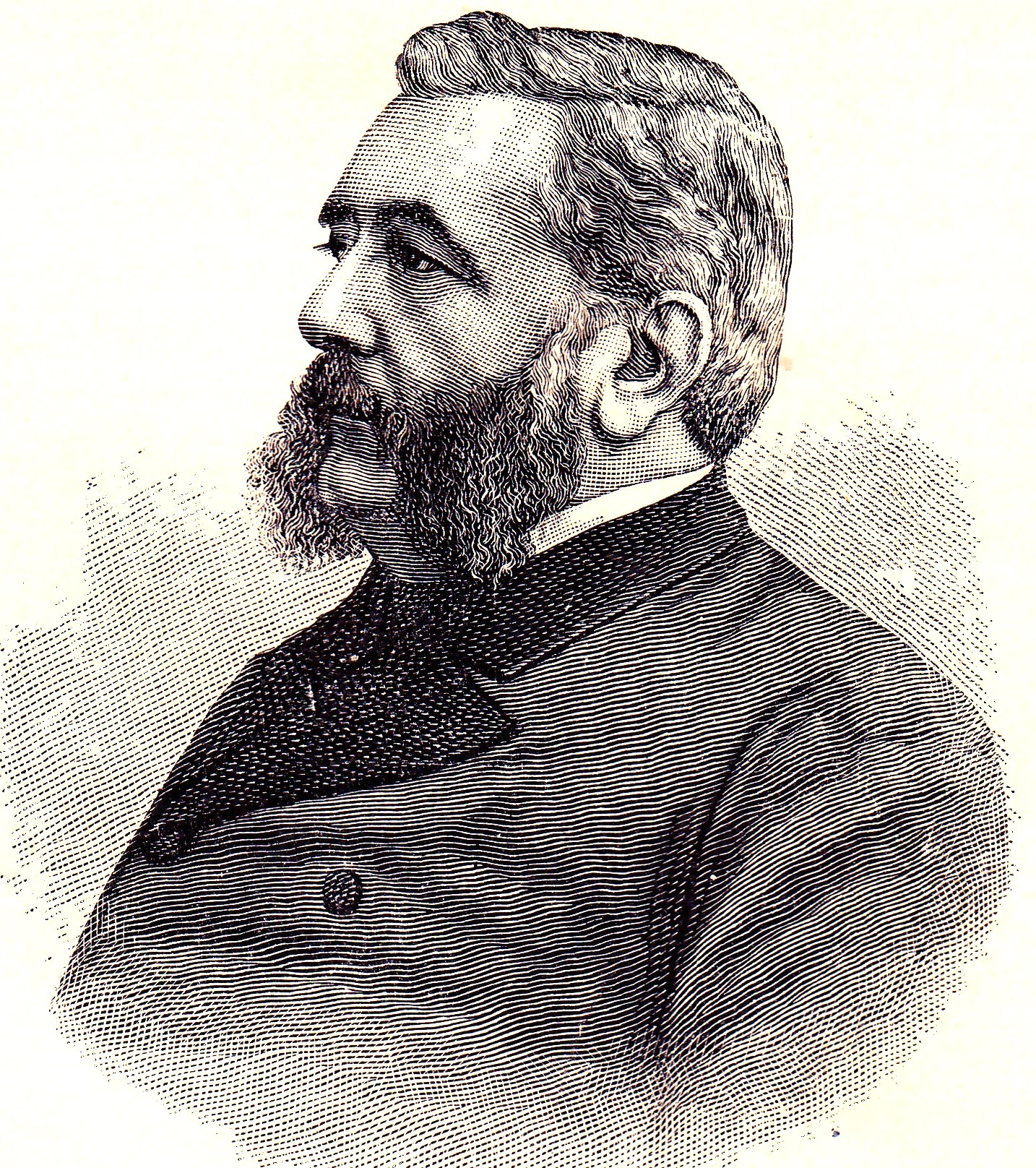
Allard Pierson

Allard Pierson (8 April 1831 – 27 May 1896) was a Dutch theologian, historian, and art historian. He was a leading proponent of radical criticism in the Netherlands.

== Life ==
Pierson's father was a merchant in Amsterdam, his mother an author of pietist works. The Walloon-origin family was prominent in the Christian revival movement of the Reveil and attended the meetings of Isaac da Costa and Nicolaas Beets. Pierson studied theology at Utrecht University, where he was influenced by Opzoomer. He became a Protestant minister in Leuven in 1854, and in 1857 in the Walloon church in Rotterdam, where he was highly esteemed. However, in 1865 he resigned because he could not reconcile being a minister with not believing in divine revelation. He moved to Heidelberg, where he worked on a history of Christianity. He also started to teach at the university there. From 1877 to 1895 Pierson was professor in history of art, aesthetics and modern languages at the University of Amsterdam. Pierson died in 1896 in the village Almen and he is buried in Zutphen. He was succeeded as professor by Jan Six, whom he had mentored as a student. Pierson's collection of antique objects, together with Six's, formed the basis of the Allard Pierson Museum.

== Theology ==
In 1878 Pierson published his book about the Sermon on the Mount and other passages from the synoptic gospels. He showed that sayings attributed to Jesus could be found in Jewish wisdom literature. The work also argued that Galatians, one of the core Pauline epistles, was pseudepigraphic. This is seen as the beginning of Dutch radical school.

Pierson was an advocate of the Christ myth theory. He held the view that the Pauline epistles were forgeries.
