= Radical criticism =

Movement that denied authentic authorship of the Pauline epistles

Radical criticism is a movement around the late 19th century that, typically, denied authentic authorship of the Pauline epistles. This went beyond the higher criticism of the Tübingen school which (with the exception of Bruno Bauer) held that a core of at least four epistles had been written by Paul of Tarsus in the 1st century.

== Dutch Radical School ==
The Dutch school of radical criticism started in 1878 with a publication by Allard Pierson, who denied Pauline authorship of Galatians. He was fiercely attacked by his colleague Abraham Dirk Loman, but two years later, also Loman abandoned the historicity of Paul. Similarly, Willem Christiaan van Manen, who had written a doctoral thesis defending the authenticity of 1 Thessalonians, wrote in 1889 that he had come to the same conclusions as Loman. Also, the philosopher Gerardus Johannes Petrus Josephus Bolland was a part of the movement. With the death of Van Manen's student Gustaaf Adolf van den Bergh van Eysinga in 1957, the line of scholarship at Dutch universities came to an end.

The name "Dutch Radicals" was coined by Loman, in an 1887 article reviewing Edwin Johnson ("Antiqua Mater: A Study of Christian Origins", 1887), saying that "the author is a radical like we seldom meet among theologians and hardly ever among English theologians". The RadikalKritik article on van Manen and the Dutch Radicals adds that "Van Manen later spoke of the 'radical' or the 'Dutch' school (1902). The 'radical' scholars did not want to be impeded by church canons and wanted to be free in their research of the New Testament and of the history of early Christianity. This research led them to the conclusion that we do not have any authentic Pauline epistles."

The Dutch school also influenced Rudolf Steck in Switzerland, and Arthur Drews in Germany. However, the works of Adolf Harnack proved more influential, and radical criticism was eventually abandoned and is now a fringe position in current New Testament scholarship.

Attempts to revive Radical criticism has been made by Robert M. Price, Darrell J. Doughty and Hermann Detering, who founded in 1994 the Journal of Higher Criticism. These attempts have largely been ignored by mainstream scholarship and have received strong criticism from Bart D. Ehrman, Maurice Casey and R. Joseph Hoffmann.

== Reception ==
Members of the Radical Dutch School argued against the existence of Jesus, which caused controversy. Robert Van Voorst wrote that "their arguments were stoutly attacked in the Netherlands, especially by other scholars, but largely ignored out it."

== Key proponents ==
- Gerard Bolland
- Hermann Detering
- Gustaaf Adolf van den Bergh van Eysinga
- Abraham Dirk Loman
- Willem Christiaan van Manen
- Allard Pierson
