= Rudolf Steck =

Swiss theologian and writer

Johann Rudolf Julius Steck (18 January 1842 – 30 November 1924) was a Swiss reformed theologian and writer.

Steck was a pastor of the Reformed Church, Dresden (1867-1881). From 1881 to 1921 he was Professor of Theology at the University of Bern. He was influenced by the writings of Bruno Bauer and was a proponent of the Christ myth theory. He believed that the Pauline epistles were a case of second century pseudepigrapha.

Steck argued that the Pauline letters were written by a school of people.

== Selected publications ==
- Der Galaterbrief nach seiner Echtheit untersucht nebst kritischen Bemerkungen zu den Paulinischen Hauptbriefen (1888) [Inquiry into the Genuineness of the Galatians Epistle, and Critical Remarks on the Chief Paulines]

== See also ==
- Radical criticism
