= Abraham Dirk Loman =

Dutch theologian

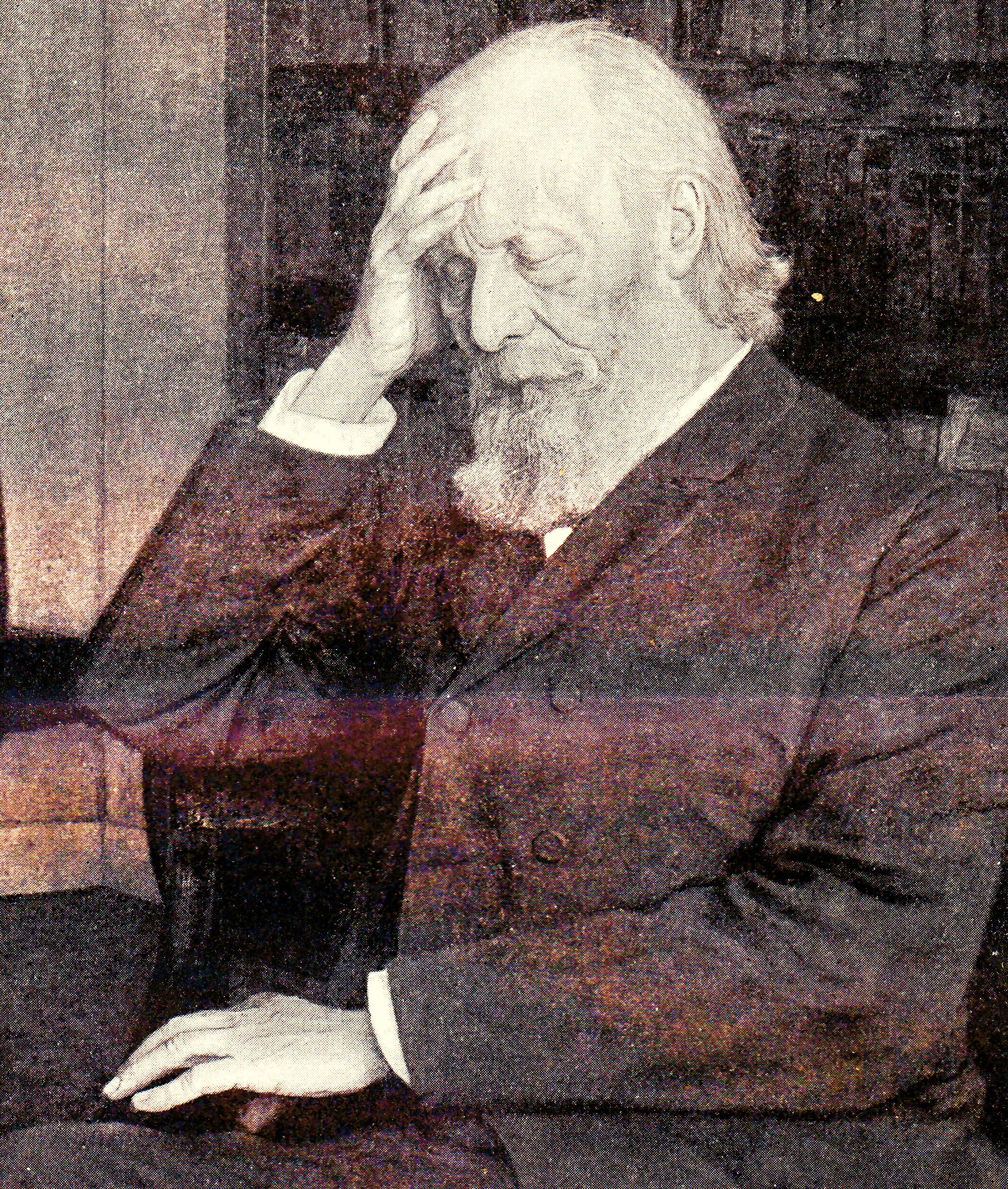
- Born: 16 September 1823; The Hague
- Died: 17 April 1897 (aged 73); Amsterdam
- Occupation: Theologian

Abraham Dirk Loman (16 September 1823, The Hague – 17 April 1897, Amsterdam) was a Dutch theologian. He was a professor from 1856 to 1893. In his later period he belonged to the Dutch radical critics.

== Life ==
Loman was the son of a minister in the Dutch Lutheran church. He started studying theology in 1840 and became a minister in 1846. In 1856 he became a professor at the Lutheran seminary in Amsterdam. Loman gradually lost his eyesight in the beginning of the 1870s, but continued working. From 1877 he also was a theology professor at the University of Amsterdam until his retirement in 1893. His son Rudolf Loman was Dutch Chess Champion.

== Work ==
Loman introduced modern theology in the Dutch Lutheran Church. He taught almost all disciplines of theology, but concentrated after 1867 on the New Testament and early Christian literature. He wrote a book about the Muratorian fragment, but published mostly in journals. His opinions mostly agreed with the Tübingen school. When his colleague Allard Pierson in 1878 denied the authenticity of Galatians, Loman wrote a fierce condemnation.

But after 1880 his views changed. He was an advocate of the Christ myth theory and caused great consternation by a public lecture on 13 December 1881 in the building of the Vrije Gemeente where he stated that Jesus is not a figure of history and that all we know about him is second-century fiction. In his Quaestiones Paulinae (1882, 1883, 1886) he abandoned Pauline authorship of Galatians. His arguments were that the Pauline epistles are not quoted by Justin Martyr and that the first datable references are by Marcion.
