= Hermann Detering =

Hermann Detering (1953 – October 2018) was a Berlin pastor skeptical of Paul's authorship of the Pauline epistles, in line with radical criticism. He identified the apostle Paul with Simon Magus, the Samaritan sorcerer who opposed Peter.

== Simon Magus as Paul ==
Many scholars, since Ferdinand Christian Baur in the 19th century, have concluded that the attacks on "Simon Magus" in the 4th century Pseudo-Clementines may be attacks on Paul. Detering takes the attacks of the Pseudo-Clementines as literal and historical, and suggests that the attacks of the Pseudo-Clementines are correct in identifying "Simon Magus" as a proxy for Paul of Tarsus, with Simon-Paul originally having been detested by the church, and the name changed to Paul when he was rehabilitated by virtue of forged Epistles correcting the genuine ones.

Detering's argument expands beyond the Pseudo-Clementines to include other apocrypha, arguing that Simon Magus is sometimes described in apocryphal legends in terms that would fit Paul, though most significantly in the Clementine Recognitions and Homilies. Detering contends that the common source of these documents may be as early as the 1st century in a polemic against Paul, emanating from the Jewish side of Christianity. Having thus identified Paul with Simon, Detering argues that Simon's visit to Rome (in the Pseudo-Clementines) had no other basis than being an account of Paul's presence there, and, further, that the tradition of Peter's residence in Rome rests on the assumed necessity of his resisting the arch-enemy of Judaism there as elsewhere. Thus, according to Detering, the idea of Peter at Rome originated with the Ebionites, but it was afterwards taken up by the Catholic Church, and then Paul was associated with Peter in opposition to Simon, who had originally been himself.

== Claims of Interpolation ==
John V. M. Sturdy, Hermann Detering, Robert M. Price, and David Oliver Smith have each argued that 1 Corinthians 15:3-7 is a later interpolation. According to these scholars, the text is not an early Christian creed written within five years of Jesus' death, nor did Paul write these verses. In their assessment, this verse's inclusion possibly dates to the beginning of the 2nd century. As the pair of words in verse 3a, 'received/delivered' (paralambanein/paradidonai) has often been pointed out before as being technical language for the handing on of rabbinical tradition, which they claim contradicts Paul's account of his conversion in Galatians where he had been taught by Jesus himself, not from any other man.

== Comments on Islam ==
On his blog Radikal Kritik, Detering made numerous comments about Muslim immigrants from Syria, largely blaming them for influxes of crime and not assimilating to German culture. These comments had sparked some controversy for Islamaphobia and Xenophobia. In another post, Detering decries the rise of violence from Muslims in Germany, though saying that peaceful Muslims are not the issue, stating that many questions about Islam's acceptance in Germany remained unanswered, such as controversially writing "Gehört die Aufteilung der Welt in Gläubige und Ungläubige auch zu Deutschland? Was ist mit Dschihad? Was ist mit Polygamie? Was ist mit der Todesstrafe für Apostaten? Was ist mit Körperstrafen für Diebe und Ehebrecher und Alkoholtrinker? Was ist mit Frauenrechten, die im Islam kaum vorhanden sind? Was ist mit Sklaverei, die im Islam nicht verboten ist?" (English: "Does the division of the world into believers and unbelievers also belong to Germany? What about jihad? What about polygamy? What about the death penalty for apostates? What about corporal punishment for thieves and adulterers and alcohol drinkers? What about women's rights, which are... Islam hardly exists? What about slavery, which is not forbidden in Islam?")

== Works ==
- Der gefälschte Paulus : das Urchristentum im Zwielicht (in German) (1. Aufl ed.). Patmos. 1995. ISBN 3491779693.; Published in English: Detering, Hermann (Fall 2003). "The Falsified Paul" (PDF). Journal of Higher Criticism. 10 (2). Translated by Darrell Daughty: 3–199.; English translation revised 2018: ISBN 978-1-981040-81-0 and ASIN B006XXX04G.
- Paulusbriefe ohne Paulus? Die Paulusbriefe in der holländischen Radikalkritik (Kontexte) (German Edition) (9783631447871):
- “The Dutch Radical Approach to the Pauline Epistles,” in Journal of Higher Criticism 3/2 (Fall, 1996)
