= Paul the Apostle =

Christian apostle and missionary (c. 5 – c. 64/65)

Saint Paul the Apostle
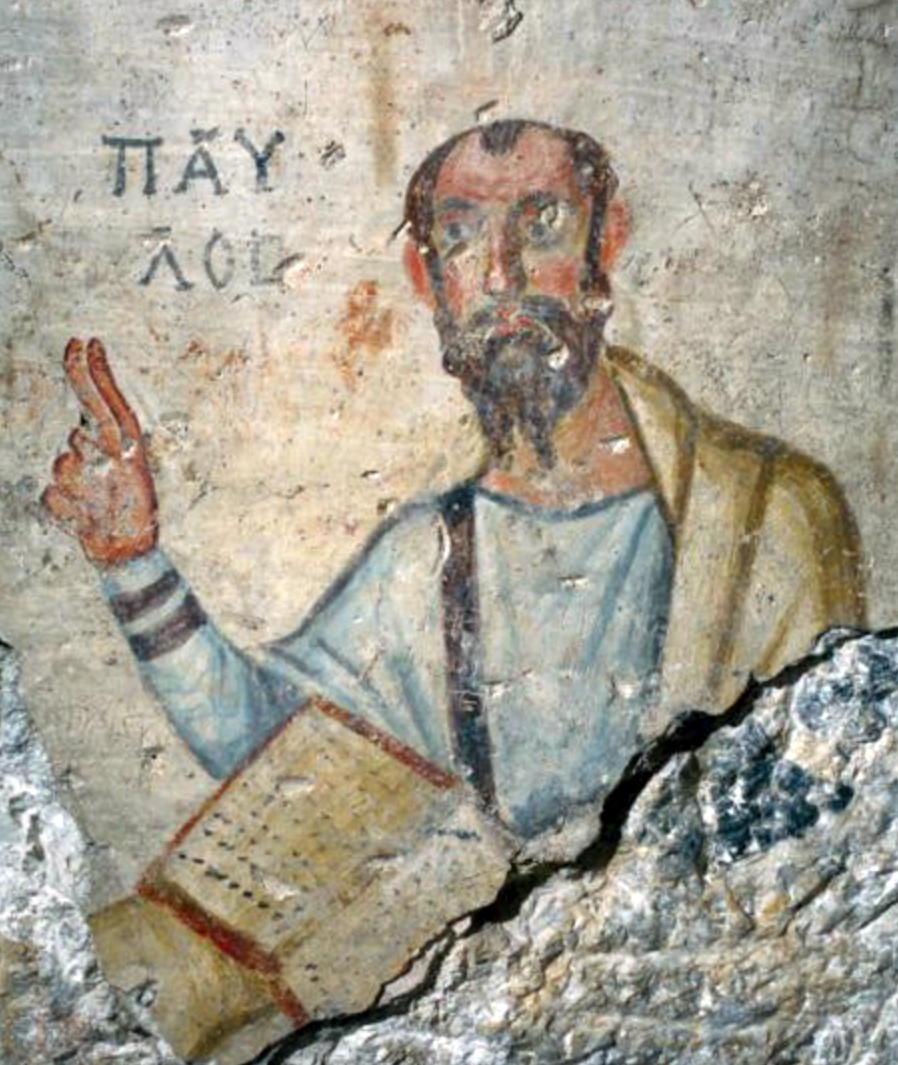
- Painting in the Grotto of St. Paul, Ephesus, late 5th century

Apostle to the Gentiles, Martyr
- Born: Saul of Tarsus c. 5 AD; Tarsus, Cilicia, Roman Empire
- Died: c. 64/65 AD; Rome, Italia, Roman Empire
- Venerated in: All Christian denominations that venerate saints
- Canonized: Pre-Congregation
- Major shrine: Basilica of Saint Paul Outside the Walls, Rome, Italy
- Feast: 25 January – Feast of the Conversion of Saint Paul; 30 June – solo feast day, still celebrated by some religious orders; 29 June – Feast of Saints Peter and Paul (with Peter the Apostle); 10 February – Feast of Saint Paul's Shipwreck in Malta; 18 November – Feast of the dedication of the basilicas of Saints Peter and Paul; Saturday before the sixth Sunday after Pentecost – Feast of the Twelve Apostles and Paul the thirteenth Apostle (Armenian Apostolic Church)
- Attributes: Christian martyrdom, sword, book
- Patronage: Missionaries, theologians, evangelists, and Gentile Christians, Malta
- Theology career
- Education: School of Gamaliel
- Occupations: Tentmaker, Christian missionary and preacher
- Notable work: Certain: Epistle to the Romans; Epistle to the Galatians; First Epistle to the Corinthians; Second Epistle to the Corinthians; First Epistle to the Thessalonians; Epistle to Philemon; Epistle to the Philippians; Disputed: Second Epistle to the Thessalonians; Epistle to the Colossians; Epistle to the Ephesians
- Theological work
- Era: Apostolic Age
- Language: Koine Greek
- Tradition or movement: Pauline Christianity
- Main interests: Torah, Christology, eschatology, soteriology, ecclesiology
- Notable ideas: Pauline privilege, Law of Christ, Holy Spirit, Unknown God, divinity of Jesus, thorn in the flesh, Pauline mysticism, biblical inspiration, supersessionism, non-circumcision, salvation

Paul (Note: Latin: Paulus; Koine Greek: Παῦλος, romanized: Paûlos; Coptic: ⲡⲁⲩⲗⲟⲥ; Hebrew: פאולוס השליח) (born Saul of Tarsus; (Note: Biblical Greek: Σαῦλος, romanized: Saûlos; Aramaic: שאול ܫܐܘܠ, romanized: Šāʾūl) c. 5 – c. 64/65 AD), commonly known as Paul the Apostle or Saint Paul, was a Christian apostle who spread the teachings of Jesus in the first century AD. For his contributions to the New Testament, he is generally regarded as one of the most important figures of the Apostolic Age, and he also founded several Christian communities in Asia Minor and Europe from the mid-40s to the mid-50s AD.

The main sources of information on Paul's life and works are Paul's letters and the Acts of the Apostles in the New Testament. Approximately half of their contents document his travels, preaching, and miracles. While he was not one of the Twelve Apostles and did not know Jesus during his lifetime, but claims to have met him post-resurrection, Paul was a contemporary of Jesus and personally knew eyewitnesses of Jesus such as his closest disciples (Peter and John) and brother James since the mid 30s AD, within a few years of the crucifixion (c. 30–33 AD). He had knowledge of the life of Jesus and his teachings. (Note: Some examples of Paul's knowledge of the life and teachings of Jesus : born of a woman (Gal 4:4), from David's lineage (Rom 1:3); upbringing as Jew under the Law (Gal 4:4); had 12 apostles (1 Cor 15:5) and siblings (Gal 1:19, 1 Cor 9:5); the Last Supper and was betrayed (1 Cor 11:23-25); was crucified (1 Cor 2:2, Gal 3:1); Jewish involvement in his death (1 Thess 2:14-15); burial, resurrection, appearances to others (1 Cor 15:4-8); Sermon on the Mount allusions (Rom 12:17-19), paying taxes message echoes "Render to Caesar," although, not direct quote (Rom 13:7), divorce and marriage (1 Cor 7:10)) Paul argued over issues such as the circumcision of gentiles, while his exalted Christology was taken for granted and widely accepted in the early church. According to Acts, Paul was a Pharisee and participated in the persecution of early disciples of Jesus before his conversion. (Note: Acts 8:1 "at Jerusalem"; Acts 9:13 "at Jerusalem"; Acts 9:21 "in Jerusalem"; Acts 26:10 "in Jerusalem". In Galatians 1:13, Paul states that he "persecuted the church of God and tried to destroy it," but does not specify where he persecuted the church. In Galatians 1:22 he states that more than three years after his conversion he was "still unknown by sight to the churches of Judea that are in Christ," seemingly ruling out Jerusalem as the place he had persecuted Christians.) On his way to arrest Christians in Damascus, Paul saw a bright light, heard Christ speak, was blinded, and later healed by Ananias. After these events, Paul was baptized, beginning immediately to proclaim that Jesus of Nazareth was the Jewish messiah and the Son of God. He made three missionary journeys to spread the Christian message to non-Jewish communities.

Fourteen of the 27 books in the New Testament have traditionally been attributed to Paul. Seven of the Pauline epistles are undisputed by scholars as being authentic. Of the other six, Ephesians, 1 and 2 Timothy, and Titus are generally considered pseudepigraphical, while Colossians and 2 Thessalonians are debated. Pauline authorship of the Epistle to the Hebrews is almost universally rejected by scholars. The other six are believed by some scholars to have come from followers writing in his name, using material from Paul's surviving letters and letters written by him that no longer survive. (Note: Paul's undisputed epistles are 1 Thessalonians, Galatians, 1 and 2 Corinthians, Romans, Philippians, and Philemon. The six letters believed by some to have been written by Paul are Ephesians, Colossians, 2 Thessalonians, 1 Timothy, 2 Timothy, and Titus.)

Today, Paul's epistles continue to be vital roots of the theology, worship, and pastoral life in the Latin and Protestant traditions of the West, as well as the Eastern Catholic and Orthodox traditions of the East. Paul's influence on Christian thought and practice is pervasive in scope and profound in impact. Christians, particularly in the Lutheran tradition, have read Paul as saying that people are saved through faith rather than by following Jewish law. He has been accused of corrupting or hijacking Christianity, often by introducing pagan or Hellenistic themes to the early church. There has been increasing acceptance of Paul as a fundamentally Jewish figure in line with the original disciples in Jerusalem over past interpretations, manifested through movements like "Paul Within Judaism".

== Names ==
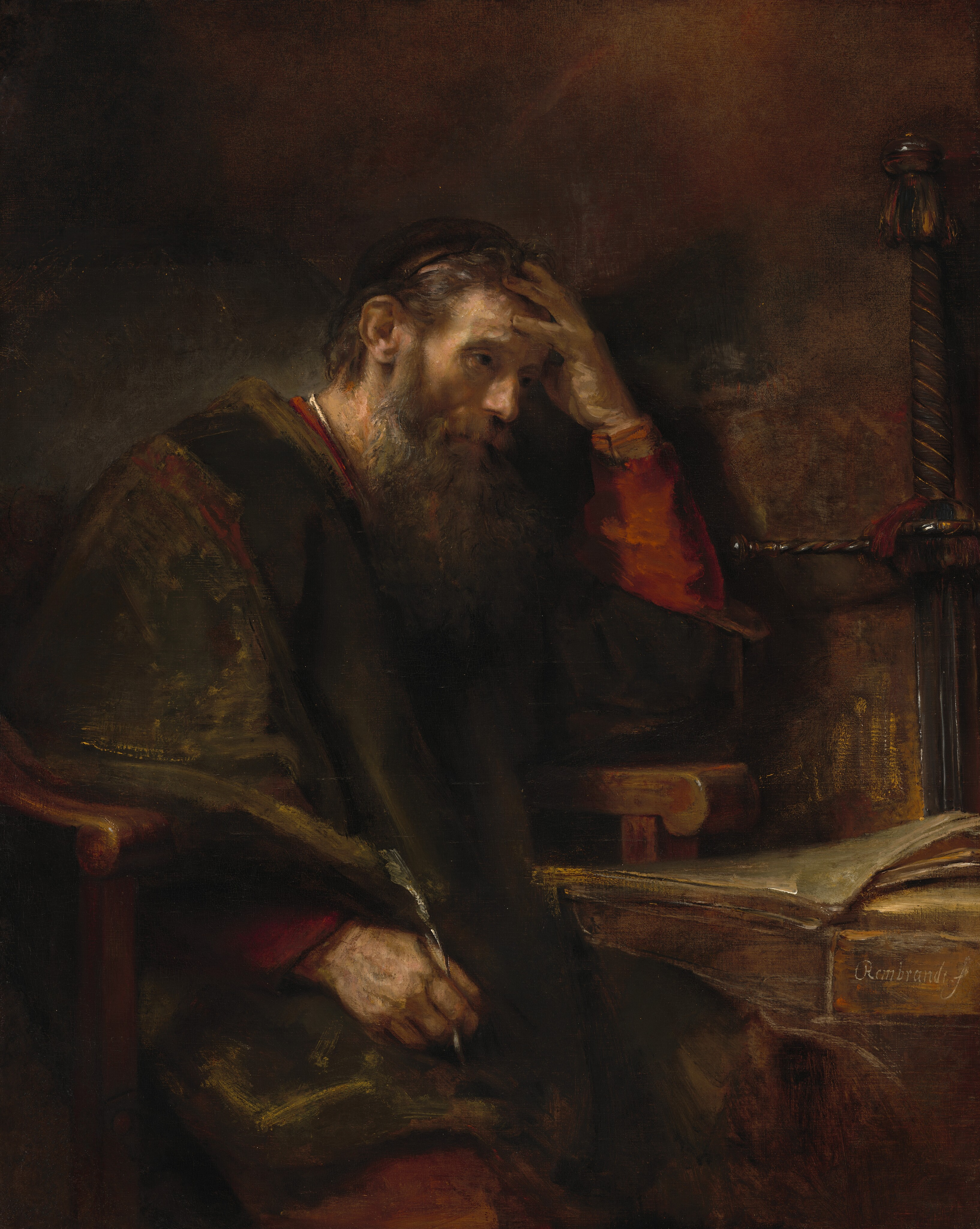
The Apostle Paul, portrait by Rembrandt (c. 1657)

Paul's Jewish name was "Saul" (Hebrew: שָׁאוּל, Modern: Sha'ûl, Tiberian: Šā'ûl), perhaps after the biblical King Saul, the first king of Israel and, like Paul, a member of the Tribe of Benjamin; the Latin name Paulus, meaning small, was not a result of his conversion as is commonly believed but a second name for use in communicating with a Greco-Roman audience.

According to the Acts of the Apostles, he was a Roman citizen. As such, he bore the Latin name Paulus, which is transliterated in biblical Greek as Παῦλος (Paulos). It was not uncommon for the Jews of that time to have two names: one Hebrew, the other Latin or Greek.

Jesus called him "Saul" in "the Hebrew tongue" in the Acts of the Apostles, when he had the vision which led to his conversion on the road to Damascus. Later, in a vision to Ananias of Damascus, "the Lord" referred to him as "Saul, of Tarsus". When Ananias came to restore his sight, he called him "Brother Saul".

In Acts 13:9, Saul is called "Paul" for the first time on the island of Cyprus, much later than the time of his conversion. The author of Luke–Acts indicates that the names were interchangeable: "Saul, who also is called Paul." He refers to him as Paul through the remainder of Acts, except in the accounts of the events that occurred on his way to Damascus, where it is reported that the voice from heaven, and, later, Ananias of Damascus, called him Σαούλ, a Greek transliteration of the Hebrew name (Acts 9:4, 17; 22:7, 13; 26:14). Paul was apparently Paul's own preference, since he always refers to himself as Paul in his letters (18 times in the letters generally regarded as written by Paul himself, and 10 more times in the other "Pauline" letters). Adopting his Roman name was typical of Paul's missionary style. His method was to put people at ease and approach them with his message in a language and style that was relatable to them, as he did in 1 Corinthians 9:19–23.

If Saul/Paul was born a Roman citizen, as in Acts and contemporary scholarship, his parents, and perhaps their ancestors, must have been Roman citizens as well. Hence, he would probably have been given a full Roman name at birth, the tria nomina of praenomen, nomen, and cognomen, with Paulus as his cognomen. There is no information about the Roman patron of Paul's ancestors, or the ruler at the time of their enfranchisement, but if Paul's ancestors had been granted Roman citizenship under the auspices of Gaius Julius Caesar, for example, Paul's full name may have been Γάϊος Ἰούλιος Παῦλος ὁ καὶ Σαούλ, when expressed in Greek, and C. Julius Paulus qui est Saul, when expressed in Latin.

== Available sources ==
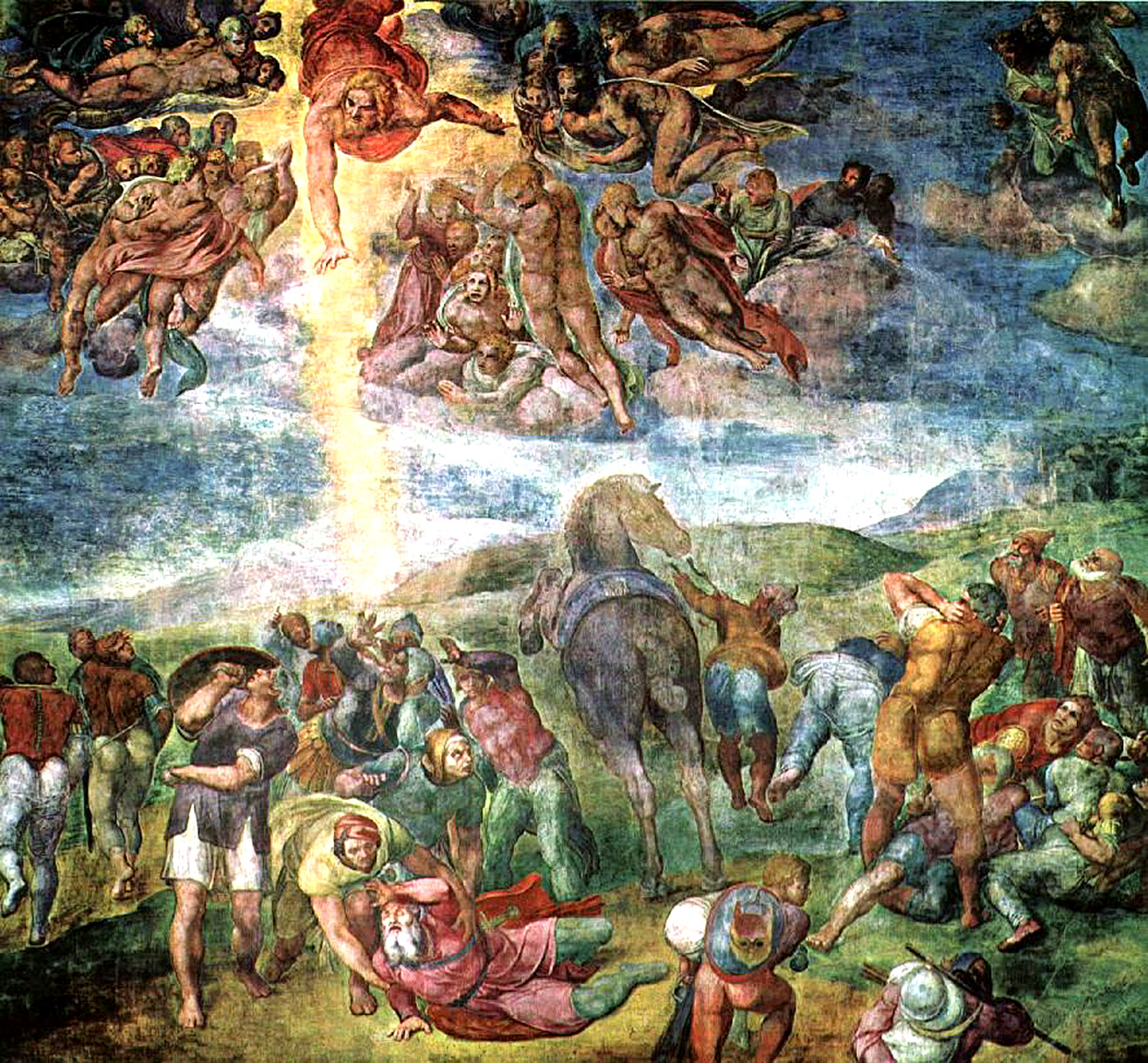
The Conversion of Saul, a fresco by Michelangelo developed between 1542 and 1545

The main source for information about Paul's life is the material found in his epistles and in the Acts of the Apostles, the sequel to the Gospel of Luke. However, the epistles contain little information about Paul's pre-conversion past. The Acts of the Apostles recounts more information but leaves several parts of Paul's life out of its narrative, such as his probable but undocumented execution in Rome. Although recent scholarship tends to have a more favorable appraisal of the historical value of Acts, the Pauline epistles are preferred when differences between the two arise. Recent scholarship has challenged the idea that the Paul of Acts and the letters share little resemblance.

Sources outside the New Testament that mention Paul (or at least his writings) include:

- Clement of Rome's epistle to the Corinthians (late 1st/early 2nd century);
- Ignatius of Antioch's epistles to the Romans and to the Ephesians (early 2nd century);
- Polycarp's epistle to the Philippians (early 2nd century);
- Eusebius's Historia Ecclesiae (early 4th century);
- The apocryphal Acts narrating the life of Paul (Acts of Paul, Acts of Paul and Thecla, Acts of Peter and Paul), the apocryphal epistles attributed to him (the Latin Epistle to the Laodiceans, the Third Epistle to the Corinthians, and the Correspondence of Paul and Seneca) and some apocalyptic texts attributed to him (Apocalypse of Paul and Coptic Apocalypse of Paul). These writings are all later, usually dated from the 2nd to the 4th century.

== Life and career ==
=== Early life ===
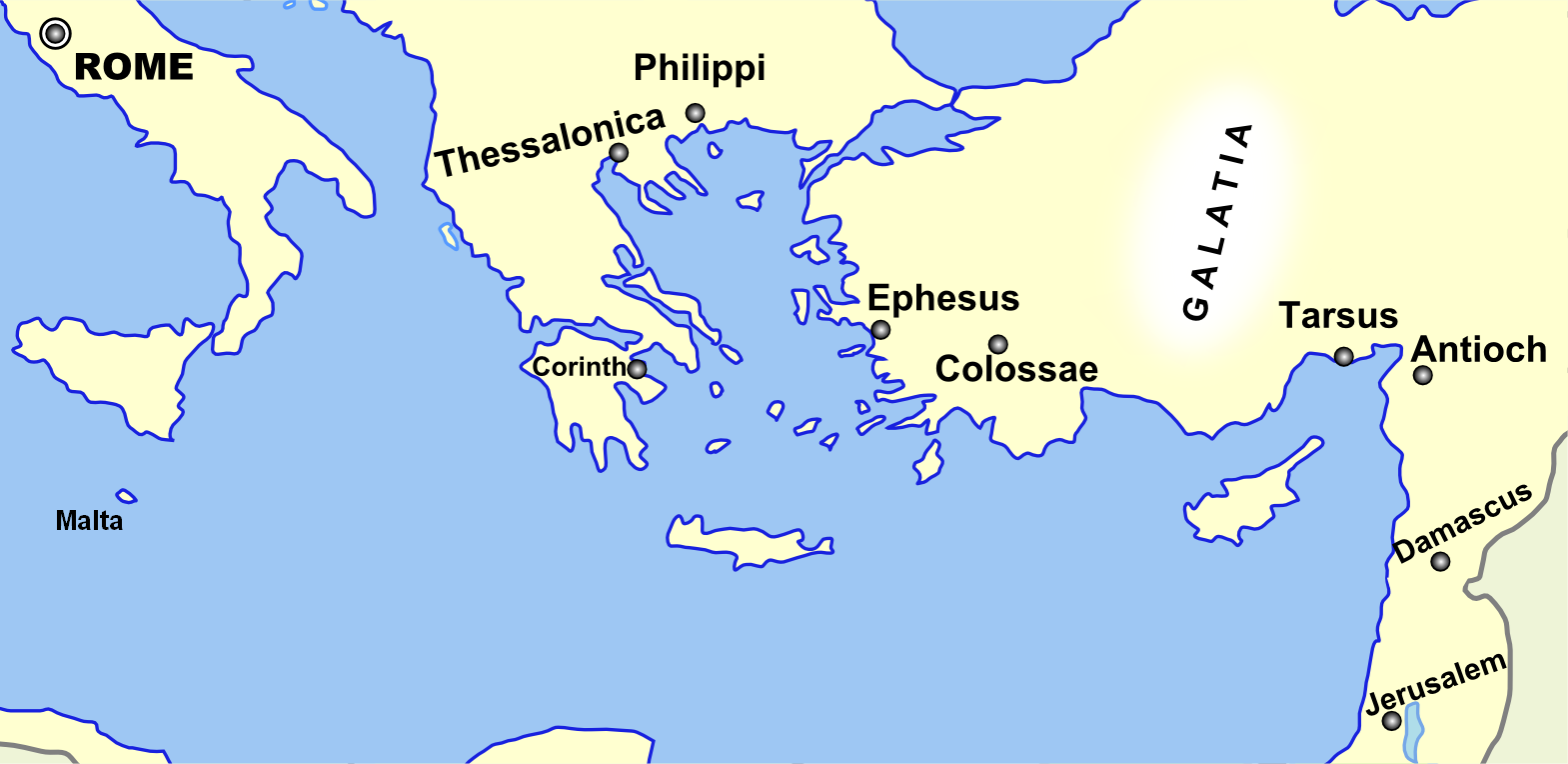
Geography relevant to Paul's life, stretching from Jerusalem to Rome

The two main sources of information that give access to the earliest segments of Paul's career are the Acts of the Apostles and the autobiographical elements of Paul's letters to the early Christian communities. Paul was likely born between the years of 5 BC and 5 AD. The Acts of the Apostles indicates that Paul was a Roman citizen by birth, and scholars largely accept this claim. Some have suggested that Paul's ancestors may have been freedmen from among the thousands of Jews whom Pompey took as slaves in 63 BC, which would explain how he was born into Roman citizenship, as slaves of Roman citizens gained citizenship upon emancipation.

He was from a devout Jewish family. The Book of Acts and modern scholars agree that Paul came from the city of Tarsus, which was part of the Roman province of Cilicia. Tarsus was one of the larger centers of trade on the Mediterranean coast and renowned for its academy. It had been among the most influential cities in Asia Minor since the time of Alexander the Great, who died in 323 BC.

Paul referred to himself as being "of the stock of Israel, of the tribe of Benjamin, a Hebrew of the Hebrews; as touching the law, a Pharisee". The Bible reveals very little about Paul's family. Acts quotes Paul referring to his family by saying he was "a Pharisee, born of Pharisees". Paul's nephew, his sister's son, is mentioned in Acts 23:16.

The family had a history of religious piety. (Note: 1 Timothy, 2 Timothy, and Titus may be "Trito-Pauline", meaning they may have been written by members of the Pauline school a generation after his death.) Apparently, the family lineage had been very attached to Pharisaic traditions and observances for generations. Acts says that he was an artisan involved in the leather crafting or tent-making profession. This was to become an initial connection with Priscilla and Aquila, with whom he would partner in tent-making and later become very important teammates as fellow missionaries.

While he was still fairly young, he was sent to Jerusalem to receive his education at the school of Gamaliel, one of the most noted teachers of Jewish law in history. Although modern scholarship accepts that Paul was educated under the supervision of Gamaliel in Jerusalem, he was not preparing to become a scholar of Jewish law, and probably never had any contact with the Hillelite school. Some of his family may have resided in Jerusalem since later the son of one of his sisters saved his life there. Nothing more is known of his biography until he takes an active part in the martyrdom of Stephen, a Hellenised diaspora Jew.

Some modern scholarship argues that while Paul was fluent in Koine Greek, the language he used to write his letters, his first language was probably Aramaic. In his letters, Paul drew heavily on his knowledge of Stoic philosophy, using Stoic terms and metaphors to assist his new Gentile converts in their understanding of the Gospel and to explain his Christology.

=== Persecutor of early Christians ===
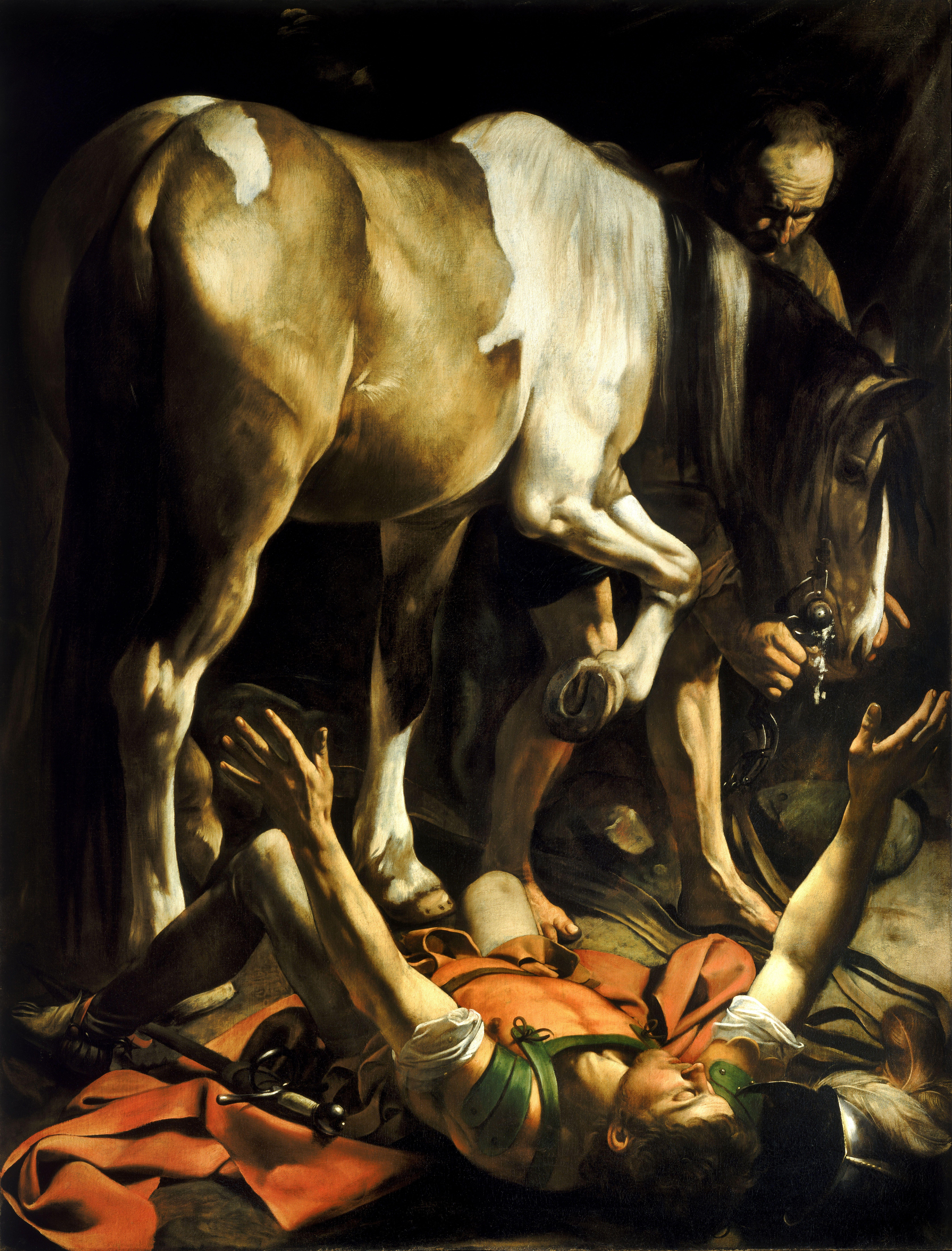
Conversion on the Way to Damascus, a 1601 portrait by Caravaggio

Paul says that before his conversion, he persecuted early Christians "beyond measure", more specifically Hellenised diaspora Jewish members who had returned to the area of Jerusalem. Paul does not describe explicitly what form this persecution took. According to James Dunn, the Jerusalem community consisted of "Hebrews", Jews speaking both Aramaic and Greek, and "Hellenists", Jews speaking only Greek, possibly diaspora Jews who had resettled in Jerusalem. Paul's initial persecution of Christians probably was directed against these Greek-speaking "Hellenists" due to their anti-Temple attitude. Within the early Jewish Christian community, this also set them apart from the "Hebrews" and their continuing participation in the Temple cult.

=== Conversion ===
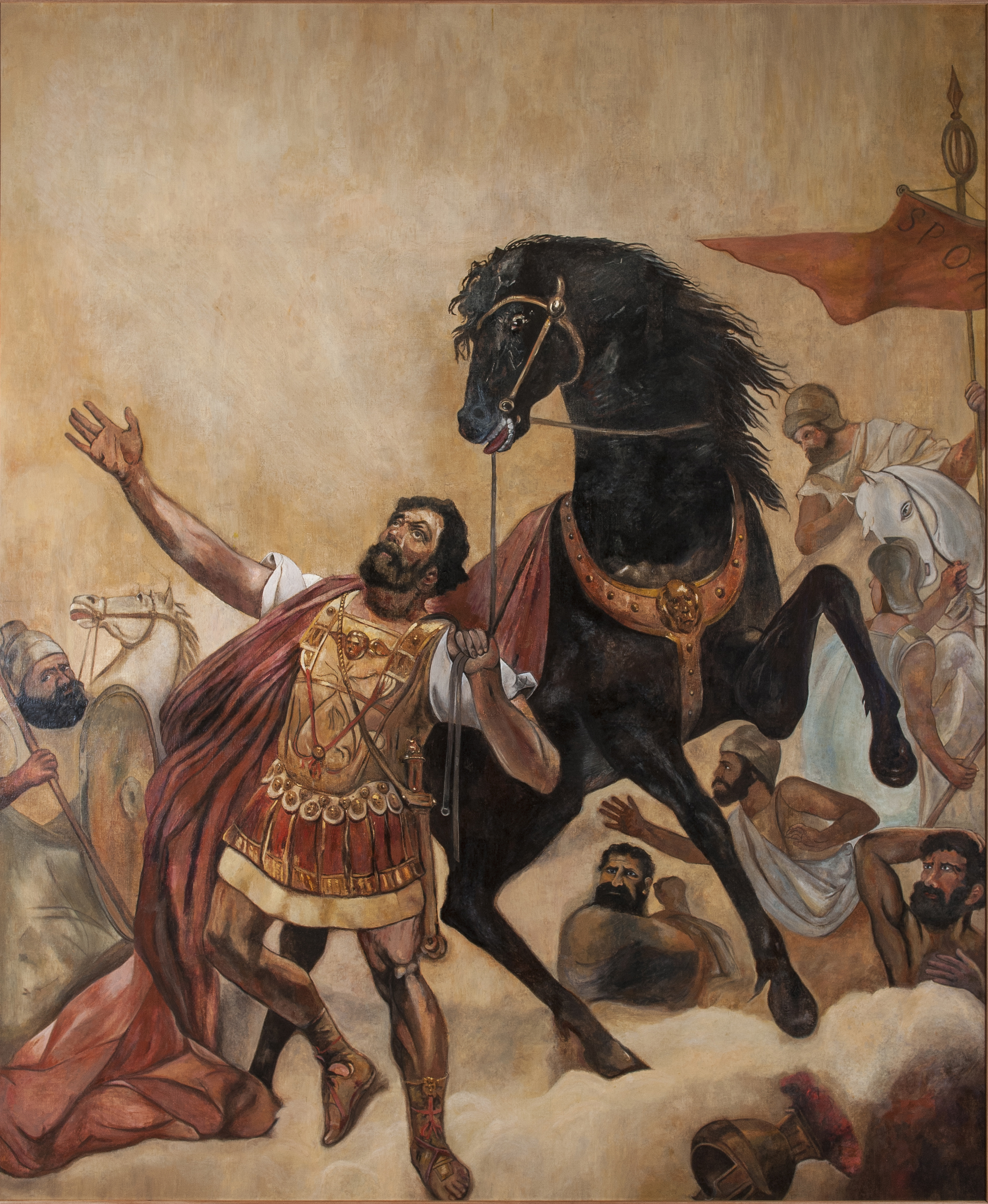
The Conversion of Saint Paul on the Way to Damascus, a c. 1889 portrait by Almeida Júnior

Paul's conversion to the movement of followers of Jesus has been dated to 31–36 AD by his reference to it in one of his letters. Paul was already speaking about Jesus in 32 CE, two years after the crucifixion. In Galatians 1:16, Paul writes that God "was pleased to reveal his son to me." In 1 Corinthians 15:8, as he lists the order in which Jesus appeared to his disciples after his resurrection, Paul writes, "last of all, as to one untimely born, He appeared to me also," without an explicit description of how long after.

According to the account in the Acts of the Apostles, it took place on the road to Damascus, where he reported having experienced a vision of the ascended Jesus. The account says that "He fell to the ground and heard a voice saying to him, 'Saul, Saul, why do you persecute me?' He asked, 'Who are you, Lord?' The reply came, 'I am Jesus, whom you are persecuting'."

According to the account in Acts 9:1–22, he was blinded for three days and had to be led into Damascus by the hand. During these three days, Saul took no food or water and spent his time in prayer to God. When Ananias of Damascus arrived, he laid his hands on him and said: "Brother Saul, the Lord Jesus, that appeared unto thee in the way as thou camest, hath sent me, that thou mightest receive thy sight, and be filled with the Holy Spirit." His sight was restored, he got up and was baptized. This story occurs only in Acts, not in the Pauline epistles.

The author of the Acts of the Apostles may have learned of Paul's conversion from the church in Jerusalem, or from the church in Antioch, or possibly from Paul himself.

According to Timo Eskola, early Christian theology and discourse was influenced by the Jewish Merkabah tradition. John Bowker, Alan Segal and Daniel Boyarin have variously argued that Paul's accounts of his conversion experience and his ascent to the heavens (in 2 Corinthians 12) are the earliest first-person accounts that are extant of a Merkabah mystic in Jewish or Christian literature. Conversely, Timothy Churchill has argued that Paul's Damascus road encounter does not fit the pattern of Merkabah.

=== Post-conversion ===
According to Acts:

And immediately he proclaimed Jesus in the synagogues, saying, "He is the Son of God." And all who heard him were amazed and said, "Is not this the man who made havoc in Jerusalem of those who called upon this name? And has he not come here for this purpose, to bring them bound before the chief priests?" But Saul increased all the more in strength, and confounded the Jews who lived in Damascus by proving that Jesus was the Christ.

— Acts 9:20–22

=== Early ministry ===
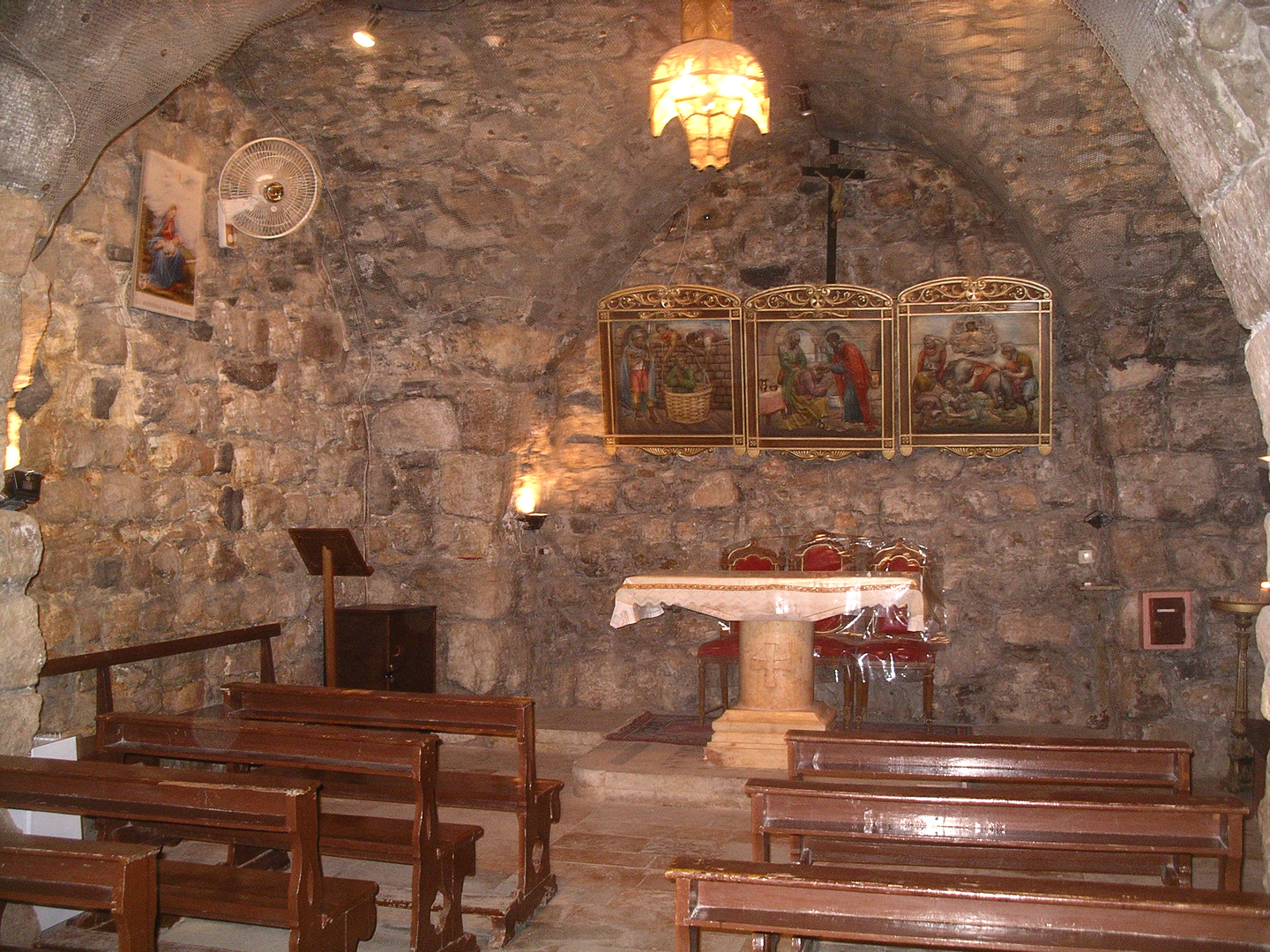
What is believed to be the house of Ananias of Damascus in Damascus

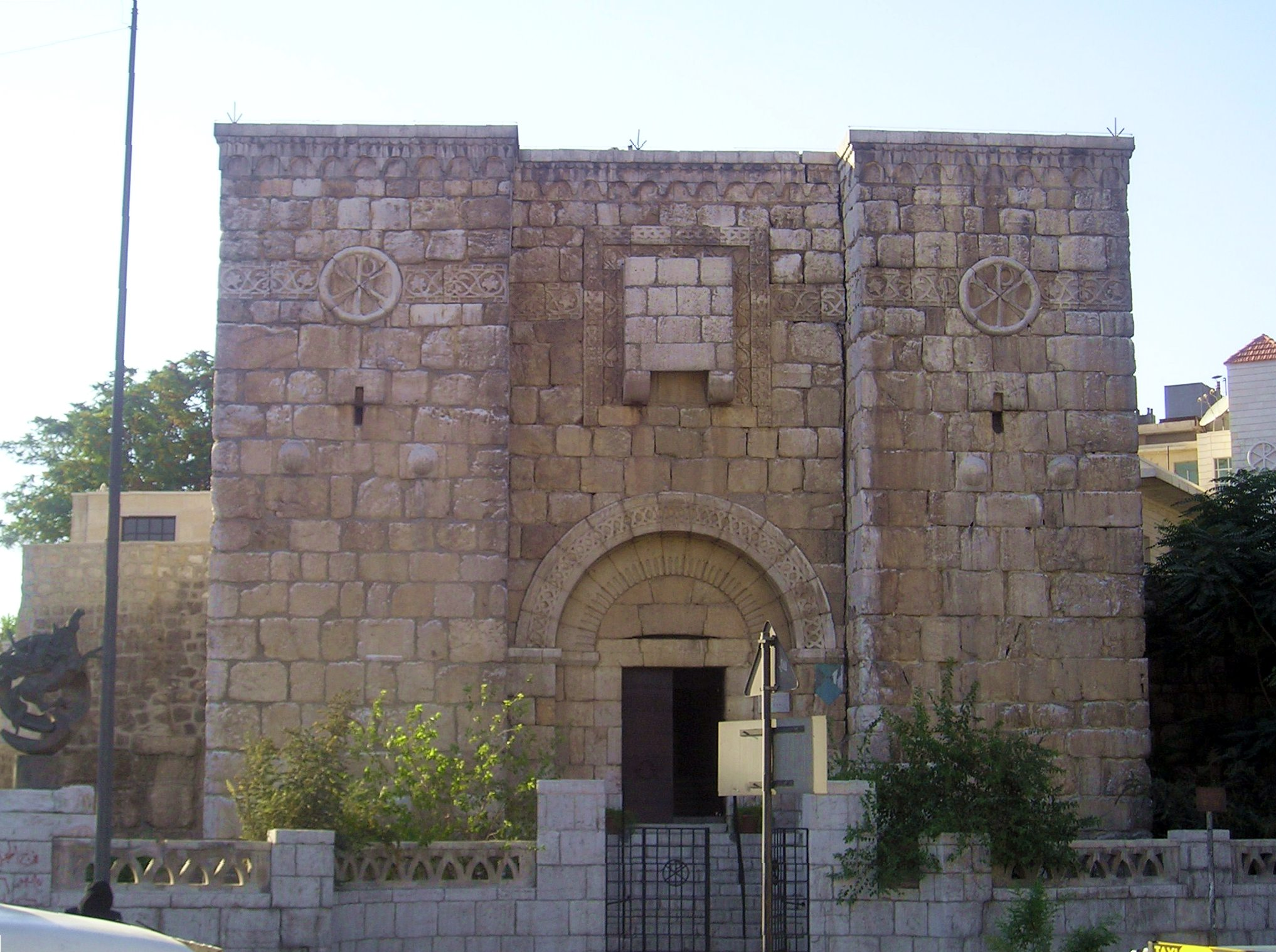
Bab Kisan, believed to be where Paul escaped from persecution in Damascus

After his conversion, Paul went to Damascus, where Acts 9 states he was healed of his blindness and baptized by Ananias of Damascus. Paul says that it was in Damascus that he barely escaped death. Paul also says that he then went first to Arabia, and then came back to Damascus. Paul's trip to Arabia is not mentioned anywhere else in the Bible, although it has been theorized that he traveled to Mount Sinai for meditations in the desert. He describes in Galatians how three years after his conversion he went to Jerusalem. There he met James and stayed with Simon Peter for 15 days starting around 35 or 36 AD. Paul located Mount Sinai in Arabia in Galatians 4:24–25.

Paul asserted that he received the Gospel not from man, but directly by "the revelation of Jesus Christ". He claimed almost total independence from the Jerusalem community (possibly in the Cenacle), but agreed with it on the nature and content of the gospel. He appeared eager to bring material support to Jerusalem from the various growing Gentile churches that he started. In his writings, Paul used the persecutions he endured to avow proximity and union with Jesus and as a validation of his teaching.

Paul's narrative in Galatians states that 14 years after his conversion he went again to Jerusalem. It is not known what happened during this time, but both Acts and Galatians provide some details. At the end of this time, Barnabas went to find Paul and brought him to Antioch. The Christian community at Antioch had been established by Hellenised diaspora Jews living in Jerusalem, who played an important role in reaching a Gentile, Greek audience, notably at Antioch, which had a large Jewish community and significant numbers of Gentile "God-fearers." From Antioch the mission to the Gentiles started, which would fundamentally change the character of the early Christian movement, eventually turning it into a new, Gentile religion.

When a famine occurred in Judea, around 45–46, Paul and Barnabas journeyed to Jerusalem to deliver financial support from the Antioch community. According to Acts, Antioch had become an alternative center for Christians following the dispersion of the believers after the death of Stephen. It was in Antioch that the followers of Jesus were first called "Christians".

=== First missionary journey ===
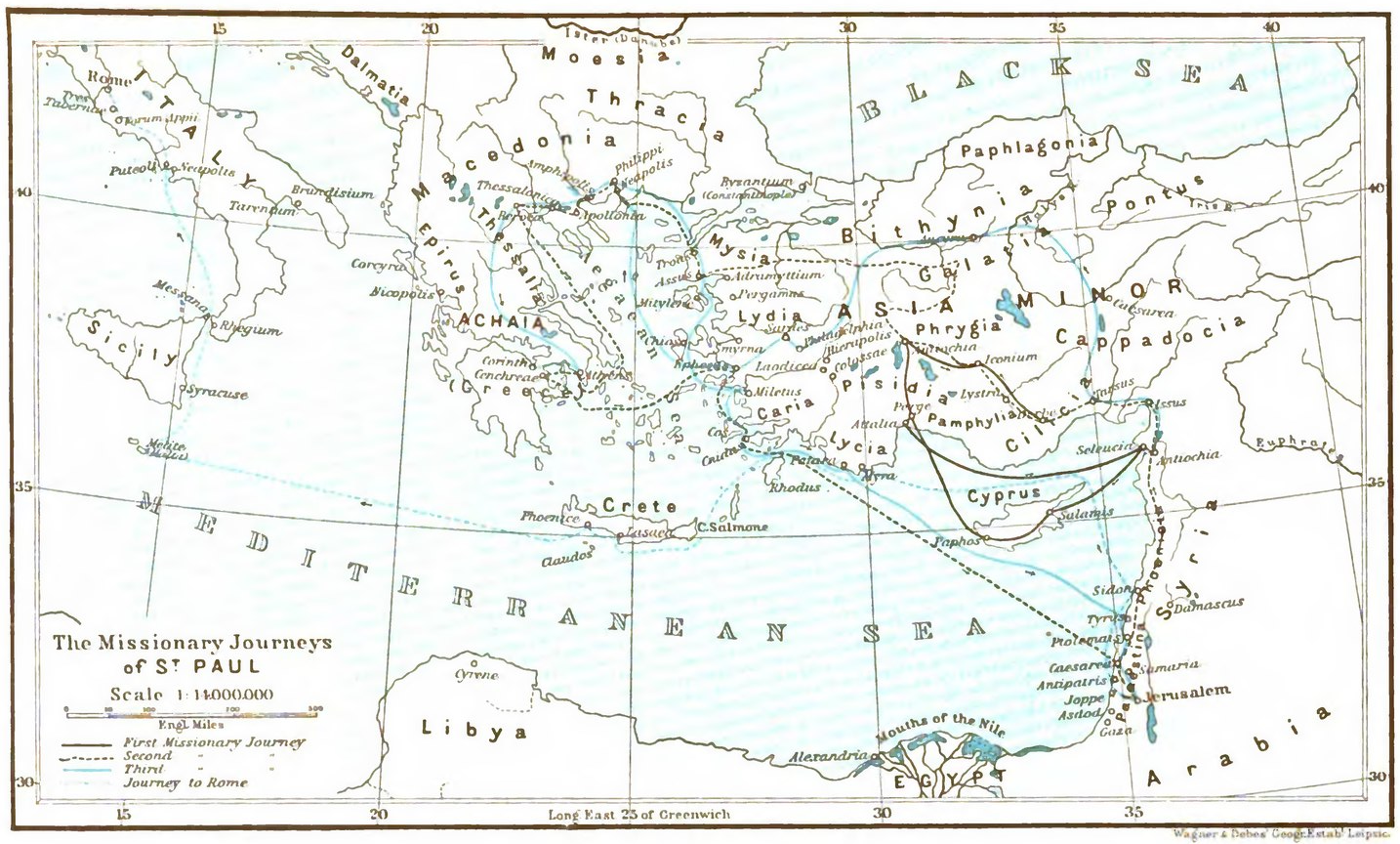
Map of St. Paul's missionary journeys

It has been estimated that the apostle Paul traveled over 12,000 kilometres by land and over 8,000 kilometres by sea just on the journeys that he made in the latter half of his life that happen to be recorded in the Acts of the Apostles.

The author of Acts arranges Paul's missionary journeys into three separate accounts. The first journey, for which Paul and Barnabas were commissioned by the Antioch community, and led initially by Barnabas, (Note: The only indication as to who is leading is in the order of names. At first, the two are referred to as Barnabas and Paul, in that order. Later in the same chapter, the team is referred to as Paul and his companions.) took Barnabas and Paul from Antioch to Cyprus then into southern Asia Minor, and finally returning to Antioch. In Cyprus, Paul rebukes and blinds Elymas the magician who was criticizing their teachings.

They sailed to Perga in Pamphylia. John Mark left them and returned to Jerusalem. Paul and Barnabas went on to Pisidian Antioch. On Sabbath they went to the synagogue. The leaders invited them to speak. Paul reviewed Israelite history from life in Egypt to King David. He introduced Jesus as a descendant of David brought to Israel by God. He said that his group had come to bring the message of salvation. He recounted the story of Jesus' death and resurrection. He quoted from the Septuagint to assert that Jesus was the promised Christos who brought them forgiveness for their sins. Both the Jews and the "God-fearing" Gentiles invited them to talk more next Sabbath. At that time almost the whole city gathered. This upset some influential Jews who spoke against them. Paul used the occasion to announce a change in his mission which from then on would be to the Gentiles.

Antioch served as a major Christian home base for Paul's early missionary activities, and he remained there for "a long time with the disciples" at the conclusion of his first journey. The exact duration of Paul's stay in Antioch is unknown, with estimates ranging from nine months to as long as eight years.

In Raymond E. Brown's An Introduction to the New Testament, published in 1997, a chronology of events in Paul's life is presented, illustrated from later 20th-century writings of biblical scholars. The first missionary journey of Paul is assigned a "traditional" (and majority) dating of 46–49 AD, compared to a "revisionist" (and minority) dating of after 37 AD.

=== Council of Jerusalem ===
A vital meeting between Paul and the Jerusalem church took place in the year AD 49 by traditional (and majority) dating, compared to a revisionist (and minority) dating of AD 47 or 51. The meeting is described in Acts 15:2 and usually seen as the same event mentioned by Paul in Galatians The key question raised was whether Gentile converts needed to be circumcised. At this meeting, Peter, James, and John, who Paul calls Pillars of the Church, accepted Paul's mission to the Gentiles.

The Jerusalem meetings are mentioned in Acts, and also in Paul's letters. For example, the Jerusalem visit for famine relief apparently corresponds to the "first visit" (to Peter and James only). F. F. Bruce suggested that the "fourteen years" could be from Paul's conversion rather than from his first visit to Jerusalem.

=== Incident at Antioch ===
Despite the agreement achieved at the Council of Jerusalem, Paul recounts how he later publicly confronted Peter in a dispute sometimes called the "Incident at Antioch", over Peter's reluctance to share a meal with Gentile Christians in Antioch because they did not strictly adhere to Jewish customs.

Writing later of the incident, Paul recounts, "I opposed [Peter] to his face, because he was clearly in the wrong", and says he told Peter, "You are a Jew, yet you live like a Gentile and not like a Jew. How is it, then, that you force Gentiles to follow Jewish customs?" Paul also mentions that even Barnabas, his traveling companion and fellow apostle until that time, sided with Peter.

The outcome of the incident remains uncertain. The Catholic Encyclopedia suggests that Paul won the argument, because "Paul's account of the incident leaves no doubt that Peter saw the justice of the rebuke". However, Paul himself never mentions a victory, and L. Michael White's From Jesus to Christianity draws the opposite conclusion: "The blowup with Peter was a total failure of political bravado, and Paul soon left Antioch as persona non grata, never again to return".

The primary source account of the incident at Antioch is Paul's letter to the Galatians.

=== Second missionary journey ===
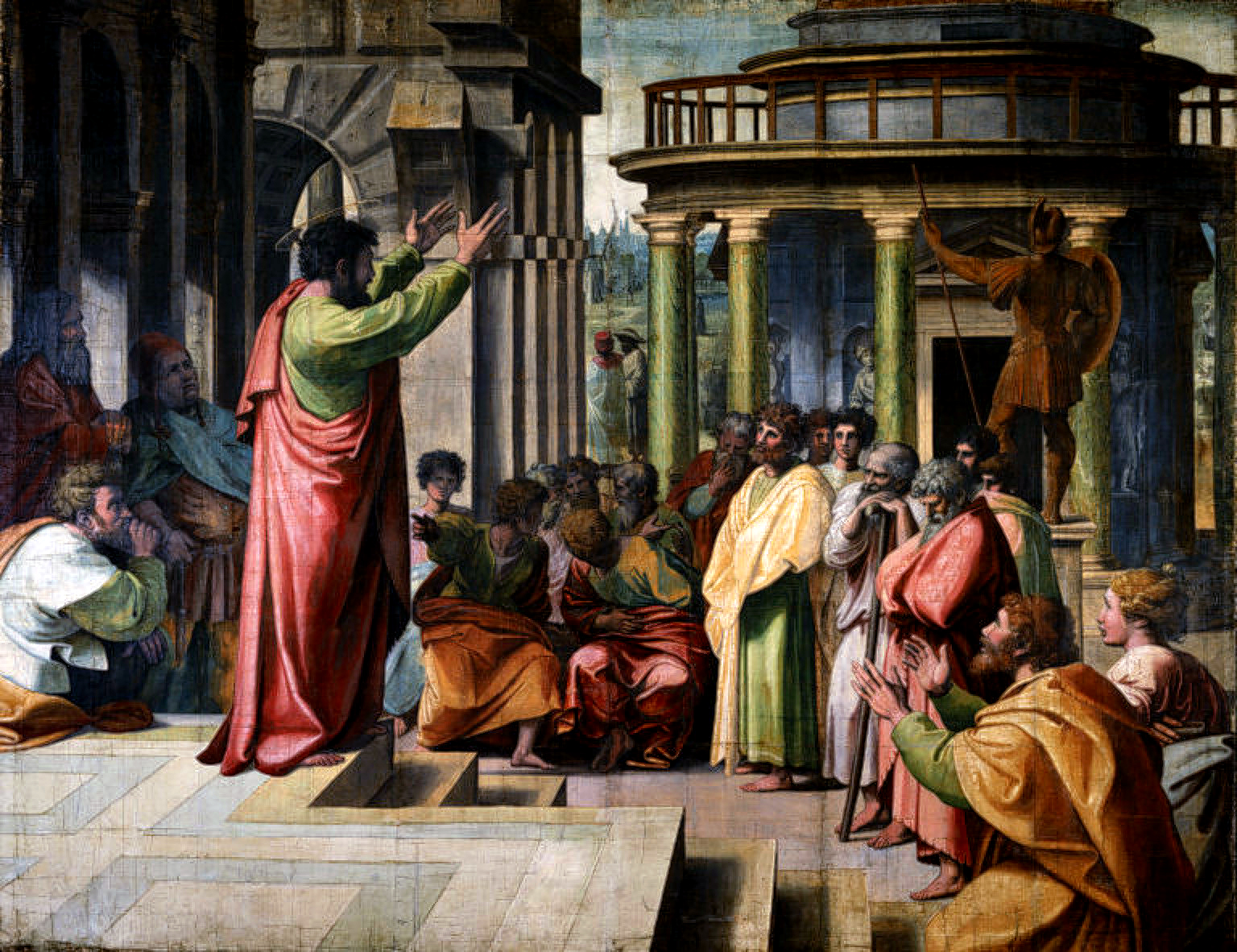
St. Paul in Athens delivering the Areopagus sermon in which he addressed early issues in Christology, depicted in a 1515 portrait by Raphael

Paul left for his second missionary journey from Jerusalem, in late Autumn 49 AD, after the meeting of the Council of Jerusalem where the circumcision question was debated. On their trip around the Mediterranean Sea, Paul and his companion Barnabas stopped in Antioch where they had a sharp argument about taking John Mark with them on their trips. The Acts of the Apostles said that John Mark had left them in a previous trip and gone home. Unable to resolve the dispute, Paul and Barnabas decided to separate; Barnabas took John Mark with him, while Silas joined Paul.

Paul and Silas initially visited Tarsus (Paul's birthplace), Derbe and Lystra. In Lystra, they met Timothy, a disciple who was spoken well of, and decided to take him with them. Paul and his companions, Silas and Timothy, had plans to journey to the southwest portion of Asia Minor to preach the gospel but during the night, Paul had a vision of a man of Macedonia standing and begging him to go to Macedonia to help them. After seeing the vision, Paul and his companions left for Macedonia to preach the gospel to them. The church kept growing, adding believers, and strengthening in faith daily.

In Philippi, Paul cast a spirit of divination out of a servant girl, whose masters were then unhappy about the loss of income her soothsaying provided. They seized Paul and Silas and dragged them into the marketplace before the authorities and Paul and Silas were put in jail. After a miraculous earthquake, the gates of the prison fell apart and Paul and Silas could have escaped but remained; this event led to the conversion of the jailor. They continued traveling, going by Berea and then to Athens, where Paul daily preached to the Jews and God-fearing Greeks in the synagogue as well as to the Agora and was taken to the court of the Areopagus where he preached to the elite including the Greek intellectuals. Paul continued from Athens to Corinth.

=== Interval in Corinth ===
Around 50–51 AD Paul arrived at Corinth and founded the Church of Corinth, he stayed there for 18 months. The reference in Acts to Proconsul Gallio helps ascertain this date (cf. Gallio Inscription). In Corinth, Paul met Priscilla and Aquila, who became faithful believers and helped Paul through his other missionary journeys. The couple followed Paul and his companions to Ephesus and stayed there to start one of the strongest and most faithful churches at that time.

In 52, departing from Corinth, Paul stopped at the nearby village of Cenchreae to have his hair cut off, because of a vow he had earlier taken. It is possible this was to be a final haircut before fulfilling his vow to become a Nazirite for a defined period of time. With Priscilla and Aquila, the missionaries then sailed to Ephesus and then Paul alone went on to Caesarea to greet the church there. He then traveled north to Antioch, where he stayed for some time (Ancient Greek: ποιήσας χρόνον τινὰ). Some New Testament texts (Note: This clause is not found in some major sources: Codex Sinaiticus, Codex Alexandrinus, Codex Vaticanus or Codex Laudianus) suggest that he also visited Jerusalem during this period for one of the Jewish feasts, possibly Pentecost. Textual critic Henry Alford and others consider the reference to a Jerusalem visit to be genuine and it accords with Acts 21:29, according to which Paul and Trophimus the Ephesian had previously been seen in Jerusalem.

=== Third missionary journey ===
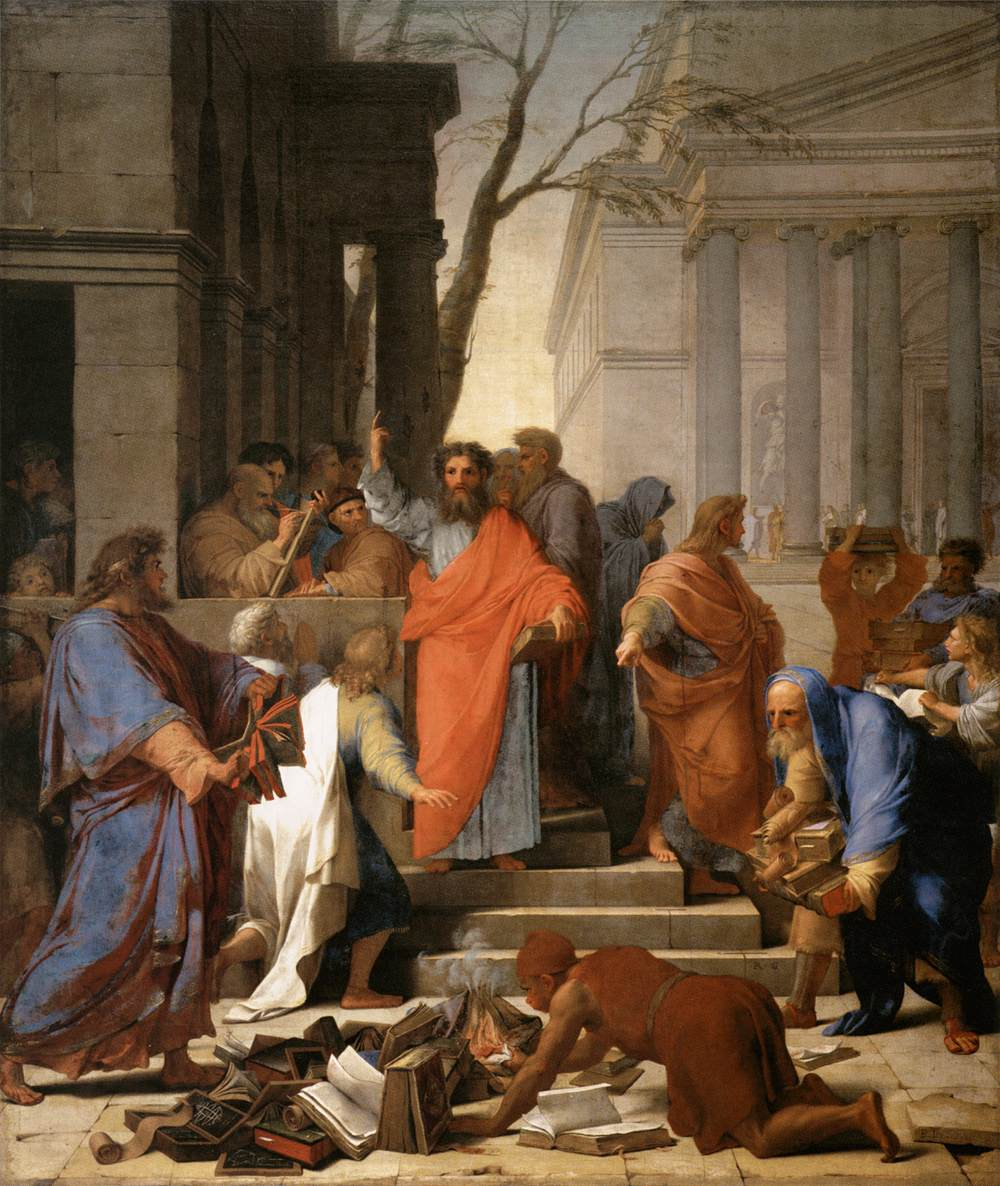
The Preaching of Saint Paul at Ephesus, a 1649 portrait by Eustache Le Sueur

According to Acts, Paul began his third missionary journey by traveling all around the region of Galatia and Phrygia to strengthen, teach and rebuke the believers. Paul then traveled to Ephesus, an important center of early Christianity, and stayed there for almost three years, probably working there as a tent maker, as he had done when he stayed in Corinth. He is said to have performed numerous miracles, healing people and casting out demons, and he apparently organized missionary activity in other regions. Paul left Ephesus after a silversmith incited a large crowd against his preaching, resulting in pro-Artemis riots that involved much of the city. During his stay in Ephesus, Paul wrote four letters to the church in Corinth. The letter to the church in Philippi is generally thought to have been written from Ephesus, though a minority view considers it may have been penned while he was imprisoned in Rome.

Paul went through Macedonia into Achaea and stayed in Greece, probably Corinth, for three months during 56–57 AD. Commentators generally agree that Paul dictated his Epistle to the Romans during this period. He then made ready to continue on to Syria, but he changed his plans and traveled back through Macedonia, putatively because certain Jews had made a plot against him. In Romans 15:19, Paul wrote that he visited Illyricum, but he may have meant what would now be called Illyria Graeca, which was at that time a division of the Roman province of Macedonia. On their way back to Jerusalem, Paul and his companions visited other cities such as Philippi, Troas, Miletus, Rhodes, and Tyre. Paul finished his trip with a stop in Caesarea, where he and his companions stayed with Philip the Evangelist before finally arriving in Jerusalem.

=== Conjectured journey from Rome to Spain ===
Among the writings of the early Christians, Pope Clement I said that Paul was "Herald (of the Gospel of Christ) in the West", and that "he had gone to the extremity of the west".

Where Lightfoot's translation has "had preached" below (in the "church tradition" section), the Hoole translation has "having become a herald". John Chrysostom indicated that Paul preached in Spain: "For after he had been in Rome, he returned to Spain, but whether he came thence again into these parts, we know not". Cyril of Jerusalem said that Paul, "fully preached the Gospel, and instructed even imperial Rome, and carried the earnestness of his preaching as far as Spain, undergoing conflicts innumerable, and performing Signs and wonders". The Muratorian fragment mentions "the departure of Paul from the city [of Rome] [5a] (39) when he journeyed to Spain".

=== Visits to Jerusalem in Acts and the epistles ===
The following table is adapted from the book From Jesus to Christianity by Biblical scholar L. Michael White, matching Paul's travels as documented in the Acts and the travels in his Epistles but not agreed upon fully by all Biblical scholars.

Acts	Epistles
First visit to Jerusalem; "after many days" of Damascus conversion; preaches openly in Jerusalem with Barnabas; meets apostles	First visit to Jerusalem; three years after Damascus conversion; sees only Cephas (Simon Peter) and James
Second visit to Jerusalem; for famine relief	There is debate over whether Paul's visit in Galatians 2 refers to the visit for famine relief or the Jerusalem Council. If it refers to the former, then this was the trip made "after an interval of fourteen years".
Third visit to Jerusalem; with Barnabas; "Council of Jerusalem"; followed by confrontation with Barnabas in Antioch	Another (Note: Paul does not exactly say that this was his second visit. In Galatians, he lists three important meetings with Peter, and this was the second on his list. The third meeting took place in Antioch. He does not explicitly state that he did not visit Jerusalem in between this and his first visit.) visit to Jerusalem; 14 years later (after Damascus conversion?); with Barnabas and Titus; possibly the "Council of Jerusalem"; Paul agrees to "remember the poor"; followed by confrontation with Peter and Barnabas in Antioch
Fourth visit to Jerusalem; to "greet the church"	Apparently unmentioned.
Fifth visit to Jerusalem; after an absence of several years; to bring gifts for the poor and to present offerings; Paul arrested	Another (Note: Note that Paul only writes that he is on his way to Jerusalem, or just planning the visit. There might or might not have been additional visits before or after this visit, if he ever got to Jerusalem.) visit to Jerusalem.; to deliver the collection for the poor

=== Last visit to Jerusalem and arrest ===
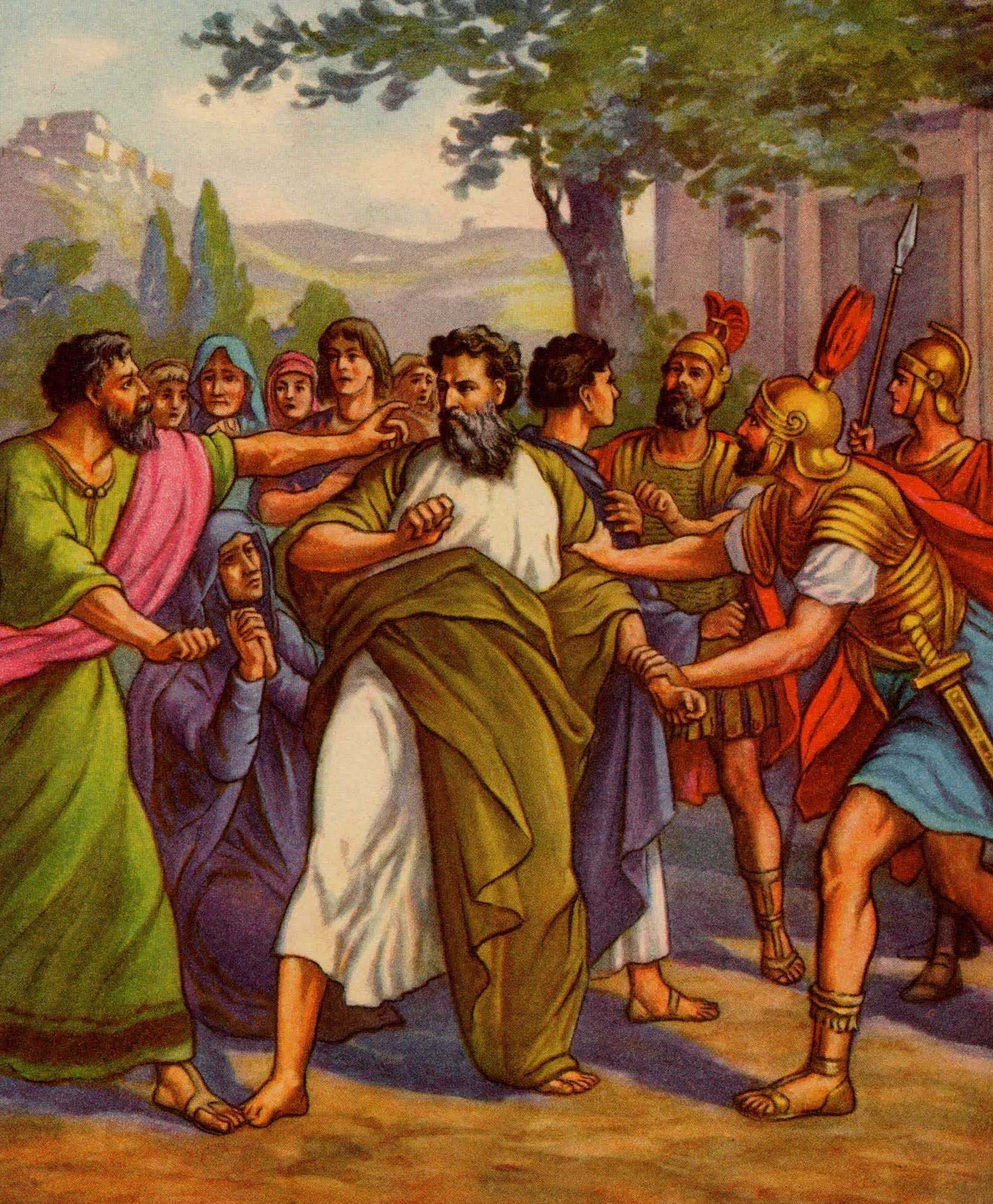
St. Paul's arrest depicted in an early 1900s Bible illustration

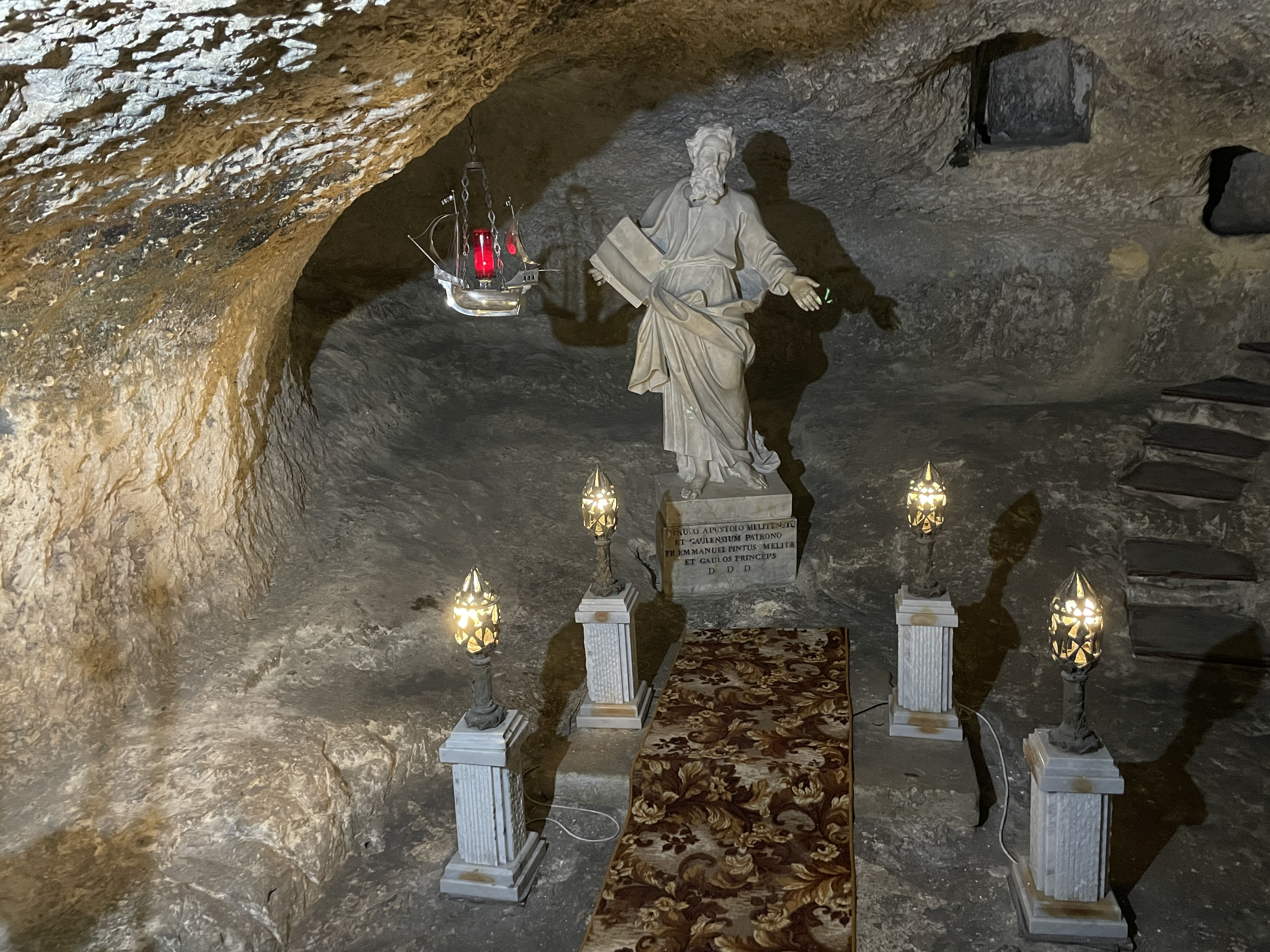
St. Paul's grotto in Rabat, Malta

In 57 AD, upon completion of his third missionary journey, Paul arrived in Jerusalem for his fifth and final visit with a collection of money for the local community. The Acts of the Apostles reports that initially he was warmly received. However, Acts goes on to recount how Paul was warned by James and the elders that he was gaining a reputation for being against the Law, saying, "they have been told about you that you teach all the Jews living among the Gentiles to forsake Moses, and that you tell them not to circumcise their children or observe the customs." Paul underwent a purification ritual so that "all will know that there is nothing in what they have been told about you, but that you yourself observe and guard the law."

When the seven days of the purification ritual were almost completed, some "Jews from Asia" (most likely from Roman Asia) accused Paul of defiling the temple by bringing gentiles into it. He was seized and dragged out of the temple by an angry mob. When the tribune heard of the uproar, he and some centurions and soldiers rushed to the area. Unable to determine his identity and the cause of the uproar, they placed him in chains. He was about to be taken into the barracks when he asked to speak to the people. He was given permission by the Romans and proceeded to tell his story. After a while, the crowd responded. "Up to this point they listened to him, but then they shouted, 'Away with such a fellow from the earth! For he should not be allowed to live.'" The tribune ordered that Paul be brought into the barracks and interrogated under flogging. Paul asserted his Roman citizenship, which would prevent his flogging. The tribune "wanted to find out what Paul was being accused of by the angry Jerusalemites, the next day he released him and ordered the chief priests and the entire council to meet". Paul spoke before the council and caused a disagreement between the Pharisees and the Sadducees. When this threatened to turn violent, the tribune ordered his soldiers to take Paul by force and return him to the barracks.

The next morning, 40 Jews "bound themselves by an oath neither to eat nor drink until they had killed Paul", but the son of Paul's sister heard of the plot and notified Paul, who notified the tribune that the conspiracists were going to ambush him. The tribune ordered two centurions to "Get ready to leave by nine o'clock tonight for Caesarea with two hundred soldiers, seventy horsemen, and two hundred spearmen. Also provide mounts for Paul to ride, and take him safely to Felix the governor."

Paul was taken to Caesarea, where the governor ordered that he be kept under guard in Herod's headquarters. "Five days later the high priest Ananias came down with some elders and an attorney, a certain Tertullus, and they reported their case against Paul to the governor." Both Paul and the Jewish authorities gave a statement "But Felix, who was rather well informed about the Way, adjourned the hearing with the comment, "When Lysias the tribune comes down, I will decide your case." Tradition identifies a vaulted cellar near the ruins of Caesaria's Crusader cathedral as the location of Paul's imprisonment.

Marcus Antonius Felix then ordered the centurion to keep Paul in custody, but to "let him have some liberty and not to prevent any of his friends from taking care of his needs." He was held there for two years by Felix, until a new governor, Porcius Festus, was appointed. The "chief priests and the leaders of the Jews" requested that Festus return Paul to Jerusalem. After Festus had stayed in Jerusalem "not more than eight or ten days, he went down to Caesarea; the next day he took his seat on the tribunal and ordered Paul to be brought." When Festus suggested that he be sent back to Jerusalem for further trial, Paul exercised his right as a Roman citizen to "appeal unto Caesar". Finally, Paul and his companions sailed for Rome where Paul was to stand trial for his alleged crimes.

Acts recounts that on the way to Rome for his appeal as a Roman citizen to Caesar, Paul was shipwrecked on Melita, which is present-day Malta, where the islanders showed him "unusual kindness." Paul's traveling companion and author of Acts of the Apostles, Luke, recorded that the islanders "built a fire and welcomed us all because it was raining and cold. Paul gathered a pile of brushwood and, as he put it on the fire, a poisonous snake, driven out by the heat, fastened itself on his hand. When the islanders saw the snake hanging from his hand, they said to each other, 'This man must be a murderer; for though he escaped from the sea, the goddess Justice has not allowed him to live.'" But Paul shook the snake off into the fire and suffered no ill effects." After this, Paul was met by Publius. From Malta, he travelled to Rome via Syracuse, Rhegium, and Puteoli.

=== Two years in Rome ===
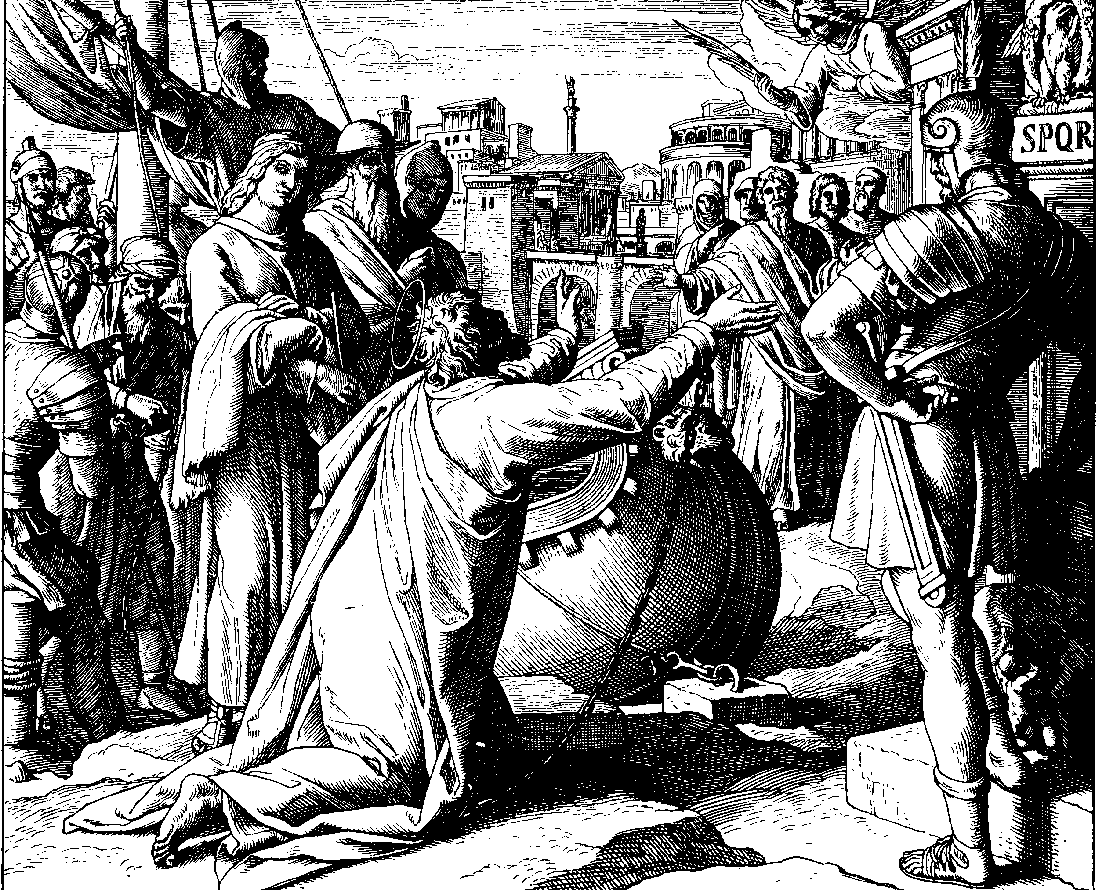
Paul Arrives in Rome from Die Bibel in Bildern, published in the 1850s

Paul finally arrived in Rome c. 60 AD, where he spent another two years under house arrest, according to the traditional account. The narrative of Acts ends with Paul preaching in Rome for two years from his rented home while awaiting trial.

Irenaeus wrote in the 2nd century that Peter and Paul had been the founders of the church in Rome and had appointed Linus as succeeding bishop. However, Acts makes no mention of Paul being a bishop of Rome. Paul only played a supporting part in the life of the church in Rome.

=== Death ===
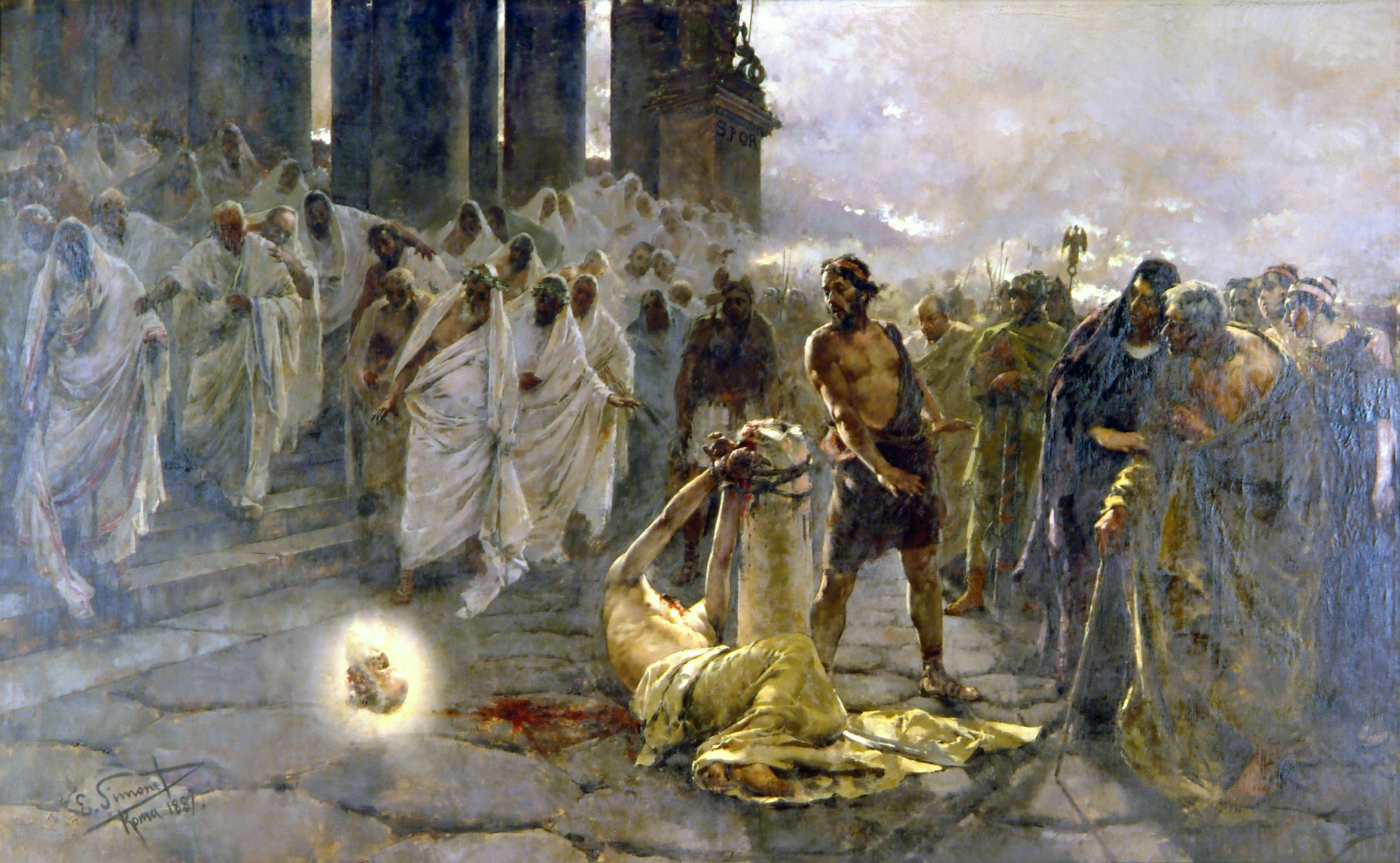
The Beheading of Saint Paul, an 1887 portrait by Enrique Simonet

Paul's death is believed to have occurred after the Great Fire of Rome in July 64 AD, but before the last year of Nero's reign, in 68 AD. Acts 28 concludes with Paul's living and preaching in Rome but does not mention his death. Eric Franklin sees this as the author's "omission", comparable to his emphasis on Stephen's preaching, rather than his death, in Acts 7.

Clement of Rome writes in his Epistle to the Corinthians that after Paul "had borne his testimony before the rulers", he "departed from the world and went unto the holy place, having been found a notable pattern of patient endurance." Ignatius of Antioch writes in his Epistle to the Ephesians that Paul was "martyred", without giving any further information. Tertullian writes that Paul was "crowned with an exit like John" (Paulus Ioannis exitu coronatur), although it is unclear which John he meant.

Eusebius states that Paul was killed during the Neronian Persecution and, quoting from Dionysius of Corinth, argues that Peter and Paul were martyred "at the same time". This is also reported by Sulpicius Severus, who claimed Peter was crucified while Paul was beheaded. John Chrysostom provides an account of Nero's imprisoning Paul, but not of his execution, and no mention of Peter. Lactantius only mentioned '[It was Nero] who first persecuted the servants of God; he crucified Peter, and slew Paul' (Paulum interfecit).

Based on the letters attributed to Paul, Jerome claims Paul was imprisoned by Nero in 'the twenty-fifth year after our Lord's passion' (post passionem Domini vicesimo quinto anno), 'that is the second of Nero' (id est, secundo Neronis), 'at the time when Festus Procurator of Judea succeeded Felix, he was sent bound to Rome, (...) remaining for two years in free custody'. Jerome interpreted the Second Epistle to Timothy to indicate that 'Paul was dismissed by Nero' (Paulum a Nerone dimissum) 'that the gospel of Christ might be preached also in the West'; but 'in the fourteenth year of Nero' (quarto decimo Neronis anno) 'on the same day with Peter, [Paul] was beheaded at Rome for Christ's sake and was buried in the Via Ostiensis, the thirty-seventh year after our Lord's passion' (anno post passionem Domini tricesimo septimo).

A legend later developed that his martyrdom occurred at the Aquae Salviae, on the Via Laurentina. According to this legend, after Paul was decapitated, his severed head bounced three times, giving rise to a source of water each time that it touched the ground, which is how the place earned the name "San Paolo alle Tre Fontane" ("St Paul at the Three Fountains"). The apocryphal Acts of Paul also describe the martyrdom and the burial of Paul.

== Remains ==
According to the Liber Pontificalis, Paul's body was buried outside the walls of Rome, at the second mile on the Via Ostiensis, on the estate owned by a Christian woman named Lucina. It was here, in the fourth century, that the Emperor Constantine the Great built a first church. Then, between the fourth and fifth centuries, it was considerably enlarged by the Emperors Valentinian I, Valentinian II, Theodosius I, and Arcadius. The present-day Basilica of Saint Paul Outside the Walls was built there in the early 19th century.

Caius in his Disputation Against Proclus (198 AD) mentions this of the places in which the remains of the apostles Peter and Paul were deposited: "I can point out the trophies of the apostles. For if you are willing to go to the Vatican or to the Ostian Way, you will find the trophies of those who founded this Church".

Writing on Paul's biography, Jerome in his De Viris Illustribus in 392 AD mentions that "Paul was buried in the Ostian Way at Rome".

In 2002, an 8-foot (2.4 m)-long marble sarcophagus, inscribed with the words "PAULO APOSTOLO MART", which translates as "Paul apostle martyr", was discovered during excavations around the Basilica of Saint Paul Outside the Walls on the Via Ostiensis. Vatican archaeologists declared this to be the tomb of Paul the Apostle in December 2006, the excavation having been completed in November. In the early 2000s, Vatican archaeologists conducted excavations to make the tomb more accessible to pilgrims. These excavations confirmed the presence of a white marble sarcophagus beneath the altar. The sarcophagus was not removed, but a window was created to allow visitors to view it.

In 2009, Pope Benedict XVI announced that radiocarbon dating of bone fragments found in the sarcophagus indicated they were from the 1st or 2nd century, aligning with the traditional timeline of Paul's life. The Pope argued that this discovery, along with other artifacts such as a piece of purple linen laminated with pure gold, grains of incense, and blue textiles with linen filaments, all support the hypothesis that the remains are indeed those of Saint Paul. However, Ulderico Santamaria, the head of the Vatican Museums' diagnostics laboratory and a Professor with expertise in Analytical Chemistry and Materials Engineering at Tuscia University, urged caution, noting that the dating neither confirms nor invalidates the relics' traditional assignment to St. Paul.

The Vatican also confirmed that it had discovered and restored the earliest known image of Saint Paul, dating to the early 4th century AD, in the Catacomb of Saint Thekla, close to the Basilica of St Paul Outside the Walls in Rome. In 2010 it was revealed that this icon, painted on the ceiling of a catacomb, was adjacent to the oldest known depictions of Saint Peter, Saint John, and Saint Andrew, surrounding an image of Christ as the Good Shepherd.

== Church tradition ==
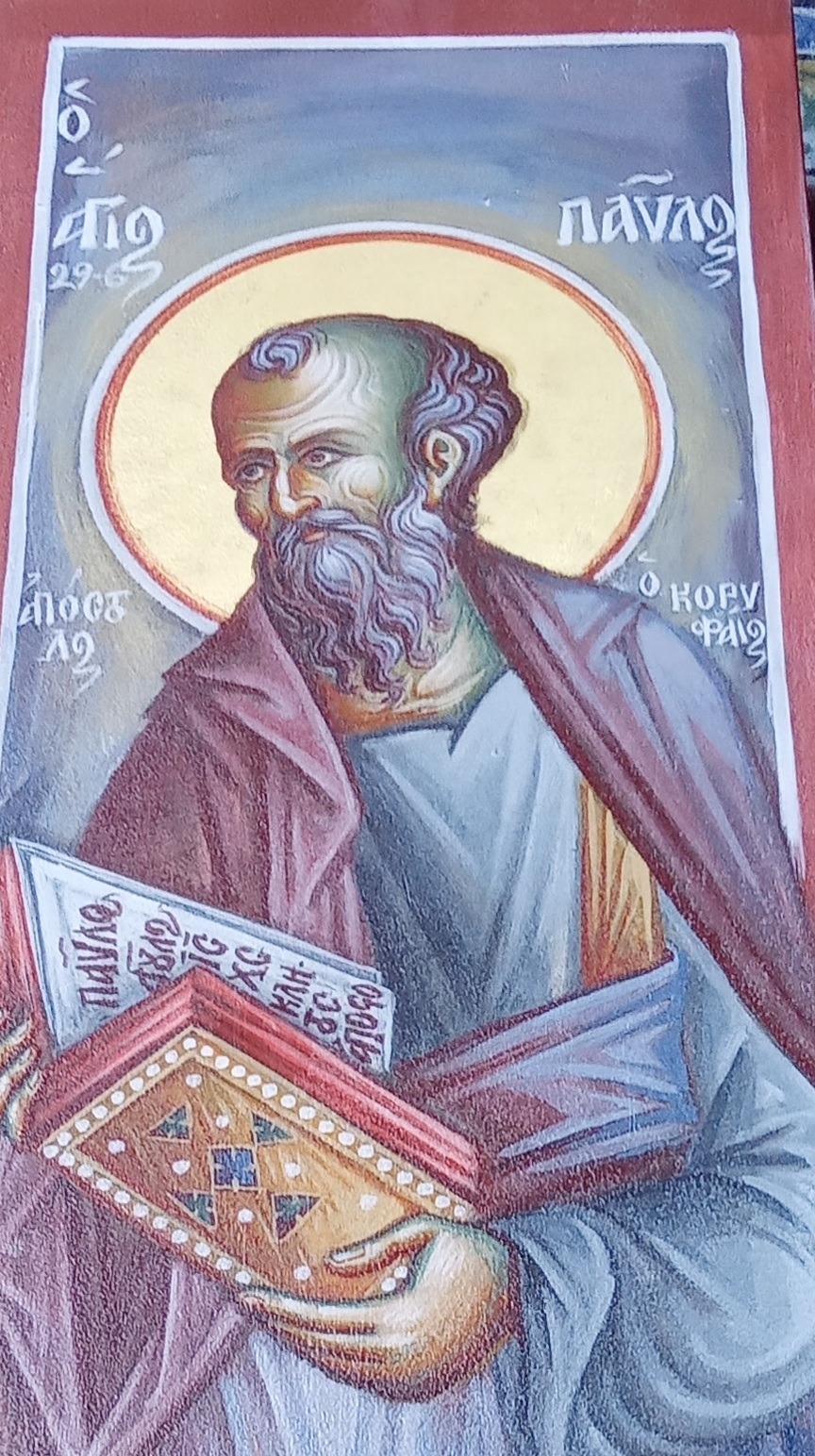
A Greek Orthodox mural painting of St. Paul

Various Christian writers have suggested more details about Paul's life:

1 Clement, a letter written by the Roman bishop Clement of Rome around the year 90, reports this about Paul:

By reason of jealousy and strife Paul by his example pointed out the prize of patient endurance. After that he had been seven times in bonds, had been driven into exile, had been stoned, had preached in the East and in the West, he won the noble renown which was the reward of his faith, having taught righteousness unto the whole world and having reached the farthest bounds of the West; and when he had borne his testimony before the rulers, so he departed from the world and went unto the holy place, having been found a notable pattern of patient endurance.

— Lightfoot 1890, p. 274, The First Epistle of Clement to the Corinthians, 5:5–6

Commenting on this passage, Raymond Brown writes that while it "does not explicitly say" that Paul was martyred in Rome, "such a martyrdom is the most reasonable interpretation". Eusebius of Caesarea, who wrote in the 4th century, states that Paul was beheaded in the reign of the Roman Emperor Nero. This event has been dated either to the year 64 AD, when Rome was devastated by a fire, or a few years later, to 67 AD. According to one tradition, the church of San Paolo alle Tre Fontane marks the place of Paul's execution. A Roman Catholic liturgical solemnity of Peter and Paul, celebrated on 29 June, commemorates his martyrdom, and reflects a tradition (preserved by Eusebius) that Peter and Paul were martyred at the same time. The Roman liturgical calendar for the following day now remembers all Christians martyred in these early persecutions; formerly, 30 June was the feast day for St. Paul. Persons or religious orders with a special affinity for St. Paul can still celebrate their patron on 30 June.

The apocryphal Acts of Paul and the apocryphal Acts of Peter suggest that Paul survived Rome and traveled further west. Some think that Paul could have revisited Greece and Asia Minor after his trip to Spain, and might then have been arrested in Troas, and taken to Rome and executed. A tradition holds that Paul was interred with Saint Peter ad Catacumbas by the via Appia until moved to what is now the Basilica of Saint Paul Outside the Walls in Rome. Bede, in his Ecclesiastical History, writes that Pope Vitalian in 665 gave Paul's relics (including a cross made from his prison chains) from the crypts of Lucina to King Oswy of Northumbria, northern Britain. The skull of Saint Paul is claimed to reside in the Archbasilica of Saint John Lateran since at least the ninth century, alongside the skull of Saint Peter.

The Feast of the Conversion of Saint Paul is celebrated on 25 January.

== Feast days ==
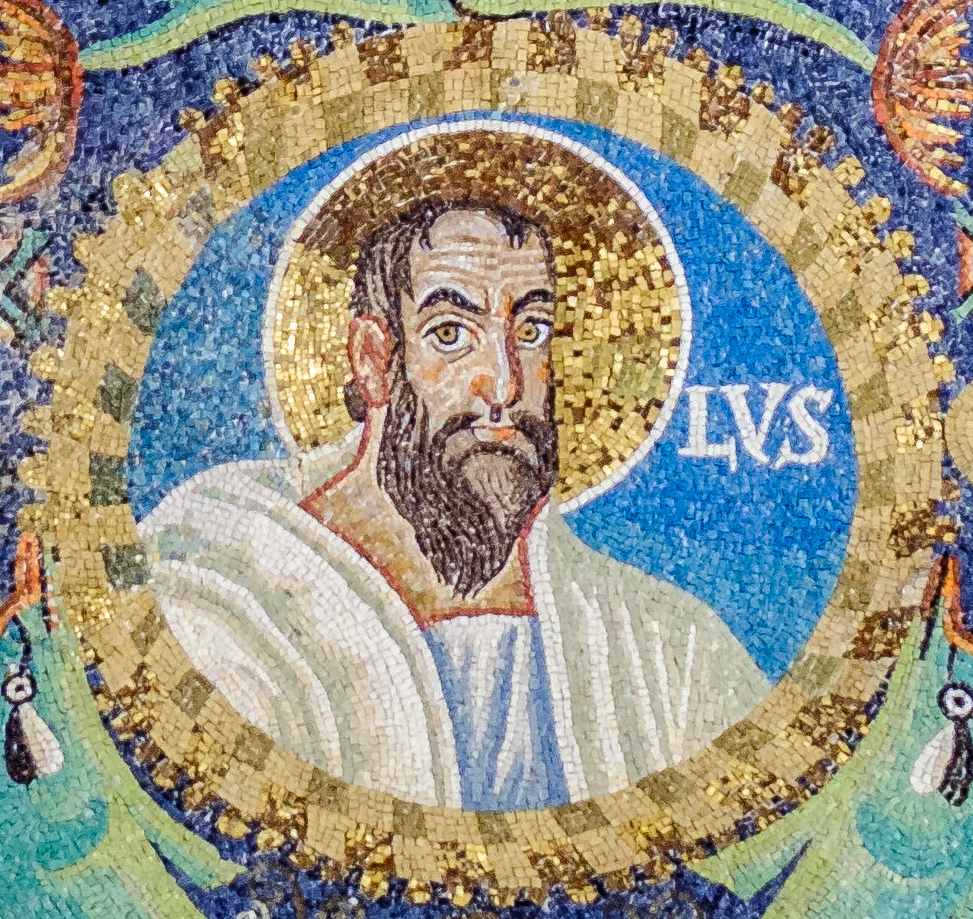
Paul the Apostle, detail of the mosaic in the Basilica of San Vitale, Ravenna, 6th century

=== Roman Catholicism ===
The Roman Martyrology commemorates Paul with a feast celebrating his conversion on 25 January. The Roman Martyrology also commemorates Paul and Peter with a solemnity on 29 June.

=== Eastern Orthodoxy ===
The Eastern Orthodox Church has several fixed days for the commemoration of Paul:

- 7 March – The Synaxis of the Saints of the Dodecanese Islands.
- 29 June – The Apostles Peter and Paul.
- 30 June – The Twelve Apostles.
- 12 October – The Synaxis of the Saints of Athens.

The Eastern Orthodox Church also has numerous non-fixed days for the veneration of Paul:

- 21 Days before Pascha – Synaxis of the Saints of Rhodes.
- 21 Days after Pascha – Synaxis of the Saints of Euboea.
- First Sunday of May – Synaxis of the Saints of Gortyna and Arkadia in the island of Crete.
- The Sunday between 16 and 22 August – Synaxis of the Saints of Lefkada.

=== The Church of England ===
The Church of England celebrates the Conversion of Saint Paul on 25 January as a Festival. Furthermore, along with Saint Peter, Paul is remembered by the Church of England with a Festival on 29 June.

=== Lutheran Church ===
Both the Evangelical Lutheran Church in America and the Lutheran Church-Missouri Synod have two festivals for Saint Paul, the first being his conversion on 25 January, and the second being for Saints Peter and Paul on 29 June.

=== Patronage ===
Paul is the patron saint of several locations. He is the patron saint of the island of Malta, which celebrates Paul's arrival to the island via shipwreck on 10 February. This day is a public holiday on the island. Paul is also considered to be the patron saint of the city of London.

== Physical appearance ==
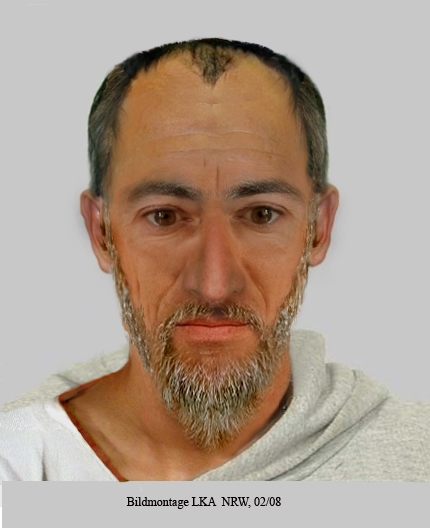
A facial composite of St. Paul created by experts of the Landeskriminalamt of North Rhine-Westphalia using historical sources

The New Testament offers little if any information about the physical appearance of Paul, but several descriptions can be found in apocryphal texts. In the Acts of Paul he is described as "A man of small stature, with a bald head and crooked legs, in a good state of body, with eyebrows meeting and nose somewhat hooked". In the Latin version of the Acts of Paul and Thecla it is added that he had a red, florid face.

In The History of the Contending of Saint Paul, his countenance is described as "ruddy with the ruddiness of the skin of the pomegranate". The Acts of Saint Peter confirms that Paul had a bald and shining head, with red hair. As summarised by Barnes, Chrysostom records that Paul's stature was low, his body crooked and his head bald. Paul is described in Philopatris, a dialogue formerly attributed to Lucian but now generally admitted to be spurious, as "corpore erat parvo, contracto, incurvo, tricubitali" ("he was small, contracted, crooked, of three cubits, or four feet six").

Nicephorus claims that Paul was a little man, crooked, and almost bent like a bow, with a pale countenance, long and wrinkled, and a bald head. Pseudo-Chrysostom echoes Lucian's height of Paul, referring to him as "the man of three cubits".

== Writings ==
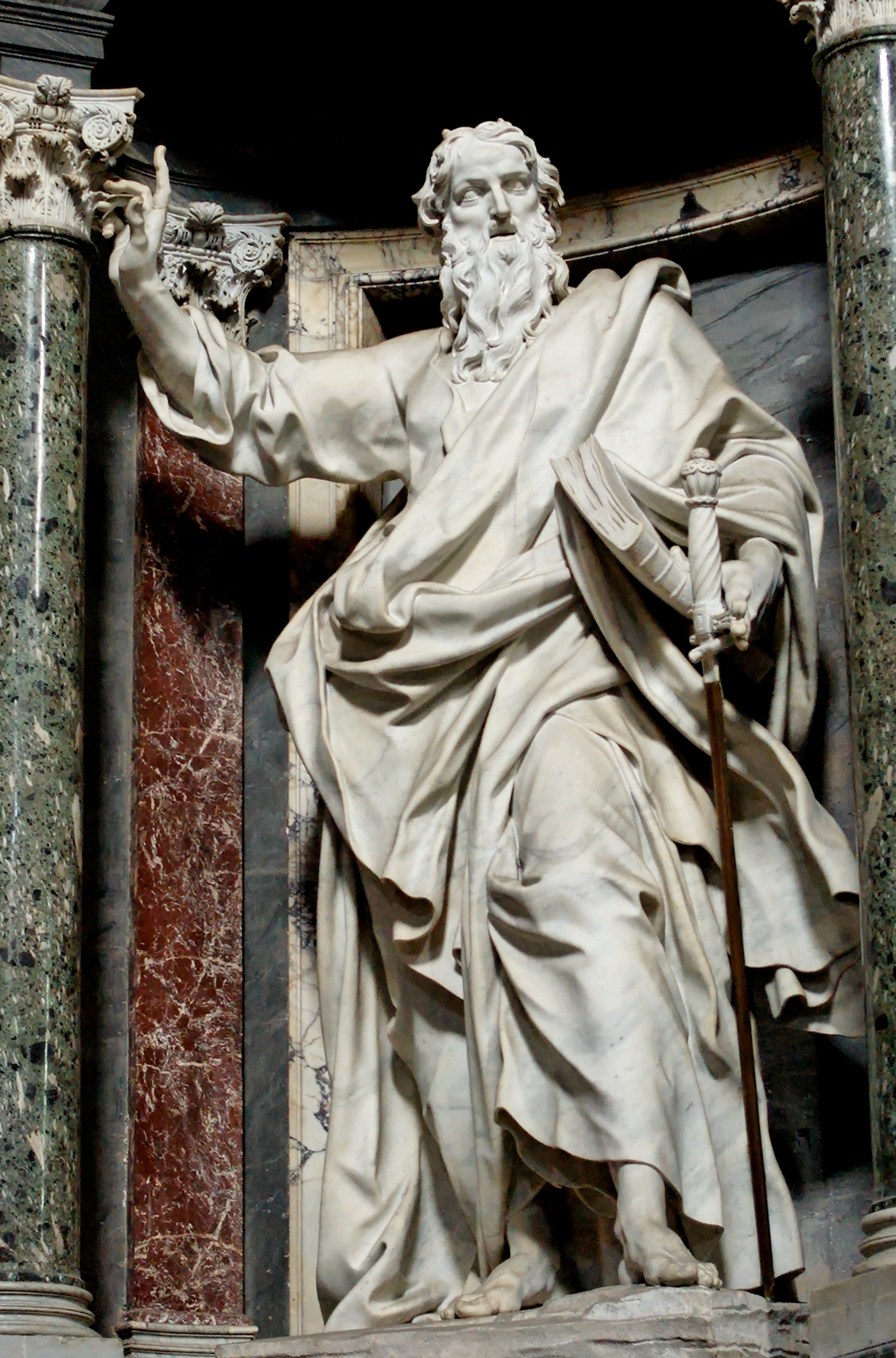
A statue of St. Paul in the Archbasilica of Saint John Lateran by Pierre-Étienne Monnot

Of the 27 books in the New Testament, 13 identify Paul as the author; seven of these are widely considered authentic and Paul's own, while the authorship of the other six is disputed. The undisputed letters are considered the most important sources since they contain what is widely agreed to be Paul's own statements about his life and thoughts. Theologian Mark Powell writes that Paul directed these seven letters to specific occasions at particular churches. As an example, if the Corinthian church had not experienced problems concerning its celebration of the Lord's Supper, today it would not be known that Paul even believed in that observance or had any opinions about it one way or the other. Powell comments that there may be other matters in the early church that have since gone unnoticed simply because no crises arose that prompted Paul to comment on them.

In Paul's writings, he provides the first written account of what it is to be a Christian and thus a description of Christian spirituality. His letters have been characterized as being the most influential books of the New Testament after the Gospels of Matthew and John. (Note: Sanders 2019: "Paul [...] only occasionally had the opportunity to revisit his churches. He tried to keep up his converts' spirit, answer their questions, and resolve their problems by letter and by sending one or more of his assistants, especially Timothy and Titus. Paul's letters reveal a remarkable human being: dedicated, compassionate, emotional, sometimes harsh and angry, clever and quick-witted, supple in argumentation, and above all possessing a soaring, passionate commitment to God, Jesus Christ, and his own mission. Fortunately, after his death one of his followers collected some of the letters, edited them very slightly, and published them. They constitute one of history's most remarkable personal contributions to religious thought and practice.)

=== Date ===
Paul's authentic letters are roughly dated to the years surrounding the mid-1st century. Placing Paul in this time period is done on the basis of his reported conflicts with other early contemporary figures in the Jesus movement including James and Peter, the references to Paul and his letters by Clement of Rome writing in the late 1st century, his reported issues in Damascus from 2 Corinthians 11:32 which he says took place while King Aretas IV was in power, a possible reference to Erastus of Corinth in Romans 16:23, his reference to preaching in the region of Illyricum (which had been reorganized by AD 10 into the provinces of Dalmatia and Pannonia), the lack of any references to the Gospels indicating a pre-war time period, the chronology in the Acts of the Apostles placing Paul in this time, and the dependence on Paul's letters by other 1st-century pseudo-Pauline epistles.

=== Authorship ===
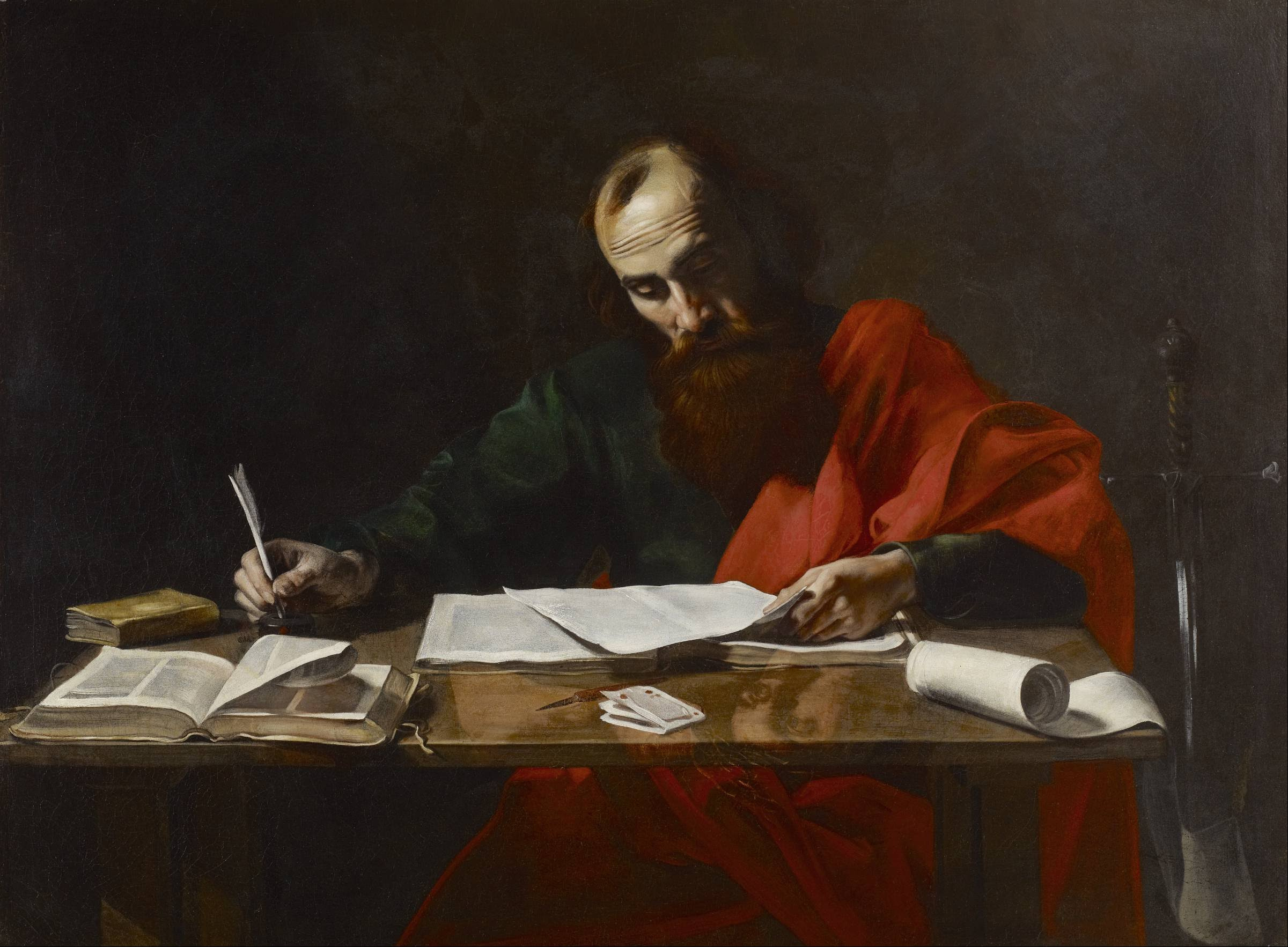
Paul Writing His Epistles, a 17th century portrait by Valentin de Boulogne

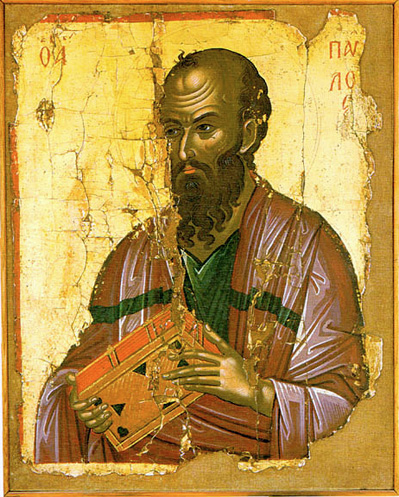
Eastern Orthodox icon of Apostle Paul by Theophanes the Cretan, 1546

Seven of the 13 letters that bear Paul's name, Romans, 1 Corinthians, 2 Corinthians, Galatians, Philippians, 1 Thessalonians and Philemon, are almost universally accepted as being entirely authentic and dictated by Paul himself. They are considered the best source of information on Paul's life and especially his thought.

Four of the letters (Ephesians, 1 and 2 Timothy and Titus) are widely considered pseudepigraphical, while the authorship of the other two is subject to debate. Colossians and 2 Thessalonians are possibly "Deutero-Pauline" meaning they may have been written by Paul's followers after his death. Similarly, 1 Timothy, 2 Timothy, and Titus may be "Trito-Pauline" meaning they may have been written by members of the Pauline school a generation after his death. According to their theories, these disputed letters may have come from followers writing in Paul's name, often using material from his surviving letters. These scribes also may have had access to letters written by Paul that no longer survive.

The authenticity of Colossians has been questioned on the grounds that it contains an otherwise unparalleled description (among his writings) of Jesus as "the image of the invisible God", a Christology found elsewhere only in the Gospel of John.

=== Acts ===
Although approximately half of the Acts of the Apostles deals with Paul's life and works, Acts does not refer to Paul writing letters. Charles Williams believes that the author of Acts did not have access to any of Paul's letters. He claims that one piece of evidence suggesting this is that Acts never directly quotes from the Pauline epistles. Further, discrepancies between the Pauline epistles and Acts could also support this conclusion. The scholarly consensus was indeed that the author of Acts did not know the Pauline epistles, but such consensus got superseded.

British Jewish scholar Hyam Maccoby contended that Paul, as described in the Acts of the Apostles, is quite different from the view of Paul gleaned from his own writings. Some difficulties have been noted in the account of his life. Paul as described in the Acts of the Apostles is much more interested in factual history, less in theology; ideas such as justification by faith are absent as are references to the Spirit, according to Maccoby. He also pointed out that there are no references to John the Baptist in the Pauline Epistles, although Paul mentions him several times in the Acts of the Apostles.

Others have objected that the language of the speeches is too Lukan in style to reflect anyone else's words. Moreover, George Shillington writes that the author of Acts most likely created the speeches accordingly and they bear his literary and theological marks. Conversely, Howard Marshall writes that the speeches were not entirely the inventions of the author and while they may not be accurate word-for-word, the author nevertheless records the general idea of them.

F. C. Baur (1792–1860), professor of theology at Tübingen in Germany, the first scholar to critique Acts and the Pauline Epistles, and founder of the Tübingen School of theology, argued that Paul, as the "Apostle to the Gentiles", was in violent opposition to the original 12 Apostles. Baur considers the Acts of the Apostles were late and unreliable. This debate has continued ever since, with Adolf Deissmann (1866–1937) and Richard Reitzenstein (1861–1931) emphasising Paul's Greek inheritance and Albert Schweitzer stressing his dependence on Judaism.

== Views ==
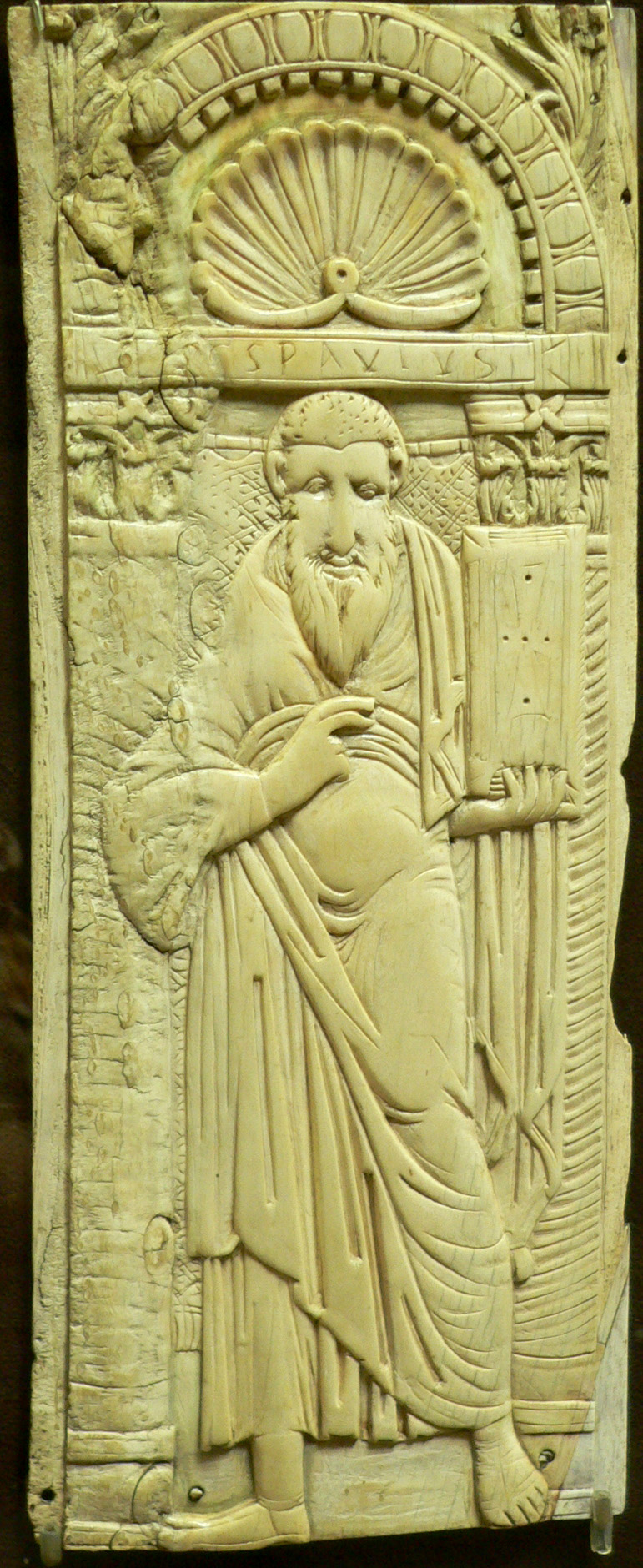
Byzantine ivory relief, 6th – early 7th century by Musée de Cluny

=== Self-view ===
In the opening verses of Romans 1, Paul provides a litany of his own apostolic appointment to preach among the Gentiles and his post-conversion convictions about the risen Christ. Paul described himself as set apart for the gospel of God and called to be an apostle and a servant of Jesus Christ. Jesus had revealed himself to Paul, just as he had appeared to Peter, to James, and to the twelve disciples after his resurrection. Paul experienced this as an unforeseen, sudden, startling change, due to all-powerful grace, not as the fruit of his reasoning or thoughts.

Paul also describes himself as afflicted with "a thorn in the flesh"; the nature of this "thorn" is unknown.

There are debates as to whether Paul understood himself as commissioned to take the gospel to the gentiles at the moment of his conversion. Before his conversion he believed his persecution of the church to be an indication of his zeal for his religion; after his conversion he believed Jewish hostility toward the church was sinful opposition, that would incur God's wrath. Paul believed he was halted by Christ, when his fury was at its height. It was "through zeal" that he persecuted the Christian Church, and he obtained mercy because he had "acted ignorantly in unbelief".

=== Understanding of Jesus Christ ===
Throughout his letters, Paul shows awareness of biographical information about the life and teachings of Jesus. Paul's writings emphasized the crucifixion, Christ's resurrection, and his Second coming. Paul saw Jesus as Lord (kyrios), the messiah and the Son of God, who was promised by God's prophets in the Scriptures. While being a biological descendant from David ("according to the flesh"), he was declared to be the Son of God by his resurrection from the dead.

According to E. P. Sanders, Paul "preached the death, resurrection, and lordship of Jesus Christ, and he proclaimed that faith in Jesus guarantees a share in his life." In Paul's view, "Jesus' death was not a defeat but was for the believers' benefit", a sacrifice which substitutes for the lives of others, and frees them from the bondage of sin. Believers participate in Christ's death and resurrection by their baptism. The resurrection of Jesus was of primary importance to Paul, bringing the promise of salvation to believers. Paul taught that when Christ returned, the dead would be raised, while the living would be "caught up in the clouds together with them to meet the Lord in the air".

Sanders concludes that Paul's writings reveal the essence of the Christian message: (1) God sent his Son; (2) the Son was crucified and resurrected for the benefit of humanity; (3) the Son would return; and (4) those who belonged to the Son would live with him forever. Paul's gospel also included (5) the admonition to live by the highest moral standard: "May your spirit and soul and body be kept sound and blameless at the coming of our Lord Jesus Christ"."

In Paul's writings, the corporate devotional patterns towards Jesus in the early Christian community are reflective of Paul's perspective on the divine status of Jesus in a "binitarian" pattern of devotion. For Paul, Jesus receives prayer, the presence of Jesus is confessionally invoked by believers, people are baptized in Jesus' name, Jesus is the reference in Christian fellowship for a religious ritual meal (the Lord's Supper; in pagan cults, the reference for ritual meals is always to a deity), and Jesus is the source of continuing prophetic oracles to believers. While the apostle had to debate various issues such as circumcision and spiritual gifts, Paul's exalted Christology was taken for granted and widely accepted in the early church.

=== Atonement ===
Paul taught that Christians are redeemed from sin by Jesus' death and resurrection. His death was an expiation as well as a propitiation, and by Christ's blood peace is made between God and man. By grace, through faith, a Christian shares in Jesus' death and in his victory over death, gaining as a free gift a new, justified status of sonship.

According to Krister Stendahl, the main concern of Paul's writings on Jesus' role, and salvation by faith, is not the individual conscience of human sinners, and their doubts about being chosen by God or not, but the problem of the inclusion of gentile (Greek) Torah observers into God's covenant. (Note: Dunn 1982, p. n.49 quotes Stendahl 1976, p. 2 "... a doctrine of faith was hammered out by Paul for the very specific and limited purpose of defending the rights of Gentile converts to be full and genuine heirs to the promise of God to Israel" Westerholm 2015, pp. 4–15: "For Paul, the question that 'justification by faith' was intended to answer was, 'On what terms can Gentiles gain entrance to the people of God?" Bent on denying any suggestion that Gentiles must become Jews and keep the Jewish law, he answered, 'By faith—and not by works of the (Jewish) law.'" Westerholm refers to: Stendahl 1963 Westerholm quotes Sanders: "Sanders noted that 'the salvation of the Gentiles is essential to Paul's preaching; and with it falls the law; for, as Paul says simply, Gentiles cannot live by the law'. (496). On a similar note, Sanders suggested that the only Jewish 'boasting' to which Paul objected was that which exulted over the divine privileges granted to Israel and failed to acknowledge that God, in Christ, had opened the door of salvation to Gentiles.") "Dying for our sins" refers to the problem of gentile Torah-observers, who, despite their faithfulness, cannot fully observe commandments, including circumcision, and are therefore 'sinners', excluded from God's covenant. Jesus' death and resurrection solved this problem of the exclusion of the gentiles from God's covenant, as indicated by Romans 3:21–26.

Paul's conversion fundamentally changed his basic beliefs regarding God's covenant and the inclusion of Gentiles into this covenant. Paul believed Jesus' death was a voluntary sacrifice, that reconciled sinners with God. The law only reveals the extent of people's enslavement to the power of sin—a power that must be broken by Christ. Before his conversion Paul believed Gentiles were outside the covenant that God made with Israel; after his conversion, he believed Gentiles and Jews were united as the people of God in Christ. Before his conversion he believed circumcision was the rite through which males became part of Israel, an exclusive community of God's chosen people; after his conversion he believed that neither circumcision nor uncircumcision means anything, but that the new creation is what counts in the sight of God, and that this new creation is a work of Christ in the life of believers, making them part of the church, an inclusive community of Jews and Gentiles reconciled with God through faith.

According to E. P. Sanders, who initiated the New Perspective on Paul with his 1977 publication Paul and Palestinian Judaism, Paul saw the faithful redeemed by participation in Jesus' death and rising. Though "Jesus' death substituted for that of others and thereby freed believers from sin and guilt", a metaphor derived from "ancient sacrificial theology", (Note: According to the Jewish Encyclopedia (1906), "The Mishnah says that sins are expiated (1) by sacrifice, (2) by repentance at death or on Yom Kippur, (3) in the case of the lighter transgressions of the positive or negative precepts, by repentance at any time [...] The graver sins, according to Rabbi, are apostasy, heretical interpretation of the Torah, and non-circumcision (Yoma 86a). The atonement for sins between a man and his neighbor is an ample apology (Yoma 85b)." The Jewish Encyclopedia states, "Most efficacious seemed to be the atoning power of suffering experienced by the righteous during the Exile. This is the idea underlying the description of the suffering servant of God in Isa. liii. 4, 12, Hebr. [...] of greater atoning power than all the Temple sacrifices was the suffering of the elect ones who were to be servants and witnesses of the Lord (Isa. xlii. 1–4, xlix. 1–7, l. 6). This idea of the atoning power of the suffering and death of the righteous finds expression also in IV Macc. vi. 27, xvii. 21–23; M. Ḳ. 28a; Pesiḳ. xxvii. 174b; Lev. R. xx.; and formed the basis of Paul's doctrine of the atoning blood of Christ (Rom. iii. 25).") the essence of Paul's writing is not in the "legal terms" regarding the expiation of sin, but the act of "participation in Christ through dying and rising with him." According to Sanders, "those who are baptized into Christ are baptized into his death, and thus they escape the power of sin [...] he died so that the believers may die with him and consequently live with him." By this participation in Christ's death and rising, "one receives forgiveness for past offences, is liberated from the powers of sin, and receives the Spirit."

=== Relationship with Judaism ===
Some scholars see Paul as completely in line with 1st-century Judaism (a Pharisee and student of Gamaliel as presented by Acts), others see him as opposed to 1st-century Judaism (see Marcionism), while the majority see him as somewhere in between these two extremes, opposed to insistence on keeping the "Ritual Laws" (for example the circumcision controversy in early Christianity) as necessary for entrance into God's New Covenant, but in full agreement on "Divine Law". These views of Paul are paralleled by the views of Biblical law in Christianity.

Paul redefined the people of Israel, those he calls the "true Israel" and the "true circumcision" as those who had faith in the heavenly Christ, thus excluding those he called "Israel after the flesh" from his new covenant. He also held the view that the Torah given to Moses was valid "until Christ came," so that even Jews are no longer "under the Torah," nor obligated to follow the commandments or mitzvot as given to Moses.

— Tabor 2013

Paul is critical both theologically and empirically of claims of moral or lineal superiority of Jews while conversely strongly sustaining the notion of a special place for the Children of Israel. Paul's theology of the gospel accelerated the separation of the messianic sect of Christians from Judaism, a development contrary to Paul's own intent. He wrote that faith in Christ was alone decisive in salvation for Jews and Gentiles alike, making the schism between the followers of Christ and mainstream Jews inevitable and permanent. He argued that Gentile converts did not need to become Jews, get circumcised, follow Jewish dietary restrictions, or otherwise observe Mosaic laws to be saved.

According to Paula Fredriksen, Paul's opposition to male circumcision for Gentiles is in line with Old Testament predictions that "in the last days the gentile nations would come to the God of Israel, as gentiles (e.g., Zechariah 8:20–23), not as proselytes to Israel." For Paul, Gentile male circumcision was therefore an affront to God's intentions. According to Hurtado, "Paul saw himself as what Munck called a salvation-historical figure in his own right," who was "personally and singularly deputized by God to bring about the predicted ingathering (the "fullness") of the nations."

According to Sanders, Paul insists that salvation is received by the grace of God; according to Sanders, this insistence is in line with Judaism of c. 200 BC until 200 AD, which saw God's covenant with Israel as an act of grace of God. Observance of the Law is needed to maintain the covenant, but the covenant is not earned by observing the Law, but by the grace of God.

Sanders' publications have since been taken up by Professor James Dunn who coined the phrase "The New Perspective on Paul". N.T. Wright, the Anglican Bishop of Durham, notes a difference in emphasis between Galatians and Romans, the latter being much more positive about the continuing covenant between God and his ancient people than the former. Wright also contends that performing Christian works is not insignificant but rather proof of having attained the redemption of Jesus Christ by grace (free gift received by faith). He concludes that Paul distinguishes between performing Christian works which are signs of ethnic identity and others which are a sign of obedience to Christ.

=== World to come ===
N. T. Wright argues that Paul's eschatology was not static, developing in his later epistles the idea that he would probably not see the Second Coming in his lifetime. Wright also argues that this shift was due to perspective and not belief. Ehrman and Rowland argue that Paul held an apocalyptic eschatology, though he is unspecific about times and seasons and encourages his hearers to expect a delay in his letters to Thessalonica. Dale Allison and Christopher Hays argue for a contingent eschatology in the Pauline epistles where God's judgment is conditional on Israel's repentance; Hays thus suggests that unfulfilled imminent expectations would not be failures or unusual in the Jewish prophetic context. Paul expected that Christians who had died in the meantime would be resurrected to share in God's kingdom, and he believed that the saved would be transformed, assuming heavenly, imperishable bodies.

Before his conversion he believed God's messiah would put an end to the old age of evil, and initiate a new age of righteousness; after his conversion, he believed this would happen in stages that had begun with the resurrection of Jesus, but the old age would continue until Jesus returns.

=== Role of women ===
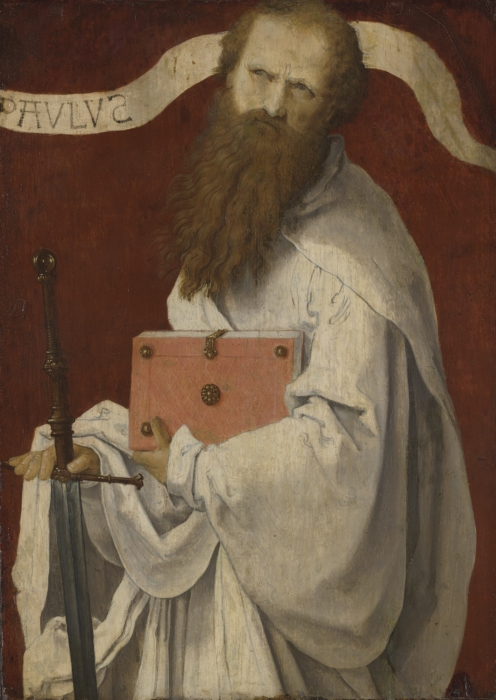
A 16th century portrait of Paul the Apostle attributed to Lucas van Leyden

The second chapter of the first letter to Timothy—one of the six disputed letters—is used by many churches to deny women a vote in church affairs, reject women from serving as teachers of adult Bible classes, prevent them from serving as missionaries, and generally disenfranchise women from the duties and privileges of church leadership.

^{9}In like manner also, that women adorn themselves in modest apparel, with shamefacedness and sobriety; not with broided hair, or gold, or pearls, or costly array;
^{10}But (which becometh women professing godliness) with good works.
^{11}Let the woman learn in silence with all subjection.
^{12}But I suffer not a woman to teach, nor to usurp authority over the man, but to be in silence.
^{13}For Adam was first formed, then Eve.
^{14}And Adam was not deceived, but the woman being deceived was in the transgression.
^{15}Notwithstanding she shall be saved in childbearing, if they continue in faith and charity and holiness with sobriety.

— 1 Timothy 2:9–15

The King James Bible (Authorised Version) translation of this passage taken literally says that women in the churches are to have no leadership roles vis-à-vis men.

Fuller Seminary theologian J. R. Daniel Kirk finds evidence in Paul's letters of a much more inclusive view of women. He writes that Romans 16 is a tremendously important witness to the important role of women in the early church. Paul praises Phoebe for her work as a deaconess and Junia who is described by Paul in Scripture as being respected among the Apostles. It is Kirk's observation that recent studies suggest that the passage in 1 Corinthians 14 ordering women to "be silent" during worship was a later addition, apparently by a different author, and not part of Paul's original letter to the Corinthians.

Other scholars, such as Giancarlo Biguzzi, believe that Paul's restriction on women speaking in 1 Corinthians 14 is genuine to Paul but applies to a particular case where there were local problems of women, who were not allowed in that culture to become educated, asking questions or chatting during worship services. He does not believe it to be a general prohibition on any woman speaking in worship settings since in 1 Corinthians Paul affirms the right (responsibility) of women to prophesy.

Biblical prophecy is more than "fore-telling": two-thirds of its inscripturated form involves "forth-telling", that is, setting the truth, justice, mercy, and righteousness of God against the backdrop of every form of denial of the same. Thus, to speak prophetically was to speak boldly against every form of moral, ethical, political, economic, and religious disenfranchisement observed in a culture that was intent on building its own pyramid of values vis-a-vis God's established system of truth and ethics.

— Baker's Evangelical Dictionary of Biblical Theology

There were Israelite female prophets in the largely patriarchal era of antiquity, as recorded in the Hebrew Bible (Tanakh). Just as the second of the three main divisions of the Tanakh is called Nevi’im ("Prophets"), the most common term for prophet in the Hebrew Bible is navi in the masculine form, and neviah in the Hebrew feminine form. This feminine word form, prophetess, is used six times of women who performed the same task of receiving and proclaiming the message given by God. These women include Miriam, Aaron and Moses' sister, Deborah, the prophet Isaiah's wife, and Huldah, the one who interpreted the Book of the Law discovered in the temple during the days of Josiah. There were false prophetesses just as there were false prophets. The prophetess Noadiah was among those who tried to intimidate Nehemiah. Apparently, they held equal rank in prophesying right along with Abraham, Isaac, Jacob, Moses, Elisha, Aaron, and Samuel.

Kirk's third example of a more inclusive view is Galatians 3:28:

There is neither Jew nor Gentile, neither slave nor free, nor is there male and female, for you are all one in Christ Jesus.

— Galatians 3:28

In pronouncing an end within the church to the divisions which are common in the world around it, he concludes by highlighting the fact that "there were New Testament women who taught and had authority in the early churches, that this teaching and authority was sanctioned by Paul, and that Paul himself offers a theological paradigm within which overcoming the subjugation of women is an anticipated outcome".

Classicist Evelyn Stagg and theologian Frank Stagg believe that Paul was attempting to "Christianize" the societal household or domestic codes that significantly oppressed women and empowered men as the head of the household. The Staggs present a serious study of what has been termed the New Testament domestic code, also known as the Haustafel. The two main passages that explain these "household duties" are Paul's letters to the Ephesians and to the Colossians. An underlying Household Code is also reflected in four additional Pauline letters and 1 Peter: 1 Timothy 2:1ff, 8ff; 3:1ff, 8ff; 5:17ff; 6:1f; Titus 2:1–10 and 1 Peter. Biblical scholars have typically treated the Haustafel in Ephesians as a resource in the debate over the role of women in ministry and in the home. Margaret MacDonald argues that the Haustafel, particularly as it appears in Ephesians, was aimed at "reducing the tension between community members and outsiders".

E. P. Sanders has labeled Paul's remark in 1 Corinthians about women not making any sound during worship as "Paul's intemperate outburst that women should be silent in the churches". Women, in fact, played a very significant part in Paul's missionary endeavors:

- He became a partner in ministry with the couple Priscilla and Aquila who are specifically named seven times in the New Testament—always by their couple name and never individually. Of the seven times they are named in the New Testament, Priscilla's name appears first in five of those instances, suggesting to some scholars that she was the head of the family unit. They lived, worked, and traveled with the Apostle Paul, becoming his honored, much-loved friends and coworkers in Jesus. In Romans 16:3–4, thought to have been written in 56 or 57, Paul sends his greetings to Priscilla and Aquila and proclaims that both of them "risked their necks" to save Paul's life.
- Chloe was an important member of the church in Corinth.
- Phoebe was a "deacon" and a "benefactor" of Paul and others.
- Romans 16 names eight other women active in the Christian movement, including Junia ("prominent among the apostles"), Mary ("who has worked very hard among you"), and Julia.
- Women were frequently among the major supporters of the new Christian movement.

Beth Allison Barr believes that Paul's beliefs on women were progressive for the time period. Barr notes that medieval theologians rarely quoted him to support their patriarchal views and that Pope John Paul II believed that using these passages to support the inferiority of women would be akin to justifying slavery, due to the historical context of the household codes. Wives, like slaves, were considered to be under male authority in Roman law. Barr believes that Paul's intended message was to counter these ideals: he addresses women first and places Jesus as the ultimate authority that everyone was meant to submit to. She also notes that Paul did not believe that women were "deformed men" like his Roman contemporaries and used maternal language most frequently, often using such metaphors to describe himself as a woman. Barr believes that Roman authorities thought that early Christians were "gender deviants" precisely because they did not enforce the household codes as intended. She also believes that Paul was quoting Cicero when saying that women should be silent, before going on to counter this reasoning, and that this is more obvious when the verses are read aloud.

=== Views on homosexuality ===
Most Christian traditions say Paul clearly portrays homosexuality as sinful in two specific locations: Romans 1:26–27, and 1 Corinthians 6:9–10. Another passage, 1 Timothy 1:8–11, addresses the topic more obliquely. Since the 19th century, however, most scholars have concluded that 1 Timothy (along with 2 Timothy and Titus) is not original to Paul, but rather an unknown Christian writing in Paul's name some time in the late-1st to mid-2nd century.

== Influence ==
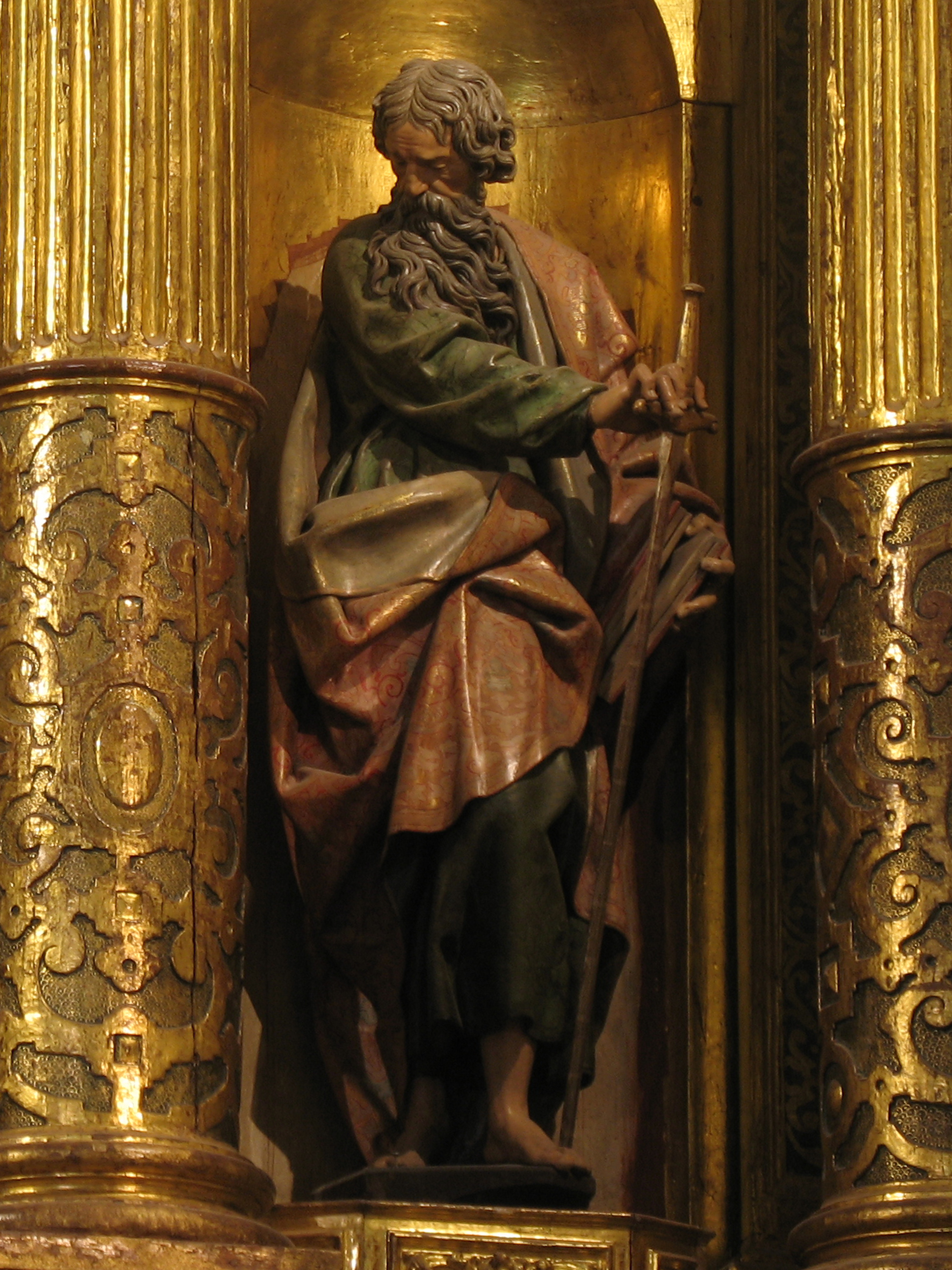
A 1606 statue of St. Paul by Gregorio Fernández

Paul's influence on Christian thinking arguably has been more significant than any other New Testament author. Paul declared that "Christ is the end of the law", exalted the Christian church as the body of Christ, and depicted the world outside the church as under judgment. Paul's writings include the earliest reference to the "Lord's Supper", a rite traditionally identified as the Christian communion or Eucharist. In the East, church fathers attributed the element of election in Romans 9 to divine foreknowledge. The themes of predestination found in Western Christianity do not appear in Eastern theology.

=== Pauline Christianity ===
Paul had a strong influence on early Christianity. Hurtado notes that Paul regarded his own Christological views and those of his predecessors and that of the Jerusalem Church as essentially similar. According to Hurtado, this "work[s] against the claims by some scholars that Pauline Christianity represents a sharp departure from the religiousness of Judean 'Jesus movements'."

=== Marcion ===
Marcionism, regarded as heresy by contemporary mainstream Christianity, was an Early Christian dualist belief system that originated in the teachings of Marcion of Sinope at Rome around the year 144. (Note: 115 years and 6 months from the Crucifixion, according to Tertullian's reckoning in Adversus Marcionem, xv) Marcion asserted that Paul was the only apostle who had rightly understood the new message of salvation as delivered by Christ.

Marcion believed Jesus was the savior sent by God, and Paul the Apostle was his chief apostle, but he rejected the Hebrew Bible and the God of Israel. Marcionists believed that the wrathful Hebrew God was a separate and lower entity than the all-forgiving God of the New Testament.

=== Augustine ===
In his account of his conversion experience, Augustine of Hippo gave his life to Christ after reading Romans 13. Augustine's foundational work on the gospel as a gift (grace), on morality as life in the Spirit, on predestination, and on original sin all derives from Paul, especially Romans.

=== Reformation ===
In his account of his conversion, Martin Luther wrote about righteousness in Romans 1, praising Romans as the perfect gospel, in which the Reformation was birthed. Martin Luther's interpretation of Paul's writings influenced his doctrine of sola fide.

=== John Calvin ===
John Calvin said the Book of Romans opens to anyone an understanding of the whole Scripture.

=== Modern theology ===
Visit any church service, Roman Catholic, Protestant or Greek Orthodox, and it is the apostle Paul and his ideas that are central – in the hymns, the creeds, the sermons, the invocation and benediction, and of course, the rituals of baptism and the Holy Communion or Mass. Whether birth, baptism, confirmation, marriage or death, it is predominantly Paul who is evoked to express meaning and significance.

— Professor James D. Tabor for the Huffington Post

In his commentary The Epistle to the Romans (German: Der Römerbrief; particularly in the thoroughly re-written second edition of 1922), Karl Barth argued that the God who is revealed in the cross of Jesus challenges and overthrows any attempt to ally God with human cultures, achievements, or possessions.

In addition to the many questions about the true origins of some of Paul's teachings posed by historical figures as noted above, some modern theologians also hold that the teachings of Paul differ markedly from those of Jesus as found in the Gospels. Barrie Wilson states that Paul differs from Jesus in terms of the origin of his message, his teachings and his practices. Some have even gone so far as to claim that, due to these apparent differences in teachings, that Paul was no less than the "second founder" of Christianity (Jesus being its first).

As in the Eastern tradition in general, Western humanists interpret the reference to election in Romans 9 as reflecting divine foreknowledge.

== Views on Paul ==
=== In Judaism ===
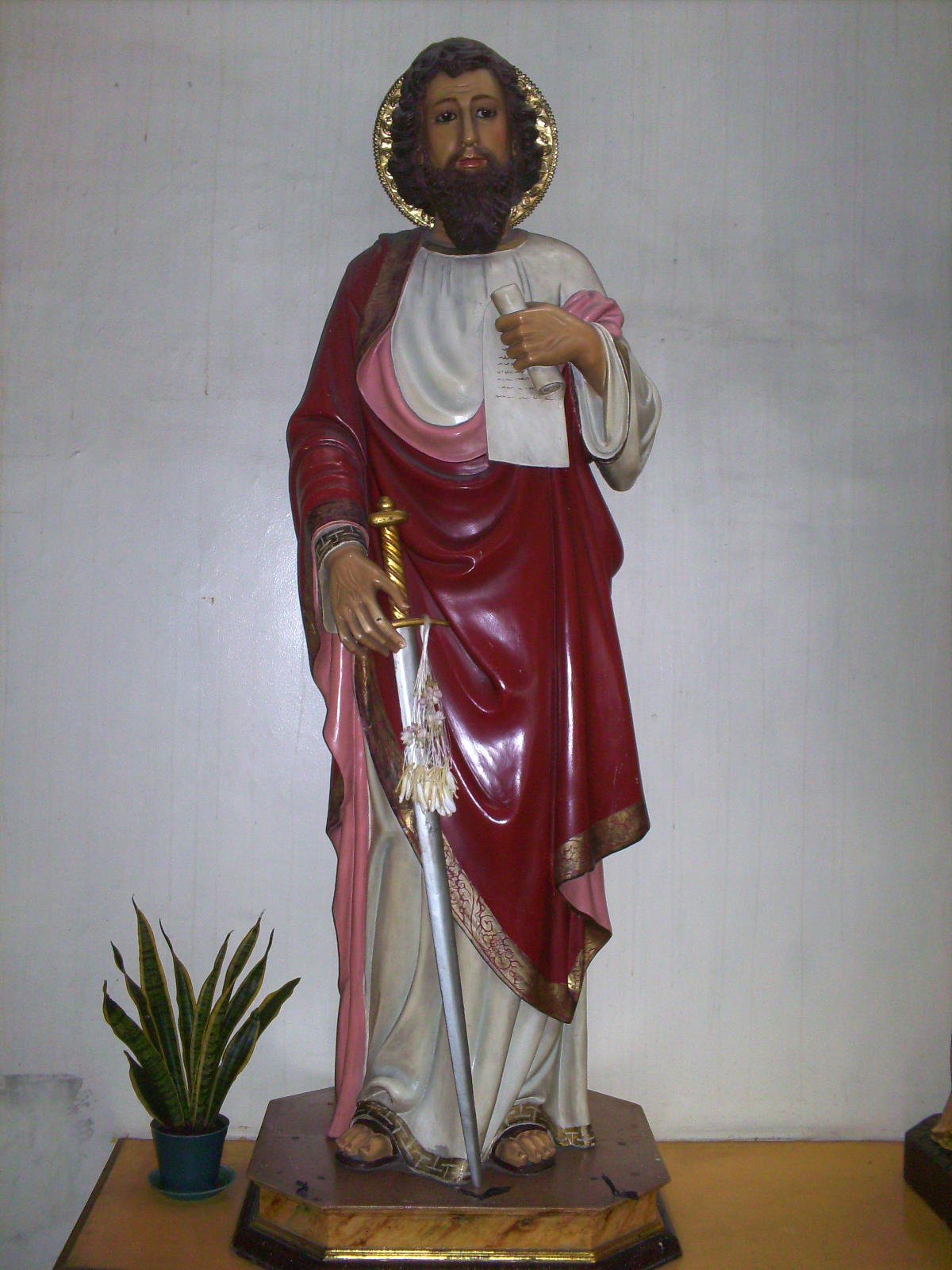
A statue of Paul holding a scroll, symbolising the Scriptures, and a sword, symbolising his martyrdom

Jewish interest in Paul is a recent phenomenon. Before the positive historical reevaluations of Jesus by some Jewish thinkers in the 18th and 19th centuries, he had hardly featured in the popular Jewish imagination, and little had been written about him by the religious leaders and scholars. Arguably, he is absent from the Talmud and rabbinical literature, although he makes an appearance in some variants of the medieval polemic Toledot Yeshu (as a particularly effective spy for the rabbis). The Karaite scholar Jacob Qirqisani also believed that Paul created Christianity by introducing the doctrine of Trinitarianism.

However, with Jesus no longer regarded as the paradigm of gentile Christianity, Paul's position became more important in Jewish historical reconstructions of their religion's relationship with Christianity. He has featured as the key to building barriers (e.g. Heinrich Graetz and Martin Buber) or bridges (e.g. Isaac Mayer Wise and Claude G. Montefiore) in interfaith relations, as part of an intra-Jewish debate about what constitutes Jewish authenticity (e.g. Joseph Klausner and Hans Joachim Schoeps), and on occasion as a dialogical partner (e.g. Richard L. Rubenstein and Daniel Boyarin). Boyarin in particular reads Paul as a 'Jewish thinker', one who 'lived and died convinced he was a Jew living out Judaism.'

He features in an oratorio (by Felix Mendelssohn), a painting (by Ludwig Meidner) and a play (by Franz Werfel), and there have been several novels about Paul (by Shalom Asch and Samuel Sandmel). Jewish philosophers (including Baruch Spinoza, Leo Shestov, and Jacob Taubes) and Jewish psychoanalysts (including Sigmund Freud and Hanns Sachs) have engaged with the apostle as one of the most influential figures in Western thought. Scholarly surveys of Jewish interest in Paul include those by Hagner 1980, pp. 143–65, Meissner 1996, Langton 2010, Langton 2011a, pp. 55–72 and Langton 2011b, pp. 585–87.

=== In Gnosticism ===
Gnosticism is a modern umbrella term referring to a variety of religious and philosophical traditions that developed among early Christian sects in the 2nd (and possibly late 1st) century. These traditions would come to be viewed as heretical by proto-orthodox Christians.

Paul's epistles were popular among Gnostics for a number of reasons. For one, Paul claimed to have received his gospel directly by revelation from God - a claim that appealed to Gnostics, who maintained that they received gnosis, or knowledge, from Christ. Additionally, Paul referred to some church members as "having knowledge" (Greek: τὸν ἔχοντα γνῶσιν, ton ekonta gnosin). His epistles were read by the Naassenes, Cainites, and Valentinians, with Valentinians claiming that Valentinus was a student of Theudas, and Theudas a student of Paul. Additionally, James Dunn notes that, at times, Paul affirmed views that were closer to Gnosticism than proto-orthodox Christianity.

Elaine Pagels writes that evidence from Gnostic sources may challenge the assumption that Paul wrote his letters to combat "gnostic opponents." Instead, she argues that Paul could be considered a proto-Gnostic and a proto-Catholic.

=== In Islam ===
Muslim views of Paul (Arabic: بولس, romanized: Būlus) have ranged from critical to interpretive across history. Early Muslim writers generally depicted him as a figure who altered the original revealed teachings of Jesus, while later scholars developed these assessments into more structured theological and philosophical critiques. According to some perspectives, Paul is said to have introduced foreign elements into Christian doctrine—including pagan influences, the formulation of Christianity as a theology of the cross, and the doctrines of original sin and vicarious redemption—all of which are viewed in Islamic theology as incompatible with the concept of pure monotheism (tawḥīd).

==== Early period ====
In early Islamic historiography, Paul is occasionally mentioned in relation to Christian history, though not recognized as a disciple. Ibn Ishaq (d. 767), as cited by al-Tabari and al-Qurtubi, records a narrative in which Paul is sent alongside Peter to Rome, though he clarifies that Paul was not a disciple (ḥawārī) but a later follower. Some tafsīr literature, including works by Al-Baghawi and Ibn Kathir, link Paul to verses such as Surah Ya-Sin 36:14, though these interpretations—derived from Isra'iliyyat traditions—are not universally accepted. Ali ibn Ibrahim al-Qummi (d. 919) listed Paul as a theological opponent of Jesus, grouping him with heretical figures like Marcion and Barzatiq, stating that each prophet had an adversary and that Paul was the one sent against Jesus.

==== Classical period ====
In theological critique, al-Qadi Abd al-Jabbar (d. 1025) asserted that Paul altered the Gospel, abolished the Mosaic law, and promoted permissiveness, declaring circumcision and Sabbath observance no longer required and wine permissible. Al-Shahrastani (d. 1153) accused Paul of distorting divine knowledge by mixing it with philosophical speculations, stating he corrupted Peter's message through Greek metaphysics.

In polemical literature, Paul plays a role analogous to that of the later figure Abdullah ibn Saba', who is alleged to have attempted to undermine Islam from within. Scholars such as Ibn Taymiyya (d. 1328) argued that while Paul succeeded in corrupting Christianity, Ibn Saba' failed in his efforts against Islam. He wrote that Paul "entered the religion of the Christians and corrupted it to mislead them." Sayf ibn Umar (d. ±786–809) claimed that certain rabbis persuaded Paul to deliberately misguide early Christians by introducing what Ibn Hazm (d. 1064) viewed as objectionable doctrines into Christianity. Ibn Hazm repeated Sayf's claims and regarded Paul as the principal figure responsible for introducing theological innovations inconsistent with Islamic monotheism. Ibn Hazm likewise claimed that the Jews even admitted to Paul's subversive role.

==== Modern era ====
In the modern era, Paul has been the subject of renewed criticism by a range of Muslim scholars. Syed Muhammad Naquib al-Attas argued that Paul was chiefly responsible for distorting the original message of Jesus by introducing foreign philosophical concepts and shifting the focus of the religion away from its Semitic, prophetic origins. Rashid Rida accused Paul of introducing shirk (polytheism) into Christianity. Mohammad Ali Jouhar quoted Adolf von Harnack's critical writings on Paul. Reza Aslan wrote that Paul redefined Jesus into a new theological construct unrecognizable to Judaism: "Christ ... seems almost wholly of his [Paul's] own making."

Ismail al-Faruqi offered one of the most systematic Muslim critiques of Pauline theology. He argued that Paul introduced doctrines absent from Jesus' original teachings, stating that "what Jesus did not furnish, Paul was ready to offer to Christianity," including the ideas of incarnation, crucifixion, and salvation through atonement. He identified Paul's ambiguous formulations as the source of key dogmas such as original sin (peccatism) and vicarious redemption (saviourism), rather than anything traceable to Jesus himself. Al-Faruqi further noted that Pauline theology retained structural ties to Greco-Roman mystery religions, particularly in its use of sacramental and incarnational motifs, which he regarded as incompatible with the Islamic emphasis on divine transcendence.

By contrast, others have offered more charitable or literary appraisals. Shabbir Akhtar, in his study of Paul's epistles, described him as a "prophet manqué"—a man of spiritual ambition who failed to attain true prophethood. Akhtar wrote: "If Muhammad was the last prophet, Paul was the lost prophet. That is the most charitable Islamic verdict on the man Muslims see as the founder of Christianity." Mustafa Akyol, a Turkish journalist and public intellectual, likewise rejects polemical portrayals of Paul as a conspirator and instead offers a more historically grounded evaluation. He writes: "At the end of the day, it seems astonishing how the vision of Paul, a man who had never seen or heard Jesus with his earthly eyes and ears, defined the Christ to the world and built the foundation of the greatest religion that has ever existed." Akyol concludes: "If there can be any informed Islamic critique of Paul, it can be that he parted ways with Judaism too much."

=== Other views ===
Other critics of Paul the Apostle include United States president Thomas Jefferson, a Deist who wrote that Paul was the "first corrupter of the doctrines of Jesus." Christian anarchists, Leo Tolstoy and Ammon Hennacy, as well as German philosopher Friedrich Nietzsche held similar views.

Discussions in Bahá'í scholarship have focused on whether Paul changed the original message of Christ or delivered the true gospel, there being proponents of both positions.

== See also ==
- Achaicus of Corinth
- Collegiate Parish Church of St Paul's Shipwreck
- Conversion of Paul the Apostle
- List of biblical figures identified in extra-biblical sources
- New Perspective on Paul
- Old Testament: Christian views of the Law
- Paul, Apostle of Christ, 2018 film
- Pauline mysticism
- Pauline privilege
- Persecution of Christians in the New Testament
- Persecution of religion in ancient Rome
- Peter and Paul, 1981 miniseries
- Psychagogy
- St. Paul's Cathedral
