= Incident at Antioch =

1st century dispute in Christianity

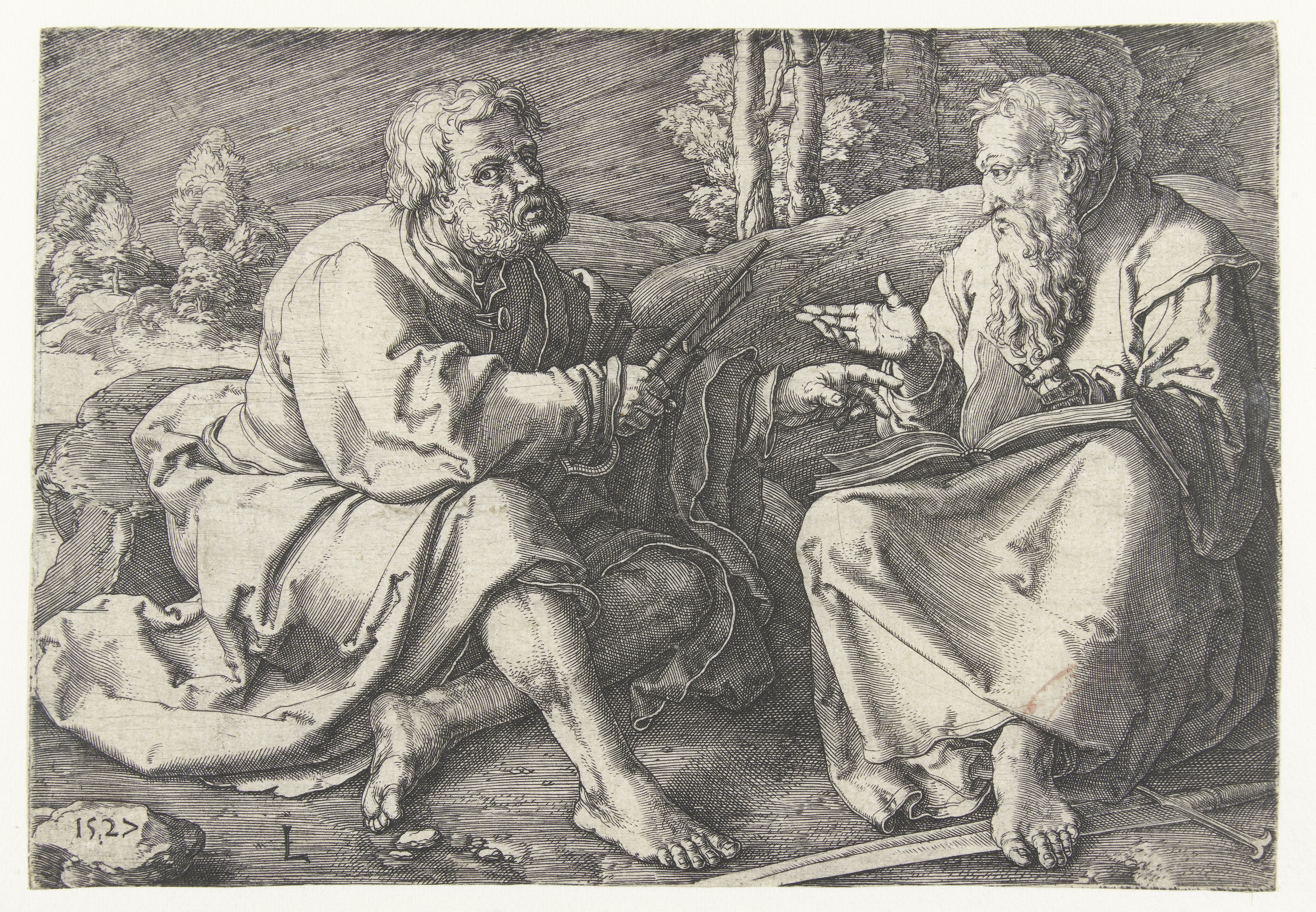
Peter and Paul disputing in Antioch (Lucas van Leyden and Jan Harmensz. Muller, 1527)

The incident at Antioch was an Apostolic Age dispute between the apostles Paul and Peter which occurred in the city of Antioch around the middle of the first century. The primary source for the incident is Paul's Epistle to the Galatians 2:11–14. Since the 19th century figure Ferdinand Christian Baur, biblical scholars have found evidence of conflict among the leaders of early Christianity; for example, James D. G. Dunn proposes that Peter was a "bridge-man" between the opposing views of Paul and James, brother of Jesus. The outcome of the incident remains uncertain, resulting in several Christian views on the Old Covenant.

== Gentile Christians and the Torah ==
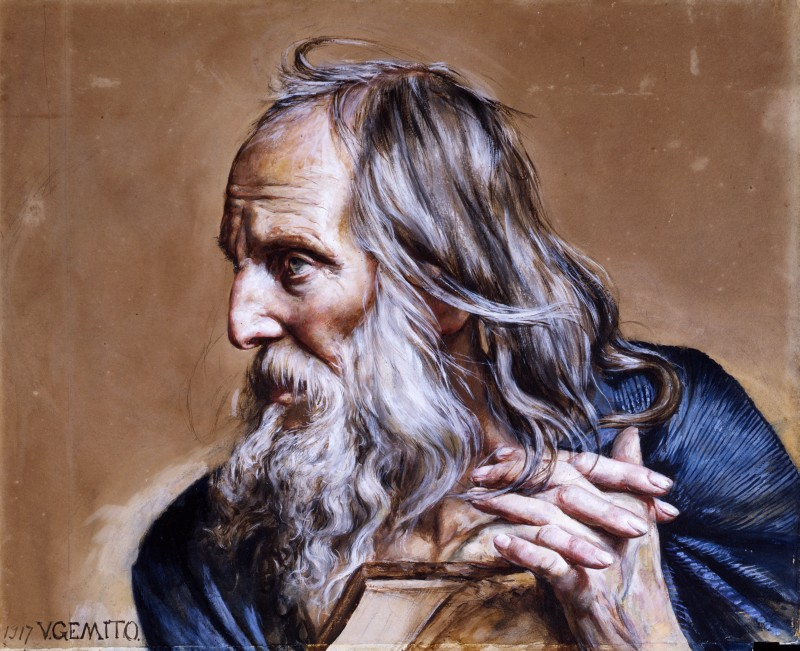
Artistic depiction of Paul the Apostle (Vincenzo Gemito, 1917).

Paul was responsible for bringing Christianity to Ephesus, Corinth, Philippi, and Thessalonica. According to Larry Hurtado, "Paul saw Jesus' resurrection as ushering in the eschatological time foretold by biblical prophets in which the pagan 'Gentile' nations would turn from their idols and embrace the one true God of Israel (e.g., Zechariah 8:20–23), and Paul saw himself as specially called by God to declare God's eschatological acceptance of the Gentiles and summon them to turn to God." According to Krister Stendahl, the main concern of Paul's writings on Jesus' role and salvation by faith is not the individual conscience of human sinners and their doubts about being chosen by God or not, but the problem of the inclusion of Gentile (Greek) Torah-observers into God's covenant. As Gentiles began to convert from Paganism to early Christianity, a dispute arose among Jewish Christian leaders as to whether or not Gentile Christians needed to observe all the tenets of the Law of Moses.

The inclusion of Gentiles into early Christianity posed a problem for the Jewish identity of some of the early Christians: the new Gentile converts were neither required to be circumcised nor to observe the Mosaic Law. Observance of the Jewish commandments, including circumcision, was regarded as a token of the membership of the Abrahamic covenant, and the most traditionalist faction of Jewish Christians (i.e., converted Pharisees) insisted that Gentile converts had to be circumcised as well. By contrast, the rite of circumcision was considered execrable and repulsive during the period of Hellenization of the Eastern Mediterranean, and was especially opposed in Classical civilization both by ancient Greeks and Romans, who instead valued the foreskin positively.

Around the same time period, the subject of Gentiles and the Torah was also debated among the Tannaitic rabbis as recorded in the Talmud. This resulted in the doctrine of the Seven Laws of Noah, to be followed by Gentiles, as well as the determination that "Gentiles may not be taught the Torah." The 18th-century Rabbi Jacob Emden was of the opinion that Jesus' original objective, and especially Paul's, was only to convert Gentiles to follow the Seven Laws of Noah while allowing Jews to keep the Mosaic Law for themselves (see also Dual-covenant theology).

Paul objected strongly to the insistence on keeping all of the Jewish commandments, considering it a great threat to his doctrine of salvation through faith in Christ. According to Paula Fredriksen, Paul's opposition to male circumcision for Gentiles is in line with the Old Testament predictions that "in the last days the gentile nations would come to the God of Israel, as gentiles (e.g., Zechariah 8:20–23), not as proselytes to Israel." For Paul, Gentile male circumcision was therefore an affront to God's intentions. According to Hurtado, "Paul saw himself as what Munck called a salvation-historical figure in his own right", who was "personally and singularly deputized by God to bring about the predicted ingathering (the "fullness") of the nations (Romans 11:25)."

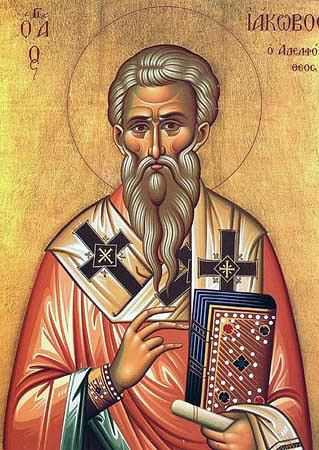
Icon of James, the brother of Jesus ("James the Just"), whose judgment was adopted in the Apostolic Decree according to Acts 15:19–29, c. 50 AD.

== Council of Jerusalem ==
Paul left Antioch and traveled to Jerusalem to discuss his mission to the Gentiles with the Pillars of the Church. Describing the outcome of this meeting, Paul said that "they recognized that I had been entrusted with the gospel for the uncircumcised". The Acts of the Apostles describe the dispute as being resolved by Peter's speech and concluding with a decision by James, the brother of Jesus not to require circumcision from Gentile converts. Acts quotes Peter and James as saying:

"My brothers, you are well aware that from early days God made his choice among you that through my mouth the Gentiles would hear the word of the gospel and believe. And God, who knows the heart, bore witness by granting them the Holy Spirit just as he did us. He made no distinction between us and them, for by faith he purified their hearts. Why, then, are you now putting God to the test by placing on the shoulders of the disciples a yoke that neither our ancestors nor we have been able to bear? On the contrary, we believe that we are saved through the grace of the Lord Jesus, in the same way as they."

— Acts 15:7–11

"It is my judgment, therefore, that we should not make it difficult for the Gentiles who are turning to God. Instead we should write to them, telling them to abstain from food polluted by idols, from sexual immorality, from the meat of strangled animals and from blood."

— Acts 15:19–20

This Apostolic Decree is still observed by the Eastern Orthodox Church.

The historical reliability of the Acts of the Apostles is disputed. While the Council of Jerusalem was described as resulting in an agreement to allow Gentile converts exemption from most Jewish commandments, another group of Jewish Christians, sometimes termed Judaizers, felt that Gentile Christians needed to fully comply with the Law of Moses, and opposed the council's decision.

== Incident ==
According to the Epistle to the Galatians chapter 2, Peter had traveled to Antioch and there was a dispute between him and Paul. The Epistle does not exactly say if this happened after the Council of Jerusalem or before it, but the incident is mentioned in Paul's letter as his next subject after describing a meeting in Jerusalem which some scholars consider to be the council. An alternate theory, which many believe to be better suited to the facts of the incident, is that it took place long before the Jerusalem Council, perhaps shortly after Paul's famine visit of Acts 11. This conclusion makes more sense of Peter's apparent change of heart. Galatians 2:11–13 says:

When Peter came to Antioch, I opposed him to his face, because he was clearly in the wrong. Before certain men came from James, he used to eat with the Gentiles. But when they arrived, he began to draw back and separate himself from the Gentiles because he was afraid of those who belonged to the circumcision group.

To Paul's dismay, the rest of the Jewish Christians in Antioch sided with Peter, including Paul's long-time associate Barnabas:

The rest of the Jews joined in this charade and even Barnabas was drawn into the hypocrisy.

The Acts of the Apostles relates a fallout between Paul and Barnabas soon after the Council of Jerusalem, but gives the reason as the fitness of John Mark to join Paul's mission (Acts 15:36–40). Acts also describes the time when Peter went to the house of a gentile. Acts 11:1–3 says:

The apostles and the believers throughout Judea heard that the Gentiles also had received the word of God. So when Peter went up to Jerusalem, the circumcised believers criticized him and said, "You went into the house of the uncircumcised and ate with them."

This is described as having happened before the death of King Herod (Agrippa) in 44 AD, and thus years before the Council of Jerusalem (dated c. 50). Acts is entirely silent about any confrontation between Peter and Paul, at that or any other time.

Some scholars have argued that the confrontation was actually not between Paul and Peter the Apostle, but another one of the identified 70 disciples of the time who was also named Peter. Such attempts have found little support in mainstream scholarship and have generally been ignored or dismissed.

The final parting of Peter and Paul has been a subject of Christian art, pointing to a tradition of their reconciliation. (Fresco by Franz Joseph Spiegler, 1727)

== Outcome ==
The outcome of the incident remains uncertain; indeed the issue of biblical law in Christianity remains disputed. The Catholic Encyclopedia states: "St. Paul's account of the incident leaves no doubt that St. Peter saw the justice of the rebuke." In contrast, L. Michael White's From Jesus to Christianity states: "The blowup with Peter was a total failure of political bravado, and Paul soon left Antioch as persona non grata, never again to return."

According to Roman Catholic Church tradition, Peter and Paul taught together in Rome and founded Christianity in that city. Eusebius cites Dionysius, Bishop of Corinth as saying, "They taught together in like manner in Italy, and suffered martyrdom at the same time." In 2 Peter 3:16, Paul's letters are referred to as "scripture", which indicates the respect the writer had for Paul's apostolic authority. However, most modern scholars regard the Second Epistle of Peter as written in Peter's name by another author.

== See also ==
- Feast of Saints Peter and Paul
- New Perspective on Paul
- Proselyte

== Bibliography ==
- Bokenkotter, Thomas (2004), A Concise History of the Catholic Church (Revised and expanded ed.), Doubleday, ISBN 0-385-50584-1
- Cross, F. L.; Livingstone, E. A., eds. (2005), The Oxford Dictionary of the Christian Church (3rd Revised ed.), Oxford: Oxford University Press, pp. 1243–5, ISBN 978-0-19-280290-3
- Dunn, James D. G. (2005), Christianity in the Making: Jesus Remembered, vol. 1, Grand Rapids, Michigan: Wm. B. Eerdmans Publishing, ISBN 978-0-8028-3931-2
- Dunn, James D. G. (2009), Christianity in the Making: Beginning from Jerusalem, vol. 2, Grand Rapids, Michigan: Wm. B. Eerdmans Publishing, ISBN 978-0-8028-3932-9
- Dunn, James D. G. (Autumn 1993). "Echoes of Intra-Jewish Polemic in Paul's Letter to the Galatians". Journal of Biblical Literature. 112 (3). Society of Biblical Literature: 459–477. doi:10.2307/3267745. JSTOR 3267745.
- Dunn, James D. G. (1990), "The Incident at Antioch (Gal. 2:11–18)", Jesus, Paul, and the Law: Studies in Mark and Galatians, Louisville, Kentucky: Westminster John Knox Press, ISBN 0-664-25095-5
- Fredriksen, Paula (2018), When Christians Were Jews: The First Generation, London: Yale University Press, ISBN 978-0-300-19051-9
- Hurtado, Larry (2005), Lord Jesus Christ: Devotion to Jesus in Earliest Christianity, Grand Rapids, Michigan: Wm. B. Eerdmans Publishing, ISBN 978-0-8028-3167-5
- McGrath, Alister E. (2006), Christianity: An Introduction, Wiley-Blackwell, ISBN 1-4051-0899-1
