= Law of Christ =

Phrase found in Galatians 6:2

"The law of Christ" (ὁ νόμος τοῦ Χριστοῦ) is a New Testament phrase. The related Bible verses are in the Pauline epistles at Galatians 6:2 and parenthetically (ἔννομος Χριστῷ "being under the law to Christ") at 1 Corinthians 9:21.

Some Christians hold the belief that the crucifixion of Jesus Christ and the inauguration of the New Covenant of Jeremiah 31:31–37 and Ezekiel 37:22–28 "replaces" or "completes" or "fulfills" the Law of Moses found in the Hebrew Bible. Dual-covenant theologians, the Hebrew Roots Movement, and Messianic Judaism are all examples of groups that reject this belief.

Closely related are the subjects of Christian views on the Old Covenant, early Christianity and Judaism, Paul the Apostle and Judaism, abrogation of old covenant laws, and Christian ethics.

== In the Pauline epistles ==
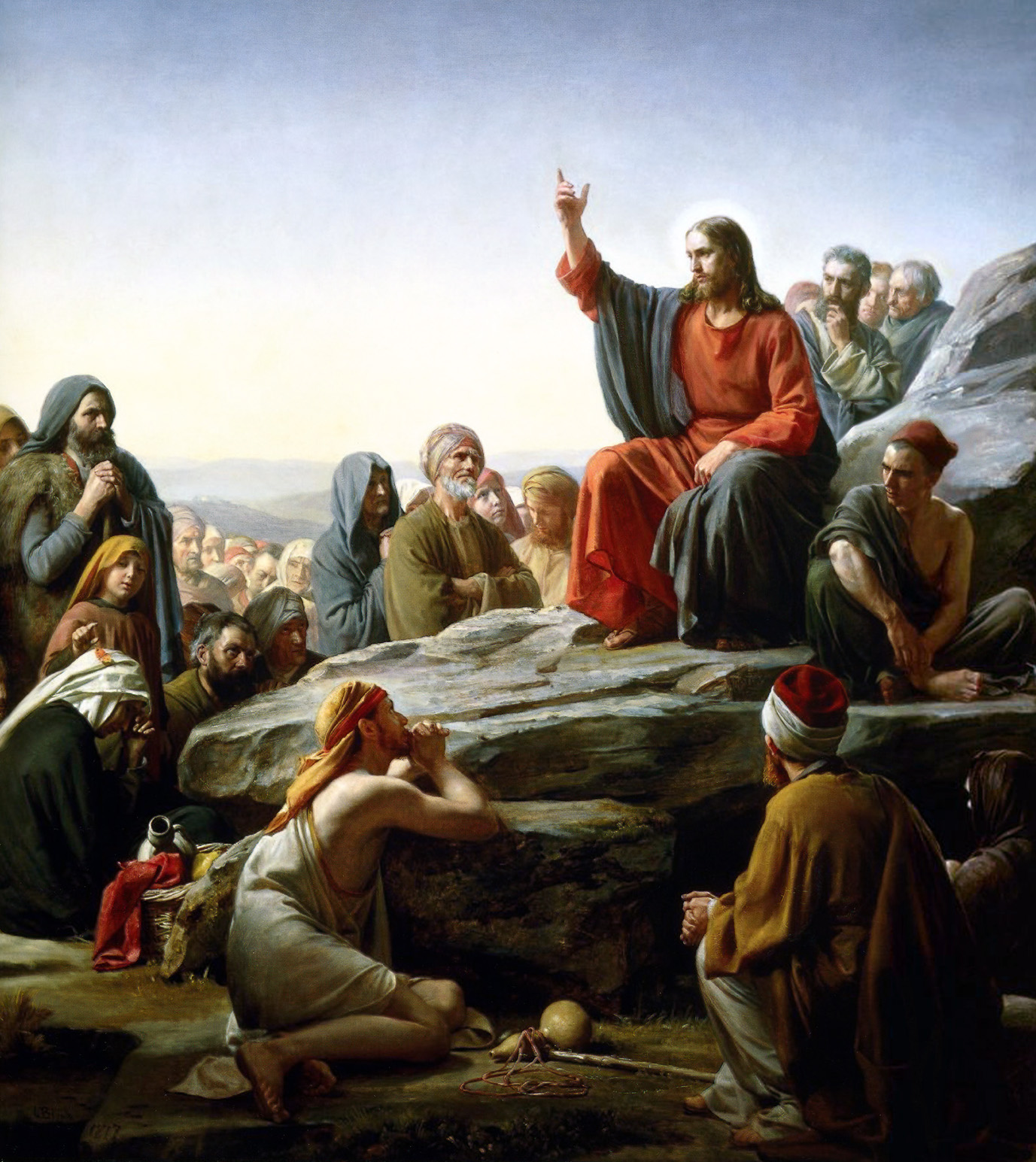
Depicted is the famous Sermon on the Mount of Jesus in which he commented on the Mosaic Law. Christians believe that Jesus is the mediator of the New Covenant. (Note: Such as Hebrews 8:6 etc. See also Fonck 1910)

In the Epistle to the Galatians, written by the Apostle Paul to a number of early Christian communities in the Roman province of Galatia in central Anatolia, he wrote: "Bear one another's burdens, and so fulfill the law of Christ." (Galatians 6:2, NKJV). This phrase appears once and is never defined. It has been suggested that "the law of Christ" could be an allusion to the second greatest commandment ("love thy neighbor") or the New Commandment ("love one another; as I have loved you"). Others suggest this phrase is just another name for "the law of God" as Christians believe that the Messiah is God.

Possibly related, in a letter to the early Christians of Corinth, Greece, in the First Epistle to the Corinthians, Paul wrote: "To those not having the law I became like one not having the law (though I am not free from God's law but am under Christ's law), so as to win those not having the law." (1 Corinthians 9:21, NIV). In the Greek, the wording is, "to those without law, as without law -- (not being without law to God, but within law to Christ) -- that I might gain those without law." (1 Corinthians 9:21, YLT)

It is not clear exactly what Paul means by the phrase, "the law of Christ". Although Paul mentions Biblical law several times (e.g., Romans 2:12–16, 3:31, 7:12, 8:7–8, Galatians 5:3, Acts 24:14, 25:8) and preached about Ten Commandment topics such as idolatry (e.g., 1 Corinthians 5:11, 6:9–10, 10:7, 10:14, Galatians 5:19–21, Ephesians 5:5, Colossians 3:5, Acts 17:16–21, 19:23–41), he consistently denies that salvation, or justification before God, is based on "works of the law" (e.g., Galatians 3:6–14), though the meaning of this phrase is also disputed by scholars; see for example the New Perspective on Paul#Works of the Law.

== In the gospels ==
Many Christians believe that the Sermon on the Mount is a form of commentary on the Ten Commandments. It portrays Christ as the true interpreter of the Mosaic Law. In the Expounding of the Law, Jesus said that he did not come to abolish the law or the prophets, but to fulfill (complete, end, expire) them (Matthew 5:17). Jesus explicitly warns of severe consequence to those who break and teach others to break one of the least of the commands of God (Matthew 5:19).

While the New Testament records several unique sayings of Jesus that may be described as "commandments," it only records one that he explicitly identified as such. This is the New Commandment of John 13:34–35 that the disciples should love one another as he himself had loved them.

At times, Jesus referred to commandments of God from Old Testament scripture. In Matthew 22:36–40, a Pharisee lawyer asked Jesus "which is the great commandment in the Law?" Jesus responded, "You shall love the Lord your God with all your heart and with all your soul and with all your mind. This is the great and first commandment. And a second is like it: You shall love your neighbor as yourself. On these two commandments depend all the Law and the Prophets."

Such commandments, as discussed by or relating to Christ, are commonly seen as a basis of Christian ethics.

== In the Epistle of James ==
James 2:8–13 uses the phrases of "royal law" and "law of liberty" in reference to the Second greatest commandment, part of Leviticus 19:18:

You shall love your neighbor as yourself.

== Theological interpretations ==
In his Summa Theologiae I–II qq. 106–9, a section of the Summa known as the Treatise on Law, Saint Thomas Aquinas discusses the Law of Christ as the "New Law". He argues that it was contained virtually in the Old Law, that is, the Old Testament, as a seed but brought to perfection only by Jesus Christ, who fulfilled it perfectly. The ends of the Old and New are the same, subject to God's order, but they are different in that the New Law makes attaining the end possible. Meanwhile, since all law ultimately has reference to Divine Reason governing all things, the New Law contains and helps the human being fulfill the Natural Law, which prescribes acts of virtue. Thus, Aquinas defines the New Law as "chiefly the grace itself of the Holy Ghost, which is given to those who believe in Christ," but adds that it also "contains certain things that dispose us to receive the grace of the Holy Ghost, and pertaining to the use of that grace." Therefore, "the New Law is in the first place a law that is inscribed on our hearts, but that secondarily it is a written law". (ST I-II q. 106.3)

The Catholic theologian Bernhard Häring presents the Law of Christ as Christ himself in his person because Jesus was able to fulfill the law and provide us with the effect of this fulfillment.

The Evangelical theologian Douglas J. Moo argues that "the law of Christ" is strongly connected to the Mosaic Law, for example, that nine of the Ten Commandments are included.

George R. Law argues that the New Covenant is the Law of Christ and that the details are expressed in the Sermon on the Mount.

== See also ==
- Antinomianism
- Biblical law in Christianity
- Canon law
- Council of Jerusalem
- Cafeteria Christianity
- Evangelical counsels
- Law and Gospel
- Pauline Christianity
- Red-Letter Christian
