= Christian views on the Old Covenant =

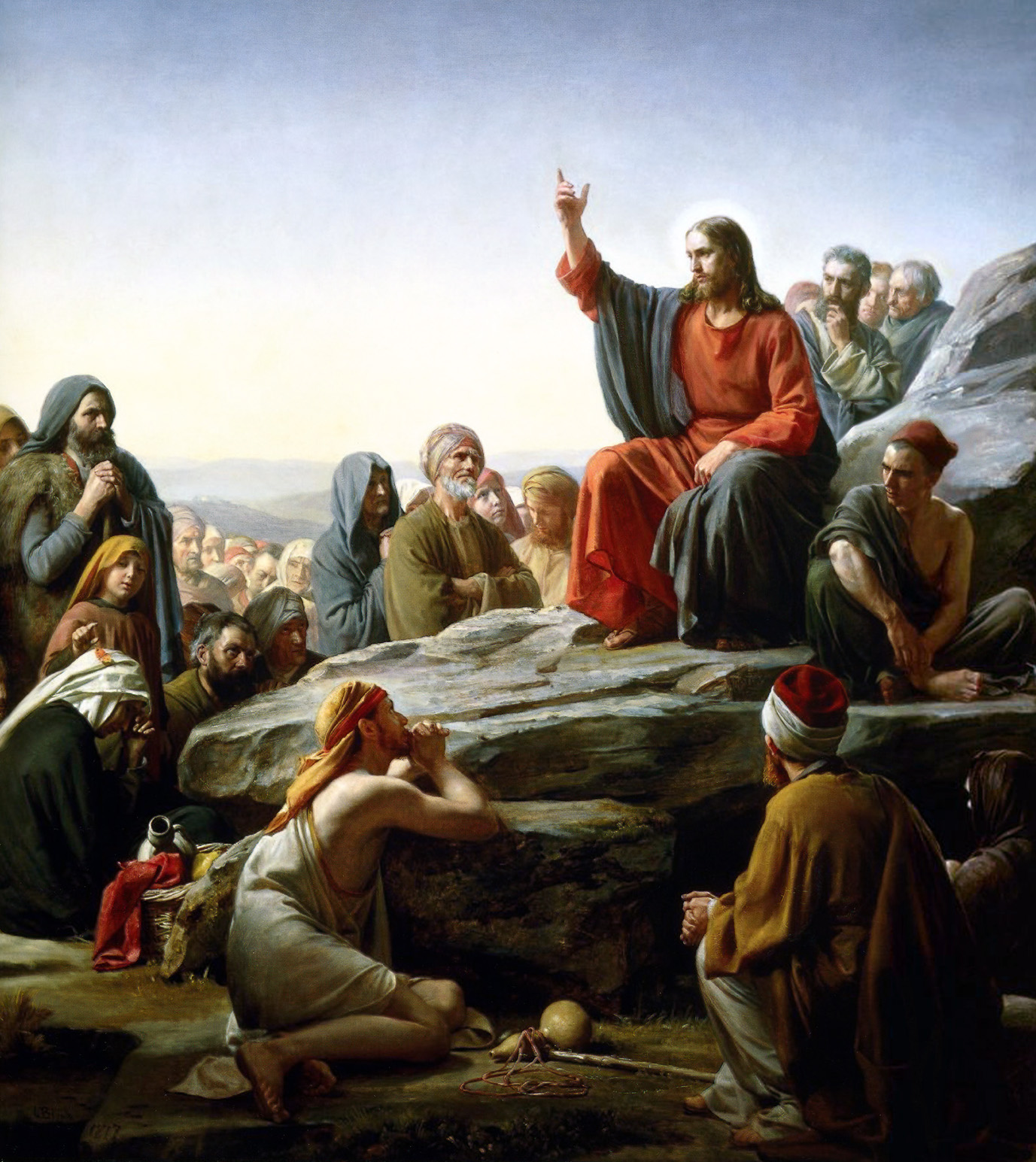
A depiction of the Sermon on the Mount, in which Jesus commented on the Old Covenant. Painting by Carl Heinrich Bloch, Danish painter, d. 1890.

The Mosaic covenant or Law of Moses, which Christians generally call the "Old Covenant" (in contrast to the New Covenant), played an important role in the origins of Christianity and has occasioned serious dispute and controversy since the beginnings of Christianity: note for example Jesus' teaching of the Law during his Sermon on the Mount and the circumcision controversy in early Christianity.

Rabbinic Jews assert that Moses presented the Jewish religious laws to the Jewish people and that those laws do not apply to Gentiles (including Christians), with the exception of the Seven Laws of Noah, which (according to Rabbinic teachings) apply to all people.

Most Christians (including Catholics, Lutherans and Reformed Christians) believe that of the Old Covenant, only parts dealing with the moral law (as opposed to ceremonial law) are still applicable (cf. covenant theology), a minority believe that none apply (cf. dispensationalism), and dual-covenant theologians believe that the Old Covenant remains valid only for Jews. Messianic Jews hold the view that all parts still apply to believers in Jesus and in the New Covenant.

== Catholic and Orthodox views ==
=== Catholic ===
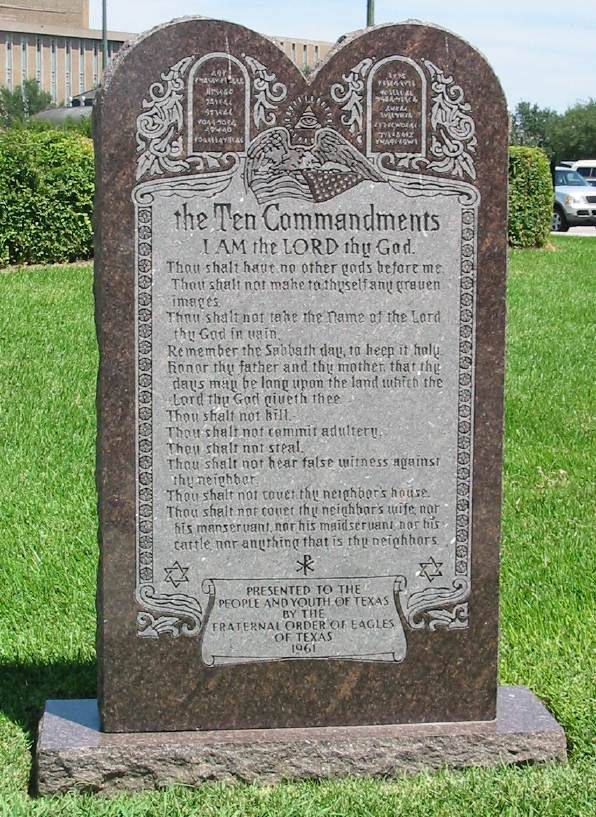
The Ten Commandments on a monument on the grounds of the Texas State Capitol which includes: "Remember the Sabbath day, to keep it holy".

Theologian Thomas Aquinas explained that there are three types of biblical precepts: moral, ceremonial, and judicial. He holds that moral precepts are permanent, having held even before the Law was given, since they are part of the law of nature. Ceremonial precepts (the "ceremonial law", dealing with forms of worshiping God and with ritual cleanness) and judicial precepts (such as those in Exodus 21) came into existence only with the Law of Moses and were only temporary. The ceremonial commands were "ordained to the Divine worship for that particular time and to the foreshadowing of Christ". Accordingly, upon the coming of Christ they ceased to bind, and to observe them now would, Aquinas thought, be equivalent to declaring falsely that Christ has not yet come, for Christians a mortal sin.

However, while the judicial laws ceased to bind with the advent of Christ, it was not a mortal sin to enforce them. Aquinas says, "If a sovereign were to order these judicial precepts to be observed in his kingdom, he would not sin." Although Aquinas believed the specifics of the Old Testament judicial laws were no longer binding, he taught that the judicial precepts contained universal principles of justice that reflected natural law. Thus some scholars refer to his views on government as "General Equity Theonomy".

Unlike the ceremonial and judicial precepts, moral commands continue to bind, and are summed up in the Ten Commandments (though the assigning of the weekly holiday to Saturday is ceremonial). The Catechism of the Catholic Church states:

2068. The Council of Trent teaches that the Ten Commandments are obligatory for Christians and that the justified man is still bound to keep them; the Second Vatican Council confirms: "The bishops, successors of the apostles, receive from the Lord ... the mission of teaching all peoples, and of preaching the Gospel to every creature, so that all men may attain salvation through faith, Baptism and the observance of the Commandments."
2069. ...
2070. The Ten Commandments belong to God's revelation. At the same time they teach us the true humanity of man. They bring to light the essential duties, and therefore, indirectly, the fundamental rights inherent in the nature of the human person. The Decalogue contains a privileged expression of the natural law:
  From the beginning, God had implanted in the heart of man the precepts of the natural law. Then he was content to remind him of them. This was the Decalogue.
  — St. Irenaeus, Adv. haeres. 4, 15, 1: PG 7/1, 1012.
2071. ...
2072. Since they express man's fundamental duties towards God and towards his neighbour, the Ten Commandments reveal, in their primordial content, grave obligations. They are fundamentally immutable, and they oblige always and everywhere. No one can dispense from them. The Ten Commandments are engraved by God in the human heart.

The Roman Catholic Church teaches that the Apostles instituted the religious celebration of Sunday without transferring to it the ceremonial obligations associated with the Jewish Sabbath, (Note: The choice of the last day of the week (Saturday) and the rules about the precise manner of keeping that day holy are seen as ceremonial precepts like those about abstention from eating pork or from having sex with a woman during her periods.) although later some of these obligations became attached to Sunday, not without opposition within the Church. The Roman Catholic Church thus applies to Sunday, the Lord's Day, the Third Commandment. (Note: The Roman Catholic and Lutheran numbering of the Ten Commandments, which are often abbreviated for catechetical purposes (see Catechism of the Catholic Church: The Ten Commandments), differs from that followed by other Protestants.)

=== Eastern Orthodox ===
According to Fr. Lawrence Farley, "The Old Testament remains for most Orthodox a closed book, as if the Bible began not with Genesis, but with the Gospel of Matthew." The Orthodox Church is thought to read the Old Testament in an allegorical and typological sense.

For one example, in Psalm 137, a blessing is pronounced on anyone who takes revenge upon the enemies of Israel by "dashing their infants against the rocks", but here is the new meaning of that passage "the infants are those troublesome sinful thoughts, the early beginnings and promptings of evil; one subdues them by striking them against the firm and solid strength of truth".

The Old Testament is affirmed in its new meaning.

== Classical Protestant views ==
=== Lutheran ===
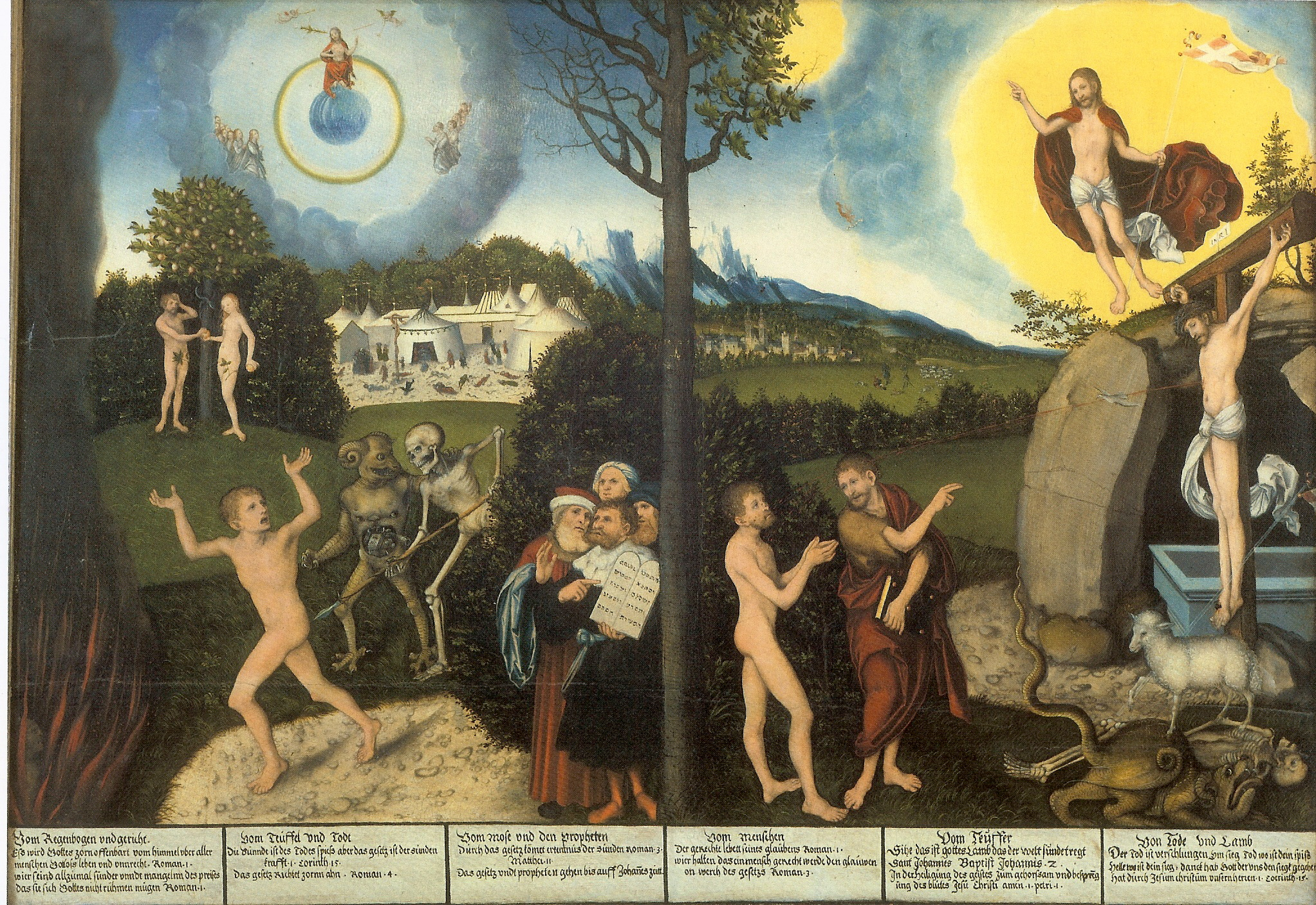
Law and Grace (c. 1529), by Lucas Cranach the Elder, a Lutheran. The left side of the tree illustrates law, while the right side illustrates grace.

The Lutheran Churches divide Mosaic Law into three components: the (1) moral law, (2) civil law, (3) ceremonial law. While the civil law was applicable to the theocracy of Israel and the ceremonial law was applicable until the arrival of Jesus, the moral law as contained in the Ten Commandments remains in force today for Christians.

Article V of the Formula of Concord (1577) of the Lutheran Church declares:

We believe, teach, and confess that the distinction between the Law and the Gospel is to be maintained in the Church with great diligence as an especially brilliant light, by which, according to the admonition of St. Paul, the Word of God is rightly divided.

The distinction between Law and Gospel is that Law demands obedience to God's will, while gospel refers to the promise of forgiveness of sins in the light of the person and work of Jesus Christ. Between 1580 and 1713 (considered the age of Lutheran Orthodoxy) this principle was considered of fundamental importance by Lutheran theologians.

The foundation of evangelical Lutheran biblical exegesis and exposition is contained in the Apology of the Augsburg Confession (Article 4) (1531):

All Scripture ought to be distributed into these two principal topics, the Law and the promises. For in some places it presents the Law, and in others the promise concerning Christ, namely, either when [in the Old Testament] it promises that Christ will come, and offers, for His sake, the remission of sins justification, and life eternal, or when, in the Gospel [in the New Testament], Christ Himself, since He has appeared, promises the remission of sins, justification, and life eternal.

Lutherans, quoting Colossians 2 and Romans 14, believe that circumcision and the other Old Testament ceremonial laws no longer apply to Christians.

=== Reformed ===
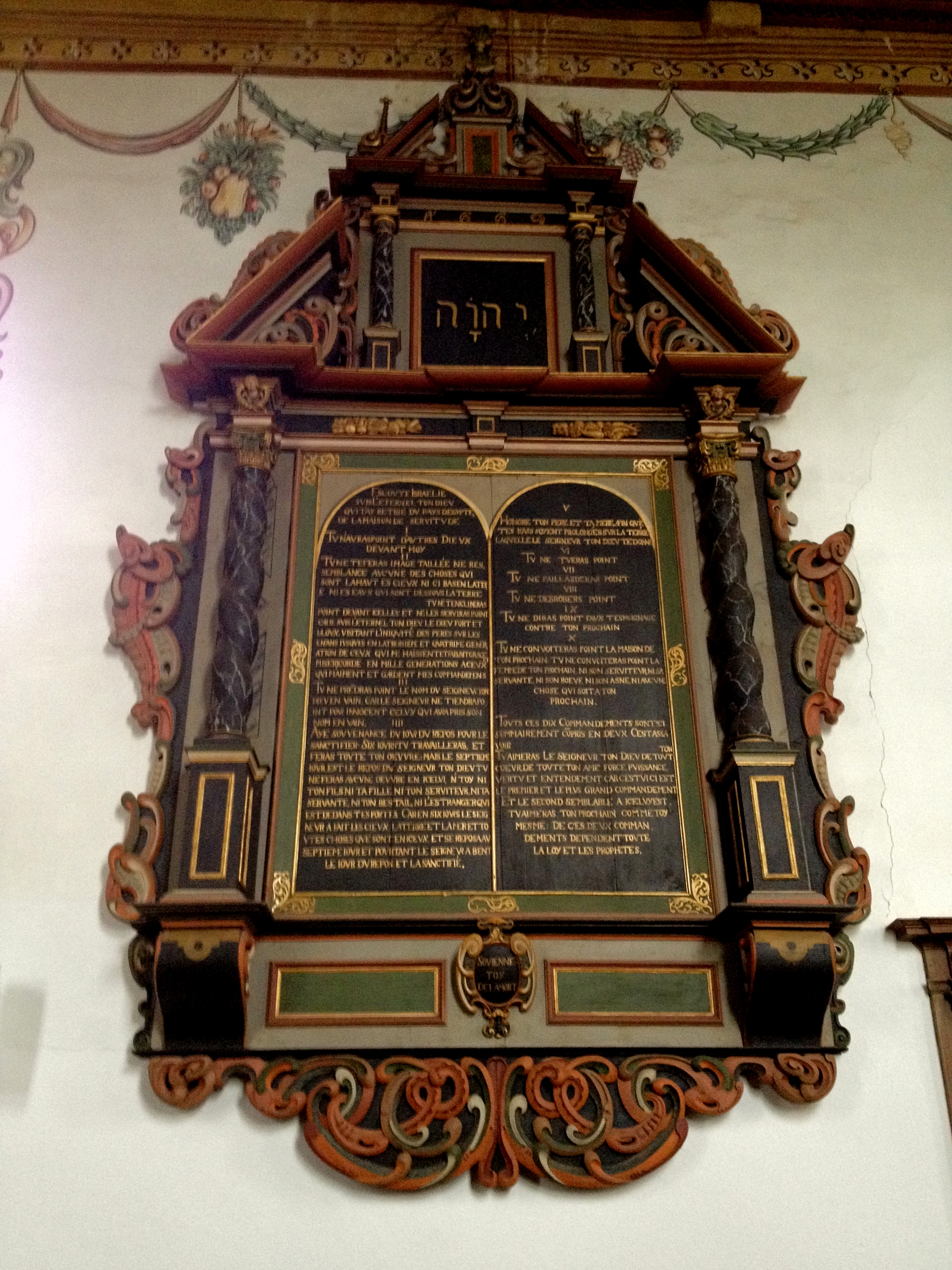
The decalogue of the reformed church of Ligerz, Switzerland

The view of the Reformed churches or Calvinism, referred to as Covenant Theology, is similar to the Roman Catholic view in holding that Mosaic Law continues under the New Covenant, while declaring that parts of it have "expired" and are no longer applicable. The Westminster Confession of Faith (1646) divides the Mosaic laws into three categories: moral, civil, and ceremonial. In the view of the Westminster Divines, only the moral laws of the Mosaic Law, which include the Ten Commandments and the commands repeated in the New Testament, directly apply to Christians today. Ceremonial laws, in this view, include the regulations pertaining to ceremonial cleanliness, festivals, diet, and the Levitical priesthood.

Advocates of this view hold that, while not always easy to do and overlap between categories does occur, the divisions they make are possible and supported based on information contained in the commands themselves; specifically to whom they are addressed, whom or what they speak about, and their content. For example, a ceremonial law might be addressed to the Levites, speak of purification or holiness and have content that could be considered as a foreshadowing of some aspect of Christ's life or ministry. In keeping with this, most advocates also hold that when the Law is spoken of as everlasting, it is in reference to certain divisions of the Law.

=== Anglican and Methodist ===
Anglican and Methodist theology regarding the Old Covenant is expressed by their historic defining statements known as the Thirty-Nine Articles and Twenty Five Articles of Religion, respectively.

Article VII of the Church of England's 39 Articles, as well as Article VI of the Methodist 25 Articles, specify only that Christians are bound by the "commandments which are called moral", but not bound by the ceremonial, ritual, or civil laws from the "law of Moses".

== Modern Protestant views ==
=== Dispensationalism ===
As a theological system, Dispensationalism is rooted in the writings of John Nelson Darby (1800–1882) and the Brethren Movement, but it has never been formally defined and incorporates several variants. Dispensationalists divide the Bible into varying numbers of separate dispensations or ages. Traditional dispensationalists believe only the New Testament applies to today's church, whereas hyperdispensationalists believe only the second half of the New Testament, starting in the middle of Acts or at Acts 28, applies.

Wayne G. Strickland, professor of theology at the Multnomah University, claims that his (not necessarily "the") Dispensationalist view is that "the age of the church has rendered the law inoperative".

This view holds that the Mosaic Laws and the penalties attached to them were limited to the particular historical and theological setting of the Old Testament. In that view, the Law was given to Israel and has not applied since the age of the New Covenant.

Replacing the Mosaic Law is the "Law of Christ", which, however, holds definite similarities with the Mosaic Law in moral concerns but is new and different, replacing the original Law. Despite this difference, Dispensationalists seek to find moral and religious principles applicable today in Mosaic Law.

Believing the New Covenant to be a new dispensation, George R. Law has proposed that the Law of Christ is recorded in Matthew 5–7. He suggests that Matthew's record of the Sermon on the Mount is structured similarly to the literary form of an ancient Near Eastern covenant treaty. Law's theory is built on the work of Viktor Korošec, Donald J. Wiseman, and George E. Mendenhall. Like other variations of the covenant form throughout ancient history, this new covenant form can be identified by its combination of ancient covenant elements. If this record in Matthew can be identified as the record of the promised New Covenant, then its contents can also be identified as the formal presentation of the Law of Christ (and includes Christ's new Ten Commandments).

One view of Dispensationalism divides the Bible into these seven periods:

1. of innocence (Genesis 1:1–3:7), before Adam's fall;
2. of conscience (Genesis 3:8–8:22), Adam to Noah;
3. of government (Genesis 9:1–11:32), Noah to Abraham;
4. of patriarchal rule (Genesis 12:1–Exodus 19:25), Abraham to Moses;
5. of the Mosaic Law (Exodus 20:1–Acts 2:4), Moses to Jesus;
6. of grace (Acts 2:4–Revelation 20:3), the current church age; and
7. of a literal, earthly 1,000-year Millennial Kingdom that has yet to come (Revelation 20:4–20:6).

A misunderstanding of Dispensationalism sees the covenant of Sinai (dispensation #5) to have been replaced by the gospel (dispensation #6). However, Dispensationalists believe that ethnic Israel, distinct from the church and on the basis of the Sinai covenant, is featured in New Testament promises, which they interpret as referring to a future time associated with the Millennium of Revelation 20 (dispensation #7). In Dispensational thought, although the time from Jesus' resurrection until his return (or the advent of the Millennium) is dominated by the proclamation of the gospel, the Sinai covenant is neither terminated nor replaced, instead it is "quiescent" awaiting fulfillment at the Millennium. This time of Jewish restoration has an especially prominent place within Dispensationalism; see also Christian Zionism.

=== Theonomy ===
Starting in the 1970s and 1980s, an obscure branch of Calvinism known as Christian Reconstructionism argued that the civil laws as well as the moral laws should be applied in today's society (a position called Theonomy) as part of establishing a modern theonomic state. This view is a break from the traditional Reformed position, including that of John Calvin and the Puritans, which holds that the civil laws have been abrogated though they remain useful as guidance and revelation of God's character.

Some theonomists embrace the idea that the whole Law continues to function, contending that how Christians observe some commands have changed but not the content or meaning of the commands. For example, they would say that the ceremonial commands regarding Passover were looking forward to Christ's sacrificial death and the Communion mandate is looking back on it, the former is given to the Levitical priesthood and the latter is given to the priesthood of all believers, but both have the same content and meaning.

=== New Covenant Theology ===
New Covenant Theology (or NCT), is a recently expressed Christian theological system on this issue that incorporates aspects of Dispensationalism and Covenant Theology.

NCT claims that Christ has fulfilled all Old Covenant laws and are thus cancelled or abrogated in favor of the Law of Christ or New Covenant law. This can be summarized as the ethical expectation found in the New Testament. Thus, NCT rejects antinomianism as they do not reject religious law, only the Old Covenant law. NCT is in contrast with other views on Biblical law in that most other Christian churches do not believe the Ten Commandments and other divine laws of the Old Covenant have been "cancelled".

New Covenant theologians see the Law of Christ or New Testament Law as including many of the Divine Laws; thus, even though all Old Covenant laws have been canceled, many have still been renewed under the Law of Christ. This conclusion is similar to older Christian theological systems on this issue, which states that some Old Covenant laws are still valid, but this understanding is reached differently.

=== Dual-covenant theology ===
In the years after the Holocaust, at least one article has questioned whether Christianity requires a triumphalist stance towards Judaism. Christianity historically propagated a supersessionist theology that under the New Covenant, Christians were the new spiritual Israel, further, that "the old carnal Israel had been superseded", and Jews discarded by God.

Theological supersessionism is not uniformly believed, with the Catholic Church formally renouncing it during Vatican II. In direct contrast with supersessionism—and also the doctrines of Extra Ecclesiam nulla salus and Solus Christus—is dual-covenant theology, which holds that God's covenant with the Jewish people is everlasting and irrevocable.

=== Torah observance ===
Torah-observant Christians view Mosaic Law as of continuing validity and applicability for Christians under the new covenant. There are both ethnically Jewish and Gentile Torah-observant Christians.

Torah-observant Christians do not believe that the Mosaic Law was first created at Mount Sinai. Rather, they believe that it was merely written down there, but was orally delivered to biblical figures like Job and Abraham beforehand. They use passages like Genesis 26:5, Job 23:12, and Romans 5:12-14 when used in conjunction with 1 John 3:4 to justify this conclusion.

A premillennial eschatology is generally held by Torah-keeping Christians, as they use passages that speak of the Millennial Reign of Christ to show that the Torah will be observed by Christians in the end times.

Gregory Scott McKenzie, a theologian who holds a Doctor of Philosophy degree from Liberty University, postulates that the Euthyphro dilemma can only be considered a false dilemma if the Christian speaker believes in the eternal continuity of the Torah.

== Law-related passages with disputed interpretation ==
The Acts of the Apostles in the New Testament describes a conflict among the first Christians as to the necessity of following all the laws of the Torah to the letter, see also Council of Jerusalem and Incident at Antioch.

Some have interpreted the NRSV's parenthetical statement: "(Thus he declared all foods clean.)" to mean that Jesus taught that the pentateuchal food laws were no longer applicable to his followers, see also Antinomianism in the New Testament. The parenthetical statement is not found in the NRSV's Matthean parallel Matthew 15:15–20 and is a disputed translation, for example, the Scholars Version has: "This is how everything we eat is purified"; Gaus' Unvarnished New Testament has: "purging all that is eaten." See also Strong's G2511.

The disputed word is καθαρός meaning "purity". Gerhard Kittel writes "It is of the essence of NT religion that the older, ritual concept of purity is not merely transcended, but rejected as non-obligatory. Religious and moral purity replaced ritual and cultic." Jesus develops his doctrine of purity in his struggle against Pharisaism and in Matthew 23:25–26 he rejects observance of ritual purity regulations because this kind of purity is merely external. What defiles a person comes from within, from the human heart Mark 7:20–23

Others note that Peter had never eaten anything that was not kosher many years after Acts 2 (Pentecost). To the heavenly vision he announced: "Not so, Lord; for I have never eaten any thing that is common or unclean." Therefore, Peter was unaware that Jesus had changed the Mosaic food laws, implying that Jesus did not change these rules. Later in Acts, Peter realizes the vision is in reference to the gentiles now cleaned through Christ. In Mark 7, Jesus may have been just referring to a tradition of the Pharisees about eating with unwashed hands. The expression "purging all meats" may have meant the digestion and elimination of food from the body rather than the declaration that all foods were kosher. The confusion primarily centers around the participle used in the original Greek for "purging". Some scholars believe it agrees with the word for Jesus, which is nearly 40 words away from the participle. If this is the case, then it would mean that Jesus himself is the one doing the purifying. In New Testament Greek, however, the participle is rarely that far away from the noun it modifies, and many scholars agree that it is far more likely that the participle is modifying the digestive process (literally: the latrine), which is only two words away.

Still others believe a partial list of the commandments was merely an abbreviation that stood for all the commandments because Jesus prefaced his statement to the rich young ruler with the statement: "If you want to enter life, obey the commandments". Some people claim that since Jesus did not qualify his pronouncement, that he meant all the commandments. The rich young ruler asked "which" commandments. Jesus gave him a partial list. The first set of commandments deal with a relationship to God (Hebrew: בין האדם למקום bein ha'adam lamakom). The second set of commandments deal with a relationship to men (Hebrew: בין האדם לאדם bein ha'adam la'adam). No doubt Jesus considered the relationship to God important, but Jesus may have considered that the young man was perhaps lacking in this second set, which made him obligated to men. (This is implied by his statement that to be perfect he should sell his goods, give them to the poor and come and follow Jesus — thereby opening to him a place in the coming Kingdom.)

Several times Paul mentioned adhering to "the Law" and preached about Ten Commandment topics such as "idolatry". See also Law of Christ. Many Christians believe that the Sermon on the Mount is a form of commentary on the Ten Commandments. In the Expounding of the Law, Jesus said that he did not come to abolish the Law, but to fulfill it (e.g. Mathew 5:17–18 "Do not think that I came to destroy the Law or the Prophets. I did not come to destroy but to fulfill. 18 For assuredly, I say to you, till heaven and earth pass away, one jot or one tittle will by no means pass from the law till all is fulfilled); while in Marcion's version of Luke 23:2 we find the extension: "We found this fellow perverting the nation and destroying the law and the prophets". See also Adherence to the Law and Antithesis of the Law.

== History and background ==
=== Hellenism ===
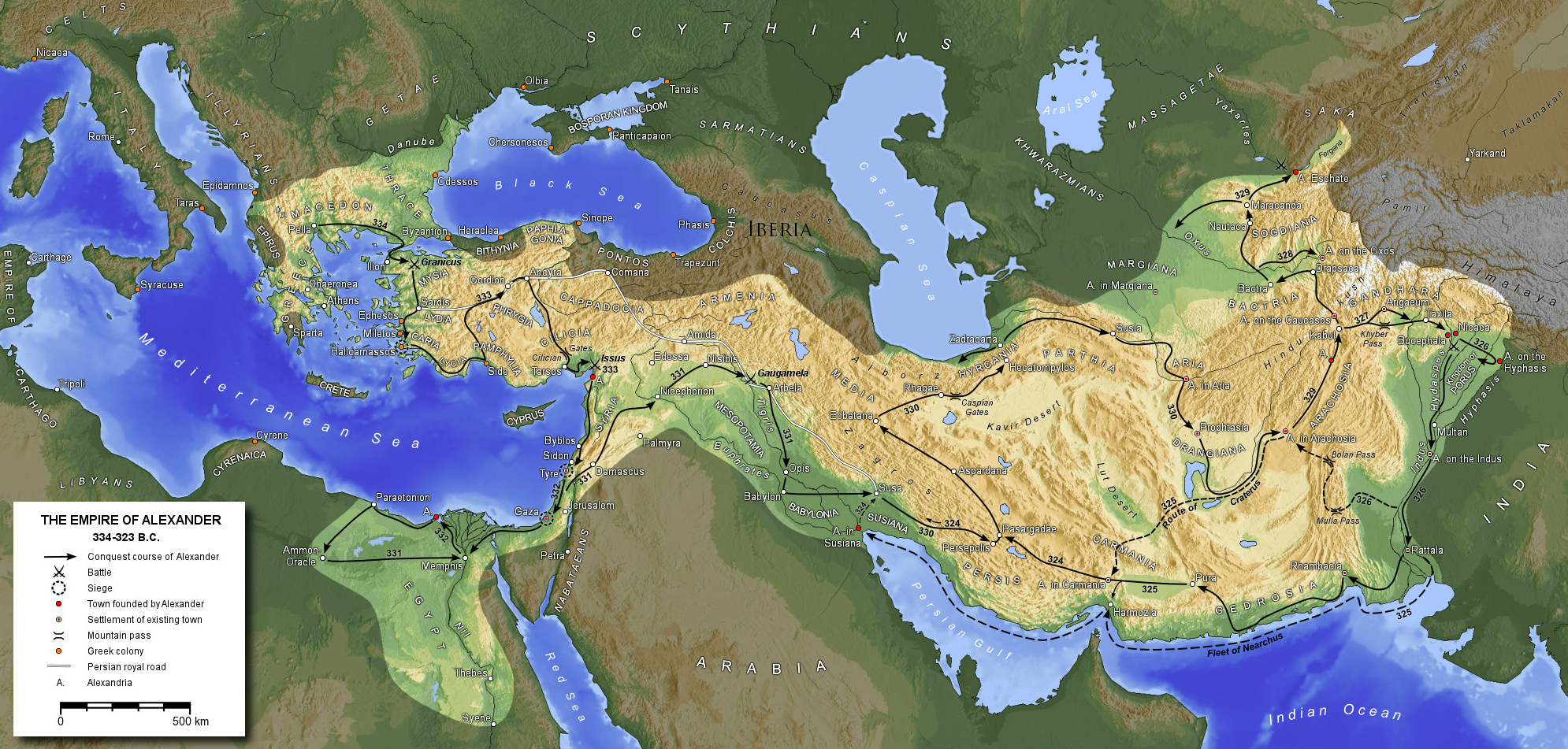
Map of Alexander's empire, c. 334–323 BC

The conquests of Alexander the Great in the late 4th century BC spread Greek culture and colonization over non-Greek lands, including Judea and Galilee, and gave rise to the Hellenistic age, which sought to create a common or universal culture in the Alexandrian or Macedonian Empire based on that of 5th and 4th century BC Athens (see also Age of Pericles), along with a fusion of Near Eastern cultures.

This synthesized Hellenistic culture had a profound impact on the customs and practices of Jews, both in the Land of Israel and in the Diaspora. There was a cultural standoff between the Jewish and Greek cultures. The inroads into Judaism gave rise to Hellenistic Judaism in the Jewish diaspora which attempted to establish the Hebraic-Jewish religious tradition within the culture and language of Hellenism. The major literary product of the movement was the Septuagint and major authors were Philo of Alexandria and Josephus. Some scholars consider Paul of Tarsus a Hellenist as well, see also Paul of Tarsus and Judaism.

There was a general deterioration in relations between hellenized Jews and religious Jews, leading the Seleucid king Antiochus IV Epiphanes to ban certain Jewish religious rites and traditions, his aim being to turn Jerusalem into a Greek polis, to be named Antiochia. Specifically, he decreed the death penalty for anyone who observed the sabbath or practiced circumcision, rededicated the Jewish Temple to Zeus, and forced Jews to eat pork. Consequently, the orthodox Jews revolted against the Greek ruler leading to the formation of an independent Jewish kingdom, known as the Hasmonaean Dynasty, which lasted from 165 BCE to 63 BCE. The Hasmonean Dynasty eventually disintegrated in a civil war. The people, who did not want to continue to be governed by a corrupt and hellenized dynasty, appealed to Rome for intervention, leading to a total Roman conquest and annexation of the country, see Iudaea province.

Nevertheless, the cultural issues remained unresolved. The main issue separating the Hellenistic and orthodox Jews was the application of biblical laws in a Hellenistic (melting pot) culture. One issue was circumcision, which was repulsive to a Greek mind. Some theorize that the early Christians came largely from the group of hellenized Jews who were less attached to Jewish rituals, philosophies and practices. (Note: Jewish Encyclopedia: Saul of Tarsus: Jewish Proselytism and Paul: "As a matter of fact, only the Jewish propaganda work along the Mediterranean Sea made it possible for Paul and his associates to establish Christianity among the Gentiles, as is expressly recorded in the Acts (10:2; 13:16, 13:26, 13:43, 13:50; 16:14; 17:4, 17:17; 18:7); and it is exactly from such synagogue manuals for proselytes as the Didache and the Didascalia that the ethical teachings in the Epistles of Paul and of Peter were derived (see Seeberg, 'Der Katechismus der Urchristenheit', 1903, pp. 1–44).") See also Anti-Judaism.

=== Paul the Apostle and Biblical law ===
Some scholars see Paul the Apostle (or Saul) as completely in line with 1st-century Judaism (a "Pharisee" and student of Gamaliel), others see him as opposed to 1st-century Judaism (see Pauline passages supporting antinomianism and Marcionism), while still others see him as somewhere in between these two extremes, opposed to "Ritual Laws" such as circumcision but in full agreement on "Divine Law".

=== Council of Jerusalem ===
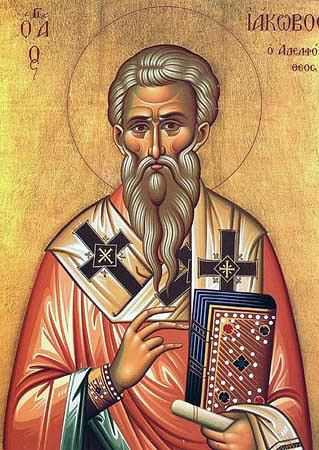
Icon of James the Just, whose judgment was adopted in the Apostolic Decree of Acts 15:19–29, c. 50 AD.

The Council of Jerusalem of about 50 AD was the first meeting in early Christianity called upon to consider the application of Mosaic Law to the new community. Specifically, it had to consider whether new Gentile converts to Christianity were obligated to undergo circumcision for full membership in the Christian community, but it was conscious that the issue had wider implications, since circumcision is the "everlasting" sign of the Abrahamic Covenant.

Modern differences over the interpretation of this come from the understanding of the use of the word "Law" in Paul's writings (example: Gal 3:10) as referring only to Mosaic Law (Torah) but in 1st century Hebrew understanding had multiple meanings which also included Jewish and Roman civil laws.

At the time, the Christian community would have considered itself a part of the wider Jewish community, with most of the leaders of the Church being Jewish or Jewish proselytes.

The decision of the Council came to be called the Apostolic Decree and was that most Mosaic law, (Note: Jewish law or Halakha was formalized later, see Jewish Encyclopedia: Jesus of Nazareth: Attitude Toward the Law: "Jesus, however, does not appear to have taken into account the fact that the Halakah was at this period just becoming crystallized, and that much variation existed as to its definite form; the disputes of the Bet Hillel and Bet Shammai were occurring about the time of his maturity.") including the requirement for circumcision of males, was not obligatory for Gentile converts, possibly in order to make it easier for them to join the movement. However, the Council did retain the prohibitions against eating meat containing "blood", or meat of animals not properly slain, and against "fornication" and "idol worship". Beginning with Augustine of Hippo, many have seen a connection to Noahide Law, while some modern scholars reject the connection to Noahide Law and instead see Lev 17-18 as the basis. See also Old Testament Law applicable to converts and Leviticus 18.

Noted in Acts 15:19-21, James tells the Jewish believers to understand his reasoning for writing letters to Gentile believers when he says, "For Moses has been preached in every city from the earliest times and is read in the synagogues on every Sabbath." Knowing the new converts would have to attend a synagogue in order to learn the history of Israel and the Church, James set the Gentile believers up with a beginning attitude of precaution towards those who would preach Moses' Law as a requirement for Gentile believers.

The Apostolic Decree may be a major act of differentiation of the Church from its Jewish roots, the first being the Rejection of Jesus.

Although the outcome is consistent with the Jewish view on the applicability of Mosaic Law to non-Jews, the Apostolic Decree created a category of persons who were members of the Christian community (which still considered itself to be part of the Jewish community) who were not considered to be full converts by the wider Jewish community. In the wider Jewish community, these partial converts were welcomed (a common term for them being God-fearers, similar to the modern movement of B'nei Noah, see dual-covenant theology), but they as Gentiles were excluded from the Temple proper and certain rituals.

This created problems, especially when the Christian community had become dominated by former Gentiles with less understanding of the reasons for the dispute.

=== Marcion ===
In the middle of the second century, bishop Marcion proposed rejecting the entire Jewish Bible, indeed he considered the God portrayed there to be a lesser deity, a demiurge. His position however was strongly rejected by Proto-orthodox Christianity, notably Tertullian and Irenaeus. The terms Old Testament and New Testament are traditionally ascribed to Tertullian, but some scholars instead propose Marcion as the source while other scholars propose that Melito of Sardis coined the phrase Old Testament.

=== Johannes Agricola ===
In 1525, Johannes Agricola advanced the doctrine that the Law was no longer needed by regenerate Christians. This position however was strongly rejected by Luther and in the Formula of Concord as antinomianism.

=== John Locke ===
In A Letter Concerning Toleration (1689), the philosopher John Locke argued that legal commands in the law of Moses were historically binding only on ancient Israel and did not obligate Christians. He emphasized that the Mosaic Law was addressed to a specific people, a limitation reflected in its biblical framing, and therefore could not serve as a universal legal standard. Locke rejected attempts to justify civil punishment for religious offenses by appealing to Mosaic legislation.

=== Leo Tolstoy ===
In 1894, Leo Tolstoy published The Kingdom of God Is Within You, in which he advanced the doctrine that Jesus' Sermon on the Mount, including its Antithesis of the Law, was the true message of Jesus. Although Tolstoy never actually used the term "Christian anarchism", reviews of his book appear to have coined the term.

=== Recent scholarship ===
Recent scholars who have been influential in the debate regarding the law include F. F. Bruce, Rudolf Bultmann, Heikki Räisänen, Klyne Snodgrass, C. E. B. Cranfield, and others, as well as some of those involved with the New Perspectives movement.

In 1993, Zondervan published The Law, the Gospel, and the Modern Christian: Five Views (and apparently republished it as Five Views on Law and Gospel) in which its authors presented and debated five modern Protestant views on the topic. Willem A. VanGemeren presented a non-theonomic Reformed view, Greg L. Bahnsen presented the theonomic Reformed view, Walter C. Kaiser Jr. presented his own view, Wayne G. Strickland presented his own Dispensational view, and Douglas J. Moo presented what he calls a modified Lutheran view but is in all but name a New Covenant Theology approach.

== See also ==
- Abrogation of Old Covenant laws
- Hebrew Bible
- Old Testament
- Tanakh
- Torah
- 613 mitzvot
- Halakha
- Letter to the Hebrews
- Ten Commandments
- Sermon on the Mount
  - Expounding of the Law
  - The Law of Christ
- Law and Gospel
- Free Grace theology
- Covenant (biblical)
  - New Covenant
- New Testament
- Judaizers
- Philosemitism
- Messianic Judaism
- Christian Torah-submission
- Christianity and Judaism
- Christian Zionism
- Christian observances of Jewish holidays
- Sabbath in Christianity
- Circumcision in the Bible
- Legalism (theology)
- Canon law
- People of God
- Split of Christianity and Judaism
- Pronomianism
