= Council of Jerusalem =

First Christian synod (c. 48–50 AD)

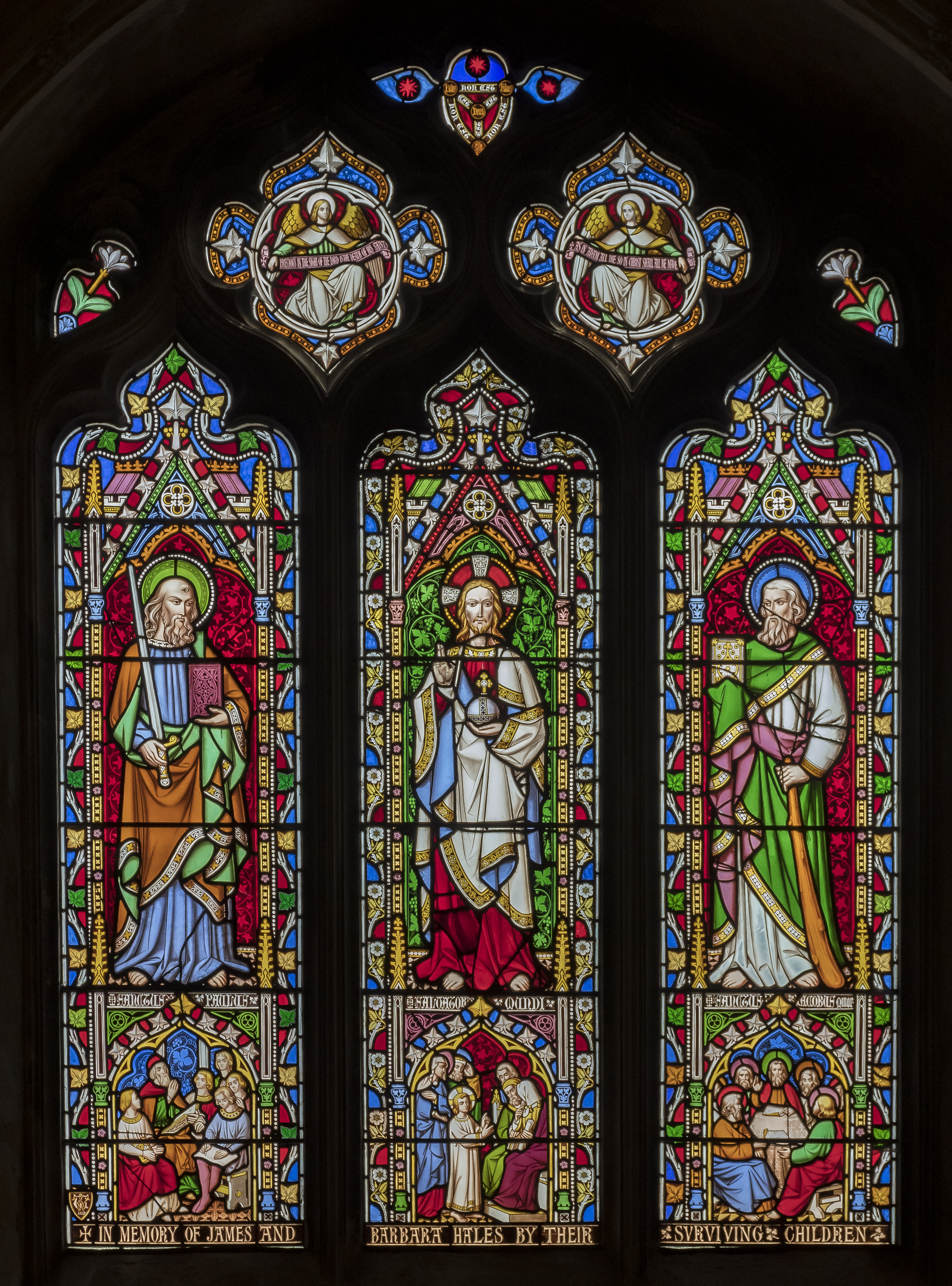
- Stained glass window at Norwich Cathedral with Saint Paul, Jesus and James the Less. The lower right image shows the Council of Jerusalem.
- Date: c. 48–50 AD
- Accepted by: Most mainstream Christian denominations
- Next council: Ancient church councils and First Council of Nicaea
- President: Unspecified, presumably James (brother of Jesus), Peter, and John
- Topics: Controversy about male circumcision, Christian views on the Old Covenant, whether keeping the Mosaic Law is necessary for the salvation of Gentiles
- Documents and statements: Excerpts from New Testament (Acts of Apostles and perhaps Epistle to the Galatians)

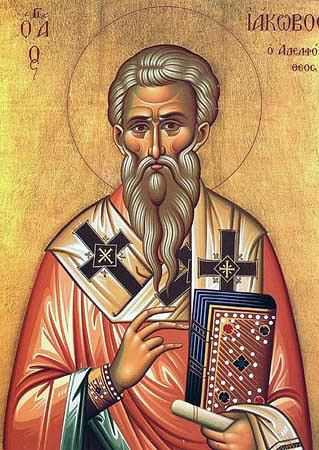
James the Just, whose judgment was adopted in the Apostolic Decree of Acts 15:19–29, c. 78 AD: "we should write to them [Gentiles] to abstain only from things polluted by idols and from fornication and from whatever has been strangled and from blood..." (NRSV)

The Council of Jerusalem or Apostolic Council is a council described in chapter 15 of the Acts of the Apostles, held in Jerusalem c. AD 48–50. Scholars increasingly affirm the Jerusalem Council and its rulings as a historical event.

According to Acts, the council addressed whether Gentile converts were required to be circumcised and observe Mosaic Law. The council decided that Gentiles were not required to be circumcised or keep the law of Moses, while instructing them to abstain from food associated with idols, from blood and meat from strangled animals, and from porneia, often translated as fornication or sexual immorality. These instructions are commonly known as the Apostolic Decree. The purpose, scope, and origin of the decree are debated. The decree itself "has been obsolete for centuries in the West", according to the 19th-century German Catholic bishop Karl Josef von Hefele.

Accounts of the council are found in Acts of the Apostles, chapter 15, in both the Alexandrian and Western textual traditions. The council may also be referred to in Paul's letter to the Galatians, chapter 2, although scholars disagree about whether Galatians 2 describes the same event as Acts 15.

== Historical background ==
Jerusalem was the first center of the Christian Church according to the Book of Acts and (according to the Catholic Encyclopedia) the location of "the first Christian church". The apostles lived and taught there for some time after Pentecost. James the Just, brother of Jesus was leader of the early Christian community in Jerusalem, and his other kinsmen likely held leadership positions in the surrounding area after the destruction of the city until its rebuilding as Aelia Capitolina in c. AD 130, when all Jews were banished from Jerusalem.

The apostles Barnabas and Paul went to Jerusalem to meet with the "Pillars of the Church": James the Just, Peter, and John. The Council of Jerusalem is generally dated to c. AD 48-50, roughly 15 to 25 years after the crucifixion of Jesus (between AD 26 and 36). Acts 15 and Galatians 2 both suggest that the meeting was called to debate the legitimacy of the evangelizing mission of Barnabas and Paul to the Gentiles and the Gentile converts' freedom from most of the Mosaic Law, especially from the circumcision of males, a practice that was considered execrable and repulsive in the Greco-Roman world during the period of Hellenization of the Eastern Mediterranean, and was especially disdained by both ancient Greeks and Romans, who instead valued the foreskin positively.

At the time, most followers of Jesus (which historians refer to as Jewish Christians) were Jewish by birth and even converts would have considered the early Christians as a part of Judaism. According to scholars, the Jewish Christians affirmed every aspect of the contemporary Second Temple Judaism with the addition of the belief that Jesus was the Jewish Messiah.

== Issues and outcome ==
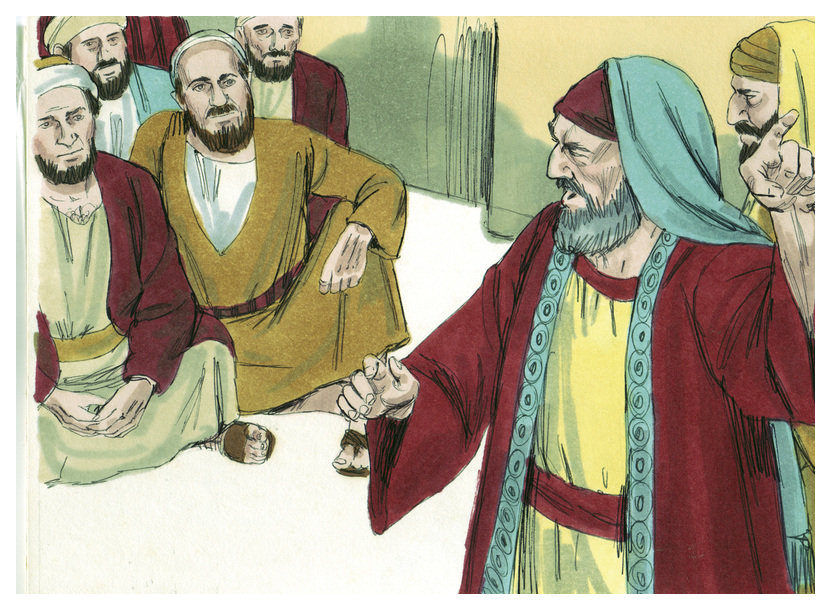
The apostles dispute at the Council (Jim Padgett, 1984)

The purpose of the meeting, according to Acts, was to resolve a disagreement in Antioch, which had wider implications than just circumcision, since circumcision is considered the "everlasting" sign of the Abrahamic covenant in Judaism (Genesis 17:9–14). The Acts say that "certain men which came down from Judaea" were preaching that "[u]nless you are circumcised according to the custom of Moses, you cannot be saved"; Acts states that furthermore some of the Pharisees who had become believers stated that it was "needful to circumcise [the Gentiles,] and to command [them] to keep the law of Moses" (KJV).

The primary issue which was addressed related to the requirement of circumcision, as the author of Acts relates, but other important matters arose as well, as the Apostolic Decree indicates. The dispute was between those such as the followers of the "Pillars of the Church", led by James, who believed that the church must observe the Torah (i.e. the rules of traditional Judaism (Galatians 2:12)), and Paul the Apostle, who called himself "Apostle to the Gentiles", who believed there was no such necessity. The main concern for Paul, which he subsequently expressed in greater detail with his letters directed to the early Christian communities in Asia Minor, was the inclusion of Gentiles into God's New Covenant, sending the message that faith in Christ is sufficient for salvation.

At the council, following advice offered by Peter (Acts 15:7–11 and Acts 15:14), Barnabas and Paul gave an account of their ministry among the gentiles (Acts 15:12), and James quoted from the words of the prophet Amos (Acts 15:16–17, quoting Amos 9:11–12). James added his own words to the quotation: "Known to God from eternity are all His works" and then submitted a proposal, which was accepted by the Church and became known as the Apostolic Decree:

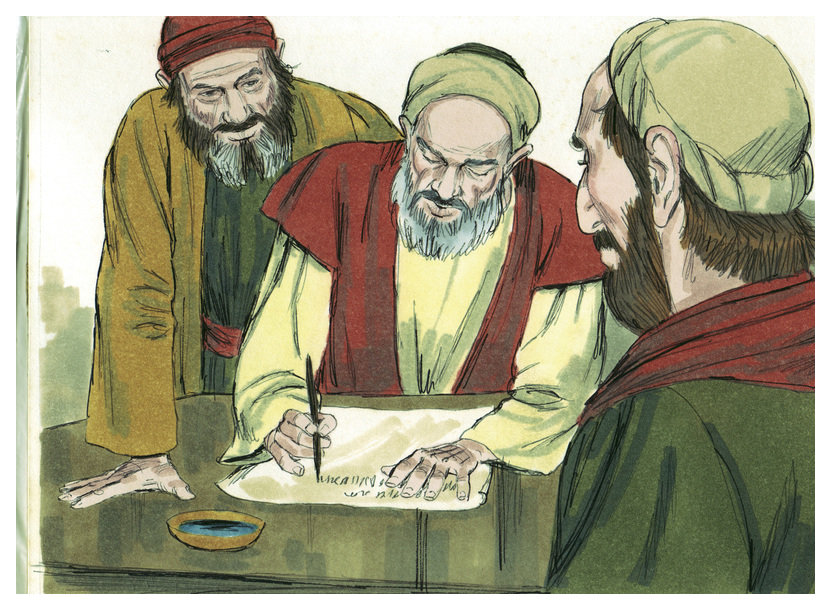
The letter to the Gentiles is composed (Jim Padgett, 1984)

It is my judgment, therefore, that we should not make it difficult for the Gentiles who are turning to God. Instead we should write to them, telling them to abstain from food polluted by idols, from sexual immorality, from the meat of strangled animals and from blood. For the law of Moses has been preached in every city from the earliest times and is read in the synagogues on every Sabbath.

— Acts 15:19–21

Acts 15:23–29 sets out the content of the letter written in accordance with James' proposal. The Western version of Acts (see Acts of the Apostles: Manuscripts) adds the negative form of the Golden Rule ("and whatever things ye would not have done to yourselves, do not do to another").

The Decree addressed more than circumcision, particularly dietary questions, fornication, idolatry, and blood, as well as the application of Biblical law to non-Jews. At the Council, the apostles and elders declared: "the Holy Spirit and we ourselves have favored adding no further burden to you, except these necessary things, to abstain from things sacrificed to idols, and from blood, and from things strangled, and from fornication. If you carefully keep yourselves from these things, you will prosper." (Acts 15:27–28) The Apostolic Decree was binding on Christian congregations in other regions.

== Historicity ==
The description of the Apostolic Council in Acts 15 is generally considered the same event described in Galatians 2. Recent scholarship inclines towards treating the Jerusalem Council and its rulings as a historical event. Some scholars in the mid to late 20th century were skeptical of the event. An overwhelming majority identifies the reference to the Jerusalem Council in Acts 15 with Paul's account in Gal. 2.1–10, and this accord is not just limited to the historicity of the gathering alone but extends also to the authenticity of the arguments deriving from the Jerusalem church itself, though this is sometimes expressed with caution. Bruce Metzger's Textual Commentary on the Greek New Testament includes a summary of current research on the topic as of about 1994:

In conclusion, therefore, it appears that the least unsatisfactory solution of the complicated textual and exegetical problems of the Apostolic Decree is to regard the fourfold decree as original (foods offered to idols, strangled meat, eating blood, and unchastity—whether ritual or moral), and to explain the two forms of the threefold decree in some such way as those suggested above. An extensive literature exists on the text and exegesis of the Apostolic Decree. ... According to Jacques Dupont, "Present day scholarship is practically unanimous in considering the 'Eastern' text of the decree as the only authentic text (in four items) and in interpreting its prescriptions in a sense not ethical but ritual" [Les problèmes du Livre des Actes d'après les travaux récents (Louvain, 1950), p.70].

== Origin of the Council's decision ==
The Council of Jerusalem retained the prohibitions on eating blood, meat containing blood, and meat of animals that were strangled, and on fornication and idolatry. The resulting Apostolic Decree in Acts 15 may simply parallel the seven Noahide laws found in the Old Testament, and thus be a commonality rather than a differential. However, modern scholars dispute the connection between Acts 15 and the seven Noahide laws. The Apostolic Decree may have been a major act of differentiation of the early Church from its Jewish roots.

The Jewish Encyclopedia states:

For great as was the success of Barnabas and Paul in the heathen world, the authorities in Jerusalem insisted upon circumcision as the condition of admission of members into the church, until, on the initiative of Peter, and of James, the head of the Jerusalem church, it was agreed that acceptance of the Noachian Laws—namely, regarding avoidance of idolatry, fornication, and the eating of flesh cut from a living animal—should be demanded of the heathen desirous of entering the Church.

The Jewish Encyclopedia also states:

R. Emden [...] gives it as his opinion that the original intention of Jesus, and especially of Paul, was to convert only the Gentiles to the seven moral laws of Noah and to let the Jews follow the Mosaic law—which explains the apparent contradictions in the New Testament regarding the laws of Moses and the Sabbath.

The 20th-century American Catholic priest and biblical scholar Joseph A. Fitzmyer SJ disputes the claim that the Apostolic Decree is based on the seven Noahide laws (Gen 9), and instead proposes Lev 17–18 as the basis for it. (See also: Leviticus 18).

== Obsolescence ==
While the prohibitions of the Apostolic Decree were reiterated in the Apostolic Canons and at the Council in Trullo in 692, it "has been obsolete for centuries in the West", according to the 19th-century German Catholic bishop Karl Josef von Hefele, though it is still nominally recognized and observed by Eastern Orthodox Christians.

The apostolic decree was defined by the Council of Florence to have been obsolete when the distinction between Jewish and gentile converts had disappeared:

[The council] also declares that the apostolic prohibition, to abstain from what has been sacrificed to idols and from blood and from what is strangled, was suited to that time when a single church was rising from Jews and gentiles, who previously lived with different ceremonies and customs. This was so that the gentiles should have some observances in common with Jews, and occasion would be offered of coming together in one worship and faith of God and a cause of dissension might be removed, since by ancient custom blood and strangled things seemed abominable to Jews, and gentiles could be thought to be returning to idolatry if they ate sacrificial food. In places, however, where the Christian religion has been promulgated to such an extent that no Jew is to be met with and all have joined the church, uniformly practicing the same rites and ceremonies of the gospel and believing that to the clean all things are clean, since the cause of that apostolic prohibition has ceased, so its effect has ceased.

— Bull of Union with the Copts, 1442

This reasoning was repeated in Pope Urban VIII's Creed for Oriental converts of 1642 and Pope Benedict XIV's encyclical Ex Quo of 1756.

== See also ==
- Ancient church councils (pre-ecumenical)
- Binding and loosing
- Christian ethics
- Circumcision controversy in early Christianity
- Circumcision in the Bible
- Incident at Antioch
- Jewish Christians
- Judaizers
- Legalism (theology)
- New Perspective on Paul
