= Dual-covenant theology =

School of thought in Christianity

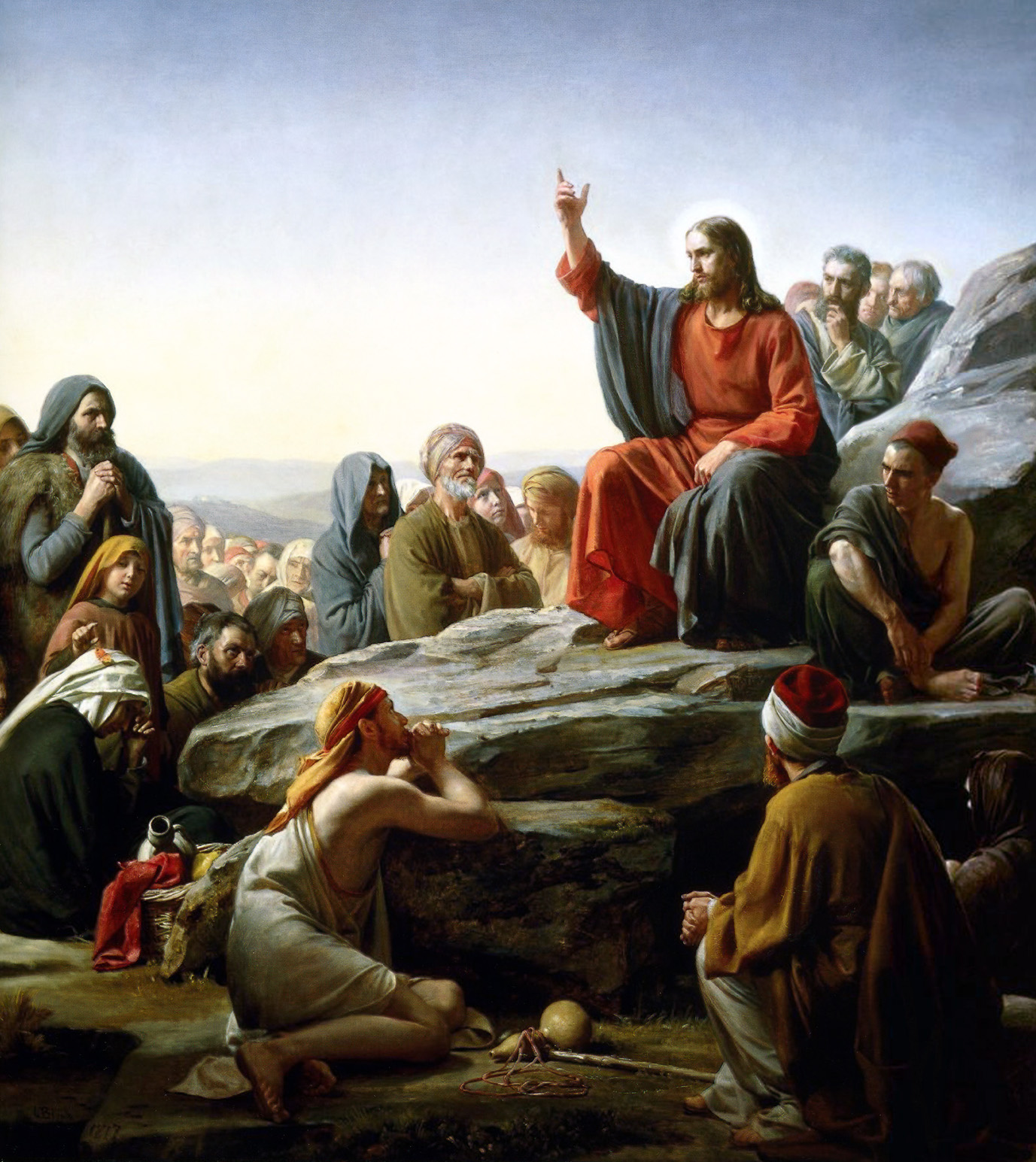
Christians consider Jesus to be the mediator of the New Covenant. Depicted is his famous Sermon on the Mount in which he commented on the Old Covenant.

Dual-covenant or two-covenant theology is a school of thought in Christian theology regarding the relevance of the Hebrew Bible, which Christians call the Old Testament.

Some Christians hold that the Old Testament has been superseded by the New Covenant; a minority hold that the Mosaic covenant has been abrogated.

Dual-covenant theology instead holds that the Mosaic covenant remains valid for Jews while only the New Covenant applies to non-Jews or gentiles.

== Background ==
Judaism maintains that in the post-flood era there is a universally binding covenant between God and man in the form of the Seven Laws of Noah and that there is additionally a unique Sinaitic covenant that was made between God and the Hebrews at biblical Mount Sinai. However Judaism has not historically maintained that there is a separate covenant for gentiles wherein they should convert to Christianity. Indeed from the Maimonidean perspective, belief in the divinity of Jesus would be a breach of Noahide Law.

The 18th-century rabbinic thinker Yaakov Emden has even opined:

the original intention of Jesus, and especially of Paul, was to convert only the Gentiles to the seven moral laws of Noah and to let the Jews follow the Mosaic law—which explains the apparent contradictions in the New Testament regarding the laws of Moses and the Sabbath.

Later, in the 20th century, the unorthodox Jewish theologian Franz Rosenzweig, consequent to his flirtations with Christianity, advanced the idea in his work the Star of Redemption that "Christianity acknowledges the God of the Jews, not as God but as 'the Father of Jesus Christ.' Christianity itself cleaves to the 'Lord' because it knows that the Father can be reached only through him ... We are all wholly agreed as to what Christ and his church mean to the world: no one can reach the Father save through him. No one can reach the Father! But the situation is quite different for one who does not have to reach the Father because he is already with him. And this is true of the people of Israel."

Daniel Goldhagen, former Associate Professor of Political Science at Harvard University, also suggested in his book A Moral Reckoning that the Roman Catholic Church should change its doctrine and the Biblical canon to excise statements he labels as antisemitic, to indicate that "The Jews' way to God is as legitimate as the Christian way".

== Messianic Judaism ==
David H. Stern, a Messianic Jewish theologian, wrote that dual-covenant theology is said to originate with Maimonides. It was proffered in the 20th century by the Jewish philosopher Franz Rosenzweig, and was elaborated upon by such theologians as Reinhold Niebuhr and James Parkes.

These founders believe that Jesus' message is not for Jews but for Gentiles and, that John 14:6 is to be understood thusly: "I am the way, the truth and the life; and no Gentile comes to the father except through me." Stern asserts that the problem of dual-covenant theology is that "replacing Yeshua's 'No one comes to the Father except through me' with 'No Gentile comes...' does unacceptable violence to the plain sense of the text and to the whole New Testament."

== Apostolic Decree ==
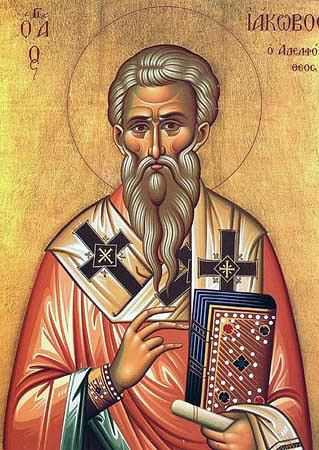
James the Just, whose judgment was adopted in the Apostolic Decree of Acts 15:19–29, c. 50 AD: "we should write to them [Gentiles] to abstain only from things polluted by idols and from fornication and from whatever has been strangled and from blood" (NRSV)

The Apostolic Decree in the Book of Acts (15:19–29) has been commonly interpreted as a parallel to Noahide Law.

Although the Apostolic Decree is no longer observed by many Christian denominations today, it is still observed in full by the Greek Orthodox.

== Catholic Church ==
Traditional supersessionist theology, as exemplified in Pope Eugene IV's papal bull, which he published at the Council of Florence in 1442 (1441 according to the contemporary Florentine calendar):

The Holy Roman Church ... firmly believes, professes and teaches that the matter pertaining to the law of the Old Testament, of the Mosaic law, which are divided into ceremonies, sacred rites, sacrifices, and sacraments, because they were established to signify something in the future, although they were suited to the divine worship at that time, after our Lord's coming had been signified by them, ceased, and the sacraments of the New Testament began; ... after the promulgation of the Gospel it asserts that they cannot be observed without the loss of eternal salvation. All, therefore, who after that time observe circumcision and the Sabbath and the other requirements of the law, the holy Roman Church declares alien to the Christian faith and not in the least fit to participate in eternal salvation.

John Paul II supported greater dialogue between Catholics and Jews, but did not support dual-covenant theology. On November 17, 1980, John Paul II delivered a speech to the Jews of Berlin in which he discussed his views of Catholic–Jewish relations. During the speech, John Paul II cited Nostra Aetate, claiming that Catholics "will endeavor to understand better all that in the Old Testament maintains its own enduring value ..., since this value has not been obliterated by the further interpretation of the New Testament, which on the contrary gave the Older its most complete meaning, so that the New one receives from the Old light and explanation."

== Criticism ==
=== Catholic ===
Cardinal Avery Dulles was critical of dual-covenant theology, especially as understood in the USCCB's document Reflections on Covenant and Mission. In the article All in the Family: Christians, Jews and God, evidence has also been compiled from Scripture, the Church Fathers and official Church documents that the Catholic Church does not support dual covenant theology.

Though it is to be removed from the next edition (at order of the Vatican, as misrepresenting the editio typica) the United States Catholic Catechism for Adults (2006) states:

The covenant that God made with the Jewish people through Moses remains eternally valid for them.

In June 2008 the bishops decided by a vote of 231–14 to remove this from the next printing of the Catechism, because it could be construed to mean that Jews have their own path to salvation and do not need Christ or the Church. In August 2009, the Vatican approved the change, and the revised text states (in conformity with the editio typica):

To the Jewish people, whom God first chose to hear his Word, 'belong the sonship, the glory, the covenants, the giving of the law, the worship and the promises; to them belong the patriarchs, and of their race, according to the flesh, is the Christ.'

=== Protestant ===
In 2006, Evangelical Protestant Jerry Falwell denied a report in The Jerusalem Post that he supported dual-covenant theology:

I have been on record all 54 years of my ministry as being opposed to dual covenant theology… I simply cannot alter my deeply held belief in the exclusivity of salvation through the Gospel of Christ for the sake of political or theological expediency. Like the Apostle Paul, I pray daily for the salvation of everyone, including the Jewish people.

== See also ==
- Christian views on the Old Covenant
- Christian Zionism
- Christian–Jewish reconciliation
- Circumcision controversy in early Christianity
- Extra Ecclesiam nulla salus
- Gamaliel
- John Hagee
- Hebrew Catholics
- Hebrew Roots
- Jewish Christian
- Noahidism
- Solus Christus
- Two House theology
