= Circumcision controversy in early Christianity =

The circumcision controversy in early Christianity played an important role in Christian theology.

The circumcision of Jesus is celebrated as a feast day in the liturgical calendar of many Christian denominations, while the teachings of the Apostle Paul asserted that physical circumcision was unnecessary for the salvation of Gentiles and their membership in the New Covenant. The first Council of Jerusalem (c. 50) declared that circumcision was not necessary for new Gentile converts (as recorded in Acts 15); Pauline Christianity was instrumental in the split of early Christianity and Judaism and eventually became Christians' predominant position. Covenant theology largely views the Christian sacrament of baptism as fulfilling the Jewish practice of circumcision, as both serve as signs and seals of the covenant of grace.

While historically circumcision is not observed by the majority of Christians in most parts of the Christian world, and mainstream Christian denominations neither require it for religious observance nor forbid it for medical or cultural reasons, it is practiced among some Christian countries and communities. Some Oriental Christian denominations retained the practice, as part of a rite of passage. According to scholar Heather L. Armstrong of University of Southampton, about half of Christian males worldwide are circumcised, with most of them being located in Africa, Anglosphere countries (with notable prevalence in the United States) and the Philippines.

== Background ==
There are numerous references in the Hebrew Bible to the obligation for circumcision and the uncircumcised are to be cut off from the people in Genesis 17:14.

During the 1st century BC, there was a controversy in Judaism relating to whether or not a proselyte who was already circumcised needed to be ritually re-circumcised. This is done via a pinprick creating a drop of blood and is still practiced to this day.

A similar controversy between the Shammaites and the Hillelites is given (Shab. 137a) regarding a proselyte born circumcised: the former demanding the spilling of a drop of blood of the covenant; the latter declaring it to be unnecessary. The rigorous Shammaite view, voiced in the Book of Jubilees (l.c.["in the place cited"]), prevailed in the time of King John Hyrcanus, who forced the Abrahamic rite upon the Idumeans, and in that of King Aristobulus, who made the Itureans undergo circumcision (Josephus, Antiquities of the Jews, xiii. 9, § 1; 11, § 3). According to Esther 8:17, Septuagint, the Persians who, from fear of the Jews after Haman's defeat, "became Jews," were circumcised.

== 1st and 2nd century AD Judaism ==
Jewish sources vary on whether or not circumcision of proselytes was a universal practice in tannaitic times.

The issue between the Zealot and Liberal parties regarding the circumcision of proselytes remained an open one in tannaitic times

The disagreement centers on the correctness of contradictory passages in the Babylonian Talmud and Jerusalem Talmud and which passage is older. B. Yevamot 46a is summarized as follows:

Rabbi Joshua says that if a proselyte is immersed but not circumcised this is valid. Because our mothers were immersed but not circumcised. Rabbi Eliezer says the opposite. Because such was found regarding our fathers. However the sages say both are required.

P. Kiddushin 3:12 (3:14, 64d) is summarized as follows:

Rabbi Eliezer says only circumcision is required the same as in B. Yevamot 46a. Rabbi Joshua says both are required.

During tannaitic times uncircumcised semi-converts also existed, see God-fearer and Ger toshav.

== Circumcision of Jesus ==
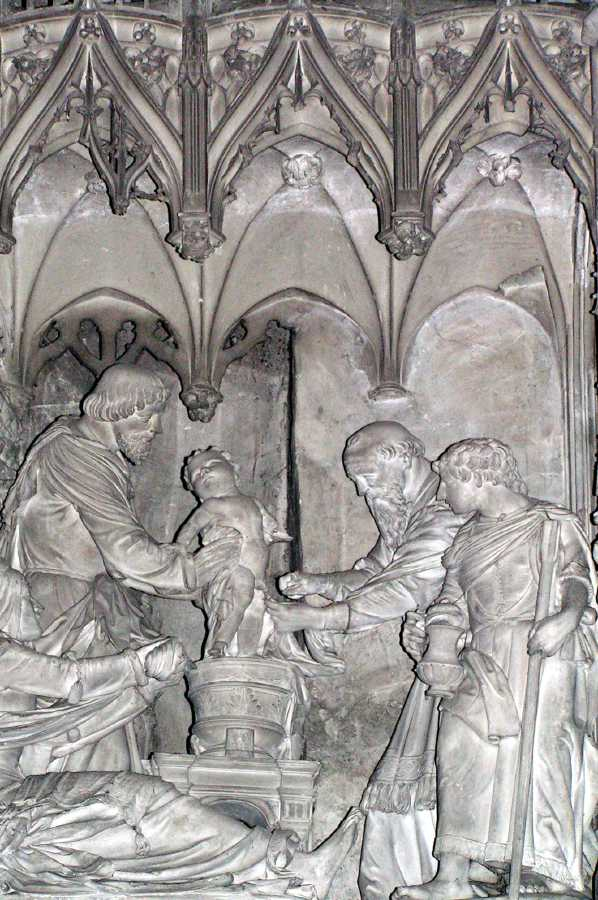
Circumcision of Jesus, sculpture in the Cathedral of Chartres

According to the Gospel of Luke, Jesus was circumcised eight days after his birth, in accordance with Mosaic Law.

== Mosaic Law in Early Christianity ==
Similar differences and disputes existed within early Christianity, but disputes within Christianity extended also to the place of Mosaic Law or Old Covenant in general in Christianity. This is particularly notable in the mid-1st century, when the circumcision controversy came to the fore. Alister McGrath, an intellectual historian and proponent of paleo-orthodoxy, claims that many of the Jewish Christians were fully faithful religious Jews, only differing in their acceptance of Jesus as the Jewish Messiah. As such, they tended to be of the view that circumcision and other requirements of the Mosaic Law were required for salvation. Those in the Christian community who insisted that biblical law, including laws on circumcision, continued to apply to Christians were pejoratively labeled Judaizers by their opponents and criticized as being elitist and legalistic.

=== Council of Jerusalem ===
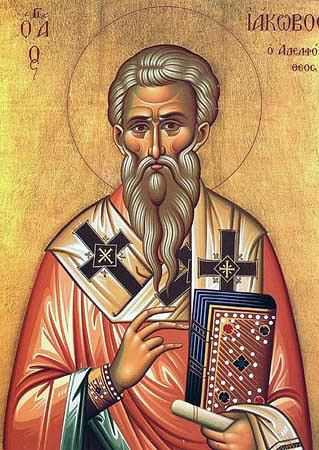
James the Just, whose judgment was adopted in the Apostolic Decree of Acts 15:19–29, c. 78 AD: "we should write to them [Gentiles] to abstain only from things polluted by idols and from fornication and from whatever has been strangled and from blood..." (NRSV)

Jerusalem was the first center of the Christian Church according to the Book of Acts, The apostles lived and taught there for some time after Pentecost. James the Just, brother of Jesus was leader of the early Christian community in Jerusalem, and his other kinsmen likely held leadership positions in the surrounding area after the destruction of the city until its rebuilding as Aelia Capitolina in c. 130 AD, when all Jews were banished from Jerusalem.

In c. 48–50 AD, Barnabas and Paul went to Jerusalem to meet with the "Pillars of the Church": James the Just, Peter, and John. Later called the Council of Jerusalem, according to Pauline Christians, this meeting (among other things) confirmed the legitimacy of the Evangelizing mission of Barnabas and Paul to the Gentiles and the Gentile converts' freedom from most of the Mosaic Law, especially from the circumcision of males, a practice that was considered execrable and repulsive in the Greco-Roman world during the period of Hellenization of the Eastern Mediterranean, and was especially adversed in Classical civilization both from ancient Greeks and Romans, which instead valued the foreskin positively.

The primary issue which was addressed related to the requirement of circumcision, as the author of Acts relates, but other important matters arose as well, as the Apostolic Decree indicates. The dispute was between those, such as the followers of the "Pillars of the Church", led by James, who believed, following his interpretation of the Great Commission, that the church must observe the Torah, i.e. the rules of traditional Judaism, and Paul the Apostle, who called himself "Apostle to the Gentiles", who believed there was no such necessity. The main concern for the Apostle Paul, which he subsequently expressed in greater detail with his letters directed to the early Christian communities in Asia Minor, was the inclusion of Gentiles into God's New Covenant, sending the message that faith in Christ is sufficient for salvation. (See also: Supersessionism, New Covenant, Antinomianism, Hellenistic Judaism, and Paul the Apostle and Judaism).

The decision of the Council did retain the prohibitions against eating meat containing blood, or meat of animals not properly slain, and against "fornication" and "idol worship". The resulting Apostolic Decree in Acts 15 may simply parallel the seven Noahide laws found in the Old Testament, and thus be a commonality rather than a differential. However, modern scholars dispute the connection between Acts 15 and the seven Noahide laws. In roughly the same time period, rabbinic Jewish legal authorities made their circumcision requirement for Jewish boys even stricter.

=== Teachings of Paul ===
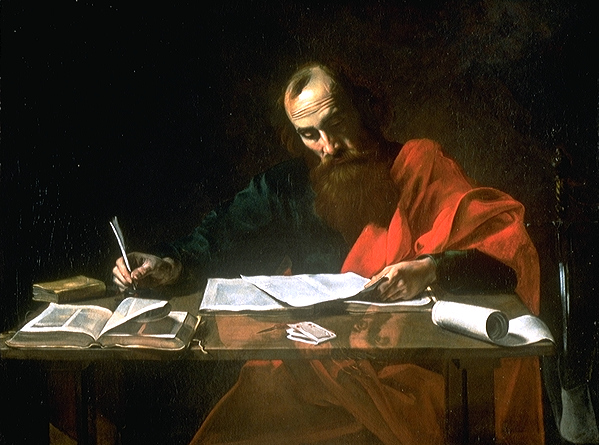
Artist depiction of Saint Paul Writing His Epistles, 16th century (Blaffer Foundation Collection, Houston, Texas). Most scholars think Paul actually dictated his letters to a secretary.

While the issue was theoretically resolved, it continued to be a recurring issue among the early Christian communities. After the Council of Jerusalem, Paul wrote to the Galatians about the issue, which had become a serious controversy in their region. There was a burgeoning movement of Judaizers in the area that advocated strict adherence to traditional Jewish laws and customs, including circumcision for male converts. According to McGrath, Paul identified James the Just as the motivating force behind the movement. Paul considered it a great threat to his doctrine of salvation through faith and addressed the issue with great detail in Galatians 3.

According to the Acts of the Apostles, chapter 15, the Jewish Christian leaders of the early Church at the Council of Jerusalem rejected circumcision as a requirement for Gentile converts, possibly the first act of differentiation of Early Christianity from its Jewish roots (See also: List of events in early Christianity). The rite of circumcision was especially execrable in Classical civilization because it was the custom to spend an hour a day or so exercising nude in the gymnasium and in Roman baths, therefore Jewish men did not want to be seen in public deprived of their foreskins. Hellenistic and Roman culture both found circumcision to be cruel and repulsive.

Paul the Apostle, who called himself "Apostle to the Gentiles", attacked the practice but not consistently; for example, in one case he personally circumcised Timothy "because of the Jews" that were in town (Timothy had a Jewish Christian mother but a Greek father Acts 16:1–3). The 19th-century American Catholic priest and biblical scholar Florentine Bechtel SJ noted in the Catholic Encyclopedia entry on Judaizers (1910):

Paul, on the other hand, not only did not object to the observance of the Mosaic Law, as long as it did not interfere with the liberty of the Gentiles, but he conformed to its prescriptions when occasion required (1 Corinthians 9:20). Thus he shortly after circumcised Timothy (Acts 16:1–16:3), and he was in the very act of observing the Mosaic ritual when he was arrested at Jerusalem (Acts 21:26).

He also appeared to praise its value in Romans 3:1–2, hence the topic of Paul the Apostle and Judaism is still debated.

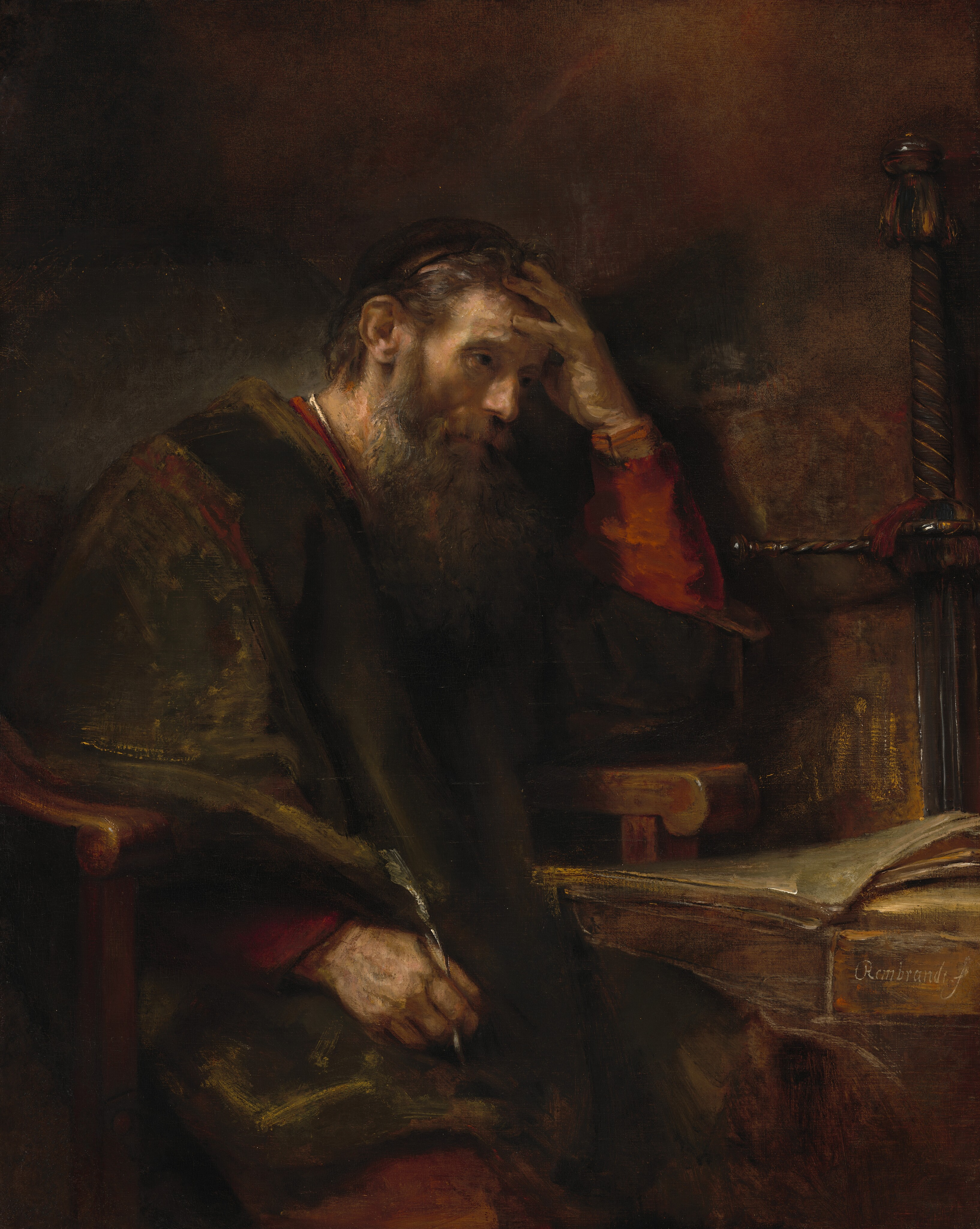
Rembrandt: The Apostle Paul, circa 1657 (National Gallery of Art, Washington, D.C.)

Paul argued that circumcision no longer meant the physical, but a spiritual practice (Rom 2:25–29). And in that sense, he wrote 1 Cor 7:18: "Is any man called being circumcised? let him not become uncircumcised"—probably a reference to the practice of epispasm. Paul was already circumcised ("on the eighth day", Phil 3:4–5) when he was "called". He added: "Is any called in uncircumcision? let him not be circumcised", and went on to argue that circumcision did not matter: "Circumcision is nothing and uncircumcision is nothing. Keeping God's commands is what counts" (1 Cor 7:19).

Later he more explicitly denounced the practice, rejecting and condemning those who promoted circumcision to Gentile Christians. He accused those Judaizers who advocated circumcision of turning from the Spirit to the flesh. In the Epistle to the Galatians, Paul warned Gentile Christians that the advocates of circumcision were "false brothers" (Gal 2:4), and wrote: "Are you so foolish, that, whereas you began in the Spirit, you would now be made perfect by the flesh?" (Gal 3:3); he also wrote: "Listen! I, Paul, am telling you that if you let yourselves be circumcised, Christ will be of no benefit to you" (Gal 5:2). He accused circumcision advocates of wanting to make a good showing in the flesh (Gal 6:12–13), and of glorying or boasting of the flesh (Gal 6:12–14). Paul in his letters fiercely criticized the Judaizers that demanded circumcision for Gentile converts, and opposed them; he stressed instead that faith in Christ constituted a New Covenant with God, a covenant which essentially provides the justification and salvation for Gentiles from the harsh edicts of the Mosaic Law, a New Covenant that did not require circumcision (see also Justification by faith, Pauline passages supporting antinomianism, Abrogation of Old Covenant laws).

=== Later views ===
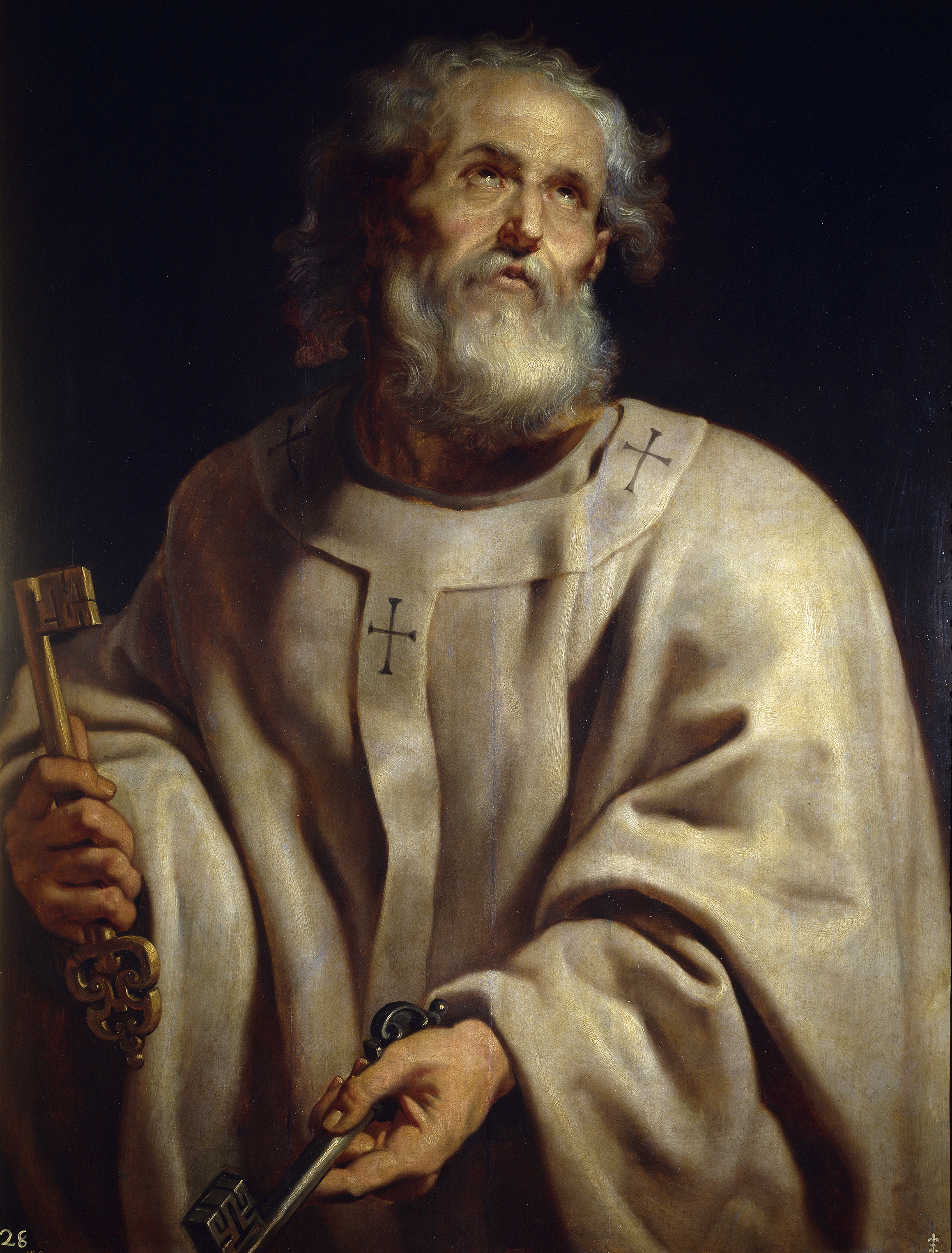
St. Peter holding the Keys of Heaven, by Rubens

According to Acts, Simon Peter condemned required circumcision of converts. When the various passages from the New Testament regarding circumcision are gathered together, a strongly negative view of circumcision emerges, according to Michael Glass. Some Biblical scholars think that the Epistle to Titus, generally attributed to Paul, but see Authorship of the Pauline epistles, may state that circumcision should be discouraged among Christians, though others believe this is a reference to Jews. Circumcision was so closely associated with Jewish men that Jewish Christians were referred to as "those of the circumcision" or conversely Christians who were circumcised were referred to as Jewish Christians or Judaizers. These terms (circumcised/uncircumcised) are generally interpreted to mean Jews and Greeks, who were predominate, however it is an oversimplification as 1st century Iudaea Province also had some Jews who were not circumcised, and some Greeks (called Proselytes or Judaizers) and others such as Egyptians, Ethiopians, and Arabs who were.

A common interpretation of the circumcision controversy of the New Testament was, that it was over the issue of whether Gentiles could enter the Church directly or ought to first convert to Judaism. However, the Halakha of Rabbinic Judaism was still under development at this time, as the Jewish Encyclopedia notes: "Jesus, however, does not appear to have taken into account the fact that the Halakha was at this period just becoming crystallized, and that much variation existed as to its definite form; the disputes of the Bet Hillel and Bet Shammai were occurring about the time of his maturity." This controversy was fought largely between opposing groups of Christians who were themselves ethnically Jewish, see section Jewish background above. According to this interpretation, those who felt that conversion to Judaism was a prerequisite for Church membership were eventually condemned by Paul as "Judaizing teachers".

The source of this interpretation is unknown; however, it appears related to Supersessionism or Hyperdispensationalism (see also New Perspective on Paul). In addition, modern Christians, such as Ethiopian Orthodox and Coptic Orthodox still practice circumcision while not considering it a part of conversion to Judaism, nor do they consider themselves to be Jews or Jewish Christians.

The Jewish Encyclopedia article on Gentile: Gentiles May Not Be Taught the Torah notes the following reconciliation:

R. Emden, in a remarkable apology for Christianity contained in his appendix to "Seder 'Olam" (pp. 32b-34b, Hamburg, 1752), gives it as his opinion that the original intention of Jesus, and especially of Paul, was to convert only the Gentiles to the seven moral laws of Noah and to let the Jews follow the Mosaic law—which explains the apparent contradictions in the New Testament regarding the laws of Moses and the Sabbath.

== Contemporary practices ==
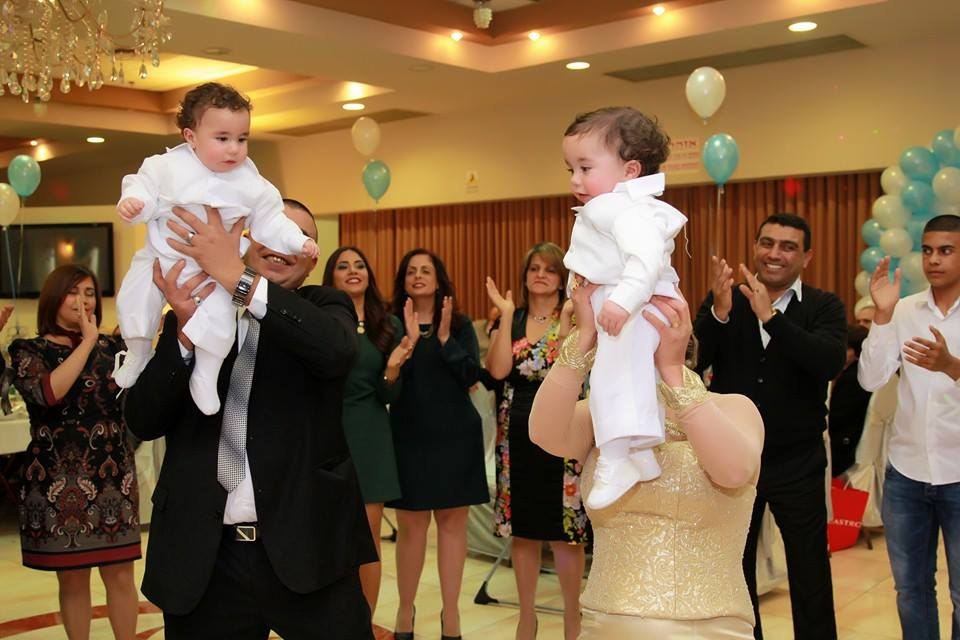
Coptic Children wearing traditional circumcision costumes

Today, many Christian denominations are neutral about male circumcision, not requiring it for religious observance, but neither forbidding it for medical or cultural reasons. Covenant theology largely views the Christian sacrament of baptism as fulfilling the Israelite practice of circumcision, both being signs and seals of the covenant of grace.

Since the Council of Florence, the Roman Catholic Church forbade the practice of circumcision among Christians; Roman Catholic scholars, including John J. Dietzen, David Lang, and Edwin F. Healy, argue that "elective male infant circumcision not only violates the proper application of the time-honored principle of totality, but even fits the ethical definition of mutilation, which is gravely sinful." Roman Catholicism generally is silent today with respect to its permissibility, though elective circumcision continues to be debated amongst theologians.

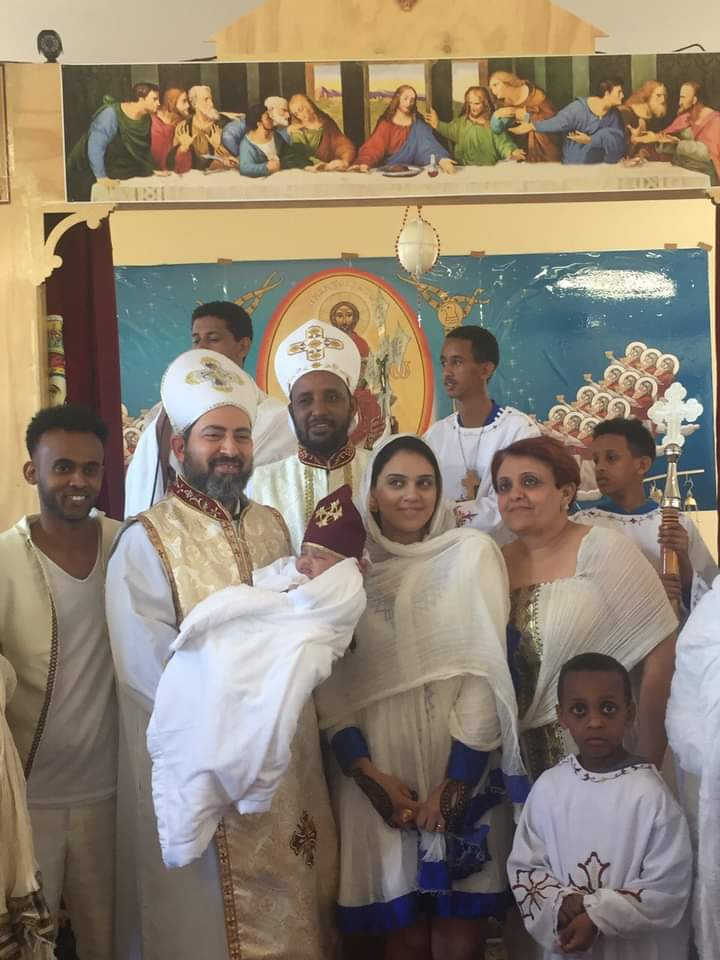
Ethiopian Orthodox Children wearing traditional circumcision costumes

The practice, on the other hand, is customary among the Coptic, Ethiopian, and Eritrean Orthodox Churches, and also some other African churches, and males are generally required to be circumcised shortly after birth as part of a rite of passage. The Ethiopian Orthodox Church calls for circumcision, with near-universal prevalence among Orthodox men in Ethiopia. Eritrean Orthodox practice circumcision as a rite of passage, and they circumcise their sons "anywhere from the first week of life to the first few year". Male circumcision is also widely practiced among Christian communities in Africa, certain Anglosphere countries, Oceania, South Korea, the Philippines and the Middle East. While Christian communities in Europe and South America have low circumcision rates. The United States and the Philippines are the largest majority Christian countries in the world to extensively practice circumcision. Some Christian churches in South Africa oppose circumcision, viewing it as a pagan ritual, while others, including the Nomiya church in Kenya, require circumcision for membership, despite St. Paul's warnings against those who required circumcision for salvation, in his epistle to the church of Galatia.

The Greek Orthodox Church and Lutheran Church do not advocate circumcision among their adherents, but celebrate the Feast of the Circumcision of Christ on 1 January, while Orthodox churches following the Julian calendar celebrate it on Gregorian 14 January. The Orthodox Church considers it one of the twelve "Great Feasts". In the Catholic, Lutheran and Anglican churches, the commemoration of the circumcision of Christ has been replaced by other commemorations, such as the Feast of the Holy Name in the Lutheran Churches and the Solemnity of Mary, Mother of God in the Catholic Church.

Even though mainstream Christian denominations do not require the practice and maintain a neutral position on it, it is practiced in certain Christian countries and communities, while it is not observed in other Christian countries and communities. Both religious and non-religious circumcision is common in some predominantly Christian countries such as the United States, but outside of the Jewish and Muslim communities, not for reasons of religious observance; see circumcision controversies. It may be significant that Jewish applicants to American medical schools comprised 60% of all applications in the 1930s, at a time when circumcision was becoming popular in the US. The prevalence of circumcision in the United States is approximately 80%. According to studies, American Evangelicals and Mormons have the highest rates of infant male circumcision among Christian denominations in the United States. According to Scholar Heather L. Armstrong of University of Southampton, about half of Christian males worldwide are circumcised, with most of them being located in Africa, Anglosphere countries (with notable prevalence in the United States) and the Philippines. Many Christians have been circumcised for reasons such as family preferences, medical or cultural reasons. Circumcision is also part of a traditional practice among the adherents of certain Oriental Christian denominations, including those of Coptic Christianity, the Ethiopian Orthodox Church and Eritrean Orthodox Church. Circumcision is common among Christians in the Philippines, South Korea, and Australia. Circumcision is near universal in the Christian countries of Oceania, and among the Christians of Africa, being common among Christians in countries such as the Cameroon, Democratic Republic of the Congo, Ethiopia, Eritrea, Ghana, Liberia, Nigeria, and Kenya, and is also widely practiced among Christians from Egypt, Syria, Lebanon, Jordan, Palestine, Israel, and North Africa. Circumcision is less common among the Christians of Canada, Europe and Latin America. It is practiced amongst some Christians in the Indian subcontinent.

== See also ==
- Christianity and Judaism
- Foreskin restoration
- Expounding of the Law
- Relations between early Christianity and Judaism
- Forced circumcision
