= Abrogation of Old Covenant laws =

Christian theological debate

In Christianity, the abrogation of Old Covenant laws is the belief that the entire Mosaic or Old Covenant is abrogated in that all of the Mosaic Laws are set aside for the Law of Christ. While most Christian theology reflects the view that at least some Mosaic Laws have been set aside (excluding the moral law as contained in the Ten Commandments) under the New Covenant, the belief in total abrogation of the Old Covenant is a minority belief.

Individuals who believe that Old Covenant laws have been completely abrogated are referred to as antinomians by various Christian traditions, such as the Catholic, Reformed, and Methodist denominations of Christianity, which teach that the moral law continues to be binding on the faithful.

== New Covenant theology ==
New Covenant theology is a Christian theological system that shares similarities with and yet is distinct from dispensationalism and Covenant theology. New Covenant theology sees all Old Covenant laws as "cancelled" or "abrogated" in favor of the Law of Christ or the New Testament. Douglas J. Moo has argued that 9 of the Ten Commandments have been renewed under the New Covenant.

== Dispensationalism ==
As a theological system, dispensationalism is rooted in the writings of John Nelson Darby (1800–1882) and the Brethren Movement, but it has never been formally defined and incorporates several variants. Major dispensational views divide history into some seven dispensations or ages:

1. Innocence (Gen 1:1–3:7), prior to Adam's fall;
2. Conscience (Gen 3:8–8:22), Adam to Noah;
3. Government (Gen 9:1–11:32), Noah to Abraham;
4. Patriarchal rule (Gen 12:1 – Exod 19:25), Abraham to Moses;
5. The Mosaic Law (Exod 20:1 – Acts 2:4), Moses to Jesus;
6. Grace (Acts 2:4 – Rev 20:3), the current church age; and
7. The Millennial Kingdom, a literal earthly 1000-year period that has yet to come (Rev 20:4–20:6).

Traditional dispensationalists believe only the New Testament applies to the church of today. They see the covenant of Sinai (dispensation #5) as having been replaced by the gospel (dispensation #6), but at least some dispensationalists believe that, although the time from Jesus' resurrection until his return (or the advent of the Millennium) is dominated by the proclamation of the gospel, the Sinai covenant is neither terminated nor replaced, rather it is "quiescent" awaiting a fulfillment at the Millennium. This time of Jewish restoration has an especially prominent place within dispensationalism.

Wayne G. Strickland, professor of theology at the Multnomah School of the Bible, claims that his dispensationalist view is that "the age of the church has rendered the law inoperative".

== History ==
=== Paul the Apostle ===
The relationship between Paul the Apostle and Judaism continues to be the subject of research, as it is thought that Paul played an important role in the relationship between Christianity and Judaism as a whole. The Oxford Dictionary of the Christian Church states that Paul's influence on Christian thinking is more significant than any other New Testament author.

Some scholars see Paul (or Saul) as completely in line with 1st-century Judaism (a "Pharisee" and student of Gamaliel or as part of Hellenistic Judaism), others see him as opposed to 1st-century Judaism (see Pauline passages supporting antinomianism and Marcionism), while the majority see him as somewhere in between these extremes, opposed to "Ritual Laws" (see for example Circumcision controversy in early Christianity) but in full agreement on "Divine Law". These views of Paul are paralleled by Christian views of the Old Covenant. See also Antithesis in the Bible and Christianity in the 1st century.

== See also ==
- Biblical law in Christianity
- Christian anarchism
- Christian ethics
- Supersessionism
