= Florentine Bechtel =

Florentine Stanislaus Bechtel
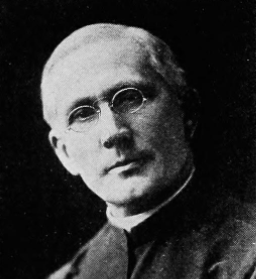
- Born: February 4, 1857; Haguenau, Alsace
- Died: November 22, 1933 (aged 76); Chicago, Illinois
- Occupation: Biblical scholar

The Reverend Florentine Stanislaus Bechtel, S.J., (February 4, 1857 – November 22, 1933) was a French-born American Biblical scholar.

== Biography ==
Florentine Stanislaus Bechtel was born in Haguenau, Alsace on February 4, 1857.

He was educated at the College of Providence in Amiens. He entered the Jesuits in 1874 in his native France and was sent to serve the Jesuit missions in the Midwestern United States and studied theology at the former Jesuit St. Stanislaus Seminary in Florissant, Missouri. He taught Hebrew and Sacred Scripture at St. Louis University, St. Louis, Missouri, and was a contributor to the Catholic Encyclopedia articles, including: Pillar of Cloud; Plagues of Egypt, Machabees, etc.

Bechtel died in Chicago on November 22, 1933.
