= Dispensation (theology) =

Distinctive arrangement or period in history

In theology, one meaning of the term dispensation is as a distinctive arrangement or period in history that forms the framework through which God relates to mankind.

== In Christian theology ==
The concept of a dispensation – the arrangement of divisions in biblical history – dates back to Irenaeus in the second century. Other Christian writers and leaders since then, such as Augustine of Hippo and Joachim of Fiore (1135–1202), have also offered their own dispensation arrangements of history. The Plymouth Brethren systematized dispensationalism, which has since been adopted by other groups, including certain Baptists and Pentecostals. Modern Catholic documents refer to God's covenant with Israel in the Old Testament as "a special dispensation" which anticipated "the Christian dispensation", and also refer to the era of the new covenant as "the new dispensation".

Below is a table comparing some of the various dispensational schemes:

	Range of Bible Chapters							
Schemes	Genesis 1–3	Genesis 3–8	Genesis 9–11	Genesis 12 to Exodus 19	Exodus 20 to Acts 1	Acts 2 to Revelation 20	Revelation 20:4–6	Revelation 20–22
7 or 8 Dispensational; Scheme	Innocence or Edenic	Conscience or Antediluvian	Civil Government	Patriarchal or Promise	Mosaic or Law	Grace or Church	Millennial Kingdom	Eternal State or Final
4 Dispensational; Scheme	Patriarchal				Mosaic	Ecclesial	Zionic	
3 Dispensational; Scheme (Reformed or minimalist position)	Freedom	Grace (Law)				Grace (Gospel)	Kingdom	

Although the divine revelation unfolds progressively, the deposit of truth in earlier time-periods is not discarded, rather it is cumulative. Thus conscience (moral responsibility) is an abiding truth in human life (Romans 2:15; 9:1; 2 Corinthians 1:12; 4:2), although it does not continue as a dispensation. Similarly, the saved of this present dispensation are "not under law" as a specific test of obedience to divine revelation (Galatians 5:18; cf. Galatians 2:16; 3:11), yet the law remains an integral part of dispensational teaching. The Law clarifies that, although Christ fulfilled the law for us, by it we have had the knowledge of sin (Rom 7:7), and it is an integral part of the Holy Scriptures, which, to the redeemed, are profitable for "training in righteousness" (2 Ti. 3:16–17; cp. Ro. 15:4). The purpose of each dispensation, then, is to place man under a specific rule of conduct, but such stewardship is not a condition of salvation. In every past dispensation unregenerate man has failed, much like he is failing in the present dispensation, and will fail in the future until Eternity arrives. Salvation has been and will continue to be available to everyone by God's grace through faith.

== Baháʼí dispensations ==
In the Baháʼí Faith, a dispensation is a period of progressive revelation relating to the major religions of humanity, usually with a prophet accompanying it. The faith's founder Bahá'u'lláh advanced the concept that dispensations tend to be millennial, mentioning in the Kitáb-i-Íqán that God will renew the "City of God" about every thousand years, and specifically mentioned that a new Manifestation of God would not appear within 1,000 years (1852–2852) of the inaugurating moment of Bahá'u'lláh's Dispensation, but that the authority of Bahá'u'lláh's message could last up to 500,000 years.

== Latter Day Saint dispensations ==
In the Latter Day Saint movement, a dispensation is a period of time in which God gave priesthood authority to men on the Earth through prophetic callings. Between each dispensation is an apostasy where the priesthood is at least partially absent. The LDS Bible Dictionary says

A dispensation of the gospel is a period of time in which the Lord has at least one authorized servant on the earth who bears the holy priesthood and the keys, and who has a divine commission to dispense the gospel to the inhabitants of the earth.

== See also ==
- Dispensationalist theology
