= Biblical law =

Legal aspects of the Bible

Biblical law refers to the set of rules found in the Jewish Tanakh, and sometimes also Christian commentaries on these laws in the New Testament. Christianity and Judaism have different approaches to Jewish law.

== Judaism ==
- Law of Moses
- Mitzvah, divine commandment
  - The Ten Commandments
  - 613 commandments
- Seven Laws of Noah, laws applicable to all of humanity, including non-Jews

== Christianity ==
- Abrogation of Old Covenant laws
- Christian views on the Old Covenant, term referring to the theological discussion of the applicability of Hebrew Bible law in a Christian context
- Cafeteria Christianity, a derogatory term used to accuse other Christian individuals or denominations of selecting which Christian doctrines they will follow, and which they will not
- Evangelical counsels, or counsels of perfection in Christianity are chastity, poverty (or perfect charity), and obedience
- Expounding of the Law by Jesus, according to the Gospel of Matthew
- The Great Commandment
- Law and Gospel, the relationship between God's Law and the Gospel of Jesus Christ is a major topic in Lutheran and Reformed theology
- Law of Christ, a Pauline phrase referring to loving one's neighbor and to the New Covenant principles and commands of Jesus the Messiah, whose precise meaning has varying views by different Christian groups and denominations
- The New Commandment of Jesus, according to the Gospel of John
- The Pauline privilege regarding marriage
- The rule of faith of Paul the Apostle
- The Sermon on the Mount provides moral precepts that often extend beyond mere external, legal compliance.
- The unforgivable sin
- The New Testament household code, instructions in the New Testament writings of the apostles Paul and Peter to pairs of Christian people in different domestic and civil structures of society

== Theology ==
- Antinomianism, general term used for the opposition to biblical laws
- Divine law, any law that is understood as deriving from a transcendent source, such as the will of God or gods, in contrast to man-made law
- Theonomy, a hypothetical form of government based on divine law
