= New Perspective on Paul =

Academic movement in biblical studies

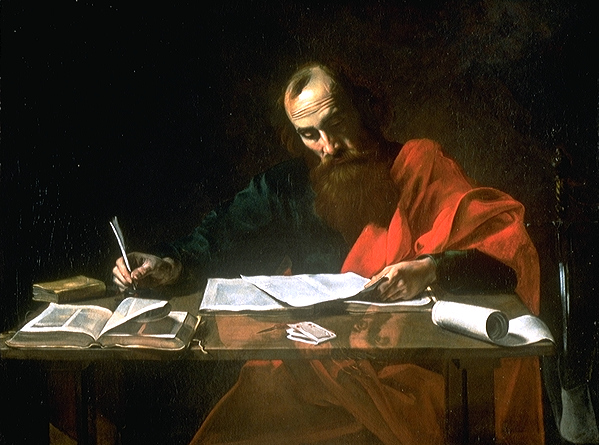
Valentin de Boulogne: Saint Paul Writing His Epistles (c. 1618–1620), Museum of Fine Arts, Houston, Texas. Nowadays, biblical scholars believe that the Apostle Paul actually dictated his letters to a secretary (e.g., Romans 16:22).

The New Perspective on Paul is an academic movement within the field of biblical studies concerned with the understanding of the writings of the Apostle Paul. The "New Perspective" movement began with the publication of the 1977 book Paul and Palestinian Judaism by E. P. Sanders, an American New Testament scholar and Christian theologian.

The Protestant perspective has generally asserted that Paul advocates justification through faith in Jesus Christ over justification through works of the Mosaic Law. During the Protestant Reformation, this theological principle became known as sola fide ("faith alone"); this was traditionally understood as Paul arguing that good works performed by Christians would not factor into their salvation; only their faith in Jesus Christ would save them. In this perspective, Paul dismissed 1st-century Judaism as a sterile and legalistic religion.

According to Sanders, Paul's letters do not address good works but instead question Jewish religious observances such as circumcision, dietary laws, and Sabbath laws, which were the "boundary markers" that set the Jews apart from other ethno-religious groups in the Levant. Sanders further argues that 1st-century Judaism was not a "legalistic community", nor was it oriented to "salvation by works". As God's "chosen people", they were under his covenant. Contrary to Protestant belief, following the Mosaic Law was not a way of entering the covenant but of staying within it.

== Development ==
In 1963, Krister Stendahl, a Swedish New Testament scholar, Christian theologian, and professor emeritus at Harvard Divinity School considered by modern biblical scholarship to have been as influential as E. P. Sanders in the development of the "New Perspective on Paul", published a paper arguing that the typical Lutheran view of Paul's theology did not align with statements in Paul's writings. He argued that its view was based on incorrect assumptions about Paul's beliefs, not careful interpretation of his writings. Stendahl warned against imposing modern Western ideas on the Bible, and especially on the works of Paul. In 1977, E. P. Sanders, an American New Testament scholar and Christian theologian, published the essay Paul and Palestinian Judaism.

Sanders continued to publish books and articles in this field, and was soon joined by James D. G. Dunn, a British New Testament scholar and Wesleyan theologian who served as President of the Studiorum Novi Testamenti Societas in 2002. Dunn reports that N. T. Wright, a British New Testament scholar and Anglican theologian who served as bishop of Durham from 2003 to 2010, was the first to use the term "New Perspective on Paul" in his 1978 Tyndale lecture. The term became more widely known after being used by Dunn as the title of his 1982 Manson Memorial lecture, in which he summarized and affirmed the movement. The work of these writers inspired a significant volume of study, as well as a new generation of scholars. N. T. Wright has written a large number of works aimed at popularising the "new perspective" outside of academia.

The "New Perspective" movement is closely connected with a surge of recent scholarly interest in studying the Bible in its historical and geopolitical context and in comparison with other ancient texts through the use of social-scientific methods. Scholars affiliated with The Context Group (Note: Esler, Philip F. Conflict and Identity in Romans: The Social Setting of Paul's Letter. Minneapolis: Fortress Press, 2003.) (Note: Malina, Bruce J. & Neyrey, Jerome H., Portraits of Paul: An Archaeology of Ancient Personality, Louisville: John Knox Press, 1996.) (Note: Neyrey, Jerome H., Paul, in Other Words: A Cultural Reading of His Letters. Louisville: John Knox Press, 1990.) have called for various reinterpretations of biblical texts based on studies of the ancient world.

== Main ideas ==
It is often noted that the singular title "New Perspective" gives the impression of unity that is unjustified. In 2003, N. T. Wright, distancing himself from both Sanders and Dunn, commented that "there are probably almost as many 'new' perspective positions as there are writers espousing it—and I disagree with most of them".

=== Works of the Law ===
The Pauline epistles contain a substantial amount of criticism regarding the "works of the Law". By contrast, "New Perspective" scholars see Paul as talking about "badges of covenant membership" or criticizing God-fearers who had begun to rely on the Torah to reckon Jewish kinship. It is argued that in Paul's time, Israelites were being faced with a choice of whether to continue to follow their ancestral customs, the Torah, or to follow the Roman Empire's trend to adopt Greek customs, a phenomenon known as Hellenization, an outgrowth of which was Hellenistic Judaism. The "new perspective" view is that Paul's writings discuss the comparative merits of following Torah-based or ancient Greek customs. Paul is interpreted as being critical of a common Jewish view that following traditional Israelite customs makes a person better off before God, pointing out that Abraham was righteous before the Torah was given. Paul identifies customs he is concerned about, such as circumcision, dietary laws, and observance of special days.

Craig A. Evans argues that a text of the Dead Sea Scrolls known as 4QMMT employs the expression "works of the Law" to refer solely to purity laws like avoiding eating with Gentiles, which he argues shows that Paul's criticism of salvation through "works of the Law" was meant that Gentiles need not adopt Jewish purity laws in order to be justified.

Recent studies of the Greek word pistis have concluded that its primary and most common meaning was faithfulness, meaning firm commitment in an interpersonal relationship.

=== Grace or favor ===
Writers with a more historic Protestant perspective have generally translated the Greek word charis as "grace" and understood it to refer to the idea that there is a lack of human effort in salvation because God is the controlling factor. Proponents of the "New Perspective" argue that "favor" is a better translation, as the word normally refers to "doing a favor". In ancient societies, there was the expectation that such favors be repaid, and this semi-formal system of favors acted like loans. Gift giving corresponded with the expectation of reciprocity. Therefore, it is argued that when Paul speaks of how God did humankind a "favor" by sending Jesus, he is saying that God took the initiative, but is not implying a lack of human effort in salvation, and is in fact implying that Christians have an obligation to repay the favor God has done for them. Some argue that this view then undermines the initial "favor" of sending Jesus by saying that, despite his life, death, and resurrection, Christians still have, as before, to earn their way to heaven. However, others note this is the horns of a false dilemma (all grace versus all works). Many new-perspective proponents who see charis as "favor" do not teach that Christians earn their way to heaven outside of the death of Jesus. Forgiveness of sins through the blood of Jesus is still necessary to salvation, but forgiveness demands effort on the part of the individual (cf. Paul in Phil. 3:12–16).

=== Atonement ===
To writers of the historic Protestant perspectives, the penal substitution atonement theory and the belief in the "finished work" of Jesus have been central. "New Perspective" scholars have regularly questioned whether this view is really of such central importance in Paul's writings. Generally, "New Perspective" scholars have argued that other theories of the atonement are more central to Paul's thinking, but there has been little agreement among them about what Paul's real view of the atonement might be.

The following is a broad sample of different views advocated by various scholars:

- E. P. Sanders argued that Paul's central idea was that we mystically spiritually participate in the risen Jesus and that all Paul's judicial language was subordinate to the participatory language.
- N. T. Wright has argued that Paul sees Israel as representative of humanity and taking onto itself the sinfulness of humanity through history. Jesus, in turn, as the Messiah, is the representative of Israel and so focuses the sins of Israel on himself on the cross. Wright's view is thus a "historicized" form of penal substitution.
- Chris VanLandingham has argued that Paul sees Jesus as having defeated the Devil and as teaching humans how God wants them to live and setting them an example.
- David Brondos has argued that Paul sees Jesus as just a part in a wider narrative in which the Church is working to transform the lives of individuals and the world, and that Paul's participatory language should be understood in an ethical sense (humans living Jesus-like lives) rather than mystically as Sanders thought.
- Pilch and Malina take the view that Paul holds to the satisfaction theory of atonement.
- Stephen Finlan holds that Paul uses numerous different metaphors to describe the atonement; "justified by his blood" (Romans 5:9) means that a cultic substance has a judicial effect. Paul also taught that believers are transformed into the image of God through Jesus (theosis).

== Ethics ==
=== Grace as an unconditional gift ===
Many theological traditions maintain that charis refers to a form of generosity that is not conditioned upon human response. According to this perspective, divine giving is fundamentally non-reciprocal and cannot be repaid. This interpretation promotes a framework in which moral action is only understood as a voluntary and authentic expression of gratitude. John Barclay argues that grace (charis) in Paul is distinctive because God gives without regard to whether or not the recipient deserves it. However, this does not mean that graces comes without any expectations of response. Rather, receiving an undeserving gift transforms the recipient and draws them into an active ethical life in the Christian community. Therefore, good behavior is neither a way to earn grace nor optional, but a natural result of being transformed by it.

=== Tension between freedom and obligation ===
The contrast between non-reciprocal grace and reciprocal favor gives rise to ethical tension. On one hand, there is emphasis on unconditional safeguarding moral freedom by ensuring that actions are not performed under compulsion. On the other hand, reciprocal framework underscores the importance of responsibility and discourages moral complacency. N. T. Wright suggests that Paul's writings reflect nuanced position in which divine generosity initiates relationships, but the human response being essential. From this perspective, ethical behaviors are neither coerced nor optional, but rather natural and expected outworking of participation in covenantal relationship.

== Criticism ==
The "New Perspective on Paul" has been a controversial subject, drawing strong arguments and recriminations from both sides of the debate.

In 2003, Steve Chalke, influenced by "New Perspective" scholars, published a book targeted at a popular audience that made comments interpreted as highly critical of the penal substitution theory of the atonement. This caused an extensive and ongoing controversy among conservative Evangelicals in the United Kingdom, with a strong backlash from laypeople and advocates of the historic Protestant traditions.

The continuing controversy led to the Evangelical Alliance organising a symposium in July 2005 to discuss the issue. A record of this symposium includes a chapter by Chalke and his views are also contained in "the atonement debate". A group of three conservative Evangelical theologians responded to Chalke with their book, Pierced for our Transgressions (Crossway Publishing, 2007), which strongly criticised Chalke's position as inconsistent with some evangelical confessions of faith. However, N. T. Wright endorsed Chalke and spoke out against the latter book, commenting, for instance, that "despite the ringing endorsements of famous men, it (Pierced For Our Transgressions) is deeply, profoundly, and disturbingly unbiblical."

The most outspoken critics of the "New Perspective on Paul" include Douglas Moo, Thomas R. Schreiner, Wayne Grudem, Robert J. Cara, John Piper, Sinclair Ferguson, C. W. Powell, the minister and theologian Tom Holland, and Ligon Duncan. In 2015, John M. G. Barclay published Paul and the Gift, which re-frames Paul's theology of grace and, in doing so, provides a critique of the "New Perspective". The book presents grace as central to Paul’s thought and, drawing on ancient gift theory, argues that grace generates reciprocal obligations that form communities centered on the unconditioned Christ‑gift, while explicitly affirming the ongoing validity and distinctiveness of Jewish identity and practice.

== Roman Catholic and Eastern Orthodox reactions ==
The "New Perspective on Paul" has, by and large, been an internal debate among Protestant biblical scholars. Many Roman Catholic and Eastern Orthodox scholars have responded favorably to the "New Perspective", seeing a greater commonality with certain strands of their own traditions.

Historical Protestantism has never denied that there is a place for good works, but has always excluded them from the doctrine of justification, which Protestant Christians argue is through faith alone, and to which good deeds do not contribute, whether with or without God's grace. This has, since the Reformation, been a line of distinction between Protestantism (both Reformed and Lutheran) and other Christian communions.

== See also ==
- Catholic–Lutheran dialogue
  - "Joint Declaration on the Doctrine of Justification" (1999)
- Corporate election
- Criticism of the Bible
- Criticism of Protestantism
- Early Christianity
  - Christianity in the 1st century
  - Circumcision controversy in early Christianity
  - Jewish Christianity
  - Paul the Apostle and Judaism
  - Pauline Christianity
  - Judaizers
- History of Christianity
  - Historical background of the New Testament
  - Historicity of Jesus
  - Historicity of the Acts of the Apostles
  - Historicity of the canonical Gospels
  - History of the Jews in the Roman Empire
- Jewish views on Jesus
    - Jesus in the Talmud
    - Rejection of Jesus
- Relations between Judaism and Christianity
  - Antisemitism in Christianity
  - British Israelism
  - Christian views on the Old Covenant
  - Christian Zionism and anti-Zionism
  - Christian–Jewish reconciliation
  - Pope John Paul II and Judaism
  - Sabbath in Christianity
  - Seven Laws of Noah
