= Proselyte =

Biblical term for convert

Proselyte is the anglicized form of the Greek word prosēlutos (Koine Greek: προσήλυτος, lit. 'stranger' or 'newcomer'). In the Septuagint, the classical Greek translation of the Tanakh, the term refers to someone born outside of the Jewish community who relocates to the Land of Israel and adopts, either fully or partially, the observance of mitzvot (Hebrew: מִצְווֹת, lit. 'commandments') and practice of Judaism. The term is itself a translation of ger toshav (גֵּר תּוֹשָׁב, 'resident alien'), a rabbinic designation found in the Mishnah and Talmud for a non‑Jewish resident who accepts certain commandments and protections of the Jewish community; it is distinct from a full convert (גֵּר צֶדֶק). The term also has the more general meaning in English of a new convert to any particular religion or doctrine.

== History of the proselyte in Israel ==
The Law of Moses made specific regulations regarding the admission into Israel's community of such as were not born Israelites.

The New Testament makes mention of proselytes in synagogues. The name proselyte occurs in the New Testament only in Matthew and Acts. The name by which they are commonly designated is that of "devout men", or men "fearing God", or "worshipping God", "fearers of Heaven" or "God-fearers".

On the historical meaning of the Greek word, in chapter 2 of the apocryphal Gospel of Nicodemus, roughly dated between 150 and 400, Annas and Caiaphas define "proselyte" for Pilate:

And Pilate, summoning the Jews, says to them: You know that my wife is a worshipper of God, and prefers to adhere to the Jewish religion along with you. ... Annas and Caiaphas say to Pilate: All the multitude of us cry out that he [Jesus] was born of fornication, and are not believed; these [who disagree] are proselytes, and his disciples. And Pilate, calling Annas and Caiaphas, says to them: What are proselytes? They say to him: They are by birth children of the Greeks, and have now become Jews.

— Roberts Translation

== In Judaism ==
There are two kinds of proselytes in Rabbinic Judaism: ger tzedek (righteous proselytes, proselytes of righteousness, religious proselyte, devout proselyte) and ger toshav (resident proselyte, proselytes of the gate, limited proselyte, half-proselyte).

A "righteous proselyte" is a gentile who has converted to Judaism, is bound to all the doctrines and precepts of Judaism, and is thus a Jew. The proselyte immerses in a mikveh to effect the conversion formally; a male proselyte must also be circumcised before the immersion can occur (mila leshem giur)

A "gate proselyte" is a resident alien who lives in the Land of Israel and follows some Jewish customs. They are not required to be circumcised nor to comply with the whole of the Torah. They are bound only to conform to the Seven Laws of Noah (do not worship idols, do not blaspheme God's name, do not murder, do not commit fornication (immoral sexual acts), do not steal, do not tear the limb from a living animal, and do not fail to establish rule of law) to be assured of a place in the world to come.

== In early Christianity ==
The "religious proselytes" spoken of in early Christianity such as Acts 13:43 were likely righteous proselytes rather than gate proselytes. There is some debate however as to whether God-fearers (Phoboumenoi) and/or Worshippers (Sebomenoi), who were baptized but not circumcised, fall into the righteous or gate category. The New Testament uses the word four times, exclusively referring to converts to Judaism, and never referring to conversion to Christianity.

== See also ==
- Anusim
- Gerim
- Noahidism
