= Seven Laws of Noah =

Moral laws in Judaism

The rainbow is the unofficial symbol of Noahidism, recalling the Genesis flood narrative in which a rainbow appears to Noah after the Flood. It represents God's promise to Noah to refrain from flooding the Earth and destroying all life again.

In Judaism, the Seven Laws of Noah (Hebrew: שבע מצוות בני נח, Sheva Mitzvot B'nei Noach), otherwise referred to as the Noahide Laws or the Noachian Laws (from the Hebrew pronunciation of "Noah"), are a set of universal moral laws which, according to the Talmud, were given by God as a covenant with Noah and with the "sons of Noah"—that is, all of humanity.

The Seven Laws of Noah consist of prohibitions against worshipping idols, cursing God, murder, adultery and sexual immorality, theft, eating flesh torn from a living animal, as well as the obligation to establish courts of justice.

According to Jewish law, non-Jews (Gentiles) are not obligated to convert to Judaism, but they are required to observe the Seven Laws of Noah to be assured of a place in the World to Come (Olam Ha-Ba), the final reward of the righteous. The non-Jews that choose to follow the Seven Laws of Noah are regarded as "Righteous Gentiles" (Hebrew: חסידי אומות העולם, Chassiddei Umot ha-Olam: "Pious People of the World").

== List ==
The Seven Laws of Noah as traditionally enumerated in the Babylonian Talmud (Sanhedrin 56a-b) and Tosefta (Avodah Zarah 9:4), are the following:

1. Not to worship idols.
2. Not to curse God.
3. Not to commit murder.
4. Not to commit adultery or sexual immorality.
5. Not to steal.
6. Not to eat flesh torn from a living animal.
7. To establish courts of justice.

According to the Talmud, the seven Noahide laws were given first to Adam and subsequently to Noah. The Tannaitic and Amoraitic rabbinic sages (1st–6th centuries AD) disagreed on the exact number of Noahide laws that were originally given to Adam. Six of the seven laws were exegetically derived from passages in the Book of Genesis, with the seventh being the establishment of courts of justice. The earliest complete rabbinic version of the seven Noahide laws can be found in the Tosefta:

Seven commandments were commanded of the sons of Noah:

1. concerning adjudication (dinim)
2. concerning idolatry (avodah zarah)
3. concerning blasphemy (qilelat ha-Shem)
4. concerning sexual immorality (gilui arayot)
5. concerning blood-shed (shefikhut damim)
6. concerning robbery (gezel)
7. concerning a limb torn from a living animal (ever min ha-hay)

== Origins ==
=== Hebrew Bible ===
The universal morality of the Noahide covenant for Gentiles (non-Jews) was already affirmed in the Torah and was subsequently highlighted in the Book of Genesis (e.g., relating to Melchizedek in Genesis 14:18–20), the Book of Job, and the Book of Jonah (showing that God would be known and his call for repentance responded to even by the evil Ninevites, making them acceptable to God), showing that God directly related to every person regardless of their culture or religion, and would save all "Righteous Gentiles" who conformed to the Seven Laws of Noah.

=== Book of Jubilees ===
The Book of Jubilees, generally dated to the 1st century BCE, includes a substantially different list of six commandments at verses 7:20–25: (1) to observe righteousness; (2) to cover the shame of their flesh; (3) to bless their creator; (4) to honor their parents; (5) to love their neighbor; and (6) to guard against fornication, uncleanness, and all iniquity.

== Samaritanism ==
In the Samaritan Pentateuch and tradition there is no record of Noahide Laws as in rabbinical literature.

People who are not in the Samaritan community or seeking to practice the tenets of Samaritanism are considered foreigners. The Torah is not binding nor applicable to them, unless a potential convert decides or is in the process of joining the community, in which he/she must partake of the Paschal lamb and live with them for at least three years following all communal and ceremonial laws to be fully integrated which includes being circumcised if male.

Instead of seeking converts, they consider themselves to be a source of blessing to all the families of the nations by keeping their covenant and guarding the Torah on Mount Gerizim, the chosen and blessed place given by the God of Israel to them as enumerated many times in their book of Genesis and Deuteronomy, and expounded upon by Samaritan commentaries.

=== List ===
According to the Torah/Pentateuch (Genesis 9:4-7), three laws are explicitly stated for Noah and his descendants (non-Abrahamic peoples) for the fundamental moral code considered expected and virtuous though not enforceable nor envisioned as a messianic end of days establishment of an Israelite or 'Noahide' global court but rather considered divinely sanctioned are the following:

1. "You shall not eat flesh with its life, that is, its blood..." (Do not eat blood from a live animal)
2. "And I will require your lifeblood. From every living human, I will require it..." (Seeking justice for murder victims)
3. "Be fruitful and multiply, and populate abundantly in the earth, and multiply therein..." (Pro-creation)

=== Commentary and tradition ===
In the book of Memar Marqah, a homiletic tractate, it is mentioned regarding the day of vengeance and recompense in its full weight and responsibility as being applicable only to the sons of Israel. All other nations and peoples are subject to their own moral laws, codes, cultures and fates as Marqah the Samaritan sage and priest pointed out in his works expounding on the Israelite Samaritan Torah.

Other references in the Torah scripture and Samaritan teachings which suggest and prove Israelite ancestral particularism is in regards to inheritance, cultures, and social structures; and the celestial bodies and heavenly hosts which can be read as the nations who are non-Israelites being 'allotted' other natural forces and/or spiritual powers and beings outside of the covenant, the Israelite Samaritan traditional cosmology regarding angels, humans, and "Sheedem" the gods of other religions appears evident to back this conclusion.

== Modern analysis ==
=== Rabbinical ===
The Talmudic tractate Sanhedrin 105a named and excluded certain specific Jewish and non-Jewish groups of the distant past from salvation, but thereby implied, as explicitly stated there, that all other non-Jews of past or present could be righteous and would be saved as they were, without Gentiles needing to undergo conversion to Judaism. Following Moses Maimonides' assessment of Islam as a non-idolatrous religion, many medieval Jewish authorities treated Muslims as subject to and in conformity with the Noahide laws, despite Islam's perceived errors and cruelties towards the Jews. The 13th–14th-century Catalan rabbi Menachem ben Solomon Ha-Meiri went further, extending a similar non-idolatrous status to contemporary Christianity.

The Talmud has accounts illustrating how far God's lovingkindness and mercies might extend, giving ultimate salvation even to persons who had led notoriously evil lives. Some said that if those persons had done only one truly selfless, kind and good deed in their entire lives God, would accept them for the sake of that precious act into Paradise, either immediately at death (if their death was the result of an extraordinarily generous, self-sacrificing, or courageous deed) or after they had atoned for their sins in Purgatory. So it is evident that full observance of the Noahide covenant itself was not always obligatory for salvation after all, even if it remained the chief guide to lives of spiritual loftiness and nobility.

This led the 18th-century Italian Jewish Kabbalist and rabbi Moshe Chaim Luzzatto to emphasize and explain at length that God would end up accepting all humanity, good and evil alike, into the World to Come (Olam Ha-Ba)—the evil ones, however, would of course need to purify themselves in Purgatory first, but there will be no eternal punishment for them.

Yosef Albo writes in Sefer ha-Ikkarim that Noachian and Mosaic law differed in detail but agreed generally. Mosaic law existed in Israel, while the other nations had Noachian law, which came down to geographical and national/ancestral diversity. The other nations attained happiness via Noachian law due to its divinity, but not as much as Israelites via the Torah. He posits that there could be two divine laws existing simultaneously among different nations, through which people can attain different levels of happiness. According to Albo, "this difference in the laws can not concern fundamental or derivative principles. Therefore the examination of the law itself is always of the same kind. But the examination relating to the messenger may undergo change. At all events the verification must be direct, though the verification of one religion may be different from that of another."

During the 1860s in Western Europe, a resurgence of Noahide faith as the universal moral religion for Gentiles (non-Jews) was developed by the 19th-century Italian Jewish Kabbalist and rabbi Elijah Benamozegh. Between the years 1920s–1930s, French writer Aimé Pallière adopted the Seven Laws of Noah at the suggestion of his teacher Elijah Benamozegh. Afterwards, Pallière spread Benamozegh's doctrine in Europe and never formally converted to Judaism.

Modern historians argue that Benamozegh's role in the debate on Jewish universalism in the history of Jewish philosophy was focused on the Noahide laws for Gentiles as the means subservient to the shift of Jewish ethics from particularism to universalism, although the arguments that he used to support his universalistic viewpoint were neither original nor unheard in the history of this debate. According to Clémence Boulouque, Carl and Bernice Witten Associate Professor of Jewish and Israel Studies at Columbia University in the City of New York, Benamozegh ignored the ethnocentric biases contained in the Noahide laws, whereas some contemporary right-wing Jewish political movements have embraced them.

The Encyclopedia Talmudit, edited by the 20th-century Belarusian Hasidic rabbi Shlomo Yosef Zevin, states that after the giving of the Torah, the Jewish people were no longer included in the category of the sons of Noah. Maimonides (Mishneh Torah, Hilkhot Melakhim 9:1) indicates that the seven commandments are also part of the Torah, and the Babylonian Talmud (Sanhedrin 59a, see also Tosafot ad. loc.) states that Jews are obligated in all things that Gentiles are obligated in, albeit with some differences in the details. According to the Encyclopedia Talmudit, most medieval Jewish authorities considered that all the seven commandments were given to Adam, although Maimonides (Mishneh Torah, Hilkhot Melakhim 9:1) considered the dietary law to have been given to Noah.

Menachem Mendel Schneerson, the Lubavitcher Rebbe, published and spoke about the Seven Laws of Noah many times. According to Schneerson's view, based on a detailed reading of Maimonides' tractate Hilkhot Melakhim in the Mishneh Torah, the Talmud, and the Hebrew Bible, the seven commandments originally given to Noah were given yet again, through Moses at Sinai, and it is exclusively through the giving of the Torah that the seven commandments derive their current force. What has changed with the giving of the Torah is that now, it is the duty of the Jewish people to bring the rest of the world to fulfill the Seven Laws of Noah.

=== Academic and secular ===
According to Michael S. Kogan, professor of Philosophy and Religious studies at Montclair State University, the Seven Laws of Noah are not explicitly mentioned in the Torah but were exegetically extrapolated from the Book of Genesis by 2nd-century rabbis, which wrote them down in the Tosefta.

According to Adam J. Silverstein, professor of Middle Eastern studies and Islamic studies at the Hebrew University of Jerusalem, Jewish theologians started to rethink the relevance and applicability of the Seven Laws of Noah during the Middle Ages, primarily due to the precarious living conditions of the Jewish people under the Medieval Christian kingdoms and the Islamic world (see Jewish–Christian relations and Jewish–Islamic relations), since both Christians and Muslims recognize the patriarch Abraham as the unifying figure of the Abrahamic tradition, alongside the monotheistic conception of God.

Silverstein states that Jewish theology came to include concepts and frameworks that would permit certain types of non-Jews to be recognized as righteous and deserving of life in the Hereafter due to the "Noachide Law". He sees there being two "Torahs": one for Jews, the other for the gentile "Children of Noah". Whilst theoretically the Noachide Law should be universal, its prohibitions against blasphemy and idolatry mean that in practice it only really applied to non-idolatrous theists. Therefore, Jews normally considered Christians and/or Muslims when discussing this concept.

David Novak, professor of Jewish theology and ethics at the University of Toronto, presents a range of theories regarding the sources from which the Seven Laws of Noah originated, including the Hebrew Bible itself, Hittite laws, the Maccabean period, and the Roman period. Regarding the modern Noahide movement, he denounced it by stating that "If Jews are telling Gentiles what to do, it's a form of imperialism".

== Judaism ==
=== Talmud ===
According to the Babylonian Talmud, the Seven Laws of Noah laws apply to all of humanity. In Judaism, the term B'nei Noach (Hebrew: בני נח, "Sons of Noah") refers to all mankind. The Talmud also states: "Righteous people of all nations have a share in the world to come". Any non-Jew who lives according to these laws is regarded as one of the Righteous among the Gentiles. According to the Talmud, the Noahide covenant was given first to Adam and subsequently to Noah. Six of the seven laws were exegetically derived from passages in the Book of Genesis, with the seventh being the establishment of courts of justice.

The Talmudic sages expanded the concept of universal morality within the Noahide laws and added several other laws beyond the seven listed in the Talmud and Tosefta which are attributed to different rabbis, such as prohibitions against committing incest, cruelty to animals, pairing animals of different species, grafting trees of different kinds, castration, emasculation, homosexuality, pederasty, and sorcery among others, with some of the sages, such as Ulla, going so far as to make a list of 30 laws. The Talmud expands the scope of the seven laws to cover about 100 of the 613 mitzvot.

=== Punishment ===
In practice, Jewish law makes it very difficult to apply the Jewish death penalty. No record exists of a Gentile having been put to death for violating the seven Noahide laws. Some of the categories of capital punishment recorded in the Talmud are recorded as having never been carried out. It is thought that the rabbis included discussion of them in anticipation of the coming Messianic Age. A Noahide is free from punishment if he commits a sin unwittingly. Also, if a Noahide commits a sin under duress, even one for which a Jew is obligated to undergo martyrdom rather than transgress (e.g. idolatry), he is not liable to punishment.

According Sanhedrin 56a, for Noahides convicted of a capital crime, the only sanctioned method of execution is decapitation, considered one of the lightest capital punishments. Other sources state that the execution is to be by stoning if he has intercourse with a Jewish betrothed woman, or by strangulation if the Jewish woman has completed the marriage ceremonies, but had not yet consummated the marriage. In Jewish law, the only form of blasphemy which is punishable by death is blaspheming the Ineffable Name (Leviticus 24:16). Some Talmudic rabbis held that only those offences for which a Jew would be executed, are forbidden to gentiles. The Talmudic rabbis discuss which offences and sub-offences are capital offences and which are merely forbidden.

Maimonides states that a non-Jew under Jewish authority who does not accept the seven Noahide laws is to be executed, as God compelled the world to follow these laws. However, a non-Jew who does not desire to convert to Judaism should not be forced to.

For the other prohibitions such as the grafting of trees and bestiality he holds that the sons of Noah are not to be executed. Maimonides adds a universalism lacking from earlier Jewish sources. The Talmud differs from Maimonides in that it considers the seven laws enforceable by Jewish authorities on non-Jews living within a Jewish nation.

Nahmanides disagrees with Maimonides' reasoning. He limits the obligation of enforcing the seven laws to non-Jewish authorities, thus taking the matter out of Jewish hands. The Tosafot seems to agree with Nahmanides' reasoning. According to some opinions, punishment is the same whether the individual transgresses with knowledge of the law or is ignorant of the law.

Some authorities debate whether non-Jewish societies may decide to modify the Noahide laws of evidence (for example, by requiring more witnesses before punishment, or by permitting circumstantial evidence) if they consider that to be more just. Whilst Jewish law requires two witnesses, Noachide law, as recorded by Rambam, Hilkhot Melakhim 9:14, can accept the testimony of a single eyewitness as sufficient for use of the death penalty. Whilst a confession of guilt is not admissible as evidence before a Jewish court, it is a matter of considerable dispute as to whether or not it constitutes sufficient grounds for conviction in Noachide courts.

There is also some debate as to whether the ideal punishment for violation of these laws is the death penalty, or if it is up to the court's discretion to decide which punishment is most fitting. While a simple reading of the Talmud might suggest that the ideal punishment is the death penalty, a number of prominent commentators, including Rav Yosef Eliyahu Henkin, have argued that it is up to the courts to decide.

=== Subdivisions ===
Various rabbinic sources have different positions on the way the seven laws are to be subdivided in categories. Maimonides, in his Mishneh Torah, included the grafting of trees. Like the Talmud, he interpreted the prohibition against homicide as including a prohibition against abortion. David ben Solomon ibn Abi Zimra, a commentator on Maimonides, expressed surprise that he left out castration and sorcery which were also listed in the Talmud.

Maimonides also indicates that the descendants of Ishmael and Keturah are obligated to circumcise themselves on the eighth day, but are not punished for failing to do so.

The Talmudist Ulla wrote of 30 laws which the sons of Noah took upon themselves. He only lists three, namely the three that the gentiles follow: not to create a Ketubah between males, not to sell carrion or human flesh in the market and to respect the Torah. The rest of the laws are not listed. Though the authorities seem to take it for granted that Ulla's thirty commandments included the original seven, an additional thirty laws are also possible from the reading.

Two different lists of the 30 laws exist. Both lists include an additional twenty-three mitzvot which are subdivisions or extensions of the seven laws. One from the 16th-century work Asarah Maamarot by Rabbi Menahem Azariah da Fano and a second from the 10th century Samuel ben Hofni which was recently published from his Judeo-Arabic writings after having been found in the Cairo Geniza. Rabbi Zvi Hirsch Chajes suggests Menahem Azariah of Fano enumerated commandments are not related to the first seven, nor based on the written Torah, but instead were passed down by oral tradition.

=== Ger toshav (resident alien) ===
During biblical times, a Gentile living in the Land of Israel who did not want to convert to Judaism but accepted the Seven Laws of Noah as binding upon himself was granted the legal status of ger toshav (Hebrew: גר תושב, ger: "foreigner" or "alien" + toshav: "resident", lit. "resident alien"). A ger toshav is therefore commonly deemed a "Righteous Gentile" (Hebrew: חסיד אומות העולם, Chassid Umot ha-Olam: "Pious People of the World"), and is assured of a place in the World to Come (Olam Ha-Ba).

The rabbinic regulations regarding Jewish–Gentile relations are modified in the case of a ger toshav. The accepted halakhic opinion is that the ger toshav must accept the seven Noahide laws in the presence of three haberim (men of authority), or, according to the rabbinic tradition, before a beth din (Jewish rabbinical court). He will receive certain legal protection and privileges from the Jewish community, and there is an obligation to render him aid when in need. The restrictions on having a Gentile do work for a Jew on the Shabbat are also greater when the Gentile is a ger toshav.

According to the Jewish philosopher and professor Menachem Kellner's study on Maimonidean texts (1991), a ger toshav could be a transitional stage on the way to becoming a "righteous alien" (Hebrew: גר צדק, ger tzedek), i.e. a full convert to Judaism. He conjectures that, according to Maimonides, only a full ger tzedek would be found during the Messianic era. Furthermore, Kellner criticizes the assumption within Orthodox Judaism that there is an "ontological divide between Jews and Gentiles", which he believes is contrary to what Maimonides thought and the Torah teaches, stating that "Gentiles as well as Jews are fully created in the image of God".

According to Christine Hayes, an American scholar of ancient Judaism and early Christianity serving as the Sterling Professor of Religious Studies in Classical Judaica at Yale University, the gerim were not necessarily Gentile converts in the Hebrew Bible, whether in the modern or rabbinic sense. Nonetheless, they were granted many rights and privileges when they lived in the Land of Israel. For example, they could offer sacrifices, actively participate in Israelite politics, keep their distinct ethnic identity for many generations, inherit tribal allotments, etc.

=== Maimonides' view and his critics ===
During the Golden Age of Jewish culture in the Iberian Peninsula, the medieval Jewish philosopher and rabbi Maimonides (1135–1204) wrote in the halakhic legal code Mishneh Torah (tractate Hilkhot Melakhim) that Gentiles (non-Jews) must perform exclusively the Seven Laws of Noah and might study their Seven Laws. He also states that if Gentiles willingly perform any commandment besides the Seven Laws of Noah - like charity or a sacrifice (Korban) - according to the correct halakhic procedure, they are not prevented from doing so. However, Gentiles are forbidden to rest on the Shabbat.

According to Maimonides, teaching non-Jews to follow the Seven Laws of Noah is incumbent on all Jews, a commandment in and of itself. Nevertheless, the majority of rabbinic authorities over the centuries have rejected Maimonides' opinion, and the dominant halakhic consensus has always been that Jews are not required to spread the Noahide laws to non-Jews.

Maimonides held that Gentiles may have a part in the World to Come (Olam Ha-Ba) just by observing the Seven Laws of Noah and accepting them as divinely revealed to Moses. According to Maimonides, such non-Jews achieve the status of Chassid Umot Ha-Olam ("Pious People of the World"), and are different from those which solely keep the Noahide laws out of moral/ethical reasoning alone. He wrote in Hilkhot M'lakhim:"

Anyone who accepts upon himself and carefully observes the Seven Commandments is of the Righteous of the Nations of the World and has a portion in the World to Come. This is as long as he accepts and performs them because (he truly believes that) it was the Holy One, Blessed Be He, Who commanded them in the Torah, and that it was through Moses our Teacher we were informed that the Sons of Noah had already been commanded to observe them. But if he observes them because he convinced himself, then he is not considered a Resident Convert and is not of the Righteous of the Nations of the World, but merely one of their wise.

Some later editions of the Mishneh Torah differ by one letter and read "Nor one of their wise men"; the latter reading is narrower. In either reading, Maimonides appears to exclude philosophical Noahides from being "Righteous Gentiles". According to him, a truly "Righteous Gentile" follows the seven laws because they are divinely revealed, and thus are followed out of obedience to God.

The 15th-century Sephardic Orthodox rabbi Yosef Caro, one of the early Acharonim and author of the Shulchan Aruch, rejected Maimonides' denial of the access to the World to Come to the Gentiles who obey the Noahide laws guided only by their reason as anti-rationalistic and unfounded, asserting that there is not any justification to uphold such a view in the Talmud. The 17th-century Sephardic Dutch philosopher Baruch Spinoza read Maimonides as saying "nor one of their wise men", and accused him of being narrow and particularistic. Other Jewish philosophers influenced by Spinoza, such as Moses Mendelssohn and Hermann Cohen, also have formulated more inclusive and universal interpretations of the Seven Laws of Noah.

The 18th-century Ashkenazi German philosopher Moses Mendelssohn, one of the leading exponents of the Jewish Enlightenment (Haskalah), strongly disagreed with Maimonides' formulation of the subject in the Mishneh Torah (tractate Hilkhot Melakhim), citing a letter sent by Maimonides to the Jewish translator Abraham ben Samuel ibn Hasdai ha-Levi of Barcelona, and instead contended that, in conformity to the letter itself, Gentiles which observe the seven Noahide laws out of ethical, moral, or philosophical reasoning, without necessarily believing in the Jewish monotheistic conception of God or knowing the Torah, retained the status of "Righteous Gentiles" and would still achieve salvation.

According to Steven Schwarzschild, Maimonides' position has its source in his adoption of Aristotle's skeptical attitude towards the ability of reason to arrive at moral truths, and "many of the most outstanding spokesmen of Judaism themselves dissented sharply from" this position, which is "individual and certainly somewhat eccentric" in comparison to other Jewish thinkers.

The 20th-century Ashkenazi Orthodox rabbi Abraham Isaac Kook, first Chief Rabbi of the British Mandate of Palestine, cited many rabbinical authorities in ruling leniently that a non-Jew who follows the seven commandments due to philosophical conviction rather than revelation (what Maimonides calls "one of their wise men") would also have a part in the World to Come (Olam Ha-Ba). This would be in line with Maimonides' general approach, he said, that following philosophical wisdom spiritually "advances an individual even more than righteous behaviour".

=== Modern Noahide movement ===
Menachem Mendel Schneerson encouraged his followers on many occasions to preach the Seven Laws of Noah, devoting some of his addresses to the subtleties of this code. Since the 1990s, Orthodox Jewish rabbis from Israel, most notably those affiliated to Chabad-Lubavitch and religious Zionist organizations, including The Temple Institute, have set up a modern Noahide movement. These Noahide organizations, led by religious Zionist and Orthodox rabbis, are aimed at non-Jews to proselytize among them and commit them to follow the Noahide laws.

These religious Zionist and Orthodox rabbis that guide the modern Noahide movement, who are often affiliated with the Third Temple movement, are accused of expounding a racist and supremacist ideology which consists in the belief that the Jewish people are God's chosen nation and racially superior to non-Jews, and mentor Noahides because they believe that the Messianic era will begin with the rebuilding of the Third Temple on the Temple Mount in Jerusalem to re-institute the Jewish priesthood along with the practice of ritual sacrifices, and the establishment of a Jewish theocracy in Israel, supported by communities of Noahides.

In 1990, Meir Kahane, a convicted terrorist and founder of the Israeli ultra-nationalist political party Kach, was the keynote speaker at the First International Conference of the Descendants of Noah, the first Noahide gathering, in Fort Worth, Texas. After the assassination of Meir Kahane that same year, The Temple Institute, which advocates rebuilding the Third Jewish Temple on the Temple Mount in Jerusalem, started to promote the Noahide laws as well.

=== Public recognition ===
The Chabad-Lubavitch movement has been one of the most active in Noahide outreach, believing that there is spiritual and societal value for non-Jews in at least simply acknowledging the Noahide laws.

In 1982, Chabad-Lubavitch had a reference to the Noahide laws enshrined in a U.S. Presidential proclamation: the "Proclamation 4921", signed by the U.S. President Ronald Reagan. The United States Congress, recalling House Joint Resolution 447 and in celebration of Schneerson's 80th birthday, proclaimed 4 April 1982, as a "National Day of Reflection".

In 1989 and 1990, Chabad-Lubavitch had another reference to the Noahide laws enshrined in a U.S. presidential proclamation: the "Proclamation 5956", signed by then-U.S. President George H. W. Bush. The United States Congress, recalling House Joint Resolution 173 and in celebration of Schneerson's 87th birthday, proclaimed 16 April 1989, and 6 April 1990, as "Education Day, U.S.A."

In January 2004, the spiritual leader of the Druze community in Israel, Sheikh Mowafak Tarif, met with a representative of Chabad-Lubavitch to sign a declaration calling on all non-Jews in Israel to observe the Noahide laws; the mayor of the Arab city of Shefa-'Amr (Shfaram) – where Muslim, Christian, and Druze communities live side-by-side – also signed the document.

In March 2016, the Sephardic Chief Rabbi of Israel, Yitzhak Yosef, declared during a sermon that Jewish law requires that only non-Jews who follow the Noahide laws are allowed to live in Israel: "According to Jewish law, it's forbidden for a non-Jew to live in the Land of Israel – unless he has accepted the seven Noahide laws, [...] If the non-Jew is unwilling to accept these laws, then we can send him to Saudi Arabia, ... When there will be full, true redemption, we will do this."

Yosef further added: "non-Jews shouldn't live in the land of Israel. ... If our hand were firm, if we had the power to rule, then non-Jews must not live in Israel. But, our hand is not firm. [...] Who, otherwise be the servants? Who will be our helpers? This is why we leave them in Israel." Yosef's sermon sparked outrage in Israel and was fiercely criticized by several human rights associations, NGOs and members of the Knesset; Jonathan Greenblatt, Anti-Defamation League's CEO and national director, and Carole Nuriel, Anti-Defamation League's Israel Office acting director, issued a strong denunciation of Yosef's sermon:

The statement by Chief Rabbi Yosef is shocking and unacceptable. It is unconscionable that the Chief Rabbi, an official representative of the State of Israel, would express such intolerant and ignorant views about Israel's non-Jewish population – including the millions of non-Jewish citizens.
As a spiritual leader, Rabbi Yosef should be using his influence to preach tolerance and compassion towards others, regardless of their faith, and not seek to exclude and demean a large segment of Israelis.
We call upon the Chief Rabbi to retract his statements and apologize for any offense caused by his comments.

=== Contemporary status ===
Historically, some rabbinic opinions consider non-Jews not only not obliged to adhere to all the remaining laws of the Torah, but actually forbidden from observing them.

Noahide law differs radically from Roman law for gentiles (Jus Gentium), if only because the latter was enforceable judicial policy. Rabbinic Judaism has never adjudicated any cases under the Noahide laws, and Jewish scholars disagree about whether the Noahide laws are a functional part of the Halakha (Jewish law).

Some modern views hold that penalties are a detail of the Noahide Laws and that Noahides themselves must determine the details of their own laws for themselves. According to this school of thought – see N. Rakover, Law and the Noahides (1998); M. Dallen, The Rainbow Covenant (2003) – the Noahide laws offer humankind a set of absolute values and a framework for righteousness and justice, while the detailed laws that are currently on the books of the world's states and nations are presumptively valid.

In recent years, the term "Noahide" has come to refer to non-Jews who strive to live in accord with the seven Noahide Laws; the terms "observant Noahide" or "Torah-centered Noahides" would be more precise but these are infrequently used. Support for the use of "Noahide" in this sense can be found with the Ritva, who uses the term Son of Noah to refer to a gentile who keeps the seven laws, but is not a ger toshav.

== Early Christianity ==
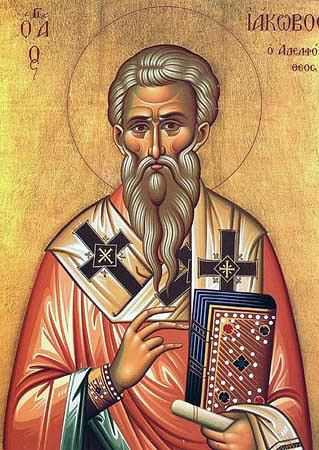
James the Just, whose judgment was adopted in the Apostolic Decree of Acts 15:20: "but we should write to them [gentiles] to abstain only from things polluted by idols and from fornication and from whatever has been strangled and from blood." (NRSV)

In the history of Christianity, the Apostolic Decree recorded in Acts 15 is commonly seen as a parallel to the Seven Laws of Noah, and thus be a commonality rather than a differential. Some modern scholars dispute the connection between Acts 15 and the seven Noahide laws. The Apostolic Decree is still observed by the Eastern Orthodox Church and includes some food restrictions.

According to the Jewish Encyclopedia, the Christian apostle and missionary Paul of Tarsus initially focused his missionary work on Jewish communities in the Diaspora. However, when a portion of his Jewish audience rejected or opposed his message, he turned to non-Jewish populations. In doing so, he appears to have followed a proselytizing practice already present in the Judaism of that era, specifically reaching out to non-Jewish pagans to admit them into the church as "proselytes of the gate"—that is, after they had accepted the Noahide Laws (Acts 15:1–31).

The article on the New Testament states:

For great as was the success of Barnabas and Paul in the heathen world, the authorities in Jerusalem insisted upon circumcision as the condition of admission of members into the Church, until, on the initiative of Peter, and of James, the head of the Jerusalem church, it was agreed that acceptance of the Noachian Laws—namely, regarding avoidance of idolatry, fornication, and the eating of flesh cut from a living animal—should be demanded of the heathen desirous of entering the Church.

The 18th-century rabbi Jacob Emden hypothesized that Jesus, and Paul after him, intended to convert the gentiles to the Seven Laws of Noah while calling on the Jews to keep the full Law of Moses.

== See also ==
- Code of Hammurabi
- Ethical monotheism
- Forbidden relationships in Judaism
- God-fearers
- Interfaith dialogue
- Israeli citizenship law
- Jewish Christianity
  - Judaizers
  - Judeo-Christian
  - Messianic Jews
  - Subbotniks
- Jewish outreach
- Judaism and environmentalism
- List of ancient legal codes
- Natural law
- Noahidism
- Proselytization and counter-proselytization of Jews
  - Jews for Jesus
  - New Christians
- Relations between Judaism and Christianity
  - British Israelism
  - Catholic Church and Judaism
  - Christian Zionism
  - Eastern Orthodoxy and Judaism
  - Jewish views on Jesus
    - Jesus in the Talmud
    - Rejection of Jesus
  - Protestantism and Judaism
- Relations between Judaism and Islam
- Righteous among the Nations
- Ritual Decalogue
- Shituf
- Sons of Noah
- State of nature
- Ten Commandments
- Zera Yisrael
