= Ger toshav =

Non-Jewish resident in the Land of Israel

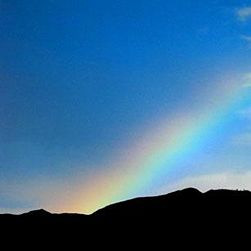
The rainbow is the unofficial symbol of Noahidism, recalling the Genesis flood narrative in which a rainbow appears to Noah after the Flood; it represents God's promise to Noah to refrain from flooding the Earth and destroying all life again.

Ger toshav (Hebrew: גר תושב, ger: "foreigner" + toshav: "resident", lit. 'resident alien') is a halakhic term used in Judaism to designate the legal status of a Gentile (non-Jew) living in the Land of Israel who does not want to convert to Judaism but agrees to observe the Seven Laws of Noah, a set of imperatives which, according to the Talmud, were given by God as a binding set of universal moral laws for the "sons of Noah"—that is, all of humanity.

A ger toshav, especially one who decides to follow the Noahic covenant out of religious belief rather than ethical reasoning, is commonly deemed a "Righteous Gentile" (Hebrew: חסיד אומות העולם, Chassid Umot ha-Olam: "Pious People of the World"), and is assured of a place in the World to Come (Olam Ha-Ba).

== Definition ==
A ger toshav ("resident alien") is a Gentile (non-Jew) living in the Land of Israel who agrees to follow the Seven Laws of Noah. The theological basis for the seven commandments of the Noahic Covenant is said to be derived interpretatively from demands addressed to Adam and to Noah, who are believed to be the progenitors of humankind in Judaism, and therefore to be regarded as universal moral laws. The seven commandments of the Noahic Covenant to which the ger toshav agrees to be bound are enumerated in the Babylonian Talmud (Avodah Zarah 8:4, Sanhedrin 56a-b):

1. Do not worship idols.
2. Do not curse God.
3. Do not murder.
4. Do not commit adultery or sexual immorality.
5. Do not steal.
6. Do not eat flesh torn from a living animal.
7. Establish courts of justice.

The Encyclopedia Talmudit, edited by rabbi Shlomo Yosef Zevin, states that after the giving of the Torah, the Jewish people were no longer included in the category of the sons of Noah; however, Maimonides (Mishneh Torah, Hilkhot M'lakhim 9:1) indicates that the seven commandments are also part of the Torah, and the Babylonian Talmud (Sanhedrin 59a, see also Tosafot ad. loc.) states that Jews are obligated in all things that Gentiles are obligated in, albeit with some differences in the details. According to the Encyclopedia Talmudit, most medieval Jewish authorities considered that all the seven commandments were given to Adam, although Maimonides (Mishneh Torah, Hilkhot M'lakhim 9:1) considered the dietary law to have been given to Noah.

The term ger toshav may be used in a formal or informal sense. In the formal sense, a ger toshav is a Gentile who officially accepts the seven Noahide laws as binding upon themself in the presence of three haberim (men of authority), or, according to the rabbinic tradition, before a beth din (Jewish rabbinical court). In the Talmud there are two other, differing opinions (Avodah Zarah, 64b) that pertain to which commandments the ger toshav is required to follow:

1. To abstain from idolatrous practices of any kind (detailed in Exodus 20:2–4 and Deuteronomy 5:6–8).
2. To uphold all the 613 Jewish commandments in rabbinical enumeration, except for the prohibition against eating kosher animals that died by means other than ritual slaughter, or possibly (Meiri) any prohibition not involving kareth.

The accepted opinion is that the ger toshav must accept the Seven Laws of Noah before a rabbinical court of three. They will receive certain legal protection and privileges from the community, the rules regarding Jewish-Gentile relations are modified, and there is an obligation to render him aid when in need. The restrictions on having a Gentile do work for a Jew on the Shabbat are also greater when the Gentile is a ger toshav.

In the informal sense, a ger toshav is a Gentile who agrees to follow the seven Noahide laws on his own, or alternatively, simply rejects idolatry (the latter issue is in particular brought up regarding Muslims). According to the rabbinic tradition, a Gentile who agrees to follow the seven Noahide laws, although not before a beth din, is still regarded as Chassid Umot ha-Olam ("Pious People of the World"), and the observance of the Seven Laws of Noah grants them a place in the World to Come (Olam Ha-Ba). There is a debate among the halakhic authorities as to whether the rules regarding a ger toshav would apply to the informal case. The procedure to officially recognize the legal status of ger toshav has been discontinued since the cessation of the year of Jubilee with the destruction of the Second Temple of Jerusalem; hence, there are no formal gerim toshavim extant today. However, it can be argued that a great deal are "informal" ones, especially since it is possible to be a Chassid Umot ha-Olam even when the Jubilee year is not observed.

== History ==
The Talmudic tractate Sanhedrin 105a named and excluded certain specific Jewish and non-Jewish groups of the distant past from salvation, but thereby implied, as explicitly stated there, that all other non-Jews of past or present could be righteous and would be saved as they were, without Gentiles needing to undergo conversion to Judaism. Following Moses Maimonides' analysis of Islam, medieval Jewish rabbis affirmed that Islam as an entire religion, despite its perceived errors and cruelties towards the Jews, could still be considered as a Noahide faith, and the 13th–14th century Catalan rabbi Menachem ben Solomon Ha-Meiri fully extended much the same status to Christianity itself.

The Talmud has some striking accounts illustrating how far God's lovingkindness and mercies might extend, giving ultimate salvation even to persons who had led notoriously evil lives: some said that if those persons had done only one truly selfless, kind and good deed in their entire lives God would accept them for the sake of that precious act into Paradise, either immediately at death (if their death was the result of an extraordinarily generous, self-sacrificing, or courageous deed) or after they had atoned for their sins in Purgatory—so it is evident that full observance of the Noahide covenant itself was not always obligatory for salvation after all, even if it remained the chief guide to lives of spiritual loftiness and nobility. This led the 18th-century Italian Jewish Kabbalist and rabbi Moshe Chaim Luzzatto to emphasize and explain at length that God would end up accepting all humanity, good and evil alike, into the World to Come (Olam Ha-Ba)—the evil ones, however, would of course need to purify themselves in Purgatory first, but there will be no eternal punishment for them.

For this reason you will find that the Noachian and the Mosaic laws, though differing in matters of detail, as we shall see, agree in the general matters which come from the giver. They both existed at the same time. While the Mosaic law existed in Israel, all the other nations had the Noachian law, and the difference was due to geographical diversity, Israel being different from the other lands, and to national diversity, due to difference in ancestry. And there is no doubt that the other nations attained human happiness through the Noachian law, since it is divine; though they could not reach the same degree of happiness as that attained by Israel through the Torah. The rabbis say: "The pious men of the other nations have a share in the world to come". This shows that there may be two divine laws existing at the same time among different nations, and that each one leads those who live by it to attain human happiness; though there is a difference in the degree of happiness attainable by the two laws. This difference in the laws can not concern fundamental or derivative principles. Therefore the examination of the law itself is always of the same kind. But the examination relating to the messenger may undergo change. At all events the verification must be direct, though the verification of one religion may be different from that of another.

— Yosef Albo, Maamar 1, Chapter 25:5, Sefer ha-Ikkarim, Castille (1425 CE)

During the 1860s in Western Europe, a resurgence of Noahide faith as the universal moral religion for Gentiles (non-Jews) was developed by the 19th-century Italian Jewish Kabbalist and rabbi Elijah Benamozegh. Between the years 1920s–1930s, French writer Aimé Pallière adopted the Seven Laws of Noah at the suggestion of his teacher Elijah Benamozegh; afterwards, Pallière spread Benamozegh's doctrine in Europe and never formally converted to Judaism. Modern historians argue that Benamozegh's role in the debate on Jewish universalism in the history of Jewish philosophy was focused on the Noahide laws for Gentiles as the means subservient to the shift of Jewish ethics from particularism to universalism, although the arguments that he used to support his universalistic viewpoint were neither original nor unheard in the history of this debate. According to Clémence Boulouque, Carl and Bernice Witten Associate Professor of Jewish and Israel Studies at Columbia University in the City of New York, Benamozegh ignored the ethnocentric biases contained in the Noahide laws, whereas some contemporary right-wing Jewish political movements have embraced them.

The Encyclopedia Talmudit, edited by the 20th-century Belarusian Hasidic rabbi Shlomo Yosef Zevin, states that after the giving of the Torah, the Jewish people were no longer included in the category of the sons of Noah. Maimonides (Mishneh Torah, Hilkhot Melakhim 9:1) indicates that the seven commandments are also part of the Torah, and the Babylonian Talmud (Sanhedrin 59a, see also Tosafot ad. loc.) states that Jews are obligated in all things that Gentiles are obligated in, albeit with some differences in the details. According to the Encyclopedia Talmudit, most medieval Jewish authorities considered that all the seven commandments were given to Adam, although Maimonides (Mishneh Torah, Hilkhot Melakhim 9:1) considered the dietary law to have been given to Noah.

Menachem Mendel Schneerson, the Lubavitcher Rebbe, published and spoke about the Seven Laws of Noah many times. According to Schneerson's view, based on a detailed reading of Maimonides' tractate Hilkhot Melakhim in the Mishneh Torah, the Talmud, and the Hebrew Bible, the seven commandments originally given to Noah were given yet again, through Moses at Sinai, and it's exclusively through the giving of the Torah that the seven commandments derive their current force. What has changed with the giving of the Torah is that now, it is the duty of the Jewish people to bring the rest of the world to fulfill the Seven Laws of Noah.

== Modern times and views ==
Menachem Mendel Schneerson, the Lubavitcher Rebbe, encouraged his followers on many occasions to preach the Seven Laws of Noah, devoting some of his addresses to the subtleties of this code. Since the 1990s, Orthodox Jewish rabbis from Israel, most notably those affiliated to Chabad-Lubavitch and religious Zionist organizations, including The Temple Institute, have set up a modern Noahide movement. These Noahide organizations, led by religious Zionist and Orthodox Jewish rabbis, are aimed at non-Jews in order to proselytize among them and commit them to follow the Noahide laws. According to Rachel Z. Feldman, American anthropologist and Assistant Professor of Religious Studies at Dartmouth College, many of the Orthodox Jewish rabbis involved in mentoring Noahides are supporters of the Third Temple movement who believe that the messianic era shall begin with the establishment of a Jewish theocratic state in Israel, supported by communities of Noahides worldwide:

Today, nearly 2,000 Filipinos consider themselves members of the "Children of Noah", a new Judaic faith that is growing into the tens of thousands worldwide as ex-Christians encounter forms of Jewish learning online. Under the tutelage of Orthodox Jewish rabbis, Filipino "Noahides", as they call themselves, study Torah, observe the Sabbath, and passionately support a form of messianic Zionism. Filipino Noahides believe that Jews are a racially superior people, with an innate ability to access divinity. According to their rabbi mentors, they are forbidden from performing Jewish rituals and even reading certain Jewish texts. These restrictions have necessitated the creation of new, distinctly Noahide ritual practices and prayers modeled after Jewish ones. Filipino Noahides are practicing a new faith that also affirms the superiority of Judaism and Jewish biblical right to the Land of Israel, in line with the aims of the growing messianic Third Temple Movement in Jerusalem.

Feldman describes Noahidism as a "new world religion" that "carv[es] out a place for non-Jews in the messianic Zionist project" and "affirms the superiority of Judaism and Jewish biblical right to the Land of Israel, in line with the aims of the growing messianic Third Temple Movement in Jerusalem." She characterizes Noahide ideology in the Philippines and elsewhere in the global south as having a "markedly racial dimension" constructed around "an essential categorical difference between Jews and Noahides". David Novak, professor of Jewish theology and ethics at the University of Toronto, has denounced the modern Noahide movement by stating that "If Jews are telling Gentiles what to do, it’s a form of imperialism".

According to the Jewish philosopher and professor Menachem Kellner's study on Maimonidean texts (1991), a ger toshav could be a transitional stage on the way to becoming a "righteous alien" (Hebrew: גר צדק, ger tzedek), i.e. a full convert to Judaism. He conjectures that, according to Maimonides, only a full ger tzedek would be found during the Messianic era. Furthermore, Kellner criticizes the assumption within Orthodox Judaism that there is an "ontological divide between Jews and Gentiles", which he believes is contrary to what Maimonides thought and the Torah teaches, stating that "Gentiles as well as Jews are fully created in the image of God".

According to Menachem Mendel Schneerson, the status of ger toshav will continue to exist, even in the Messianic era. This is based on the statement in Hilkhot M'lakhim 12:5 that lit. “all the world (kol ha'olam) will be nothing but to know G‑d." In its plain meaning, he asserts, kol ha'olam also includes Gentiles. As proof, he cites 11:4, which deals with the Messianic era, and the similar term ha'olam kulo, "the world in its entirety", refers to Gentiles. Continuing the text in Hilkhot M'lakhim 12:5, Maimonides explicitly changes the topic to Jews by using the term Yisra'el, explaining that "Therefore, the Jews will be great sages and know the hidden matters, grasping the knowledge of their Creator according to the full extent of human potential", indicating that Jews and Gentiles will co-exist in the time of the Messiah. In any case, even when there is a Jewish king and a Sanhedrin, and all the twelve tribes live in the Land of Israel, Jewish law does not permit forcing someone to convert and become a ger tzedek against his will.

=== High Council of Bnei Noah ===
A "High Council of Bnei Noah", set up to represent Noahide communities around the world, was endorsed by a group that claimed to be the new Sanhedrin. The High Council of Bnei Noah consists of a group of Noahides who, at the request of the nascent Sanhedrin, gathered in Jerusalem on 10 January 2006 to be recognized as an international Noahide organization for the purpose of serving as a bridge between the nascent Sanhedrin and Noahides worldwide. There were ten initial members who flew to Israel and pledged to uphold the Seven Laws of Noah and to conduct themselves under the authority of the Noahide beth din (religious court) of the nascent Sanhedrin.

=== Non-necessity of conversion ===
According to Christine Hayes, an American scholar of ancient Judaism and early Christianity serving as the Sterling Professor of Religious Studies in Classical Judaica at Yale University, the gerim were not necessarily Gentile converts in the Hebrew Bible, whether in the modern or rabbinic sense. Nonetheless, they were granted many rights and privileges when they lived in the Land of Israel. For example, they could offer sacrifices, actively participate in Israelite politics, keep their distinct ethnic identity for many generations, inherit tribal allotments, etc.

== See also ==
- Am ha-aretz
- Conversion to Judaism
- Ethical monotheism
- Forbidden relationships in Judaism
- God-fearers
- Interfaith dialogue
- Israeli citizenship law
- Jewish Christianity
  - Judaizers
  - Judeo-Christian
  - Messianic Jews
  - Subbotniks
- Jewish outreach
- Judaism and environmentalism
- List of ancient legal codes
- Natural law
- Proselytization and counter-proselytization of Jews
  - Jews for Jesus
  - New Christians
- Relations between Judaism and Christianity
  - British Israelism
  - Catholic Church and Judaism
  - Christian Zionism
  - Eastern Orthodoxy and Judaism
  - Protestantism and Judaism
- Relations between Judaism and Islam
  - Dhimmi, similar concept in Islam
  - Shituf, similar concept in Islam
- Righteous Among the Nations
- Ritual Decalogue
- Sons of Noah
- State of nature
- Ten Commandments
- Virtuous pagan, similar concept in Christianity
- Zera Yisrael

== Bibliography ==
- "Jewish Concepts: The Seven Noachide Laws". Jewish Virtual Library. American–Israeli Cooperative Enterprise (AICE). 2021 [2017]. Archived from the original on 10 February 2017.
- Adler, Elchanan (Fall 2002). "The Sabbath Observing Gentile: Halakhic, Hashkafic, and Liturgical Perspectives". Tradition: A Journal of Orthodox Jewish Thought. 36 (3). Rabbinical Council of America: 14–45. JSTOR 23262836.
- Berlin, Meyer; Zevin, Shlomo Yosef, eds. (1992) [1969]. "BEN NOAH". Encyclopedia Talmudica: A Digest of Halachic Literature and Jewish Law from the Tannaitic Period to the Present Time, Alphabetically Arranged. Vol. IV. Jerusalem: Yad Harav Herzog (Emet). pp. 360–380. ISBN 0873067142.
- Bleich, J. David (1988). "Judaism and Natural Law". In Hecht, Neils S. (ed.). Jewish Law Annual. Vol. 7. Abingdon, Oxfordshire: Routledge. pp. 5–42. ISBN 9783718604807.
- Bleich, J. David (1997). "Tikkun Olam: Jewish Obligations to Non-Jewish Society". In Shatz, David; Waxman, Chaim I.; Diament, Nathan J. (eds.). Tikkun Olam: Social Responsibility in Jewish Thought and Law. Northvale, NJ: Jason Aronson Inc. pp. 61–102. ISBN 978-0-765-75951-1.
- Feldman, Rachel Z. (8 October 2017). "The Bnei Noah (Children of Noah)". World Religions and Spirituality Project.
- van Houten, Christiana (2009) [1991]. The Alien in Israelite Law: A Study of the Changing Legal Status of Strangers in Ancient Israel. The Library of Hebrew Bible/Old Testament Studies. Vol. 107. Sheffield: Sheffield Academic Press. ISBN 978-1-85075-317-9.
- Kiel, Yishai (2015). "Noahide Law and the Inclusiveness of Sexual Ethics: Between Roman Palestine and Sasanian Babylonia". In Porat, Benjamin (ed.). Jewish Law Annual. Vol. 21. Abingdon, Oxfordshire: Routledge. pp. 59–109. ISBN 978-0-415-74269-6.
- Lichtenstein, Aaron (1986) [1981]. The Seven Laws of Noah (2nd ed.). New York: Rabbi Jacob Joseph School Press. ISBN 9781602803671.
- Novak, David (2011) [1983]. The Image of the Non-Jew in Judaism: An Historical and Constructive Study of the Noahide Laws. Littman Library of Jewish Civilization. Toronto: Liverpool University Press. doi:10.2307/j.ctv1rmj9w. ISBN 9781786949820.
- Wasserman, Mira Beth (2019). Crane, Jonathan K.; Filler, Emily (eds.). "Noahide Law, Animal Ethics, and Talmudic Narrative". Journal of Jewish Ethics. 5 (1). University Park, Pennsylvania: Penn State University Press: 40–67. doi:10.5325/jjewiethi.5.1.0040. eISSN 2334-1785. ISSN 2334-1777. LCCN 2014201591. OCLC 1082217204. S2CID 201391432.
- Zevin, Shlomo Yosef, ed. (1979). ""Ger Toshav", Section 1". Encyclopedia Talmudit (in Hebrew) (4th ed.). Jerusalem: Yad Harav Herzog (Emet).
- Zuesse, Evan M. (2006). "Tolerance in Judaism: Medieval and Modern Sources". In Neusner, Jacob; Avery-Peck, Alan J.; Green, William Scott (eds.). Encyclopaedia of Judaism. Vol. IV. Leiden: Brill Publishers. pp. 2688–2713. doi:10.1163/1872-9029_EJ_COM_0187. ISBN 9789004141001.
