= God-fearer =

Greco-Roman sympathizers to Hellenistic Judaism

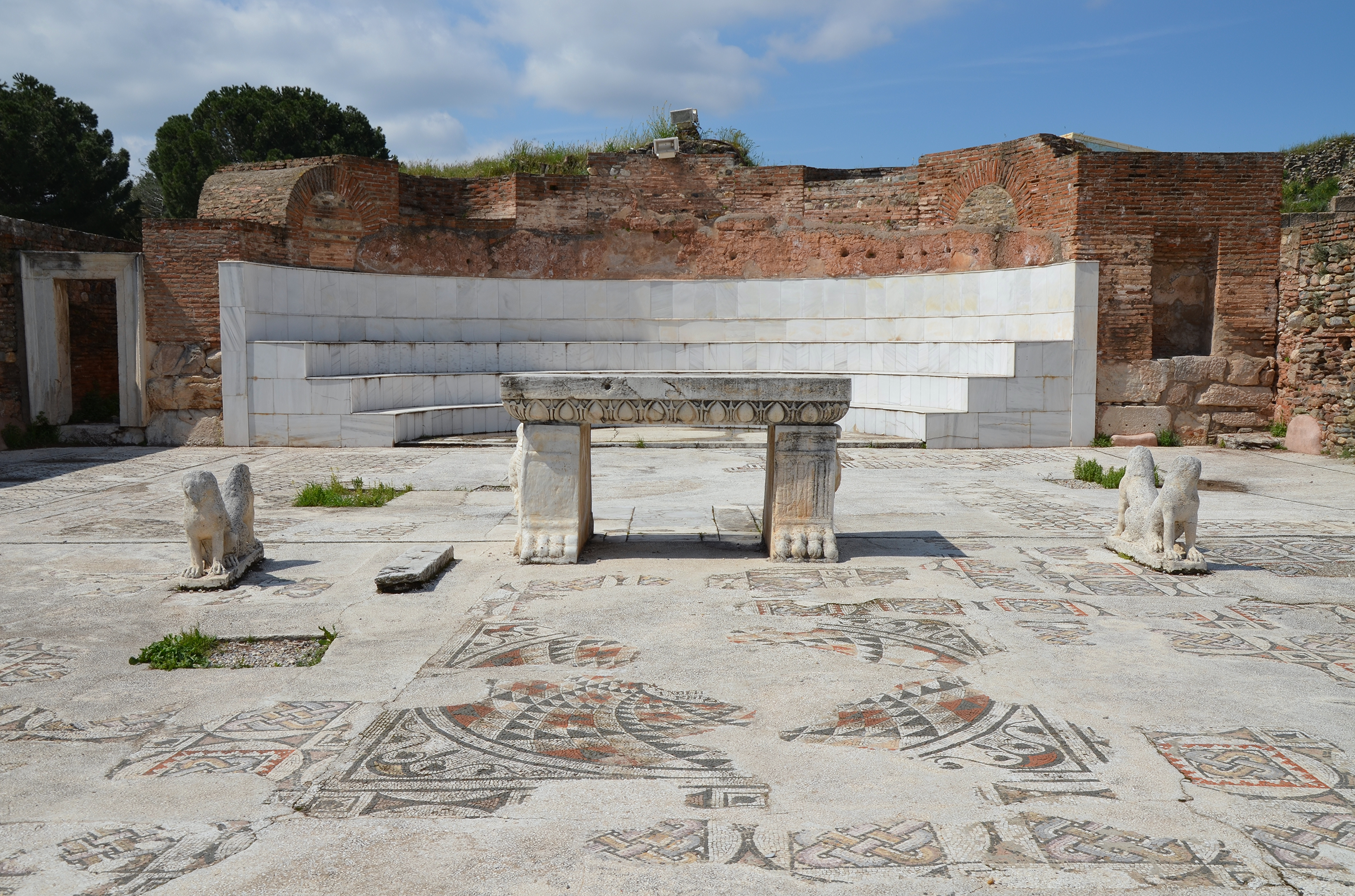
Sardis Synagogue (3rd century, Turkey) had a large community of God-fearers and Jews integrated into the Roman civic life.

God-fearers (Hebrew: יראי השם, romanized: Yirei HaShem, lit. 'fearers [of] the Name'; Koine Greek: φοβούμενοι τὸν Θεόν, romanized: phoboumenoi ton Theon) or God-worshippers (Koine Greek: θεοσεβεῖς, romanized: Theosebeis) were a numerous class of Gentile sympathizers to Hellenistic Judaism that existed in the Greco-Roman world. The group observed certain rites and practices of Second Temple Judaism without becoming full converts to Judaism. The concept has precedents in the proselytes of the Hebrew Bible. Many of these Greco-Roman sympathizers to Hellenistic Judaism were worshippers of Caelus (the Roman equivalent to Yahweh). More generally, God-fearing has come to mean someone who is honestly religious.

== Overview ==
=== Origin, history, status and diffusion ===
Since the mid-1980s, a growing number of scholars of Judaic studies and history of Judaism became interested in the subject of God-fearers and their relationship with Hellenistic Judaism and early Christianity. According to the popular opinion, Jews that lived in the Greco-Roman world during the Hellenistic and Roman period were not involved in active missionary efforts of mass conversion among Pagans, although many historians disagree.

As Jews emigrated and settled in the Roman provinces of the Empire, Judaism became an appealing religion to a number of Pagans, for many reasons; God-fearers and proselytes that underwent full conversion were Greeks or Romans, and came from all social classes: they were mostly women and freedmen (liberti), but there were also artisans, soldiers and few people of high status, like patricians and senators. Despite their allegiance to Judaism, the God-fearers were exempted from paying the "Jewish tax" (fiscus Judaicus).

Martin Goodman stated that Jews converted non-Jews by passively living by example. Non-Jews were given a choice on how to respond. But he notes that some Jews, like the Pharisees, were mostly interested in converting other Jews.

The class of God-fearers existed between the 1st and the 3rd century CE. They are mentioned in Latin and Greek literature, Flavius Josephus' and Philo's historical works, rabbinic literature, early Christian writings, and other contemporary sources such as synagogue inscriptions from Diaspora communities (Palestine, Rome, and Asia Minor).

In the Ancient Greek theatre of Miletus, some sitting places seem to have been reserved for the God fearer.

== Sources ==
=== Hebrew Bible ===
In the Hebrew Bible, there is some recognition of Gentile monotheistic worship as being directed toward the God of the Jews. This forms the category of yir’ei HaShem/yir’ei Shamayim (Hebrew: יראי השם, meaning "Fearers of the Name"/"Fearers of Heaven", "the Name" being a Jewish euphemism for Yahweh, cf. Psalm 115:11). This was developed by later rabbinic literature into the concept of Noahides, i. e. Gentiles that follow the Seven Laws of Noah, which rabbinic writings assigned to the Noahic Covenant.

=== In inscriptions, texts, and papyri ===
The Greek and Latin terms that refer to God-fearers (theosebeis, sebomenoi, phoboumenoi, metuentes) are found in ancient literature (Greek, Roman, and Jewish) and inscriptions discovered in Aphrodisias, Panticapaeum, Tralles, Sardis, Venosa, Lorium (in Rome), Rhodes, Deliler (Philadelphia) and at a theater in Miletus.

Judging from the distinctions in the Acts of the Apostles, it is thought that they did not become gerim tzedekim, which required circumcision, although the evidence across the centuries varies widely and the meaning of the term may have included all kinds of sympathetic Gentiles, proselytes or not. There are also around 300 text references (4th century BCE to 3rd century CE) to a sect of Hypsistarians, some of whom practiced Sabbath and which many scholars see as sympathizers with Judaism related to God-fearers.

=== In early Christian writings ===
In the New Testament and early Christian writings, the Greek terms God-fearers and God-worshippers are used to indicate those Pagans who attached themselves in varying degrees to Hellenistic Judaism without becoming full converts, and are referred to primarily in the Gospel of Luke (7:1–10) and more extensively in the Acts of the Apostles, which describes the Apostolic Age of the 1st century.

So Paul stood up, and motioning with his hand said: "Men of Israel, and you that fear God (οἱ φοβούμενοι τὸν θεόν), listen".

— Acts 13:16 (RSV)

Brethren, sons of the family of Abraham, and those among you that fear God (ἐν ὑμῖν φοβούμενοι τὸν θεόν), to us has been sent the message of this salvation.

— Acts 13:26 (RSV)

=== Archaeology ===
A Greek metrical epitaph discovered in Lorium, northwest of Rome, Italy, commemorates a man named Rufinus as a "God-fearer" who was "learned in the holy Laws and wisdom."

== Role in 1st-century Christianity ==
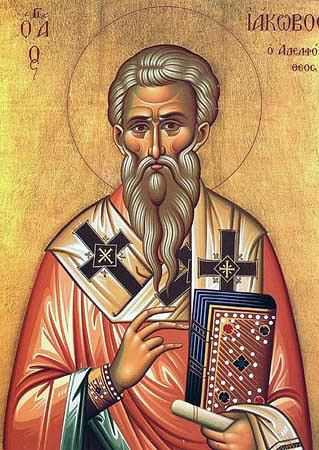
James the Just, whose judgment was adopted in the Apostolic Decree of Acts 15:19–29, c. 78 AD: "we should write to them [Gentiles] to abstain only from things polluted by idols and from fornication and from whatever has been strangled and from blood..." (NRSV)

Judaizing Gentiles and God-fearers are considered by modern scholars to be of significant importance to the growth of early Christianity; they represented a group of Gentiles who shared religious ideas and practices with Jews, to one degree or another. However, the God-fearers were only "partial" converts, engaged in certain Jewish rites and traditions without taking a step further to actual conversion to Judaism, which would have required full adherence to the 613 Mitzvot (including various prohibitions such as kashrut, circumcision, Shabbat observance, etc.) that were generally unattractive to would-be Gentile (largely Greek) converts. The rite of circumcision was especially unappealing and execrable in Classical civilization because it was the custom to spend an hour a day or so exercising nude in the gymnasium and in Roman baths, therefore Jewish men did not want to be seen in public deprived of their foreskins. Hellenistic and Roman culture both found circumcision to be cruel and repulsive.

The Apostle Paul in his letters fiercely criticized the Judaizers that demanded circumcision for Gentile converts, and opposed them; he stressed instead that faith in Christ constituted a New Covenant with God, a covenant which essentially provides the justification and salvation for Gentiles from the harsh edicts of the Mosaic Law, a New Covenant that did not require circumcision (see also Justification by faith, Pauline passages supporting antinomianism, Abrogation of Old Covenant laws). Lydia of Thyatira, who became Paul's first convert to Christianity in Europe, is described in the New Testament as "a worshipper of God" (Acts 16:14); the Roman soldier Cornelius and the Ethiopian eunuch are also considered by modern scholars as God-fearers who converted to Christianity. Nonetheless, American scholar of Jewish studies A. Thomas Kraabel asserts that the God-fearers named in the New Testament (such as Cornelius the Centurion) should be considered as fictional characters in the Acts of the Apostles.

Eventually, the Apostolic Decree issued by James the Just in Jerusalem (c. AD 48–50) decided that Gentiles who converted to Christianity were not obligated to keep most of the rules prescribed to the Jews by the Mosaic Law, such as Jewish dietary laws and other specific rituals, including rules concerning the circumcision of Jewish males. In Paul's message of salvation through faith in Christ as opposed to submission under the Mosaic Law, many God-fearers found an essentially Jewish group to which they could belong without the necessity of their accepting Jewish Law. Aside from earning Paul's group a wide following, this view was generalized in the eventual conclusion that conversion to Christianity doesn't require to follow the Jewish Law, a fact indispensable to the spread of the early Christian communities in the Roman Empire which would eventually lead to the distinction between Judaism and Christianity as two separate religions.

== See also ==
- Biblical law in Christianity
- Council of Jerusalem
- Crypto-Judaism
- Dual-covenant theology
- Fear of God
- Generations of Noah
- Ger toshav
- Heresy in Judaism
- History of early Christianity
  - Anti-Judaism in early Christianity
  - Christianity in the 1st century
  - Jewish Christianity
  - Judaizers
  - Origins of Christianity
  - Paul the Apostle and Jewish Christianity
    - New Perspective on Paul
    - Pauline Christianity
    - Split of early Christianity and Judaism
- Noahidism
  - Seven Laws of Noah
- Origins of Rabbinic Judaism
- Philosemitism
- Religion in ancient Rome
  - Hellenistic religion
    - Hellenistic Judaism
  - Decline of Greco-Roman polytheism
- Sabians
- Supersessionism
