= Avodah Zarah =

Tractate of the Talmud

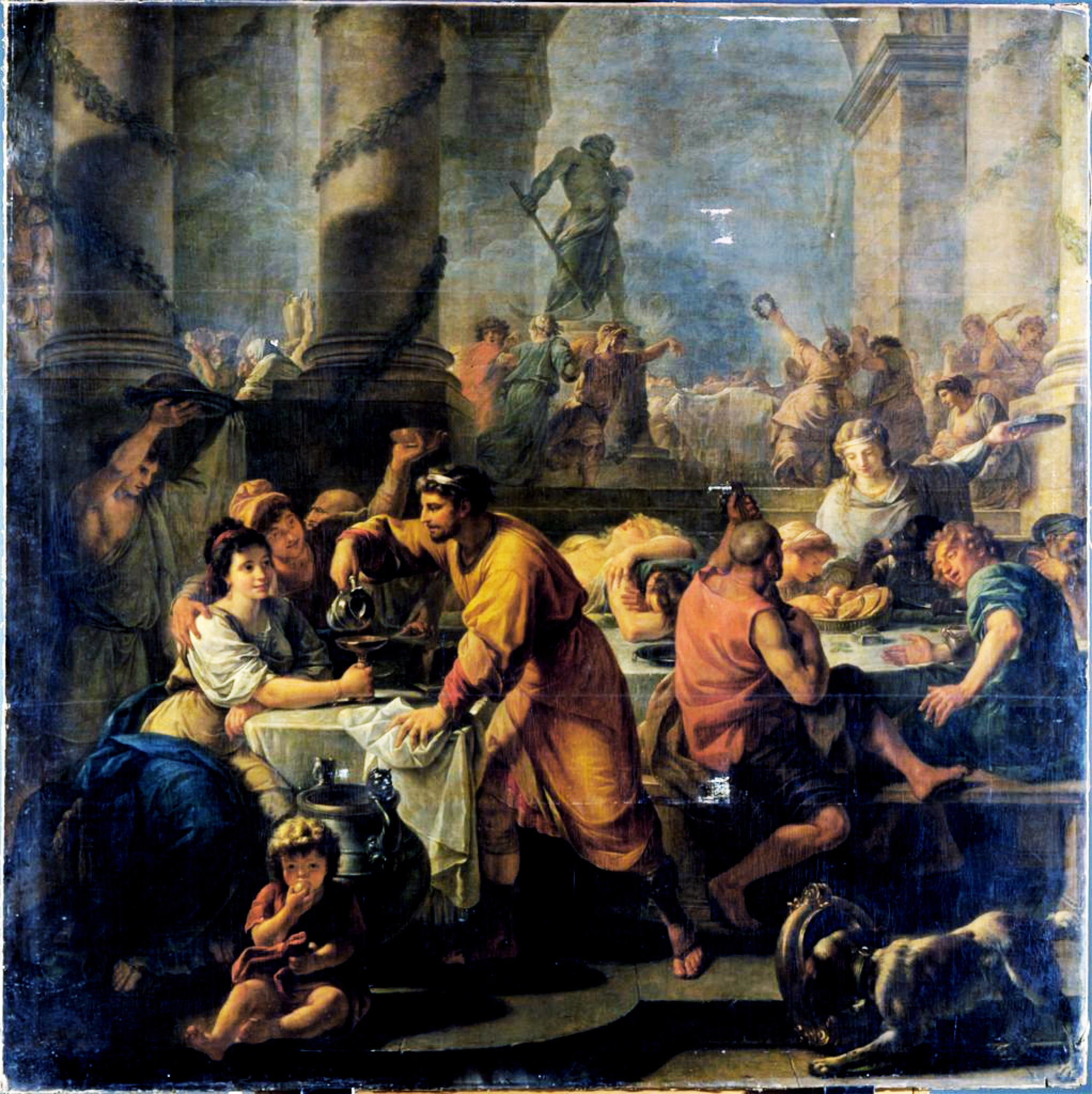
- Saturnalia (1783) by Antoine Callet, showing his interpretation of ancient pagan holiday.

Tractate of the Talmud
- Seder: Nezikin
- Number of mishnahs: 40
- Chapters: 5
- Babylonian Talmud pages: 76
- Jerusalem Talmud pages: 37
- Tosefta chapters: 9

Avodah Zarah (Hebrew: עֲבוֹדָה זָרָה, romanized: ʿăḇôḏāh zārāh, lit. 'foreign worship (idolatry)', [ʔavoˈda zaˈʁa; ʕavoˈda zaˈra]) is the name of a tractate of the Talmud, located in Nezikin, the fourth Order of the Talmud dealing with damages. The main topic of the tractate is laws pertaining to Jews living amongst Gentiles, including regulations about the interaction between Jews and "avodei ha kochavim", which literally interpreted is "worshipers of the stars", but is most often translated as "idolaters", "pagans", or "heathen."

== Mishnah ==
Tractate Avodah Zarah consists of five chapters in the Mishnah. The numbering of the tractate's mishnayot (מִשְׁנָיוֹת) follows the standard numbering. However, different versions split up the individual mishnayot, or combine them, and the chapter breaks may also vary.

Chapter One (nine mishnayot) deals with the prohibition of trade with idolaters around their festivals, such as Saturnalia and Kalenda, so as not to be complicit in the festive idolatry. It also deals with items that are forbidden to be sold to idolaters—basically any item that the idolater is likely to offer in an idolatrous service or commit an immoral act with. Jews who help gentiles worship idols facilitate sin. Thus, the primary biblical commandment explored in the chapter is lifnei iver, referring to the Leviticus 19:14 (RJPS):

You shall not insult the deaf or put a stumbling block before the blind. You shall fear your God: I am the eternal.

Chapter Two (seven mishnayot) deals with precautions against the violence and immorality of idolaters, and the items that are forbidden/permitted to be bought from idolaters. These include categories of objects that may be by-products of idolatrous services, as well as foods with a difficulty in identifying their Kashrut status, such as cheese produced by gentiles in skin-bottles of animals that had been improperly butchered, or else curdled with rennet from a carcass; or fish stock produced by gentiles and which may contain unclean fish. This chapter also deals with the prohibition against a Jew helping to deliver or nurse a gentile child, so as not to bring an idol-worshiper into the world. This prohibition can be eased in cases where refusal would cause enmity towards Jews, unless an excuse to refuse can be made.

Chapter Three (ten mishnayot) deals with the laws of various images/idols and the asherah (idolatrous tree). Thus, it details the distinctions between forbidden and permitted use of multiple aspects and states of idolatrous items.

Chapter Four (twelve mishnayot) addresses benefits from items related to a markulis (Mercury), the nullification of idols (by defacing them), and the prohibition of using gentile-made wine suspected of involvement in idol worship (yayin nesekh).

Chapter Five (twelve mishnayot) continues detailing the prohibitions on yayin nesekh (idolatrous libations). This forms the basis for rabbinic decisions governing the production and consumption of Kosher wine. It includes instructions on the kashering of utensils used by idolaters.

== Tosefta ==
An edition of the Tosefta on Avodah Zarah was published in 1970 that edited by M. S. Zuckermandel. It relied on the Erfurt and Vienna Codices.

== Jerusalem Talmud ==
An edition of the Jerusalem Talmud on Avodah Zarah was published in 1969 based on the first edition of the work published in Venice in 1523. Another edition of the Jerusalem Talmud was edited by Schäfer, Peter, and Hans-Jürgen Becker in 1995. This was followed by an edition by Sussman in 2001.

== Talmud Bavli ==
This Gemara's debates over tractate Avodah Zarah were a frequent target of controversy and criticism. Of all the texts in Rabbinic Judaism, this is probably the one in which it is most difficult to obtain an "authentic" version, as almost all the pages have had censorship imposed. In the standard Vilna edition of the Talmud, the tractate has 76 folios. Regarding the actual length of the Gemara, Avodah Zarah is relatively close to the middle, being an "average" length tractate.

A brief list of major topics in each chapter follows. Since the chief aim in the Gemara is to explain and comment on the Mishnah, this is implied, and the topics mentioned will not be directly about the Mishnah (as a commentary is challenging to summarize in a few lines). Folio references in parentheses are approximate and without a 'side' (i.e., a or b).

Chapter One (folios 2–22) The tractate jumps almost straight into a long series of aggadah. It abounds in aggadic material such as the plight of the nations in the World to Come (2), the Noahide Covenant and God's laughter (3), God's anger and punishment methodologies for both the Jews and gentiles (4), the sin of the Golden Calf and its relation to immortality (5), an exposition of Jewish history relative to the destruction of the Second Temple (8–9), the nature of heresy and the stories of the martyrdom of some eminent rabbis in the Roman persecution (16–18), and a detailed exposition of Psalm 1 (19). Halakhic material related to the immediate subject matter of the tractate includes the laws of attending an idolater's wedding (8), performing an act that looks like idolatry (12), benefiting idolatry (13), and selling weapons to idolaters (15). Halakhic material less related to the primary subject matter includes praying for oneself (7), dating documents (10), what can be burnt at a Jewish king's funeral (11), causing a blemish on an animal before and after the Temple's destruction (13), and selling materials to someone suspected of flouting the Sabbatical year laws (15).

Chapter Two (folios 22–40) This chapter is similar to the last in being long and containing diverse material. Halakhic material related to the tractate includes the laws of buying an animal from an idolater for a sacrifice (23–24), circumcisions performed by idolaters (27), the status of gentile beer (31), the dung of an ox intended for idolatry (34), and the prohibition of intercourse with gentiles (36). Halakhic material less related to the tractate includes the laws of a Jewish apostate (26-27), a unique section outlining in detail many medicinal remedies from the Talmudic era (28–29), the safety/contamination issues in leaving water/wine uncovered (30), the process of overruling a previous rabbinical court (37), and the finer details of recognising kosher fish (39–40). There is some aggadic material describing the return of the Ark of the Covenant after its capture by the Philistines (24) and the sun standing still for Joshua (25).

Chapter Three (folios 40–49) This chapter mainly deals with just the Mishnah and other laws relating to idolatry, including the status of an idol shattered by accident (41) and the consequences of worshipping various objects (46–47). There is a small aggadic paragraph on the crown King David wore (44).

Chapter Four (folios 49–61) This chapter is halakhic, dealing mainly with the Mishnah. Other laws regarding idolatry are discussed, including sacrificing to an idol (51), food and vessels associated with idolatry (52), the exchange for an idol (54), and the status of a gentile child in rendering idolatrous wine (57). Extraneous halakhic material includes the activities allowed and forbidden in the Sabbatical year and cases of rabbis making rulings for specific communities following their own opinions (59).

Chapter Five (folios 62–76) This chapter is halakhic, dealing with the Mishnah and many related topics of gentile wine. Some of these are small, and many of the folios are made up of many logical units that are difficult to summarize. A selection of halakhic material to do with idolatry and idolatrous wine includes the forcible opening of wine by idolaters (70) and the stream created when pouring wine (72). Other halakhic material consists of the laws of a harlot's wage (62–63), the definition of a ger toshav (64), acquisition of property by a gentile (71–72), and settling a price in negotiations (72). In one aggadic paragraph, a rabbi explains the merits of the World to Come to a gentile friend.

== Relationship with Christianity ==
According to Rabbi Avrohom Yeshaya Karelitz, the tractate does include Christianity as a form of idolatry:

Even medieval Jews understood very well that Christianity is avodah zarah of a special type. The tosafists assert that although a Christian pronouncing the name of Jesus in an oath would be taking the name of "another god," it is nonetheless the case that when Christians say the word "God," they have in mind the Creator of heaven and earth. Some later authorities took the continuation of that Tosafot to mean that this special type of avodah zarah is forbidden to Jews but permissible to gentiles, so that a non-Jew who engages in Christian worship commits no sin.

An Aggadic legend from tractate Avodah Zarah 8a contains contemporary observations regarding the Roman mid-winter holidays Saturnalia and Calenda and, a talmudic hypothesis about the pre-historic origin of the winter solstice festival, that would later become the day of Sol Invictus and Christmas.

In the Middle Ages, the entire tractate was expunged from many European editions by Christian censors, and it was considerably difficult to obtain a copy.

== See also ==
- Shirk, similar concept in Islam
- Drink offering
- Thou shalt not make unto thee any graven image
