= Yehoshua Hutner =

20th century rabbi and first director of the Encyclopedia Talmudit project

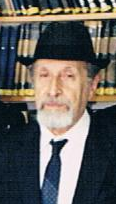
Yehoshua Hutner

Yehoshua Hutner (1911–2009) was the director of the Talmudic Encyclopedia project, Encyclopedia Talmudit for 50 years. He was also involved in Yad HaRav Herzog studying manuscripts of the Mishnah and Gemara through HaTalmud HaYisraeli HaShalem Institute.

== Early life and education ==
Hutner was born in Warsaw to a well-known European rabbinical family. His father, Yehudah Leib Hutner was a respected rabbinical judge (dayan) in Warsaw, and his grandfather, Yosef Zundel Hutner was the author of several books on the Talmud and Shulchan Aruch. His grandfather on his mother's side was Yehudah Halevi Segal, also a rabbi in Warsaw. He was a cousin of the head of Yeshiva Rebbeinu Chaim Berlin, Yitzchak Hutner, and his brother-in-law was Rabbi Tzvi Yehuda Kook.

Hutner studied in Radin as a student of the Chofetz Chaim, (Rabbi Israel Meir Kagan) and Rabbi Shimon Shkop. In the 1930s he moved to Jerusalem.

== Encyclopedia Talmudit ==
Hutner co-founded the project of the Encyclopedia Talmudit with Shlomo Yosef Zevin in 1940. He worked on the monumental project for 50 years, publishing the first volume in 1947. The project published an additional volume every 2–3 years with the 27th volume released in 2007, and the 28th volume coming out in December 2008. The 41st volume was published in 2018, and the project is projected to be completed by 2024.

== Personal life ==
Hutner daughter is Dr. Avigayil Yinon, a psychologist at Bar Ilan University.

== Death ==
Hutner died on April 20, 2009, at the age of 98, in Jerusalem.
