= Gentile =

Term referring to a non-Jew

Gentile (/ˈdʒɛntaɪl/) is a word that today usually means someone who is not Jewish. Other groups that also claim Israelite heritage, notably Mormons, have historically used the term gentile to describe outsiders. The term is also historically used as a synonym for pagan by Christian writers. As a term used to describe non-members of a religious/ethnic group, gentile is sometimes compared to other words used to describe the "outgroup" in other cultures (see List of terms for ethnic out-groups).

In some translations of the Quran, gentile is used to translate an Arabic word that refers to non-Jews and/or people not versed in or not able to read scripture.

The English word gentile derives from the Latin word gentilis, meaning "of or belonging to the same people or nation" (from Latin gēns 'clan, tribe, people, family'). Archaic and specialist uses of the word gentile in English (particularly in linguistics) still carry this meaning of "relating to a people or nation." The development of the word to principally mean "non-Jew" in English is entwined with the history of Bible translations from Hebrew and Greek into Latin and English. Its meaning has also been shaped by Rabbinical Jewish thought and Christian theology.

== Etymology ==
"Gentile" derives from Latin gentilis, which itself derives from the Latin gens, meaning clan or tribe. Gens derives from the Proto-Indo-European *ǵénh₁tis, meaning birth or production. The original meaning of "clan" or "family" was extended in post-Augustan Latin to acquire the wider meaning of belonging to a distinct nation or ethnicity. Later still, the word came to refer to other nations, 'not a Roman citizen'.

In Saint Jerome's Latin version of the Bible, the Vulgate, gentilis was used along with gentes, to translate Greek and Hebrew words with similar meanings when the text referred to the non-Israelite peoples. The most important of such Hebrew words was goy (גוי, plural, goyim), a term with the broad meaning of "people" or "nation" which was sometimes used to refer to Israelites, but with the plural form goyim tending to be used in the Bible to refer to non-Israelite nations. Other words translated in some contexts to mean "gentile/s" in the modern sense were the Biblical Hebrew word nokhri (נכרי – often otherwise translated as 'stranger') and for the New Testament Greek word éthnos (ἔθνος). The first English translators followed this approach, using the word "gentile" to refer to the non-Israelite nations (and principally using the word "nation(s)" to translate goy/goyim in other contexts). See the "Christianity" section.

These developments in Bible translation practice were related to developments in Jewish Rabbinical and Christian thinking which – in the centuries after the Old and New Testament were written – created an increasingly clear binary opposition between "Jew" and "non-Jew". The Hebrew word "goy" went through a change in meaning which parallels the journey of "gentilis/gentile" – both words moving from meaning "nation" to "non-Jew" today. The word "Goy" is now also used in English, principally by Jewish people – see goy.

== Judaism ==
=== The Hebrew Bible ===
In 2006, the academic David Novak wrote, with limited exceptions, "The Bible can be seen as one long discussion of what differentiates Israel from all the other peoples of the world."

The Hebrew Bible does not have a word which directly corresponds to the modern concept of a gentile (see etymology above). Instead, the Bible views different groups of gentiles in different ways. Novak states that, "The biblical categories of Gentiles, beginning with those farthest removed from a relationship with Israel and moving up to those closest to a relationship with Israel, seem to be: (1) the Amalekites; (2) the seven Canaanite nations; (3) the nations of the world; (4) the Samaritans; (5) slaves; (6) resident aliens; (7) proselytes."

The Hebrew Bible does not show much concern for non-Israelites except insofar as they interact with the people of Israel. Nonetheless, because the God of Israel is a universal God, there must be some relationship between gentiles and God. Accordingly, Novak observes, gentiles as well as Israelites are enjoined in the book of Psalms to "ascribe to the Lord glory and strength" (Psalms 96:7).

Christine E. Hayes states that gentiles in the Hebrew Bible were generally gerim (resident aliens). They were not necessarily converts, whether in the modern or rabbinic sense, but were still given many rights and privileges. They were also allowed to keep their distinct ethnic identities. But after Ezra-Nehemiah, many Israelites believed there was an impermeable ritual and genealogical boundary between themselves and gentiles. However, other scholars argue that the boundary is rooted in religious factors.

Saul Oylan argues that gentiles automatically became Israelite when they lived in one of their tribal territories, which was believed to reflect 'early practices' (Ezekiel 47:21–23).

Troy W. Martin believes Jewishness is defined by adherence to covenantal circumcision, regardless of ancestry (Genesis 17:9–14). Thus, even an uncircumcised Jew could be a gentile despite his biological descent from Abraham. He believes this view was extended to the New Testament, where membership in God's chosen people was based on religious adherence rather than ancestry (Galatians 3:28).

=== Tannaim ===
Tannaim were the rabbinic sages whose views are recorded in the Mishnah, from approximately 10–220 CE.

It was this rabbinic literature of the first centuries CE that developed the concept of the gentile as we understand it today - as "any individual who is not a Jew, erasing all ethnic and social differences among different others".

"Mishnah-Tosefta makes no clear distinction among the various types of non-Israelites. Romans, Greeks, Syrians, Egyptians, and the like are classified merely as gentiles, goyim or nokrim" "The rabbis... had one term for all non-Israelites, whether idolaters or farmers, liars or trustworthy, Greek or Roman."

— Gary G. Porton, 2020

However, the attitudes of the Rabbis to gentiles were not simple or uniform. Porton argues that the Mishnah-Tosefta discusses gentiles for two quite different reasons: firstly, practically, to guide the relations between Israelites and gentiles who were living alongside each other in Palestine. Secondly, at a theoretical level, gentiles are discussed because, in order to define the people of Israel and its symbols and institutions, it was necessary to define who lay outside that group.

Some Tannaim show a positive attitude towards the gentiles. Joshua ben Hananiah believed that there are righteous men amongst the gentiles who will enter the world to come. He believed that except for the descendants of the Amaleks, the rest of the gentiles will adopt monotheism and the righteous among them will escape Gehenna.

Other rabbinical writings show more hostility towards gentiles which needs to be understood in the context of frequent persecution of the Jews in this period. The most famous and extreme of the anti-gentile teachers is Simeon bar Yochai. He is often quoted by antisemites in his sayings: "The best among the Gentiles deserves to be killed", "The most pious woman is addicted to sorcery" and "The best of snakes ought to have its head crushed". Such extreme views can be explained by the sage's life experience: he witnessed his teacher being tortured to death, and became a fugitive after speaking out against Roman oppression. Later commentators have limited this teaching to idolators and only at times of war.

Eliezer ben Hurcanus writes that the mind of every gentile is always intent upon idolatry. He believed that gentiles only perform animal sacrifice to make a name for themselves. He further believed that gentiles have no share in the world to come.

Eleazar of Modi'im wrote that Jews, when guilty of the same sin as gentiles, will not enter hell whereas the gentiles will. Eleazar ben Azariah believed that the rulings performed by a gentile court are not valid for Jews. Rabbi Akiva believed that Israel's monotheism is far superior to the ever-changing beliefs of the gentiles. Jose the Galilean criticizes Israel for inconsistency compared to the faithfulness of the gentiles to their ancestral beliefs. He believed the good deeds of the gentiles will be rewarded as well.

=== Later sages ===
Rav Ashi believed that a Jew who sells a gentile property adjacent to a Jewish property should be excommunicated. The violation of Jewish women by gentile men was so frequent that the rabbis declared that a woman raped by a gentile should not be divorced from her husband, as Torah says: "The Torah outlawed the issue of a gentile as that of a beast." A gentile midwife was not to be employed for fear of the poisoning of the baby. The gentiles should be dealt with caution in cases of using them as witness in a criminal or civil suit. The gentile does not honor his promises like that of a Jew. The laws of the Torah were not to be revealed to the gentiles, for the knowledge of these laws might give gentiles an advantage in dealing with Jews. Shimon ben Lakish wrote that "A gentile who observes Sabbath deserves death".

=== In modern times ===
Under rabbinic law, a modern-day gentile is only required to observe the Seven Laws of Noah, but Jews are required to observe Mosaic law. During periods of decreased animosity between Jews and gentiles, some of the rabbinic laws against fellowship and fraternization were relaxed; for example, Maimonides was the personal physician of Saladin. Even though most contemporary rabbinic schools are not as hostile to Gentiles as Medieval rabbinic schools were, some Orthodox rabbinic schools hold extremely xenophobic views. For example, scholars from the Zionist HaRav Kook yeshiva are schooled in the doctrine that Jews and gentiles have different kinds of souls. One of the yeshiva's scholars, David Bar-Hayim, published a paper in 1989 in which he explained the doctrine, entitled "Yisrael Nikraim Adam" (Israel is called 'Man'). In his conclusion, Bar-Hayim writes:

There is no escaping the facts: the Torah of Israel makes a clear distinction between a Jew, who is defined as "Man," and a Gentile. This distinction is expressed in a long list of Halachic laws, be they monetary laws, the laws of the Temple, capital laws or others. Even one who is not an erudite Torah scholar is obligated to recognize this simple fact; it cannot be erased or obscured ... One who carefully studies the sources cited previously will realize the abysmal difference between the concepts "Jew" and "Gentile" -- and consequently, he will understand why Halacha differentiates between them.

Bar-Chayim further quotes Abraham Isaac Kook (1865–1935), founder of the yeshiva and the first Ashkenazi chief rabbi of British Mandatory Palestine:

The difference between the Jewish soul, in all its independence, inner desires, longings, character and standing, and the soul of all the Gentiles, on all of their levels, is greater and deeper than the difference between the soul of a man and the soul of an animal, for the difference in the latter case is one of quantity, while the difference in the first case is one of essential quality.

Similar anti-gentile remarks have been expressed by the late chief Sephardi Rabbi Ovadia Yosef, in which he stated in a sermon in 2010 that "The sole purpose of Gentiles is to serve Jews". He said that gentiles served a divine purpose: "Why are Gentiles needed? They will work, they will plow, they will reap. We will sit like an effendi and eat. That is why Gentiles were created. These remarks by Yosef were sharply criticized by many Jewish organizations such as the Anti-Defamation League (ADL) and American Jewish Committee.

Those who hold these views do not necessarily support any sort of harm to non-Jews. Rav Ovadia Yosef, himself, condemned those who vandalized Arab property, as did the vast majority of Orthodox leaders.

Many Orthodox schools have expressed more humanistic views. Rav Aharon Lichtenstein, Rosh Yeshivah of Gush, for example, strongly opposed what he saw as racist attitudes among certain segments of Religious Zionism.

Jewish philosopher and professor Menachem Kellner criticizes the assumption of some Orthodox Jews that there is an "ontological divide between Jews and Gentiles", which he believes is contrary to what the Torah teaches.

=== In Kabbalah ===
Some Kabbalistic writings suggest a distinction between the souls of the gentiles and the souls of the Jews. These writings describe three levels, elements, or qualities of soul:

- Nefesh (נפש): the lower part, or "animal part", of the soul. It is linked to instincts and bodily cravings. This part of the soul is provided at birth.
- Ruach (רוח): the middle soul, the "spirit". It contains the moral virtues and the ability to distinguish between good and evil.
- Neshamah (נשמה): the higher soul, or "super-soul". This separates man from all other life-forms. It is related to the intellect and allows man to enjoy and benefit from the afterlife. It allows one to have some awareness of the existence and presence of God.

Other descriptions of the soul add two more levels Chaya and Yechida.

There has been debate among the kabbalists on whether gentiles access the mystical knowledge (Daat). Isaac Luria, prominent kabbalist, wrote:

Israel possesses the three levels of soul, nefesh, ruah, neshamah,—from holiness... the gentiles possess only the level of nefesh from the feminine side of the shells... for the souls of the nations (gentiles), come from the Qlippoth, are called evil and not good' since they are created without knowledge (Daat). The animal soul of man is the good and evil inclination. The soul of the gentiles comes from the three shells: wind, cloud and fire, all of them evil.

Moses de León, presumed author of the main kabbalistic work Sefer Ha-Zohar, agrees with this assumption:

You know that all of the gentiles (goyim) and all of their matters are in the category of the impure... you must know and discern that the gentiles come from the side of impurity, for the souls of the gentiles derive from the side of impurity

The following passage in the Zohar reaffirms this idea:

Said Rabbi Hiyya: If this is true (that neshamah is acquired through following the Torah) is it so that gentiles have no neshamah, only the living nefesh? Rabbi Yohannan said: That is correct.

The view that gentiles only possess bestial souls was more popularized by the main kabbalistic text of hasidic movement, the Tanya (or Likkutei Amarim). Rabbi Shneur Zalman of Liadi, the founder of the Chabad hasidic dynasty, claims that Jews like gentiles possess a vital animal soul, but the animal soul of the Jew comes from the fourth husk (Qlippoth nogah), while the animal soul of the gentiles comes from the three lower impure husks (Qlippoth Tumaot). Thus nothing gentiles do can elevate them to the level of holiness, their soul remains trapped in the unholy world of the impure Qlippoth.

However, other Kabbalists like Abraham Abulafia believed that higher levels of soul are to some extent accessible to gentiles.

== Christianity ==
The Greek ethnos, where it is translated as "gentile" in the context of early Christianity, implies non-Israelite. According to Dale Allison, while the ministry of the Historical Jesus was largely aimed at the rural people of Israel, he was not hostile to gentiles; early missionary efforts towards them would be unexpected had Jesus entirely rejected them. Allison notes that Jesus's command in Matthew 10:6 to not preach to gentiles or Samaritans is due to the immediate needs of Israel, not prejudice; the author of Matthew was faithful to both the historical Jesus and the teachings of Paul regarding the election of Israel. In the years after the ministry of Jesus, there were questions over the inclusion of non-Jews and the applicability of the Law of Moses, including circumcision. Over a few centuries, this led to a split between Jewish Christians, who followed Jesus but also Mosaic Law, and Pauline Christianity (also known as Gentile Christianity) which abandoned Mosaic Law and eventually became the official religion of the Roman Empire. Jewish Christian beliefs died out around the fifth century, after being rejected by both orthodox Judaism and orthodox Christianity.

With the ministry of Paul the Apostle the gospel began to be spread among the non-Jewish subjects of the Roman empire. A question existed among the disciples whether receiving the Holy Spirit through proselytization would be restricted to Israelites or whether it would include the gentiles as in Acts 10:34–47:

And they of the circumcision which believed were astonished, as many as came with Peter, because that on the Gentiles also was poured out the gift of the Holy Ghost. For they heard them speak with tongues, and magnify God. Then answered Peter, Can any man forbid water, that these should not be baptized, which have received the Holy Ghost as well as we?

Within a few centuries, some Christians used the word "gentiles" to mean non-Christians. The alternative pagani was felt to be less elegant.

Some scholars argue that the "gentiles" that Paul and James preached to were actually northern Israelite tribes who had long lost their identity since the Assyrian exile.

=== Fathers of the Church ===
Saint Gregory noted that those who had been redeemed included "some from among the Jews and many among the gentiles".

=== Terminology in Christian Bibles ===
In the King James Version, "gentile" is only one of several words used to translate goy or goyim. It is translated as "nation" 374 times, "heathen" 143 times, "gentiles" 30 times, and "people" 11 times. Some of these verses, such as Genesis 12:2 ("I will make of thee a great nation") and Genesis 25:23 ("Two nations are in thy womb") refer to Israelites or descendants of Abraham. Other verses, such as Isaiah 2:4 and Deuteronomy 11:23 are generic references to any nation. Typically, the KJV restricts the translation to "gentile" when the text is specifically referring to non-Jewish people. For example, the only use of the word in Genesis is in chapter 10, verse 5, referring to the peopling of the world by descendants of Japheth, "By these were the isles of the Gentiles divided in their lands; every one after his tongue, after their families, in their nations."

In the New Testament, the Greek word ethnos is used for peoples or nations in general, and is typically translated by the word "people", as in John 11:50. ("Nor consider that it is expedient for us, that one man should die for the people, and that the whole nation perish not.") The translation "gentiles" is used in some instances, as in Matthew 10:5–6 to indicate non-Israelite peoples:

These twelve Jesus sent forth, and commanded them, saying, Go not into the way of the Gentiles, and into any city of the Samaritans enter ye not: But go rather to the lost sheep of the house of Israel.

Altogether, the word is used 123 times in the King James Version of the Bible, and 168 times in the New Revised Standard Version.

== The Church of Jesus Christ of Latter-day Saints ==
In the terminology of the Church of Jesus Christ of Latter-day Saints (LDS Church), the word "gentile" can be used to refer to people who are not members of the LDS Church, since members regard themselves as regathered Israelites. The LDS Church's website states this about the meaning of gentile in Scripture (including the Book of Mormon), "As used in the scriptures, gentiles has several meanings. Sometimes it designates people of non-Israelite lineage, sometimes people of non-Jewish lineage, and sometimes nations that are without the gospel, even though there may be some Israelite blood among the people. This latter usage is especially characteristic of the word as used in the Book of Mormon and Doctrine and Covenants."

Thus, in such usage, Jewish people may be gentiles because they are not members of the LDS Church.

Beyond this Scriptural usage, gentile was widely used by Mormons in day-to-day life in the nineteenth century, with such usage declining through the twentieth century. As with the binary Jew/gentile distinction, the Mormon/gentile distinction arose as Mormons were socially excluded and ostracised: according to John L. Needham of Utah State University:

"Nineteenth century Mormons in the American West applied 'gentile', as an adjective as much as a slur, to nearly everyone and everything that did not adhere to their faith or desert kingdom. Their xenophobia stood to reason: they were victims of religious discrimination, from ridicule in the press to acts of mob violence. They had been driven from a half dozen eastern states and were denied asylum in all others. Gentile thus served as a call to circle the wagons socially and politically around the fold - a means of naming the other".

— letter, PMLA Journal (1999)

Needham goes on to say that today Mormons have "outgrown the term".

== Islam ==
Some translations of the Quran, such as the famous Pickthall translation, employed the word "gentile" in some instances of the translation of the Arabic word الْأُمِّيِّينَ (al-ʼummiyyīn), the definite non-nominative masculine plural of أُمِّيّ (ʼummiyy), as in, for example, the following verse:

Among the People of the Scripture there is he who, if thou trust him with a weight of treasure, will return it to thee. And among them there is he who, if thou trust him with a piece of gold, will not return it to thee unless thou keep standing over him. That is because they say: We have no duty to the Gentiles. They speak a lie concerning Allah knowingly. - Quran 3:75

The word ummi occurs six times in the Quran. Pickthall only uses the word gentile once in the above passage and translates other occurrences as illiterate. However many other western scholars of the Quran came to similar conclusion that the word ummi is equal to the Hebrew word Goyim. Edward Henry Palmer used the word gentile in his translation of the Quran several times including in the following verse:

He is who sent unto the Gentiles a prophet amongst themselves to recite to them his signs and to purify them the book and wisdom although they were before in obvious error. -Quran 62:2

Palmer like Pickthall did not translate all instances of the word ummi as Gentiles, but his comment on chapter 3 verse 19 shows his opinion :

Mohammad seems to have borrowed the expression from the Jews, ummiyyun having the same significance as Hebrew Goyim.

John Medows Rodwell in his translation of the Quran comments similarly in a note on chapter 52 verse 157 that the word ummi is equivalent to the Greek ethnos and the Hebrew goyim, and was applied by Jews to those who did not know scripture. Elwood Morris Wherry wrote that almost certainly

this appellation came originally from the Jews who used it in expressing their contempt for the Gentile prophet.

Some Muslim scholars also agreed with this idea: a French translation of the Quran by Muhammad Hamidullah uses the expression 'gentile prophet' in Sura 7 verse 157–158. Muhammad Shahrur also believed that ummi prophet means gentile prophet in his book Al-Kitab wa-L-Quran (The Book and the Quran). Abul A'la Maududi similarly translated the following instance as gentile.

He it is who has sent to the gentiles a Messenger from among themselves, one who rehearses to them his verses, purifies their lives, and imparts to them the book and the wisdom although before that they were in utter error. -Quran 62:2

Maududi clarifies in notes on this verse that the reason this verse has been sent is because Jews looked down on Arabs as gentiles and did not believe that a prophet can rise from their kind.

However vast majority of Islamic scholars and translations made by Muslims are of the idea that ummi means illiterate.

== See also ==
- Am ha'aretz
- Gaijin – a Japanese word similar in concept
- Gentleman
- Ger toshav
- Kafir
- Jewish adjacent
- Mawali
- Noahidism
- Shabbos goy
- Who is a Jew?
