= Clémence Boulouque =

French professor, journalist, and literary critic (born 1977)

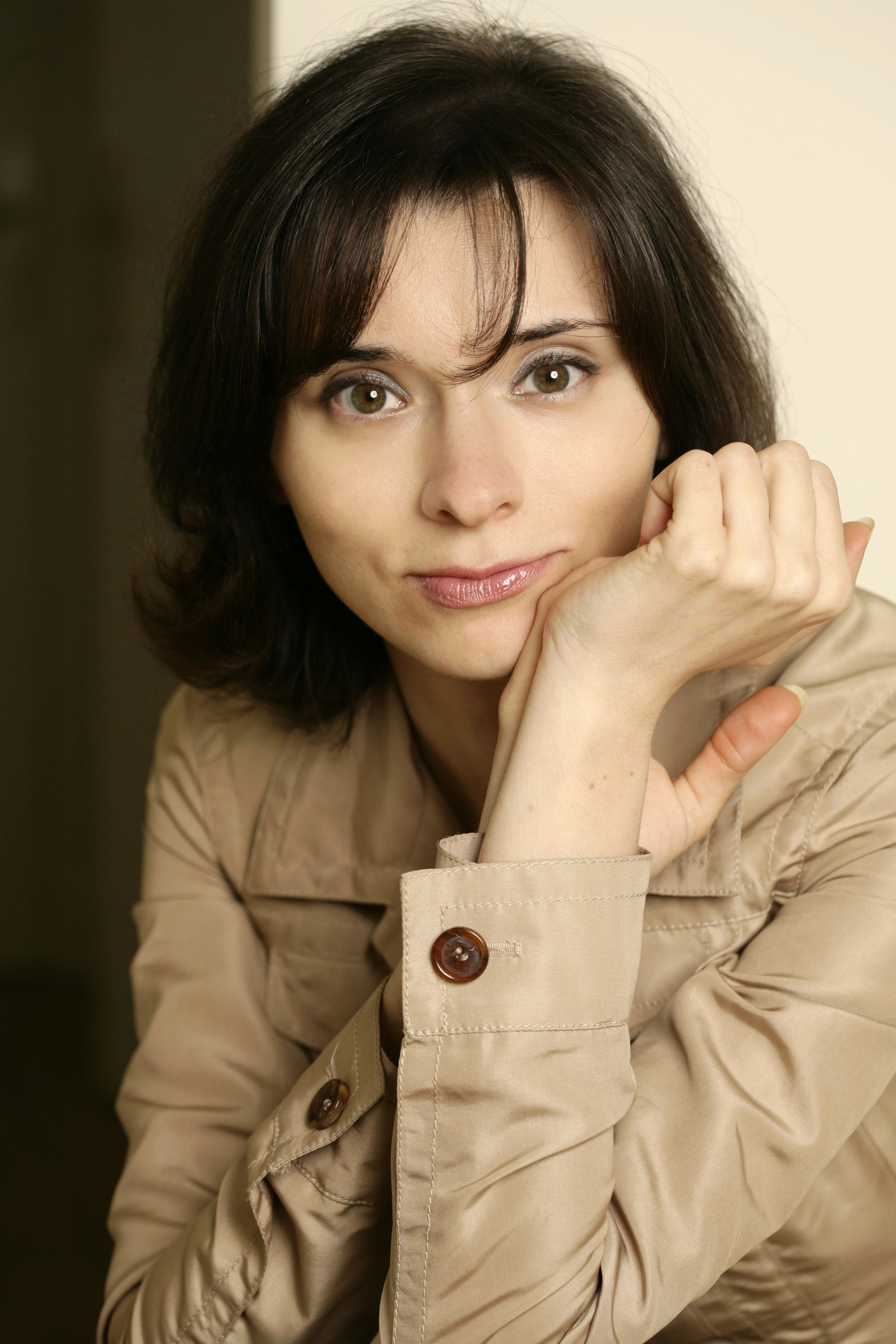
- Born: 25 June 1977 (age 49); Paris, France
- Education: Paris Institute of Political Studies; ESSEC Business School; School of International and Public Affairs, Columbia University; New York University; Katz Center for Advanced Judaic Studies, University of Pennsylvania
- Occupations: Political scientist, novelist, and professor
- Writing career
- Notable awards: Fulbright scholarship Prix Fénéon (2003)

Clémence Boulouque (born 25 June 1977) is a French scholar of political science and international relations specializing in Jewish and Israel studies. She is a professor, journalist, novelist, and literary critic. Currently, she serves as the Carl and Bernice Witten Associate Professor of Jewish and Israel Studies in the Department of Religion at Columbia University in the City of New York.

== Early life and education ==
The daughter of French magistrate Gilles Boulouque, her life was upended when her father was appointed an anti-terrorism judge in the aftermath of the wave of terrorist attacks that took place in France in 1986, implicating Islamic terrorist organizations linked to Iran and other Muslim-majority countries (see also: 1985–86 Paris attacks). Clémence Boulouque was only thirteen when her father, confronted with terrible political-media pressure, committed suicide on 13 December 1990. It is from this painful experience, revived by her presence in New York City on 11 September 2001, that Boulouque's vocation for literature and novel was born. A graduate from the Paris Institute of Political Studies and the ESSEC Business School, Boulouque spent some time in a recruiting firm before moving to New York City for the first time, where she won a Fulbright scholarship and studied for a master's degree in international relations at the School of International and Public Affairs of Columbia University in the City of New York (2001–2002).

== Career ==
After returning to France, Boulouque devoted herself to writing, journalism, and literary criticism from 2002 to 2007. In 2003, she wrote her first novel, Mort d'un silence, in which she tells the long ordeal that she and her family lived when her father committed suicide. The book was awarded with the Prix Fénéon in the same year. She wrote in particular for the French magazines Le Figaro littéraire, Transfuge, and Lire. She regularly intervened as a chronicler in the program Tout arrive by Arnaud Laporte on France Culture. She was the producer of the series of programs such as À voix nue with Toni Morrison or Amos Oz, as well as a summer series about Marguerite Yourcenar.

In 2005, William Karel directed the film adaptation of her first novel, titled La Fille du juge. This documentary mixed:

- Archive footage of programs and newscasts;
- Photos and family movies shot in Super 8 by judge Boulouque;
- Scenes shot in New York City and featuring the young novelist in person (at 28). The voice-over which "expresses" the words of Clemence, is that of the actress Elsa Zylberstein whom Karel met on the shooting of Van Gogh by Maurice Pialat.

Boulouque returned to the United States in 2008 and was awarded a Ph.D. in Jewish Studies and History from New York University in 2014. Afterwards, Boulouque completed her postdoctoral training at the Katz Center for Advanced Judaic Studies of the University of Pennsylvania, where she joined the New Perspectives on the Origins, Context and Diffusion of the Academic Study of Judaism fellowship (2014–2015). She currently teaches as the Carl and Bernice Witten Associate Professor of Jewish and Israel Studies in the Department of Religion at Columbia University in the City of New York. Her courses of instruction include Religion and the Movies as well as Masterpieces of Western Literature and Philosophy. Boulouque is the series editor of New Studies in Jewish Mysticism for Stanford University Press.

== Main works ==
- 2003: Mort d'un silence, narrative, Éditions Gallimard, ISBN 2070316890
  Crowned by the prix Fénéon; Adaptation in documentary film in 2005 by director William Karel under the title La Fille du juge, which was nominated for the 2007 César Award in the documentaries category
- 2004: Sujets libres, novel
- 2004: Le Goût de Tanger, Mercure de France, ISBN 978-2715224575
- 2005: Chasse à courre, novel, Gallimard, ISBN 2070775097
- 2005: Juives d'Afrique du Nord, with Nicole Serfaty, ISBN 2912019362
- 2005: Au pays des macarons, Mercure de France, ISBN 2715225687
- 2007: Nuit ouverte, novel, Flammarion, ISBN 2-08-120214-X
- 2008: Survivre et vivre : entretiens avec Clémence Boulouque : la fille d'Irène Némirovsky témoigne, Denoël, ISBN 978-2-207-26011-1;
- 2011: L’Amour et des poussières, novel, Gallimard, ISBN 978-2-07-013515-8
- 2013: Je n’emporte rien du monde, Gallimard, ISBN 978-2-07-013901-9
- 2024: Le sentiment des crépuscules, novel, Robert Laffont, ISBN 978-2-22-127720-1
