= Relations between Eastern Orthodoxy and Judaism =

The Eastern Orthodox Church and Roman Catholic Church were united until the East–West Schism in 1054. Since then, the relationship between Eastern Orthodox Christians and Rabbinic Judaism has ranged from friendly, to punctuated tolerance, to outright hostility. During the last years of the Byzantine Empire, many Venetian Jews were able to purchase naturalization, and were therefore entitled to a broader set of rights than Christians. During the period of the Ottoman Empire, many Christians and Jews experienced radically different and varying experiences. In other Orthodox nations such as Russia, many Jews faced much more difficult challenges.

== Patriarchal statement ==
An Orthodox Christian attitude to the Jewish people is seen in an encyclical of 1568 written by Ecumenical Patriarch Metrophanes III (1520–1580) to the Greek Orthodox in Crete (1568) following reports that Jews were being mistreated. The Patriarch stated, "Injustice, therefore, is and stands, regardless to whomever acted upon or performed against, as still injustice. The unjust person is never relieved of the responsibility of these unjust acts under the pretext that the injustice done is done against a heterodox and not to a believer. As our Lord Jesus Christ in the Gospels said, "Do not oppress or accuse anyone falsely; do not make any distinction or give room to the believers to injure those of another belief."

== Views on salvation and pluralism ==
The traditional Jewish view is that non-Jews may receive God's saving grace (see Noahides), and this view is reciprocated in Orthodox Christianity. Writing for the Greek Orthodox Archdiocese of America, Rev. Protopresbyter George C. Papademetriou has written a summary of classical Christian and Eastern Orthodox Christian views on the subject of the salvation of non-Christians, entitled An Orthodox Christian View of Non-Christian Religions.

In 1981, Professor John N. Karmiris, University of Athens, based on his studies of the Church Fathers, concluded that the salvation of non-Christians, non-Orthodox and heretics depends on the all-good, all-wise and all-powerful God, who acts in the Church but also through other "ways". God's saving grace is also channeled outside the Church. It cannot be assumed that salvation is denied non-Christians living in true piety and according to natural law by the God who "is love" (1 John 4:8), In his justice and mercy God will judge them worthy even though they are outside the true Church. This position is shared by many Orthodox who agree that God's salvation extends to all who live according to His "image" and "participate in the Logos". The Holy Spirit acted through the prophets of the Old Testament and in the nations. Salvation is also open outside the Church.

Some compare the Church to Noah's Ark. It is not impossible for someone to "survive the flood" of sin by clinging to whatever driftwood is around or by trying to cobble together a raft from bits and pieces of whatever floats, but the Ark is a far safer choice to make. Likewise, the heterodox and even non-Christians might be saved simply through God's own choice, made for His own reasons, but it is far safer for any individual person to turn to the Orthodox Church. Thus, it behooves Orthodox Christians to exhort others to take this safer path. Likewise, the Orthodox remember that Christ mentions one, and only one thing that unfailingly leads to perdition—blasphemy against the Holy Spirit. No other path is explicitly and universally excluded by Christ's words.

As is common in many other faiths, the question of salvation for those outside of Orthodox Christianity is understandably secondary to what the Church expects of its own adherents. As St. Theophan the Recluse put the matter: "You ask, will the heterodox be saved ... Why do you worry about them? They have a Saviour Who desires the salvation of every human being. He will take care of them. You and I should not be burdened with such a concern. Study yourself and your own sins ... I will tell you one thing, however: should you, being Orthodox and possessing the Truth in its fullness, betray Orthodoxy, and enter a different faith, you will lose your soul forever."

== Fifth Academic Meeting ==
The Fifth Academic Meeting between Judaism And Orthodox Christianity was held in Thessaloniki, Greece, on May 27–29, 2003. The meeting was organized by Metropolitan Emmanuel of France, who heads the Office of International and Intercultural Affairs to the Liaison Office of the Ecumenical Patriarchate to the European Union, Brussels, in cooperation with the International Jewish Committee for Interreligious Consultations, New York, Co-Chaired by Rabbi Israel Singer who is also Chairman of the World Jewish Congress, and Rabbi Joel Meyers who is also the Executive Vice President of the Rabbinical Assembly. In his opening remarks, Ecumenical Patriarch Bartholomew denounced religious fanaticism and rejected attempts by any faith to denigrate others.

=== Principles for relations ===
The following principles were adopted at the meeting:

- Judaism and Christianity, while hearkening to common sources, inviolably maintain their internal individuality and particularity.
- The purpose of our dialogue is to remove prejudice and to promote a spirit of mutual understanding and constructive cooperation in order to confront common problems.
- Specific proposals will be developed to educate the faithful of both religions to promote healthy relationships based on mutual respect and understanding to confront bigotry and fanaticism.
- Being conscious of the crises of ethical and spiritual values in the contemporary world, we will endeavor to identify historical models of peaceful coexistence, which can be applied to minority Jewish and Orthodox communities in the Diaspora.
- We will draw from our spiritual sources to develop programs to promote and enhance our common values such as peace, social justice and human rights, specifically addressing the concerns of religious minorities.

Participants agreed to establish a permanent coordinating committee to maintain and foster continuing relationships. The Committee would jointly monitor principles enunciated at the meeting and would further enhance the dialogue and foster understanding between the respective religious communities.

== See also ==
- Christianity and Judaism
- Christian–Jewish reconciliation
- History of the Jews in the Byzantine Empire
- Interfaith dialogue
- Relations between Roman Catholicism and Judaism
- Holy See-Russia relations
