= Protestantism and Judaism =

Interfaith relations

Relations between Protestantism and Judaism have existed since the time of the Reformation, although there has been more emphasis on dialogue since the 20th century, with Protestant and Jewish scholars in the United States being at the forefront of the emerging interfaith movement.

In 1523, Martin Luther advised kindness toward the Jews because Jesus Christ was born a Jew and Luther aimed to convert them to Christianity. When his efforts at conversion failed, he grew increasingly bitter toward them.

== Church of Scotland ==
In 1981 the Assembly of the Church of Scotland declared "its belief in the continuing place of God's people of Israel within the divine purpose."

== Church of England ==
In 2019, the Church of England Faith and Order Commission published God’s Unfailing Word: Theological and Practical Perspectives on Christian–Jewish Relations, which stated, "As a body responsible for theology, not interfaith relations, the Commission would focus on clarifying the theological positions arising from the Church of England's engagement in Christian-Jewish relations since the watershed of the 1960s". Among issues raised, the document addresses passages in the New Testament that are allegedly problematic for Jewish-Christian relation.

== Lutheran World Federation ==
In 1982 the Lutheran World Federation issued a consultation stating that "we Christians must purge ourselves of any hatred of the Jews and any sort of teaching of contempt for Judaism."

The European Lutheran Commission on the Church and the Jewish People (Lutherische Europäische Kommission Kirche und Judentum, LEKKJ) is an umbrella organization representing twenty-five Lutheran church bodies in Europe. On May 12, 2003, they issued A Response to Dabru Emet:

Against this background, LEKKJ welcomes the issuance of Dabru Emet: A Jewish Statement on Christians and Christianity. We see in this statement a confirmation of our own work of these past years....We know that we must reexamine themes in Lutheran theology that in the past have repeatedly given rise to enmity towards Jews....Fully aware that Dabru Emet is in the first instance an intra-Jewish invitation to conversation, we see in this statement also an aid to us in expressing and living out our faith in such a way that we do not denigrate Jews, but rather respect them in their otherness, and are enabled to give an account of our own identity more clearly as we scrutinize it in the light of how others see us.

== Baptist church ==
In March 1995 the Alliance of Baptists issued "A Baptist Statement on Jewish-Christian Relations"; a revision of this statement was released on April 25, 2003. In part, is says:

As Baptist Christians we are the inheritors of and, in our turn, have been the transmitters of a theology which lays the blame for the death of Jesus at the feet of the Jews; a theology which has taken the anti-Jewish polemic of the Christian Scriptures out of its first century context and has usurped for the Church the biblical promises and prerogatives given by God to the Jews...The madness, the hatred, the dehumanizing attitudes which led to the events known collectively as the Holocaust did not occur overnight or within the span of a few years, but were the culmination of centuries of such Christian theology, teaching and church-sanctioned action directed against the Jews simply because they were Jews.

This document lists recommended actions that they asked all Christians to join them in:

- Affirming the teaching of the Christian Scriptures that God has not rejected the community of Israel, God's covenant people (Romans 11:1–2), since 'the gifts and calling of God are irrevocable' (Romans 11:29);
- Renouncing interpretations of Scripture which foster religious stereotyping and prejudice against the Jewish people and their faith;
- Seeking genuine dialogue with the broader Jewish community, a dialogue built on mutual respect and the integrity of each other's faith;
- Lifting our voices quickly and boldly against all expressions of anti-Semitism;
- Educating ourselves and others on the history of Jewish-Christian relations from the first century to the present, so as to understand our present by learning from our past.
- Commit ourselves to rigorous consideration of appropriate forms of Christian witness for our time.

== United Church of Canada ==
The United Church of Canada issued a statement in May 1998 entitled "Bearing Faithful Witness: United Church-Jewish Relations Today." This calls upon Christians to:

- Stop trying to convert Jews to Christianity; Reject Biblical interpretations which negatively stereotype Jews, as this leads to anti-Semitism; Reject the idea that Christianity is superior to, or a replacement for, Judaism; recognize that anti-Semitism is an element of historic Christianity, but not an inherent part of it - therefore one can remove it from Christianity and still remain faithful to Christianity.

Bearing Faithful Witness, has continued within the Church as a study program; on August 13, 2003, the 38th General Council of The United Church of Canada received a new report from Bearing Faithful Witness; it then approved a statement on relations with Jews today. Their report states, in part, "No other religion is as closely related to Christianity as Judaism. The Christian God is the God of Israel. Jesus and all the apostles were of Israel (see Jewish Christians). Christian scripture includes the scriptures of Israel." They call for no longer seeking the conversion of Jews. The statement, United Church-Jewish Relations Today, "acknowledges a history of interpreting the New Testament in a way that has failed to acknowledge the context within Judaism in which many passages are rooted; rejects all teaching of contempt toward Jews and Judaism and the belief that God has abolished the covenant with the Jewish people; affirms the significance of Judaism as a religion, a people, and a covenant community and that the State of Israel has the right to exist in peace and security."

== See also ==
- Protestantism and Islam
- Mormonism and Judaism

== Sources ==
- Martin Brecht; tr. James L. Schaaf (1999). Martin Luther. 3: The Preservation of the Church, 1532–1546. Philadelphia: Fortress Press.
- Marty, Martin. Martin Luther. Viking Penguin, 2004.
- Richard Marius, Luther, London: Quartet, 1975, ISBN 0-7043-3192-6.
