= Menachem Kellner =

American philosopher

- מנחם קלנר
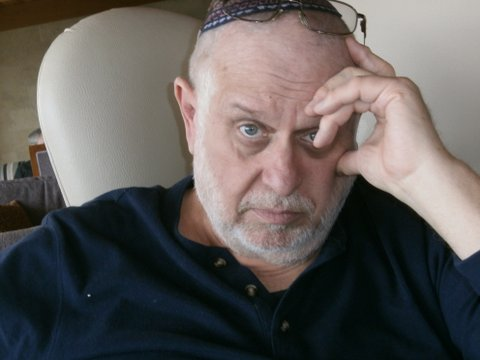
- Born: 1946; Albany, New York, United States
- Education: Washington University in St. Louis
- Occupations: Academic, Jewish scholar
- Employer: University of Haifa
- Known for: Must A Jew Believe Anything?

Menachem Kellner (Hebrew: מנחם קלנר; born 1946) is an American-Israeli academic and Jewish scholar of medieval Jewish philosophy with a particular focus on the philosophy of Maimonides. He is a retired Professor of Jewish Thought at the University of Haifa and is the founding chair of the Department of Philosophy and Jewish Thought at Shalem College in Jerusalem. He has taught courses in philosophy, religious studies, medieval and modern Jewish philosophy at Washington University in St. Louis, the College of William & Mary, the University of Virginia, and the University of Haifa. He is probably best known for his book Must A Jew Believe Anything?, which was a Koret Jewish Book Award finalist.

== Biography ==
Kellner was born in Albany, New York in 1946, and studied at the Hebrew Theological College in Skokie, Illinois and Yeshiva Mercaz HaRav in Jerusalem, Israel. He studied Western philosophy and Jewish philosophy at Washington University in St. Louis, receiving a B.A., M.A., and Ph.D. His Ph.D. dissertation was directed by Steven Schwarzschild. In 1980 he made aliyah to Israel.

== Publications ==
=== Books ===
- Should G̀-d ́exist? (1974)
- Maimonides and Gersonides on Mosaic Prophecy (1977)
- R. Isaac Abravanel on the Principles of Judaism (1978)
- Dogma in Medieval Jewish Thought: From Maimonides to Abravanel (1986)
- The Conception of the Torah as a Deductive Science in Medieval Jewish Thought (1987)
- Maimonides on Human Perfection (1990)
- Maimonides on Judaism and the Jewish People (1991)
- On the Status of the Astronomy and Physics in Maimonide's Mishneh Torah and Guide of the Perplexed (1991)
- Maimonides on the "Decline of the Generations" and the Nature of Rabbinic Authority (1996)
- Must A Jew Believe Anything? (1999)
- Maimonides Confrontation with Mysticism (2006)
- Science in Bet Midrash: Studies in Maimonides (2009)
- Torah in the Observatory: Gersonides, Maimonides, Song of Songs (2010)
- Reinventing Maimonides in Contemporary Jewish Thought (2019)

=== Translations ===
- He is the translator of Isaac Abarbanel’s Principles of Faith, Gersonides’ Commentary on Song of Songs, and Maimonides’ Book of Love.
