= Encyclopedia Talmudit =

Book

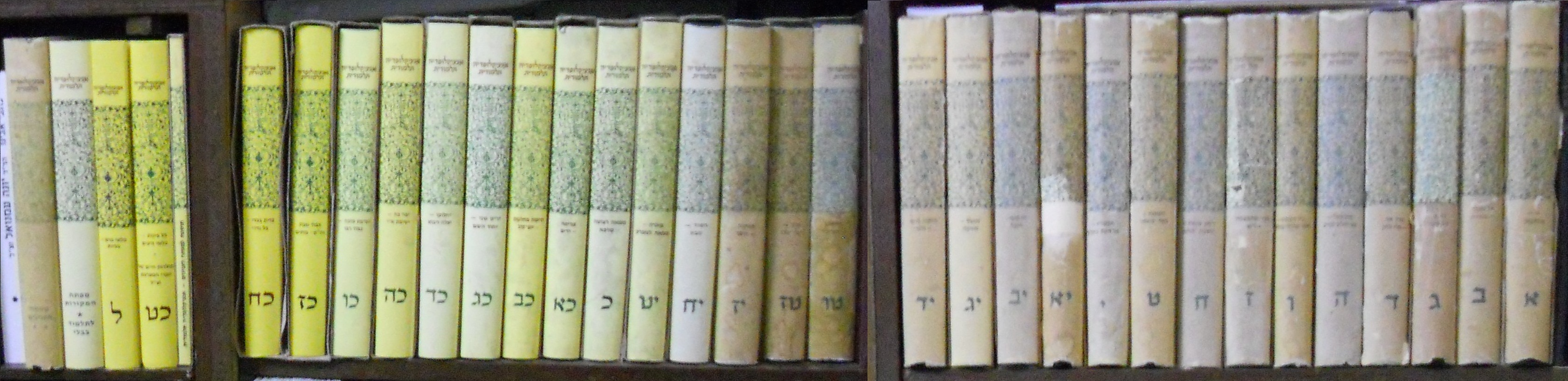

The Encyclopedia Talmudit (Hebrew: אנציקלופדיה תלמודית entsiyklopediah talmudiyt) is a Hebrew language encyclopedia that aims to summarize the halakhic topics of the Talmud in alphabetical order. It began in 1942 and is still an active project as of 2023, with 50 volumes (plus several index volumes) published so far. The 50th volume, known as the Jubilee volume, was published on January 18, 2023 in honor of Rabbi Hershel Schachter. Over half of the project is complete, and it is planned to be finished by 2024. The encyclopedia is published by the Torah literature publishing group Yad HaRav Herzog in Jerusalem, named after Rabbi Yitzhak HaLevi Herzog.

== Formation of the encyclopedia ==
The project began at the initiative of Rabbi Meir Bar-Ilan (Berlin) (1880–1949), the son of the Netziv. The concept was first described in a 1921 lecture by Chief Rabbi Abraham Isaac Kook, who outlined several projects for Torah scholars, including a work "that elucidates the essence of Torah principles, organized by encyclopedic entries." Bar-Ilan organized a group of notable editors. The purpose was to summarize all the Talmudic discussions and all the opinions of Rishonim and Acharonim in encyclopedia articles in alphabetical order.

The first edition of the first volume was published in 1947. This volume included 219 articles in an organized format of summaries. The same volume was reprinted three more times: in 1947, 1951, and 1955. After Bar-Ilan died in 1949, it was republished in a newly revised and expanded edition.

In 1947 Encyclopedia Talmudit won the city prize of Tel Aviv for Torah literature to honor the memory of Rabbi Abraham Isaac Kook.

Major Torah scholars, both Hasidim and Mitnagdim, supported the project. Supporters included Rabbi Menachem Mendel Schneerson, Rabbi Moshe Feinstein, Rabbi Yosef Shalom Eliashiv, Rabbi Yochanan Sofer, and others.

The administrator of the encyclopedia from its founding was Rabbi Yehoshua Hutner (1910–2009), who succeeded in securing the initiative with stable financial backing, thanks to his connections with leaders of the Mizrachi movement.

== Editors ==
Editors

The first editor-in-chief was Rabbi Shlomo Yosef Zevin (1886–1978). The first editors were Rabbi Benjamin Rabinovitz-Teomim, Rabbi Shimon Stralitz, Rabbi Yonah Merzbach and Rabbi Alter Hilevitz.

In later years tens of Torah scholars joined the editorial board, among them Rabbi Eliezer Waldenberg, the author of Tzitz Eliezer; Rabbi Isaac Epstein, the judge in the Tel Aviv Beit Din; Rabbi Yehuda Gershoni; Rabbi Shmuel Kroyzer; Rabbi Refael Shmulevitz, the Rosh Yeshiva of the Mir yeshiva (Jerusalem); Rabbi Azriel Levi, the chief editor of the Oz VeHadar version of the Talmud; and others.

In late 2006 Professor Avraham Steinberg took on the role of administrative director.

== Contents ==
Rabbi Zevin's style was to abbreviate and summarize wherever possible. In the first two volumes he followed an extremely brief format under the influence of Rabbi Bar-Ilan, but in later volumes published after Rabbi Bar-Ilan died the volumes are more encompassing, and include not only the essence of the subject but also many of its details and branched topics.

Rabbi Zevin established the listing of primary and secondary articles and the system of halakhic analysis of the encyclopedia. He edited the volumes that were published during his lifetime, and prepared other volumes until the end of letter Heth (ח).

The articles are organized in the following order: definition, sources, reasons and derivations, and various opinions. The first article was Aleph (א) and the last to date has been Kitvei ha-Qodesh (כ). The extent of development in the articles has expanded over time.

There are two volumes of indexes, including an index of topics and of citations from the Babylonian Talmud.

== Other editions ==
Encyclopedia Talmudit is also published on a computer version on a compact disc as part of the searchable Bar Ilan Responsa Project. (See Torah database.)

An online version of Encyclopedia Talmudit is available, linked from the published.

An abridged version has been published -- called Talmudic Micropedia, with nine volumes as of 2024, containing 1305 entries.

Encyclopedia Talmudica is an English translation, commenced 1969. The founding editors of the translation were Isidore Epstein and Harry Freedman.

== See also ==
- Association for Jewish Studies (U.S.)
- British Association for Jewish Studies
- Dead Sea Scrolls
- Encyclopedia Judaica
- Hebrew Publishing Company
- Jewish Encyclopedia
- Jewish English Bible translations
- Jewish Publication Society
- Judaica Press
- Koren Publishers Jerusalem
- National Library of Israel
- Rabbinic literature
- Sefaria
- Shorter Jewish Encyclopedia
- The New Jewish Encyclopedia
- Torah database
