= Elijah Benamozegh =

Italian Orthodox rabbi and Jewish Kabbalist (1823–1900)

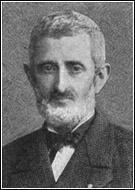
Elijah Benamozegh

Elijah Benamozegh (24 April 1823 – 6 February 1900), sometimes Elia or Eliyahu, was an Italian Sephardic Orthodox rabbi and renowned Jewish Kabbalist, highly respected in his day as one of Italy's most eminent Jewish scholars. He served for half a century as rabbi of the important Jewish community of Livorno, where the "Piazza Benamozegh" now commemorates his name and distinction. His major work is Israel and Humanity (1863), which was translated into English by Dr. Mordechai Luria in 1995.

== Life ==
He was born in Livorno. The name Benamozegh means "son of Amazigh". His father (Abraham) and mother (Clara), Moroccan Jewish natives of Fez, Morocco, died when Elijah was only four years old. He entered school early, where, besides instruction in the elementary sciences, he received tuition in Hebrew, English, and French, excelling in the latter. Benamozegh was fluent in various languages, and devoted himself later to the study of philosophy and theology, which he endeavored to reconcile with each other.

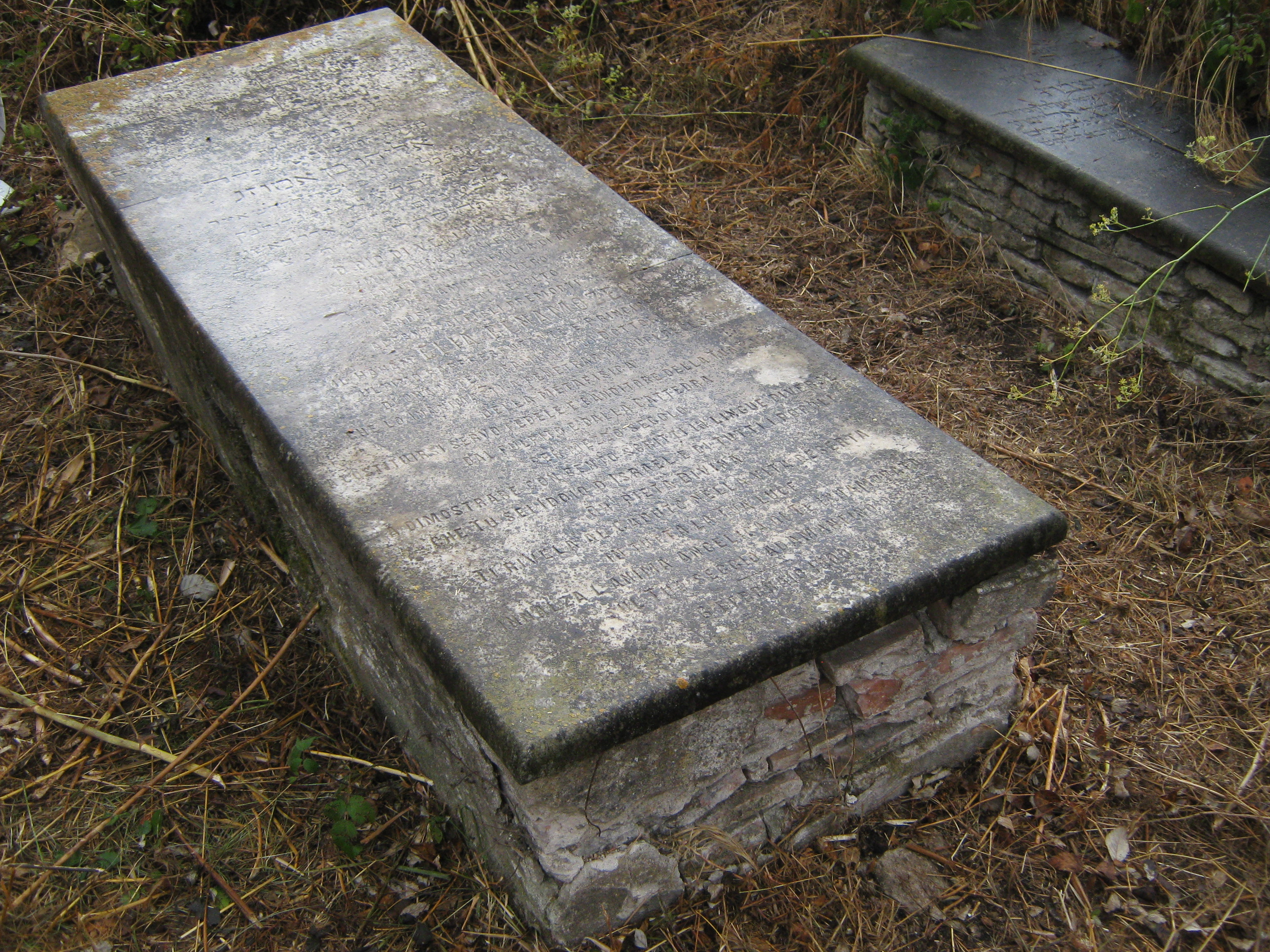
Tomb of Elijah Benamozegh

At the age of twenty-five he entered a commercial career, spending all his leisure time in study; but his natural tendency toward science and an active religious life soon caused him to abandon the pursuit of wealth. He then began to publish scientific and apologetic works, in which he revealed a great attachment to the Jewish religion, exhibiting at the same time a broad and liberal mind. His solicitude for Jewish traditions caused him to support Kabbalah. Later, Benamozegh was appointed rabbi and professor of theology at the rabbinical school of his native town; and, his other occupations notwithstanding, he continued to write and defend Jewish traditions until his death, in Livorno.

== Religious universalism ==
Benamozegh's works are noted for his free and uninhibited use of various non-Jewish religious sources, especially the New Testament and ancient Pagan mythology. Benamozegh even considered the Gospels to be a highly valuable Jewish Midrash, comparable to the Talmudic Aggadah. He respected Jesus as a wise rabbi and righteous Jew, but criticized the religious innovations of Paul and the invention of Christianity as a separate religion, which provoked the split of early Christianity from Judaism.

In his theological works, Benamozegh suggested to explain the Christian dogmas of the Trinity and Incarnation as an oversimplified and corrupt version of the Kabbalistic-panentheistic doctrine of Divine Emanations. While he disagreed with the Trinitarian Christian theology, he considered it, unlike most other Orthodox rabbis, an erroneous misunderstanding of subtle Kabbalistic doctrines rather than a major deviation from monotheism. Moreover, he claimed that Christianity is too monotheistic in comparison with the Kabbalah, which views all Pagan deities in their essence as partial manifestations or faces of the Absolute. Similarly, Benamozegh criticized the Christian view of Jesus as incarnated God on monistic or panentheistic grounds. According to Benamozegh's Kabbalistic view, the entire world is an incarnation of the Shekhinah, the feminine aspect of Divinity. He believed that Hinduism is closer in this respect to mystical Judaism than Christianity.

Benamozegh offered a novel mystical interpretation of Ludwig Feuerbach's atheistic philosophy. Feuerbach wrote that God is merely a product of human mind. Benamozegh explained that Feuerbach is essentially right; However, what people call "God" is a limited human perception of the apophatic, Infinite Absolute.

Indeed, dualistic, panentheistic, and highly complex views of the Godhead are common in the Kabbalistic literature. A number of known rabbis criticized Kabbalah for Gnostic-like dualistic views of God.

A particular interest was evolutionary theory and its universalist implications. Over time, Benamozegh came to view Darwin's theory of the common descent of all life as evidence in support of Kabbalistic teachings, which he synthesized to offer a majestic vision of cosmic evolution, with radical implications for understanding the development of morality and religion itself.

Benamozegh's universalist views were recently promoted by Adin Steinsaltz, who made a somewhat similar attempt to unify all major world religions and philosophies.

== Cosmopolitanism and patriotism ==
Benamozegh considered himself, simultaneously, an Italian patriot and a cosmopolitan. He believed that authentic mystical core of the Jewish tradition, which he called "Hebraism" as opposed to more isolationist exoteric Judaism, is profoundly universal and capable of uniting all world religions and nations into one brotherly cosmopolitan network. While Benamozegh believed in the unique spiritual mission of the Jews, his idea of Jewish chosenness was far from narrow particularism. According to his worldview, the Jews are chosen to serve the humanity as a priestly people, by proving a common mystical ground that transcends the boundaries of the nations and religious traditions. He also emphasized the impact of other cultures on Judaism, starting from the ancient Egyptian paganism, as well as the great role of the proselytes in the Jewish history. Unlike some exclusivist Kabbalists, Benamozegh believed that Kabbalah is a universal theology that unites all human beings and views them as equals.

At the same time, Benamozegh was a staunch Italian patriot. He even wrote a daring formulation, based on the Jewish declaration of faith: O Israelites, that you will always love Italy, that you will love her with all your heart, with all your soul, with all your mind. Apparently, according to his panentheistic philosophy, Benamozegh viewed the Italian soil as a specially beloved expression of the Shekhinah.

== Works ==
- "Emat Mafgia'" (The Fear of the Opponent), a refutation of Leon of Modena's attacks upon the Cabala, in 2 vols., Leghorn, 1858
- "Ger Tzedek" (A Righteous Proselyte), critical notes on Targum Onkelos, ib., 1858
- "Ner le-David" (Lamp of David), commentary on the Psalms, published together with the text, ib., 1858
- "Em la-Mikra" (Matrix of Scripture), commentary on the Pentateuch containing critical, philological, archeological, and scientific notes on the dogmas, history, laws, and customs of the ancient peoples, published together with the text under the title "Torat Adonai," Leghorn and Paris, 1862–65
- "Ta'am Leshad," refutation of Samuel David Luzzatto's dialogue on the Cabala, Leghorn, 1863
- 'Spinoza et la Kabbale', in L'Univers Israélite, Paris, 1863; (english translation "Spinoza and Kabbalah", éditions localement transcendantes, Puyméras, 2024)
- "Mebo Kelali," general introduction to the traditions of Judaism, published in "Ha-Lebanon," 1864, pp. 73 et seq.
- "Storia degli Esseni," Florence, 1865
- "Morale Juive et Morale Chrétienne. Examen Comparatif Suivi de Quelques Réflexions sur les Principes de l'Islamisme," Paris, 1867
- "Jewish and Christian Ethics with a Criticism on Mahomedism" (English translation of the above. E. Blochman, 1873)
- "Teologia Dogmatica ed Apologetica," Leghorn, 1877 (on metaphysics)
- "Le Crime de la Guerre Dénoncé à L'Humanité," Paris, 1881 (this work won for its author a medal and honorable mention from the League of Peace and Freedom, on the proposition of Jules Simon, Édouard Laboulaye, and Frédéric Passy)
- "Ya'aneh be-Esh" (He Will Answer Through Fire), discussion of cremation according to the Bible and the Talmud, Leghorn, 1886.
- "Israël et l'Humanité" (Israel and Humanity), discussion of universal religion and the roles of and relationships between Judaism, Christianity, and Islam, 1914 (posthumous, edited by Aimé Pallière).
- "Sori Gil'ad" originally published in "He-Lebanon", an argument for the integration of Torah and science. Republished in 2025 by Da'at Press under the title "Truth from All Sources: Rabbi Elia Benazmozegh's Case for the Integration of Torah and Science".
