= Steven Schwarzschild =

American philosopher (1924–1989)

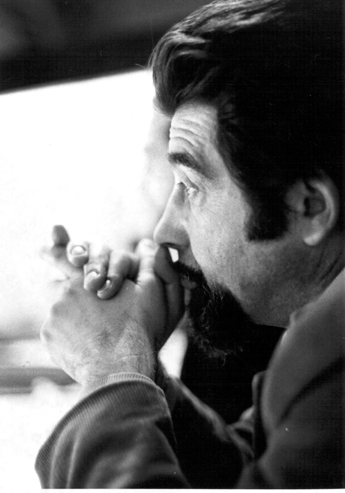
Steven S. Schwarzschild

Steven S. Schwarzschild (1924– December 2, 1989) was a rabbi, philosopher, theologian, and editor.

== Biography ==
Schwarzschild was born in Frankfurt am Main, Germany and grew up in Berlin. He escaped to the United States with his family in 1939.

He received ordination at Hebrew Union College in Cincinnati in 1948. After returning to Berlin to serve as rabbi of the Berlin Jewish Community under the auspices of the World Union for Progressive Judaism he met Lily Rose (1913–2009) whom he later married. In 1950 he returned to the United States serving in Temples in Lynn, Massachusetts, where he came into contact with Rabbi Joseph B. Soloveitchik of Boston whom he came to view as an important teacher, and in Fargo, North Dakota. He was a member of both Reform and Conservative rabbinic assemblies.

In 1965, he was elected Professor of Philosophy and Judaic Studies in the School of Arts and Sciences at Washington University in St. Louis.

He edited the journal Judaism-A Quarterly Journal from 1961 until 1969 and was the senior editor of the Werke of Hermann Cohen.

His expertise was on Maimonides, Hermann Cohen, and Immanuel Kent.

He was awarded an honorary degree by the Hebrew Union College – Jewish Institute of Religion.

Both in person and by correspondence he entered into dialogue with the American Mennonite theologian and pacifist John Howard Yoder, with the American Catholic monk and writer Thomas Merton, and with many leading figures in philosophy and in Jewish thought.

On December 2, 1989, he died at Jewish Hospital after suffering an aneurysm.

== Contribution to Jewish philosophy ==
The topic of his dissertation was the thought of Nachman Krochmal and Hermann Cohen as philosophers of history.

He published a series of academic journal articles on Jewish philosophical and theological topics such as Jewish ethics, aesthetics, messianism, eschatology, halakha, and the role of rationalism and the philosophies of notable Jewish philosophers such as Martin Buber, Hermann Cohen, Theodor W. Adorno, Karl Marx, Spinoza, Moses Mendelssohn and Maimonides. He also showed an interest in the thought of rabbis such as Isaac Hutner, Joseph B. Soloveitchik and Joel Teitelbaum.

Following Hermann Cohen, Schwarzschild espoused a form of neo-Kantianism and emphasized the role of the halakha in Judaism as a rational system of moral ideals. He was also strongly influenced by Maimonides.

== Political views ==
In other essays, he expressed pacifist and democratic socialist views and critiqued Zionism.

He asserted at the National Interreligious Conference on Peace:

"When God, the Radical, demands that we seek peace, He demands that we radically seek radical peace...not only when it fits into the political plans of our government, nor only when it is socially safe to talk about it, nor yet to the degree to which this seems practically prudent and promising of results, but under the irresistible command of God, always, everywhere, in every way, and totally, religion must insist on, explore, and practice the ways of peace toward the attainment of peace." (Judaism, Fall 1966).

== Books and Articles ==
- Judaism and Modern Western Philosophy: Collected Writings of Steven S. Schwarzschild, vol 1, Springer Nature, Amsterdam 2024 (ed. George Y. Kohler and Daniel H. Weiss)
- The Tragedy of Optimism - Steven Schwarzschild's Writings on Hermann Cohen, State University NY Press, New York 2018 (ed. George Y. Kohler)
- The Pursuit of the Ideal: Jewish Writings of Steven Schwarzschild, State University NY Press, New York 1990 (ed. Menachem Kellner)
- 'The Personal Messiah-Toward the Restoration of a Discarded Doctrine,' (1956), in Kellner, M. (ed.),The Pursuit of the Ideal: Jewish Writings of Steven Schwarzschild (1990), (State University of New York Press)
- 'Franz Rosenzweig and Existentialism,'(1956), in Year Book of the Central Conference of American Rabbis,
- 'Do Noachites Have to Believe in Revelation? (A Passage in Dispute between Maimonides, Spinoza, Mendelssohn, and Hermann Cohen). A Contribution to a Jewish View of Natural Law,' (1962), in Kellner, M. (ed.), The Pursuit of the Ideal: Jewish Writings of Steven Schwarzschild (1990), (State University of New York Press)
- 'To Re-Cast Rationalism,' (1962), in Frank, D. Leaman, O. and Manekin, C.H. (ed.), (2000), The Jewish Philosophy Reader, (Cambridge University Press).
- 'The Lure of Immmanence-The Crisis in Contemporary Religious Thought,' (1967), in Kellner, M. (ed.), The Pursuit of the Ideal: Jewish Writings of Steven Schwarzschild (1990), (State University of New York Press)
- 'Judaism, Scriptures, and Ecumenism,' (1967), Neusner, J. (ed.), Judaism and Christianity: The New Relationship, (1993), (Garland Pub.)
- 'On the Theology of Jewish Survival,' (1968), in Kellner, M. (ed.), The Pursuit of the Ideal: Jewish Writings of Steven Schwarzschild (1990), (State University of New York Press)
- 'A Note on the Nature of Ideal Society-A Rabbinic Study,' in Kellner, M. (ed.), The Pursuit of the Ideal: Jewish Writings of Steven Schwarzschild (1990), (State University of New York Press)
- 'The Legal Foundation of Jewish Aesthetics,' (1975), in Kellner, M. (ed.), Kellner, M. (ed.), The Pursuit of the Ideal: Jewish Writings of Steven Schwarzschild (1990), (State University of New York Press)
- 'The Tenability of Herman Cohen's Construction of the Self,' (1975), Journal of the History of Philosophy, Vol. 13, No. 3
- 'The Question of Jewish Ethics Today,' (1976), in Kellner, M. (ed.), The Pursuit of the Ideal: Jewish Writings of Steven Schwarzschild (1990), (State University of New York Press)
- 'Moral Radicalism and "Middlingness" in the Ethics of Maimonides,' (1977), in Kellner, M. (ed.), The Pursuit of the Ideal: Jewish Writings of Steven Schwarzschild (1990), (State University of New York Press)
- 'Jean-Paul Sartre as Jew,' (1983), in Kellner, M. (ed.), The Pursuit of the Ideal: Jewish Writings of Steven Schwarzschild (1990), (State University of New York Press)
- 'An Introduction to the Thought of R. Isaac Hutner,' Modern Judaism, (1985), Vol. 5, No. 3
- 'A Critique of Martin Buber's Political Philosophy-An Affectionate Reappraisal,' (1986), in Kellner, M. (ed.),The Pursuit of the Ideal: Jewish Writings of Steven Schwarzschild (1990), (State University of New York Press)
- 'On Jewish Eschatology,' (1986), in Kellner, M. (ed.), The Pursuit of the Ideal: Jewish Writings of Steven Schwarzschild (1990), (State University of New York Press)
- 'Modern Jewish Philosophy,' (1987), in Kellner, M. (ed.), The Pursuit of the Ideal: Jewish Writings of Steven Schwarzschild (1990), (State University of New York Press)
- 'Shekhinah and Eschatology,' (1987), in Kellner, M. (ed.), The Pursuit of the Ideal: Jewish Writings of Steven Schwarzschild (1990), (State University of New York Press)
- 'Adorno and Schoenberg as Jews Between Kant and Hegel,' Leo Baeck Institute Yearbook, (1990), 35
- 'The Unnatural Jew,' in Yaffe, M.D. (ed), Judaism and Environmental Ethics: A Reader, (2001), (Lexington Books.)
