= Shlomo Yosef Zevin =

Israeli Orthodox rabbi and scholar (1888–1978)

Rabbi Shlomo Yosef Zevin
- שלמה יוסף זווין
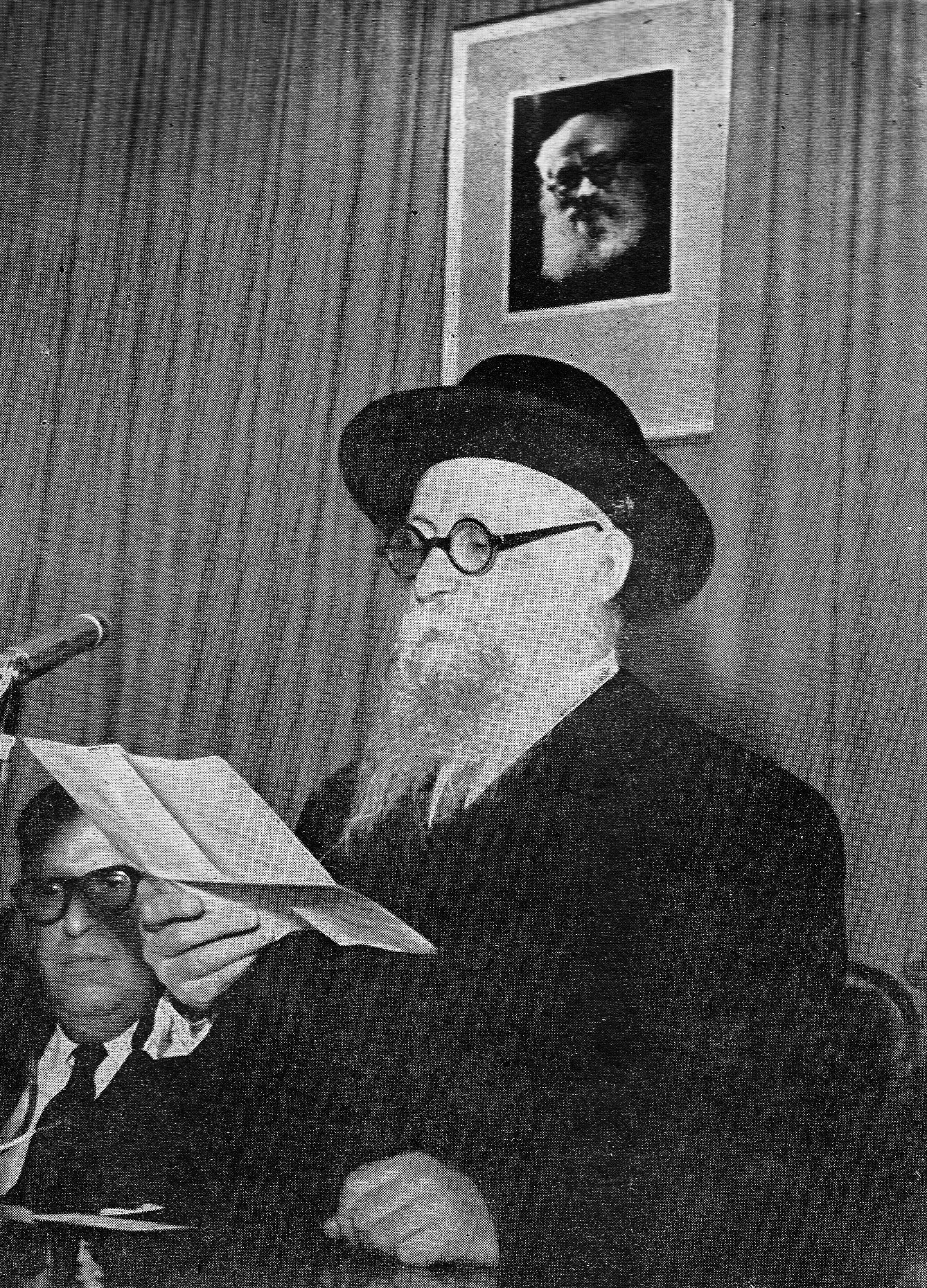
- Rabbi Zevin next to Abba Eban

Personal life
- Born: December 1886 Kazimirov, near Minsk, Russian Empire
- Died: February 28, 1978 (aged 91) Israel
- Parent: Aharon Mordechai (father)
- Known for: Founding and editing the Encyclopedia Talmudit
- Occupation: Rabbi, editor

Religious life
- Religion: Judaism
- Denomination: Orthodox

Jewish leader
- Awards: Israel Prize (1959); Yakir Yerushalayim (1967)

Shlomo Yosef Zevin (Hebrew: שלמה יוסף זווין; born December 1886; died 28 February 1978) was one of the most prominent Orthodox, Religious Zionist rabbis of the 20th century. He founded the Encyclopedia Talmudit, a Hebrew Halachic Encyclopedia, of which he was chief editor until his death.

== Rabbinate and scholarship ==
Shlomo Yosef Zevin was born in 1886 in Kazimirov (near Minsk), where his father, Aharon Mordechai, served as rabbi. The younger Zevin’s education was a combination of both “Litvishe” (Lithuanian) and Hasidic influences; he studied first in the Yeshiva of Mir under Rabbi Eliyahu Baruch Kamai (where he was the study partner of Rabbi Yechiel Yaakov Weinberg) and then in Bobruisk, under Rabbi Shemaryahu Noach Schneerson, then leader of the Kapust branch of the Chabad hasidic dynasty. Zevin was ordained by Rabbi Schneerson, Rabbi Yosef Rosen (the Rogatchover Gaon), and Rabbi Yechiel Michel Epstein (author of Aruch Hashulchan).

At a young age Rabbi Zevin was appointed rabbi of his birthplace, Kazimirov, and served as editor of the journal "Shaarei Torah." He later served as rabbi of Klimov (now Klimovo) and Novozybkov. He took an active role in the underground struggle to preserve Jewish observance in Soviet Russia after the Communist Revolution; this effort was headed by Rabbi Yosef Yitzchok Schneersohn. Beginning in 1921, he edited a Torah journal, Yagdil Torah, together with Rabbi Yehezkel Abramsky of Slutsk; for this crime he was imprisoned by the Communist authorities. He founded Orthodox Jewish journals that dealt with problems of the time.

At the age of 18, Rabbi Zevin began corresponding with leading sages, including the Rogatchover Gaon and Rabbi Yosef Yitzchok Schneersohn. He also began at a young age to serve Russian Jewry in various communal capacities. During the brief period of Ukrainian independence after World War I, Rabbi Zevin served as a member of the Ukrainian parliament. He also served as a member and officer of the parent body of Jewish communities in Ukraine.

In 1935, Rabbi Zevin settled in the Land of Israel and began teaching at the Mizrachi-affiliated Bet Midrash L’morim. He also served as a member of the Israeli Chief Rabbinate Council.

He held religious Zionist views and would eat a festive meal on Israeli Independence Day.

In 1947 the first volume of the Encyclopedia Talmudit was published under his editorial oversight. Zevin continued to serve as editor-in-chief until his death in 1978. This multi-volume work continues today.

Rabbi Zevin frequently corresponded with Rabbi Menachem Mendel Schneerson, the Lubavitcher Rebbe, whom he had met for the first time in Russia in the mid-1920s. Part of this correspondence is printed in the Igrot Kodesh series. He was also among the influential scholars to encourage Rabbi Menachem Mendel Schneerson to accept the leadership over the Chabad movement after the passing of Rabbi Yosef Yitzchok Schneersohn, in 1950. He used concepts in Chabad philosophy to clarify halachic principles.

== Awards ==
- In 1959, Rabbi Zevin received the Israel Prize for Rabbinic literature.
- In 1967, he received the Yakir Yerushalayim (Worthy Citizen of Jerusalem) award, the year of the award's inauguration.

== Published works ==
- Encyclopedia Talmudit - a Talmudic / Halachic encyclopedia; he founded the encyclopedia together with Rabbi Meir Bar-Ilan and edited the volumes that were released in his lifetime;

Additionally, Zevin authored nine other works, including;

- L’Ohr Ha’halachah – essays on both practical and abstract halachic topics, including a halachic analysis of the legal and moral questions presented in Shakespeare’s Merchant of Venice;
- Ha’moadim Be’halachah – halachic studies of the Jewish festivals;
- Ishim Ve’shitot – biographies of selected 19th and 20th century sages with analyses of their individual methods of study;
- La’Torah Ve’la’moadim – essays on the Torah and the festivals; and
- Sippurei Chassidim – Chassidic tales arranged by parsha and festival.
- Sofrim U'Sefarim – reviews of Torah literature

== See also ==
- List of Israel Prize recipients
