= Split of Christianity and Judaism =

Historical emergence of Christianity

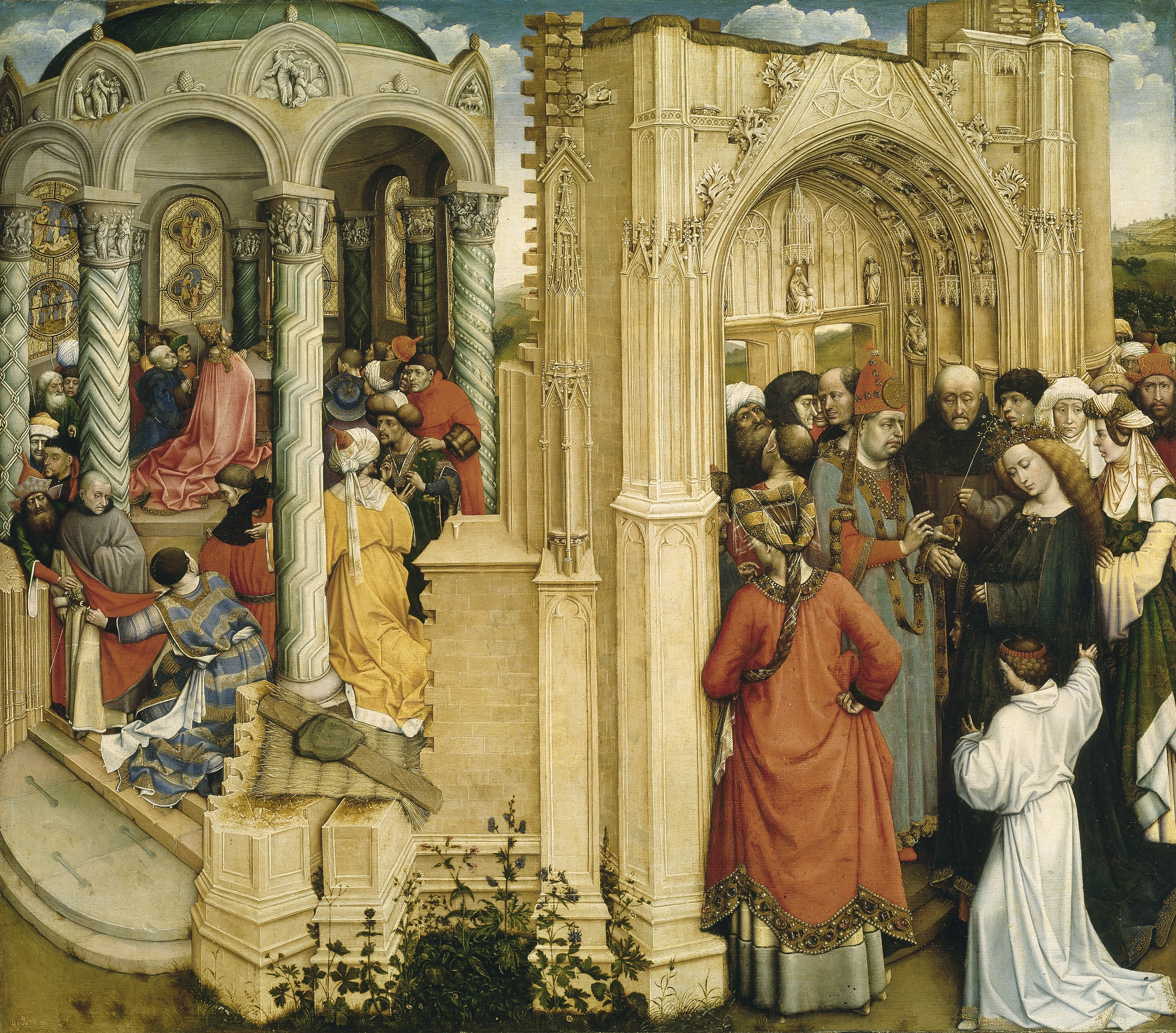
Marriage of the Virgin by Robert Campin, c. 1420, illustrates the symbolic foundation of Christianity on Judaism through the depiction of Mary and Joseph's marriage at the unfinished portal of a Gothic church, built upon the Romanesque Temple of Jerusalem.

Christianity as a movement began within Second Temple Judaism, but the two gradually diverged over the first few centuries of the Christian Era, and the Christian movement perceived itself as a distinct religion from Judaism by the fourth century. Historians continue to debate the dating of Christianity's emergence as a religion distinct from Judaism. Philip S. Alexander characterizes the question of when Christianity and Judaism parted company (often termed the "parting of the ways") as "one of those deceptively simple questions which should be approached with great care". According to historian Shaye J. D. Cohen, "the separation of Christianity from Judaism was a process, not an event", in which the Church became "more and more gentile, and less and less Jewish". Conversely, various historical events have been proposed as definitive points of separation, including the Council of Jerusalem and the First Council of Nicaea.

Historiography of the split is complicated by a number of factors, including the diverse and syncretic range of religious thought and practice within Early Christianity and early Rabbinic Judaism (both of which were far less orthodox and theologically homogeneous in the first centuries of the Christian Era than they are today) and the coexistence of and interaction between Judaism, Jewish Christianity, and Gentile Christianity over a period of centuries at the beginning of Early Christianity. Scholars have found evidence of continuous interactions between Jewish-Christian and Rabbinic movements from the mid-to late second century CE to the fourth century CE. The first centuries of belief in Jesus have been described by historians as characterized by religious creativity and "chaos".

The two religions eventually established and distinguished their respective norms and doctrines, notably by increasingly diverging on key issues such as the status of "purity laws" and the validity of Judeo-Christian messianic beliefs.

== Background and history ==
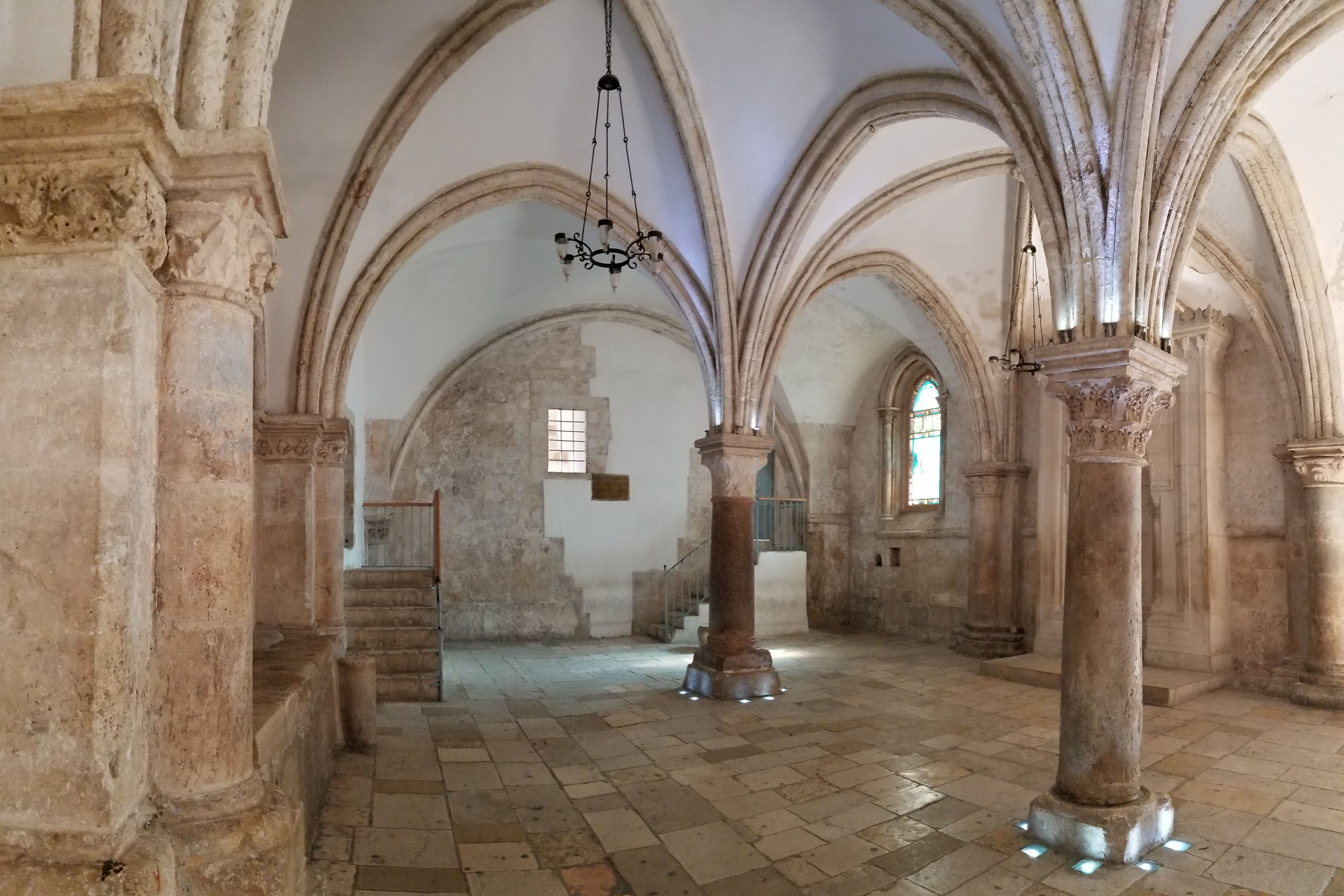
The Cenacle on Mount Zion in Jerusalem, claimed to be the location of the Last Supper and Pentecost

Christianity originated as a Jewish movement in Judaea during the 1st century AD, within the context of late Second Temple Judaism. The earliest followers of Jesus were Jews who understood his life, death and expected return through familiar Jewish apocalyptic and messianic frameworks. They remained embedded in Jewish religious life and did not initially conceive of themselves as departing from Israel or founding a new faith. Following their conviction that Jesus had been raised from the dead, they established a community in Jerusalem that awaited Jesus's return and eschatological renewal, seeking to spread this message throughout Israel and the Jewish diaspora. (Note: Many scholars consider the Parousia in the gospels to be contingent, though with detractors. The timing of the end in early Christian expectation is also debated.) Early Jewish Christianity maintained a high Christology alongside monotheism. This early community was led by the three Pillars of the Church, namely James the Just, Peter, and John. What eventually became of this earliest Christ-following community remains unclear; they were possibly displaced, relocated, or killed when the Romans destroyed Jerusalem in 70 AD.

Meanwhile, as the message about Jesus spread beyond Judea and Galilee into the broader Greco-Roman world, it increasingly attracted Gentile adherents, especially among "God-fearers": non-Jews who were attracted to Judaism and participated in synagogal worship without fully converting. This created a challenge for the movement's Jewish religious outlook, which insisted on close observance of the Jewish commandments. Against this backdrop, Paul the Apostle, a Jew of the Pharisaic school who had initially persecuted the Jesus movement, became one of its most influential missionaries following his conversion, focusing on spreading the message to non-Jews in the Eastern Mediterranean. Paul argued that Gentiles could participate in the promises of Israel through exclusive devotion to the God of Israel, faith in Christ, baptism, and participation in his death and resurrection, without full adherence to the Torah, including circumcision. This had a formative effect on the emerging Christian identity as separate from Judaism. Over time, such developments contributed to the gradual differentiation between the Jesus movement and other Jewish communities, a process that resulted in the emergence of Christianity as a separate religion.

=== Hellenistic Judaism ===
Shaye J.D. Cohen writes that "Even the most Hellenized of Jews, e.g. Philo of Alexandria, belonged to Jewish communities that were socially distinct from “the Greeks,” no matter how well these Jews spoke Greek, knew Greek literature, and assimilated Greek culture high and low."

=== Second Temple period ===
There were numerous first-century Jewish sects interpreting the Torah (the Talmud refers to twenty-four such sects).

=== Jewish Christianity ===
Most historians agree that Jesus or his followers established a new Jewish sect, one that attracted both Jewish and gentile converts. According to New Testament scholar Bart D. Ehrman, a number of early Christianities existed in the first century CE, from which developed various Christian traditions and denominations, including proto-orthodoxy. According to theologian James D. G. Dunn, four types of early Christianity can be discerned: Jewish Christianity, Hellenistic Christianity, Apocalyptic Christianity, and early Catholicism.

The first followers of Jesus were essentially all ethnically Jewish or Jewish proselytes. Jesus was Jewish, preached to the Jewish people, and called from them his first followers. According to McGrath, Jewish Christians, as faithful religious Jews, "regarded their movement as an affirmation of every aspect of contemporary Judaism, with the addition of one extra belief—that Jesus was the Messiah."

On the subject of the separation of early Christian belief from Judaism, Shaye J. D. Cohen writes that early Jewish believers in Christ "had a choice: they could join the emerging Christian communities which were being populated more and more by gentile Christians; or they could try to maintain their place within Jewish society, a stance that will become harder and harder to maintain as the decades go by; or, if they were uncomfortable among non-Jewish Christians and non-Christian Jews, they could try to maintain their own communities, separate from each of the others." He writes that the New Testament shows that, among Christ-believing Jews in the first century, the norm was to join the emerging gentile-populated Christian communities. But as these communities became more hostile to non-Christian Jews, the Christ-believing Jews were pushed to compromise either their Jewish identities or their belonging within the Christian communities.

By the second century, Romans regarded Christians and Jews as separate communities, persecuting Christians without targeting Jews. Second-century Christian writers regularly accused the Jews of collaborating with the Romans in their anti-Christian persecutions. Eusebius attests to a Christian converting to Judaism in order to escape Roman persecution. The opposite is true, too; when the Romans persecuted Jews, they ignored Christians.

=== Jews and Christians in Roman writings ===
Almost all early pagan accounts of Christianity that mention Christians do not explicitly associate them with Jews. Tacitus (Annals, c. 116 CE) acknowledges that Christianity originated in Judaea but does not emphasize its Jewish roots. In Suetonius (The Twelve Caesars, c. 121 CE), there is no direct connection between the two groups; Jews are classified as a gens, while Christians are labeled a superstitio. By the early 2nd century, the distinction between Jews and Christians was evident outside of Judaea, where Christian communities, largely composed of Gentile converts influenced by the Pauline doctrines, did not adopt Jewish practices beyond monotheism and rejecting idolatry. Roman legal actions against Christians further confirm that authorities recognized them as separate from Jews.

== Historiography ==
Daniel Boyarin describes a traditional (and in his view, errant) understanding of Judeo-Christian origins in 1999's Dying For God:

Not long ago, everyone knew that Judaism came before Christianity. The story would go that Christianity developed out of the "orthodox" Judaism of the first century, rabbinic Judaism, and either deviated from the true path or superseded its ancestor.

He writes that this narrative, which he calls the "old paradigm", was propagated in "more or less the same" form by both Christian and Jewish scholars, with an understanding of pre-Christian Jews that anachronistically reduced their religious diversity into a single "Judaism". Israel Yuval described the paradigm as seeing early Christianity "only as influenced and not as influencing". In the late 20th century, scholars began to favor a more complex view of pre-Christian Judaism, and came to understand early Christianity and Rabbinic Judaism as "sister religions that were crystallized in the same period and the same background of enslavement and destruction."

=== Parting of the ways ===
The term parting of the ways refers to a historical concept figuring the emergence of Christianity's distinction from Judaism as a split in paths, with the two religions separating like two branching roadways "never to cross or converge again". While most uses of the metaphor consider Christianity and Judaism as two equally-important roadways, some use it to describe Judaism as the main "highway" from which Christianity forked. The metaphor may also refer to an interpersonal "parting", as in human relationships when two parties no longer see eye to eye and decide to "go their separate ways".

Reed and Becker describe a "master narrative" of Jewish and Christian history that is guided by the parting concept, which describes a first-century Judaism characterized by great diversity, with exchange between Christ-believing and non-Christ-believing Jews, that was fundamentally changed in the wake of the Second Temple's destruction and the later Bar Kokhba revolt of the Jews against Roman rule, after which Christianity and Judaism "definitively institutionalized their differences". The master narrative recognizes this period as the point from which Judaism's influence on Christianity was limited to the Jewish scriptures that the Church held as their Old Testament.

The parting of the ways is the most commonly used metaphor in contemporary scholarship on the topic of Christianity's historical distinction from Judaism, and the notion has been subject to a number of debates, criticisms, and metaphorical adaptations from scholars. Judith Lieu has argued for a "criss-crossing of muddy tracks which only the expert tracker, or poacher, can decipher" over the parting metaphor, while Daniel Boyarin describes a continuum along which one could travel rather than a divide or partition between rabbinic Judaism and Christianity. Scholarly works on the matter of the concept of the parting of the ways have been published under such titles as "The Ways That Never Parted", "The Ways That Often Parted", and "The Ways That Parted".

==== Reception and criticism ====
In the Introduction to The Ways That Never Parted, Annette Reed and Adam Becker identify two fundamental assumptions guiding the parting model: that "Judaism and Christianity developed in relative isolation from one another," and that "the interactions between Jews and Christians after the second century were limited, almost wholly, to polemical conflict and mutual misperception." Reed and Becker, however, describe a literary and archaeological record of interaction between Jewish and Christian communities that suggests a "far messier reality" than that suggested by the parting concept, citing theological literature in which Jews and Christians reacted to one another's theologies and religions. Shaye J. D. Cohen, who upholds the parting narrative, argues conversely that "the notion of 'the parting of the ways' does not in the least suggest that Jews and Christians stopped speaking with each other, arguing with each other, and influencing each other," and that reactions to Christianity in rabbinic scholarship neither prove nor disprove such a parting, and only prove that Jews and Christians continued to speak with one another after their parting. Cohen also writes that "There was no parting of the ways between gentile Christians and non-Christian Jews for the simple reason that their ways had never been united."

Philip S. Alexander describes motivations for both Christian and Jewish scholars in upholding and propagating the parting of the ways: "The attempt [to lay down a norm for Judaism in the first century] barely conceals apologetic motives—in the case of Christianity a desire to prove that Christianity transcended or transformed Judaism, in the case of Jews a desire to suggest that Christianity was an alien form of Judaism which deviated from the true path."

=== Other metaphors ===
Historians of Early Christianity have been "inventive in creating metaphors" to explain and illustrate the emergence of Christianity from Judaism. Philip S. Alexander posited a Venn diagram to compare to the process of Christianity's differentiation from Judaism, with the two religions beginning as two overlapping circles, which gradually moved apart until they were entirely separated. Daniel Boyarin commends Alexander's Venn diagram image for complicating the dominant "parting of the ways" notion of Christian historical distinction, but regards the metaphor as still being too simple for the "reconfiguring [of the historical narrative of Christianity's emergence] that needs to be done". Among the several metaphors proposed by James Dunn is the metaphor of a textile, which illustrated first-century Judaism as a woven textile, and Early Christianity as one of its fibers. Both Dunn and Daniel Boyarin have used body of water metaphors: Dunn described Rabbinic Judaism and Early Christianity as two currents that eventually carved separate channels from the stream of ancient Judaism, and Boyarin described Early Christianity as one of many first-century Jewish movements that flowed out from one source, like ripples on a pond's surface.

==== Kinship ====
Metaphors of family and kinship "dominated" nineteenth- and twentieth-century academic discussion of the relationship between Judaism and Christianity, and are still used in contemporary scholarship. Daniel Boyarin calls the understanding propagated with the use of this metaphor "the old paradigm". A mother-child metaphor was particularly common in the nineteenth century, with Christianity as the child born from and nurtured by Judaism. Adele Reinhartz criticizes this formulation for its implication that Judaism was a single entity, when in fact it was "an ever-shifting set of groups". Boyarin identified the mother-daughter metaphor, which he attributes to Jacob Lauterbach, as "a typical example of how the myth [of Judaism and Christianity as 'self-identical religious organisms'] works". Alexander described the historical reduction of pre-Christian Jewish religious diversity into the singular entity of "Judaism" as taking place in two distinct ways: through the anachronistic "retrojection" of Rabbinic Judaism onto first-century Pharisaic Judaism, and through the assumption that all first-century Jewish religions shared some common features that allowed them to be joined into a single religion.

Alan Segal proposed a sibling metaphor as more accurate than that of the mother and daughter. Segal's metaphor compares the two religions to the biblical twins Jacob and Esau, "Rebecca's children", in acknowledgment of their "mother": Second Temple Judaism. Daniel Boyarin identified this interpretation of the two "new" religions as "part of one complex religious family, twins in a womb, contending with each other for identity and precedence, but sharing with each other the same spiritual food" for at least three centuries, as a new scholarly paradigm that overtook the "old paradigm" of the mother-daughter metaphor. Boyarin suggested that kinship metaphors should be abandoned altogether, because they erroneously imply a separation of first-century Judaism and Christianity as organic, definite entities. He proposed "a model of shared and crisscrossing lines of history and religious development", describing Judaism and Christianity in late antiquity as two points on a continuum, with Marcionites and non-Christ-following Jews at each end, respectively.

== Causes ==
=== Social ===
Shaye J. D. Cohen argues that, while theological disputes between Jews and followers of Christ contributed to the social separation of the two groups, the disputes themselves had no direct connection to the parting; instead, the split of Christians from Jews was a process of social separation.

=== Intellectual ===
Emanuel Fiano examines the parting as a split of intellectual traditions, with the emergence of Christian theology reifying gentile Christianity as a discrete religion from Judaism.

== Proposed points of separation ==
=== Life and ministry of Jesus ===
Most historians agree that Jesus or his followers established a new Jewish sect, one that attracted both Jewish and gentile converts. According to New Testament scholar Bart D. Ehrman, a number of early Christianities existed in the first century CE, from which developed various Christian traditions and denominations, including proto-orthodoxy. According to theologian James D. G. Dunn, four types of early Christianity can be discerned: Jewish Christianity, Hellenistic Christianity, Apocalyptic Christianity, and early Catholicism.

The first followers of Jesus, including the Virgin Mary, John the Baptist, all twelve apostles, most of the seventy disciples, and Paul the Apostle, were mostly ethnically Jewish or Jewish proselytes. Jesus was Jewish, preached to the Jewish people (Matthew 15:24), and called from them his first followers. According to McGrath, Jewish Christians, as faithful religious Jews, "seemed to regard Christianity as an affirmation of every aspect of contemporary Judaism, with the addition of one extra belief—that Jesus was the Messiah."

Most of Jesus's teachings were intelligible and acceptable in terms of Second Temple Judaism; what set Christians apart from Jews was their faith in Christ as the resurrected messiah. While Christianity acknowledges only one ultimate Messiah, Judaism can be said to hold to a concept of multiple messiahs. The two most relevant are the Messiah ben Joseph and the traditional Messiah ben David. Some scholars have argued that the idea of two messiahs, one suffering and the second fulfilling the traditional messianic role, was normative to ancient Judaism, predating Jesus. Jesus would have been viewed by many as one or both.

=== Pauline epistles ===
Paul the Apostle was, before his conversion, the main antagonist of Christianity. Initially he persecuted the "church of God," (Note: Galatians 1:13. Some authors claim Paul persecuted the "Hellenists" of Acts 6. Others believe there was no theological divide between "Hellenists" (Greek speaking Jews from the diaspora who had returned to Jerusalem) and their fellow Jesus-followers; Paul's persecution was directed against the Jesus-movement in general, because it offended his Pharisaic convictions.) then converted and adopted the title of "Apostle to the Gentiles" and started proselytizing among the gentiles. He opposed the strict applications of Jewish customs for converts, and argued with the leaders of the Jerusalem Church to allow gentile converts exemption from most Jewish commandments at the Council of Jerusalem.

Paul was Jewish, referring to himself even after his conversion as a Jew (Note: Acts 22:3 "I am a Jew, born in Tarsus in Cilicia".) "circumcised the eighth day, of the stock of Israel, of the tribe of Benjamin, a Hebrew of the Hebrews" (Philippians 3:5). However, Paul fiercely denounced "Judaizers" who sought to impose Jewish laws on Christians. Based on some passages in his letters, Paul is sometimes credited with originating the doctrine of supersessionism: that the New Covenant through Jesus Christ has superseded or replaced the Mosaic covenant and therefore the Christian Church has superseded the Jewish people as God's chosen people. In Galatians 1:13–14, he becomes the first writer by almost half a century to refer to Judaism and Christianity as two separate religions.

=== Council of Jerusalem ===
The Jerusalem Church was an early Christian community located in Jerusalem, of which James the Just, the brother of Jesus, and Peter were leaders. Paul was affiliated with this community. Paul and Barnabas were sent from Antioch to confer with the Jerusalem Church over whether Gentile Christians need to keep the Jewish Law and be circumcised. James played a prominent role in the formulation of the council's decision (Acts 15:19 NRSV) that circumcision was not a requirement. Paul says that James, Peter and John will minister to the "circumcised" (in general Jews and Jewish Proselytes) in Jerusalem, while Paul and his fellows will minister to the "uncircumcised" (in general Gentiles) (Galatians 2:9). (Note: The terms "circumcised" and "uncircumcised" are generally understood to refer to Jews and Greeks respectively; however, this is an oversimplification, as first-century Judaea also had Jews who no longer circumcised, and Greeks and others such as Syrians, Egyptians, and Arabs who did.)

=== Destruction of the Second Temple ===
The First Jewish–Roman War, and the destruction of the Temple, was a main event in the development of both early Christianity and Rabbinic Judaism. Full scale open revolt against the Romans occurred with the First Jewish–Roman War in 66 CE. In 70 CE the Temple was destroyed. The destruction of the Second Temple was a profoundly traumatic experience for the Jews, who were now confronted with difficult and far-reaching questions. (Note: Such as: How to achieve atonement without the Temple?; How to explain the disastrous outcome of the rebellion?; How to live in the post-Temple, Romanized world?; How to connect present and past traditions?; How people answered these questioned depended largely on their position prior to the revolt.)

Many historians argue that the gospels took their final form after the Great Revolt and the destruction of the Temple, although some scholars put the authorship of Mark in the 60s; this could help one understand their context. Strack theorizes that the growth of a Christian canon (the New Testament) was a factor that influenced the rabbis to record the oral law in writing. (Note: The theory that the destruction of the Temple and subsequent upheaval led to the committing of Oral Law into writing was first explained in the Epistle of Sherira Gaon and often repeated.)

A significant contributing factor to the split was the two groups' differing theological interpretations of the Temple's destruction. Rabbinic Judaism saw the destruction as a chastisement for neglecting the Torah. The early Christians however saw it as God's punishment for the Jewish rejection of Jesus, leading to the claim that the "true" Israel was now the Church. Jews believed this claim was scandalous. According to Fredriksen, since early Christians believed that Jesus had already replaced the Temple as the expression of a new covenant, they were relatively unconcerned with the destruction of the Temple during the First Jewish–Roman War.

=== Council of Jamnia ===
Heinrich Graetz postulated a Council of Jamnia in 90 that excluded Christians from the synagogues, but this is disputed. Jewish Christians continued to worship in synagogues for centuries. As late as the 5th century, Patriarch John Chrysostom reprimanded Judaizers in his congregation who were still participating in Jewish festivals, taking part in other Jewish observances such as the shabbat, and making pilgrimage to Jewish holy places.

=== Bar Kokhba revolt ===
Simon bar Kokhba led the Jews of Judea in a revolt against the Roman Empire from 132 to 135 CE. The Romans, either as a cause of or in response to the uprising, initiated a persecution against Jewish religious observance. During this campaign, the Romans ignored the Christians, considering them to be separate from the Jews.

== See also ==
- Anti-Judaism
- Christianity and Judaism
- Christian–Jewish reconciliation
- Early Christianity
- Hellenistic Judaism
- History of Christianity
- History of early Christianity
- History of Judaism
- Jewish schisms
- Timeline of Christianity
- Timeline of Christian missions
- Timeline of the Roman Catholic Church
- Paul the Apostle and Judaism
- Flight to Pella

== Bibliography ==
- Ferda, Tucker S. (2025). "The Jerusalem oracle reconsidered (Mt. 23.37–39): the grammar of messianism and the future coming of Jesus". Journal for the Study of the New Testament. 47 (4): 526–548. doi:10.1177/0142064X251330929.
- Grayzel, Solomon (1968) [1947]. A History of the Jews (new revised ed.). New York: New American Library. ISBN 978-0-451-00426-0.
- Keown, Mark (2018). "An imminent Parousia and Christian mission: did the New Testament writers really expect Jesus' imminent return?". In Porter, Stanley E.; Pitts, Andrew W. (eds.). Christian Origins and the Establishment of the Early Jesus Movement. Texts and Editions for New Testament Study. Vol. 12. Boston: Brill. p. 242–263. ISBN 978-90-04-37269-6.
- Knohl, Israel (2000). The Messiah Before Jesus: The Suffering Servant of the Dead Sea Scrolls. Berkeley, CA: University of California Press. ISBN 0-520-21592-3.
- McGrath, Alister E. (2006) [1997]. Christianity: An Introduction (2nd ed.). Oxford: Blackwell. ISBN 978-1-4051-0901-7.
- Neusner, Jacob (1984). Torah From Our Sages: Pirke Avot. Dallas: Rossel. ISBN 0-940646-36-6.
- Novenson, Matthew V., ed. (2020). Monotheism and Christology in Greco-Roman Antiquity. Novum Testamentum, Supplements. Vol. 180. Boston: Brill. ISBN 978-90-04-43797-5.
- Sanders, E. P. (1985). Jesus and Judaism. Philadelphia: Fortress. ISBN 0-8006-2061-5.
- Schäfer, Peter (2012). The Jewish Jesus: How Judaism and Christianity Shaped Each Other. Princeton University Press. ISBN 978-0-691-15390-2.
- Wylen, Stephen M. (1996). The Jews in the Time of Jesus: An Introduction. Mahwah, NJ: Paulist. ISBN 978-0-8091-3610-0.
