= Jesus and Judaism =

1985 book by E. P. Sanders

- cover
- Author: E.P. Sanders
- Language: English
- Subject: The historical Jesus; sin, repentance and covenantal nomism in earliest Christianity; Split of Judaism and Christianity
- Genre: Non-fiction
- Publisher: Fortress Press
- Publication date: 1985
- Pages: 444
- ISBN: 978-0800620615

Jesus and Judaism is a 1985 book by E. P. Sanders, published by Fortress Press. The book sets out to examine Jesus' intention and his relationship to his Jewish contemporaries, based primarily on analysis of his actions rather than the sayings attributed to him. Sanders argues that Jesus is best understood within the framework of Jewish restoration eschatology, that his action in the Jerusalem Temple symbolically announced the Temple's destruction and eschatological replacement, and that he offered inclusion in the Kingdom to the wicked without demanding repentance in its conventionally understood form. The work extends the concept of "covenantal nomism" developed in Sanders' earlier book on Paul the Apostle, applying it to Jesus.

Upon publication, the book generated discussion and was recognized as among the most significant contributions to the study of the historical Jesus within Second Temple Judaism produced in its era. The book received the Grawemeyer Award for Religion in 1990.

== Description ==
=== Overview and method ===
Sanders states at the outset that his purpose is to investigate Jesus' intention and his relationship to contemporary Judaism, questions that necessarily involve the reason for this death and the forces behind the rise of Christianity. His goal is to produce a historically convincing account of Jesus that situates him firmly within Jewish history, accounts for his execution, and explains why his followers went on to form a persecuted messianic sect.

Sanders characterizes his own background as that of liberal, secularized Protestant shaped by a tradition of low Christology and the social gospel, and states that he has been working to free historical and exegetical inquiry from theologically predetermined conclusions. He proposes to build his analysis on what Jesus did rather than on dominical sayings, though he acknowledges that the simplicity of this program is complicated, inevitably, by the need to engage in exegetical questions about particular sayings. He identifies himself as belonging to a scholarly school that considers it rarely possible to prove any saying attributed to Jesus entirely authentic or entirely secondary, and he therefore approaches the sayings tradition with caution. He describes his study as resting primarily on facts about Jesus and only secondarily on selected sayings.

=== The Temple ===
Drawing on the contributions of Ben F. Meyer, Sanders examines Jesus' action in the precincts of the Jerusalem Temple and concludes that Jesus intended to announce the Temple's destruction and its replacement by a new, eschatologically perfect Temple. He describes the nature of what Jesus did in the Temple as exceeding a mere attempt at reform, describing it instead as a "symbolic demonstration". He argues that the Temple saying and the Temple action should be interpreted together, both pointing toward eschatological expectation rather than toward concerns about cultic purity. In his view, Jesus' prediction of the old Temple's end and the coming of a new one violated the normative consensus among his Jewish contemporaries and contributed to the chain of events leading to his execution. Additionally, he acknowledges that he considers the symbolism of overturning tables as a sign of destruction to be self-evident, but he does not develop a sustained defense of this interpretation, stating that he must leave to others the assessment of this symbolism.

=== Kingdom of God ===
Sanders places special importance on sayings that equate the Kingdom with a social order. The sayings he identifies as portraying the Kingdom as involving a "recognizable social order" include Matt 19:28, Matt 20:20–28, Matt 16:18–19, and Mark 14:25. In his opinion, the core of Jesus' expectation was a radical supernatural event. He portrays Jesus as anticipating divine intervention in history, the defeat of evil, the construction of a renewed Temple, and the restoration of Israel with himself and his followers playing a central role. Sanders situates this expectation within the normal framework of Jewish restoration eschatology, whose main themes included the future redemption and restoration of Israel, a new or renewed temple, national repentance, eschatological judgement, and the admission of Gentiles.

Sanders stresses that Jesus and his followers were not unusual in anticipating a new age, in expecting it to arrive without armed revolt, or in extending its promise particularly to the marginalized. He draws comparisons with other eschatological figures mentioned by Josephus, such as Theudas and "The Egyptian", suggesting that these figures (both active in Judea during the first century AD) too likely believed that God was acting through them and would establish his Kingdom by means of them.

=== The Sinners ===
The book contains a chapter dealing with the Gospel sinners, which builds on Sanders' 1983 article published in the Journal for the Study of the New Testament. Sanders challenges the influential identification, established by Joachim Jeremias, of the Gospel sinners with the common people or ʿamme ha-ʾareṣ. He contends that the term cannot be confined to infractions of purity, and proposes instead that the sinners should be understood as the rešaim, or "the wicked", people who willfully abandoned the Torah and placed themselves outside the covenant. He further argues that the ʿamme ha-ʾareṣ were not considered excluded from salvation, and were integrated into the religious life of Judaism.

On this basis, Sanders explains that if Jesus had merely led tax collectors to repent, make restitution, and leave their profession, he would have been celebrated rather than opposed, since no one would have objected to genuine conversion of notorious wrongdoers. The real source of offense, Sanders argues, was that Jesus offered sinners a place in the Kingdom without insisting on repentance in its conventionally understood form, without requiring restitution, sacrifice, or submission to the Law as traditionally demanded. Sanders' formulation is that Jesus extended fellowship to the wicked as a sign that God would save them, without conditioning this association on the return to legal obedience.

=== Repentance ===
Sanders argues that Jesus did not make national repentance a central element of his proclamation. He contends that the evidence of passages in which Jesus refers to repentance is relatively slight and may reflect later Christian interpretation. He concedes that parables such as the parable of the Lost Sheep deal with repentance, but characterizes this as apparently individual rather than communal in scope. Sanders proposes that Jesus regarded John the Baptist as having already carried out the task of summoning the nation to repentance, which is why Jesus himself did not make it a priority.

Sanders concludes that Jesus' eschatological focus meant he did not address his hearers' behavior in detail, and that he could therefore legitimately be criticized for including the wicked in his Kingdom. Nevertheless, he does qualify his position in the book's later pages, moving to a more moderate claim that Jesus simply did not emphasize it. Sanders also acknowledges that he cannot fully explain what Jesus expected people to do after associating with him, describing this as a puzzle within his reconstruction.

=== Jesus and the Law ===
Sanders devotes another section to Jesus' relationship to the Torah. He argues that the synoptic tradition contains no firm evidence that would support the claim that Jesus opposed or rejected the Law. The few dominical sayings that might initially seem to point in that direction (including his saying on divorce, the prediction of the Temple's destruction, and the call to let the dead bury the dead), are taken by Sanders as evidence not that the Law could be freely transgressed but rather that Jesus viewed the current Mosaic dispensation as not final. Sanders maintains that while the Law remained authoritative in the present, the new age was at hand, and this eschatological perspective produced a certain ambiguity in Jesus' attitude toward Moses.

=== Covenantal Nomism ===
Near the end of the book, the concept of covenantal nomism appears for the first time: the view that one's standing before God is established through the covenant, which requires obedience to its commandments while providing means of atonement for transgression. Sanders explains that this is partly because he does not use the concept as a foundation for his reconstruction, and partly because Jesus did not directly discuss the covenant in historical terms or debate the fine points of obedience to the Law, but rather focused on preparing his followers for the coming redemption. Sanders concludes that Jesus accepted the covenantal nomism of his day, reasoning that since his mission was directed to Israel in the name of Israel's God, he evidently accepted his people's special status, their election, and the covenant.

At the book's conclusion, Sanders organizes his findings into six tiers of confidence.

== Reception ==
=== Reviews ===
Scholar of religion Bruce Chilton, in a review published in the Journal of Biblical Literature, praised Sanders' ambition but noted that the book's program is inevitably "diluted" by the need to engage with sayings nonetheless, despite Sanders' aim to analyze the historical Jesus on the basis of what he did rather than what he said. He also challenged Sanders' reading of the Temple action as a "symbolic demonstration" of destruction, noting Sanders retreats from defending his own interpretation at a key moment. He found Sanders' claim that Jesus offered the kingdom without requiring repentance as "magnificently controversial" but insufficiently substantiated. He also criticized Sanders for not considering the Aramaic term hayybin, "debtors", as an antecedent of "sinners" in the Gospels, which would undermine the equation of "sinners" with the technically rešaim, "wicked". He concluded that Sanders is a "brilliant interlocutor" whose interpretations demand attention even when they do not command assent.

David Flusser, a scholar of Second Temple Judaism and early Christianity, wrote in The Jewish Quarterly Review that the book underestimates Jesus' ethical teaching and personal distinctiveness by portraying him primarily as an eschatological visionary. He questioned whether Jesus' eschatological timetable was really as short as Sanders assumes, noting Gospel sayings about the unpredictability of the end. He also draws an analogy with Socrates: reconstructing a historical figure primarily from "facts" about him and his supposed guilt, while neglecting his teaching, is a dangerous methodology. Despite these reservations, Flusser praised the book as "one of the most important works about Jesus and Judaism written in our time", and for illuminating Jesus as a "prophet of Jewish restoration eschatology".

Historian and theologian Dale C. Allison, in a review published in the Journal for the Study of the New Testament, writes that Sanders is wrong to claim Jesus accepted covenantal nomism. He argues that John the Baptist's saying about God raising children from stones (Matt 3:9, Luke 3:8) challenges the idea that birth into Israel guarantees covenant membership. He proposes that Jesus, emerging from the Baptist movement, shared this rejection and served as the connecting link between John and Paul on this issue. Allison contends that restoration eschatology does not require acceptance of covenantal nomism, pointing to the Jewish sect of the Essenes, Paul, and early Christians as example. He also challenges Sanders' claim that Jesus did not emphasize repentance, arguing that the synoptic evidence for it is sufficient and that the apparent paucity of repentance material is explained by the disciples' preaching mission continuing John's work. Furthermore, Allison argues that what offended people was Jesus' exclusivity, making salvation hinge on acceptance of his own person, rather than his inclusivity towards sinners.

=== Accolades ===
In 1990, the book received the Grawemeyer Award for Religion, jointly awarded by the University of Louisville and Louisville Presbyterian Theological Seminary. The award citation described Sanders's argument that "Jesus was very much inside one of the major streams of Jewish thought of his day, and he is not to be understood in opposition to Judaism," and praised his treatment of Jesus within "the general framework of Jewish hopes for restoration," presenting the work as an important contribution to understanding the historical Jesus and the origins of Christianity in its first-century Jewish context.

== See also ==
- Christianity and Judaism
- Paul the Apostle and Jewish Christianity
- When Christians Were Jews: The First Generation

== Bibliography ==
- Sanders, E. P. (1985). Jesus and Judaism. Philadelphia: Fortress Press.

=== Reviews ===
- Allison, Dale C., Jr. (1987). "Jesus and the Covenant: A Response to E. P. Sanders". Journal for the Study of the New Testament. 9 (29): 57–78. doi:10.1177/0142064X8700902903.
- Chilton, Bruce (1987). "Review of Jesus and Judaism by E. P. Sanders". Journal of Biblical Literature. 106 (3). Society of Biblical Literature: 537–539. doi:10.2307/3261087. JSTOR 3261087.
- Chilton, Bruce (1988). "Jesus and the Repentance of E. P. Sanders". Tyndale Bulletin. 39 (1): 1–18.
- Flusser, David (1986). "Review of Jesus and Judaism by E. P. Sanders". The Jewish Quarterly Review. New Series. 76 (3). University of Pennsylvania Press: 246–252. doi:10.2307/1454511. JSTOR 1454511.
