= Paul the Apostle and Jewish Christianity =

Academic reappraisal since the 1970s

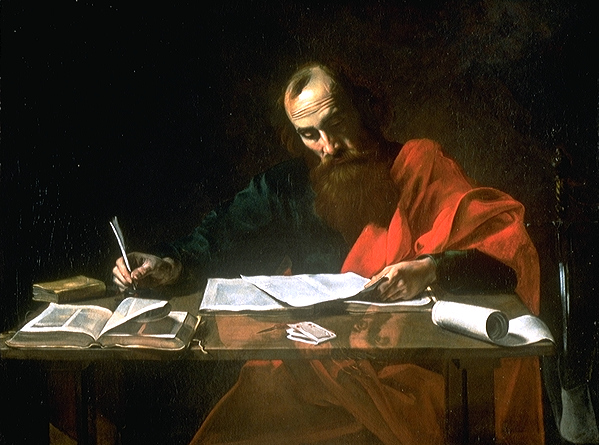
Valentin de Boulogne: Saint Paul Writing His Epistles (c. 1618–1620), Museum of Fine Arts, Houston, Texas. Nowadays, biblical scholars believe that the Apostle Paul actually dictated his letters to a secretary (e.g., Romans 16:22).

Since the 1970s, scholars have sought to place Paul the Apostle within his historical context in Second Temple Judaism. Paul's relationship to Judaism involves topics including the status of Israel's covenant with God and the role of works as a means to either gain or keep the covenant.

The inclusion of Gentiles into the early Christian movement provoked a controversy between Paul and other Apostles over whether the gentiles' faith in Christ exempted them from circumcision. Paul did not deem circumcision necessary for gentiles, because he thought that God included them into the New Covenant through faith in Christ. This brought him into conflict with the Judaizers, a faction of the Jewish Christians who believed Mosaic Law did require circumcision for Gentile converts. Eventually, adherents of Paul's view became more numerous, and this among other related developments led to the creation of Christianity as distinct from Judaism.

== Overview ==
In Paul's thinking, instead of humanity divided as "Israel and the nations" which is the classic understanding of Judaism, we have "Israel after the flesh" (i.e., the Jewish people), non-Jews whom he calls "the nations," (i.e., Gentiles) and a new people called "the church of God" made of all those whom he designates as "in Christ" (1 Corinthians 10:32).

— James Tabor, Huffington Post

Paul's influence on Christian thinking is considered to be more significant than that of any other New Testament author. According to Krister Stendahl, the main concern of Paul's writings on Jesus' role, and salvation by faith, is not the individual conscience of human sinners, and their doubts about being chosen by God or not, but the problem of the inclusion of Gentile (Greek) Torah-observers into God's covenant. (Note: (Note: Stephen Westerholm (2015), The New Perspective on Paul in Review, Direction, Spring 2015, Vol. 44 (No. 1), pp. 4–15.) (Note: Dunn quotes Stendahl: "Cf Stendahl, Paul among Jews and Gentiles, passim-e.g "... a doctrine of faith was hammered out by Paul for the very specific and limited purpose of defending the rights of Gentile converts to be full and genuine heirs to the promise of God to Israel"(p.2)" Stephen Westerholm: "For Paul, the question that "justification by faith" was intended to answer was, "On what terms can Gentiles gain entrance to the people of God?" Bent on denying any suggestion that Gentiles must become Jews and keep the Jewish law, he answered, "By faith—and not by works of the (Jewish) law"." Westerholm refers to: Krister Stendahl, The Apostle Paul and the Introspective Conscience of the West, Harvard Theological Review 56 (1963), 199–215; reprinted in Stendahl, Paul Among Jews and Gentiles and Other Essays (Philadelphia: Fortress, 1976), 78–96. Westerholm quotes Sanders: "Sanders noted that "the salvation of the Gentiles is essential to Paul's preaching; and with it falls the law; for, as Paul says simply, Gentiles cannot live by the law (Gal. 2.14)" (496). On a similar note, Sanders suggested that the only Jewish "boasting" to which Paul objected was that which exulted over the divine privileges granted to Israel and failed to acknowledge that God, in Christ, had opened the door of salvation to Gentiles."))

Paul draws on several interpretative frames to solve this problem, but most importantly, his own experience and understanding. The kerygma from 1 Corinthians 15:3–5 refers to two mythologies: the Greek myth of the noble dead, to which the Maccabean notion of martyrdom and dying for one's people is related; and the Jewish myth of the persecuted sage or righteous man, the "story of the child of wisdom." The notion of 'dying for' refers to this Christian martyrdom and the persecution of Christians in the Roman Empire. (Note: According to the Jewish Encyclopedia (1906), "The Mishnah says that sins are expiated (1) by sacrifice, (2) by repentance at death or on Yom Kippur, (3) in the case of the lighter transgressions of the positive or negative precepts, by repentance at any time [...] The graver sins, according to Rabbi, are apostasy, heretical interpretation of the Torah, and non-circumcision (Yoma 86a). The atonement for sins between a man and his neighbor is an ample apology (Yoma 85b)." (Note: Jewish Encyclopedia, SIN) The Jewish Encyclopedia further writes: "Most efficacious seemed to be the atoning power of suffering experienced by the righteous during the Exile. This is the idea underlying the description of the suffering servant of God in Isa. liii. 4, 12, Hebr. [...] of greater atoning power than all the Temple sacrifices was the suffering of the elect ones who were to be servants and witnesses of the Lord (Isa. xlii. 1–4, xlix. 1–7, l. 6). This idea of the atoning power of the suffering and death of the righteous finds expression also in IV Macc. vi. 27, xvii. 21–23; M. Ḳ. 28a; Pesiḳ. xxvii. 174b; Lev. R. xx.; and formed the basis of Paul's doctrine of the atoning blood of Christ (Rom. iii. 25)." (Note: Jewish Encyclopedia (1906), "Atonement")) 'Dying for our sins' refers to the problem of Gentile observers of the Torah who, though faithful, are not Jewish by birth and are therefore 'sinners' and excluded from God's covenant. Jesus' death and resurrection solved this problem of the exclusion of the Gentiles from God's covenant, as indicated by Romans 3:21–26.

The inclusion of Gentiles into Judaism posed a problem for the Jewish-Christian identity of some of the proto-Christians, since the new converts did not follow all the tenets of the Mosaic Law; circumcision in particular was regarded as a token of the membership of the Abrahamic covenant, and the most traditionalist faction of Jewish Christians (i.e., converted Pharisees) insisted that Gentile converts had to be circumcised as well. Paul objected strongly to the insistence on keeping all of the Jewish commandments, considering it a great threat to his doctrine of salvation through faith in Jesus. According to Paula Fredriksen, Paul's opposition to male circumcision for Gentiles is in line with the Old Testament predictions that "in the last days the gentile nations would come to the God of Israel, as gentiles (e.g., Zechariah 8:20–23), not as proselytes to Israel." (Note: Larry Hurtado (December 4, 2018), "When Christians were Jews": Paula Fredriksen on "The First Generation") For Paul, Gentile male circumcision was therefore an affront to God's intentions. According to Larry Hurtado, "Paul saw himself as what Munck called a salvation-historical figure in his own right", who was "personally and singularly deputized by God to bring about the predicted ingathering (the "fullness") of the nations (Romans 11:25)."

For Paul, the sacrifice of Jesus solved the problem of the exclusion of Gentiles from God's covenant, since the faithful are redeemed by participation in Jesus' death and rising. According to Galatians 2:1–10 and Acts chapter 15, Paul discussed the issue with the leaders of the Jerusalem ekklēsia, agreeing to allow Gentile converts exemption from most Jewish commandments, which opened the way for a much larger Christian Church, extending far beyond the Jewish community. Hurtado notes that Paul valued the linkage with "Jewish Christian circles in Roman Judea", which makes it likely that his Christology was in line with, and indebted to, their views. Hurtado further notes that "[i]t is widely accepted that the tradition that Paul recites in 1 Corinthians 15:1–17 must go back to the Jerusalem Church."

=== New Perspective on Paul ===
E. P. Sanders introduced a new perspective on Paul with his 1977 publication Paul and Palestinian Judaism. According to Sanders, Western theology has misunderstood the Judaic context of Paul's religious views. Law-keeping and good works were not means to enter the covenant (legalism), but a sign of being in, and a means of keeping, the covenant. Sanders called this pattern of religion "covenantal nomism". Sanders' perspective calls the traditional Protestant understanding of the doctrine of justification into serious question.

Sanders' publications, such as Paul and Palestinian Judaism in 1977 and Paul, the Law, and the Jewish People in 1983, have since been taken up by Professor James D. G. Dunn, who coined the phrase "New Perspective on Paul"; and by N. T. Wright, then Anglican bishop of Durham. Wright notes the apparent discrepancy between the Epistle to the Romans and the Epistle to the Galatians, with Romans being much more positive about the continuing covenantal relationship between God and his ancient people than is Galatians. Wright contends therefore that works are not insignificant. According to Wright, Paul distinguishes between works which are signs of ethnic identity, and those which are a sign of obedience to Christ.

Within the last three decades, a number of theologians have put forward other "New Perspectives" on Paul's doctrine of justification, and even more specifically on what he says about justification by faith. According to Simon Gathercole, "Justification by faith" means God accepts Gentiles in addition to Jews, since both believe in God. Paul writes in his letter to the Romans, "For we maintain that a man is justified by faith apart from observing the law. Is God the God of Jews only? Is he not the God of Gentiles too? Yes, of Gentiles too, since there is only one God, who will justify the circumcised by faith and the uncircumcised through that same faith". Faith is the central component of Paul's doctrine of justification—meaning that Gentiles don't need to become Israelites when they convert to Christianity, because God is not just the God of one nation, but Gentile and Jew alike.

== Sources ==
The Book of Acts contains an account of Paul's travels and deeds, his conflicts with Greeks and Jews during the Julio-Claudian dynasty, and his interactions with the original Apostles of Jesus. The value of the historical information in Acts, however, is challenged by some scholars. They believe that it was written from a perspective of reconciliation between Pauline Christianity and its opponents, so portrays Paul as a Law-abiding Jew and omits his dispute with Peter, only briefly mentioning the split with Barnabas. Irenaeus in the 2nd century was the first of record to quote Acts, and he used it against Marcion of Sinope, who rejected the Hebrew Bible entirely (see also Marcionism).

== Paul's background ==
=== Jewish background ===
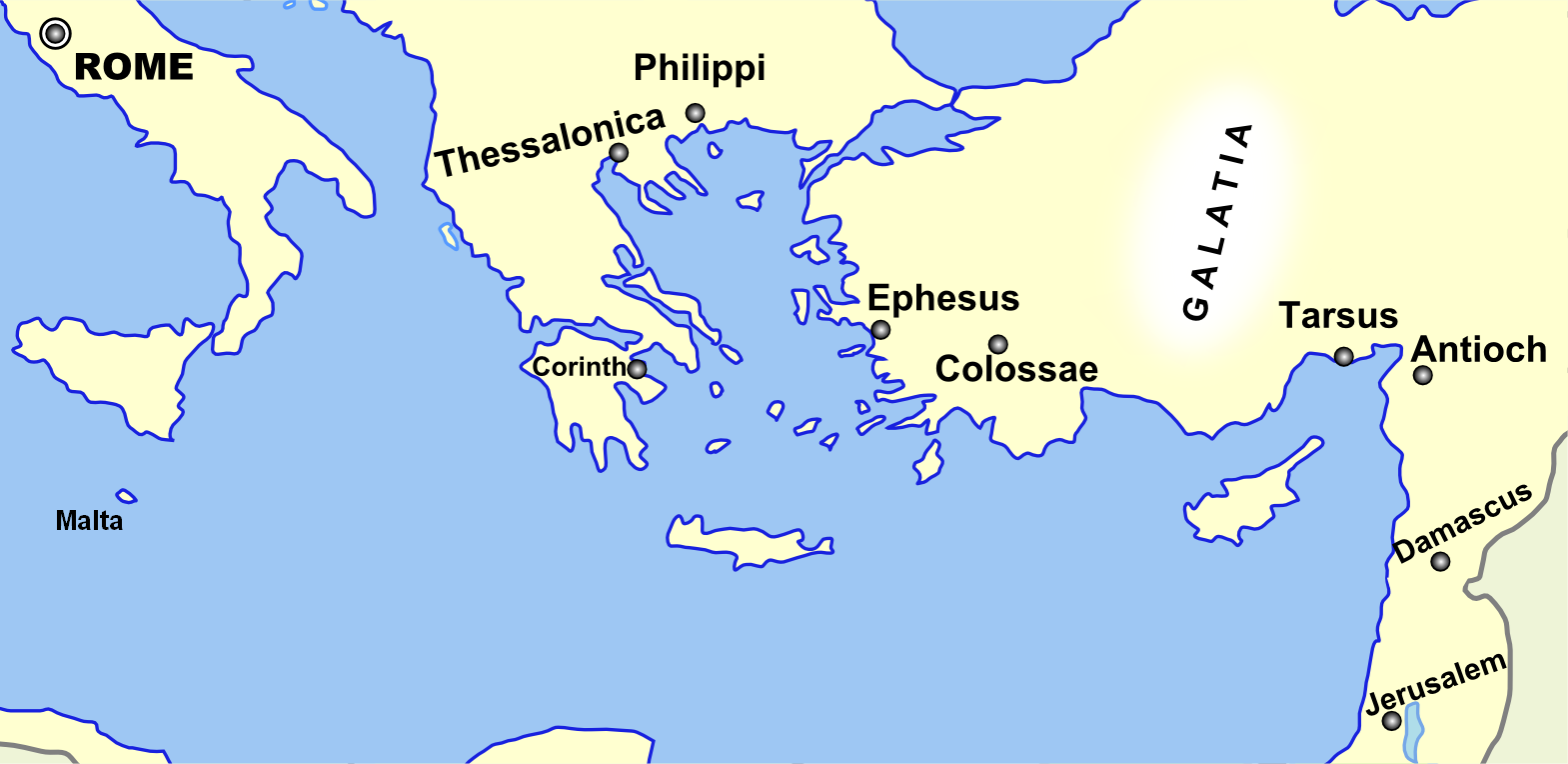
Mediterranean Basin geography relevant to Paul's life in the first century, stretching from Jerusalem in the lower-right to Rome in the upper-left.

Paul was from a devout Jewish family based in the city of Tarsus, one of the largest trade centers on the Mediterranean coast. It had been in existence several hundred years prior to his birth. It was renowned for its university. During the time of Alexander the Great, who died in 323 BC, Tarsus was the most influential city in Asia Minor.

Paul's family had a history of religious piety (2 Timothy 1:3). Apparently the family lineage had been very attached to Pharisaic traditions and observances for generations; Acts quotes Paul referring to his family by saying he was "a Pharisee, born of Pharisees". In Romans 16:7 he states that two of his relatives, Andronicus and Junia, were Christians before he was and were prominent among the Apostles. Acts says that he was an artisan involved in the leather or tent-making profession. This was to become an initial connection with Priscilla and Aquila, with whom he would partner in tent-making and later become very important teammates as fellow missionaries. Paul referred to himself as an observant Jew in the letter to the Philippians:

If anyone else has reason to be confident in the flesh, I have more: circumcised on the eighth day, a member of the people of Israel, of the tribe of Benjamin, a Hebrew born of Hebrews; as to the law, a Pharisee; as to zeal, a persecutor of the church; as to righteousness under the law, blameless.

— Philippians 3:4–6

While he was still fairly young, he was sent to Jerusalem to receive rabbinical education at the school of Gamaliel, one of the most noted rabbis in history. Some of his family may have resided in Jerusalem, since later the son of one of his sisters saved his life there. Nothing more is known of his biography until he takes an active part in the martyrdom of Stephen, a Hellenised diaspora Jew.

Although we know from his biography and from Acts that Paul could speak Hebrew, modern scholarship suggests that Koine Greek was his first language. In his letters, Paul drew heavily on his knowledge of Stoic philosophy, using Stoic terms and metaphors to assist his new Gentile converts in their understanding of the Gospel and to explain his Christology.

=== Greek background ===
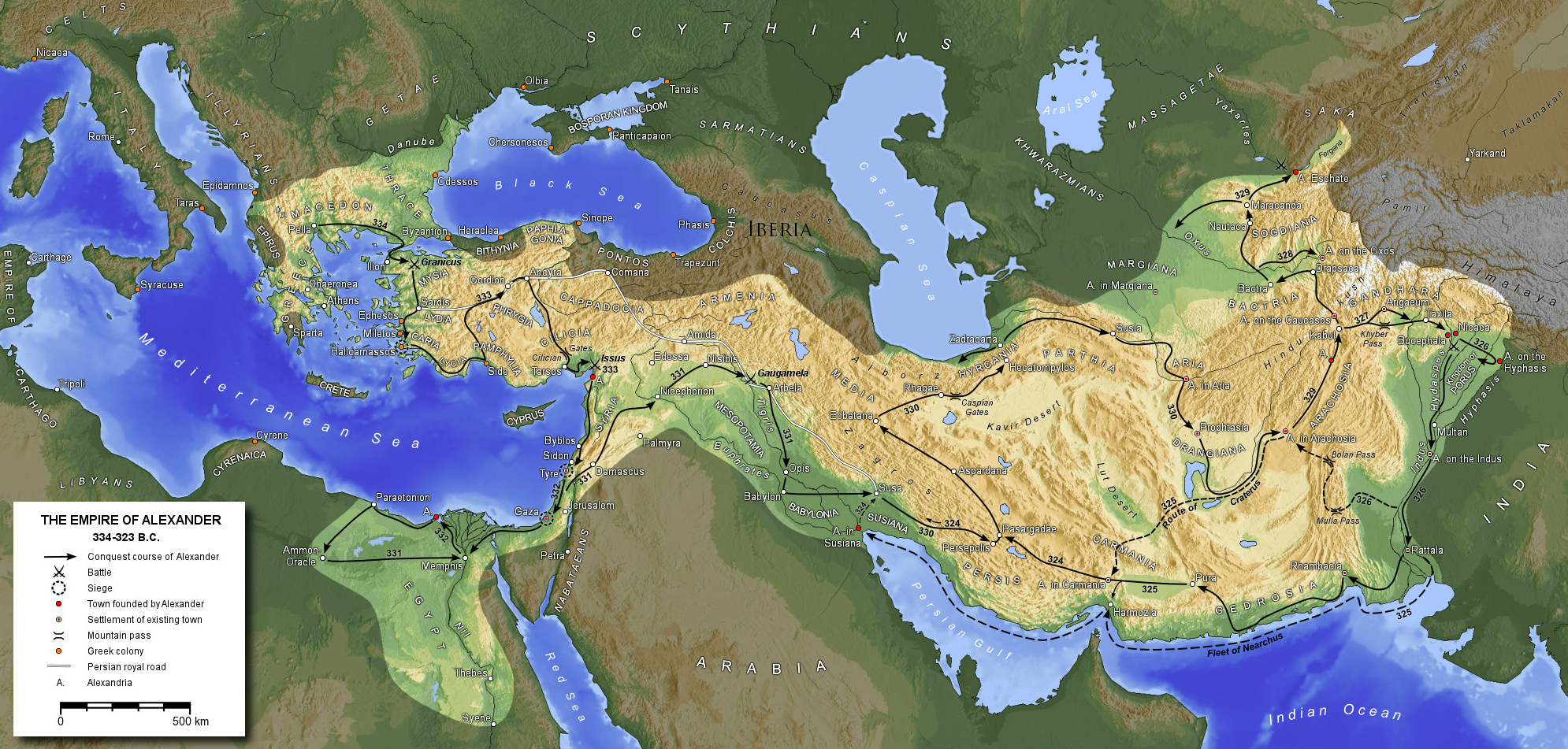
Map of Alexander's empire, c. 334–323 BC, stretching east and south of Macedonia.

Hellenistic Judaism was a movement which existed in the Jewish diaspora and the Holy Land that sought to establish a Hebraic-Jewish religious tradition within the culture and language of Hellenism. The major literary product of the contact of Judaism and Hellenistic culture is the Septuagint (begun in the 3rd century BC). Major authors are Philo of Alexandria (died c. 50 AD), Josephus (died c.100 AD), and some would claim also Paul. The decline of Hellenistic Judaism in the 2nd century AD is obscure. It may be that it was marginalized by, absorbed into, or became Early Christianity.

Recently, Talmudic scholar Daniel Boyarin has argued that Paul's theology of the spirit is more deeply rooted in Hellenistic Judaism than generally believed. In A Radical Jew, Boyarin argues that Paul the Apostle combined the life of Jesus with Greek philosophy to reinterpret the Hebrew Bible in terms of the Platonic opposition between the ideal (which is real) and the material (which is false).

== Gentiles and circumcision ==
Before Paul's conversion, Christianity was part of Second Temple Judaism. Gentiles who wished to join the early Christian movement, which at the time comprised mostly Jewish followers, were expected to convert to Judaism, which likely meant submission to adult male circumcision for the uncircumcised, following the dietary restrictions of kashrut, and more. During the time period there were also "partial converts", such as gate proselytes and God-fearers, i.e. Greco-Roman sympathizers which made an allegiance to Judaism but refused to convert and therefore retained their Gentile (non-Jewish) status, hence they were uncircumcised and it wasn't required for them to follow any of the commandments of the Mosaic Law. Paul insisted that faith in Christ (see also Faith or Faithfulness) was sufficient for salvation, therefore the Mosaic Law wasn't binding for the Gentiles.

=== Paul's conversion ===
The Epistle to the Galatians says that, prior to his conversion, Paul was a Pharisee who "violently persecuted" the followers of Jesus.

You have heard, no doubt, of my earlier life in Judaism. I was violently persecuting the church of God and was trying to destroy it. I advanced in Judaism beyond many among my people of the same age, for I was far more zealous for the traditions of my ancestors.

— Galatians 1:13–14

=== Pillars of the Church ===
Galatians 1:15–17 says that after God "called me ... so that I might proclaim him among the Gentiles", he "did not confer with any human being". When he was in Jerusalem three years later he met Cephas (Peter) and James the Lord's brother and Galatians 2:1–2 says he did not explain "the gospel that I proclaim among the Gentiles" to "the acknowledged leaders" until 14 years later in a subsequent trip to Jerusalem.

=== Proselytizing among Jews ===
According to Acts, Paul began working along the traditional Jewish line of proselytizing in the various synagogues where the proselytes of the gate and the Jews met; and only because he failed to win the Jews to his views, encountering strong opposition and persecution from them, did he turn to the Gentile world after he had agreed at a convention with the apostles at Jerusalem to admit the Gentiles into the Church only as proselytes of the gate, that is, after their acceptance of the Noachian laws.

In Galatians 1:17–18, Paul declares that, immediately after his conversion, he went away into Arabia, and again returned to Damascus. "Then after three years, I went up to Jerusalem to visit Cephas". In Acts, no mention is made of Paul's journey into Arabia; and the journey to Jerusalem is placed immediately after the notice of Paul's preaching in the synagogues. Hilgenfeld, Wendt, Weizäcker, Weiss, and others allege here a contradiction between the writer of the Acts and Paul.

Rabbi Jacob Emden, in a remarkable apology for Christianity contained in his appendix to Seder Olam Rabbah, gives as his opinion that the original intention of Jesus, and especially of Paul, was to convert only the Gentiles to the seven moral laws of Noah and to let the Jews follow the Mosaic law, which explains the apparent contradictions in the New Testament regarding the laws of Moses and the Sabbath.

=== Persecution of Paul by Jews in Acts ===
Several passages in Acts describe Paul's missions to Asia Minor and the encounters he had with Diaspora Jews and with local gentile populations. In Acts 13–15, the Jews from Antioch and Iconium go so far as to follow Paul to other cities and to incite the crowds there to violence against him. Paul had already been stoned and left for dead once. In Philippi, a Roman colony, Roman magistrates beat and jailed Paul and his companions on behalf of the Gentiles. Clearly at this point, Paul and his companions were still considered to be Jews by those in Philippi who raised protests against them, despite Paul's attempts to tailor his teachings to his audience. Later, in nearby Thessalonica, the Jews again incited the crowds and pitted the Christians against the Roman authority.

=== Circumcision controversy ===
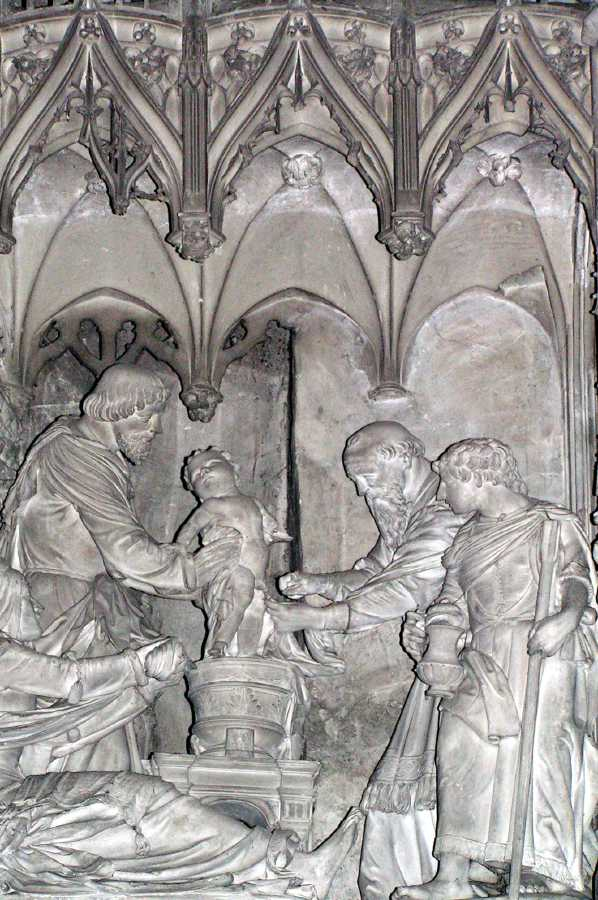
Circumcision of Christ, sculpture in the Cathedral of Chartres.

Paul, who called himself "Apostle to the Gentiles," criticised the practice of circumcision, perhaps as an entrance into the New Covenant of Jesus. In the case of Timothy, whose mother was a Jewish Christian but whose father was a Greek, Paul personally circumcised him "because of the Jews" that were in town. Some believe that he appeared to praise its value in Romans 3:1–2, yet later in Romans 2 we see his point. In 1 Corinthians 9:20–23 he also disputes the value of circumcision.

Paul made his case to the Christians at Rome that circumcision no longer meant the physical, but a spiritual practice. And in that sense, he wrote: "Is any man called being circumcised? Let him not become uncircumcised" in 1 Corinthians 7:18—probably a reference to the practice of epispasm. Paul was already circumcised at the time of his conversion. He added: "Is any called in uncircumcision? Let him not be circumcised", and went on to argue that circumcision didn't matter: "Circumcision is nothing and uncircumcision is nothing. Keeping God's commands is what counts."

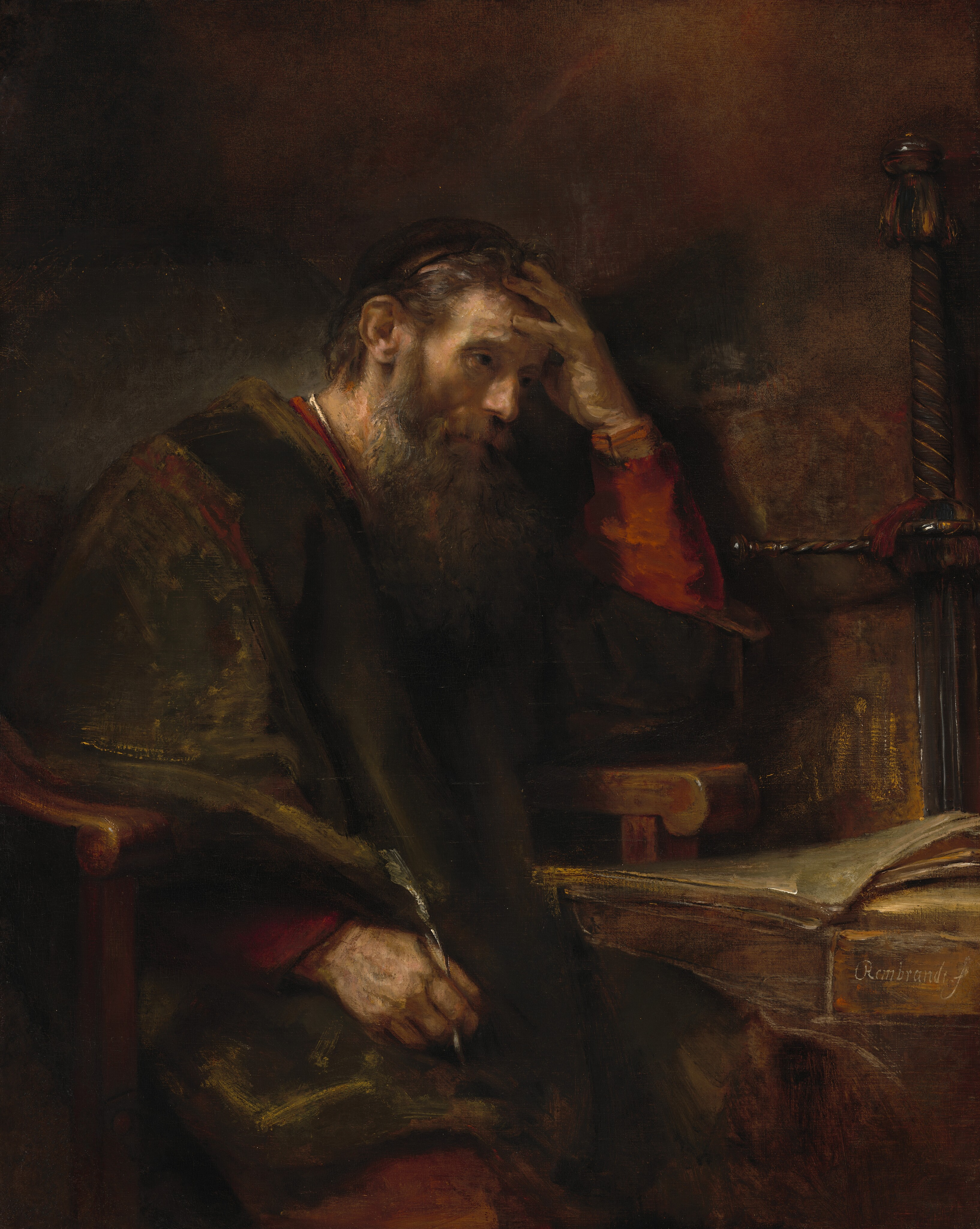
Rembrandt: The Apostle Paul, circa 1657 (National Gallery of Art, Washington, D.C.)

Later Paul more explicitly denounced the practice, rejecting and condemning those Judaizers who promoted circumcision to Gentile Christians. He accused them of turning from the Spirit to the flesh: "Are you so foolish, that, whereas you began in the Spirit, you would now be made perfect by the flesh?" Paul warned that the advocates of circumcision were "false brothers". He accused the advocates of circumcision of wanting to make a good showing in the flesh, and of glorying or boasting of the flesh. Paul instead stressed a message of salvation through faith in Christ opposed to the submission under the Mosaic Law that constituted a New Covenant with God, which essentially provides a justification for Gentiles from the harsh edicts of the Law, a New Covenant that didn't require circumcision (see also Justification by faith, Pauline passages supporting antinomianism, Abrogation of Old Covenant laws).

His attitude towards circumcision varies between his outright hostility to what he calls "mutilation" in Philippians 3:2–3 to praise in Romans 3:1–2. However, such apparent discrepancies have led to a degree of skepticism about the reliability of Acts. Baur, Schwanbeck, De Wette, Davidson, Mayerhoff, Schleiermacher, Bleek, Krenkel, and others have opposed the authenticity of the Acts; an objection is drawn from the discrepancy between Acts 9:19–28 and Gal. 1:17–19. Some believe that Paul wrote the entire Epistle to the Galatians attacking circumcision, saying in chapter five: "Behold, I Paul say unto you, if ye be circumcised, Christ shall profit you nothing."

The division between the Jews who followed the Mosaic Law and were circumcised and the Gentiles who were uncircumcised was highlighted in his Epistle to the Galatians:

On the contrary, when they saw that I had been entrusted with the gospel for the uncircumcised, just as Peter had been entrusted with the gospel for the circumcised (for he who worked through Peter making him an apostle to the circumcised also worked through me in sending me to the Gentiles), and when James and Cephas and John, who were acknowledged pillars, recognized the grace that had been given to me, they gave to Barnabas and me the right hand of fellowship, agreeing that we should go to the Gentiles and they to the circumcised.

— Galatians 2:7–9

=== Views on Judaizers ===
The Judaizers were a faction of the Jewish Christians, both of Jewish and non-Jewish origins, who regarded the Levitical laws of the Old Testament as still binding on all Christians. They tried to enforce Jewish circumcision upon the Gentile converts to early Christianity and were strenuously opposed and criticized for their behavior by the Apostle Paul, which employed many of his epistles to refute their doctrinal errors.

Paul was severely critical of the Judaizers within the Early Church and harshly reprimanded them for their doctrines and behavior. This conflict between Paul and his opponents may have been the reason for the Council of Jerusalem. Here James, Paul, and the other leaders of the Early Christian movement agreed that Gentile converts needed only to follow the "three exceptions", (counted by some as four) laws that roughly coincide with Judaism's Seven Laws of Noah said to be established by God for all humankind. This Apostolic Decree, still observed by the Eastern Orthodox Church, is similar to that adopted by Rabbinic Judaism, which teaches that Gentiles need only follow the Noachide Laws to be assured of a place in the World to Come (see also Noahidism and Dual-covenant theology).

=== Council of Jerusalem ===
Paul seems to have refused "to be tied down to particular patterns of behavior and practice." 1 Cor. 9:20–23 He does not engage in a dispute with those Corinthians who apparently feel quite free to eat anything offered to idols, never appealing or even mentioning the Jerusalem council. He rather attempts to persuade them by appealing to the care they should have for other believers who might not feel so free.

Paul himself described several meetings with the apostles in Jerusalem, though it is difficult to reconcile any of them fully with the account in Acts (see also Paul the Apostle#Council of Jerusalem). Paul claims he "went up again to Jerusalem" (i.e., not the first time) with Barnabas and Titus "in response to a revelation", in order to "lay before them the gospel proclaimed among the Gentiles",Gal. 2:2 them being according to Paul "those who were supposed to be acknowledged leaders":Gal. 2:6 James, Cephas and John. He describes this as a "private meeting" (not a public council) and notes that Titus, who was Greek, wasn't pressured to be circumcised.Gal. 2:3 However, he refers to "false believers secretly brought in, who slipped in to spy on the freedom we have in Christ Jesus, so that they might enslave us."Gal. 2:4

Paul claims the "pillars" of the Church had no differences with him. On the contrary, they gave him the "right hand of fellowship", he bound for the mission to "the uncircumcised" and they to "the circumcised", requesting only that he remember the "poor". Whether this was the same meeting as that described in Acts is not universally agreed.

According to an article in the Jewish Encyclopedia, great as was the success of Barnabas and Paul in the heathen world, the authorities in Jerusalem insisted upon circumcision as the condition of admission of members into the church, until, on the initiative of Peter, and of James, the head of the Jerusalem church, it was agreed that acceptance of the Noachian Laws—namely, regarding avoidance of idolatry, fornication, and the eating of flesh cut from a living animal—should be demanded of the heathen desirous of entering the Church.

Since F.C. Baur, scholars have found evidence of various strands of thought within Early Christianity. James D. G. Dunn proposes that Peter was a "bridge-man" between the opposing views of Paul and James the Just.

For Peter was probably in fact and effect the bridge-man (pontifex maximus!) who did more than any other to hold together the diversity of first-century Christianity. James the brother of Jesus and Paul, the two other most prominent leading figures in first-century Christianity, were too much identified with their respective "brands" of Christianity, at least in the eyes of Christians at the opposite ends of this particular spectrum. But Peter, as shown particularly by the Antioch episode in Gal 2, had both a care to hold firm to his Jewish heritage, which Paul lacked, and an openness to the demands of developing Christianity, which James lacked. John might have served as such a figure of the center holding together the extremes, but if the writings linked with his name are at all indicative of his own stance he was too much of an individualist to provide such a rallying point. Others could link the developing new religion more firmly to its founding events and to Jesus himself. But none of them, including the rest of the twelve, seem to have played any role of continuing significance for the whole sweep of Christianity—though James the brother of John might have proved an exception had he been spared." [Italics original]

— James D. G. Dunn. "The Canon Debate," McDonald & Sanders editors, 2002, chapter 32, p. 577

=== Incident at Antioch ===
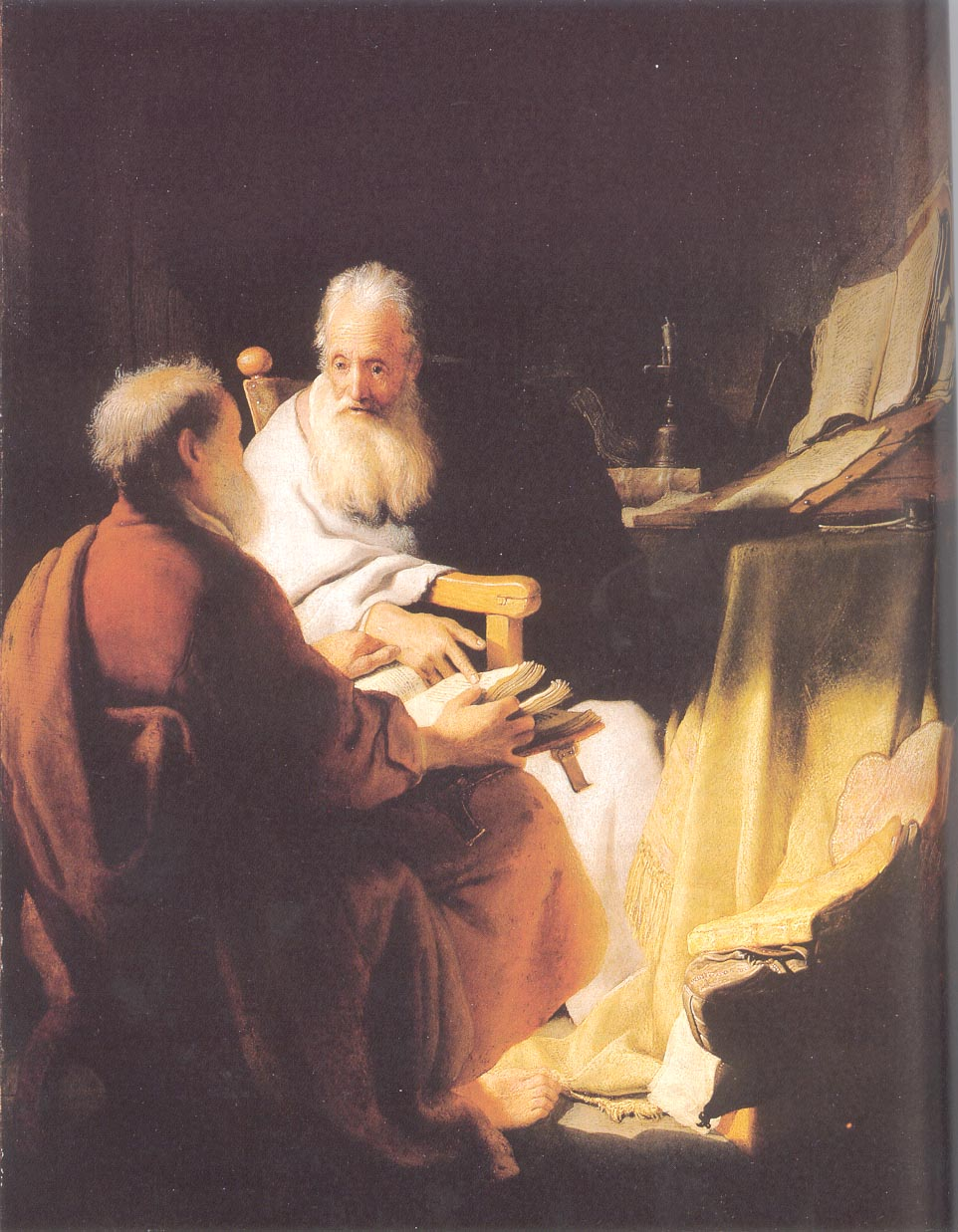
Rembrandt's Two old men disputing, 1628. This painting has been thought to depict Peter and Paul.

Despite the agreement presumably achieved at the Council of Jerusalem as understood by Paul, Paul recounts how he later publicly confronted Peter, also called the "Incident at Antioch" over Peter's reluctance to share a meal with Gentile Christians in Antioch.

Writing later of the incident, Paul recounts: "I opposed [Peter] to his face, because he was clearly in the wrong". Paul reports that he told Peter: "You are a Jew, yet you live like a Gentile and not like a Jew. How is it, then, that you force Gentiles to follow Jewish customs?" Paul also mentions that even Barnabas (his travelling companion and fellow apostle until that time) sided with Peter.

The outcome of the incident remains uncertain. The Catholic Encyclopedia states: "St. Paul's account of the incident leaves no doubt that St. Peter saw the justice of the rebuke." In contrast, L. Michael White's From Jesus to Christianity states: "The blowup with Peter was a total failure of political bravado, and Paul soon left Antioch as persona non grata, never again to return."

The primary source for the Incident at Antioch is Paul's letter to the Galatians.

=== Jews depicted as killers of Jesus ===
As noted by New Testament scholar Pieter Willem van der Horst, Paul accuses the Jews of killing Jesus and the prophets in 1 Thessalonians 2:14–16:

For you, brothers and sisters, became imitators of the churches of God in Christ Jesus in Judea, for you suffered the same things from your own compatriots as they did from the Jews, who killed both the Lord Jesus and the prophets and drove us out; they displease God and oppose everyone by hindering us from speaking to the Gentiles so that they may be saved. Thus they have been constantly filling up the measure of their sins; but God's wrath has overtaken them at last.

James P. Carroll, historian and former Catholic priest, cautions that this and similar statements in the Gospels of Matthew and John are properly viewed as "evidence not of Jew hatred but of sectarian conflicts among Jews" in the early years of the Christian church. Biblical scholar Gerd Lüdemann and Christian theologian Ingo Broer agree, but insist that the tone of the letter echoes pagan stereotypes about all Jews without reservation.

== Separation from Judaism ==
Paul's theology of the gospel contributed to the separation of the messianic sect of Christians from Judaism, a development contrary to Paul's own intent. He wrote that faith in Christ was alone decisive in salvation for Jews and Gentiles alike, making the schism between the followers of Christ and mainstream Jews inevitable and permanent. Without Paul's campaign against the legalists who opposed him, Christianity may have remained a dissenting sect within Judaism.

He argued that Gentile converts did not need to follow Jewish customs, get circumcised, follow Jewish dietary restrictions, or otherwise observe Mosaic law in order to have a share in the world to come. Teaching them to forsake idolatry for Noahidism, he insisted in his Epistle to the Romans on the positive value of the Law (see also Pauline passages opposing antinomianism) in its divine form. Since Paul's time, the polemical contrast that he made between the old and the new way of salvation has usually been weakened, with an emphasis on smooth development (Supersessionism) rather than stark contrast (Marcionism). See also New Perspective on Paul.

(see also Antinomianism in the New Testament and Abrogation of Old Covenant laws)

=== Pauline Christianity ===
Pauline Christianity is a term used to refer to a branch of Early Christianity associated with the beliefs and doctrines espoused by Paul the Apostle through his writings. The term is generally considered a pejorative by some who believe it carries the implication that Christianity as it is known is a corruption of the original teachings of Jesus, as in the doctrine of the Great Apostasy.

== Jewish views ==
=== Jewish historical reconstructions ===
Jewish interest in Paul is a recent phenomenon. Before the so-called Jewish reclamation of Jesus (as a Jew) in the eighteenth and nineteenth centuries, he had hardly featured in the popular Jewish imagination and little had been written about him by the religious leaders and scholars. Arguably, he is absent from the Talmud and rabbinical literature, although he makes an appearance in some variants of the medieval polemic Toledot Yeshu (as a spy for the rabbis). But with Jesus no longer regarded as the paradigm of gentile Christianity, Paul's position became more important in Jewish historical reconstructions of their religion's relationship with Christianity. He has featured as the key to building barriers (e.g. Heinrich Graetz and Martin Buber) or bridges (e.g. Isaac Mayer Wise and Claude G. Montefiore) in interfaith relations, as part of an intra-Jewish debate about what constitutes Jewish authenticity (e.g. Joseph Klausner and Hans Joachim Schoeps), and, on occasion, as a dialogical partner (e.g. Richard L. Rubenstein and Daniel Boyarin). He features in an oratorio (by Felix Mendelssohn), a painting (by Ludwig Meidner) and a play (by Franz Werfel), and there have been several novels about Paul (by Shalom Asch and Samuel Sandmel). Jewish philosophers (including Baruch Spinoza, Leo Shestov, and Jacob Taubes) and Jewish psychoanalysts (including Sigmund Freud and Hanns Sachs) have engaged with the apostle as one of the most influential figures in Western thought. Scholarly surveys of Jewish interest in Paul include those by Hagner (1980), Meissner (1996), and Langton (2010, 2011).

== See also ==
- Biblical law in Christianity
- Council of Jerusalem
- Crypto-Judaism
- Dual-covenant theology
- Early Christianity
  - Christianity in the 1st century
  - Circumcision controversy in early Christianity
  - History of early Christianity
  - God-fearers
  - Jewish Christianity
  - Judaizers
  - New Perspective on Paul
  - Pauline Christianity
  - Split of early Christianity and Judaism
- History of Christianity
  - Historical background of the New Testament
  - Historicity of Jesus
  - Historicity of the Acts of the Apostles
  - Historicity of the canonical Gospels
  - History of the Jews in the Roman Empire
- Jewish views on Jesus
  - Jesus in the Talmud
  - Rejection of Jesus
- Relations between Judaism and Christianity
  - Antisemitism in Christianity
  - British Israelism
  - Christian views on the Old Covenant
  - Christian Zionism and anti-Zionism
  - Christian–Jewish reconciliation
  - Pope John Paul II and Judaism
  - Sabbath in Christianity
  - Seven Laws of Noah
