= Nomist =

Nomist may refer to:

- Nomism, theological legalism
- Neonomianism, in Christian theology, the doctrine that the Gospel is a new law
- Covenantal nomism
