= Jacob Neusner =

American scholar of Judaism (1932–2016)

- Neusner in 2016
- Born: July 28, 1932; Hartford, Connecticut, US
- Died: October 8, 2016 (aged 84); Rhinebeck, New York, US
- Occupations: Scholar of Judaism, educator, translator
- Known for: Over 900 published books on Rabbinic Judaism
- Title: Distinguished Research Professor (University of South Florida)
- Board member of: National Endowment for the Humanities; National Endowment for the Arts
- Awards: Life Member, Clare Hall, Cambridge

Academic background
- Education: Harvard University; Hebrew University of Jerusalem; Jewish Theological Seminary of America; Columbia University
- Thesis: (1960)
- Academic advisors: Saul Lieberman, Harry Austryn Wolfson

Academic work
- Era: 20th–21st century
- Discipline: Religious studies, Jewish studies
- Sub-discipline: Rabbinic Judaism, Talmudic studies
- School or tradition: Form-critical and literary approaches to rabbinic literature
- Institutions: Dartmouth College; University of Wisconsin-Milwaukee; Brandeis University; Brown University; University of South Florida; Bard College
- Doctoral students: William Scott Green
- Main interests: Mishnah, Talmud, Rabbinic literature, Jewish-Christian dialogue
- Notable works: A History of the Jews in Babylonia (5 volumes); A Rabbi Talks with Jesus; translations of rabbinic texts
- Notable ideas: Treating rabbinic literature as historical and non-religious texts accessible within secular academia
- Influenced: Bruce Chilton; academic field of comparative religion

Notes
- Co-founder, Institute of Advanced Theology, Bard College (1994)

Jacob Neusner (July 28, 1932 – October 8, 2016) was an American academic scholar of Judaism. He was named as one of the most published authors in history, having written or edited more than 900 books.

Neusner's application of form criticism—a methodology derived from scholars of the New Testament—to Rabbinic texts was influential, but subject to criticism. Neusner's grasp of Rabbinic Hebrew and Aramaic has been challenged within academia.

== Early life and education ==
Neusner was born on July 28, 1932, in Hartford, Connecticut, the son of Reform Jewish parents. He graduated from William H. Hall High School in West Hartford. He then attended Harvard University, where he met Harry Austryn Wolfson and first encountered Jewish religious texts. After graduating from Harvard in 1953, Neusner spent a year at the University of Oxford.

Neusner then attended the Jewish Theological Seminary of America, where he was ordained as a Conservative Jewish rabbi. After spending a year at Hebrew University of Jerusalem, he returned to the Jewish Theological Seminary and studied the Talmud under Saul Lieberman, who would later write a famous, and highly negative, critique of Neusner's translation of the Jerusalem Talmud. He graduated in 1960 with a master's degree. Later that year, he received a doctorate in religion from Columbia University.

== Career ==
After his studies, Neusner briefly taught at Dartmouth College. He also held positions at University of Wisconsin–Milwaukee, Brandeis University, and Brown University. From 1990 to 2000 he was distinguished research professor at the University of South Florida.

In 1994, Neusner began teaching at Bard College, working there until 2014. While there he founded the Institute for Advanced Theology with Bruce Chilton. He was a life member of Clare Hall, Cambridge University. He was the only scholar to have served on both the National Endowment for the Humanities and the National Endowment for the Arts.

Neusner died on October 8, 2016, aged 84, in Rhinebeck, New York.

== Scholarship ==
Neusner's research centered on rabbinic Judaism of the Mishnaic and Talmudic eras. His work focused on bringing the study of rabbinical text into nonreligious educational institutions and treating them as non-religious documents. Neusner's five-volume History of the Jews in Babylonia, published between 1965 and 1969, is said to be the first to consider the Babylonian Talmud in its Iranian context. Neusner studied Persian and Middle Persian to do so.

Neusner, with his contemporaries, translated into English nearly the entire Rabbinic canon. This work has opened up many Rabbinic documents to scholars of other fields unfamiliar with Hebrew and Aramaic, within the academic study of religion, as well as in ancient history, culture and Near and Middle Eastern Studies.

In addition to his work on Rabbinic texts, Neusner was involved in Jewish Studies and Religious Studies. Neusner saw Judaism as "not particular but exemplary, and Jews not as special but (merely) interesting".

=== Interfaith work ===
Neusner also wrote a number of works exploring the relationship of Judaism to other religions. His A Rabbi Talks with Jesus attempts to establish a religiously sound framework for Judaic-Christian interchange. It earned the praise of Pope Benedict XVI and the nickname "The Pope's Favorite Rabbi". In his book Jesus of Nazareth, Benedict referred to it as "by far the most important book for the Jewish-Christian dialogue in the last decade".

== Political views ==
Neusner called himself a Zionist, but also said "Israel’s flag is not mine. My homeland is America". He was culturally conservative, and opposed feminism and affirmative action.

Neusner was a signer of the conservative Cornwall Declaration on Environmental Stewardship, which expresses concern over "unfounded or undue concerns" of environmentalists such as "fears of destructive manmade global warming, overpopulation, and rampant species loss".

== Works ==
Neusner's original adoption of form criticism to the rabbinic texts proved highly influential both in North American and European studies of early Jewish and Christian texts. His later detailed studies of Mishnaic law lack the densely footnoted historical approach characteristic of his earlier work. As a result, these works, focusing on literary form, tend to ignore contemporary external sources and modern scholarship dealing with these issues. The irony was that his approach adopted the analytic methodology developed by Christian scholars for the New Testament, while denying there was any relationship between the Judeo-Christian corpus and rabbinic works, the latter being treated as isolates detached from their broader historical contexts. A number of scholars in his field of study were critical of this phase in his work. (Note: Attributed to multiple sources:)

Some were critical of his methodology, and asserted that many of his arguments were circular or attempts to prove "negative assumptions" from a lack of evidence, while others concentrated on Neusner's reading and interpretations of Rabbinic texts, finding that his account was forced and inaccurate.

Neusner's view that the Second Commonwealth Pharisees were a sectarian group centered on "table fellowship" and ritual food purity practices, and lacked interest in wider Jewish moral values or social issues, has been criticized by E. P. Sanders, Solomon Zeitlin and Hyam Maccoby.

Some scholars questioned Neusner's grasp of Rabbinic Hebrew and Aramaic. The most famous and biting criticism came from one of Neusner's former teachers, Saul Lieberman, about Neusner's translation of the Jerusalem Talmud. Lieberman wrote, in an article circulated before his death and then published posthumously: "...one begins to doubt the credibility of the translator [Neusner]. And indeed after a superficial perusal of the translation, the reader is stunned by the translator's ignorance of rabbinic Hebrew, of Aramaic grammar, and above all of the subject matter with which he deals". Ending his review, Lieberman states "I conclude with a clear conscience: The right place for [Neusner's] English translation is the waste basket" while at the same time qualifying that "[i]n fairness to the translator I must add that his various essays on Jewish topics are meritorious. They abound in brilliant insights and intelligent questions". Lieberman highlights his criticism as being of Neusner's "ignorance of the original languages", which Lieberman claims even Neusner was originally "well aware of" inasmuch as he had previously relied on responsible English renderings of rabbinic sources, e.g., Soncino Press, before later choosing to create his own renderings of rabbinic texts. Lieberman's views were seconded by Morton Smith, another teacher who resented Neusner's criticism of his views that Jesus was a homosexual magician.

Neusner thought Lieberman's approach reflected the closed mentality of a yeshiva-based education that lacked familiarity with modern formal textual-critical techniques, and he eventually got round to replying to Lieberman's charges by writing in turn an equally scathing monograph entitled: Why There Never Was a Talmud of Caesarea: Saul Lieberman’s Mistakes (1994). In it he attributed to Lieberman 'obvious errors of method, blunders in logic' and argued that Lieberman's work showed a systematic inability to accomplish critical research.
