= Michael Bird (theologian) =

Australian Anglican priest and theologian (born 1974)

The Reverend Michael Bird
- Born: 18 November 1974 (age 51); Paderborn, West Germany
- Occupations: Vice principal and lecturer, Ridley College (Melbourne)

Academic background
- Education: University of Queensland (Ph.D.)
- Thesis: Many will come from the East and the West: Jesus and the Origins of the Gentile Mission (2005)
- Doctoral advisor: Rick Strelan; Robert L. Webb

Academic work
- Discipline: Theology and New Testament
- Sub-discipline: Pauline studies, Christology, patristics
- Website: patheos.com/blogs/euangelion

Michael F. Bird (born 18 November 1974) is a British-Australian New Testament scholar, theologian and Anglican priest.

== Life and career ==
Bird is originally from Britain, but has lived in Australia for the majority of his life. He served in the Australian military, where he discovered his faith. After becoming a Christian he was firstly a Baptist, then a Presbyterian and now an Anglican. He has been called by the ecumenical media platform Eternity a "heavy hitter" in the world of New Testament scholarship and Jesus's divinity.

Bird is vice principal and lecturer in theology and New Testament at Ridley College, having previously taught at the Brisbane School of Theology and Highland Theological College. He studied at Malyon College and the University of Queensland. He has also been a Distinguished Research Professor of Theology at Houston Christian University.

Bird has written a number of books, including The New Testament in Its World (2019, with N. T. Wright), Evangelical Theology: A Biblical and Systematic Introduction (2013) and The Gospel of the Lord: How the Early Church Wrote the Story of Jesus (2014). The Gospel of the Lord won the Biblical Studies section of the 2015 Christianity Today Book Awards. Bird is also the author of a fantasy novel titled Iskandar: And the Immortal King of Iona.

Bird is a member of the Evangelical Theological Society, the Society of Biblical Literature and Studiorum Novi Testamenti Societas.

In November 2015, he was ordained as a priest in the Anglican Church of Australia.

== Works ==
=== Books ===
- Bird, Michael F. (2006). Jesus and the Origins of the Gentile Mission. The Library of New Testament Studies. Vol. 331. London: T&T Clark. ISBN 9780567044730.
- ——— (2007). The Saving Righteousness of God: studies on Paul, justification and the new perspective. Paternoster biblical monographs. Milton Keynes, UK: Paternoster. ISBN 9781842274651. OCLC 154723550.
- ———; Crossley, James G. (2008). How did Christianity Begin?: a believer and non-believer examine the evidence. London: SPCK; Peabody, Mass.: Hendrickson Publishers. ISBN 9780281058501. OCLC 233940908.
- ——— (2008). Introducing Paul: the man, his mission, and his message. Downers Grove, IL: InterVarsity Press. ISBN 9780830828975. OCLC 262430760.
- ——— (2009). Colossians & Philemon: a new covenant commentary. New Covenant Commentary Series. Cambridge, England: The Lutterworth Press. ISBN 9780718842819. OCLC 889271472.
- ——— (2010). Crossing over Sea and Land: Jewish missionary activity in the Second Temple period. Peabody, MA: Hendrickson Publishers. ISBN 9781598564341. OCLC 430054695.
- ——— (2012). Jesus is the Christ: the Messianic testimony of the Gospels. Downers Grove, IL: InterVarsity Press. ISBN 9780830828234. OCLC 812258100.
- ——— (2020). Evangelical Theology: a Biblical and systematic introduction (2nd Ed). Grand Rapids, MI: Zondervan. ISBN 9780310093985. OCLC 1152425215.
- ——— (2014). The Gospel of the Lord: how the early church wrote the story of Jesus. Grand Rapids, MI: Eerdmans. ISBN 9780802867766. OCLC 854612618.
- ———; Evans, Craig A.; Gathercole, Simon J.; Hill, Charles E.; Tilling, Chris (2014). How God became Jesus: the real origins of belief in Jesus' divine nature--a response to Bart Ehrman. Grand Rapids, MI: Zondervan. ISBN 9780310519591. OCLC 871186821.
- ———; Johnson, Adam J. (2016). The Reconciling Wisdom of God: Reframing the Doctrine of the Atonement. Snaphots. Bellingham, WA: Lexham Press. ISBN 9781577997252. OCLC 989057109.
- ———; Wright, N. T. (2019). The New Testament in its World: An Introduction to the History, Literature, and Theology of the First Christians. Grand Rapids: Zondervan. ISBN 9780310499305. - (forthcoming Nov. 2019)
- ———; Wright, N. T. (2024). Jesus and the Powers. Grand Rapids: Zondervan. ISBN 9780310162247.

=== As editor ===
- ———; Willitts, Joel, eds. (2011). Paul and the Gospels: christologies, conflicts, and convergences. Library of New Testament studies. Vol. 411. London & New York: T & T Clark. ISBN 9780567617422. OCLC 697599761.
- ———; Dodson, Joseph R., eds. (2011). Paul and the Second Century. Library of New Testament studies. Vol. 412. London & New York: T & T Clark. ISBN 9780567158277. OCLC 657604488.
