= N. T. Wright =

English Anglican bishop (born 1948)

The Right Reverend N. T. Wright FRSE
- Bishop of Durham
- Wright in 2012
- Church: Church of England
- Diocese: Durham
- In office: 2003 to 2010
- Other posts: 2019–present: Senior research fellow, University of Oxford; 2010–19: Research Professor, University of St Andrews; 2000–03: Canon Theologian, Westminster Abbey; 1994–99: Dean of Lichfield

Orders
- Ordination: 1975
- Consecration: 2003

Personal details
- Born: Nicholas Thomas Wright; 1 December 1948 (age 77) Morpeth, Northumberland, England
- Denomination: Anglican
- Residence: 2003–10 Auckland Castle
- Spouse: Maggie
- Children: 4
- Education: University of Oxford (BA, DPhil, DD)

Member of the House of Lords
- Lord Spiritual
- Ex officio as Bishop of Durham; 5 November 2003 – 31 August 2010

Nicholas Thomas "Tom" Wright (born 1 December 1948) is an English New Testament scholar, Pauline theologian and Anglican bishop. He was the Bishop of Durham and Lord Spiritual in the UK Parliament from 2003 to 2010. He then became research professor of New Testament and Early Christianity at St Mary's College in the University of St Andrews in Scotland until 2019, when he became a senior research fellow at Wycliffe Hall at the University of Oxford.

Wright writes about theology and Christian life and the relationship between them. He advocates a biblical re-evaluation of theological matters such as justification, women's ordination, and popular Christian views about life after death. He has also criticised the idea of a literal Rapture.

The author of over 70 books, Wright is highly regarded in academic and theological circles for his "Christian Origins and the Question of God" series. The third volume, The Resurrection of the Son of God, is considered by many clergy and theologians to be a seminal Christian work on the resurrection of Jesus.

== Early life ==
Wright was born in Morpeth, Northumberland. In a 2003 interview, he said that he could never remember a time when he was not aware of the presence and love of God and recalled an occasion when he was four or five when "sitting by myself at Morpeth and being completely overcome, coming to tears, by the fact that God loved me so much he died for me. Everything that has happened to me since has produced wave upon wave of the same."

He was educated at Sedbergh School in the Yorkshire Dales, and in the late 1960s Wright sang and played guitar in a folk club on the west side of Vancouver. In 1971, Wright received his BA in literae humaniores, with first class honours, from Exeter College, Oxford. During that time he was president of the undergraduate Oxford Inter-Collegiate Christian Union.

From 1971 to 1975, he studied for the Anglican ministry at Wycliffe Hall, Oxford, receiving his (Oxford) MA at the end of this period. He was later awarded a Doctor of Divinity (DD) degree by the University of Oxford.

== Career ==
In 1975 he became a junior research fellow at Merton College, Oxford, and later also junior chaplain. From 1978 to 1981 he was a fellow and chaplain at Downing College, Cambridge. In 1981 he received his DPhil from Merton College, his thesis topic being "The Messiah and the People of God: A Study in Pauline Theology with Particular Reference to the Argument of the Epistle to the Romans". After this, he served as assistant professor of New Testament studies at McGill University, Montreal (1981 to 1986), then as chaplain, fellow and tutor at Worcester College and lecturer in New Testament in the University of Oxford (1986 to 1993).

He moved from Oxford to become dean of Lichfield Cathedral (1994 to 1999) and then returned briefly to Oxford as a visiting fellow at Merton College, before taking up his appointment as canon theologian at Westminster Abbey in 2000.

From 1995 to 2000, Wright wrote the weekly Sunday's "Readings" column for the Church Times. He has said that writing the column gave him the "courage" to embark upon his popular ... for Everyone (SPCK) series of commentaries on New Testament books.

In 2003 Wright became the Bishop of Durham; he was consecrated a bishop on 3 July 2003 at York Minster by David Hope, Archbishop of York. On 4 August 2006 he was appointed to the Court of Ecclesiastical Causes Reserved for a period of five years.

He resigned from Durham on 31 August 2010 to take up an appointment as research professor of New Testament and Early Christianity at St Mary's College, St Andrews which enabled him to concentrate on his academic and broadcasting work.

In 2019 he delivered the Gifford Lectures on Discerning the Dawn: History, Eschatology and New Creation at the University of Aberdeen.

On 1 October 2019 Wright was appointed a senior research fellow at Wycliffe Hall, Oxford, where he had originally studied for the Anglican ministry from 1971 to 1973.

== Views ==
=== New Testament doctrine ===
In his popular 2008 book Surprised by Hope, Wright outlines the scriptural emphasis on resurrection as the proper hope of all Christians. Wright is critical of the North American church's overemphasis on "going to heaven when you die" and the underemphasis on the resurrection from the dead, though he does not deny the teaching that a person's soul lives on after death. He advocates a reunion of soteriology and ecclesiology, commenting that such a connection is often neglected in Protestantism. In addition, he is critical of various popular theological ideas, such as the dispensationalist doctrine of the rapture.

=== New Perspective on Paul ===
Wright is one of the leading figures in the New Perspective on Paul interpretation, or rather group of interpretations, of the Pauline letters. Wright contends that Paul cannot be ignored by any serious Christian and that, through his central place within the New Testament canon, Paul has come to be abused, misunderstood, imposed upon, and approached with incorrect or inappropriate questions about the Christian faith. According to Wright, "Paul in the twentieth century, then, has been used and abused much as in the first. Can we, as the century draws towards its close, listen a bit more closely to him? Can we somehow repent of the ways we have mishandled him and respect his own way of doing things a bit more?"

This question reflects the key consideration for the New Perspective on Paul and a fundamental aim of Wright's scholarship: to allow the apostle Paul to speak for himself without imposing modern considerations and questions upon him and in so doing, seeking to ascertain what St. Paul was really trying to say to the people he was writing to. From this, Wright contends that by examining the Pauline corpus through this unique perspective, difficult passages within the text become illuminated in new ways, his letters gain coherence both in their particularities as well as with one another, and it provides an overall picture of what Paul was about, without doing violence to the little details within the letters.

The beginning of the "new perspective" is the work of E. P. Sanders and his book Paul and Palestinian Judaism. In this 1977 work, Sanders argued that the prevailing view of first-century Judaism in the New Testament was inaccurate. He described it instead as "covenantal nomism", which emphasised God's election of a people and adherence to the Torah as a way of "staying in" the religion (rather than a way of "getting in").

Wright found that Sanders supported the picture he himself had been forming, but nevertheless for the next decade much of what Wright wrote was in disagreement with Sanders on various points. Wright agrees with other "new perspective" scholars that the assumption that the Jews were guilty of a kind of "works-righteousness" is untrue, and that the story of God and the covenant people Israel comes to a climax with Jesus.

=== Paul and justification ===
In speaking on justification, Wright contends, "the discussions of justification in much of the history of the church, certainly since Augustine, got off on the wrong foot – at least in terms of understanding Paul – and they have stayed there ever since." In this way, the Church, according to Wright, has subsumed discussions surrounding the reconciliation of man to God under the label of justification, which has subsequently given the concept an emphasis quite absent from what he believes is found within the New Testament. This leads Wright to argue that this incorrect perception of justification has done violence to the text for hundreds of years and that the text itself should be the starting point in determining what Paul seeks to say about justification.

Through his attempt of returning to the text to allow Paul to speak for himself as he suggests, Wright offers a definition of what he believes the apostle means by ‘justification,’ which is contrary to popular belief. In crafting said definition, the interpreter identifies three pieces, which he believes to be vital to this consideration: that justification is dependent upon covenant language, that it utilises law-court language, functioning within the covenantal setting as a strong explanatory metaphor of justification, and that it cannot be understood within a Pauline context as separate from eschatology. Through the inclusion of covenant language, justification alludes to the presence of sin and wickedness in the world and the way in which the covenant was instituted to bring about salvation. Within this context, the law-court metaphorical language acknowledges God's role as judge who is to put the world to rights, to deal with evil and to restore justice and order to the cosmos. Finally, Wright's definition of ‘justification’ within Paul's letters acknowledges that the term is not associated, as has commonly been perceived, with one's personal needs necessary to attain salvation, but instead with what marked someone as a member of God's people.

=== "Secular utopianism" ===
In 2008, Wright criticised "secular utopianism", accusing it of advocating "the right to kill unborn children and surplus old people". The Times columnist David Aaronovitch challenged Wright specifically to substantiate his claim that any secular group does indeed advocate the killing of elderly people, leading to an exchange in which Wright held to his main point.

=== Historical Jesus ===
Regarding the historical Jesus, Wright follows the "thoroughgoing eschatology" tradition of Albert Schweitzer against the "thoroughgoing scepticism" of William Wrede and the Jesus Seminar, whom he regards as Wrede's modern-day counterparts. Wright also argues for a 'very Jewish' Jesus who was nonetheless opposed to some high-profile aspects of first-century Judaism. Similarly, Wright speaks of Jesus as 'doubly', 'multiply', 'thoroughly', and 'deeply' subversive, while at the same time distancing Jesus from other known seditious and revolutionary movements within first-century Judea. In some ways his views are similar to those of such scholars as E. P. Sanders and the lesser-known Ben F. Meyer (whom Wright calls "the unsung hero" of New Testament studies). However he disagrees with the view of Sanders that the Pharisees would not have exhibited the violent opposition to Jesus depicted in the Gospels. He has also defended the belief in a literal Second Coming and the resurrection of the dead as central to Christianity.

Wright is critical of more liberal theological circles. The Jesus Seminar's Marcus Borg, with whom Wright shared mutual admiration and respect, co-authored The Meaning of Jesus: Two Visions with Wright to elaborate their contrasting opinions. In 2005, at the Greer-Heard Point-Counterpoint Forum, Wright discussed the historicity of Jesus' resurrection with Jesus Seminar co-founder John Dominic Crossan. Wright and Crossan, who also have mutual admiration, hold very different opinions on this foundational Christian doctrine. For Crossan, the resurrection of Jesus is a theological interpretation of events by the writers of the New Testament. For Wright, however, the resurrection is a historical event—coherent with the worldview of Second Temple Judaism—fundamental to the New Testament.

With the publication of Wright's 2012 book, How God Became King: The Forgotten Story of the Gospels, Wright has been critical of some ideas concerning the historical Jesus in both US evangelical preaching and the work of C. S. Lewis, who Wright admits was a major influence in his own life. In an interview, Wright summarises this critique: "One of the targets of this book is Christians who say: Yes, the Bible is true. It's inerrant and so on. But, then, they pay no attention to what the Bible actually says. For too many Christians it seems sufficient to say Christ was born of a Virgin, died on a cross and was resurrected—but never did anything else in between. I'm saying: That’s not the way to understand the Gospels."

=== Homosexuality in the Anglican Communion ===
Wright was the senior member from the Church of England of the Lambeth Commission set up to deal with controversies following the ordination of Gene Robinson as a bishop of the Episcopal Church in the United States. In 2009, the Episcopal Church authorised the clergy to celebrate commitment liturgies for people in same-sex relationships. Writing on The Times, Wright described the action as a "clear break with the rest of the Anglican Communion".

In December 2005 he announced to the press, on the day that the first civil partnership ceremonies took place in England, that he would be likely to take disciplinary action against any clergy registering as civil partners or any clergy blessing such partnerships.

He has argued that "Justice never means 'treating everybody the same way', but 'treating people appropriately'". In August 2009, he issued a statement saying:

...someone, sooner or later, needs to spell out further (wearisome though it will be) the difference between (a) the "human dignity and civil liberty" of those with homosexual and similar instincts and (b) their "rights", as practising let alone ordained Christians, to give physical expression to those instincts. As the Pope has pointed out, the language of "human rights" has now been downgraded in public discourse to the special pleading of every interest-group.

=== Reviews of Wright's scholarly work ===
Wright's work has been praised by many scholars of varying views, including James Dunn, Gordon Fee, Richard B. Hays and Rowan Williams, former Archbishop of Canterbury. For instance, James Crossley described Wright's The Resurrection of the Son of God as having "much to commend" and that "Many will be persuaded that his representations of post-mortem beliefs in the Graeco-Roman world, Hebrew Bible, early Judaism and early Christianity are generally accurate." Rafael Rodriguez described Wright alongside James DG Dunn as "two behemoths of NT and historical Jesus scholarship." Wright has received praise from Catholics, such as bishop Robert Barron, who has cited Wright's historical scholarship on multiple occasions.

Critics of his work are also found across a broad range of theological camps. Some Reformed theologians such as John Piper have questioned Wright's theology, particularly over whether or not he denies the Protestant doctrine of justification by faith alone. Although Piper considers Wright's presentation confusing, he does not dismiss Wright's view as false. In response, Wright has stated he wishes Piper would "exegete Paul differently" and that his book "isn’t always a critique of what I’m actually saying." Wright also expressed how he has warmed to Piper and considers him a "good, beloved brother in Christ, doing a good job, building people up in the faith, teaching them how to live." In 2009, Wright has since addressed the issue in his book Justification: God’s Plan and Paul's Vision. He has sought to clarify his position further in an interview with InterVarsity Press.

Many conservative evangelicals have also questioned whether Wright denies penal substitution, but Wright has stated that he denies only its caricature but affirms this doctrine, especially within the overall framework of the Christus Victor model of atonement.

Despite criticism of some of his work by Reformed theologians, other Reformed leaders have embraced his contribution in other areas, such as Tim Keller who praised Wright's work on the resurrection.

Writing an extensive review of The Resurrection of the Son of God on The Heythrop Journal, Catholic fundamental theologian Joseph J. Smith SJ has criticised Wright's views about the resurrection of Jesus, stating that neither the Gospel narratives of the Resurrection appearances nor Pauline texts cited by Wright support his view that the resurrected body was "robustly physical".

== Public lectures ==
In 2019, Wright delivered the 32nd Erasmus Lecture, titled Loving to Know, organized by First Things magazine and the Institute on Religion and Public Life. In his lecture, Wright explored the relationship between love, knowledge, and truth within the Christian intellectual tradition. Drawing from Scripture, theology, and philosophy, he argued that genuine understanding arises not from detached rationality but from an engaged love for God and creation — a theme central to his broader work on faith and reason.

== Honours ==
Wright has been awarded several honorary doctoral degrees, including from Durham University in July 2007, the John Leland Center for Theological Studies in April 2008, the University of St Andrews in 2009, Heythrop College (University of London) in 2010 and the Ecumenical Institute of Theology at St. Mary's Seminary & University in May 2012.

In 2014, he was awarded the Burkitt Medal by the British Academy "in recognition of special service to Biblical Studies". It was announced in March 2015 that he was to be made a fellow of the Royal Society of Edinburgh (FRSE).

== Selected works ==
- Wright, NT (1991), The Climax of the Covenant: Christ and the Law in Pauline Theology, Fortress Press.
- ——— (1997), What Saint Paul Really Said: Was Paul of Tarsus the Real Founder of Christianity?, Grand Rapids, MI: William B Eerdmans, ISBN 0-80284445-6.
- ——— (1997a), The Original Jesus: the life and vision of a revolutionary, Grand Rapids, Michigan: William B Eerdmans, ISBN 0-8028-4283-6, OCLC 38436317.
- ——— (1997b) [1994, Society for Promoting Christian Knowledge (SPCK)], Following Jesus: Biblical Reflections on Discipleship, Wm B Eerdmans.
- ———; Borg, Marcus J (1999), The Meaning of Jesus: Two visions, New York: HarperCollins, ISBN 0-06-060875-7.
- ——— (2000), The Challenge of Jesus: Rediscovering Who Jesus Was and Is, Downers Grove, IL: InterVarsity Press.
- ———; Crossan, John Dominic (2006) [2005, Augsburg Fortress], Stewart, Robert B (ed.), The Resurrection of Jesus: John Dominic Crossan and NT Wright in Dialogue (paperback ed.), SPCK.
- ——— (2005), Paul: In Fresh Perspective, Fortress Press ("Paul: Fresh Perspectives" co-edition SPCK, 2005).
- ——— (2005), The Last Word: Beyond the Bible Wars to a New Understanding of the Authority of Scripture, San Francisco: Harper.
- ——— (2006), Simply Christian: Why Christianity Makes Sense, London: SPCK co-edition New York: HarperCollins, 2006.
- ——— (2006), Judas and the Gospel of Jesus: Have We Missed the Truth about Christianity?, London: SPCK; Grand Rapids: Baker Books, 2006.
- ——— (2006), Evil and the Justice of God, SPCK; Intervarsity Press, 2006.
- ——— (2007), "The Reasons for Christ's Crucifixion", in Jersak, Brad; Hardin, Michael (eds.), Stricken by God? Nonviolent Identification and the Victory of Christ.
- ——— (2008), Surprised by Hope: Rethinking Heaven, the Resurrection, and the Mission of the Church, London: SPCK; New York: HarperOne, ISBN 978-0-06-155182-6.
- ———; Evans, Craig A (2008), Miller, Troy A (ed.), Jesus, the Final Days: What Really Happened, London: SPCK. Louisville: WestminsterJohnKnox, 2009.
- ——— (2009), Justification: God's Plan and Paul's Vision, SPCK, ISBN 978-0-83083863-9.
- ——— (2010), Virtue Reborn, London: SPCK. Also After You Believe: Why Christian Character Matters, HarperOne North America, 2010.
- ——— (2011) [The Last Word, 2005], Scripture and the Authority of God: How to Read the Bible Today (rev & exp ed.), HarperOne, ISBN 978-0-06-201195-4.
- ——— (2011), Simply Jesus: A New Vision of Who He Was, What He Did, and Why He Matters, New York: HarperOne, ISBN 978-0-06-208439-2.
- ——— (2012), How God Became King: The Forgotten Story of the Gospels, New York: HarperOne, ISBN 978-0-06-173057-3.
- ——— (2013), The Case for the Psalms: Why They Are Essential, New York: HarperOne, ISBN 978-0-06-223050-8.
  Published in Britain the following year as: ——— (2014), Finding God in the Psalms, London: SPCK, ISBN 978-0-281-06989-7.
- ——— (2013), Pauline Perspectives: Essays on Paul, 1978-2013, Ausburg Fortress, ISBN 978-0-8006-9963-5.
- ——— (2014), Surprised by Scripture: Engaging Contemporary Issues, New York: HarperOne, ISBN 978-0-06-223053-9.
- ——— (2014), Paul and His Recent Interpreters, Ausburg Fortress, ISBN 978-0-8006-9964-2.
- ——— (2015), Simply Good News: Why the Gospel Is News and What Makes It Good, New York: HarperOne, ISBN 978-0-06-233434-3.
- ——— (2016), The Day the Revolution Began: Reconsidering the Meaning of Jesus's Crucifixion, New York: HarperOne, ISBN 978-0062334381.
- ——— (2018). Paul: A Biography. New York: HarperOne. ISBN 978-0-06-173058-0.
- ———; Bird, Michael F. (2019). The New Testament in its World: an introduction to the history, literature, and theology of the first Christians. Grand Rapids, MI: Zondervan Academic. ISBN 9780310499305. OCLC 1090200946.
- ———; Bird, Michael F. (2019). The New Testament in its World Workbook: an introduction to the history, literature, and theology of the first Christians. Grand Rapids, MI: Zondervan Academic. ISBN 9780310528708. OCLC 1090195011.
- ——— (2021). Galatians (Commentaries for Christian Formation). Grand Rapids: Eerdmans. ISBN 978-0-8028-2560-5.

=== Christian Origins and the Question of God series ===
Four volumes published, two more planned:

- ——— (1992c), The New Testament and the People of God: Christian Origins and the Question of God, vol. 1, Fortress Press, ISBN 978-0-8006-2681-5.
- ——— (1997c), Jesus and the Victory of God: Christian Origins and the Question of God, vol. 2, Fortress Press, ISBN 978-0-8006-2682-2.
- ——— (2003c), The Resurrection of the Son of God: Christian Origins and the Question of God, vol. 3, Fortress Press, ISBN 978-0-8006-2679-2.
- ——— (2013c), Paul and the Faithfulness of God: Christian Origins and the Question of God, vol. 4, Fortress Press, ISBN 978-0-8006-2683-9.

=== For Everyone series ===
The For Everyone series, a commentary by Wright on the New Testament, was completed in 2011:

- Matthew for Everyone, Part 1: Chapters 1–15 (2nd ed.), SPCK and Westminster John Knox Press, 2004, ISBN 978-0-281-05301-8.
- Matthew for Everyone, Part 2: Chapters 16–28 (2nd ed.), SPCK and Westminster John Knox Press, 2004, ISBN 978-0-281-05487-9.
- Mark for Everyone (2nd ed.), SPCK and Westminster John Knox Press, 2004, ISBN 978-0-281-05299-8.
- Luke for Everyone (2nd ed.), SPCK and Westminster John Knox Press, 2004, ISBN 978-0-281-05300-1.
- John for Everyone, Part 1: Chapters 1–10 (paperback ed.), SPCK and Westminster John Knox Press, 2004, ISBN 978-0-281-05302-5.
- John for Everyone, Part 2: Chapters 11–21 (2nd ed.), SPCK and Westminster John Knox Press, 2004, ISBN 978-0-281-05520-3.
- Acts for Everyone, Part 1: Chapters 1–12, SPCK, 2008, ISBN 978-0-281-05308-7.
- Acts for Everyone, Part 2: Chapters 13–28. SPCK, 2008. ISBN 978-0-281-05546-3
- Paul for Everyone: Romans, Part 1: Chapters 1–8. 2nd ed. SPCK, 2004. ISBN 978-0-281-05736-8
- Paul for Everyone: Romans, Part 2: Chapters 9–16. 2nd ed. SPCK, 2004. ISBN 978-0-281-05737-5
- Paul for Everyone: 1 Corinthians. 2nd ed. SPCK, 2004. ISBN 978-0-281-05305-6
- Paul for Everyone: 2 Corinthians. 2nd ed. SPCK, 2004. ISBN 978-0-281-05306-3
- Paul for Everyone: Galatians and Thessalonians. 2nd ed. SPCK, 2004. ISBN 978-0-281-05304-9
- Paul for Everyone: the Prison Letters: Ephesians, Philipians, Colossians and Philemon. 2nd ed. SPCK and Westminster John Knox Press, 2004. ISBN 978-0-281-05303-2
- Paul for Everyone: the Pastoral Letters: Titus and 1 and 2 Timothy. 2nd ed. SPCK, 2004. ISBN 978-0-281-05310-0
- Hebrews for Everyone. 2nd ed. SPCK, 2004. ISBN 978-0-281-05307-0
- Early Christian Letters for Everyone: James, Peter, John and Judah. SPCK, 2011. ISBN 978-0-281-06465-6
- Revelation for Everyone. SPCK, 2011. ISBN 978-0-281-06463-2
- James for Everyone. SPCK, 2012. ISBN 978-0-281-06859-3

== See also ==
- Theological critical realism

Church of England titles
Preceded by Michael Turnbull	Bishop of Durham; 2003–2010	Succeeded by Justin Welby
