= Bruce Chilton =

American scholar of religion (born 1949)

Bruce D. Chilton
- Born: September 27, 1949 (age 77); Roslyn, NY
- Occupations: Biblical scholar and academic
- Known for: Rabbi Jesus: An Intimate Biography
- Title: Bernard Iddings Bell Professor of Philosophy and Religion

Academic background
- Education: Bard College; General Theological Seminary; University of Cambridge
- Influences: Ben F. Meyer

Bruce D. Chilton (born September 27, 1949 in Roslyn, NY) is an American scholar of early Christianity and Judaism, and an Episcopal priest. He is Bernard Iddings Bell Professor of Religion at Bard College, formerly Lillian Claus Professor of New Testament at Yale University, and Rector of the Church of St John the Evangelist He holds a PhD in New Testament from Cambridge University (St. John's College). He has previously held academic positions at the Universities of Cambridge, Sheffield, and Münster.

He wrote the first critical commentary on the Aramaic version of Isaiah (The Isaiah Targum, 1987), as well as academic studies that analyze Jesus in his Judaic context (A Galilean Rabbi and His Bible, 1984; The Temple of Jesus, 1992; Pure Kingdom, 1996), and explain the Bible critically (Redeeming Time: The Wisdom of Ancient Jewish and Christian Festal Calendars, 2002; The Cambridge Companion to the Bible, 2007).

He founded two academic periodicals, Journal for the Study of the New Testament and The Bulletin for Biblical Research. Chilton was awarded the Doctor of Divinity degree honoris causa by General Theological Seminary in 2011. He has also been active in the ministry of the Episcopal Church, and was Rector of the Church of St. John the Evangelist in Barrytown, New York.

His popular books have been widely reviewed. Rabbi Jesus: An Intimate Biography showed Jesus' development through the environments that proved formative influences on him. Those environments, illuminated by archaeology and by historical sources, include: (1) rural Jewish Galilee, (2) the movement of John the Baptist, (3) the towns Jesus encountered as a rabbi, (4) the political strategy of Herod Antipas, and (5) deep controversy concerning the Temple in Jerusalem.

Bruce and his wife, Odile, live in Annandale-on-Hudson, New York. They are the parents of two sons.

== Works ==
=== Popular books ===
- Chilton, Bruce D. (2000). Rabbi Jesus: An Intimate Biography. New York: Doubleday. ISBN 978-0-385-49793-0. OCLC 44019167.
- ——— (2004). Rabbi Paul: An Intellectual Biography. New York: Doubleday. ISBN 978-0-385-50862-9. OCLC 54006717.
- ——— (2005). Mary Magdalene: A Biography. New York: Doubleday. ISBN 978-0-385-51318-0. OCLC 58789029.
- ——— (2008). Abraham's Curse: The Roots of Violence in Judaism, Christianity and Islam. New York: Doubleday. ISBN 978-0-385-52027-0. OCLC 157023255.

=== Academic books ===
- ——— (1982). The Glory of Israel: the theology and provenience of the Isaiah Targum. Journal for the study of the Old Testament - Supplement series. Vol. 23. Sheffield: JSOT Press. ISBN 978-0-567-46092-9. OCLC 276358830.
- ——— (1984). A Galilean Rabbi and his Bible: Jesus' own interpretation of Isaiah. London: SPCK & Michael Glazer. ISBN 978-0-281-04108-4. OCLC 715353922.
- ——— (1987). The Isaiah Targum: Introduction, Translation, Apparatus and Notes. The Aramaic Bible: the Targums. Vol. 11. Edinburgh: T&T Clark. ISBN 978-0-89453-480-5. OCLC 489964184.
- ——— (1986). Beginning of the New Testament Study. London: SPCK. ISBN 978-0-281-04210-4. OCLC 1056596986.
- ——— (1992). The Temple of Jesus: His Sacrificial Program within a Cultural History of Sacrifice. University Park, PA: Pennsylvania State University Press. ISBN 978-0-271-00824-0. OCLC 231443891.
- ———; Neusner, Jacob (1995). Judaism in the New Testament: Practices and Beliefs. London & New York: Routledge. ISBN 978-0-415-11844-6. OCLC 876035014.
- ——— (1997). Pure Kingdom: Jesus Vision of God. Studying the historical Jesus. London & Grand Rapids, MI: SPCK Publishing & Eerdmans. ISBN 978-0-281-05060-4. OCLC 34974144.
- ——— (2002). Redeeming Time: The Wisdom of Ancient Jewish and Christian Festal Calendars. Peabody, MA: Hendrickson Publishers. ISBN 978-1-56563-380-3. OCLC 840108072.
- ———; Flesher, Paul V. M. (2011). The Targums: a critical introduction. Waco, TX: Baylor University Press. ISBN 978-90-04-21817-8. OCLC 769189749.
- ——— (2014). A Galilean Rabbi and His Bible: Jesus' Use of the Interpreted Scripture of His Time. Eugene, OR: Wipf & Stock. ISBN 978-1-62564-270-7. OCLC 864442889. - republication of the 1984 title
- ——— (2021). The Herods: Murder, Politics, and the Art of Succession. Minneapolis: Fortress Press. ISBN 978-1-5064-7428-1. OCLC 1250200867.
- ——— (2026). Berenice: Queen in Roman Judea. New Haven & London: Yale University Press. ISBN 978-0-3002-7425-7.

=== Edited by ===
- ———; Neusner, Jacob, eds. (2001). The Brother of Jesus: James the Just and His Mission. Louisville KY & London: Westminster John Knox Press. ISBN 978-0-664-22299-4. OCLC 717948760.
- ———; Neusner, Jacob, eds. (2005). Altruism in World Religions. Washington, D.C.: Georgetown University Press. ISBN 978-1-58901-065-9. OCLC 475595328.
- ———, ed. (2007). The Cambridge Companion to the Bible. Cambridge, UK: Cambridge University Press. ISBN 978-0-521-86997-3. OCLC 144222458.
- ———; Neusner, Jacob, eds. (2008). Religious Tolerance in World Religions. Templeton Foundation Press. ISBN 978-1-59947-136-5.

=== Chapters ===
- ——— (2005). "Altruism in Christianity". In ———; Neusner, Jacob (eds.). Altruism in World Religions. Washington, D.C.: Georgetown University Press. pp. 53–66. ISBN 978-1-58901-065-9. OCLC 475595328.
