= Participation in Christ =

Paul's theology is considered by some interpreters to center on a participation in Christ, in which one partakes in salvation by dying and rising with Jesus. While this theology was interpreted as mysticism by Albert Schweitzer, according to the New Perspective on Paul, as initiated by E.P. Sanders, it is more aptly viewed as a salvation theology.

== Albert Schweitzer ==
Albert Schweitzer "argued that redemption for Paul meant deliverance from hostile angelic powers and that justification by faith was but a 'subsidiary' element of his thought. For Schweitzer, the heart of Paul's theology lay in his 'mysticism': redemption takes place when one is united with Christ through baptism, thus participating (in a real, not merely metaphoric, sense) in his death and resurrection.

This "Pauline mysticism" is not about "being one with God or being in God", and sonship to God is not conceived as "an immediate mystical relation to God, but as mediated and effected by means of a mystical union with Christ". According to Schweitzer, Paul saw human beings to enter into relation with God by dying and rising with Christ, being set free from sin and the Law, and possessing the Spirit of Christ.

Paul emphasizes justification by faith in the Epistle to the Romans. Christ's death is portrayed as a sin offering, which erases sin and makes God's forgiveness possible. This "righteousness by faith" is individualistic, and it does not lead to an ethical theory.

== New Perspective on Paul ==
These views on Paul have been challenged by the so called "New Perspective on Paul", as initiated by E.P. Sanders. According to Sanders, the historical understanding of Second Temple Judaism had been incorrect, drawing a mistaken opposition between "faith" and "works". Paul's insistence on faith stems from this Second Temple Judaism, in which the covenant with God was maintained by observing the Law ("works"), but was given by God to his chosen people as an act of faith. For Paul, Jesus' death and rising were a solution to the problem of the inclusion of Gentile Torah-observers into the covenant. By definition, those Gentiles were "sinners", who could not enter the covenant by observing the Law. Yet, God had entered this evil world through Jesus, to redeem it; by faith in, or through, Jesus, and participating in his death and rising, Jews and Gentiles alike were redeemed. According to Ellen Charry,

...this participation is not union in a cosmic sense, as Schweitzer thought, but a transfer of lordship in which, by belonging to or participating in Christ, one receives forgiveness for past offences, is liberated from the powers of sin, and receives the Spirit. A consequence, but not the goal, of this participation is righteous living.

== See also ==
- Christian meditation
- Pauline Christianity
- Atonement in Christianity
- Soteriology
- Christian mysticism
