= Ben F. Meyer =

- Born: Benjamin Franklin Meyer; November 1927; Chicago, Illinois, US
- Died: 28 December 1995 (aged 68); Les Verrières, Switzerland
- Spouse: Denise Meyer

Academic background
- Education: Pontifical Gregorian University
- Influences: Bernard Lonergan

Academic work
- Discipline: Religious studies; theology
- Institutions: Alma College; McMaster University
- Notable works: The Aims of Jesus (1979)
- Influenced: Bruce Chilton; N. T. Wright

Benjamin Franklin Meyer (1927–1995) was a theologian and scholar of religion. Born in November 1927 in Chicago, Illinois, he studied with the Jesuits, his studies taking him to California, Strasbourg, Göttingen, and Rome, where he received his doctorate from the Pontifical Gregorian University in 1965. He taught briefly at Alma College and at the Graduate Theological Union in Berkeley before joining the faculty at McMaster University in 1969, where he taught in the religious studies department until 1992. Meyer's areas of specialization included the historical Jesus, the early expansion of the Christian movement, and the hermeneutics of Bernard Lonergan. He authored several important monographs over his 30-year career. He died on 28 December 1995 in Les Verrières, Switzerland.

Meyer's works deeply influenced major scholars, such as Bruce Chilton, N. T. Wright, John P. Meier and Ben Witherington III.

== Works ==
=== Thesis ===
- Meyer, Ben F. (1965). Christ and the Apostolic Community (Thesis). Roma: Pontificia Universitas Gregoriana. OCLC 45132128.

=== Books ===
- Meyer, Ben F. (1971). The Church in Three Tenses. Garden City, NY: Doubleday. OCLC 135021.
- ——— (1979). The Aims of Jesus. London: SCM Press. ISBN 978-0-334-00027-3. OCLC 4760225.
- ——— (1986). The Early Christians: their world mission and self-discovery. Good News Studies. Vol. 16. Wilmington, DE: Glazier (Michael) Inc. ISBN 978-0-8146-5542-9. OCLC 13998055.
- ——— (1989). Critical Realism and the New TestamentvPrinceton Theological Monograph Series. Vol. 17. Allison Park, PA: Pickwick Publications. ISBN 978-0-915138-97-5. OCLC 18681445.
- ——— (1992). Christus Faber: the master builder and the house of God. Princeton Theological Monograph Series. Vol. 29. Allison Park, PA: Pickwick Publications. ISBN 978-1-55635-014-6. OCLC 25093369.
- ——— (1994). Five Speeches that Changed the World. Collegeville, MN: Liturgical Press. ISBN 978-0-8146-2282-7. OCLC 29465963.
- ——— (1994). Reality and Illusion in New Testament Scholarship: a primer in critical realist hermeneutics. Collegeville, MI: Glazier/Liturgical. ISBN 978-0-8146-5771-3. OCLC 31610448.

=== Edited by ===
- ———, ed. (1993). One Loaf, One Cup: Ecumenical Studies of 1 Cor 11 and Other Eucharistic Texts. New Gospel Studies. Vol. 6. Macon, GA: Mercer University Press. ISBN 978-0-86554-398-0. OCLC 24380520.

== See also ==
- John Dominic Crossan
