= Journal for the Study of the New Testament =

- Discipline: New Testament
- Language: English
- Edited by: Olegs Andrejevs

Publication details
- History: 1978-present
- Publisher: SAGE Publications (United States)
- Frequency: 5/year

Standard abbreviations
- ISO 4: J. Study New Testam.

Indexing
- ISSN: 0142-064X (print); 1745-5294 (web)
- OCLC no.: 937350279

Links
- Journal homepage; Online access; Online archive

The Journal for the Study of the New Testament is a peer-reviewed academic journal that publishes papers five times a year in the field of Biblical studies. It is founded by Bruce Chilton. The journal's current editor is Olegs Andrejevs (Loyola University Chicago). It was previously edited by Jennifer Strawbridge (University of Oxford), Jane Heath (Durham University), Louise Lawrence (University of Exeter), and Catrin Williams (University of Wales). It has been in publication since 1978 and is currently published by SAGE Publications.

== Scope ==
The Journal for the Study of the New Testament publishes papers on work from historical perspectives, studies using social-scientific and literary theory or developing theological, cultural, and contextual approaches. The journal aims to present a resource for scholars, teachers in the field of New Testament, postgraduate students and advanced undergraduates.

== Abstracting and indexing ==
The Journal for the Study of the New Testament is abstracted and indexed in the following databases:

- Academic Complete
- Academic Premier
- SCOPUS
- ZETOC
