= E. P. Sanders =

American biblical scholar and Christian theologian (1937–2022)

E. P. Sanders FBA
- Born: Ed Parish Sanders; April 18, 1937; Grand Prairie, Texas, U.S.
- Died: November 21, 2022 (aged 85)
- Awards: Guggenheim Fellowship for Humanities

Academic background
- Education: Texas Wesleyan College; Southern Methodist University; Union Theological Seminary (ThD)
- Thesis: The Tendencies of the Synoptic Tradition (1969)
- Doctoral advisor: W. D. Davies
- Influences: David Daube; Jacob Nahum Epstein; Albert Schweitzer; Morton Smith

Academic work
- Discipline: Biblical studies; Christian theology
- Sub-discipline: New Testament studies
- Institutions: Queen's College, Oxford; Duke University
- Doctoral students: Adele Reinhartz
- Main interests: Early Christianity; Hellenistic period; Historical Jesus; Second Temple Judaism
- Notable works: Paul and Palestinian Judaism (1977); Jesus and Judaism (1985); The Historical Figure of Jesus (1993)
- Notable ideas: New Perspective on Paul
- Influenced: James D. G. Dunn

Ed Parish Sanders FBA (April 18, 1937 – November 21, 2022) was an American New Testament scholar and Protestant theologian, regarded as the main proponent of the "New Perspective on Paul". He was a major scholar in the scholarship on the historical Jesus and contributed to the view that Jesus was part of a renewal movement within Judaism. He was Arts and Sciences Professor of Religion at Duke University, North Carolina from 1990 until his retirement in 2005.

Sanders was a Fellow of the British Academy. In 1966, he received a Doctor of Theology degree from Union Theological Seminary in New York City. In 1990, he received a Doctor of Letters degree from the University of Oxford and a Doctor of Theology degree from the University of Helsinki. He authored, co-authored, or edited 13 books and numerous articles. He received a number of prizes, including the 1990 University of Louisville and Louisville Presbyterian Theological Seminary Grawemeyer Award for the best book on religion, Jesus and Judaism (Fortress Press, 1985).

== Early life and education ==
Sanders was born on April 18, 1937, in Grand Prairie, Texas. He attended Texas Wesleyan College (now Texas Wesleyan University) (1955–1959) and Perkins School of Theology at Southern Methodist University (1959–1962). He spent a year (1962–1963) studying at Göttingen, the University of Oxford, and in Jerusalem.

Between September 1963 and May 1966, Sanders studied at Union Theological Seminary, New York City, for his Doctor of Theology degree. His thesis was titled The Tendencies of the Synoptic Tradition (published in 1969 by Cambridge University Press; reprinted by Wipf & Stock in 2000), which used form criticism to examine whether the Gospel tradition changed in consistent ways. The thesis was supervised by W. D. Davies.

== Career ==
Sanders taught at McMaster University (Hamilton, Ontario) from 1966 to 1984. In 1968, he won a fellowship from the Canada Council and spent a year in Israel, studying Rabbinic Judaism. In 1984, he became Dean Ireland's Professor of the Exegesis of Holy Scripture at the University of Oxford and a Fellow of Queen's College, positions he kept until his move to Duke University in 1990. He also held visiting professorships and lectureships at Trinity College, Dublin, and the University of Cambridge.

=== Thought and writings ===
As a biblical scholar, Sanders was known for his extensive research on the New Testament. His field of special interest was Judaism and Christianity in the Greco-Roman world. He was one of the leading scholars in contemporary historical Jesus research, the so-called "Third Quest," which places Jesus firmly in the context of Judaism. In contemporary scholarship, Jesus is seen as the founder of a "renewal movement within Judaism", to use Sanders' phrase. He promoted the view that Jesus was an apocalyptic prophet.

Sanders argued that the traditional Christian interpretation that Paul the Apostle was condemning Rabbinic legalism was a misunderstanding of both Judaism and Paul's thought, especially since it assumed a level of individualism in these doctrines that was not present, and disregarded notions of group benefit or collective privilege. Rather, Sanders argued, the key difference between pre-Christian Judaism and Pauline teaching was to be found in ideas of how a person becomes one of the People of God. Sanders termed the term "covenantal nomism": one was a member of the People by virtue of God's covenant with Abraham, and one stayed in it by keeping the Law of Moses.

Sanders claimed that Paul's belief was one of participationist eschatology: that the only way to become one of the People of God was through faith in Jesus ("dying with Christ") and that the so-called Old Covenant had been superseded. But once inside, appropriate behavior was required of the Christian, based on the Jewish scriptures, but not embracing all aspects of them. Both patterns required the grace of God for election (admission) and the individual's behavior, supported by God's grace. The dividing line, therefore, was Paul's insistence on faith in Jesus as the only way to election. However, Sanders stressed that Paul also "loved good deeds", and that when his words are taken in context, it emerges that Paul advocates good works in addition to faith in Jesus.

Sanders' next major book was Jesus and Judaism, published in 1985. In the book, he argued that Jesus began as a follower of John the Baptist and was a prophet of the restoration of Israel. Sanders saw Jesus as creating a Jewish eschatological movement through his appointment of the Twelve Apostles and his preaching and actions. After his execution (the trigger for which was Jesus overthrowing the tables in the temple court of Herod's Temple, thereby antagonizing the political authorities), his followers continued the movement, expecting his return to restore Israel. One consequence of this return would be gentiles worshiping the God of Israel. Sanders could find no substantial points of opposition between Jesus and the Pharisees, and he viewed Jesus as abiding by Jewish law and the disciples as continuing to keep it (cf. e.g., Acts 3:1; 21:23–26, for their worship in the Temple in Jerusalem). Sanders also argued that Jesus's sayings did not entirely determine Early Christian behavior and attitudes, as is shown by Paul's discussion of divorce (1 Cor. 7:10–16), where the latter quotes Jesus's sayings and then gives his own independent ruling. In one interview, Sanders stated that Paul felt that "he was the model to his churches."

Judaism: Practice and Belief was published in 1992 and tested Sanders' thesis in the light of concrete Jewish practices. Sanders argued that there was a "Common Judaism"—that is, beliefs and practices common to all Jews—regardless of which religious party they belonged to. After the reign of Salome Alexandra, the Pharisees were a small but highly respected party that wielded varying influence within Second Temple Judaism. The main source of power, however, lay with the rulers, especially the hereditary priesthood, the Sadducees. Sanders argued that the evidence indicates that the Pharisees did not dictate policy to any of these groups or individuals.

In general, Sanders stressed the importance of historical context for a proper understanding of first-century religion. He attempted to approach Judaism on its own terms, not in the context of the sixteenth-century Protestant–Catholic debates, in order to redefine views of Judaism, Paul, and Christianity as a whole. As Sanders said, he read Paul in his context: "Palestine in the first century and especially first-century Judaism." In this spirit, one of Sanders' articles is titled "Jesus in Historical Context". In a 2000 encyclopedia entry about Jesus, whom Sanders described as an "eschatological prophet", the subject avoids using the word "angel" but references two men "in dazzling clothes" at the empty tomb.

Sanders argued that more comparative studies are needed, with wider examinations of the relationship between New Testament texts and other available historical sources of the period. Speaking at a conference organized in his honor, he described the attractiveness of these types of comparative studies: "They are not all that easy, but they are an awful lot of fun."

== Death ==
Sanders died on November 21, 2022, at the age of 85.

== Selected works ==
=== Books ===
- Sanders, E. P. (1969). The Tendencies of the Synoptic Tradition (Ph.D.). Cambridge: Cambridge University Press. ISBN 0-521-07318-9.
- ——— (1977). Paul and Palestinian Judaism. London: SCM Press. ISBN 0-8006-1899-8.
- ———; Baumgarten, Albert I.; Mendelson, Alan; Meyer, Ben F., eds. (1980). Jewish and Christian Self-Definition, Volume 1: The Shaping of Christianity in the Second and Third Centuries. London: SCM Press. ISBN 978-0-3340-0818-7.
- ———; Baumgarten, Albert I.; Mendelson, Alan, eds. (1981). Jewish and Christian Self-Definition, Volume 2: Aspects of Judaism in the Graeco-Roman Period. London: SCM Press. ISBN 978-0-3340-0819-4.
- ———; Meyer, Ben F., eds. (1982). Jewish and Christian Self-Definition, Volume 3: Self-definition in the Graeco-Roman World. London: SCM Press. ISBN 978-0-3340-0822-4.
- ——— (1983). Paul, the Law, and the Jewish People. Minneapolis, MN: Augsburg Fortress Publishers. ISBN 0-8006-1878-5.
- ——— (1985). Jesus and Judaism. London: SCM Press. ISBN 0-334-02091-3.
- ———; Davies, Margaret (1989). Studying the Synoptic Gospels. London: SCM Press. ISBN 0-334-02342-4.
- ——— (1990). The Question of Uniqueness in the Teaching of Jesus (The Ethel M. Wood Lecture, 15 February 1990). London: University of London. ISBN 0-718-70961-6.
- ——— (1990). Jewish Law from Jesus to the Mishnah. London: SCM Press. ISBN 0-334-02102-2.
- ——— (1991). Paul. Oxford: Oxford Paperbacks. ISBN 0-19-287679-1.
- ——— (1992). Judaism: Practice and Belief. London: SCM Press. ISBN 0-334-02470-6.
- ——— (1993). The Historical Figure of Jesus. London: Penguin Books. ISBN 0-14-014499-4.
- ——— (2001). Paul: A Very Short Introduction. Oxford: Oxford Paperbacks. ISBN 0-19-285451-8.
- ——— (2015). Paul: The Apostle's Life, Letters, and Thought. Minneapolis, MN: Fortress Press. ISBN 978-0-80-062956-4.

=== Articles and chapters ===
- ——— (1973). "Patterns of Religion in Paul and Rabbinic Judaism: A Holistic Method of Comparison". Harvard Theological Review. 66 (4): 455–478. doi:10.1017/S0017816000018125. S2CID 170911418.
- ——— (1993). "Jesus in Historical Context". Theology Today. 50 (3): 429–448. doi:10.1177/004057369305000309. S2CID 147203393.
- ——— (1996). "Jesus' Relation to Sepphoris". In Nagy, Rebecca Martin; Meyers, Eric M.; Meyers, Carol L.; et al. (eds.). Sepphoris in Galilee: Crosscurrents of Culture. Raleigh: North Carolina Museum of Art. pp. 75–79. ISBN 978-0-8825-9971-7.
- ——— (2001). "Jesus' Galilee". In Dunderberg, Ismo; et al. (eds.). Fair Play: Diversity and Conflicts in Early Christianity: Essays in Honor of Heikki Räisänen. Novum Testamentum Supplements. Vol. 103. Leiden: Brill. pp. 3–41. ISBN 978-9-0041-2359-5.
- ——— (2010). "Jesus of Nazareth". In Collins, John J.; Harlow, Daniel C. (eds.). The Eerdmans Dictionary of Early Judaism. Grand Rapids, MI: Eerdmans. pp. ?. ISBN 978-0-8028-2549-0.

== Festschrift ==
- Udoh, Fabian E., ed. (2008). Redefining First-Century Jewish and Christian Identities: essays in honor of Ed Parish Sanders. Christianity and Judaism in Antiquity. Vol. 16. Notre Dame, IN: University of Notre Dame Press. ISBN 978-0-268-04453-4. OCLC 227031660.
