= Covenantal nomism =

Issue in Jewish theology

Covenantal nomism, in opposition to merit theology, is the belief that 1st century Jews in the land of Israel did not believe in works righteousness. Essentially, it is the belief that one is brought into the Abrahamic covenant through birth and stays in the covenant through works. It suggests that the Jewish view of relationship with God is that keeping the law is based only on a prior understanding of relationship with God.

The "structure" of covenantal nomism can be described as follows: (1) God has chosen Israel and (2) given the law. The law implies both (3) God's promise to maintain the election and (4) the requirement to obey. (5) God rewards obedience and punishes transgression. (6) The law provides for means of atonement and atonement results in (7) maintenance or re-establishment of the covenantal relationship. (8) All those who are maintained in the covenant by obedience, atonement and God's mercy belong to the group that will be saved. An important interpretation of the first and last points is that election and, ultimately, salvation are considered to be by God's mercy rather than human achievement.

== See also ==
- Christian–Jewish reconciliation
- Jesus and Judaism
- Judaism and Christianity
- Legalism (theology)
- New Perspective on Paul
