= Legalism (theology) =

Pejorative for performative Christianity

In Christian theology, "legalism" (or "nomism") is a pejorative term applied by some denominations and sects to the idea that "by doing good works or by obeying the law, a person earns and merits salvation." The term has been criticized by certain Christian traditions, such as Conservative Anabaptists who have said that being a disciple of Jesus means being obedient to New Testament commands (such as the holy kiss, baptism, communion, headcovering, and feet washing), and the same is "crucial evidence that an individual has repented, believed, and yielded to Christ."

== Overview ==
The Encyclopedia of Christianity in the United States defines legalism as a pejorative descriptor for "the direct or indirect attachment of behaviors, disciplines, and practices to the belief in order to achieve salvation and right standing before God", emphasizing a need "to perform certain deeds in order to gain salvation" (works). Additionally, legalism pejoratively refers to the view that Christians should not engage in social practices perceived as contrary to a Christian witness, such as gambling, dancing, consuming alcohol, enjoying secular entertainment, or wearing immodest clothing; abstinence from these things is found among fundamental Baptist, Conservative Anabaptist and Conservative Holiness-Methodist denominations.

What is viewed as "legalistic" may depend on the Christian denomination; in contrast to Lutheran theology that revolves around the doctrine of justification by faith, Christians of the Anabaptist tradition (who teach salvation by "faith that works") have argued that being a disciple of Jesus by careful obedience to New Testament commands (such as the holy kiss, baptism, communion, headcovering, and feet washing), is "crucial evidence that an individual has repented, believed, and yielded to Christ." The Anabaptist theologian Menno Simons rebuffed the Lutheran charge of legalism by referencing John 14:15:

Because we teach from the mouth of the Lord that if we would enter into [eternal] life, we must keep the commandments; that the love of God is that we keep his commandments, the [Lutheran] preachers call us heaven-stormers and meritmen, saying that we want to be saved by our own merits even though we have always confessed that we cannot be saved by means of anything other than by the merits, intercession, death, and blood of Christ.

Reformed commentator Anna Grace Wood stated, "If in 1 Corinthians 11, God commands the wearing of fabric head coverings in worship and we reject this teaching, we are in sin because we are rejecting the Word of God." The Christian expositor Tony Cooke, citing Philippians 2:12, has stated that the term "legalist" has been often applied incorrectly to those following biblical directives "that pertain to holiness, obedience, and living godly lives", concluding that "God's grace leads us into obedience, not away from it." In the same vein, the theologian Leonard Ravenhill summated: "When there is something in the Bible that churches don't like, they call it 'legalism'."

The Pharisees and Sadducees, as described in the Gospels, are often regarded in general by Christians as legalists. Historically, many Christian New Testament scholars attacked Judaism for supposedly being "legalistic"; this accusation has been rebutted by other scholars, such as E. P. Sanders, who identify this criticism as inaccurate and ahistorical.

Antinomianism is often regarded as the opposite of legalism, with situational ethics as a third possible position.

In 1921, Ernest De Witt Burton stated that in Gal. 2:16, the Greek word nomos was "evidently used ... in its legalistic sense, denoting divine law viewed as a purely legalistic system made up of statutes, on the basis of obedience or disobedience to which individuals are approved or condemned as a matter of debt without grace. This is divine law as the legalist defined it."

== See also ==
- Free grace theology
- Antinomian Controversy
