= August Rohling =

German Catholic theologian and polemicist (1839–1931)

- Born: 15 February 1839; Neuenkirchen, Province of Westphalia, Prussia
- Died: 23 January 1931 (aged 91); Salzburg
- Occupation: Theologian

August Rohling (15 February 1839 – 23 January 1931) was a German Catholic theologian and polemical author.

He studied at Münster and Paris, and became professor successively at the University of Münster, Milwaukee, and Charles University in Prague, retiring in 1901.

He wrote polemics against Protestantism and Judaism. Of his anti-Jewish works Der Talmudjude (Münster, 1871) became a standard work for antisemitic authors and journalists. It is a faulty abstract of the Entdecktes Judenthum of Johann Andreas Eisenmenger.

The book first appeared when Bismarck inaugurated his anti-Catholic legislation, as a retort to the attacks made by liberal journals on the dogma of papal infallibility and on Jesuitic textbooks. The book was extensively quoted by the Catholic press, but it did not become a political force until the appearance of antisemitism, and the Tiszaeszlár Affair in 1883. Franz Delitzsch defended Judaism against the attacks of Rohling. At the same time Josef Samuel Bloch wrote articles in which he accused Rohling of ignorance and of forgery of the texts. Rohling sued Bloch for libel, but withdrew the suit at the last moment. Later on he greeted the appearance of Zionism as the solution of the Jewish question and wrote a pamphlet against Güdemann's "Das Judenthum in Seinen Grundzügen," etc.

Those of Rohling's works which concern the Jews are, in addition to "Der Talmudjude":

- "Katechismus des 19. Jahrhunderts für Juden und Protestanten," Mayence, 1878
- "Franz Delitzsch und die Judenfrage," Prague, 1881
- "Fünf Briefe über den Talmudismus und das Blutritual der Juden," ib. 1881
- "Die Polemik und das Menschenopfer des Rabbinismus," Paderborn, 1883;
- "Die Ehre Israels: Neue Briefe an die Juden," Prague, 1889
- "Auf nach Zion," ib. 1901
- "Das Judenthum nach Neurabbinischer Darstellung der Hochfinanz Israels," Munich, 1903.

Of the polemical literature against Rohling the oldest work is Kroner's "Entstelltes, Unwahres und Erfundenes in dem Talmudjuden Professor Dr. August Rohling's," Münster, 1871. Distinguished by scholarship are the two pamphlets of Delitzsch, "Rohling's Talmudjude Beleuchtet" (Leipzig, 1881) and "Schachmatt den Blutlügnern Rohling und Justus" (2d ed., Erlangen, 1883).

Der Talmudjude remained a popular text well in to the 1930s. The Nazi publicist Julius Streicher drew on Rohling's arguments in his antisemitic newspaper Der Stürmer. The Catholic Church condemned this book.

== See also ==
- Criticism of the Talmud
- Elias von Cyon
- Nicholas Donin
- Anton Margaritha
- Johannes Pfefferkorn
- Samuel Friedrich Brenz
- Jacob Brafman
