= Criticism of the Talmud =

Criticism of one of Judaism's holiest books

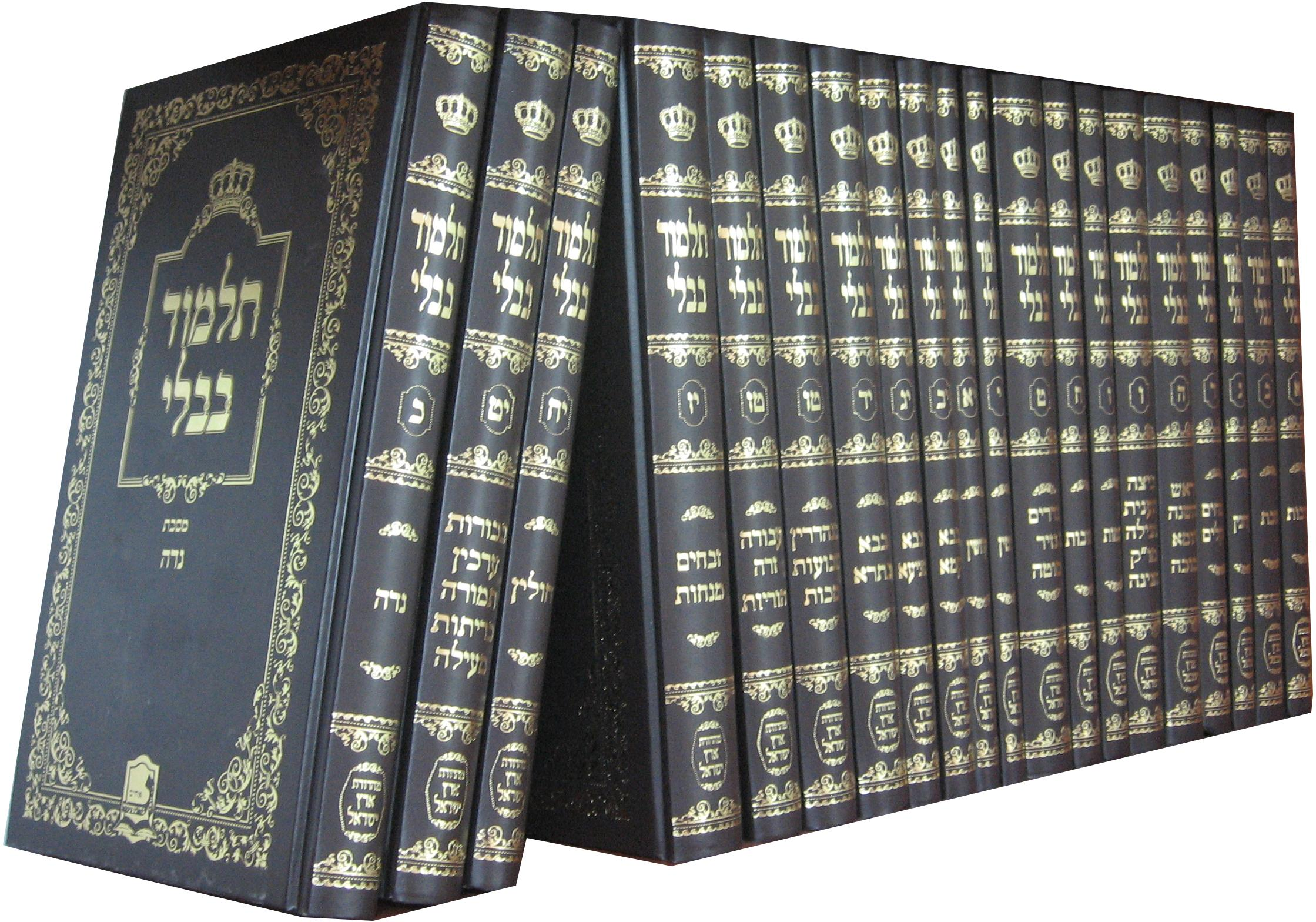
The Babylonian Talmud

Criticism of the Talmud includes criticisms and attacks on the Talmud's doctrines, laws, and authority. In his work The History of the Talmud, historian Michael Levi Rodkinson observed that critics of the Talmud "have varied in their character, objects and actions" and recorded critics and persecutors such as Anan ben David, the Karaites, Nicholas Donin, Johannes Pfefferkorn, Johann Andreas Eisenmenger, the Frankists, Denis Diderot, and August Rohling. Other critics include Elizabeth Dilling, Justinas Pranaitis, Israel Shahak, and Uriel DaCosta.

Some criticisms are based on quotations from the Talmud that are taken out of context, and are misleading because clarifying information is omitted.

Historian Heinrich Graetz states that many of the faults of the Talmud are because it contains a vast amount of material, compiled by a large number of authors: "[m]ore than six centuries lie petrified in the Talmud.... Small wonder, then, that if in this world the sublime and the common, the great and the small, the grave and the ridiculous, the altar and the ashes, the Jewish and the heathenish, be discovered side by side. The expressions of ill-will, which are seized upon with such avidity by the enemies of the Jews, were often nothing but the utterance of momentary ill-humor, which escaped from the teacher, and were caught up and embodied In the Talmud by over-zealous disciples, unwilling to lose a single word let fall by the revered sages. They are amply counterbalanced, however, by the doctrines of benevolence and love of all men without distinction of race or religion, which are also preserved in the Talmud."

== History of criticism ==
Early criticisms of the Oral Torah (which was later codified in the Talmud) were made by the Sadducees, a sect of Judaism (circa 200 BCE to 100 CE), which rejected the Oral Torah, which at that time was an oral version of religious laws maintained by a competing sect, the Pharisees. Later, in the 8th century, the Karaites sect of Judaism emerged and similarly rejected the Talmud's religious authority, which by that time had been committed to writing.

Early Christian criticisms of the Talmud occurred during the Middle Ages during disputations arranged by the Christian church, designed to convert Jews to Christianity by proving that Christianity was superior to Judaism. In the 16th to 18th centuries, Christian polemicists such as Johannes Pfefferkorn and Johann Eisenmenger wrote several books and pamphlets critical of the Talmud in an effort to demonstrate the superiority of Christianity.

Jewish intellectual Uriel da Costa criticized the Talmud in the 17th century, claiming that it was flawed and not divinely inspired. During the French Enlightenment, European commentators such as Denis Diderot criticized the Talmud for its confused mixture of principles that lead to fanaticism and blind respect for authority.

In the 19th century, August Rohling and Justinas Pranaitis were Christian antisemitic authors that wrote books attacking the Talmud, based on Eisenmenger's previous work. From the 18th onward, the Jewish Enlightenment and reformers of Judaism criticized the Talmud as outdated and overly legalistic, as part of a broader effort to modernize Judaism and facilitate assimilation into Christian-dominated societies.

In the twentieth century, antisemitic authors such as Elizabeth Dilling and David Duke wrote books attacking the Talmud. Other modern criticisms of the Talmud are promulgated by religious Jews who view the Talmud as discriminatory, flawed, non-binding, or incompatible with modern society.

The Anti-Defamation League reports that criticisms of the Talmud are continuing in the modern era, and issued a report in 2003 stating that "there has been a renewal of attacks on Judaism and Jews through recycling of old accusations and distortions about the Talmud. Anti-Talmud tracts were originally developed in the Middle Ages as Christian polemics against Judaism, but today they emanate from a variety of Christian, Moslem and secular sources. Sometimes such 'studies' have blatantly anti-Semitic tones; sometimes they are more subtle. Yet all of them remain as false and pernicious today as they did in the Middle Ages."

=== Sadducees and Karaite Judaism ===
Historian Michael Levi Rodkinson states that early critics were the Sadducees, a sect of Judaism extant during the era 200 BCE to 100 CE. The Sadducees rejected the Oral Torah (later codified in the Talmud) which the Pharisees claimed to be a continuously passed down oral tradition which Moses received on Mount Sinai as a companion and elucidation of the written Torah (first five books of the Jewish Bible). Instead the Sadducees insisted on strict literal interpretation of the written Torah.

Anan ben David thought that the Talmud was not a holy work, and that Jews should only treat the Torah (Jewish bible) as their guiding religious text. Historian Rodkinson wrote: "[t]hen [ben David] publicly began to make war on the Talmud […] and became the head of all its opponents and ill-wishers. [...] His hatred of the Talmud become so great that he said that if he could have swallowed the Talmud, he would cast himself into a lime-kiln, that it might be burned with him and leave no vestige of its existence. Thus the people of Israel separated itself then into two hostile hosts […] the Talmudists […] and the Karaites."

The Karaite sect of Judaism, originating in the 7th or 8th centuries, also rejects the divine authority of the Talmud. Karaite Judaism may have originated from vestiges of the Sadducees, or perhaps independently from Jewish leaders such as Anan ben David. Karaite Judaism, which originated approximately during the era of Anan ben David, maintains that all of the divine commandments handed down to Moses by God were recorded in the written Torah, without additional Oral Law or explanation. As a result, Karaite Jews do not accept as binding the written collections of the Oral tradition in the Mishnah or Talmud. Historian Rodkinson writes "… the Karaites made it their great aim to drive the Talmud out of existence." Karaite Judaism continues to be practiced to the present day.

=== Middle Ages ===
During the Middle Ages a series of debates on Judaism and the Talmud were staged by the Christian church, including the Disputation of Paris, the Disputation of Barcelona, and Disputation of Tortosa. The primary purpose of the disputations was not to debate the relative merits of Judaism versus Christianity, but rather to prove to Jews that Christianity superseded Judaism, and to convince Jews to convert to Christianity.

==== Nicholas Donin and the Disputation of Paris in 1240 ====
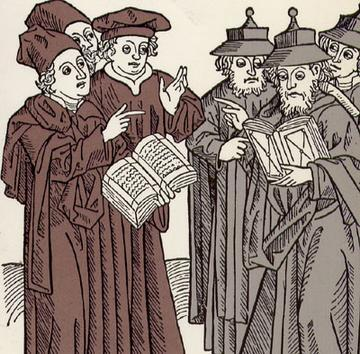
Disputation between Jewish and Christian scholars, woodcut, Johann von Armssheim, 1483

The Disputation of Paris in 1240, during the reign of Louis IX of France (St. Louis), between a member of the Franciscan Order Nicholas Donin (who earlier converted from Judaism and persuaded Pope Gregory IX to issue a bill ordering the burning of the Talmud) and four of the most distinguished rabbis of France: Yechiel of Paris (also spelled Jehiel), Moses of Coucy, Judah of Melun, and Samuel ben Solomon of Château-Thierry.

Donin cited a Talmudic expression from Shimon bar Yochai, who lived during the Bar Kochba Revolt, "The best of gentiles shall you kill." which refers to the fact that even the best of gentiles joined Pharaoh's troops during the Exodus, so it is forbidden to pity them. The context is foreign soldiers in times of war or the Messianic Age, not a general allowance to kill gentiles. Some messianic Jews in France believed the Redemption would occur in 1240, the year of the trial, so Donin tied it to a motive of messianic fervor and argued that therefore Jews would literally murder gentiles according to his interpretation of the Talmud and of Jewish messianism. Rabbi Yehiel pointed out that this statement referred to pagan Romans, not Christians, and that Talmudic laws against idolaters, such as a prohibition of trade, were not observed regarding Christians. He noted this statement referred to wartime, and reminded the trial of the Ten Commandments' prohibition against killing.

Rabbi Yehiel pointed out that the Talmud used hyperbole so could not be taken so literally.

==== Pablo Christiani and the Disputation of Barcelona in 1263 ====
The Disputation of Barcelona was held in 1263 at the royal palace of King James I of Aragon in the presence of the King, his court, and many prominent ecclesiastical dignitaries and knights, between Dominican Friar Pablo Christiani, a convert from Judaism to Christianity, and Rabbi Nachmanides. The disputation was organized by Raymond de Penyafort, the superior of Christiani and the confessor of King James. Christiani had been preaching to Jews of Provence. This disputation was relatively brief, lasting only four days.

At the Barcelona disputation, the rabbis were given more freedom than at the Paris disputation to defend the Talmud and Judaism. The focus of this disputation was an attempt to prove that Christianity was a true faith, and Jesus was the messiah.

This disputation did not result in the burning or destruction of copies of the Talmud, but in 1264 Clement IX ordered the Franciscans and Dominicans to confiscate and censor some copies of the Talmud. One of the Dominican friars that reviewed the Talmud in 1264 was Raymond Marti. In March 1264, he was commissioned to examine the Hebrew manuscripts and books which the Jews, by order of the king, were to submit to them, and to cancel passages deemed offensive to the Christian religion. Raymond Marti subsequently wrote two books that criticized the Talmud: Capistrum Judaeorum (The Harness of the Jews), and Pugio Fidei. Of the criticisms published by Marti, "some are true, most are false and based on quotations taken out of context, and some are total fabrications."

==== Geronimo de Santa Fe and the Disputation of Tortosa in 1413–1414 ====
The Disputation of Tortosa was held in the years 1413–1414 in the city of Tortosa, Spain. Geronimo de Santa Fe – a convert to Christianity from Judaism – was a primary disputant on the side of the Church, and he wanted to prove from the Talmud that the Messiah had already come in the person of Jesus. Toward this end, he induced Pope Benedict XIII, whose physician he was, to arrange a public disputation with learned Jews.

This disputation had 68 sessions, and was the longest of the disputations. Every day of the disputation, groups of Jews who wanted to be baptized were led into the assembly hall and baptized. The Pope gave instructions by which all books of the Talmud would be handed over to his functionaries for censorship. He issued a bull on this 1415, but it never went into effect because he was deposed by the Council of Constance. There was no destruction of the Talmud as a result of the Disputation of Tortosa.

=== 16th to 18th centuries ===
==== Johannes Pfefferkorn ====
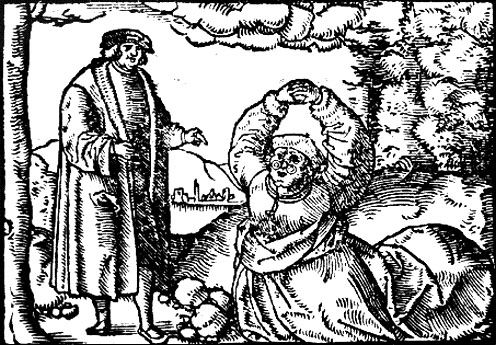
Illustration showing the humanist Johannes Reuchlin (kneeling) and wringing his hands while Johannes Pfefferkorn stands by him in a master's robes. Woodcut, Cologne 1521

Johannes Pfefferkorn (1469–1523) was a German Catholic theologian and writer who converted from Judaism. Pfefferkorn actively preached against the Jews and attempted to destroy copies of the Talmud, and engaged in a long running pamphleteering battle with Johann Reuchlin.

Pfefferkorn wrote a variety of books and pamphlets attacking Jews in general, and the Talmud specifically, including Der Judenspiegel, in which he wrote "All this [evil character of the Jews] is due to the Talmud, which is the source of all evil, and which the Jews hold in greater reverence than the ten commandments of God." He later wrote Warnungsspiegel, in which he wrote "The causes which hinder the Jews from becoming Christians are three: first, usury; second, because they are not compelled to attend Christian churches to hear the sermons; and third, because they honor the Talmud."

In 1510 Pfefferkorn urged Emperor Maximilian to confiscate copies of the Talmud and burn them. Pfefferkorn himself confiscated some copies of the Talmud in Magdeburg. As a result of a lengthy and prolonged debate between Pfefferkorn (and his supporters, the Dominicans) with Johann Reuchlin over whether Talmud should be tolerated or not, the conflict spread over Germany. Reuchlin defended the Talmud, saying "If the Talmud contains errors, let us render them innocuous by studying to sift the chaff from the grain. Do not burn the Talmud, but read it."

In 1516 Pope Leo X finally interceded, and decided in favor of preserving copies of the Talmud, which led to the first printed edition of the Babylonian Talmud – the Bomberg edition – which was published in 1520 in Venice. In 1550, the Talmud was placed in the Church's Index of Forbidden Books, and in 1564 the Church said the Talmud could be distributed only if passages hostile to Christianity were removed. This led to the Basel edition, published between 1579 and 1581, which was censored (contrasted to the 1520 Bomberg edition, which was not).

==== Uriel da Costa ====
Uriel DaCosta (c. 1585 – April 1640) was a Jewish philosopher and skeptic from Portugal. Upon arriving in the Netherlands, DaCosta very quickly became disenchanted with the kind of Judaism he saw in practice there. He came to believe that the rabbinic leadership was too consumed by ritualism and legalistic posturing. In 1616 DaCosta published his Propostar contra a Tradicao ("proposal against the tradition"), a set of ten theses attacking the validity the Talmud and asserting "the vanity and invalidity of the traditions and ordinances of the Pharisees."

Rabbi Samuel da Silva, a contemporary of DaCosta, wrote that DaCosta believed that "[t]he Oral Law [the Talmud] is lies and falsehoods, that the written law does not need any such explication, and that he and others like him can provide it. He affirms that the laws by which Israel was governed and still governs itself were entirely the invention of ambitious and evil men … He claims that all of Israel practices a strange cult that he intends to destroy." Da Silva also said that DaCosta rejected circumcision, phylacteries, prayer shawls, and mezuzot.

A specific error introduced by the Talmud, according to DaCosta in his 1623 book Treatise on Immortality, was that the soul is immortal. DaCosta claimed that the law of God (the written Torah) shows that the soul is mortal, and that the Talmud introduced a falsehood by suggesting that the soul is immortal. DaCosta's book became very controversial and was burned publicly. DaCosta was called before the rabbinic leadership of Amsterdam for uttering blasphemous views against Judaism and Christianity. He was fined a significant sum and excommunicated.

In 1624 DaCosta published Examination of the Pharisaic Traditions which was "an assault on the oral tradition" and which questioned the fundamental idea of the immortality of the soul. DaCosta believed that this was not an idea deeply rooted in biblical Judaism, but rather had been formulated primarily by rabbis. The book identified discrepancies between biblical Judaism and Rabbinic Judaism, and declared the latter to be an accumulation of mechanical ceremonies and practices. In his view, the Talmud was thoroughly devoid of spiritual and philosophical concepts.

==== Johann Andreas Eisenmenger ====
Johann Andreas Eisenmenger (1654–1704) was a German Orientalist and author of the book Entdecktes Judenthum (published in 1700; title translated into English as Judaism Unmasked). He worked on Judaism Unmasked for 19 years, and translated over 200 Hebrew, Yiddish, Arabic, and Greek sources, including fables, obscure and neglected works. Eisenmenger's translations were scrupulous and generally accurate and his criticism of the Talmud was more comprehensive and detailed than any prior critic. Many subsequent critics of the Talmud used quotations from Judaism Unmasked to support their criticisms. This pseudoscientific work interprets Jewish texts in ways that diverge considerably from the ways Jews themselves interpret them.

Eisenmenger's goal was to persuade Jews to convert to Christianity, and he believed that Jews were blind to the truth of Christian doctrines, and that they regularly blasphemed and insulted Christianity. Examples of criticisms in the book are: "that Jews said Christians had no souls, called Christ 'the uncircumcised God' and sought the ruin of non-Jews; Jews swore false oaths, killed children who converted, tested experimental remedies on Christians, and sold them spoiled meat."

Eisenmenger translated the Talmud mostly accurately, but he interpreted it literally, and did not apply the nuanced interpretations that were traditionally employed by Rabbinical scholars. Eisenmenger presented passages from the Talmud out of their original textual or historical contexts. Some scholars have gone as far as calling his work a fabrication, it being riddled with intentional distortions and errors. Some suggest the translations themselves were manipulated. Historian Alan Steinweis suggests Eisenmenger "seized upon utterances of ancient rabbis that originated as tactical debating maneuvers and misinterpreted them as statements of Jewish doctrine. Similarly, [he] pointed to unflattering Talmudic characterizations of Gentiles as proof of Jewish disdain for non-Jews, ignoring the circumstances of persecution and oppression that gave rise to such rabbinical polemics. [He] selected only those Talmudic passages that cast Jews in a negative light, and omitted contradictory passages that might have softened the harsh portrait."

As Katz notes, while Eisenmenger knew Hebrew, Aramaic, and Arabic, and quoted sources and traanslated them to German, he mischaracterized the Jewish attitudes of the time. Talmud contains opposing opinions on many issues. To someone knowledgeable about Jewish literature, Eisenmenger's portrayal would be structurally familiar but almost like a parody. His extremist theses include believing in literal blood libels and well poisoning. His views were representative of mainstream medieval Christian attitudes. Some translations were erroneous or intentionally distorted, as noted by Zvi Avneri in the Encyclopedia Judaica, who speculates he may not have believed what he wrote and was willing to solicit a payment not to publish. He failed to recognize where passages were not to be taken literally, contradicted elsewhere, or no longer considered binding. Although he knew passages about violence to idolaters didn't apply to the Noahide Christians, he nonetheless claimed Jews were doing harm to Christians due to these quoted texts. Sacha Stern notes that while his quotations are generally reliable, his translations and interpretations aren't, and that Jewish prejudices toward non-Jews in the Late Antique were not unique and can be compared with other groups such as Greeks, and that by the Middle Ages, Talmudic scholars had unanimously ruled that these views pertained to ancient pagans and no longer applied.

==== Jacob Frank and the Frankists ====
Two disputations took place in Poland in 1756–1757, between rabbinic Jews and the Frankists, which were a Jewish sect led by Jacob Frank that followed the teachings of self-proclaimed messiah Sabbatai Zevi and the mystical Jewish text the Zohar. The disputations were arranged by local Christian leaders, and were argued by 30 rabbinical rabbis and by 30 Frankists. The Frankists claimed that the Talmud was "profane" and "all vanity." The Catholic bishop of Kamenetz-Podolsk, Dembovsky, after hearing arguments from both sides, decided in favor of the Frankists, and ordered the rabbinical community to pay a fine to their opponents and to burn all copies of the Talmud in the bishopric of Podolia. But Dembovsky soon died, and his successor Labinsky, reversed the ruling and the Frankists were humiliated.

==== Denis Diderot and the French Enlightenment ====
Historian Arthur Hertzberg states that the French Enlightenment was the source of many modern antisemitic attitudes, including anti-Talmud views. French scholar and author Denis Diderot (1713–1784) – editor of the French Encyclopédie – criticized the Talmud in articles he wrote for the Encyclopédie, particularly the article on Jewish philosophy. Hertzberg writes "[Diderot] found that there was nothing good in [the Talmud] and that the Talmud regarded Christians as beasts, whom one can kill and rob. Historian Leon Schwartz writes that Diderot thought that the Talmud "was full of nonsense and the exoteric philosophy of the Jews is called a confused mixture of principles that lead to fanaticism and blind respect for authority … Singled out for the harshest treatment is the Talmud and its place in Jewish philosophy is deprecated. Diderot deplores the 'blind obeisance' paid to it by the Jews and enumerates some of its absurdities and pernicious teachings."

Zalkind Hourwitz was a Polish Jew active in the intellectual debates surrounding the French revolution, and who, according to Hertzberg, "was a bitter enemy of the Talmud and particularly of the rabbis. He asked that the rabbis be denied any authority to discipline those Jews who did not observe the traditional rituals. [Hourwitz believed that] the Talmud had acted to cut Jews off from the world and the hold of its legislation upon them had to be broken… Commenting on the custom enjoined by the Talmud that Jewish dead are to be buried on the very day of the death … Hourwitz wrote that 'it is quite probable that this homicidal custom was introduced by some rabbi who was a poisoner, in order to hide his crime from the law'."

=== Nineteenth century ===
==== August Rohling ====
August Rohling (1839–1931) was a German Catholic theologian, scholar of Hebrew archeology, and polemical author. He distinguished himself by polemics against Protestantism and Judaism. His book Der Talmudjude is a faulty abstract of the Entdecktes Judenthum of Johann Andreas Eisenmenger, yet became a standard work for anti-Semitic authors and journalists. A later antisemitic work of Rohling was the book Judenspiegel.

Several contemporaries of Rohling, including Hermann Strack and Joseph Samuel Bloch refuted Rohling's attacks on the Talmud, and showed that many of his quotations from the Talmud were fabrications.

==== Justinas Pranaitis ====
Justinas Pranaitis

Justinas Pranaitis (1861–1917) was a Lithuanian Catholic priest, Russian Master of Theology and Professor of the Hebrew Language at the Imperial Ecclesiastical Academy of the Roman Catholic Church in Saint Petersburg, Russia. In 1892 he published an anti-Semitic tract called The Talmud Unmasked which was based on Rohling's book Der Talmudjude. According to Anthony Julius, the work contains much that is fabricated, plagiarized, and wrongly translated. Stephen E. Atkins notes that in addition to mistranslation, many are taken out of context. Edmund Levin observes that Pranaitis was exposed as a fraud, ignorant of Semitic languages, and that the book was plagiarized from other antisemitic works, even down to typographical errors. Arthur Kurzweil notes it relies on earlier falsifications from Johann Eisenmenger and others. Ronald Modras and Ben-Zion Bokser note that he plagiarized Eisenmenger and August Rohling as well.

In 1912, Pranaitis testified in the blood libel case of Menahem Mendel Beilis in Russia. Beilis was accused of murdering a Christian child to take his blood for alleged Jewish rituals. Pranaitis was called as an expert witness to testify to the Talmudic hatred of Christians, as described in his book. His credibility rapidly evaporated, however, when the defence demonstrated his ignorance of some simple Talmudic concepts and definitions, such as hullin, erubin, to the point where "many in the audience occasionally laughed out loud when he clearly became confused and couldn't even intelligibly answer some of the questions asked by [Beilis'] lawyer". Pranaitis knew little Hebrew and could not read Aramaic, the primary language of the Talmud, at all, so was not a credible translator. In particular, journalist and historian Benzion Katz questioned him about Baba Batra, a Talmudic tractate that Pranaitis cited, phrasing if as it was a person. Pranaitis answered that he did not know without noticing the Baba Batra trick, showing he completely lacked the Talmudic expertise he claimed.

=== Jewish enlightenment and reform movement ===
During the sixteenth century, the Talmud was regarded as the supreme religious authority by the majority of Jews; and in the same century eastern Europe, especially Poland, became the seat of its study. During this era, the Bible was relegated to a secondary place, and the Jewish schools devoted themselves almost exclusively to the Talmud; so that, according to Bacher, "study" became synonymous with "study of the Talmud."

In the 17th century the Jewish Enlightenment, and later the reform movement, led by European rabbis such as Moses Mendelssohn, began to reassess the supremacy of the Talmud, partially to promote assimilation into non-Jewish society. Some members of the reform movement supported the Karaite view that the Talmud should be ignored, but the majority of the reformers continued to respect the Talmud and its traditions, while refuting the authority of its laws as strictly binding.

Reconstructionist Judaism, based on the ideas of Mordecai Kaplan, similarly treats the Talmud as not binding, but views it as a valuable cultural remnant that should be upheld unless there is reason for the contrary.

=== Twentieth century antisemitic critics ===
During the twentieth century, several antisemites published works attacking the Talmud, including Elizabeth Dilling, David Duke, and Michael Hoffman.

==== Nazi Germany ====
Several attacks on the Talmud were published in Nazi Germany, including Die Grundlagen des Talmud (The Basic Principles of the Talmud) in 1935 by Walter Fasolt.

==== Elizabeth Dilling ====
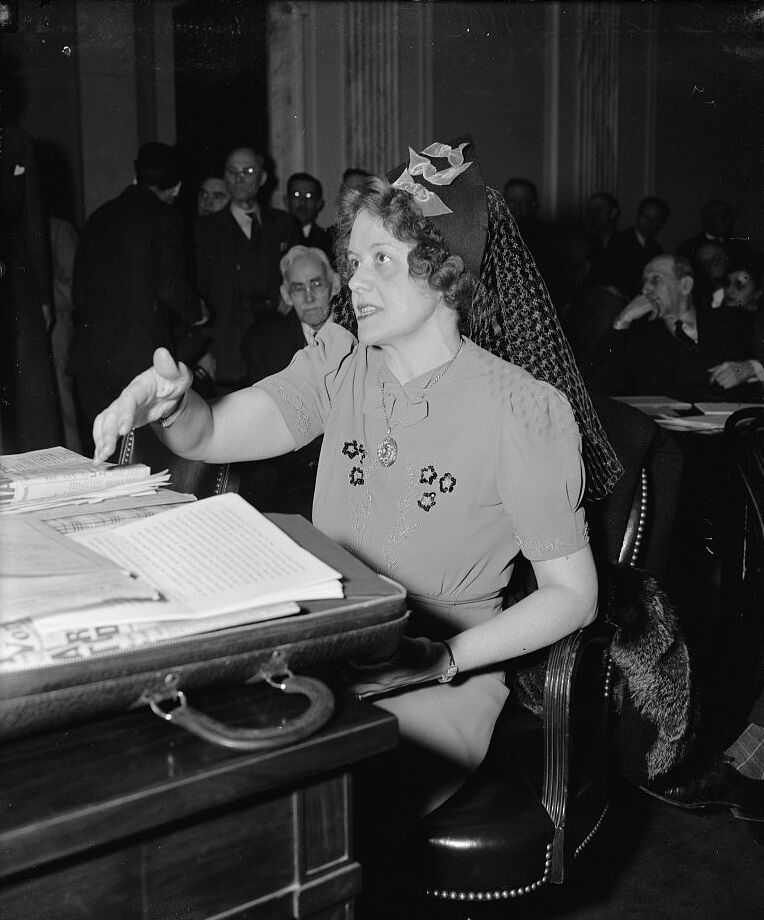
Elizabeth Dilling

Elizabeth Dilling (1894–1966) was an American activist and author who wrote The Plot Against Christianity (1954 and 1964, later re-published with the title The Jewish religion: its influence today) which enumerated many criticisms of the Talmud. The book was based on an earlier pamphlet she wrote in 1948 titled The Talmud: Religion of the entire Jewish race, whether Orthodox, Reformed or Communist. There is nothing religious in it.

Rather than rely on Eisenmenger's book Judaism Unmasked, Dilling used a 1935 English translation of the Babylonian Talmud from the Soncino publishers, and hunted for extracts which reflected negatively on Judaism. She underlined hundreds of passages she deemed immoral or offensive, and published photocopies of the annotated pages in her book.

The Anti Defamation League criticized her work in a 2003 report, stating that it was bigoted and used selective quotations to misrepresent the Talmud.

==== David Duke ====
David Duke wrote the books My Awakening (1998) and Jewish Supremacism (2003) which are widely considered to be antisemitic. David Duke drew much of his anti-Talmudic information from Elizabeth Dilling and Israel Shahak.

Abraham Foxman, president of the ADL reviewed Duke's book My Awakening in 1999, and wrote "[Duke] cites the Talmud as a text meant to assert Jewish superiority in the ancient, medieval and modern worlds. Jewish holidays, according to Duke, celebrate hate and killing" and Foxman criticized the book for being antisemitic, and using selective quotations to advance an agenda of bigotry and hatred. In a 2003 report, the ADL criticized Duke's book, claiming that his interpretation of the Talmud, in particular Sanhedrin 59a ("A heathen who pries into the Torah is condemned to death") and shows that Duke failed to incorporate additional quotations from the Talmud that put it into a broader context.

==== Michael Hoffman ====
Michael Hoffman wrote two books that criticized the Talmud: Judaism's Strange Gods (2000) and Judaism Discovered: A Study of the Anti-Biblical Religion of Racism, Self-Worship, Superstition and Deceit (2008). Hoffman argues that modern-day Jewish Orthodoxy has little or no relation to the Old Testament, but is instead based on the oral tradition as represented by the Mishnah, the Gemara and derivative rabbinic halacha. The Anti Defamation League criticized Hoffman's interpretation of the Talmud in a 2003 report.

=== Modern Jewish critics ===
Jewish historian Heinrich Graetz (1817–1891) identified several "faults" with the Talmud in his book History of the Jews, although he wrote that the faults "are amply counterbalanced, however, by the doctrines of benevolence and love of all men without distinction of race or religion, which are also preserved in the Talmud. As a counterpoise to the wild superstitions, there are severe warnings against superstitious heathen practices, to which a separate section is devoted."

Israel Shahak (1933–2001), a Jewish Holocaust survivor, wrote Jewish History, Jewish Religion: The Weight of Three Thousand Years (1994), which includes a number of criticisms of the Talmud. The book was widely condemned as antisemitic by many Jewish reviewers. Alan Dershowitz claimed that Shahak's interpretations of the Talmud, specifically Shahak's claim that a "basic Talmudic principle is that [non-Jewish] lives must not be saved, although it is forbidden to murder them outright", were flawed and reflected Shahak's "abysmal ignorance of the complex teachings of the Talmud." The Anti Defamation League criticized Shahak in a 2003 report, focusing on Shahaks claims that the Talmud views non-Jews as "subhuman species deserving only hatred and contempt from its Jewish superiors." Werner Cohn writes that "Shahak specializes in defaming the Talmud. In fact, he has made it his life's work to popularize the anti-Talmud ruminations of the 18th century German antisemite, Johann Eisenmenger."

Daat Emet (Hebrew for "knowledge, truth") is a Jewish organization that publishes essays challenging the Orthodox Jewish interpretations of the Babylonian Talmud, particularly those of Haredi Judaism. Daat Emet was founded by Yaron Yadan, a former ultra-Orthodox Jew who believes that much of the Babylonian Talmud was not written by God, but instead was written by people, and that the Talmud does not need to be strictly followed because its guidance is not correct in all circumstances.

=== Modern Arab polemics ===
Following the creation of the state of Israel, surrounding Islamic nations became the source of antisemitic polemics criticizing the Talmud. Examples include The Talmud, the Law of Israel published in 1957 in Egypt (based on Rohling's works), Israel, the Enemy of Africa, published by the Egyptian Ministry of Information (year unknown), and Talmudic Human Sacrifices published in 1962 by Egyptian government

=== Antisemitic canards ===
Some criticisms, particularly those of antisemitic critics, are based on quotations that are taken out of context, and thus misrepresent the meaning of the Talmud's text. Sometimes the misrepresentation is deliberate, and other times simply due to an inability to grasp the subtle and sometimes confusing narratives in the Talmud. Some quotations provided by antisemitic critic deliberately omit passages in order to generate quotations that appear to be offensive or insulting. Some antisemitic criticisms of the Talmud also impugn Jews in general, and are antisemitic canards.

== Criticism and responses ==
Criticism of the Talmud arose from a variety of sources: the Karaite denomination of Judaism, medieval Christians attempting to persuade Jews to convert, the Reform movement of Judaism, atheistic skeptics, and virulent attacks by Christian and Islamic antisemites. Criticisms described by Michael Levi Rodkinson, Yehoshafat Harkabi, Gil Student, Abram S. Isaacs, Wilhelm Bacher, the ADL, Dan Cohn-Sherbok, Heinrich Graetz, and Hyam Maccoby include allegations that the Talmud:

- Deviates from or supersedes the Bible
- Is not a divine work
- Contains absurd or sexually immoral content
- Is superstitious
- Endorses child molestation
- Views women as inferior to men
- Prohibits non-Jews from studying the Talmud
- Insults Jesus and his mother Mary
- Treats non-Jews as inferior to Jews
- Punishes non-Jews more severely than Jews for ox-goring incidents
- Treats non-Jews as non-human
- Permits Jews to leave non-Jews to die
- Does not punish Jews for murdering non-Jews
- States that gentiles are habituated to adultery, bestiality, and homosexuality
- States that Jews may not drink wine touched by a gentile
- Permits Jews to lie to non-Jews
- Permits Jews to steal from non-Jews

Some criticisms, particularly those of antisemitic critics, are based on quotations that are taken out of context, and thus misrepresent the meaning of the Talmud's text. Sometimes the misrepresentation is deliberate, and other times simply due to an inability to grasp the subtle and sometimes confusing narratives in the Talmud. When the quotations are interpreted in the proper context, and with appreciation of other portions of the Talmud that bear on the same subject, the quotations rarely carry the meaning ascribed by the original critic.

=== Deviates from or supersedes Biblical doctrines ===
Hyam Maccoby, Michael Levi Rodkinson, and Heinrich Graetz describe a criticism leveled by Jewish and Christian critics: that the Talmud contradicts the doctrines of the Jewish Bible and that adherents of the Talmud attach more importance to the Talmud than to the Jewish Bible. In the 1240 Disputation of Paris, Nicholas Donin argued that the Talmud should be destroyed because it served as a rival to the Bible, and following that disputation, Pope Innocent IV said "[Jews] manifest no shame for their guilt, … Omitting or condemning the Mosaic Law and the Prophets, they follow certain traditions of their elders … In Hebrew they call them the 'Thalamuth' [Talmud], and an immense book it is, exceeding the text of the Bible in size … yet this is what they teach and feed their children … and render them totally alien to the Law and the Prophets." A passage from the Talmud that has been cited in this context is Eruvim 21b "My son, be more careful in [the observance of] the words of the Scribes [the Talmud] than in the words of the Torah, for in the laws of the Torah there are positive and negative precepts; but, as to the laws of the Scribes, whoever transgresses any of the enactments of the Scribes incurs the penalty of death."

Jewish intellectual Uriel DaCosta wrote "It is by itself enough to cause the destruction of the Torah [first five books of the Jewish Bible] if one says we should interpret the ordinances of the Torah according to oral reports and that we must believe in these reports as we believe in the Torah of Moses itself. By holding them to be true, we thereby create changes in the Torah and, in fact, create a new Torah opposing the real one. [But] it is impossible that a verbal Torah exists … It would make the word of man equal to that of God to say that we are obliged to keep all the laws of the Talmud just as we are to keep the Torah of Moses"

The reform movement in Judaism was a reaction to, among other things, the perceived supremacy of the Talmud.

An example of how Christians perceived the Talmud's position in Judaism was the statement by Christian historian Augustin Calmet, who wrote: "The Jews even prefer the authority of the Talmud to that of Scripture" and he cited the maxim that the Bible was like water, the Mishna was like wine, and the Gemara was like spiced wine (the Mishna and Gemara are portions of the Talmud).

=== Not divine and non-binding ===
Michael Levi Rodkinson describes a criticism made by Karaites, reform Jews, and atheists: that the Talmud is not a divine work, but instead is the work of humans, and that the Talmud's laws are not binding and may be discarded or re-interpreted. Baruch Spinoza and Uriel DaCosta were Jews that rejected the notion of an authoritative Oral Torah and thought the oral traditions were not always reliable or comprehensive. DaCosta claimed (in the words of a contemporary) "The Oral Law is lies and falsehoods, that the written law does not need any such explication.... He affirms that the laws by which Israel was governed and still governs itself were entirely the invention of ambitious and evil men … He claims that all of Israel practices a strange cult that he intends to destroy."

The arguments used by the Karaites to reject the authority of the Talmud (or the Oral Law upon which it is based) include:

1. The Talmud (or Oral Law) is not mentioned in the Jewish Bible
2. When God told Moses to come up to Mount Sinai to receive the tablets He said: "Come up to me into the mountain, and be there: and I will give thee tablets of stone, and a law, and commandments which I have written;" Exodus 24:12. No mention is made of the Talmud or Oral Law.
3. The Jewish Bible reports that the Torah (written bible) was lost and completely forgotten for over 50 years and only rediscovered by the Temple priests (2 Kings 22:8, 2 Chr 34:15). It is inconceivable that an Oral Law (or Talmud) could have been remembered when even the written Law was forgotten.
4. The text of the Talmud contains wording and phrasing indicative of people living in the 2nd–5th centuries CE, and does not include phrases commonly found in the Jewish Bible, such as "and the Lord spoke unto Moses saying," and "thus saith the Lord".
5. Orthodox Judaism claims that the Talmud is the official interpretation of the Torah given on Mount Sinai. Yet the Talmud contains many opinions of Rabbis who disagree with each other on many issues. The Rabbis explain that whenever there are such disagreements, "both opinions are the words of the living God". Karaites maintain that it is unreasonable to believe that God would contradict Himself.

In 1885, the members of the reform movement in the United States published the Pittsburgh Platform which included the proclamation: "We recognize in the Mosaic legislation a system of training the Jewish people for its mission during its national life in Palestine, and today we accept as binding only its moral laws, and maintain only such ceremonies as elevate and sanctify our lives, but reject all such as are not adapted to the views and habits of modern civilization."

In contrast to Karaite or reform attitudes, Rabbinic Judaism holds that the books of the Jewish Bible (Tanakh) were transmitted in parallel with an oral tradition, as relayed by the scholarly and other religious leaders of each generation. Thus, in Judaism, the "Written Instruction" comprises the Torah and the rest of the Tanakh; the "Oral Instruction" was ultimately recorded in the Talmud. The interpretation of the Oral Torah is thus considered as the authoritative reading of the Written Torah. Rabbinical Jewish law is thus not based on a literal reading of the Tanakh, but on the combined oral and written tradition.

=== Strange and bizarre topics ===
Historian Heinrich Graetz describes the criticism that "the [Babylonian] Talmud contains much that is immaterial and frivolous, of which it treats with great gravity and seriousness." Scholars Adin Steinsaltz and Hyam Maccoby have described the criticism that portions of the Talmud are bizarre or inane. Talmud scholar Adin Steinsaltz discusses what he terms "strange and bizarre" topics found in the Talmud, and points out that they, though originally deemed confusing and irrelevant, often end up forecasting important topics that are later relevant. As examples he cites the discussions of artificial insemination of women, and discussions about the nature of a beast with the head of a man. Hershey H. Friedman suggests that bizarre stories in the Talmud served several purposes: they were pedagogical tools that illustrated subtle points about a sophisticated legal issue; they made the Talmudic material more interesting to students; and they sharpened the minds by serving as brainteasers.

Christian critics have asserted that the Talmud is preoccupied with sexual topics, specifically citing a story from the Talmud about a promiscuous rabbi that had relations with many prostitutes. However, the critics fail to discuss the entire text, which is a morally instructive story that ends with the rabbi recognizing the error of his immoral lifestyle and repenting.

An example cited by some Christian critics is the text in Yebamoth 63a that asserts that Adam had sexual intercourse with all the animals in the Garden of Eden, but this is the context of discussing the book of Genesis, and explains how a female human was eventually found to be the ideal companion for Adam.

=== Superstitious ===
Historian Heinrich Graetz discusses the criticism that the Talmud suggests the "efficacy of demoniacal medicines, of magic, incantations, miraculous cures, and interpretations of dreams." Critics have also claimed that the Talmud endorses beliefs such as astrology, demons, numerology, folk remedies, and witchcraft. However, concepts of astrology, demons, angels, witches, and numerology were widespread in the Middle East during the era that the Talmud was compiled, and the superstitions contained in the Talmud are representative of widespread beliefs of that time.

=== Child molestation ===
The Anti Defamation League documented a criticism that alleges that the Talmud endorses child molestation involving children under the age of three. The text of the Talmud is from tractate Kethubot 11b: "If an adult has sex with a girl under the age of three, it is ignored, for it is like putting a finger in someone’s eye [i.e., tears may drip from the eye but there will always be more tears to replace them; so too the hymen of a girl so young may break but it will heal]." This criticism was published by Pranaitis and repeated by modern sources. However, the context of this statement is within a discussion of divorce settlements – which are higher for the wife if the wife was a virgin at the time of marriage – and that text means that if the wife was molested as a young child, she is still considered a virgin for purposes of the divorce.

Despite this, at the end of Sanhedrin 54b which discusses punishment for sexual immorality outside of divorce contexts, the comment is then made wherein it states how homosexual intercourse should be punished only if the boy is older than exactly 9 years old. This further supports this criticism as the Sanhedrin allows for another example of child molestation by not punishing homosexuality if an adult performs this act even to a boy of 9 years old exactly. This decision rules against Rabbi Shmuel's suggestion of making it again 3 years old, proving that the Talmud seeks to allow it beyond the previously established 9 years old.

=== Women viewed as inferior to men ===
Some feminists have criticized the Talmud because it discourages women from studying the Talmud and other rabbinic literature, and because it presents "a negative attitude that has denied women access to the highest cultural expression of rabbinic Judaism throughout most of Jewish history."

The Talmud's rules governing menstruation ("niddah" in Hebrew) have been criticized by feminists as treating women as filthy or polluted, at least when they are menstruating, and some feminists have concluded that the disqualification of polluted persons (men who have had contact with menstruating women) from sacred activities stamps women as a "separate and inferior entity."

However, one commentator noted that "Rabbinic commentary did not unilaterally focus on the menstruating woman as pariah. For every statement stressing defilement, danger, and impurity, [there] exists a counter-statement emphasizing respect toward women, the holiness of sexual intimacy, and the incidental benefits of sexual regulation and restraint."

Atheist Christopher Hitchens criticized the Talmud for suggesting a daily prayer (Menahot 43b) that "commands the observant one to thank his maker every day that he was not born a woman." However, the man speaking the prayer is thanking God that he has the privilege of being obligated to observe the positive commandments, and is not suggesting that women are inferior.

The Talmud contains the statement "women are lightheaded" (nashim daatan kalot in Hebrew) which has been interpreted by feminists and others to mean that women are considered intellectually inferior but other analysts conclude that it simply means that women are more sensitive than men, or that they are generally not as interested in certain intellectual pursuits.

Rabbi Arthur Segal writes that the Talmud, properly interpreted, treats women with respect and reverence, and that interpretations which treat women as subservient are flawed.

=== Contents concealed from non-Jews ===
Elisheva Carlebach Jofen, Sander Gilman, and the ADL have described a criticism that the Talmud's contents were deliberately withheld from non-Jews. The Talmud was written in Hebrew and Jewish Babylonian Aramaic, and until translations were available (the first English translation was published in 1903) very few non-Jews could read it. Much of the Talmud is now widely available on the Internet, for example at the 1935 Soncino English edition or the 1918 Rodkinson English abridgement.

During the Middle Ages, converts from Judaism to Christianity translated portions of the Talmud during the Disputations – including converts such as Nicholas Donin, Abner of Burgos, Johannes Pfefferkorn, Geronimo de Santa Fe, and Pablo Christiani. Historian Naomi Seidman wrote that – in the Middle Ages – converts from Judaism to Christianity "played a crucial role in divulging these sources, the 'hidden transcript' of the Jews, to Christian readers…. the Jews experienced Donin's translation of the Talmud for Christian ears as a profound violation, the pillage of Jewish treasure and its exposure to unfriendly eyes … A rabbinic participant in a later disputation [the Disputation of Barcelona] [spoke of Pablo] Christiani as 'one who exposes the secrets of the Torah'."

Historian Elisheva Carlebach argued that converts from Judaism to Christianity would betray Jewish secrets as a way of proving the convert's new loyalty. At the end of the Middle Ages converts "and their converters had come to believe that their transformation was not complete unless it traduced Jewish secrecy, revealing how Jewish otherness was constituted."

Historian Sander Gilman also discussed how converts such as Johannes Pfefferkorn were perceived as revealing secrets: "[h]ere was a Jew privy to the secret books of the Jews, written in their magical language, who had been converted to the truth and was now willing to reveal the Jew's secrets to the world."

Nicholas Donin and later critics of the Talmud claimed that the Jews deliberately concealed the contents of the Talmud from non-Jews. One of the rabbis representing Judaism "bitterly despised Donin as a betrayer of Jewish secrets", and asserted that the Talmud was an "open book which Christians has long been welcome to peruse."

==== Non-Jews prevented from studying Jewish law ====
The ADL documents a modern instance of criticism made by David Duke regarding a passage in Sanhedrin (59a) which states that "A heathen who studies the Torah deserves death, for it is written, Moses commanded us a law for an inheritance; it is our inheritance, not theirs". Duke and other critics such as Pranaitis, Hoffman, and Dilling, emphasize the harshness of the death penalty specified in that passage, which they contend advocates the suppression of gentile study of Talmudic texts which in turn provides evidence for the existence of offensive material within the Talmud. However, this passage is an idiom used to express indignation and is not to be taken literally. The passage is in the context of a dialectical debate between two rabbis, positing opposing, extreme views. Another passage states: "even a heathen who occupies himself with Torah study is equal to a High Priest" (Baba Kama 38a). The ADL asserts that Jewish doctrine is to spread the law of God, and the teaching of Torah to non-Jews is permitted in the majority of cases. In other seemingly innocuous instances, the Talmud also prescribes the death penalty, such as in the case of a pupil who adjudicates law in his mentor's presence. (Erubin 63a)

==== Alterations and revisions ====
Various editions of the Talmud have been altered or censored from the original text, sometimes at the insistence of the Christian authorities, and sometimes voluntarily by the editors to avoid antisemitic repercussions. Editions that were altered or censored include the Basel edition, the Vilna edition, and Rodkinsons's abridgment.

Israel Shahak and others claim that most editions of the Talmud published between the 17th to 20th century contained surreptitious alterations which changed the ostensibly sacrosanct religious text, in an effort to avoid unwanted scrutiny: "… a few of the most offensive passages were bodily removed from all editions printed in Europe after the mid-16th century. In all other passages, the expressions 'Gentile', 'non-Jew', 'stranger' … were replaced by terms such as 'idolator', 'heathen' or even 'Canaanite' …". Shahak believes that the Talmud's text should have been left intact and unaltered.

The Daat Emet organization claims that a wide variety of changes were made throughout the history of the Talmud: "The Jewish culture has a sad history of internal Jewish censorship and misinterpretation. The body of biblical scripture reached us in a reduced form, having been subjected to repeated revisions motivated by ideology; most importantly, any alternative versions have been irretrievably lost to orthodox censorship."

Jewish sociologist Baruch Kimmerling states that discrimination against non-Jews in the Talmud was "covered over and excused in various ways, due to a fear of harmful anti-Semitic reactions and anti-Jewish feelings and attitudes, by a vast amount of apologetic 'Jewish scholarship' that began with the spread of emancipations and the Jewish enlightenment movement, which tried to show the 'nice' humanistic face of Judaism to the Gentiles, even by 'censoring' the authentic holy scriptures translated for other [non-Jewish] audiences."

Modern editions published in the twentieth century have restored most of the altered or censored material.

=== Insults directed at Jesus Christ ===
Hyam Maccoby, Gil Student, and the ADL describe the criticism that the Talmud insults Jesus Christ. In the Paris disputation, Donin presented the criticism that the Talmud that contained insults directed at Jesus Christ and that criticism has been widely repeated, based on the following texts from the Talmud:

A sorcerer – Sanhedrin 43a relates the trial and execution of a sorcerer named Jesus ("Yeshu" in Hebrew) and his five disciples. The sorcerer is stoned and hanged on the Eve of Passover.

Student paying too much attention to inn-keepers wife – Sanhedrin 107 tells of a Jesus ("Yeshu") "offended his teacher by paying too much attention to the inn-keeper's wife. Jesus wished to be forgiven, but [his rabbi] was too slow to forgive him, and Jesus in despair went away and put up a brick [idol] and worshipped it."

Boiled in excrement – In Gittin 56b, 57a a story is mentioned in which Onkelos summons up the spirit of a Yeshu who sought to harm Israel. He describes his punishment in the afterlife as boiling in excrement.

"May his name and memory be blotted out" – Some critics claim that the Hebrew name Yeshu is not a short form of the name Yeshua, but rather an acrostic for the Hebrew phrase "may his name and memory be blotted out" created by taking the first letter of the Hebrew words. However, this acrostic is merely speculation, and there is no evidence that Talmudic authors created such an acrostic.

In response to these criticisms, some scholars maintain that the individuals mentioned in the stories are not Jesus Christ, because in some of the stories, the individual is not named "Yeshu" (Hebrew for Jesus), and even for those stories that use the name Yeshu, that does not necessarily mean that it was Jesus Christ, because there were many different persons named Yeshu. This was the position taken by Rabbis during the disputations, and is also the position of some modern scholars. Other scholars assert that at least some of the Talmud's references are to Jesus Christ, either to the historical individual, or to Jesus as the messiah of the Christian religion.

In many of the texts, the name of the individual is not Jesus (Yeshu or Yeoshua in Hebrew) but rather another name such as Balaam, Ben Pandira, or Ben Stada, and this makes the association with Jesus dubious. But some scholars state that the names in these stories may have been changed from Jesus to other names (such as Balaam) in later editions of the Talmud, either in order to avoid antisemitic persecution, or in response to forced censorship by the Christian authorities.

Early versions of the Talmud, before censorship, sometimes followed the name Yeoshua (Jesus) with "Ha-Notzri", a Hebrew phrase which some scholars interpret as "the Nazarene", and this has been used by some scholars and critics to conclude that the named person is Jesus Christ. Other scholars do not interpret "Ha-Notzri" as "the Nazarene", and others think that uses of "Ha-Notzri" may have been a late addition to the Talmud.

==== Insults directed at Mary ====
At the 1240 Disputation in Paris, Donin presented the allegation that the Talmud was blasphemous towards Mary, the mother of Jesus, ("Miriam" in Hebrew) and this criticism has been repeated by many Christian sources. The texts cited by critics include Sanhedrin 67a, Sanhedrin 106a, and Shabbath 104b. However, the references to Mary are not specific, and some assert that they do not refer to Jesus' mother, or perhaps refer to Mary Magdalen.

=== Discrimination against and hostility towards non-Jews ===
Hyam Maccoby, Heinrich Graetz, Jacob Neusner, and Steven Fraade discuss the criticism (from both Jewish and non-Jewish critics) that some of the Talmud's laws discriminate against non-Jews, or treat non-Jews as inferiors. An example criticism from Jewish sociologist Baruch Kimmerling is: "the abundance of ethnocentrism, hate, contempt, chauvinism, and double standards expressed toward Gentiles in the major and most authoritative and 'holy' Jewish religious scriptures … is very troubling for any person who expects from 'Judaism' the expressions of an enlightened culture. These expressions and 'laws' are quite perplexing and as a phenomenon can be labeled as 'antigentilism' (a coined neologism parallel to anti-Semitism)."

==== Historical background of discriminatory passages ====
Scholar Steven Fraade analyzes the discriminatory laws of the Talmud, and suggests that the discriminatory rules in the Talmud arose because "Israel is uniquely circumscribed by its reception and practice of the divinely authorized … rules of the Torah, whereby it is set apart from other peoples." He writes that the Talmud and other Jewish rules about dealing with non-Jews reinforce the Jewish culture's "sense of solidarity with itself and separation from others" and he points out that the Talmud and later Jewish religious texts contain ambivalent and sometimes contradictory regulations on how to interact with non-Jews.

Fraade provides three different scenarios on how the discriminatory laws were enforced in ancient times: (1) the discriminatory rules represent a theoretical position that was never put into practice; (2) They represent a minority view, but not religious law; and (3) They represent a necessary "short-term response to gentile economic or political oppression of the Jews at a very specific time and place in history."

Fraade also provides three hypotheses of how Jewish religious authorities dealt with non-Jews: (1) non-Jews have no legal standing within the Jewish world, since God's laws apply only to Jews; (2) non-Jews have their own legal rules, but those laws are not divinely revealed, and so are superseded by Jewish laws; and (3) non-Jews are part of God's world, and God revealed the laws to the Jews, and so non-Jews should be instructed to recognize the virtue of God’s laws, as contained in the Torah and Talmud.

Jacob Neusner explains the Talmud's attitude towards non-Jews as being based on the fact that God offered the Torah to other non-Israelite nations, and they refused it, and only Israel adopted the laws – and so "gentiles are responsible for their own condition" in the Talmudic view. He writes that the Talmud expresses "[t]he basic theory of gentiles, all of them assumed to be idolaters, is, first, gentiles always and everywhere and under any circumstance are going to perform an act of worship for one or another of their gods. Second, gentiles are represented as thoroughly depraved …, so they will murder, fornicate, or steal at any chance they get; they routinely commit bestiality, incest, and various other forbidden acts of sexual congress."

Rabbi Arthur Segal says that some rabbinical commentators during the Middle Ages interpreted the Talmud with some hostility towards non-Jews, giving as an example "Maimonides, in his book on the Talmud, called the Mishneh Torah, says it is a religious duty in the Talmud to 'eradicate traitors, minnim [Jewish apostates], and apikorsim [heretics]' such as … followers of Jesus." Segal hypothesizes that this anti-Christian interpretation was a way for Jewish scholars to express outrage for the "wholesale slaughter and discrimination the [Christian] Church was rendering to [Jews]" during that era of persecution.

A modern authority endorsing the Talmud's discriminatory laws is David Bar-Hayim, who argues that the distinction between Jews and non-Jews is important and should not be ignored in an effort to promote equality, because "[s]imple and clear Halachic laws, whose foundations are in the words of the Living G-d, clearly state the difference 'between the two bloods'."

==== Ox goring compensation ====
Steven Fraade and Michael Walzer discuss the disparate punishments governing compensation for ox-goring incidents – one punishment for Jews and a stricter punishment for non-Jews – found in Baba Kamma 37b which contains the instruction "[w]here an ox belonging to an Israelite has gored an ox belonging to a canaanite, there is no liability, whereas where an ox belonging to a canaanite gores an ox belonging to an israelite, whether while tam or mu'ad, the compensation is to be made in full." The ox-goring rules are analyzed in detail by scholars Steven Fraade and Michael Walzer.

==== Non-Jews as inferior to Jews ====
Hyam Maccoby and the ADL describe a criticism that the Talmud treats non-Jews as animals or sub-human, "deserving only hatred and contempt from Jewish superiors." As an example, the ADL report describes the criticism that the Talmud uses a Hebrew word for "cow" or "animal" to identify non-Jews, and the ADL points out that the word actually means "a member of a nation." Critics also cite Yebamoth 98a which critics claim describes non-Jewish children as animals, but this passage is discussing converts to Judaism, and is asserting that they no longer have any legal relationship with their non-Jewish father.

==== Punishment for murder ====
Dan Cohn-Sherbok and Gil Student have discussed the criticism made by Nicholas Donin, Elizabeth Dilling, Israel Shahak and others that the Talmud has a double-standard for punishing murder: critics claim that the Talmud provides more severe punishments when the victim is a Jew rather than a non-Jews. The passages cited are Sanhedrin 57a (murder of a Jew is punishable by death, but murder of a non-Jew is not) and Sanhedrin 58b (when a non-Jew hits a Jew, the Gentile must be killed).

However, all murder is forbidden by the Talmud, and all murder – regardless of the victim's status – was punished. The passages cited by the critics was referring only to capital punishment, which was administered very rarely. The passages appears in the context of a debate discussing various alternative punishments and – taken as a whole – the Talmud as a whole condemns murder of non-Jews.

===== Murder of non-Jews =====
Steven Schwarzschild and Dan Cohn-Sherbok discuss the criticism that the Jerusalem Talmud, in a discussion about tactics to be employed during battle, contains the phrase "even the best of the gentiles should all be killed" (Tob shebe goyyim harog) which has been cited by numerous critics of the Talmud, including the disputations in the Middle Ages. The passage is found in Minor Tractates. Soferim 15, Rule 10, and is based on Mechilta, Beshalach 2 (discussing Exodus 14:5–7)

An early example of this criticism was by Nicholas Donin who – during the Disputation of Paris – claimed that the Jerusalem Talmud (Soferim 15) "states that 'the best gentile may be killed'. In response, a rabbi defended this Talmud text by saying an important phrase was omitted: 'the best gentile may be killed in time of war'." Rabbi Steven Schwarzschild criticized this passage in relation to it use on modern warfare.

The context of the text is within a battle situation, specifically Israelites fighting Egyptians during the Exodus narrative, and in that context it can be understood as "when in battle, do not try to spare the lives of those opposing soldiers who are fine, upstanding people. Kill any enemy soldier, regardless of their character."

==== Assisting non-Jews ====
Dan Cohn-Sherbok describes a criticism about the maxim found in the Talmud which says "[non-Jews] are neither to be lifted out of a well nor hauled down into it," from Babylonian Talmud, in Tractate Avodah Zarah 26b. Critics also cite the related writings of Maimonides (1137–1204), who codified Talmudic law by writing "as for gentiles [non-Jews], the basic ... principle is that their lives must not be saved, although it is also forbidden to murder them outright."

However, religious authorities point out that those religious dicta must be interpreted within the context that they were created, and that non-Jews in that context were idolaters. In addition, arguments against such discrimination were posited by leading rabbis starting in the Middle Ages, and the rules are no longer enforced.

===== Breaking sabbath to save the life of a non-Jew =====
All rabbinic authorities agree that the Sabbath should be violated to save any human life, including non-Jews. Efraim Shmueli discusses the criticism that the Talmud's sabbath rules have been interpreted to mean that Jews should not violate the Sabbath in order to save non-Jews that are dying. Some critics point to the fact that the Talmud includes the maxim "[non-Jews] are neither to be lifted out of a well nor hauled down into it." Critics also cite the writings of Maimonides (1137–1204), an important Rabbinical commentator, who wrote "as for gentiles [non-Jews], the basic Talmudic principle is that their lives must not be saved, although it is also forbidden to murder them outright."

One widely debated text from the Talmud reads "If any man saves alive a single soul in Israel, Scripture imputes it to him as though he had saved a whole world" (emphasis added). Many authorities interpret the words "in Israel" as limiting the text to saving only Jews. The words "in Israel" appear in most versions of the Talmud, but not in others. A widely published commentary on this text, by Rabbi Samuel Eliezer Eidels (1555–1631), reads: "This [text] is intended to teach you that any man who saves one soul in Israel, and it is intentionally specified 'one soul in Israel', in the singular form, as this is the image of God, the Singular one of the world, and Jacob's [Israel's] form is His likeness ... but Kuttim [non-Jews] do not have the form of man, only the form of other creatures, and whoever brings about the loss of a soul among them does not lose the world, and whoever saves a soul among them neither adds nor diminishes anything in this world." Critics claim Eidels' commentary is significant because it is included in most published editions of the Talmud.

==== Immoral conduct or status ====
The Talmud contains many rules discouraging contact with non-Jews, or discouraging consumption of food or drink that had been in contact with non-Jews. These rules considered non-Jews to be idolators, and the purpose of the rules was avoid contamination in ways that would violate Talmudic guidelines of purity and cleanliness. Dan Cohn-Sherbok, Yehoshafat Harkabi, Hyam Maccoby, Gil Student, and the ADL discuss criticisms that interpret these rules as discriminatory or racist.

Some modern critics claim the that Talmud describes all non-Jewish women to be in a state of uncleanliness (niddah) from their youth, citing Niddah 31b (“The daughters of the Samaritans are regarded as menstruants from their cradle.”) and Abodah Zarah 36b ("heathens and their daughters … should be considered as in the state of niddah from their cradle"). However, this Talmudic text, rather than a statement about the character of non-Jewish women, was instead an example of considering non-Jews as idolators, and discouraging interaction with idolators (because Jews should avoid contact with persons in a state of niddah). Also, this guidance was "a general restriction intended to deter Jewish men from sexual relationships with gentile women."

Donin and Pranaitis, among other critics, claimed the Talmud suggests that non-Jews are prone to bestiality, and they cite Abodah Zarah 15b, Abodah Zarah 22a, and Abodah Zarah 22b. However, Abodah Zarah 15b appears as part of a debate, which also includes arguments that non-Jews are not prone to bestiality, and Abodah Zarah 22 is discussing immorality of idolators in general. In addition, this text appears in the broader context of discussing whether cattle and other foods would be kosher to eat, after the cattle had been in contact with idolators. Walzer maintains that the bestiality discussion in the Talmud is part of a broader discussion about the general immoral character of non-Jews.

Pranaitis wrote that the Talmud says Jews should not associate with non-Jews because non-Jews tend to murder, citing Abodah Zarah 22a: "… nor should a [Jewish] man be alone with them [non-Jews], because they are suspected of shedding blood" and Abodah Zarah 25b "If a Jew happens to be overtaken by an idolater while on the road … nor should the Israelite bend down in front of him, lest he smashes his skull."

Donin gave the example of Talmud text Avodah Zarah 29b, which says that Jews cannot drink wine that has been touched by non-Jews. Pranaitis also echos that criticism, writing "The Talmud teaches, however, that Christians are people whose touch alone makes things unclean" and he cites Abodah Zarah 72b which reads: "A man was drawing wine through [a siphon consisting of] a large and small tube. A heathen came and laid his hand upon the large tube, and Raba disqualified all the wine." The response to Donin, given by rabbis in the disputation, was that "gentile" in that context did not include Christians, and instead means ancient Egyptians and Canaanites, who were considered idolaters. In addition, the prohibition did not reflect on the character of non-Jews, but instead was a guard against the possibility that the non-Jews may have offered the wine to pagan gods.

==== Deceiving or stealing from non-Jews ====
Hyam Maccoby, the ADL, Dan Cohn-Sherbok, Yehoshafat Harkabi, and Gil Student describe the criticism that the Talmud permits Jews to deceive or steal from non-Jews, without religious or moral compunction. Criticisms involving deceit focus on Baba Kamma 113a, which contains the phrase "we use subterfuges to circumvent him [non-Jew]" when discussing lawsuits between Jews and non-Jews. Yet elsewhere the Talmud states: "It is forbidden to deceive people, even heathens (non-Jews)." (Chullin 94a)

Gil Student documents a criticism that says that the Talmud permits Jews to withhold wages from non-Jews. which relies on Sanhedrin 57a "[i]t applies to the withholding of a labourer's wage. One Cuthean from another, or a Cuthean from an Israelite is forbidden, but an Israelite from a Cuthean is permitted." Student describes this text as applying only to the situation where the Jew is no legal obligation to pay the wages (due to a contract oversight) – the Talmud instructs Jews to go beyond their legal obligations and pay when the laborer is a Jew, but Jews do not have to pay when the laborer is not a Jew.

Critics of the Talmud have criticized the Talmud's rules on returning lost or stolen property, citing Baba Mezia 24a and Baba Kamma 113b, which contains the phrase "you need not make restoration to a heathen [non-Jew]" when discussing the return of lost property.

A related text is Sanhedrin 57a "With respect to robbery – if one stole … [and] if (these were perpetrated) by one Cuthean [Gentile] against another ... must not be kept, and likewise (the theft) of an Israelite by a Cuthean, but that of a Cuthean by an Israelite may be retained?" A related text cited by critics is Sanhedrin 76b "One who … returns a lost article to a Cuthean … [t]he Lord will not spare him."

Steven D. Fraade analyzed the "double standard" found in Talmud's rules about returning lost or stolen property to non-Jews, and writes "a Jew may retain the stolen property of a gentile, except where by so doing, he would bring disrepute to the Jewish [society]." Fraade also writes "[a]lthough the sages disagree whether the robbed property of a gentile must be restored, they all agree that there is no such legal obligation to restore the lost property of a gentile. Daniel Sperber suggests that this legal discrimination is based on the objective reasoning of the Jewish "social contract" (non-reciprocity). In this case, the Talmud rules that the commandment to restore lost property to its owner does not apply to gentiles because gentiles do not act reciprocally in such cases. The rationale for such just laws of reciprocity and retaliation, although seldom practised, was in order to compel the heathens to adopt civil laws. Others contend that during that era "such restoration would be a hazardous undertaking." Nevertheless, the Talmud does illustrate instances of rabbis who returned lost items to gentiles. (Jeru. Bava Metzia 2:5 [7a])

Gil Student maintains that numerous later Jewish religious authorities explicitly prohibit stealing from non-Jews. Earlier Jewish religious texts upon which the Talmud is based explicitly prohibit stealing from non-Jews, as in Tosefta (Baba Kamma 10:8), which warns that doing so is a more severe transgression as it also involves chillul Hashem. However, some critics point out that the rationale is not ethical behavior, but rather fear of bringing Jewish society into danger or disrepute. Jewish philosopher Michael Walzer discusses how the Talmud's permission to steal from non-Jews occurs in the context of tax evasion, which the Talmud encourages, as long as it is not discovered, which would lead to "the name of God to be profaned."

== See also ==
- Antisemitism
- Antisemitic canards
- Criticism of Judaism
- Criticism of the Bible
- Criticism of the Quran
- Criticism of the Book of Mormon

== Sources ==
=== Primary source critics ===
- Chiarini, Luigi – Theory of Judaism (French Theorie du judaisme), published by J. Barbezat, 1829–1830. Reprinted 2008 by BiblioBazaar. online
- Acosta [da Costa], Uriel, Examination of Pharisaic Traditions (Exame das Tradições Farisaicas), 1623. Translated into English in Volume 44 of Brill's studies in intellectual history (Edited and translated by Herman Prins Salomon, I. S. D. Sassoon). BRILL, 1993 ISBN 90-04-09923-9. Online here.
- Acosta [da Costa], Uriel, Proposal against tradition (Propostar contra a Tradicao), 1616.
- Dilling, Elizabeth. The Plot Against Christianity, Lincoln, Nebraska: The Elizabeth Dilling Foundation, 1964. Later re-published as The Jewish Religion: Its Influence Today, The Noontide Press, 1983.
- Duke, David. My Awakening, Free Speech Press, 1998.
- Duke, David, Jewish Supremacism, Free Speech Press, 2003.
- Eisenmenger, Johann Andreas. Entdecktes Judenthum, 1711, in German, online. English version (abridged) translated by Stehelin, John Peter as Rabinical Literature: Or, The Traditions Of The Jews, J. Robinson, 1748, online. Stehelin's English translation re-published in 2006 as The Traditions of the Jews, by Independent History & Research.
- Fasolt, Walter, The Basic Principles of the Talmud (German: Die Grundlagen des Talmud: der nichtjüdische Standpunkt), H. W. Pötsch, 1935
- Hoffman, Michael A. II. Judaism’s Strange Gods, The Independent History and Research Co., 2000.
- Hoffman, Michael A. II. Judaism discovered from its own texts: a study of the anti-biblical religion of racism, self-worship, superstition and deceit, Independent History and Research, 2008. online.
- Marti, Raymond, Capistrum Judaeorum (A muzzle for the Jews), 1267. In Latin.
- Marti, Raymond, Pugio Fidei (The Dagger of the Faith), 1278. In Latin. Edited and reprinted as Pugio Fidei Raymundi Martini Ordinis Prædicatorum Adversus Mauros et Judæos (Paris, 1651). Reprinted (in Latin) by Gregg Press, 1967.
- Pranaitis, I. B. Christianus in Talmude Iudaeorum (The Talmud Unmasked: The Secret Rabbinical Teachings Concerning Christians), 1892. English translations: Online here. English translation: Kessinger Publishing, 2006; or E. N. Sancuary 1939.
- Rohling, August, Der Talmud Jude. 1871. Online (German language) here. English translation The Jew according to the Talmud, Sons of Liberty, 1978.
- Shahak, Israël (1994). Jewish history, Jewish religion: the weight of three thousand years. Pluto Press. ISBN 0745308198.

=== Responses and secondary sources ===
- Anti-Defamation League, The Talmud in Anti-Semitic Polemics ADL report, ADL, 2003. Online here.
- Bacher, Wilhelm, "Talmud", article in Jewish Encyclopedia, Funk & Wagnalls Company, 1901. Article online. See especially sections "Attacks on the Talmud" at and "Influence of the Talmud" at .
- Baer, Yitzhak, The disputations of Rabbi Yehiel of Paris and Nachmanides (Hebrew), International Center for University Teaching of Jewish Civilization, 1980. For English translations of the primary source material, see Maccoby.
- Bar-Hayim, David Jews Are Called Man: The Distinction between Jews and Gentiles in Torah online here.
- Carlebach, Elisheva, Divided souls: converts from Judaism in Germany, 1500–1750, Yale University Press, 2001
- Carroll, James, Constantine's sword: the church and the Jews : a history, Houghton Mifflin Harcourt, 2002
- Cohn-Sherbok, Dan, Judaism and other faiths, Palgrave Macmillan, 1994
- Cohn, Werner "A Review of Jewish Religion, Jewish History by Israel Shahak", Israel Horizons, vol. 42, no. 3 of 4, Autumn 1994, pp. 28–9. online
- Dalman, Gustaf and Laible, Heinrich, Jesus Christ in the Talmud, Midrash, Zohar, and the Liturgy of the Synagogue, translated by A. W. Streane; publisher Deighton Bell, 1893 (reprinted Arno, 1973).
- Fraade, Steven D, "Navigating the Anomalous: Non-Jews at the Intersection of Early Rabbinic Law and Narrative", in The Other in Jewish thought and history: constructions of Jewish culture and identity, Silberstein, Laurence, and Cohn, Robert (Eds), NYU Press, 1994, pp 145–165.
- Graetz, Heinrich, History of the Jews. Volume 2. From the Reign of Hyrcanus (135 B.C.E.) to the Completion of the Babylonian Talmud (500 C.E.), Jewish Publication Society of America, 1893. Reprinted 2006 by Adamant Media Corporation. Originally published in German in 1853–1875 as Geschichte der Juden von den ältesten Zeiten bis auf die Gegenwart.
- Harkabi, Yehoshafat, Arab attitudes to Israel, John Wiley and Sons, 1974
- Hertzberg, Arthur, The French Enlightenment and the Jews: the origins of modern anti-Semitism, Columbia University Press, 1990
- Isaacs, Abram S., "Talmud" article in The Encyclopedia Americana, Encyclopedia Americana Corp., 1919
- Krauss, Samuel, The Jewish-Christian controversy from the earliest times to 1789, J.C.B. Mohr (Paul Siebeck), 1996
- Laible, Heinrich, Jesus Christus im Thalmud (Jesus Christ in the Talmud), 1893. English translation published 2010 by General Books;
- Levy, Richard S., Antisemitism: a historical encyclopedia of prejudice and persecution, Volume 2, ABC-CLIO, 2005. See articles: "Talmud Trials", "Entdecktes Judenthum", "The Talmud Jew", "David Duke", "August Rohling", and "Johannes Pfefferkorn".
- Maccoby, Hyam, Judaism on Trial: Jewish-Christian Disputations in the Middle Ages, The Littman Library of Jewish Civilization, 1993 (orig published by Fairleigh Dickinson University Press in 1982). A compendium of primary source materials, with commentary.
- Nahmanides, Vikuah ha-Ramban. Nahmanides' description of the Barcelona disputation, translated by Hyam Maccoby in Judaism on Trial: Jewish-Christian Disputations in the Middle Ages, 1982, pp 102–150.
- Nadler, Steven, Spinoza: a life, Cambridge University Press, 2001
- Neusner, Jacob, Making God's word work: a guide to the Mishnah, Continuum International Publishing Group, 2004
- Rodkinson, Michael Levi, The history of the Talmud from the time of its formation, about 200 B.C., up to the present time, The Talmud Society, 1918
- Scult, Mel (1993). Judaism faces the twentieth century: a biography of Mordecai M. Kaplan. Wayne State University Press. ISBN 0814322808.
- Segal, Arthur, A Spiritual and Ethical Compendium to the Torah and Talmud, Rabbi Arthur Segal, 2009
- Seidman, Naomi, Faithful renderings: Jewish-Christian difference and the politics of translation, University of Chicago Press, 2006
- Silberstein, Laurence, and Cohn, Robert, The Other in Jewish thought and history: constructions of Jewish culture and identity NYU Press, 1994.
- Steinsaltz, Adin, The Essential Talmud, Basic Books, 2006.
- Student, Gil – Rebuttals to criticisms of Talmud
- Van Voorst, Robert E. Jesus outside the New Testament: an introduction to the ancient evidence, Wm. B. Eerdmans Publishing, 2000
- Verga, Solomon Ibn, Shevet Yehudah, 1550. A very early account of Paris and Tortosa disputations. Translated and reprinted by Hyam Maccoby in Judaism on Trial: Jewish-Christian Disputations in the Middle Ages, 1982.
- Walzer, Michael, The Jewish Political Tradition: Volume Two: Membership, Yale University Press, 2006. Particularly chapter 16 "Gentiles" pp 441–530.
- Wegner, Judith Romney. "The Image and Status of Women in Classical Rabbinic Judaism" in Jewish Women in Historical Perspective, Judith Baskin (Ed.), Wayne State University Press, 1999, pp 73–100.
- Yehiel of Paris, "The Disputation of Jehiel of Paris" (Hebrew), in Collected Polemics and Disputations, J. D. Eisenstein (Ed.), Hebrew Publishing Company, 1922. Translated and reprinted by Hyam Maccoby in Judaism on Trial: Jewish-Christian Disputations in the Middle Ages, 1982.
