= Johann Andreas Eisenmenger =

German Orientalist (1654–1704)

Johann Andreas Eisenmenger (1654, Mannheim – 20 December 1704, Heidelberg) was a German orientalist scholar from the Electorate of the Palatinate, now best known as the author of Entdecktes Judenthum (Judaism Unmasked), which was published in two volumes in 1711 and 1714.

In this work, Eisenmenger sought to expose the allegedly secret and nefarious practices of Jews, and he claimed that Judaism was a false religion that had been invented by the ancient Israelites in an attempt to deceive the world.

Financier Samuel Oppenheimer, one of the most influential Jewish members of the Court of the House of Habsburg, fearing that the book's publication would give additional strength to the prejudice against them, denounced it as a malicious libel, and tried to have the work banned. He failed, but subsequently his rival, the financier and rabbi Samson Wertheimer successfully petitioned Emperor Leopold I to have the book banned.

His work was widely read and had a significant influence on European attitudes toward Jews in the 18th and 19th centuries. It is considered an early example of modern antisemitism and played a role in shaping the negative stereotypes and prejudices that were held against Jews in Europe at the time. While his charges have been recognized by modern scholars as distorted, the work remains an influential text in the history of antisemitism.

== Studies of rabbinical literature ==
The son of an official in the service of the Elector of the Palatinate Charles I Louis (who had, in 1673, offered Spinoza a chair in philosophy at Heidelberg), Eisenmenger received a good education, despite the early loss of his father to plague when he was 12 years old. He distinguished himself at the Collegium Sapientiae at Heidelberg by his zeal for Hebrew studies and Semitic languages. He eventually mastered Hebrew, Arabic and Aramaic. He was sent by the Elector to England and Holland to pursue his studies there. He studied rabbinical literature with Jewish assistance for some 19 years both at Heidelberg and Frankfurt, under the pretense, it was rumoured, of wishing to convert to Judaism. In Holland he established amicable relations with figures like Rabbi David ben Aryeh Leib of Lida, formerly of Lithuania, and then head of the Ashkenazi community in Amsterdam. An intended sojourn in Palestine was interrupted by the death of his sponsor in August of 1680.

Later scholars cite two episodes during his sojourn in Amsterdam, which may or may not be apocryphal, to account for the formation of his anti-Judaic outlook. It is said that he was a witness, in 1681, to "otherwise unknown" attacks against Christianity by a senior rabbi there, identified as David Lida, and that he grew indignant on finding that three Christians he met had had themselves circumcised and converted to Judaism. Anti-Christian polemics were, uniquely to Europe, published in Amsterdam and Eisenmenger's anger was aroused when Lida quoted Rabbi Isaiah ben Abraham Horowitz to the effect that the archangel Samael, king of the devils, was a celestial representation of Christians.

== Entdecktes Judenthum ==
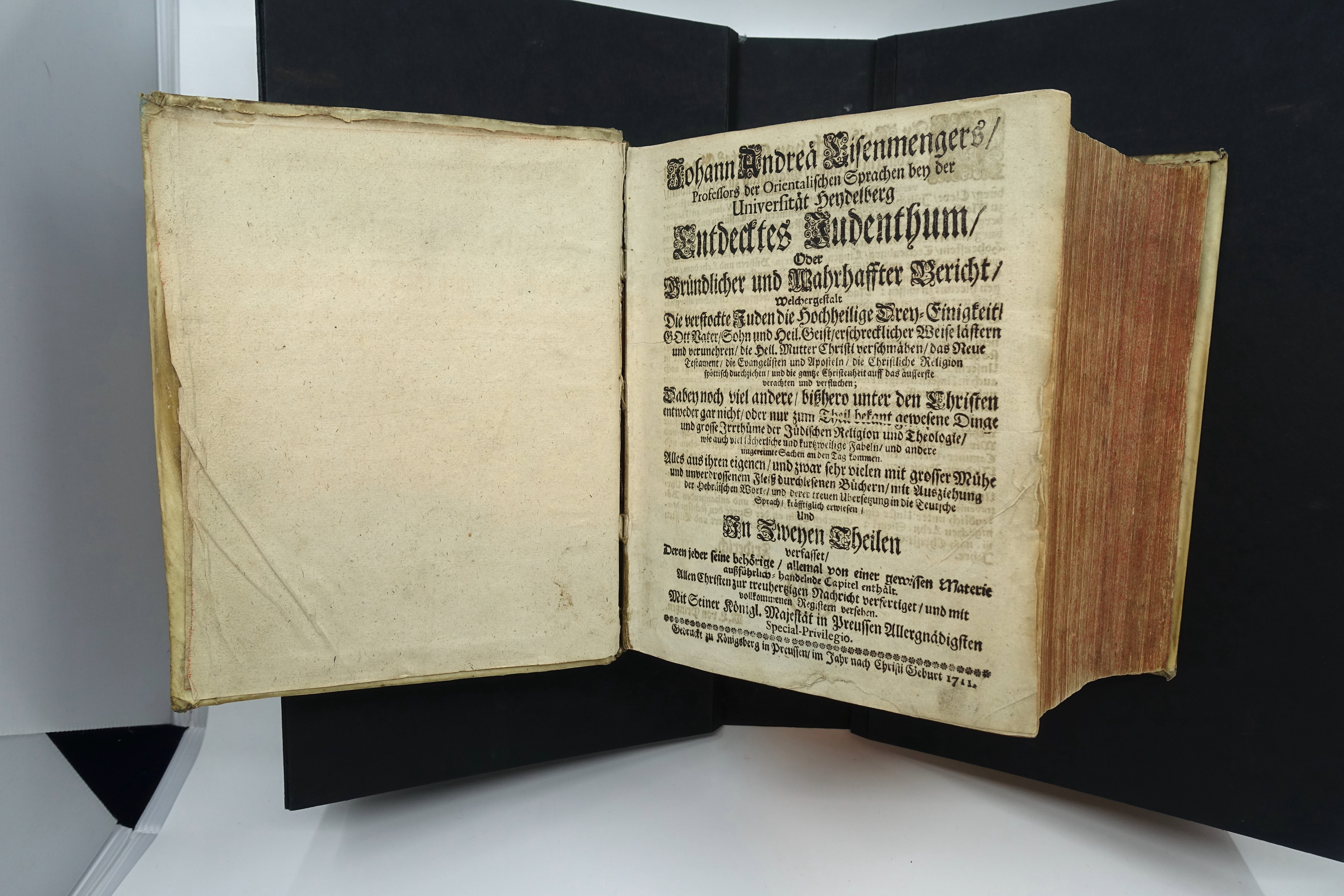
1711 edition of Entdecktes Judentum, in the collection of the Jewish Museum of Switzerland.

The method Eisenmenger employed in this work has been called both 'coarsely literalist and non-contextual' and 'rigorously scholarly and exegetical', using only Jewish sources, which he did not invent or forge. Having collected citations from 193 books and rabbinical tracts not only in Hebrew and Aramaic but also in Yiddish, all accompanied by German translations ranging over legal issues, cabala, homiletics, philosophy, ethics and polemics against both Islam and Christianity, he published his Entdecktes Judenthum (English titles include Judaism Unveiled, Judaism Discovered, Judaism Revealed, and Judaism Unmasked, with the latter title most commonly used), which has served as a source for detractors of Talmudic literature down to the present day. Eisenmenger made considerable use of works written by Jewish converts to Christianity, such as Samuel Friedrich Brenz's Jüdischer abgestreiffter Schlangen-Balg (Jewish cast-off snakeskin, 1614), to bolster his anti-Jewish charges. This pseudoscientific work interprets Jewish texts in ways that diverge considerably from the ways Jews themselves interpret them.

The work, in two large quarto volumes, appeared in Frankfurt in 1700, and the Elector, Prince Johann Wilhelm, took great interest in it, appointing Eisenmenger professor of Oriental languages in the University of Heidelberg. Eisenmenger's purpose, he avowed, was to have Jews recognize the errors of their ways and what he conceived to be the truth of Christianity. To this end he urged that several measures be undertaken, including restricting their economic liberties and rights, banning them from writing criticisms of Christianity, and proscribing both their synagogues and law courts.

Entdecktes Judent[h]um, title page of F. X. Schieferl's edition

The book was designed not only to reveal to Christians the existence of elements in Jewish rabbinical thought which Eisenmenger thought injurious to the Christian faith, but also to appeal to a free-thinking secular public, and to enlightened Jews whom he wished to shock by his revelations. In particular he hoped to use his evidence in order to promote the conversion of 'honest Jews' to his own faith. Paul Lawrence Rose writes:

'Eisenmenger proceeded to amass quotations from the Talmud and other Hebrew sources revealing to all how the Jewish religion was barbarous, superstitious, and even murderous. All this was done in an apparently scholarly and reasonable way that belied the author's evident preoccupation (like Luther) with tales of Jewish ritual murder of Christian children and poisoning of wells. While piously insisting that the Jews must not be converted by cruel methods, Eisenmenger blithely recommended abolishing their present 'freedom in trade,' which was making them 'lords' over the Germans. He demanded too an immediate ban on their synagogues, public worship, and communal leaders and rabbis.'

A further, if minor, element in his polemic consisted of an argument that Germans were a distinct people within Christianity, descended from the Canaanites, whom 'the Jews' were intent on destroying in accordance with Deuteronomy 7:16.

Samuel Oppenheimer, one of the most influential Jewish members of the Court of the House of Habsburg, Jewish Factor (Hoffaktor) to the Court in Vienna, fearing that the book's publication would give additional strength to the prejudice against them, denounced it as a malicious libel, and tried to have the work suppressed. He failed, but subsequently his rival, the financier and rabbi Samson Wertheimer successfully petitioned Emperor Leopold I to have Eisenmenger's book suppressed. Only a year previously, riots against the Jews had occurred in the diocese of Bamberg, and that in the same year (21 July) a mob had, with the Court's permission, sacked Oppenheimer's house. The aim of the riot was to pressure him over huge debts the Court had contracted for his services in financing the Habsburgs. Oppenheimer in turn succeeded in procuring an order of confiscation from the emperor, who commanded that the whole edition of 2,000 copies be placed under lock and key. However, the State refused to honour its debts to him. With him others worked for the same end, including Juspa van Geldern the great-grandfather of Heinrich Heine's mother. The Jesuit order, according to Hartmann, also complained about the book on the grounds that it slandered Catholicism. The anecdote perhaps is intended to suggest that the success of the Jewish request for the book's suppression depended on its association with the Jesuits' criticism

According to one report written some decades later, certain Jews had offered Eisenmenger the sum of 12,000 florins if he would suppress his work; but he was rumored to have demanded 30,000 florins, ostensibly in compensation for the considerable outlay from his own savings which the publication of the book had caused him to contribute. If any such proposed transaction was negotiated, nothing came of it. Eisenmenger died suddenly of apoplexy, some say induced by grief over the suppression of his book in 1704.

Meanwhile, two Jewish converts to Christianity in Berlin had brought charges against their former co-religionists of having blasphemed Jesus. King Frederick William I took the matter very seriously, and ordered an investigation. Eisenmenger's heirs applied to the king; and the latter tried to induce the emperor to repeal the injunction against the book, but did not succeed. He therefore ordered in 1711 a new edition of 3,000 copies to be printed in Berlin at his expense, but as there was an imperial prohibition against printing the book in the German empire, the title page gave as the place of publication Königsberg, which was beyond the boundaries of the empire. Almost forty years later the original edition was released.

Of the many polemical works written by non-Jews against Judaism, Eisenmenger's has remained the one which is most thoroughly documented. Precisely because of its extensive citations of primary sources in their original languages, with facing translations, it has long furnished antisemites with their main arguments. Eisenmenger undoubtedly possessed a great deal of knowledge. Jacob Katz writes:

‘Eisenmenger was acquainted with all the literature a Jewish scholar of standing would have known ... [He] surpassed his [non-Jewish] predecessors in his mastery of the sources and his ability to interpret them tendentiously. Contrary to accusations that have been made against him, he does not falsify his sources."

Eisenmenger cited authentic sources. Katz again writes:

Eisenmenger neither forged his sources nor pulled his accusations out of thin air. There was a nucleus of truth in all his claims: the Jews lived in a world of legendary or mythical concepts, of ethical duality-following different standards of morality in their internal and external relationships- and they dreamed with imaginative speculation of their future in the time of the Messiah. Similar claims, however, could have been made against the Christian as well. One critic, a Christian theologian himself, said rightly that using Eisenmenger’s method, an Entdecktes Christenthum could easily have been written.'

What are often challenged are the many inferences he made from these texts. He took things out of context, made incorrect interpretations and used a relatively small number of texts within the huge chain of rabbinical commentary to characterise Judaism as a whole. In regard to the first two points, Siegfried, for one, argued that:

'Taken as a whole, it is a collection of scandals. Some passages are misinterpreted; others are insinuations based on one-sided inferences; and even if this were not the case, a work which has for its object the presentation of the dark side of Jewish literature can not give us a proper understanding of Judaism.'

In regard to the third point, G. Dalman wrote that:

'it could no more be called a faithful representation of Judaism than an indiscriminate collection of everything superstitious and repulsive within Christian literature could be termed characteristic of Christianity'

As Katz notes, while Eisenmenger knew Hebrew, Aramaic, and Arabic, and quoted sources and translated them to German, he mischaracterized the Jewish attitudes of the time. Talmud contains opposing opinions on many issues. To someone knowledgeable about Jewish literature, Eisenmenger's portrayal would be structurally familiar but almost like a parody. His extremist theses include believing in literal blood libels and well poisoning. His views were representative of mainstream medieval Christian attitudes. Some translations were erroneous or intentionally distorted, as noted by Zvi Avneri in the Encyclopedia Judaica, who speculates he may not have believed what he wrote and was willing to solicit a payment not to publish. He failed to recognize where passages were not to be taken literally, contradicted elsewhere, or no longer considered binding. Although he knew passages about violence to idolaters didn't apply to the Noahide Christians, he nonetheless claimed Jews were doing harm to Christians due to these quoted texts. Sacha Stern notes that while his quotations are generally reliable, his translations and interpretations aren't, and that Jewish prejudices toward non-Jews in the Late Antique were not unique and can be compared with other groups such as Greeks, and that by the Middle Ages, Talmudic scholars had unanimously ruled that these views pertained to ancient pagans and no longer applied.

== Use by later antisemitic writers ==
The Catholic theologian August Rohling exploited the material in Eisenmenger's book in order to construct the fabrications of his antisemitic polemic Der Talmudjude (1871). The Lutheran biblical scholar Franz Delitzsch subjected Rohling's book to a close examination and found that he not only drew on Eisenmenger, but introduced many significant distortions. Rohling's book however coincided with a rise in antisemitism and often influenced humanist critics and/or antisemites, who often cite him, rather than Eisenmenger's own voluminous treatise. One such example is afforded by Sir Richard Francis Burton, who, in his antisemitic volume The Jew, Gypsy, and El Islam (1898), relied in part on Rohling's text. In recent decades the kind of material from rabbinical sources which Eisenmenger exploited to attack Judaism in general has been often discussed in contextualising certain extremist currents in modern Jewish fundamentalism, of the kind observed in religious-political movements like those associated with the Lubavitcher Rebbe, Meir Kahane, Abraham Isaac Kook and his son Zvi Yehuda Kook, such as Kach and Gush Emunim.

An English abridgment of Eisenmenger's volumes was published by John Peter Stehelin in 1748 under the title The Traditions of the Jews, with the Expositions and Doctrines of the Rabbins.

A 19th century German edition of Entdecktes Judent[h]um, edited by F. X. Schieferl, was published by Otto Brandner, Dresden, 1893.

== Further works ==
Eisenmenger edited with Johannes Leusden the unvocalized Hebrew Bible, Frankfurt am Main, 1694, and wrote a Lexicon Orientale Harmonicum, which to this day has not been published.

== See also ==
- Elias von Cyon
- Nicholas Donin
- Anton Margaritha
- Johannes Pfefferkorn
- Samuel Friedrich Brenz
- Jacob Brafman
- August Rohling

== Bibliography ==
- Eisenmenger, Johann Andreas. Entdecktes Judenthum, 1711, in German, online. English version (abridged) translated by Stehelin, John Peter as Rabbinical Literature: Or, The Traditions Of The Jews, J. Robinson, 1748, online. Stehelin's English translation re-published in 2006 as The Traditions of the Jews, by Independent History & Research.
- Johann Jakob Schudt, Jüdische Merckwürdigkeiten, i. 426-438, iii. 1-8, iv. 286
- Heinrich Grätz, Gesch. 3d ed., x. 276
- Löwenstein, in Berliner's Magazin, 1891, p. 209
- Kaufmann, Aus Heinrich Heine's Ahnensaal, p. 61
- Eckstein, Gesch. der Juden im Fürstbistum. p. 42
- Bamberg, 1898 Herzog-Hauck, Real-Encyc., s.v. Wetzer and Welte
- Kirchenlexikon; Allg. Deutsche Biographie.

From a polemical point of view:

- Franz Delitzsch, Rohling's Talmudjude Beleuchtet, Leipzig, 1881
- J. S. Kopp, Aktenstücke zum Prozesse Rohling-Bloch, Vienna, 1882
- A. Th. Hartmann, Johann Andreas Eisenmenger und Seine Jüdischen Gegner, Parchim, 1834
- Constantin Ritter Cholewa von Pawlikowski, Hundert Bogen aus Mehr als Fünfhundert Alten und Neuen Büchern über die, Juden Neben den Christen, Freiburg, 1859.
