= Vladislav Khodasevich =

Russian poet and literary critic (1886–1939)

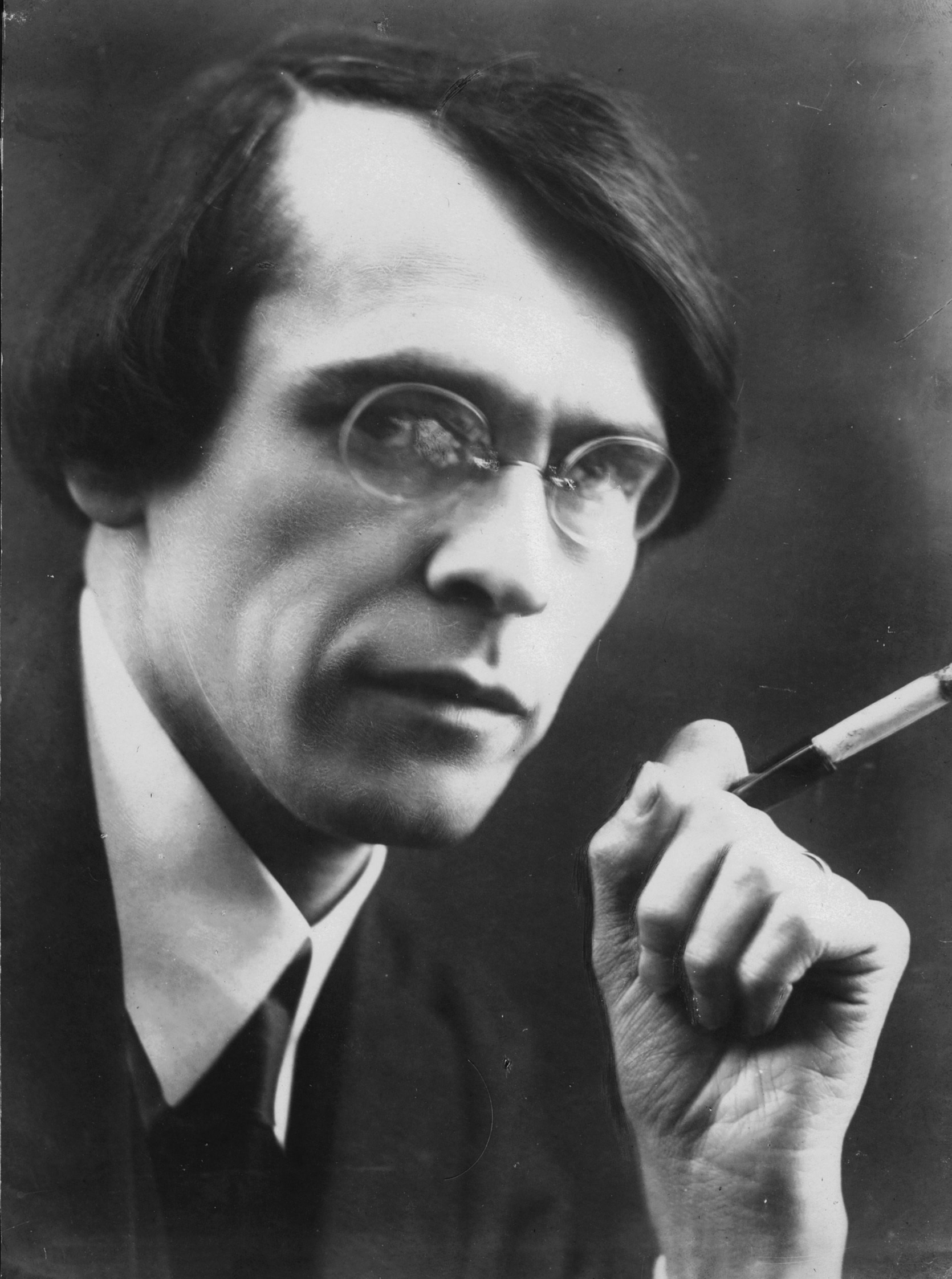
- Born: May 16, 1886
- Died: June 14, 1939 (aged 53); Paris, France
- Education: Moscow State University
- Relatives: Jacob Brafman
- Writing career
- Years active: 1906-1939
- Genres: Poet, Russian literature

Vladislav Felitsianovich Khodasevich (Russian: Владисла́в Фелициа́нович Ходасе́вич; 16 May (28 May) 1886 – 14 June 1939) was an influential Russian poet and literary critic who presided over the Berlin circle of Russian emigre litterateurs.

== Life and career ==
Khodasevich was born in Moscow into a family of Felitsian Khodasevich and Sofiia Iakovlevna (née Brafman), a woman of Jewish descent whose family had converted to Christianity. Earlier claims that his father was of Polish noble or Lithuanian descent are not supported by documentary evidence. The surname “Khodasevich” is of Belarusian origin, derived from the given name Khadas’ (Faddey). Archival evidence shows that the Khodasevich family were registered as petty bourgeois of Minsk in 1891, residing in Moscow. While still a student at the Imperial Academy of Arts in St. Petersburg, Felitsian Khodasevich contracted in 1861 to paint icons for the Church of the Transfiguration in the town of Rakaw completing the work the following year.

His grandfather Jacob Brafman was famous as a Jewish convert to Russian Orthodoxy who authored The Book of the Kahal (1869), a polemical forerunner of the Protocols of the Elders of Zion. He left Moscow University after understanding that poetry was his true vocation. Khodasevich's first collections of poems, Youth (1907) and A Happy Little House (1914), were subsequently discarded by him as immature.

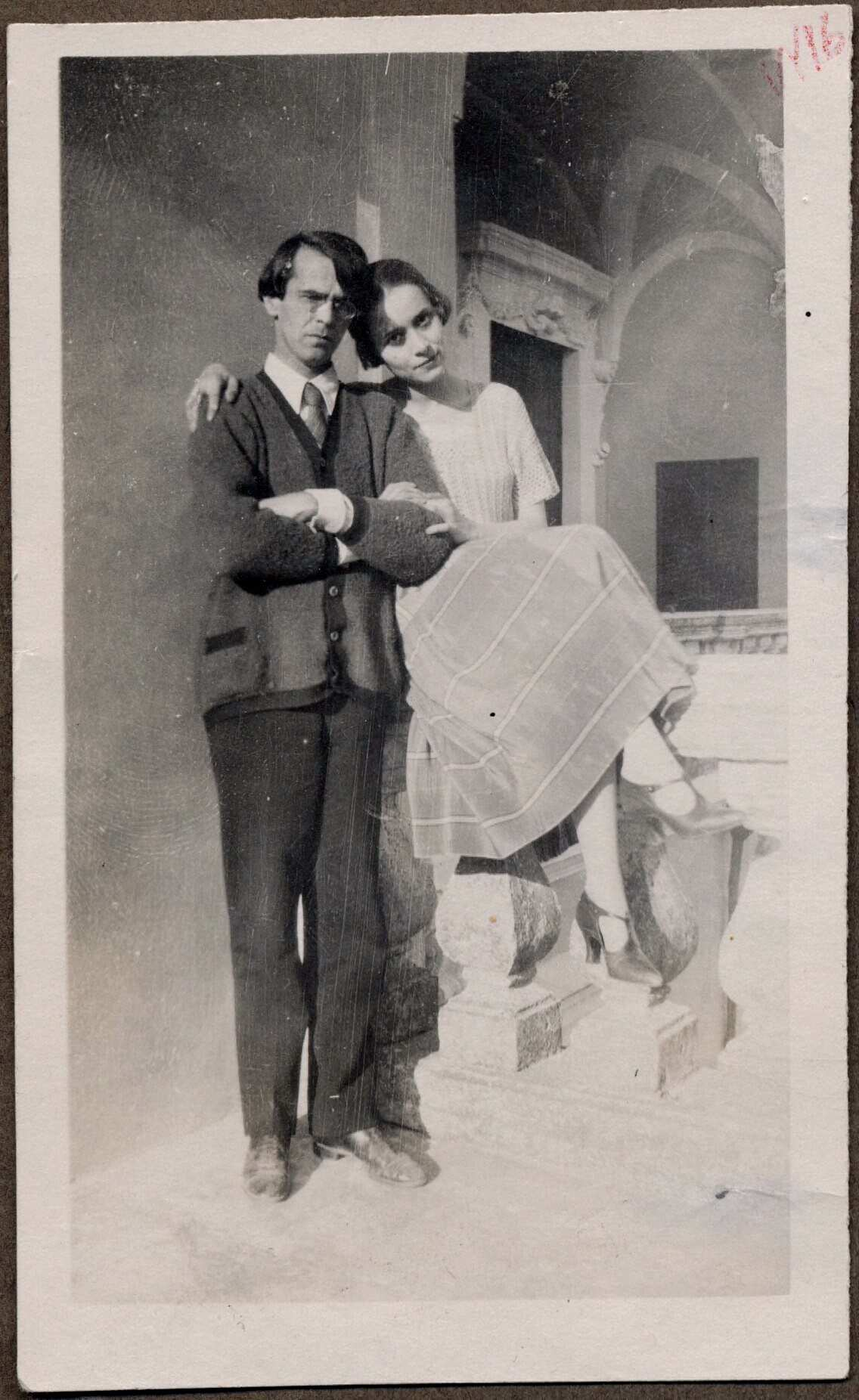
Vladislav Khodasevich and Nina Berberova in Sorrento in 1925

In the year 1917, Khodasevich gained wider renown by writing a superb short piece The Way of Corn, a reflection on the biblical image of wheat as a plant that cannot live if it does not first die. This poem is eponymous with Khodasevich's best known collection of verse, first published in 1920 and revised in 1922.

Patronized by Maxim Gorky, Khodasevich and his wife Nina Berberova (herself a distinguished littérateur, 1901–1993) left Russia for Gorky's villa in Sorrento, Italy. Later they moved to Berlin, where they took up with Andrei Bely. Khodasevich's complicated relationship with this maverick genius ended with a scandalous rupture, followed by the latter's return to Moscow. In his memoirs, Bely presented an unforgettable, expressionistic, and very partial portrayal of Khodasevich.

During his first years in Berlin, Khodasevich wrote his two last and most metaphysical collections of verse, Heavy Lyre (1923) and European Night (1927). The former contained the most important rendition of the Orpheus theme in Russian poetry, the esoteric Ballad. Khodasevich did not align himself with any of the aesthetic movements of the day, claiming Alexander Pushkin to be his only model. He even penned several scholarly articles exploring the master-stroke of the great Russian poet.

In the mid-1920s, Khodasevich switched his literary activities from poetry to criticism. He joined Mark Aldanov and Alexander Kerensky as the co-editor of the Berlin periodical Days, in which he would publish his penetrating analyses of the contemporary Soviet literature. He also indulged in a prolonged controversy with the Parisian emigre pundits, such as Georgy Adamovich and Georgy Ivanov, on various issues of literary theory. As an influential critic, Khodasevich did his best to encourage the career of Vladimir Nabokov, who would always cherish his memory.

Despite a physical infirmity that gradually took hold of him, Khodasevich worked relentlessly during the last decade of his life. Most notably, he wrote an important biography of Gavrila Derzhavin (translated into English and published by University of Wisconsin Press in 2007) in 1931, which he attempted to style in the language of Pushkin's epoch. Several weeks before Khodasevich's death, his brilliant book of memoirs, Necropolis, was published. Although severely partisan, the book is invaluable for its ingenious and detailed characterizations of Maxim Gorky, Andrei Bely, and Mikhail Gershenzon. He died from cancer of the liver in 1939.

== English translations ==
- Necropolis, Columbia University Press, 2019 (The Russian Library). Translated by Sarah Vitali.
- Khodasevich, Vladislav. 2014. Selected Poems, 1st Edition. Peter Daniels (Translator), Michael Wachtel (Introduction). The Overlook Press. 2014. ISBN 978-1-4683-0810-5 (Parallel text in Russian and English)
- Khodasevich, Vladislav. Derzhavin: A Biography. Angela Brintlinger (Translator). University of Wisconsin Press. 2007. ISBN 978-0-299-22420-2

== See also ==
- Viktor Strazhev
- Georgy Chulkov
