= Jacob Brafman =

Russian-Jewish writer and conspiracy theorist

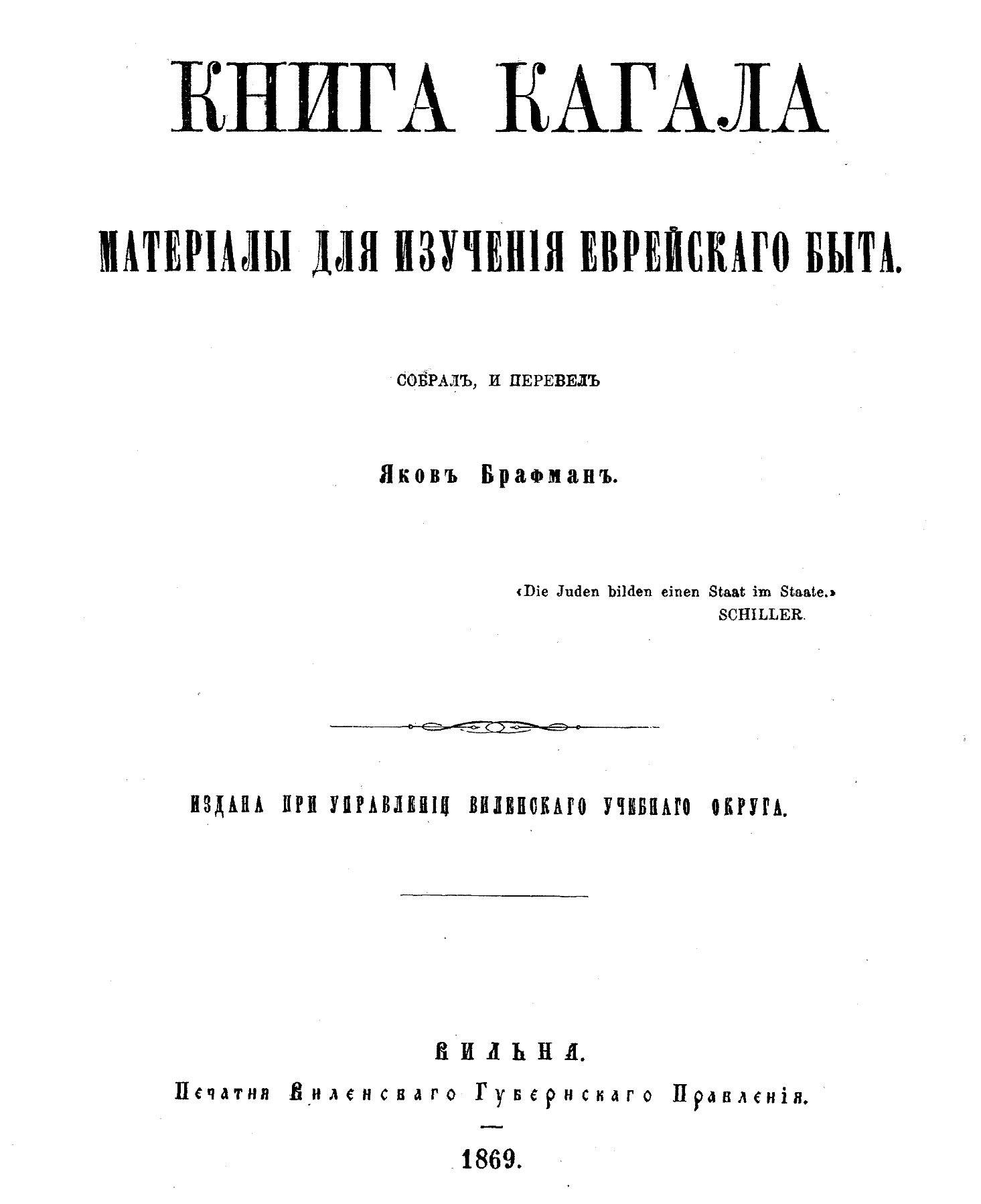
The Book of the Kahal (1869) by Jacob Brafman, in the Russian language original.

Iakov Aleksandrovich Brafman (Russian: Я́ков Алекса́ндрович Бра́фман; 1825 – 28 December 1879), commonly known as Jacob Brafman, was a Lithuanian Jew from near Minsk, who became notable for converting first to Lutheranism and then the Russian Orthodox Church. He advanced conspiracy theories against the Qahal and the Talmud. Brafman's works The Local and Universal Jewish Brotherhoods (1868) and The Book of the Kahal (1869) were foundational texts in establishing a theoretical basis for modern antisemitic thought in Russia and established a framework for themes later covered in The Protocols of the Elders of Zion.

== Background ==
Brafman was born in 1825 and lived in Kletsk, a shtetl near Minsk in the Pale of Settlement. His father was a rabbi. Brafman grew up in poor conditions and was orphaned at a young age, being raised by distant relatives. Because of the poverty in which he was raised, Brafman was not given a substantial or traditional Jewish education. He frequently clashed with the traditional authorities of the shtetl, particularly members of the Chevra kadisha (Burial Society). In one particularly gruesome incident, after his young daughter had died, representatives of the Society demanded a sum beyond his ability to pay, before taking a pillow from the bed of his deceased child as collateral. To avoid military service as a cantonist, Brafman took to the road and failed at a number of professions, eventually fleeing to Minsk, where he tried to establish himself as a photographer.

Once in Minsk, Brafman converted to the Russian Orthodox Church in 1858, and became a missionary, successfully converting a portion of the city's Jews. (There is some evidence of an earlier conversion to Lutheranism, though this is disputed, and it is unclear how sincere such a conversion would have been, as Lutheranism had a notorious reputation as being the "religion of convenience" for insincere Jewish converts, owing to its decentralized character.) There was a state visit to Minsk in that year by Tsar Alexander II of Russia and Brafman submitted a memorandum on how Jews in Russia should best be proselytized into Orthodox Christianity and educated into "useful" subjects. The dichtomy of useful and useless Jews had been established by Tsar Nicholas I of Russia. Nicholas saw "use" in bourgeois Jews who were willing to assimilate into Russian society and could be used in academic and agricultural professions, while seeing as "useless" the poorer adherents of what would today be termed Orthodox Judaism who lived in the shtetls and kept themselves apart from wider society. Brafman proposed the creation of a new missionary society, which would perform all of its work in Yiddish. Further, Brafman offered to personally translate the entirety of the New Testament into Yiddish. Brafman's writing was sent to Saint Petersburg and subsequently earned him the chair of Hebrew Studies at the Minsk Theological Academy in 1860.

== Brafman vs. the qahal ==
Brafman took a leave of absence from the seminary, before traveling to Vilna in 1866. Once there, he began writing a series of articles, collectively titled "The View of a Jewish Convert to Orthodoxy on the Jewish Question in Russia", in Vilenskii Vestnik, an official newspaper, published by the government. Therein, Brafman asserted that the failures of his attempts to convert Jews were caused by the abuses that potential converts would face at the hands of their co-religionists. He also strongly rejected the view of many Russian and Jewish progressives, that Jews would modernize and undergo a significant internal reform if emancipated. In Brafman's view, if prior attempts to reform Judaism had failed, such as the creation of Jewish agricultural communes or the creation of state-sponsored progressive rabbinical seminaries, then obviously they could not be trusted to simply do it on their own. On this point, Brafman differed little from his contemporaries. Many other articles carried in Vilenskii Vestnik routinely castigated the Jews for their failures and internal abuses.

In Brafman's 173rd article, he announced that he had made a discovery, which would become the basis of all his future writings. Prior to Brafman's article, Jewish intransigence had simply been viewed as the byproduct of religious fanaticism and a slavish devotion to the Talmud. Brafman offered a more sophisticated view: the Jews, in the form of the Qahal, had formed a hidden "state within a state". This kingdom, using the Talmud as its basis, allowed Rabbis to act as sovereigns over their fellow Jews and systematically exploit their non-Jewish neighbors. He argued that the mentality of the qahal was the main barrier to Jewish assimilation, as it deliberately made efforts to sustain Jewish separatism, and manipulated non-Jewish governments into aiding them in this task. Virtually every aspect of Jewish life was tied into this conspiratorial understanding of the qahal. Kosher slaughter, for example, was no longer a mere religious observance, but a method of reasserting the authority of the rabbi and collecting funds for the illicit deeds of the qahal. Armed with this theory, Brafman began writing vehemently against the qahal and Jewish organisations more generally. Brafman worked on studying Jewish community books of the qahal from Minsk from the years 1794 and 1833, with his own commentary added to try and prove his thesis; at the same time the Rabbinical Seminary of Vilna was providing their own Russian translation. The combination of the poor translation and overt editing of Brafman led many to doubt the authenticity of these documents, but their authenticity received independent verification in 1875. Brafman published his findings as The Book of the Kahal: Materials for the Study of the Jewish Life (1869). Copies of the book were then sent to many governmental offices throughout the Pale, in order to educate imperial officials about the realities of Jewish life. Brafman joined the Imperial Russian Geographical Society in 1870.

One of the main problems with Brafman's thesis was that the qahal system within the Russian Empire had been dissolved under Nicholas I in 1844. For Brafman he posited a conspiracy theory that the qahal in fact continued to exist as a deep state, with reactionary rabbis working to keep control over the "average Jew" and to undermine Christian business interests at the same time, deliberately working to exclude them from all commercial competition. Brafman suggested that the qahal was able to sustain its own secrecy by having each of its agents act as a spy for other agents of the qahal. This way, if one of them was contemplating revealing the conspiracy, the qahal could blackmail them with evidence of their own various criminal misdeeds. Non-Jews that were aware of the existence of the qahal would simply be bribed into silence. The evidence of the qahal's existence, beyond the documents provided by Brafman, was in Jewish success. Jews, according to Brafman, continued to succeed, despite all of the legal restrictions placed upon them. This could not be the case, unless they had some secret or hidden advantage. Brafman's works accorded well with the Slavophiles then active in Russia and the political theory of Orthodoxy, Autocracy, and Nationality, which sought to distance Russian civilisation from French and British liberalism. Brafman's other major work, The Local and Universal Jewish Brotherhoods (1868), took aim at international Jewish organisations, particularly those based in France. His main object for criticism was the Alliance Israélite Universelle under prominent freemason, Adolphe Crémieux. For Brafman this was the qahal of qahals and, as part of an international Jewish conspiracy, controlled the other qahals. He saw this as the successor of the Grand Sanhedrin (Napoleon's Rabbinic Assembly of 1807).

== Influence ==
Brafman also took aim at the Talmud, claiming that the Jews, using Talmudic principles, would exclude adherents of other religions from trade and industry and would themselves accumulate all capital and landed property. Brafman's works, which included the idea of a secret Jewish shadow government and the aspects of an internationally orchestrated "conspiracy" against all Christian nations, crossing over with masonic involvement, provided an essential framework for what would become The Protocols of the Learned Elders of Zion, authored by agents of the Okhrana at the turn of the 20th century.

Brafman was particularly well received by conservative Slavophiles in Russia. Vsevolod Krestovsky, one of the most widely read Russian writers of the day, was inspired by Brafman to write a trilogy of novels; The Darkness of Egypt, Tamara Bendavid and The Triumph of Baal. For Krestovskii, the qahal of qahals in Paris, with a network of Jewish spies, was used to back up British-French militarism against Russia, causing defeat in the Russo-Turkish War (1877–1878) of the Great Eastern Crisis (British Prime Minister Benjamin Disraeli in particular is singled out as an "arch-villain").

The Book of the Kahal was greeted as one of the most significant developments in the history of the Russian Jewish question. Dozens of journals and newspapers published glowing reviews of the book. For many, already having been exposed to Brafman's ideas through his newspaper articles, the book simply confirmed what they already believed to be true. Syn Otechestva, for example, claimed the book vindicated their earlier argument that Jews should not be emancipated, so long as the Jews remained in control. More than simply review and reprint Brafman's work, however, the response to the book served to institutionalize it, by making it the basis of the language one must use when discussing the Jewish question. Other writers, including many of the editors and translators and collaborators of Brafman, wrote responses to or modifications of Brafman's work. Newspapers began to speculate on the motivations and activities of the qahal, with some even claiming that Jewish leadership did not truly want emancipation for the Jews, as it would lead to the disintegration of the qahal's power. Brafman became more than a singular writer. He was simply the first in a new field.

Hal Draper, an American Trotskyist, in his book Karl Marx's Theory of Revolution claimed that Mikhail Bakunin, one of the Russian founding figures of anarchism, was likely inspired by Brafman's writings on Jews. In the case of Bakunin, in a letter written in December 1871, he made the claim that Jews were a "collective parasite", and claimed that "this world is presently, at the disposal of Marx on the one hand and the Rothschild family on the other," putting a conspiratorial spin on this theme as part of his rivalry with the Marxian socialists of the International Workingmen's Association.

== Family ==
One of Brafman's grandchildren was Vladislav Khodasevich, the Russian poet.

== Cultural references ==
Brafman is mentioned in The Prague Cemetery, the novel by Umberto Eco.

== Works ==
- The Local and Universal Jewish Brotherhoods (1868)
- The Book of the Kahal: Materials for the Study of the Jewish Life (1869)
- The Book of the Kahal: An International Jewish Question (1879)

== See also ==
- Elias von Cyon
- Nicholas Donin
- Anton Margaritha
- Johannes Pfefferkorn
- Samuel Friedrich Brenz
- Johann Andreas Eisenmenger
- Hermann Goedsche
- Francisco de Quevedo – Spanish nobleman, writer and politician (1580–1645) who wrote a satiric tale La Isla de los Monopantos that is believed by some to have been a key influence and source of Biarritz and The Protocols of the Elders of Zion
