= Judah of Melun =

Judah of Melun was a French rabbi and tosafist of the first half of the 13th century. He was the son of the tosafist David of Melun (from the area of Seine-et-Marne).

In Perez of Corbeil's tosafot to Baba Ḳamma (ed. Leghorn, p. 53a) he is quoted under the name "Judah of Melun." After 1224, he took charge of the Talmud school at Melun.

He was one of the four rabbis who defended the Talmud against Nicholas Donin in the public disputation at Paris in 1240.

Simcha Emmanuel suggested identifying him with "Judah of Metz" and "Judah of Meish (Meaux)", individuals mentioned in contemporaneous sources, and suggested the versions 'Metz' and 'Melun' were scribal errors, given that a tombstone of 'Baruch, son of our teacher Judah of Meiush' had been discovered in Orléans. Judah of Metz (or Meaux)'s most notable student was the tosafist Avigdor son of Menahem.
