= Viktor Strazhev =

Viktor Ivanovich Strazhev (27 October 1879, Usolye – 19 October 1950) was a Russian bibliographer, translator, poet and literary critic. He was the author of books of poetry and short stories for children, having participated in the creation of school textbooks in Russian literature. Together with Aleksei Zerchaninov and D. Y. Rayhin, he wrote one of the best textbooks on literature of the 19th century, reprinted many times since 1940.

Strazhev went to high school along with Georgy Chulkov, studying under the guidance of Professors Viktor Hoffman and Vladislav Khodasevich. Graduated in Moscow in 1898, and from the historical-philological faculty of Moscow University in 1902, he worked for the journals Morning of Russia, Russian idea, and Pass. He had his first book of poems Opuscula (Little Stories) published in 1904, and three years later On The Holy Sadness. In 1907, he was elected a member of the Russian Society of Literature, had two collections of lyrics The Way of the Pigeon and Poems, published in 1908 and 1909 respectively, and a poetic response to Alexander Blok in 1919. From 1921, he worked in the People's Commissariat of Education, being awarded the degree of Candidate of Philological Sciences without a thesis in 1944. During the Soviet years, Strazhev engaged himself mainly in teaching.
