= Qahal =

Theocratic organizational structure in ancient Israelite society

The qahal (Hebrew: קהל), sometimes spelled kahal, was a theocratic organizational structure in ancient Israelite society according to the Hebrew Bible, and an Ashkenazi Jewish system of a self-governing community or kehila from medieval Christian Europe (France, Germany, Italy). This was adopted in the Polish–Lithuanian Commonwealth (16th–18th centuries) and its successor states, with an elected council of laymen, the 'qahal', at the helm of each kehila. This institution was exported also further to the east as Jewish settlement advanced. In Poland it was abolished in 1822, and in most of the Russian Empire in 1844.

== Etymology and meaning ==
The Hebrew word qahal, which is a close etymological relation of the name of Qoheleth (Ecclesiastes), comes from a root meaning "convoked [group]"; its Arabic cognate, قَالَ qāla, means to speak. Where the Masoretic Text uses the term qahal, the Septuagint usually uses the Koine Greek term ekklesia, ἐκκλησία, which means "assembly", "gathering", or "congregation", later used for church. In the Book of Numbers, the Septuagint instead uses the term συναγωγή, also meaning "gathering" or "congregation" where the Masoretic Text uses qahal. This last term is the origin of the word for "synagogue" in Hebrew.

Thus, the usual translation of qahal is "congregation" or "assembly", although אֲסֻפּ֑וֹת asuppoṯ, עֲצָרָה ʻaṣārā, עֵדָה ʻēḏā, מוֹעֵד moʻēḏ, מִקְרָא miqrā, and סוֹד soḏ are also usually translated like this. In particular, the Biblical text consistently distinguishes between ʻēḏā and qahal. One passage especially makes the distinction clear; the Book of Leviticus discusses what to do if "the whole Israelite [ʻēḏā] commits a sin and the [qahal] is not aware of it[.]" The Encyclopedia Biblica concludes that the qahal must be a judicial body composed of representatives of the ʻēḏā; in some biblical passages, ʻēḏā is more accurately translated as "swarm".

== Biblical exclusions ==
The Book of Deuteronomy prohibits certain members of the ʻēḏā from taking part in the "qahal of Yahweh". In particular, it excludes mamzers, and men who were forcibly emasculated. The descendants of mamzers, up to the tenth generation, were also prohibited by this law code from taking part in the "qahal of Yahweh".

The term employed in the Septuagint for 'eunuch' (Koine Greek: σπάδωνες, romanized: spadones, lit. 'castrate') most commonly refers to forcibly emasculated men, but it is also used there to denote certain foreign political officials (resembling the meaning of eunuch). This category does not include men who were born without visible testicles (conditions including cryptorchidism), or without a visible penis (conditions including hermaphroditism). There is a dispute, even in traditional Judaism, about whether this prohibited group of men should include those who have become, at some point since their birth, emasculated as the result of a disease.

No explanation of the word mamzer is given in the Masoretic Text, but the Septuagint translates it as "son of a prostitute" (Ancient Greek: wikt:ἐκ πόρνης). In the Talmud, it is suggested that the word mamzer derives from mum zar "a strange blemish", and thus suggesting illicit parentage in some sense. There are differing opinions in the Talmud as to what this consists of, but the universally accepted ruling refers to the offspring of adultery (defined as relations with a married woman) or incest, as defined in the Book of Leviticus.

In the Talmud, there is a fierce dispute about whether or not the term mamzer included a child with a Jewish mother but a non-Jewish or enslaved father (or both); although the Talmud eventually concludes that this is not the case, a number of scholars now suspect that this was actually the original definition of mamzer. Abraham Geiger, a prominent Jewish scholar and rabbi of the mid 19th century, suggested that the etymological origin of mamzer might be me'am zar, "belonging to a foreign people".

The Talmud interprets the exclusion of certain people from the qahal as a prohibition against ordinary Jews marrying such people. Additionally, the biblical reference to the "tenth generation" was interpreted, by the classical rabbis, as an idiom meaning "forever"; thus the Talmud forbids all the descendants - forever - of these people, from being married to ordinary Jews.

== In Poland-Lithuania ==
The legal basis for the existence of kahals in the Polish lands was the Statute of Kalisz of 1264 issued by Duke Bolesław the Pious, which was extended by King Casimir III the Great in 1364 to Jews in towns throughout the whole Polish Kingdom. The kahals were the organising body of the Jewish community in a given locality, and were primarily concerned with the collection of head tax and the exercise of jurisdiction within the community. In the 16th century, the kahals spread to the territory of Ukraine.

Strictly speaking, the qahal was the elected lay leadership of the kehila (community). A qahal had a minimum of 8 members, and in average Jewish communities had a membership of 22–35 individuals. Their executives were elected by the local Jewish community, and consisted of 4 elders (Hebrew: zeqenim) with a further 3–5 honorary members (Hebrew: tovim). There was one qahal for each Jewish community, although smaller kahals were often made subject to larger ones.

These Polish-Lithuanian qahals quickly came to be politically autonomous bodies with major regulatory control over Jewish communities in the region. The qahals acted as autonomous administration within each town, having jurisdiction over the local Jewish population and the legal right to regulate the contact between Poles and Jews in all their social, economical and political aspects. Within the community, they administered commerce, hygiene, sanitation, charity (cf. tzedakah, mitzvot, halukka), Jewish education, application of dietary laws (kashrut), and relations between landlords and their tenants. They provided a number of community facilities, such as a rabbi, a ritual bath (mikveh), and interest-free loans (gemachen). Kahals even had sufficient authority that they could arrange for individuals to be expelled from synagogues, excommunicating them (herem).

However, rich and powerful individuals gradually began to dominate the qahals, abusing their position for their own benefit. As a result, by the 18th century, many ordinary Jews had begun to clamour for the abolition of those institutions. Researchers are still debating to what degree the official abolition of the qahal system (1822 in Congress Poland, and 1844 throughout the Russian Empire) was circumvented by Jewish communities, who had internalised very deeply the spirit of local communal rule and gathered around legal associations such as the Ḥevrā qaddishā (burial society). Some see the qahal-style self-administration reach far into the second half of the nineteenth century; others however, claim that the magnates of Poland and Lithuania had usurped much of the qahal's autonomy well before 1800, and others still see deep inner changes predating even the Polish partitions (1770s-90s). After the 1844 official abolition in the Russian Empire, qahals "continued to exist only in the Baltic region [of Russia]. Afterwards, Jewish communities were only given jurisdiction over religious and charitable affairs, and occasionally over education."

== Conspiracy theories ==
The qahal exists as a theme in the antisemitic conspiracy theory literature. The theme originated with Jacob Brafman, a Lithuanian Jew who had a falling out with Minsk qahal tax-agents, and to get revenge converted first to Lutheranism and then to Russian Orthodoxy, authoring polemics against the Talmud and the qahal. Brafmann authored the books The Local and Universal Jewish Brotherhoods (1868) and The Book of the Kahal (1869), claiming that the qahal was an international network under the control of the Alliance Israélite Universelle, its aim being to undermine Christian entrepreneurs, take over their property and ultimately seizing power. This theory was taken up by anti-Jewish publications in Russia and by some Russian officials, such as P. A. Cherevin and Nikolay Pavlovich Ignatyev, who in the 1880s urged governor-generals of provinces to seek out a supposed "universal Jewish kahal." Brafmann's image of the qahal spread throughout the world, making its way to the United States by 1881, as it was translated by Zénaïde Alexeïevna Ragozin in The Century Magazine. It prepared the groundwork for The Protocols of the Elders of Zion, and the word qahal features in that text. It is also discussed in other conspiracy works such as Edith Starr Miller's Occult Theocrasy (1933), which ties it to the Illuminati.

== See also ==
- Aljama, Spanish name for a Jewish (or Muslim) community in Medieval Spain
- Church (congregation)
- Forbidden relationships in Judaism
- Jewish ghettos in Europe, a neighborhood where Jews lived together.
- Kehilla (modern), early 20th century successors to the Central/Eastern European qahal
- Kenesa
- Shtetl, Yiddish name for Central/Eastern European Jewish settlements
- Synagogue
