= Werner Cohn =

German-American sociologist (1926–2018)

- Born: 1926; Berlin, Germany
- Died: October 19, 2018; Brooklyn, New York

Academic background
- Education: New School for Social Research (PhD, 1956)
- Thesis: The Political Alignments of American Jews

Academic work
- Discipline: Sociology
- Sub-discipline: sociology of Jews and Romani people, political sociology
- Institutions: University of British Columbia

Werner Cohn (1926 – October 19, 2018) was a sociologist who wrote on the sociology of Jews and of Romani people, and political sociology. He was a Professor Emeritus at the University of British Columbia.

== Biography ==
Born in Berlin, Germany, Cohn received his BSS in Sociology from City College (New York) in 1951. He completed his MA (1954) and PhD (1956) at the New School for Social Research. He joined the University of British Columbia's Department of Anthropology and Sociology in 1960 and remained there until taking early retirement in 1986. Cohn's research focused on the sociology of Jews and small political movements, and he developed an interest in researching Romani people. He began his research on this topic in 1966/67 during a sabbatical in France. He continued with his studies of the Romani culture and language and returned to Europe meeting with Romani groups and with many well known scholars of the Romani. Over the years Cohn wrote numerous articles on the Romani in various scholarly journals and in 1973 he wrote The Gypsies which summarized his findings in the field. He died in Brooklyn, New York in 2018.

== Selected works ==
=== Journal articles ===
- — (1958). "Social Stratification and the Charismatic". Midwest Sociologist. 21 (1): 12–18.
- — (1959). "On the Language of Lower-Class Children". School Review. 67 (4): 435–440. doi:10.1086/442513. S2CID 145325869.
- — (1960). "Social Status and the Ambivalence Hypothesis: Some Critical Notes and a Suggestion". American Sociological Review. 25 (4): 508–13. doi:10.2307/2092935. JSTOR 2092935.
- — (1962). "Is Religion Universal? Problems of Definition". Journal for the Scientific Study of Religion. 2 (1): 25–33. doi:10.2307/1384090. JSTOR 1384090.
- — (1967). "'Religion' in Non-Western Cultures?". American Anthropologist. 69 (1). American Anthropological Association: 73–76. doi:10.1525/aa.1967.69.1.02a00100.
- — (1968). "Personality, Pentecostalism, and Glossolalia: A Research Note on Some Unsuccessful Research". Canadian Review of Sociology and Anthropology. 5 (1): 36–39. doi:10.1111/j.1755-618X.1968.tb01168.x.
- — (1969). "Some Comparisons Between Gypsy (North American rom) and American English Kinship Terms". American Anthropologist. 71 (3). American Anthropological Association: 476–482. doi:10.1525/aa.1969.71.3.02a00070.
- — (1970). "La persistance d'un group paria relativement stable: quelques reflexions sur les tsiganes nord-américains". Études tsiganes (in French). 16 (2–3): 3–23.
- — (1972). "Mariage chez les rom nord-américains: quelques conséquences du 'prix de la mariée". Études tsiganes (in French). 18 (2–3): 4–11.
- — (1972). "Marko and Moso, A Gypsy Tale from Canada told by Biga". Gypsy Lore Society. 51 (1–2): 13–27.
- — (1976). "Jewish Outmarriage and Anomie: A Study in the Canadian Syndrome of Polarities". Canadian Review of Sociology and Anthropology. 13 (1): 90–105. doi:10.1111/j.1755-618X.1976.tb00761.x.
- — (1978). "On Inequality in Canada". Canadian Review of Sociology and Anthropology. 15 (3): 399–401. doi:10.1111/j.1755-618X.1978.tb00683.x.
- — (1979). "English and French Canadian Public Opinion on Jews and Israel: Some Poll Data". Canadian Ethnic Studies. 11 (2): 31–48.
- — (1984). "What's in a Name: A Comment on Himmelfarb, Loar, and Mott". Public Opinion Quarterly. 48 (3): 660–665. doi:10.1086/268868.
- — (March 1991). "From Victim to Shylock and Oppressor: The New Image of the Jew in the Trotskyist Movement". Journal of Communist Studies. 7 (1): 45–67. doi:10.1080/13523279108415071.

=== Books ===
- — (1 January 1973). The Gypsies. Addison-Wesley Publishing Company. ISBN 978-0-201-11362-4.
- — (1 January 1995). Partners in Hate: Noam Chomsky and the Holocaust Deniers. Avukah Press. ISBN 978-0-9645897-0-4.
- —. Early Companions (PDF). iUniverse.
