= Nicholas Donin =

13th Century Jewish convert to Christianity

Nicholas Donin (French: Nicolas Donin) of La Rochelle, a Jewish convert to Christianity in early thirteenth-century Paris, is known for his role in the 1240 Disputation of Paris, which resulted in a decree for the public burning of all available manuscripts of the Talmud. Latin sources referred to him as "Rupellus," referring to his native La Rochelle.

== Excommunication ==
In 1225, Donin was excommunicated from the ghetto of Paris by Rabbi Yechiel of Paris. While the precise reason for his excommunication is not known, Yechiel himself claims that it was because Donin had become a Karaite, rejecting the authority of the Talmud along with the Rabbinic tradition of biblical exegesis. After ten years of living in excommunication, Donin was baptized into the Roman Catholic Church and joined the Franciscan Order. Other sources, however, claim that he converted well before meeting Rabbi Yechiel of Paris.

== Disputations ==
=== Authority of Pope Gregory IX ===
In 1238 Donin went to Rome, presented himself before Pope Gregory IX, and denounced the Talmud. Thirty-five articles against the Talmud were drawn up, which Donin charged with making virulent attacks on the Virginity of Mary and the divinity of Jesus.

The Pope was persuaded that the accusations were true and dispatched to the authorities of the Church transcripts of the charges formulated by Donin, accompanied by an order to seize all copies of the Talmud and deposit them with the Dominicans and Franciscans. If an examination corroborated the charges of Donin, the scrolls were to be burned, as they were an "insult to Christianity".

=== Authority of King Louis IX ===
This order was generally ignored, except in France, where the Jews were compelled under pain of death to surrender their Talmuds (March, 1240). Louis IX ordered four of the most distinguished rabbis of France—Yechiel of Paris, Moses of Coucy, Judah of Melun, and Samuel ben Solomon of Château-Thierry—to answer Donin in a public debate. The rabbis were forbidden from denying the holiness of Jesus or Mary, as well as disputing any other central Christian doctrine, and Donin was declared victorious by the Christian officials presiding.

Following the disputation, Louis IX condemned the Talmud to be burned. In 1242, fire was set accordingly to twenty-four carriage loads (ten to twelve-thousand volumes) of written works.

== See also ==
- Criticism of the Talmud
- Jacob Brafman
- Johannes Pfefferkorn

== Bibliography ==
- Solomon ibn Verga, Shevet Yehudah, ed. Wiener, p. 114
- A. Lewin, in Monatsschrift, 1869, pp. 9 et seq.
- Isidore Loeb, in Rev. Et. Juives, i. 247 et seq.
- Johann Christoph Wagenseil, Tela Ignea Satanæ
- Heinrich Graetz, Geschichte vii. 94 et seq.
- Hyam Maccoby, Judaism on Trial (1981, Littman Library of Jewish Civilisation)
- John Friedman, Jean Connell Hoff, Robert Chazen, The Trial of the Talmud: Paris, 1240, (2012 PIMS)
