= Samuel Friedrich Brenz =

Anti-Judaism writer

Samuel Friedrich Brenz (born in Osterburg, in the latter half of the 16th century; date and place of death unknown) was an anti-Judaism writer, himself born Jewish. He converted to Christianity in 1601 in Feuchtwangen, and wrote Jüdischer Abgestreifter Schlangenbalg (The Jewish Serpent's Skin Stripped), in which he bitterly attacked his former coreligionists, whom he accused of hating "the most pious and innocent Jew, Jesus Christ," and in which he denounced their religious literature. This book, divided into seven chapters, was published in Nuremberg in 1614, 1680, and 1715.

Solomon Ẓebi Hirsch of Aufhausen wrote a response in Yiddish, Yudisher teryak (The Jewish Antidote; Hanau, 1615), countering Brenz' accusations. He had it printed also in German and in Hebrew for the use of Christians as well as Jews. A new edition appeared in Altdorf in 1680, and a Latin translation by Johann Wülfer, together with the Schlangenbalg, was published in Nuremberg in 1681. Wülfer strongly defended the Jews against Brenz, criticising him for the plagiarism of Johannes Pfefferkorn that he exposed. A Hebrew translation under the title Ha-Yehudim, by Alexander ben Samuel, is extant in manuscript in the library of the University of Leyden.
