= Anton Margaritha =

16th-century Austrian academic

Anton Margaritha (also known as Antony Margaritha, Anthony Margaritha, Antonius Margarita, Antonius Margaritha) (born ca. 1500) was a sixteenth-century Jewish Hebraist and convert to Christianity. He was a possible source for some of Martin Luther's conception of Judaism.

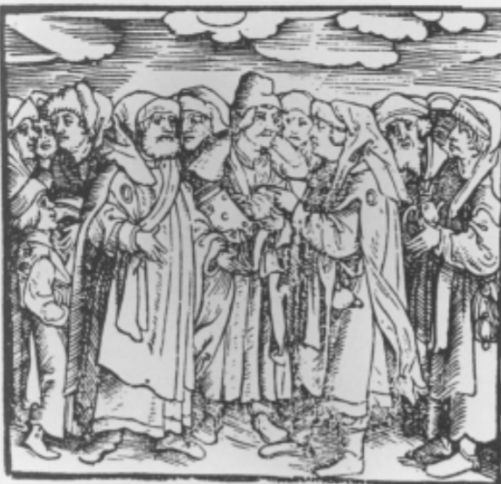
Jews Disputing, woodcut in A. Margaritha, Der Ganz Judisch. Glaub (Augsburg, 1530).

== Biography ==
Anton Margaritha's father, Jacob Margolioth, was a Rabbi in Ratisbon, Germany. Anton converted in 1522, being baptized at Wasserburg am Inn, and later became a Lutheran. He suffered imprisonment and then expulsion from Augsburg due to complaints from the Jewish community there and action by Charles V.

Anton Margaritha was a teacher of Hebrew at Augsburg, Meissen, Zell, Leipzig and from 1537 until his death at the University of Vienna. He published the Psalms and Matthew 1:1 through 3:6 in Hebrew in Leipzig (1533). He is best known for the 1530 book Der gantze Jüdisch Glaub (The Whole Jewish Belief). The 1906 Jewish Encyclopedia commented:

The author ridicules Jewish ceremonies, accuses the Jews of usury and of having sentiments hostile to Christians and Christianity and argues against their Messianic hopes. He also denounces the Aleinu prayer as anti-Christian in tendency. Declaiming against the usury and idleness of the Jews, he appeals to the magistrates to remedy the evil and to force the Jews to perform manual labor. He charges the Jewish physicians with ignorance and greediness and asserts that, despite their minuteness in ritual, the Jews are neither pious nor charitable, and that, notwithstanding their apparent aversion to proselytism, they are eager to gain adherents to their faith. This libelous book had a great influence upon Martin Luther who made use of it in writing his On the Jews and Their Lies ("Von den Juden und Ihren Lügen"). It was praised by Hoornbeck, B. Lutberus and Joseph Müller; but Wagenseil speaks of it less favorably.

He had a public debate in the same year with Josel of Rosheim before Charles V and his court at Augsburg. The dispute terminated in a decisive victory for Josel who obtained Margaritha's expulsion from the realm.

Despite this legal decision, this work would be repeatedly reprinted and cited by antisemites over the coming centuries. Martin Luther read Der Gantze Jüdische Glaube in 1539 before writing his own antisemitic tract On the Jews and Their Lies in 1543. The book was reprinted in 1705 and was cited in Synagoga Judaica (1603) by Johannes Buxtorf.
