= Jewish polemics and apologetics in the Middle Ages =

Jewish polemics and apologetics in the Middle Ages were texts written to protect and dissuade Jewish communities from conversion to Christianity, or more rarely to Islam. The terms polemics (from "battles") and apologetics (from "defence") may be distinguished but may also be considered somewhat subjective. A smaller number of proselytizing text also exists intended to convert Christians, or more rarely Muslims, to Judaism. However, the vast majority of Jewish polemical literature was written in response to Christian polemical writings and with a permanent reference to Christian arguments.

== Under the pre-Christian and Christianizing Roman Empire ==
Defences of Judaism to Greek, Egyptian and Roman religionists are found in Philo's Apology on behalf of the Jews, and Josephus' Against Apion as well as other Hellenistic Jewish authors. In the early centuries following the emergence of Christianity from Judaism, but before Emperor Constantine's legalization of Christianity, mutual Jewish-Christian debate, polemics and apologetics occurred as for example in the words of Rabbi Tarfon and, on the other side, Justin Martyr's Dialogue with Trypho, and the lost Dialogue of Jason and Papiscus (2nd century), and the later Dialogue of Athanasius and Zacchaeus (4th century), Dialogue of Simon and Theophilus (5th century), and Dialogue of Timothy and Aquila (6th century).

== Middle Ages ==
The Middle Ages is generally counted as covering Europe from the 5th to 15th centuries.

=== Under Islam ===
During the Middle Ages many polemical texts originated outside Catholic Europe in lands where Jews and Christians were on an even footing as subjects of Islam. Among the oldest anti-Christian texts with polemic intent is the Toledot Yeshu "Life of Jesus" (7th century), although this does not follow the reasoned format of argument found in a true polemic or apologetic work. The earliest true polemic is the Sefer Nestor Ha-Komer "The Book of Nestor the Priest" (c. 600 CE). The book represents itself as the arguments for Judaism of a former Christian (possibly Nestorian) priest. The need for apologetics emerged as national boundaries were in flux.

Saadia's Kitab al-Amanat wal-I'tikadat "Book of Belief and Opinions" (933) includes refutations of the Christian Trinity, and more restrainedly against Hiwi al-Balkhi's arguments against the Jewish scriptures. The Cairo Genizah fragments include polemics against Samaritans, Christianity, and Islam, as well as Jewish sects, from the early 10th century. Both Jews and Christians under Islam were careful in criticism of, or proselytizing to, their host's religion, in response to Muslim proselytizing of Jews and Christians. Judah Halevi's Arabic Kitab al Khazari "Book of the Khazars" (c 1120), subtitled "The book of refutation and proof on behalf of the despised religion," included apologetics to Islam alongside Christianity and Greek philosophy.

=== In Catholic Europe ===
Jews in Europe began to write polemical works in the 12th century. The Milhamoth ha-Shem "Wars of the Name" of Jacob ben Reuben (12th century) is an apologetic text against conversion by Christians, notable in that it contains questions and answers based on selected Hebrew translations of the Latin Gospel of Matthew and appears to have served as a precedent for the full Hebrew translation and interspersed commentary on Matthew found in Ibn Shaprut's Touchstone (c. 1385).

Joseph Kimhi's Sefer ha-Berit "Book of the covenant" (c. 1150) follows Jacob ben Reuben's format of an apologetic response to Christian argument, but does not only refute Christian challenges, Kimhi also identifies weaknesses of Christian belief.

Around the same period are the Sefer Nizzahon Yashan "The (old) Book of Victory" (in Latin Nizzahon vetus, to distinguish from Prague rabbi Yom-Tov Lipmann-Muhlhausen's 1405 polemical work) a "typical Ashkenazic polemic," and the Sefer Joseph Hamekane "Book of Joseph the Official" of rabbi Joseph ben Nathan (13th century) which presents among other arguments a conversation between a Christian, the 'Chancellor,' and two rabbis. For polemical and apologetic reasons, a wider interest in Christian theology and a desire to acquire the necessary linguistic tools (the study of Latin) seem to emerge during the 13th century. Other apologetic works include Joseph Albo's Sefer Ha-Ikkarim "Book of Principles" (1420), Chasdai Crescas' Or Adonai "Light of the Lord" (1410), Isaac of Troki's Hizzuk emunah "Faith strengthened" (1590).

=== Defences of the Talmud ===
A subcategory of apologetics in the late medieval period is found in necessary Jewish responses to highly dangerous Christian charges concerning material related to Jesus in the Talmud, found in the responses of Yechiel of Paris, Moses of Coucy, and Judah of Melun at the Disputation of Paris (1240), Nachmanides at the Disputation of Barcelona (1263), and Profiat Duran "Shame of the Gentiles" (1375), Joseph Albo (mentioned above) and Astruc HaLevi at the Disputation of Tortosa (1413).

== Renaissance and Counter-Reformation ==
Following the Renaissance the religious landscape of Europe changed with the Reformation and Counter-Reformation. Notable among apologetics of the 17th century was Elijah Montalto, personal physician to Maria de Medici in Paris until his death in 1611, among others such as Menasseh ben Israel, author of Vindiciae Judaeorum whose works were printed by the Jewish community of Amsterdam. Montalto's student Saul Levi Morteira continued in Montalto's tradition of conducting a rational polemical criticism of Christianity. Many polemical works, like Leon of Modena's Magen va-Herev "Shield and Sword", were designed to win back conversos.

== See also ==
- Tovia Singer
- Proselytization and counter-proselytization of Jews
- Jews for Judaism
- Christian polemics and apologetics in the Middle Ages
