= Rabbinical translations of Matthew =

Rabbinical versions of the Gospel of Matthew that are written in Hebrew

The rabbinical translations of Matthew are rabbinical versions of the Gospel of Matthew that are written in Hebrew; Shem Tob's Hebrew Gospel of Matthew, the Du Tillet Matthew, and the Münster Matthew, and which were used in polemical debate with Catholics.

These versions are to be distinguished from the Gospel of the Hebrews which was one or more works found in the Early Church, but surviving only as fragmentary quotations in Greek and Latin texts.

Some scholars consider all the rabbinical versions to be translated from the Greek or Latin of the canonical Matthew, for the purpose of Jewish apologetics. This conclusion is not unanimous. Other scholars have provided linguistic and historic evidence of Shem Tov's Matthew coming from a much earlier Hebrew text that was later translated into Greek and other languages. Early Christian author Papias wrote around the year 100 that, "Matthew composed his history in the Hebrew language, and everyone translated it as he was able".

== Rabbinical Jewish versions ==
=== Early rabbinical citations of Matthew, 600-1300 ===
Quotations from Hebrew translations of portions of various New Testament books - including the epistles of Paul - can be found in rabbinical treatises against Catholicism. These treatises multiplied wherever Jews lived in proximity to Christians - such as Spain before the expulsion of the Jews from Spain in 1492.

- Sefer Nestor ha-Komer; "The Book of Nestor the Priest", 7th century. Contains significant quotes from Matthew, apparently from a Latin text.
- Toledot Yeshu; "Life of Jesus", 7th century.
- Milhamoth ha-Shem; "Wars of the Lord" of Jacob Ben Reuben 12th century, which cites texts including Matthew 1:1-16, 3:13-17, 4:1-11, 5:33-40, 11:25-27, 12:1-8, 26:36-39, 28:16-20.
- Sefer Nizzahon Yashan; "The Book of Victory" (in Latin Nizzahon vetus), 13th century.
- Sefer Joseph Hamekane; "Book of Joseph the Official" of rabbi Joseph ben Nathan, 13th century (Paris MS).
- A 13th century polemical anthology (Paris MS).

Jean Carmignac (Paris 1969, BNES 1978) identified fifty Hebrew translations of the Lord's Prayer from the 9th to the 18th centuries. Most scholars consider that the medieval Hebrew manuscripts are derived by translation from Koiné Greek or Latin manuscripts, and therefore that it is extremely unlikely that any of the unique readings found in these medieval Hebrew manuscripts could be ancient.

Four principal versions in rabbinical Hebrew of Matthew have survived or partially survived:

=== Shem Tov's Matthew, 1385 ===
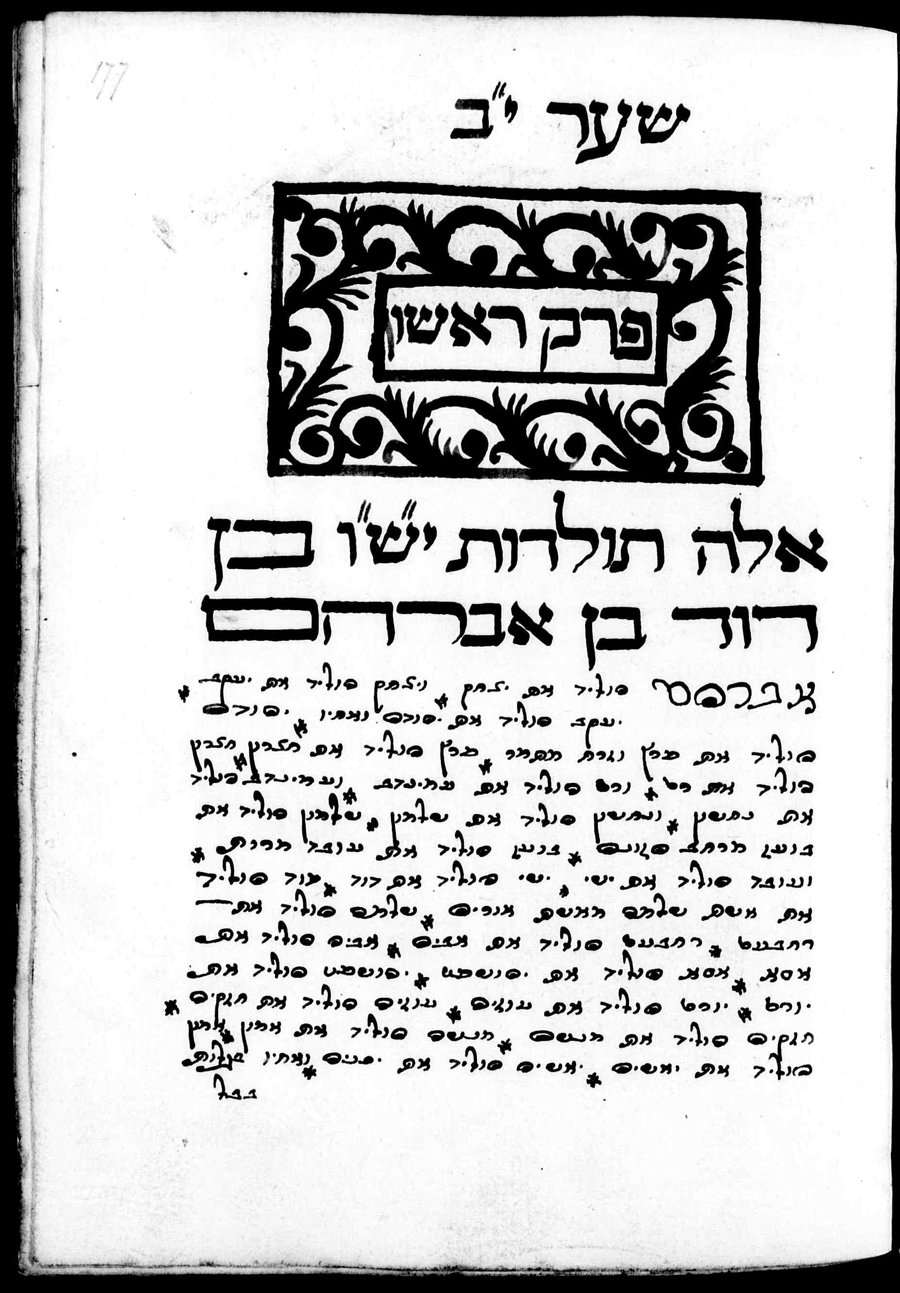
Shem Tov first page

The Shem Tov Matthew (or Shem Tob's Matthew) consists of a complete text of Gospel of Matthew in the Hebrew language found interspersed among anti-Catholic commentary in the 12th volume of a polemical treatise The Touchstone (c.1380-85) by Shem Tov ben Isaac ben Shaprut (Ibn Shaprut), a Jewish physician living in Aragon, after whom the version is named. Shem Tov debated Cardinal Pedro de Luna (later Antipope Benedict XIII) on original sin and redemption in Pamplona, December 26, 1375, in the presence of bishops and learned theologians. Nine manuscripts of The Touchstone survive, though if an independent version of the text of Matthew used by Ibn Shaprut ever existed then it is lost.

Spanish Jews of Ibn Shaprut's period were familiar with the New Testament in Latin. Jacob Ben Reuben in his Wars of the Lord translated Gilbert Crispin's Disputation of Jews and Christians from Latin into Hebrew, along with quotes from Matthew. Lasker (1998) remarks that "By the fourteenth century, most likely every Iberian anti-Christian Jewish polemicist knew Latin." Moses ha-Kohen de Tordesillas made proficient use of Latin phrases. Profiat Duran (fl.1380-1420) had extensive knowledge of Latin Christian texts, and devoted a chapter of his Disgrace of the Gentiles (Klimat ha-goyim) to criticism of Jerome's Latin Vulgate. Hayyim ben Judah ibn Musa argued with Nicholas de Lyra in his Book of Shield and Spear (Sefer magen va-romah). Likewise converts to Christianity such as Abner of Burgos (Alphonso of Valladolid, ca. 1270–1347) continued to write polemical, theological, philosophical, and scientific works in Hebrew.

Shem Tov's The Touchstone (Eben = stone, bohan = test) has never been translated into English or published. It follows the model of Milhamoth ha-Shem of Jacob Ben Reuben in use of Matthew but contains not just sections of Matthew as Jacob Ben Reuben, but the whole text of Matthew and parts of Mark. George Howard excised the text of Matthew from among Shem Tov's comments and published it separately as The Gospel of Matthew according to a primitive Hebrew text (1987), and then a revised second edition Hebrew Gospel of Matthew (1995).

Shem Tov's quotations of Matthew in The Touchstone are marked by Jewish thought, and are interspaced with the comments of the author. As a consequence several scholars feel it is difficult to determine which parts are Shem Tov's commentary, and which parts are the actual text of the source he was quoting. Some scholars view the text as a mediaeval translation from the Greek text of the Gospel of Matthew, as well as being the likely source of all later Hebrew versions of Matthew prior to the 20th century.

Where the Tetragrammaton occurs in Tanakh quotations, instead one finds a single Hebrew He (ה) except in one place where the word "ha-shem" (השם, the name) is spelled out. There are some interesting readings of Matthew in The Touchstone.

- Matt 12:37 "According to your words you will be judged, and according to your deeds you will be convicted."
- Matt 24:40-41 "40 Then if there shall be two ploughing in a field, one righteous and the other evil, the one will be taken and the other left. 41 Two women will be grinding at a mill; one will be taken and the other left. This is because the angels at the end of the world will remove the stumbling blocks from the world and will separate the good from the evil."
- Matt 28:9 "As they were going Jesus passed before them saying: 'May the Name deliver you.'"
- Matt 28:19-20 "Go and teach them to carry out all the things which I have commanded you forever."
- Mark 9:20-28 is placed into the text of Matthew between Matt 17:17 and 17:19. Matt 17:18 is omitted.

While the quotations in Shem Tov's The Touchstone, which are interspersed in his own commentary, diverge from the canonical text of Matthew, the text of the Münster Matthew and the Du Tillet Matthew are significantly close to it in multiple passages.

=== Sebastian Münster's Matthew, 1537 ===
The Münster Matthew is a printed version of the Gospel of Matthew, written in Hebrew published by Sebastian Münster in 1537 and dedicated to King Henry VIII of England. It is disputed as to whether Münster's prefatory language refers to an actual manuscript that he used. Münster's text closely resembles the Du Tillet Matthew. Since the places where Münster altered the text are indeterminate, using the Münster text for textual criticism is problematic.

=== Jean du Tillet's Matthew, 1555 ===
The Du Tillet Matthew is a version of the Gospel of Matthew, written in Hebrew, known as Heb.MSS.132, and residing in the National Library, Paris. The manuscript was obtained by Bishop Jean du Tillet from Italian Jews on a visit to Rome in 1553, and published in 1555, with editing by Jean Mercier (Hebraist) and addition of a Latin version, dedicated to cardinal Charles de Guise. Jean Cinqarbres (Quinquarboreus), Hebrew professor of the College Royal also worked on the Du Tillet Matthew.

While the text is less divergent from the Greek textual tradition than is the Shem Tov Matthew, this version share some deviations in common with the Shem Tov Matthew; for example, the Tetragrammaton is replaced with a sign composed of three yodhs or dots enclosed in a semicircle.

=== Rahabi Ezekiel's Matthew, 1750 ===
Rabbi Rahabi Ezekiel's Ha-sepher shel we-'angilu shel ha-Nosarim shel Yeshu [The book of the Gospel belonging to the followers of Jesus] is a polemical translation of Matthew dating from 1750. This may or may not be the same as the polemical rabbinical Hebrew New Testament of Rabbi Ezekiel bought by Claudius Buchanan in Cochin and known as the "Travancore Hebrew New Testament", which led Buchanan to urge Joseph Frey to commence work on a Christian translation.

== Christian Hebrew versions ==
Around half of the 20 known Christian translations of Matthew were also done by authors who were formerly rabbis, or came from a rabbinical training: Domenico Gerosolimitano and Giovanni Battista Jona, Rudolph Bernhard, Johan Kemper, Simon Rosenbaum (of Uppsala), Christian David Ginsburg and Isaac Salkinson. However the principal modern Hebrew version of Matthew is based on the New Testament of a German, Franz Delitzsch.

== Shem Tov's Touchstone in Christian Aramaic primacy debate ==
The Hebrew and Aramaic primacy hypotheses posits that the Gospel of Matthew was originally written in Hebrew or Aramaic. Scholars who support these hypotheses sometimes appeal to these 3 medieval Hebrew manuscripts. However, the vast majority of scholars believe Matthew was originally written in Greek.

George Howard, Associate Professor of Religion and Hebrew at the University of Georgia has argued (1995) that some or all of these three medieval Hebrew versions may have descended (without any intervening translation) from ancient Hebrew manuscripts of Matthew, which may have been used by early Christians in the 1st or 2nd century, but were nearly extinct by the time of Jerome, late in the 4th century.

However the surviving citations from Jewish-Christian Gospels (namely Gospel of the Nazarenes, Gospel of the Ebionites and Gospel of the Hebrews) preserved in the writings of Jerome, Epiphanius and others, lead critical scholars to conclude that those Gospels themselves either were Greek or were translated from Greek Matthew. In fact, most scholars consider that the medieval Hebrew manuscripts were descended (by translation) from Koiné Greek or Latin manuscripts, and therefore that it is extremely unlikely that any of the unique readings found in these medieval Hebrew manuscripts could be ancient.

Horbury (1999) notes that the characteristics of ibn Shaprut's Touchstone are better explained by the influence of Latin Gospel harmonies.
