= Yeshua =

Alternative form of the name Joshua (Yəhōšūaʿ)

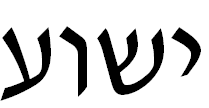
"Yeshua" ישוע, a Hebrew name written with the letters yod-shin-vav-`ayin of the Hebrew alphabet.

Yeshua (Hebrew: יֵשׁוּעַ, romanized: Yēšūaʿ) was a common alternative form of the name Yehoshua (יְהוֹשֻׁעַ, Yəhōšūaʿ, 'Joshua') in later books of the Hebrew Bible and among Jewish people of the Second Temple period. The name corresponds to the Greek spelling Iesous (Ἰησοῦς), from which, through the Latin IESVS/Iesus, comes the English spelling Jesus, with J as the /dʒ/ sound.

The Hebrew spelling Yēšūaʿ (ישוע) appears in some later books of the Hebrew Bible. Once for Joshua the son of Nun, and 28 times for Joshua the High Priest and other priests called Jeshua – although these same priests are also given the spelling Joshua in 11 further instances in the books of Haggai and Zechariah. It differs from the usual Hebrew Bible spelling of Joshua (יְהוֹשֻׁעַ, Yəhōšūaʿ), found 218 times in the Hebrew Bible, in the absence of the consonant he (ה) and placement of the semivowel vav (ו) after, not before, the consonant shin (ש). It also differs from the Hebrew spelling Yeshu (ישו) which is found in Ben-Yehuda Dictionary and used in most secular contexts in Modern Hebrew to refer to Jesus, although the Hebrew spelling Yēšūaʿ (ישוע) is generally used in translations of the New Testament into Hebrew and used by Hebrew-speaking Christians in Israel. The name Yeshua is also used in Hebrew historical texts to refer to other Joshuas recorded in Greek texts such as Jesus ben Ananias and Jesus ben Sira.

In English, the name Yeshua is extensively used by followers of Messianic Judaism, whereas East Syriac Christian denominations render the same four Semitic letters as Ishoʿ (in Syriac written as ܝܼܫܘܿܥ. or ܐܝܼܫܘܿܥ, Īšōʿ) preserving the Syriac Aramaic pronunciation of the name of Jesus. The 2004 film The Passion of the Christ, which was made in Aramaic, used Yeshua as the name of Jesus and is the most well-known western Christian work to have done so. Other works, such as the film Risen from 2016, have also used the name Yeshua for him.

== Etymology ==
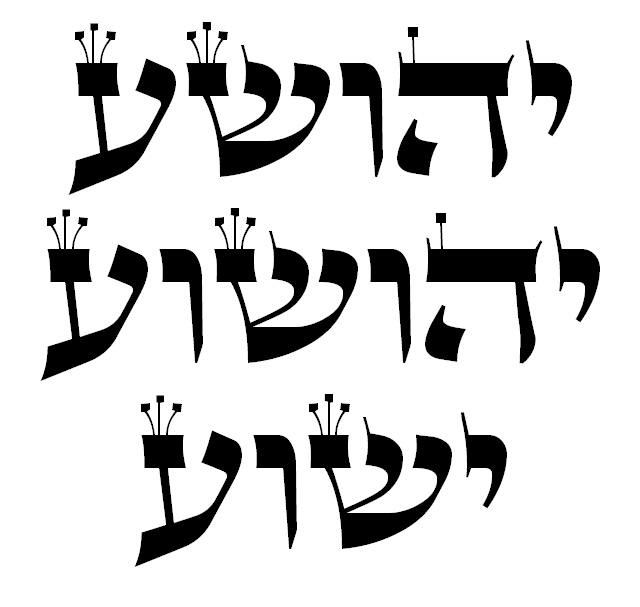
The Greek transliteration Ἰησοῦς (Iēsous) *jesu-os → [jeˈsus] can stand for both Classical Biblical Hebrew Yəhōšūaʿ [jəhoˈʃuaʕ] (top two) and Late Biblical Hebrew Yēšūaʿ [jeˈʃuaʕ] (bottom). This later form developed within Hebrew (not Aramaic). All three spelling variants occur in the Hebrew Bible, including when referring to the same person. During the Second Temple period, Jews of Galilee tended to preserve the traditional spelling, keeping the ו letter for the [o] in the first syllable, even adding another letter for the [u] in the second syllable. However, Jews of Jerusalem tended to spell the name as they pronounced it, [jeˈʃuaʕ], contracting the spelling to ישוע without the [o] letter. Later, Aramaic references to the Hebrew Bible adopted the contracted phonetic form of this Hebrew name as an Aramaic name.

The name יֵשׁוּעַ, Yeshua (transliterated in the English Old Testament as Jeshua), is a late form of the Biblical Hebrew name יְהוֹשֻׁעַ, Yehoshua (Joshua), and spelled with a waw in the second syllable. The Late Biblical Hebrew spellings for earlier names often contracted the theophoric element Yeho- to Yo-. Thus, יהוחנן, Yehochanan, contracted to יוחנן, Yochanan.

Yeshua in Hebrew is a verbal derivative from "to rescue", "to deliver". Among the Jews of the Second Temple period, the Biblical Aramaic/Hebrew name יֵשׁוּעַ, Yēšūaʿ was common: the Hebrew Bible mentions several individuals with this name – while also using their full name Joshua. This name is a feature of biblical books written in the post-Exilic period (Ezra, Nehemiah, and Chronicles) and was found in the Dead Sea Scrolls, though Haggai and Zechariah prefer the spelling Joshua. Strong's Concordance connects the name יֵשׁוּעַ, Yēšūaʿ, in the English form Jeshua (as used in multiple instances in Ezra, Nehemiah, and 1 and 2 Chronicles), with the verb "to deliver" (or, "to rescue"). It is often translated as "He saves," to conform with Matthew 1:21: "She will bear a Son; and you shall call His name Jesus, for He will save His people from their sins".

The name ישוע occurs in the Hebrew of the Old Testament at verses Ezra 2:2, 2:6, 2:36, 2:40, 3:2, 3:8, 3:9, 3:10, 3:18, 4:3, 8:33; Nehemiah 3:19, 7:7, 7:11, 7:39, 7:43, 8:7, 8:17, 9:4, 9:5, 11:26, 12:1, 12:7, 12:8, 12:10, 12:24, 12:26; 1 Chronicles 24:11; and 2 Chronicles 31:15, and also in Aramaic at Ezra 5:2. In Nehemiah 8:17 this name refers to Joshua son of Nun, the successor of Moses, as leader of the Israelites. In earlier English (where adaptations of names of Biblical figures were generally based on the Latin Vulgate forms), Yeshua was generally transcribed identically to "Jesus" in English.

The name Yehoshua has the form of a compound of "Yeho-" and "shua": Yeho- (יְהוֹ) is another form of יָהו, Yahu, a theophoric element standing for the name of God, יהוה (the Tetragrammaton YHWH, sometimes transcribed into English as Yahweh), and שׁוּעַ, shua' is a noun meaning "a cry for help", "a saving cry", that is to say, a shout given when in need of rescue.

Another explanation for the name Yehoshua is that it comes from the root ישע, yod-shin-ʿayin, meaning "to deliver, save, or rescue". According to the Book of Numbers verse 13:16, the name of Joshua, the son of Nun was originally Hosheaʿ (הוֹשֵעַ), and the name Yehoshuaʿ (יְהוֹשֻׁעַ) is usually spelled the same but with a yod added at the beginning. "Hosheaʿ" certainly comes from the root ישע, yasha, yod-shin-ʿayin (in the Hif'il form the yod becomes a waw), and not from the word שוע, šûaʿ.)

In the 1st century, Philo of Alexandria, in a Greek exposition, offered this understanding of Moses's reason for the name change of the biblical hero Jehoshua/Joshua son of Nun from Hoshea (similar to hoshiaʿ, meaning "He rescued") to Yehoshua in commemoration of his salvation: "And Ιησους refers to salvation of the Lord" [Ιησους or Iesous being the Greek form of the name] (Ἰησοῦ δὲ σωτηρία κυρίου) (On the Change of Names 21.121).

Similarly, the Septuagint renders Ben Sira as saying (in the Greek form of the name): "Ιησους the son of Naue [Yehoshua Ben Nun] who according to his name became great unto [the] salvation/deliverance of his chosen ones" (Ἰησοῦς Ναυῆ .. ὃς ἐγένετο κατὰ τὸ ὄνομα αὐτοῦ μέγας ἐπὶ σωτηρίᾳ ἐκλεκτῶν αὐτοῦ) (Ben Sira 46:1–2). However, Ben Sira originally wrote in Hebrew in the second century BC, and the only extant Hebrew manuscript for this passage has "in his days" (בימיו), not "according to his name" (which would be כשמו in Hebrew), and thus does not comment on the name Yehoshua as connoting יְּשׁוּעָה "deliverance": "Yehoshua Ben Nun, who was formed to be in his days a great deliverer for his chosen ones" (יהושע בן נון... אשר נוצר להיות בימיו תשועה גדלה לבחיריו).

== Archaeological evidence ==
Tal Ilan's Lexicon of Jewish Names in Late Antiquity (2002) includes for "Joshua" 85 examples of Hebrew Yēšūaʿ, 15 of Yəhōšūaʿ, and 48 examples of Iesous in Greek inscriptions," with only one Greek variant as Iesoua. One ossuary of the around twenty known with the name Yeshua, Rahmani No.9, discovered by Ezra Sukenik in 1931, has "Yeshu... Yeshua ben Yosef." The "Yeshu..." may have been scratched out. Two Jewish magical incantation bowls have been discovered both bearing variant spellings of Yeshua.

Apart from the "Yeshua... Yeshua ben Yosef" ossuary, the only other known evidence for the existence of a Yeshua form prior to the material related to Jesus in the Talmud, is a graffito which Joachim Jeremias identified in Bethesda in 1966, but which is now filled in.

== Pronunciation ==
In Yēšūaʿ (יֵשוּעַ, [jeˈʃuăʕ]), the Hebrew letter yod (י, /j/ is vocalized with the Hebrew vowel tsere (/e/, a 'long' e like the first syllable of "neighbor" but not diphthongized), rather than with a shva (/ə/, as Y'shua) or segol (/ɛ/, Yesh-shua). The final letter, ayin (ע) is /ʕ/ (a voiced pharyngeal sound not found in Greek or English), sometimes transcribed with the half ring ⟨ʿ ⟩ (Yeshuaʿ ). The final [ăʕ] represents the "patach genuvah" ("furtive" patach), indicating that the consonant ʿayin is pronounced after the a vowel, and the word's stress is moved to the middle syllable (the characteristics of the furtive patach can be seen in other words, such as רוח, [ˈruăħ] 'spirit'). Thus it is pronounced [jeˈʃu.a(ʔ)] in Modern Hebrew.

The Hebrew name of Jesus was probably pronounced Yeshuaʿ, although this is uncertain and depends on the reconstruction of several ancient Hebrew dialects. Talshir suggests, even though Galileans tended to keep the traditional spelling for Yehoshuaʿ יהושוע with waw for /o/, they still pronounced the name similarly to the Judeans, as 'Yeshua' [jeˈʃuaʕ], who tended to spell the name phonetically as ישוע, perhaps reducing the name thus: [jəhoˈʃuaʕ] > [joˈʃuaʕ] > [jeˈʃuaʕ], with the /o/ palatalizing (via dissimilation) before the /ʃ/.

Qimron describes the general linguistic environment of Hebrew dialects by the time of the Dead Sea Scrolls. The articulation of the /h/ (along with other guttural phonemes /ʔ/, /ħ/, and /ʕ/, as well as approximants /j/ and /w/) lenited significantly. Thus Hebrew pronunciations became less stable when two successive vowels were no longer separated by a consonant /h/. The speakers optionally either reduced the two vowels to a single vowel or oppositely expanded them to emphasize each vowel separately, sometimes forming a furtive glide in between, [w] or [j]. For example, the Dead Sea Scrolls spell the Hebrew word ראוי (/rɔˈʔui̯/, 'seen') variously, recording both pronunciations: reduced ראו ([ro]) and expanded ראואי ([rɔˈuwi]).

The Hebrew name Yehoshua generally reduced to Yeshua, but an expanded Yehoshua is possible, especially in Galilee, whose traditional orthography possibly reflects this.

== Original name for Jesus ==
The English name Jesus derives from the Late Latin name Iesus, which transliterates the Koine Greek name Ἰησοῦς Iēsoûs.

In the Septuagint and other Greek-language Jewish texts, such as the writings of Josephus and Philo of Alexandria, Ἰησοῦς (Iēsoûs) is the standard Koine Greek form used to translate both of the Hebrew names: Yehoshua and Yeshua. The Greek Ἰησοῦς or Iēsoûs is also used to represent the name of Joshua son of Nun in the New Testament passages Acts 7:45 and Hebrews 4:8. (It was even used in the Septuagint to translate the name Hoshea in one of the three verses where this referred to Joshua the son of Nun—Deuteronomy 32:44.)

During the second Temple period (beginning 538 BC–70 AD), Yeshua first became a known form of the name Yehoshua. All occurrences of Yeshua in the Hebrew Bible are in 1 Chronicles 24:11, 2 Chronicles 31:15, Ezra, and Nehemiah where it is transliterated into English as Jeshua. Two of these men (Joshua the son of Nun and Joshua the High Priest) are mentioned in other books of the Hebrew Bible where they are instead called Yehoshua (transliterated into English as Joshua).

The earlier form Yehoshua did not disappear, however, and remained in use as well. In the post-exilic books, Joshua the son of Nun is called both Yeshua bin-Nun (Nehemiah 8:17) and Yehoshua (1 Chronicles 7:27). The short form Yeshua was used for Jesus ben Sirach in Hebrew fragments of the Wisdom of Sirach. (Some concern remains over whether these fragments faithfully represent the original Hebrew text or are instead a later translation back into Hebrew.) The earlier form Yehoshua saw revived usage from the Hasmonean period onwards, although the name Yeshua is still found in letters from the time of the Bar Kokhba Revolt (132–135 AD).

In the documentary The Lost Tomb of Jesus, archeologist Amos Kloner stated that the name Yeshua was then a popular form of the name Yehoshua and was "one of the common names in the time of the Second Temple." In discussing whether it was remarkable to find a tomb with the name of Jesus (the particular ossuary in question bears the inscription "Yehuda bar Yeshua"), he pointed out that the name had been found 71 times in burial caves from that time period.

Thus, both the full form Yehoshua and the abbreviated form Yeshua were in use during the Gospel period – and in relation to the same person, as in the Hebrew Bible references to Yehoshua/Yeshua son of Nun, and Yehoshua/Yeshua the high priest in the days of Ezra. An argument in favor of the Hebrew reduced form ישוע, Yeshua, as opposed to Yehoshua, is the Western Syriac language, in which the pronunciation is Yeshuʿ /jeʃuʕ/.

=== East Syriac Ishoʿ ===
Yeshuʿ or Ishoʿ, the Syriac name of Jesus

Aramaic dialects which use the Syriac alphabet write the name as ܝܫܘܥ and render the pronunciation of the same letters as ܝܶܫܽܘܥ Yeshuʿ (Yešūʿ) /jeʃuʕ/ in Serṭō and ܝܼܫܘܿܥ Ishoʿ (Īšōʿ) /iʃoʕ/ in Madnḥāyā. The Aramaic Bibles and the Syriac Peshitta preserve these same spellings. Current scholarly consensus posits that the New Testament texts were translated from the Greek, but this theory is not supported directly at least by the name for Jesus, which is not a simple transliteration of the Greek form as would otherwise be expected, as Greek did not have a "sh" [ʃ] sound, and substituted [s]; and likewise lacked and therefore omitted the final ʿayn ([ʕ]). Moreover, Eusebius (early 4th century) reports that Papias of Hierapolis (early 2nd century) reports that Jesus's disciple Matthew the Evangelist wrote a gospel "in the Hebrew language". (Scholars typically argue the word "Hebrew" in the New Testament refers to Aramaic; however, others have attempted to refute this view.) The Aramaic of the Peshitta does not distinguish between Joshua and Jesus, and the Lexicon of William Jennings gives the same form of ܝܫܘܥ for both names. The Hebrew final letter ʿayin (ע) is equivalent to final ܥ in Syriac varieties of Aramaic. It can be argued that Aramaic speakers who used this name had a continual connection to the Aramaic-speakers in communities founded by the apostles and other students of Jesus, thus independently preserved his historical name Yeshuʿ and the Eastern dialectical Ishoʿ. Those churches following the East Syriac Rite still preserve the name Ishoʿ. However, in certain Eastern Aramaic varieties forms with an initial ʿayn (or its reflex) and an apocopated final ʿayn are attested, such as Classical Mandaic, where the name for Jesus is rendered ʿ-š-u (ࡏࡔࡅ ʿĪšū or ʿĒšu), though the ʿayin is pronounced like a regular long ī or ē.

In the Talmud, only one reference is made to the spelling Yeshuaʿ, in verbatim quotation from the Hebrew Bible regarding Jeshua son of Jozadak (elsewhere called Joshua son of Josedech). The Talmud does refer to several people named Yehoshua from before (e.g. Joshua ben Perachyah) and after Jesus (e.g., Joshua ben Hananiah). In references to Jesus in the Talmud, however, where the name occurs, it is rendered Yeshu, which is a name reserved in Aramaic and Hebrew literature from the early medieval period until today, solely for Jesus, not for other Joshuas. Some scholars, such as Maier (1978), regard the two named "Yeshuʿ" texts in the Talmud (Sanhedrin 43a and 107b) to be later amendments, and not original.

=== Rabbinical commentary on the difference Yeshuʿ/Yeshuaʿ ===
In general rabbinical sources, the name Yeshuʿ is used, and this is the form to which some named references to Jesus in the Talmud as Yeshu occur in some manuscripts of the Babylonian Talmud, though some scholars, such as Maier (1978) have argued that the presence of the name Yeshuʿ in these texts is a late interpolation. Some of the Hebrew sources referencing Yeshu include the Toledot Yeshu, The Book of Nestor the Priest, Jacob ben Reuben's Milhamoth ha-Shem, Sefer Nizzahon Yashan, Sefer Joseph Hamekane, the works of ibn Shaprut, Moses ha-Kohen de Tordesillas, and Hasdai Crescas.

The name Yeshu is unknown in archeological sources and inscriptions, except for one ossuary found in Israel which has an inscription where someone has started to write first "Yeshu.." and then written "Yeshuaʿ bar Yehosef" beneath it. There are 24 other ossuaries to various Yeshuas and Yehoshuas. None of the others have Yeshu. All other "Joshuas" in the Talmud, rabbinical writings, modern Hebrew, are always Yeshua or Yehoshua. There are no undisputed examples of any Aramaic or Hebrew text where Yeshu refers to anyone else than Jesus.

Some of rabbinical sources comment on the reasons for the missing ʿayn from Yeshu, as opposed to the Hebrew Bible Yeshuaʿ and Yehoshuaʿ. Leon Modena argues that it was Jesus himself who made his disciples remove the ʿayn, and that therefore they cannot now restore it. (Modena was a 17th-century polemicist and does not have reliable linguistic evidence for the claim.) A tradition states that the shortening to Yeshu relates to the Y-SH-U of the yimach shemo, "may his name be obliterated." Against this David Flusser suggested that the name Yeshu itself was "in no way abusive," but "almost certainly" a Galilean dialect form of Yeshua. But E.Y. Kutscher showed that the ʿayn was still pronounced in Galilee, refuting a thesis by Paul Kahle.

== See also ==
- Aramaic of Jesus
- Isa (name)
- Joseph (name)
- Josiah
- Tikkun olam
- Yahshua
- Yahshuah
