= Jewish views on Jesus =

Judaism's views on the central figure of Christianity

Adherents of Judaism do not believe that Jesus of Nazareth was the messiah or a prophet, nor do they believe he was the Son of God. In the Jewish perspective, it is believed that the way Christians see Jesus goes against monotheism, a belief in the absolute unity and singularity of God, which is central to Judaism; Judaism sees the worship of a person as a form of idolatry, which is forbidden. Therefore, considering Jesus divine, as “God the Son”, is forbidden. However, early Jewish groups, closer to Jesus’s time, did see him as the messiah, specifically the Nazarenes.

Judaism's rejection of Jesus as the Messiah is based on Jewish eschatology, which holds that the coming of the true messiah will be associated with events that have not yet occurred, such as building the Third Temple, a Messianic Age of peace, and the ingathering of Jews to their homeland.

Judaism does not accept any of the claimed fulfilments of prophecy that Christianity attributes to Jesus.

More recently, particularly since the mid-20th century, Jewish views of Jesus have also been discussed within the context of increasing Jewish-Christian interreligious dialogue, despite their respective particularities, as Jews and Christians seek to recognize their shared spiritual heritage.

== Background ==
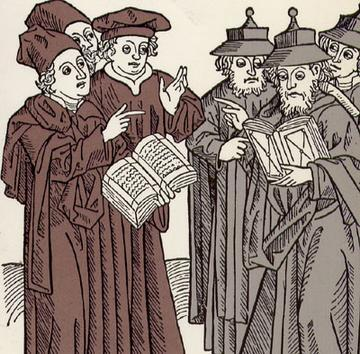
Woodcut carved by Johann von Armssheim (1483). Portrays a disputation between Christian and Jewish scholars

The belief that Jesus is God, the Son of God, or a person of the Trinity, is incompatible with Jewish theology. Jews believe Jesus did not fulfill messianic prophecies that establish the criteria for the coming of the Messiah. Judaism does not accept Jesus as a divine being, an intermediary between humans and God, a messiah, or holy. Belief in the Trinity is also held to be incompatible with Judaism, as are a number of other tenets of Christianity.

=== Jewish theology ===
==== Oneness and indivisibility of God ====
In Judaism, the idea of God as a duality or trinity is heretical – it is even considered by some polytheistic. According to Judaic beliefs, the Torah rules out a trinitarian God in Deuteronomy (6:4): "Hear Israel, the LORD is our God, the LORD is one."

Judaism teaches that it is heretical for any man to claim to be God, part of God, or the literal son of God. The Jerusalem Talmud states explicitly: "If a man claims to be God, he is a liar."

Paul Johnson, in his book A History of the Jews, describes the schism between Jews and Christians caused by a divergence from this principle:

To the question, Was Jesus God or man?, the Christians therefore answered: both. After 70 CE, their answer was unanimous and increasingly emphatic. This made a complete breach with Judaism inevitable.

In the 12th century, the preeminent Jewish scholar Maimonides codified core principles of Modern Judaism, writing "[God], the Cause of all, is one. This does not mean one as in one of a pair, nor one like a species (which encompasses many individuals), nor one as in an object that is made up of many elements, nor as a single simple object that is infinitely divisible. Rather, God is a unity unlike any other possible unity." Some Orthodox Jewish scholars note that the common poetic Jewish expression, "Our Father in Heaven", was used literally by Jesus to refer to God as "his Father in Heaven" (cf. Lord's Prayer).

==== God is not corporeal ====
Maimonides' 13 principles of faith includes the concept that God has no body and that physical concepts do not apply to him. In the "Yigdal" prayer, found towards the beginning of the Jewish prayer books used in synagogues around the world, it states "He has no semblance of a body nor is He corporeal". It is a central tenet of Judaism that God does not have any physical characteristics; that God's essence cannot be fathomed.

== Jesus as the Jewish Messiah ==
Judaism's idea of the messiah differs substantially from the Christian idea of the Messiah. In orthodox Rabbinic Judaism the messiah's task is to bring in the Messianic Age, a one-time event, and a presumed messiah who is killed before completing the task (i.e. compelling all of Israel to walk in the way of Torah, repairing the breaches in observance, fighting the wars of God, building the Temple in its place, gathering in the dispersed exiles of Israel) is not the messiah. Maimonides states,

But if he did not succeed in all this or was killed, he is definitely not the Mashiach promised in the Torah... and God only appointed him in order to test the masses.

Jews believe that the messiah will fulfill the messianic prophecies of the prophets Isaiah and Ezekiel. Judaism interprets Isaiah 11:1 ("And there shall come forth a shoot out of the stock of Jesse, and a twig shall grow forth out of his roots.") to mean that the messiah will be a patrilineal bloodline descendant of King David. He is expected to return the Jews to their homeland and rebuild the Temple, reign as king, and usher in an era of peace and understanding where "the knowledge of God" fills the earth, leading the nations to "end up recognizing the wrongs they did Israel". Ezekiel states the messiah will redeem the Jews.

The Jewish view of Jesus is influenced by the fact that Jesus lived while the Second Temple was standing, and not during an exile. Being conceived via the Holy Spirit (as espoused by orthodox Christian doctrine), it would be impossible for Jesus to be a patrilineal bloodline descendant of King David. He never reigned as king, and there was no subsequent era of peace or great knowledge.

Moreover, Judaism sees Christian claims that Jesus is the textual messiah of the Hebrew Bible as being based on mistranslations, given that Jesus did not fulfill any of the Jewish Messiah qualifications. Jesus died without completing or even accomplishing part of any of the messianic tasks, which Christians say will occur at a Second Coming. Rather than being redeemed, the Jews were subsequently exiled from Judaea, and the Temple destroyed (as of yet it has not been rebuilt). These discrepancies were noted by Jewish scholars who were contemporaries of Jesus, as later pointed out by Nachmanides, who in 1263 observed that Jesus was rejected as the messiah by the rabbis of his time.

=== Prophecy and Jesus ===
According to the Torah (Deuteronomy 13:1–5 and 18:18–22), the criteria for a person to be considered a prophet or speak for God in Judaism are that he must follow the God of Israel (and no other god); he must not describe God differently from how he is known to be from Scripture; he must not advocate change to God's word or state that God has changed his mind and wishes things that contradict his already-stated eternal word. There is no concept of the Messiah "fulfilling the law" to free the Israelites from their duty to maintain the mitzvot in Judaism, as is understood in much of Christianity or some Messianic Judaism.

Deuteronomy 13:1 says, "Be careful to observe only that which I enjoin upon you; neither add to it nor take away from it."

Even if someone who appears to be a prophet can perform supernatural acts or signs, no prophet or dreamer can contradict the laws already stated in the Tanakh. Thus, any divergence espoused by Jesus from the tenets of scriptural Judaism would disqualify him from being considered a prophet in Judaism. This was the view adopted by Jesus' contemporaries, as according to rabbinical tradition as stated in the Talmud (Sotah 48b) "when Malachi died the Prophecy departed from Israel." As Malachi lived centuries before Jesus it is clear that the rabbis of Talmudic times did not view Jesus as a divinely inspired prophet. Furthermore, the Bible itself includes an example of a prophet who could speak directly with God and could work miracles but was "evil", in the form of Balaam.

=== Jesus and salvation ===
Judaism does not share the Christian concept of salvation, as it does not believe people are born in a state of sin. Judaism holds instead that man is born to strive for perfection, and to follow the word of God. Sin is then divided into two categories; transgression against God (through a failure to fulfill ritual obligations, such as not sanctifying the Sabbath), and transgression against man (through a failure to fulfill moral obligations, such as committing gossip). To gain absolution, a person can repent of that sin, regret the sin, and commit to never do the sin again. God will then forgive their transgression against Him, although one may still be punished depending on the severity of the sin. If a sin is committed against man, the person needs to gain forgiveness from the one he sinned against; it cannot be forgiven by God or another person.

== Jesus in rabbinical literature ==
=== The Talmud ===
Various works of classical Jewish rabbinic literature are thought to contain references to Jesus, including some uncensored manuscripts of the Babylonian Talmud and the classical midrash literature written between 250 CE and 700 CE. There is a spectrum of scholarly views on how many of these references are actually to Jesus.

Christian authorities in Europe were largely unaware of possible references to Jesus in the Talmud until 1236, when a convert from Judaism, Nicholas Donin, laid thirty-five formal charges against the Talmud before Pope Gregory IX, and these charges were brought upon rabbi Yechiel of Paris to defend at the Disputation of Paris in 1240. Yechiel's primary defence was that the Yeshu in rabbinic literature was a disciple of Joshua ben Perachiah, and not to be confused with Jesus (Vikkuah Rabbenu Yechiel mi-Paris). At the later Disputation of Barcelona (1263) Catalonian rabbi Nachmanides made the same point.

Jacob ben Meir (11th century), Jehiel ben Solomon Heilprin (17th century), and Jacob Emden (18th century) support this view, but not all rabbis took this view. The Kuzari by Yehuda Halevi (c. 1075–1141), understood these references in Talmud as referring to Jesus of Nazareth based on evidence that Jesus of Nazareth lived 130 years prior to the date that Christians believe he lived. Profiat Duran's anti-Christian polemic Kelimmat ha-Goyim ("Shame of the Gentiles", 1397) makes it evident that Duran gave no credence to Yechiel's theory of two Jesuses.

Modern scholarship on the Talmud has a spectrum of views. From Joseph Klausner, R. Travers Herford and Peter Schäfer, who see some traces of a historical Jesus in the Talmud, to the views of Johann Maier and Jacob Neusner, who consider that there are little or no historical traces and texts have been applied to Jesus in later editing, to others such as Daniel Boyarin (1999), who argue that Jesus in the Talmud is a literary device used by Pharisaic rabbis to comment on their relationship to and with early Jewish Christians.

The Vatican's papal bull issued in 1554 censored the Talmud and other Jewish texts, resulting in the removal of references to Yeshu. No known manuscript of the Jerusalem Talmud makes mention of the name, although one translation (Herford) has added it to Avodah Zarah 2:2 to align it with similar text of Chullin 2:22 in the Tosefta. In the Munich (1342 CE), Paris, and Jewish Theological Seminary of America manuscripts of the Talmud, the appellation Ha-Notzri is added to the last mention of a Yeshu in Sanhedrin 107b and Sotah 47a as well as to the occurrences in Sanhedrin 43a, Sanhedrin 103a, Berachot 17b and Avodah Zarah 16b-17a. Student, Zindler and McKinsey Ha-Notzri is not found in other early pre-censorship partial manuscripts (the Florence, Hamburg and Karlsruhe) where these cover the passages in question.

Although Notzri does not appear in the Tosefta, by the time the Babylonian Talmud was produced, Notzri had become the standard Hebrew word for Christian and the Yeshu Ha-Notzri found in the Talmud has become the controversial rendition of "Jesus the Nazarene" in Hebrew. For example, by 1180 CE the term Yeshu Ha-Notzri can be found in the Maimonides' Mishneh Torah (Hilchos Melachim 11:4, uncensored version).

=== Toledot Yeshu ===
In the Toledot Yeshu the name of Yeshu is taken to mean yimakh shemo (May his name be erased). In all cases of its use, the references to Yeshu are associated with acts or behaviour that are seen as leading Jews away from Judaism to Minuth, or "heresy", "apostasy". Historically, the portrayals of Jesus in the Talmud and Jewish literature were used to justify antisemitic sentiments.

=== Maimonides ===
Maimonides lamented the pains that Jews felt as a result of new faiths that attempted to supplant Judaism, specifically Christianity and Islam. Referring to Jesus, he wrote:

Concerning Jesus of Nazareth who imagined himself to become the Messiah and was put to death by the court, the Prophet Daniel said already: "also the rebellious sons of thy people will lift themselves up to establish the vision; but they will stumble." (Dan.11,14) And can there be a greater stumbling block than this: All the prophets affirmed that the Messiah would redeem Israel, save them, gather their dispersed and strengthen the commandments, but he caused Israel to be destroyed by the sword, their remnants to be dispersed, and humiliated, their changing the Torah, and misleading the world to serve gods besides the Lord.

Nonetheless, Maimonides continued, developing a thought earlier expressed in Judah Halevi's Kuzari,

Yet no man can grasp the thoughts of the Creator of the world, for our ways are not His ways, and our thoughts are not His thoughts; And all these ways of Jesus of Nazareth and of This Ismaelite who rose after him, were only to clear the way for Messiah the King." ... ." when the Messiah will really arise and he will succeed and will reign supreme, at once they shall all return and will know that they inherited lies from their forefathers and that their prophets and forefathers have misled them. (Hilkhot Melakhim 11:10–12.)

==== Epistle to Yemen ====
Jesus is mentioned in Maimonides' Epistle to Yemen, written about 1172 to Rabbi Jacob ben Netan'el al-Fayyumi, head of the Yemenite community:

Ever since the time of Revelation, every despot or slave that has attained to power, be he violent or ignoble, has made it his first aim and his final purpose to destroy our law, and to vitiate our religion, by means of the sword, by violence, or by brute force, such as Amalek, Sisera, Sennacherib, Nebuchadnezzar, Titus, Hadrian, may their bones be ground to dust, and others like them. This is one of the two classes which attempt to foil the Divine will.

The second class consists of the most intelligent and educated among the nations, such as the Syrians, Persians, and Greeks. These also endeavor to demolish our law and to vitiate it by means of arguments which they invent, and by means of controversies which they institute....

After that there arose a new sect which combined the two methods, namely, conquest and controversy, into one, because it believed that this procedure would be more effective in wiping out every trace of the Jewish nation and religion. It, therefore, resolved to lay claim to prophecy and to found a new faith, contrary to our Divine religion, and to contend that it was equally God-given. Thereby it hoped to raise doubts and to create confusion, since one is opposed to the other and both supposedly emanate from a Divine source, which would lead to the destruction of both religions. For such is the remarkable plan contrived by a man who is envious and querulous. He will strive to kill his enemy and to save his own life, but when he finds it impossible to attain his objective, he will devise a scheme whereby they both will be slain.

The first one to have adopted this plan was Jesus the Nazarene, may his bones be ground to dust. He was a Jew because his mother was a Jewess although his father was a Gentile. For in accordance with the principles of our law, a child born of a Jewess and a Gentile, or of a Jewess and a slave, is legitimate. (Yebamot 45a). Jesus is only figuratively termed an illegitimate child. He impelled people to believe that he was a prophet sent by God to clarify perplexities in the Torah, and that he was the Messiah that was predicted by each and every seer. He interpreted the Torah and its precepts in such a fashion as to lead to their total annulment, to the abolition of all its commandments and to the violation of its prohibitions. The sages, of blessed memory, having become aware of his plans before his reputation spread among our people, meted out fitting punishment to him.

== In Karaite Judaism ==
The historical view of Jesus within Karaite Judaism is a complex one. While Karaites share Rabbanite views in rejecting Christian beliefs of Jesus' divinity and claims to messiahship, Karaites throughout history have held warmer opinions about him. Karaite scholar Jacob Qirqisani stated that some Karaites of his day believed that:

Jesus was a good man and his was in the way of Zadok, Anan, and others; and that the Rabbanites conspired against him and killed him just as they sought to kill Anan, without success. This is their way with all who oppose them.

Persian historian and Islamic theologian Al-Shahrastani reported that Karaites believed that Jesus was indeed a righteous man, but was not a prophet, and that the Gospels were not divinely revealed, but created and compiled by Jesus and his disciples. Hakham Abraham Firkovich believed Jesus himself was actually a Karaite. Controversial hakham Seraya Shapshal said:

We call him Yeshua haTzadik, that is, the "Just". For us Christ did not modify the Old Testament. On the contrary, he affirmed it… Christ is for us a great prophet, but not the messiah.

== As a Nazarene ==
In addition to being a place-name, Nazarenes were Jews who committed to certain extreme observances of religious practice, such as shaving their heads and abstaining from various activities, foods or practices, spending time in contemplation in the desert and so on. They continue being recognized as Jews, and believe Jesus lived around 130 or 140 CE and was conflated with Neoplatonic beliefs into what became the New Testament. To them, he was not God or God's son.

== Positive historical re-evaluations ==
Considering the historical Jesus, some modern Jewish thinkers have come to hold a more positive view of Jesus, arguing that he himself did not abandon Judaism and/or that he benefited non-Jews. Among historic Orthodox rabbis holding these views are Jacob Emden, Eliyahu Soloveitchik, and Elijah Benamozegh.

Moses Mendelssohn, as well as some other religious thinkers of the Jewish Enlightenment, held more positive views. Austrian-born philosopher Martin Buber also had Jesus in great regard. A positive view of Jesus is fairly represented among modern Jews in the currents of Reform (Emil G. Hirsch and Kaufmann Kohler), Conservative (Milton Steinberg and Byron Sherwin,), and Jewish Renewal (Zalman Schachter-Shalomi).

Some modern Orthodox rabbis, such as Irving Greenberg and Jonathan Sacks, also hold positive views (Greenberg theorizes Jesus as "a messiah, but not The Messiah").

Rabbi Shmuley Boteach takes this even further, following the research of Hyam Maccoby. Boteach authored Kosher Jesus in 2012, in which he depicts Jesus as "a Jewish patriot murdered by Rome for his struggle on behalf of his people." Opinions of the merits of the book differ, with Israeli-American Rabbi Yechiel Eckstein, President of the International Fellowship of Christians and Jews, praising it as "courageous and thought-provoking". Boteach said that the book "traces the teachings of Jesus to their original sources: the Torah, the Talmud and rabbinic literature".

== See also ==
- Christian–Jewish reconciliation
- Christ myth theory
- Criticism of Christianity
- Rejection of Jesus
- Criticism of Jesus
- Judaism's views on Muhammad
- Jesus in Islam
- Jews for Jesus
- List of messiah claimants
- Messianic Judaism
- Milhamoth ha-Shem
- Nittel Nacht
- Opposition to Christianity in Chazalic literature
- The Book of Nestor the Priest (Sefer Nestor Ha-Komer)
- Sefer Nizzahon Yashan
- Sefer Joseph Hamekane
- The Touchstone of Ibn Shaprut
- Tzoah Rotachat
