= Jacob ben Reuben =

Jacob ben Reuben may refer to:

- Jacob ben Reuben (Karaite), 11th-century Karaite scholar, probably from Constantinople
- Jacob ben Reuben (rabbi), author of a polemical work against Christianity
- Jacob ben Reuben ibn Zur, 18th-century Moroccan rabbi
