= Moses ha-Kohen de Tordesillas =

Spanish Jewish controversialist

Moses ha-Kohen de Tordesillas (fl. 1370s) (Hebrew: משה הכהן) was a Spanish Jewish controversialist of the fourteenth century.

An attempt was made to convert him to Christianity by force. Despite persecution, he remained true to his convictions, although he was robbed of his possessions and reduced to poverty. He was chosen rabbi by the community of Ávila.

He was forcefully made to participate in a religious debate, around the year 1372, with the Jewish convert to Christianity John of Valladolid, in the presence of Christians and Muslims. Moses was acquainted with the Christian sources, and refuted in four debates the arguments of his opponent, who tried to prove the Christian dogmas from the Scriptures.

Soon afterward he was obliged to enter upon a new contest with a disciple of the convert Abner of Burgos, with whose writings, especially with his Mostrador de Jeosticia, Moses was thoroughly acquainted. In 1374, at the desire of the members of his community, he wrote, in the form of a dialogue between a Jew and a Christian, the main substance of his debates, which treated of the Trinity, of the virginity of Mary, of sacrifice, of the alleged new teachings of Jesus and of the New Testament, of the seven weeks of Daniel, and of similar matters. His book, which is divided into seventeen chapters, dealing with 125 passages emphasized by Christian controversialists, is entitled "'Ezer ha-Emunah" (The Support of Faith אמונה). It was sent by its author to David ibn Ya'ish at Toledo, and manuscripts of it are found at Oxford, Berlin, Parma, Breslau, and elsewhere.

Moses ha-Kohen made strong use of the theory in the defence of Yechiel of Paris at the Disputation of Paris in 1240 that there were two Jesuses - the Jesus in the Talmud, and the Jesus of the New Testament. Isidore Loeb (1888) showed that Moses ha-Kohen followed on from the pioneering works such as Shem Tov Shaprut's The Touchstone, Joseph Kimhi's Sefer ha-berit and most of all Jacob ben Reuben's Milhamot ha-Shem. It also shares common ground with later works such as The refutation of the Christian principles of Hasdai Crescas.
