= Khalifa ben Malka =

Moroccan Jewish writer and poet

Personal life
- Born: late 17th century Safi, Morocco
- Died: 15 August 1760 Agadir, Morocco

Religious life
- Religion: Judaism

Khalifa ben Malka (Hebrew: כליפא בן מלכא; died 15 August 1760), also known as the Rakhbam (רכב״ם), was a Moroccan Jewish writer and poet.

== Biography ==
Khalifa was born to a wealthy Jewish family in Safi, Morocco, toward the end of the seventeenth century. He belonged on his mother's side to the Bedersi family of Provence. He was left an orphan at an early age, but with a considerable fortune.

He stayed some time at Fez and studied there under Judah ben Attar and his successor, Samuel Tzarfati. Among his fellow students were Abraham ibn Musa and Jacob Abensur. On his return home he continued his studies with the rabbi Joseph Bueno of Mescuta.

By his "independence of language and manner," Khalifa angered the governor of Safi, and was obliged to take refuge at Agadir, a fortress on the coast. In 1728, a plague devastated this place, and Khalifa lost in one day his wife Deborah and his daughter Estrella. He later lost a great deal of money during a pogrom in 1737, after which he spent some time in Holland and London.

He was regarded as a tzadik, and his tomb in Agadir became a pilgrimage destination for both Jews and Muslims of that city.

== Works ==
- Kaf ve-naki. A commentary on the prayer-book, and poems, several of which are connected with the author's personal adventures.
- Rakh va-tov. A treatise on religious controversy.
