= Evagrius =

Evagrius is the given name of:

- Evagrius of Constantinople (fourth century), bishop of Constantinople (circa 370–380)
- Evagrius of Antioch, bishop of Antioch (388–392)
- Evagrius Ponticus (346–399), Christian mystic
- Evagrius Gallus (5th century), author of the Dialogue of Simon and Theophilus
- Evagrius Scholasticus (6th century), historian
