= Dialogue of Simon and Theophilus =

The Dialogue of Simon and Theophilus (Altercatio Simonis et Theophili) is a 5th-century Latin Christian text giving a dialogue, akin to that of Dialogue with Trypho, between Simon, a Jew, and Theophilus, a Christian. The Altercatio is the oldest surviving Jewish-Christian dialogue preserved in Latin. It has been attributed to, and may even be by, Cyprian. The work draws on earlier Greek and Latin traditions.

Gennadius of Marseille attributes it to a monk named Evagrius.

== See also ==
- Dialogue of Jason and Papiscus (Greek, 2nd century, lost)
- Dialogue of Athanasius and Zacchaeus (Greek, 4th century)
- Dialogue of Timothy and Aquila (Greek, 6th century)
