= David Berger (historian) =

American author & academic (born 1943)

Rabbi David Berger

Personal life
- Education: Yeshiva University

Religious life
- Religion: Judaism
- Denomination: Orthodox

Jewish leader
- Successor: Dr. Daniel Rynhold
- Position: Dean Emeritus of Bernard Revel Graduate School of Jewish Studies Director, Wilf Campus Jewish Studies
- Yeshiva: Yeshiva University
- Semikhah: RIETS

Rabbi David Berger (born 1943) is an American academic, dean emeritus of Yeshiva University's Bernard Revel Graduate School of Jewish Studies, as well as chair of Yeshiva College's Jewish Studies department. He is the author of various books and essays on medieval Jewish apologetics and polemics, as well as having edited the modern critical edition of the medieval polemic text Nizzahon Vetus. Outside academic circles he is best known for The Rebbe, the Messiah, and the Scandal of Orthodox Indifference, a criticism of Chabad messianism.

== Education ==
Berger was raised in Brooklyn, NY, where he attended the Yeshivah of Flatbush for both elementary and high school. He received a Bachelor's degree from Yeshiva College in 1964; he majored in Classics and was class valedictorian. He then went on to Columbia University where he completed a Master of Arts degree in 1965 and his Doctor of Philosophy in 1970. He received rabbinic ordination from the Rabbi Isaac Elchanan Theological Seminary and is a member of the Rabbinical Council of America, the official organization representing Modern Orthodox rabbis.

== Activities ==
Before Berger prominently criticized Chabad messianism, he was most famous as an expert on interfaith dialogue and medieval Jewish-Christian debate. He has written commentaries on the Roman Catholic church's declarations on relations with other faiths Nostra aetate ("In Our Age," promulgated 1965), and Dominus Iesus ("Lord Jesus," promulgated 2000) and Rabbi Joseph Soloveitchik's "Confrontation". The Union of Orthodox Jewish Congregations of America (OU) asked him to write a response to the broadly ecumenical Dabru Emet ("Speak the Truth," 2000), and that response was subsequently adopted as the OU's official position. He has also contributed an essay about Jacob Katz's views on medieval Jewish-Christian debate in the book, Pride of Jacob.

== Chabad controversy ==
Berger's 2001 book criticizing Chabad messianism as "precisely what Jews through the generations have seen as classic, Christian-style false messianism" made him a leading voice in criticism of Chabad. Berger argues that Chabad messianism goes beyond traditional halakhic boundaries of Orthodox Judaism to the point that Orthodox Jews should not participate in prayer quorums with Chabad Jews.. Despite his best efforts, the majority of the Orthodox establishment has not been moved to accept Berger’s call to arms.

== Works ==
=== Books ===
Jews and "Jewish Christianity"

- The Jewish Christian Debate in the High Middle Ages; A Critical Edition of Niẓẓaḥon Vetus. Jewish Publication Society. 1979. ISBN 1-56821-919-9.
- The Rebbe, the Messiah, and the Scandal of Orthodox Indifference, Littman Library of Jewish Civilization, 2001. ISBN 978-1-874774-88-4

Persecution, Polemic, and Dialogue: Essays in Jewish-Christian Relations

Cultures in Collision and Conversation: Essays in the Intellectual History of the Jews David Berger

=== Essays ===
- "On the Uses of History in Medieval Jewish Polemic Against Christianity: The Quest for the Historical Jesus," in Jewish History and Jewish Memory: Essays in Honor of Yosef Hayim Yerushalmi, ed. Elisheva Carlebach, John M. Efron.
- "Jacob Katz on Jews and Christians in the Middle Ages," in The Pride of Jacob: Essay on Jacob Katz and His Work, ed. JM Harris (Cambridge and London, 2002), 41–63,
