= The Rebbe, the Messiah, and the Scandal of Orthodox Indifference =

Book by David Berger

- Author: Rabbi Dr. David Berger
- Language: English
- Publisher: The Littmann Library of Jewish Civilization
- Publication date: 2001
- Pages: 195
- ISBN: 978-1-874774-88-4
- OCLC: 47200311
- Dewey Decimal: 296.3/36 21
- LC Class: BM615 .B37 2001

The Rebbe the Messiah, and the Scandal of Orthodox Indifference is a book by Rabbi Dr. David Berger on the topic of Chabad messianism and the mainstream orthodox Jewish reaction to that trend. Rabbi Berger addresses the Chabad-Messianic question, regarding a dead Messiah, from a halachic perspective. The book is written as a historical narrative of Berger's encounter with Chabad messianism from the time of the death of the Lubavitcher Rebbe, Rabbi Menachem Mendel Schneerson in 1994 through the book's publication in 2001. The narrative is interlaced with Dr. Berger's published articles, written correspondences, and transcribed public lectures, in which he passionately appeals to both the leadership of the Orthodox and Chabad communities for an appropriate response to Chabad-Lubavitch messianism.

== Criticism of Chabad-Lubavitch messianism ==
Berger, an academic expert on Jewish responses to Christianity, particularly claims of Jesus's messiahship and divinity, criticized what he viewed as similar assertions made by some religious leaders of the Chabad-Lubavitch movement about Schneerson shortly after Schneerson's death in 1994 and even in 2014. Berger argues that the assertion a person could begin a messianic mission, die, and posthumously return to complete his mission has been unanimously rejected by the Sages and Jewish polemicists for nearly 2,000 years. An example of Berger's proof-texts is the passage in the Talmud which shows that Rabbi Akiva set aside his previous assertions of Simon Bar Kokhba's presumed messiahship after Bar Kokhba was put to death. To Berger, the Messianists' viewpoint on this issue is outside the pale of accepted Orthodox Jewish belief. Berger has been highly disappointed by the Orthodox establishment's reaction to Chabad-Lubavitch's claims that Schneerson is the Jewish messiah, arguing that there is a "scandal of Orthodox indifference". Despite his best efforts, the majority of the Orthodox establishment has not been moved to accept Berger’s call to arms.

== Support ==
His views are shared and supported by many prominent Orthodox authorities, including the late Rosh yeshiva ("dean") Rabbi Elazar Shach (see Elazar Shach: Opposition to the Lubavitcher Rebbe) and the vehement opposition of the Rabbinical Seminary of America (Yeshivas Chofetz Chaim) in New York City, and that of the Rabbinical Council of America (See Chabad messianism: Rabbinical Council of America.)

Rabbi Aharon Feldman, the dean of the non-Hasidic Yeshiva Ner Yisrael: Ner Israel Rabbinical College in Baltimore, Maryland, wrote a widely disseminated letter in 2004 which stated that Orthodox Jews should avoid praying in Chabad synagogues that avowed a belief in the Rebbe as the Messiah. He stated that while there is nothing in Jewish law stating that the messianist views of Chabad-Lubavitch are heretical per se, they "dig under the foundations of Torah fundamentals" and any support of them should be avoided.

== Conflict over Rav Ahron Soloveichik's position ==
In June 1996, The Jewish Press published a paid advertisement that included a letter with Rabbi Ahron Soloveichik's signature. The letter included the assertion that Soloveitchik believed Schneerson to have been worthy of being Messiah, that the Chabad position that Schneerson was the Messiah could not be dismissed as heretical, and cited a number of sources to demonstrate that he could be the Messiah. The letter also attacked Chabad's critics, and praised Chabad's works.

Many messianists believe that Soloveichik defended their position and bring him as a source to back up their arguments. Yet the letter caused confusion as this was a reversal of Soloveichik's previous position on the matter. In 1994, Soloveichik had told The Forward that Schneerson "can't be the Messiah - he is not living - a Messiah has to be living. A living Messiah, not a dead Messiah." He had also expressed shock at the idea that anyone could suggest that the Messiah could be from among the dead noting that "that could be possible in the Christian faith, but not Judaism" adding that this was "repugnant to everything Judaism represents."

Berger provides a letter from Soloveitchik to a friend in 2000, that resolves the contradiction between his two positions. Soloveichik writes:

To my great dismay. . . publications affiliated with the Lubavitch movement have persisted in stating that I validate their belief that a Jewish Messiah may be resurrected from the dead. I completely reject and vigorously deny any such claim. As I have already stated publicly. . . such a belief is repugnant to Judaism and is the antithesis of the truth. My intent in signing the original letter . . . was merely to express my opinion that we should not label subscribers to these beliefs as heretics. Any statements in that letter which imply an endorsement of their view were not shown to me at the time I signed and I once again repudiate any such ridiculous claim.

== Criticism ==
David Singer, Director of Research for the American Jewish Committee, wrote a critique of the book in First Things, stating, among other things, that Berger has "emerged as a would-be Torquemada on the Orthodox scene, demanding a policy of 'intolerance' and 'exclusion' toward those he deems to be heretical to Orthodoxy." Berger responded at length on the OrthodoxyToday.org website, where Singer's article had been reprinted.

Chaim Rapoport has responded with a book-length critique entitled "The Messiah Problem: Berger, the Angel and the Scandal of Reckless Indiscrimination".

An English language book entitled "Kuntres Shmoi Shel Moshiach" was published by Aharon Yaakov Lieberman which provides an in-depth analysis of what the Sages of the Talmud discussed about the possibility of a resurrected Moshiach. The book received several Rabbinic approbations and wide acclaim from all sections of Orthodoxy.
