= Shem Tob's Hebrew Gospel of Matthew =

Oldest extant Hebrew version of the Gospel of Matthew

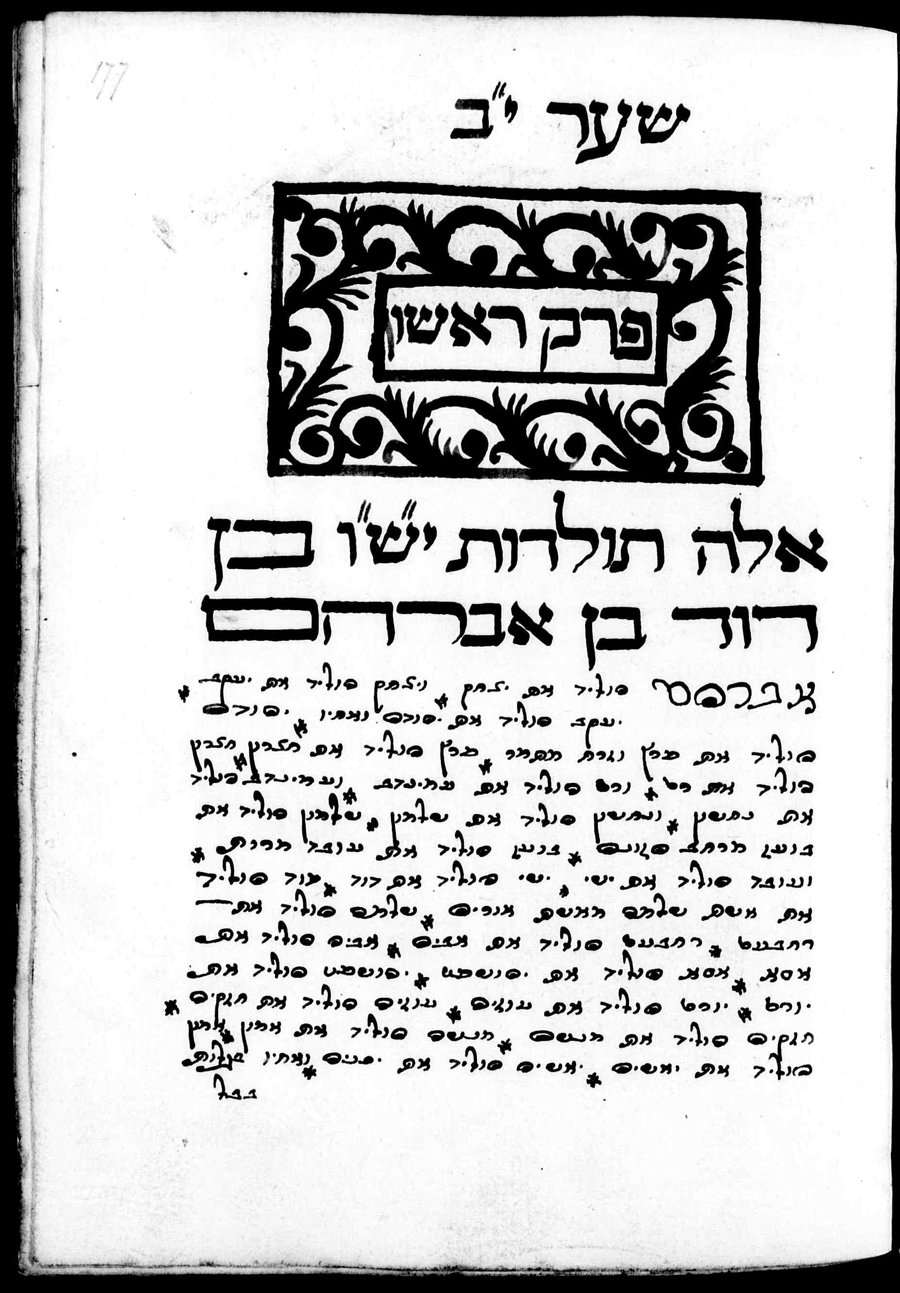
Shem Tov's book first page

Shem Tob's Hebrew Gospel of Matthew is the oldest extant Hebrew version of the Gospel of Matthew. It was included in the 14th-century work Eben Boḥan (The Touchstone) by the Spanish Jewish Rabbi Shem-Tov ben Isaac ben Shaprut. George Howard has argued that Shem Tov's Matthew comes from a much earlier Hebrew text that was later translated into Greek and other languages. A characteristic feature of this Hebrew gospel is the appearance in 20 places of השם (HaShem, "the Name"), in the abbreviated form ה״, where the Gospel of Matthew has Κύριος ("the Lord").

== Origin ==
Shem-Tob ben Isaac Ibn Shaprut was the author of an anti-Christian religious treatise, The Touchstone, completed in 1380 and revised in 1385 and 1400. Often referred to as "The Logic of Shem Tob", it argues against the belief that Jesus is God. It also argues against attributing the role of Messiah to Jesus.

Shem Tob's Hebrew Gospel of Matthew, which is included in this work, is considered the oldest surviving text of a New Testament book in Hebrew.

In 1987, George Howard said (pp. vii, 234) that the translation of the Gospel of Matthew in Shem Tob's work long predates the 14th century and may better represent the original text. His view was rejected by W.L. Petersen and Petri Luomanen.

== Revision of the previous hypothesis and evidences of Medieval and Provençal Origins ==
The main points that are the object of controversy are the following:

1. The oldest version of a gospel in Hebrew language. Hebrew Matthew has been preserved in the book XII or XIII (according to the two recensions of the piece of religious controversy "The Touchstone" of Shem Tob Ibn Shaprut) of the most significant manuscripts which have lasted to our times. The fact of being part of a controversial book involves some problems about authorship, date of the translation and historical context.

2. Identifying marks of the base text or Vorlage. The introduction of the gospel deals with the hypothesis of George Howard, which attributed the version to the genuine Gospel of the Hebrews mentioned by Papias in the second century AD. In the second edition he maintains the antiquity, simply naming it Hebrew Gospel of Matthew and stating this: "The main thrust of this second edition is to demonstrate that the Hebrew Matthew contained in Shem-Tob’s Even Bohan predates the 14th century. In my judgment, Shem-Tob the polemicist did not prepare this text by translating it from the Latin Vulgate, the Byzantine Greek, or any other known edition of the Gospel of Matthew. He received it from previous generations of Jewish scribes and tradents.". Howard had drawn attention to the probable presence of a fragment of the Arabic Diatessaron written by Isaac Ben Velasco in 10th century while W.L. Petersen notices the presence of possible common readings with a Flemish middle ages diatessaron, something which might reinforce a medieval origin for Hebrew Matthew.

3. Controversial manuscripts. The edition of George Howard is based on a manuscript preserved in the British Library, Adler 26964, for Mt 1,1- 23,22 and complemented by the missing final part, 23,23-28,20, with another version from the Theological Seminary of New York (Ms. 2426 [Marx 16]). The critical apparatus with variants of eight manuscripts is correct, and especially truthful, the manuscript of Leiden. However, the edition unfortunately omits those variants that according to Niclós are the most ancient and worthwhile, because they contain words in medieval romance, preserved in manuscripts of Italian libraries. Especially old and correct is the Neofiti Ms, 17,2 of the Vatican Library and the second one, the Plut II, 17 of the Laurenziana Library of Florence. The use of some vocabulary and lexica in Catalan or Pyrenees romance languages raised the option of tracing its Sitz im Leben back to the Middle Ages and more precisely to locate it in the region of Provence and Catalonia. Another paper, later on, studied carefully the Romance lexicon, especially rich in some fields as legal terminology, daily life, trades and roles, as well as cosmology; moreover, the Hebrew syntax of the text concluded with narrative patterns based on correct biblical sequences and some rabbinical linguistic idioms. The result was defined as “an effort of Cultural Restitution to Hebrew: the theology of Matthew’s Gospel, which gathers and compiles many expressions and procedures of the Hebrew Bible, passing through the veil of a Jewish mind of the Middle Ages”. The transcription of the words in the romance language proves the fruitfulness of the choice.

== Ha-Shem ==
Shem Tob's text contains Ha-Shem 19 times:

For ה״, the corresponding Greek Gospel of Matthew text has θεός (22:31), or κύριος (1:22, 24; 2:13, 19; 3:3; 4:7, 10; 21:9, 42; 22:37, 44; 28:2). For one place (5:33) as לה״. Three places it has no corresponding sentence or phrase (21:12; 22:32; 27:9) in NT and OT to contain the word. Once (28:9) it has השם ('name') where the Gospel of Matthew in the Greek New Testament has no corresponding sentence.

It employs not only in Matthew's Old Testament quotations, but also in his narrative, either when introducing such quotations (1:22, 22:31) or in fixed phrases such as "angel of the Lord" (1:24, 2:13, 2:19, 28:2) or "the house of the Lord" (21:12).

As George Howard, referring to Ha-Shem as "the Divine Name", wrote:

The Divine Name occurs in the following situations:

1. In quotations from the Hebrew Bible where the MT contains the Tetragrammaton.
2. In introductions to quotations. For example: 1:22 "All this was to complete what was written by the prophet according to the Lord”; 22:31 "Have you not read concerning the resurrection of the dead that the Lord spoke to you".
3. In such phrases as "angel of the Lord" or "house of the Lord": 2:13 "As they were going, behold the angel of the Lord appeared unto Joseph"; 2:19 "It came to pass when King Herod died the angel of the Lord in a dream to Joseph in Egypt"; 21:12 "Then Jesus entered the house of the Lord"; 28:2 "Then the earth was shaken because the angel of the Lord descended from heaven to the tomb, overturned the stone, and stood still."

== Recent editions and translations ==
The first translation of Shem Tob's Hebrew Gospel of Matthew into English was George Howard's Hebrew Gospel of Matthew, published in 1987. A Polish translation by Eliezer Wolski (Eliyazar Ben Miqra), a Jewish theologian and Chassidic sympathizer, appeared in 2017. He presented the Hebrew text in stylized font imitating first-century Hebrew script. Grzegorz Kaszyński made another translation into Polish and published it along with Howard's English translation and other translations into European languages.

The following table (in Polish) shows how these translations represented the phrase "ha-Shem".

Twenty-two translations of "Ha-Shem" in Shem Tob's Hebrew Gospel of Matthew

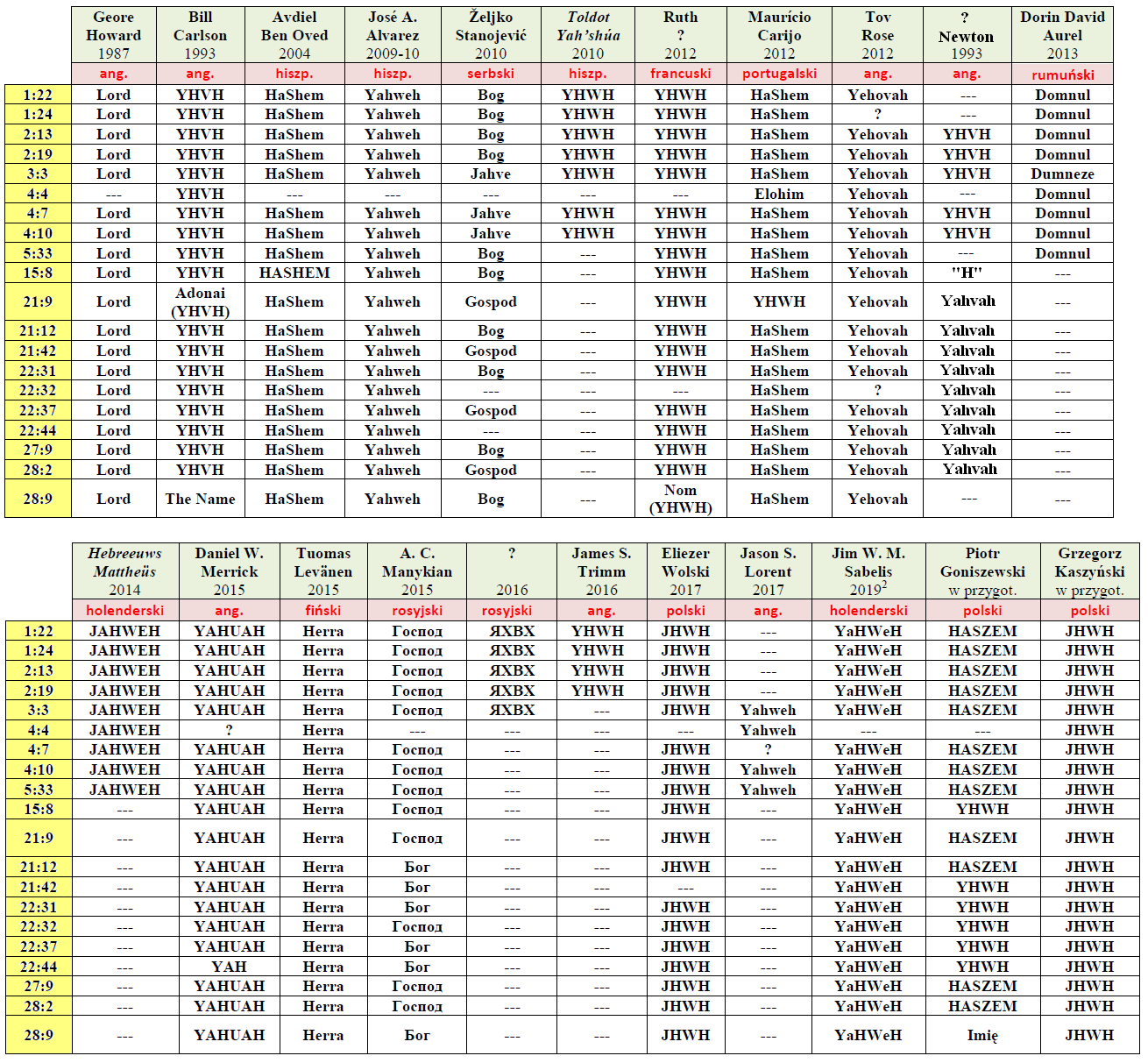

== Extant manuscripts ==
28 manuscripts containing the Gospel of Matthew of Shem Tob are known to have survived until the present time. These manuscripts are dated between the fifteenth and seventeenth centuries. The most significant manuscripts are:

- Ms. British Museum Library Add. No. 26964, London
- Ms. Heb. 28, Rijksuniveriteit Library, Leiden, Netherlands
- Ms. Mich. 119. Bodleian Library, Oxford
- Ms. Oppenheim Add. 4° 72, Bodleian Library, Oxford
- Ms. Oppenheim Add. 4° 111, Bodleian Library, Oxford
- Ms. 2209 (Marx 19), Library of the Jewish Theological Seminary of America, New York
- Ms. 2234 (Marx 15), Library of the Jewish Theological Seminary of America, New York
- Ms. 2279 (Marx 18), Library of the Jewish Theological Seminary of America, New York
- Ms. 2426 (Marx 16), Library of the Jewish Theological Seminary of America, New York
- Ms Vat.ebr.101, Vatican Library

== Translations into other languages ==
There are translations of the Gospel of Matthew from the work of Shem Tob in several European languages. Among them are:

English:

- The Gospel of Matthew According to a Primitive Hebrew Text, George E. Howard (1987)
- Messianic Natzratim Study Bible, Bill Carlson (1993)
- The Book of God: Matthew, Tov Rose (2013)
- Hebrew Matthew Shem Tov (PDF), ? Newton (adatmoadim.com), 2013
- Shem Tov’s Hebrew Matthew: Sacred Name Version, Daniel W. Merrick (2015)
- Hebrew Matthew, vol. One (Chapters 1–12), Jason S. Lorent (2017)

Finnish:

- Evankeliumi Matteuksen mukaan – Shem Tob, Tuomas Levänen (2015)

French:

- Livre de Mattityahou d'apres le texte Hébreu Shem Tov, Ruth ...?... (2012)

Spanish:

- Toldot Iehoshua. La Historia de nuestro Rav el Mashiaj Iehoshua Ben Iosef de Natzrat por: Matityah HaLevi, Avdiel Ben Oved (2004)
- [Toldot Jeshua al-pi Matitjah] / Historia de Yeshúa Según Matityah, José Antonio Álvarez Rivera (2009–2010)
- Evangelio Hebreo de Mateo, versión critica de los 116 capítulos, Eliahu Almani, Oraj HaEmet (2010)
- J. V. NICLÓS ALBARRACÍN, El evangelio de san Mateo en hebreo (en la edición del Eben Bohan de Shem Tob ibn Shaprut), Madrid, 2018

Dutch:

- Hebreeuws Mattheüs (online version), 2014-2023
- Het Mattheüsevangelie (vertaald vanuit het Hebreeuws), 2020

Polish:

- Ewangelia św. Mateusza po hebrajsku, Eliezer Wolski (2017)

In preparation:
- Ewangelia według Mateusza z dzieła Szem-Toba ’Ewen Bōḥan (Kamień Wypróbowany) – wydanie z tekstem hebrajskim, przypisami, Dodatkiem Analitycznym oraz uwypukleniem różnic wobec kanonicznego tekstu, Grzegorz Kaszyński
- Hebrajska Ewangelia według św. Mateusza (Shem Tob), Piotr Goniszewski

Portuguese:

- Evangelho segundo Matityah Shem Tov: História de Yeshu Segundo Matityah de Shem Tov Ben Isaac, Maurício Carijo (2012)
- Torat Yehoshua Segundo o Evangelho Hebraico de Mateus, Bruno Summa, 2019

Romanian:

- Shem Tov Evanghelia Mathyahu ebraic-română-text online, Obedeya Dorin David Aurel Ben Aharon Cohen (chapters 1–12), 2013

Russian:

- Евангелие от Матфея на иврите в издании Шем-Това ибн-Шапрута (с параллельным русским переводом), A.С. Manykian (Манукян), Dniepropietrowsk 2015
- Еврейское Евангелие от Матфея переданное Шем-Товом (chapters 1–3), Eliseus?, 2016

Serbian:

- Jevanđelje po Mateju: preveo sa hebrejskog (PDF), Željko Stanojević, 2010

== Claim of support received ==
The Kingdom Interlinear Translation of the Greek Scriptures (1969), published by the Jehovah's Witnesses' Watchtower Society, refers to Shem Tob's Hebrew Gospel of Matthew (indicated by the siglum J²) in support of its decision to introduce "Jehovah" into the text of the New World Translation of the New Testament.
