= Aristo of Pella =

2nd-century Christian apologist and chronicler

- Born: c. 100 AD; Pella, Arabia Petraea
- Died: c. 160 AD; Pella, Arabia Petraea
- Other name: Aristo Pellaeus (Latin)
- Occupations: Apologist, chronicler

Ariston of Pella (Ancient Greek: Ἀρίστων; Latin: Aristo Pellaeus; c. 100 – c. 160), was an apologist and chronicler, who is known only from a mention by Eusebius that "as Aristo relates" in connection with accounts of emperor Hadrian and Simon bar Kokhba. Aristo is Eusebius's source for Hadrian's permanent banishment of Jews from Jerusalem (4.6.3), renamed to Aelia Capitolina.

"the whole nation from that time was strictly forbidden to set foot on the region about Jerusalem, by the formal decree and enactment of Adrian, who commanded that they should not even from a distance look on their native soil!" So writes Aristo of Pella." Eusebius

Eusebius supplies no biographical data, although some later readers have assumed that like many of Eusebius' sources he was possibly a Greek-speaking Christian.

A secondary mention by the Armenian chronicler Moses of Chorene is probably based on Eusebius, but expanded with the comments that he was secretary of "Ardasches", which were read, or misread, to suggest that Aristo was secretary of Mark, first Gentile bishop of Jerusalem. A mention in the Chronicon Paschale reproduces Eusebius.

His name was connected by Maximus the Confessor (7th century) to the Dialogue of Jason and Papiscus (c.140), although earlier generations either intentionally omitted or did not know the author of that text. This text was also cited by Jerome, leading to confusion in older sources that Jerome mentioned Aristo by name - which he did not. Thus, some scholars consider Maximus' attribution negligible, but many examinations of the dialogue readily accept Aristonian authorship.
