= Jacob ben Reuben (Karaite) =

Jacob ben Reuben (יעקב בן ראובן) was a Karaite scholar and Bible exegete of the eleventh century. He wrote a brief Hebrew language commentary on the entire Bible, which he entitled Sefer ha-'Osher, because, as he says in the introduction, the reader will find therein sufficient information, and will not need to have recourse to the many voluminous commentaries which the author himself had consulted. The book is, in fact, merely a compilation; the author's explanation of any given passage is frequently introduced by the abbreviations or (i.e., Arabic "ma'nahu" or "ya'ni" = "that is to say"); and divergent explanations of other commentators are added one after the other and preceded by the vague phrase ("another says"). It is, in fact, chiefly an extract of Yefet ben Ali's work, from whom Jacob borrowed most of his explanations as well as the quotations from various authors, chiefly on the Pentateuch. But Jacob also drew upon later Karaite authors, the last of whom is Jeshua ben Judah, who, so far as is known, flourished about 1054. This date points to the second half of the eleventh century as the date of composition of the Sefer ha-'Osher.

Among Rabbinitic authors Jacob quotes Abu al-Walid ibn Janah; but his quotations have apparently been intentionally suppressed by Firkovich in his edition, though they are found in the manuscripts, and one of them has been given in the edition (on Jer. iv. 37; fol. 2b, line 1). If Jacob read Abu al-Walid not in the Arabic original but in the Hebrew translation, he must have compiled his book in the second half of the twelfth century. Abraham Firkovich believes Jacob to have lived at Kerch, in southern Russia, said to have been called in Hebrew; and he asserts that the quoted several times in the commentary to the Pentateuch is identical with Abraham ben Simhah of Kerch (c. 986), a personage invented by him. Both of these assumptions are tenuous at best, and most scholars reject them. Jacob was probably a native of Constantinople, as his commentary contains Greek language glosses; and he appears to have been influenced by Byzantine authors.

The Sefer ha-'Osher (as of the beginning of the twentieth century) was found in manuscript at St. Petersburg, Paris, and Leyden. The library of the last-named city is reported to contain two copies of the commentary to the Earlier Prophets and to the twelve Minor Prophets. Another portion, from Jeremiah to Chronicles (except Psalms), was printed, under the general title "Mibḥar Yesharim," together with Aaron ben Joseph's "Mibḥar" to the Earlier Prophets and Isaiah (Koslov, 1835). Steinschneider has edited the introduction; Pinsker has printed passages to the Pentateuch ("Liḳḳuṭe Ḳadmoniyyot," ii. 83 et seq.); and Dukes, passages to the Psalms ("Arch. Isr." 1847; "Orient, Lit." 1850, p. 12). The Sefer ha-'Osher is of no especial importance for Karaitic Bible exegesis, nor, so far as is known, is it mentioned by earlier Karaite authors. But it may have been used by a Hebrew translator or editor of Yefet's commentary to the Minor Prophets. Of the latter work the beginning to Hosea has been edited by Töttermann.

Jacob ben Reuben has been wrongly identified with the Rabbinite translator of the "Liber Lapidum" (by the English bishop Marbod, d. 1123) from the Latin into Hebrew, the translation also bearing the title Sefer ha-'Osher (Steinschneider, l.c. p. 957; Kohut Memorial Volume, p. 56). Further, Jacob must not be confounded with the Rabbinite polemical writer Jacob ben Reuben, author of the anti-Christian work "Milhamot Adonai."
