= Marcus of Jerusalem =

Saint Mark of Jerusalem

Bishop of Aelia Capitolina
- Died: 156
- Venerated in: Catholic Church
- Feast: 22 October

Mark or Mahalia, sixteenth bishop of Jerusalem (served from 135 until his death in 156) was the first non-Jewish bishop of Jerusalem, renamed as Aelia Capitolina.

When the emperor Hadrian banned Jews from Aelia Capitolina, Marcus convinced most of his congregation to cease practicing Jewish laws and customs, thereby obtaining access to the city. The minority who persevered in Jewish ways became the Ebionites.

His secretary was traditionally thought to have been Aristo of Pella, though the Armenian chronicler Movses Khorenatsi’s evidence for this is insufficient, late (7th century) and ambiguous.

He is listed in the Roman Martyrology on Oct. 22. His successor was the Bishop Cassianus of Jerusalem.
