= The Book of Nestor the Priest =

Jewish polemic

The Book of Nestor the Priest, originally titled Account of the Disputation of the Priest (Qissat Mujadalat al-Asquf Arabic: قصة مجادلة الأسقف) or its Hebrew textual avatar Sefer Nestor Ha-Komer (written c. 900 CE) is thought to be the earliest surviving anti-Christian Jewish polemic. The original version of the book was written in Judeo-Arabic, and a translation to Hebrew which confused an opening quote from Nestorius with the name of the author of the book, who is actually unknown. It cites extensively and critically from the New Testament and Church sources. The title komer (כומר) describes a Christian priest (in modern Hebrew the word is used both for Catholic or Orthodox priests and for Protestant ministers), rather than a kohen or Jewish priest. The text is written as the story of a Christian priest (wrongly named Nestor in the Hebrew translation) who converted to Judaism and wrote a critical account of the fundamental Christian doctrine regarding the nature of Jesus and the Trinity. It was also used by Muslim polemic writers against Christianity.

The text uses the spelling Yeshu (ישו) for Jesus.

A modern edition פולמוס נסתור הכומר The Polemic of Nestor the Priest by Daniel J. Lasker and Sarah Stroumsa was published by the Ben-Zvi Institute for the Study of Jewish Communities in the East, 1996.

== See also ==
- Toledot Yeshu
- Milhamoth ha-Shem of Jacob Ben Reuben 12C
- Sefer Nizzahon Yashan or Nizzahon vetus 13C
- Sefer Joseph Hamekane of R. Joseph hen R. Nathan l'official 13C (Paris MS)
- The Touchstone of Ibn Shaprut
