= Shem-Tob ben Isaac of Tortosa =

Shem-Ṭob ben Isaac of Tortosa (1196–?) was a Provençal rabbi and physician.

== Life ==
He was born in Tortosa in 1196. He engaged in commerce, and travelled. Once at Acre, he was reminded by its rabbi of his insufficient knowledge of the Jewish religion; and he left the city (1226), resolving to abandon commerce and to devote himself exclusively to rabbinical and scientific studies. He first studied at Barcelona under Isaac ben Meshullam; then he devoted himself to medicine; and after twenty years' study he became a skilful physician. He lived afterward in Montpellier, France, but chiefly at Marseille, where he practised his profession.

== Translations ==
Shem-Ṭob's first work was his Hebrew translation, under the title of Bi'ur Sefer ha-Nefesh, of Averroes' middle commentary on Aristotle's De Anima.

In the month of Elul, 1254, at the age of fifty-eight, he began the translation into Hebrew of Al-Zahrawi's Kitab al-Taṣrif, a medical work in thirty books. He finished it at Marseille in the month of Nisan, 1258, entitling it Sefer ha-Shimmush. This translation is preceded by a long introduction, which forms a treatise in itself, and in which he deals with man as composed of four elements, and with the relation between diseases and the four seasons of the year.

According to the superstitions of his time, he believed in the influence of the planets on man; and accordingly an entire treatise deals with astrology.

His translation was undertaken with the view of spreading medical science among the Jews, so that they might not be dependent on Christian physicians (comp. 'Ab. Zarah ii.2). The translation is not literal; and in this Shem-Ṭob departed from the method of the earlier translators. As to the various names of diseases and medicaments, Shem-Ṭob employs all that he could find in the Bible and in Talmudic literature. Others he explains in a glossary. He also gives directions to physicians on the treatment of patients and the preparation of medicaments.

In 1264 Shem-Ṭob translated into Hebrew Al-Razi's Al-Manṣuri, a work in ten treatises which that author had dedicated to Al-Manṣur.

Shem-Ṭob states that he also transliterated many Arabic medical works in Hebrew characters in order that Jews might be able to read them. According to De Castro (Biblioteca Española, i.231), Shem-Ṭob of Tortosa was the author also of the Pardes Rimmonim, which is generally attributed to Shem-Ṭob ben Isaac ibn Shaprut. De Castro concludes this from the date 1267, which is given in the Escorial manuscript of the work in question and which is a century earlier than the time of Shem-Ṭob ibn Shaprut.
