= John of Valladolid =

Spanish convert

John of Valladolid (born 1335) was a Spanish Jewish convert to Christianity.

An able speaker, and possessed of some knowledge of rabbinical literature, he persuaded King Henry II of Castile that he could convince the Jews of the truth of Christianity if they were obliged to listen to him and to answer his questions. An order was accordingly issued, compelling the Jews to attend John's lectures in their synagogues and to discuss them with him. In company with another Jewish convert, John traveled throughout the Castilian provinces and lectured and debated in the synagogues, but with lack of success.

At Ávila, he assembled the Jews four times and discussed with them the tenets of Christianity before numerous Christian and Moslem audiences. At Burgos he summoned Moses ha-Kohen of Tordesillas to a religious controversy in the presence of Archbishop Gomez of Toledo.

John endeavored to demonstrate from the Bible the Messianic claims and the divinity of Jesus, and the truth of the dogma of the Trinity and of other Christian doctrines. Thus, for instance, he claimed that the final closed "mem" used in Isaiah ix. 6 is an allusion to the Immaculate Conception. Moses ha-Kohen refuted arguments of this kind, and the controversy was broken off in the middle of the fourth sitting.
