= David ibn Ya'ish =

Spanish Jewish writer

- Occupation: Writer

David ibn Ya'ish (c. 1375) was a Spanish Jewish writer. Moses ha-Kohen de Tordesillas dedicated his work to him. Representative of the community of Seville and contemporary of Asher b. Jehiel. He was probably a brother of Solomon b. Abraham ibn Ya'ish and the father of the Solomon b. David ibn Ya'ish mentioned by Judah b. Asher ("Zikron Yehudah," p. 12a).
