= Giovanni Battista Jona =

Giovanni Battista Jona, originally Judah Jonah of Safed, (d.1678), was a Hebrew writer at the Vatican. Along with the censor Domenico Gerosolimitano he was one of two converted Jewish Scriptens at the Vatican who each produced translations of the New Testament into Hebrew.
