= Opposition to Christianity in Chazalic literature =

Opposition to Christianity in Chazalic literature consists of direct questioning and at times invalidating of Christianity as found in Chazalic literature. Of the notable reasons of Chazalic opposition to Christianity is that Christianity is founded on the belief of the Trinity, whereas Judaism follows the belief of unitarian monotheism. Another source of opposition is the belief that the Torah, as given by Moses, along with its interpretation by Chazal, is the supreme and exclusive indicator of Yahweh's instruction to Jews and mankind.

== Mishnaic sources ==
=== Tosefta ===
References to Christianity are rarely found in Tosefta. A brief mention—albeit allegorically—is found in regards to a Jew who incises his skin on the Shabbat with the intent to engrave a tattoo. The Tanna Rabbi Eliezer is quoted as liableizing (for transgression of Shabbat) the offender for performing one of the activities prohibited on Shabbat, as this is a form of writing. As proof, Rabbi Eliezer cites that "Ben Sitda" stole his knowledge of sorcery from Egypt using this type of writing -hence proving its potency as a viable form of writing. Chazal did not accept Rabbi Eliezer's proof, with the counterclaim of "due to one shoteh (fool) we should make liable all the normal folk?"

Following the debated assumption that Ben Sitida is indeed a reference to Jesus, it is inferable from this mentioning that Jesus -as founder of Christianity- was believed to have used sorcery as a method of achieving supernatural events -a method discounted by Chazal as illegitimate.

== Midrashic sources ==
Midrashic literature contains a number of references to Christianity. Of note is the Midrash's insistence that the rise of Christianity—as well as its illegitimacy as being of service to Yahweh—was foretold to all nations of mankind by Bilaam the sorcerer:

Rabbi Yehoshua ben Levi says; Seventy nations heard the voice of Bilaam. Rabbi Elazer the Kappar says; God gave strength to his (Bilaam's) voice and it travelled from the edge of the world to its (other) edge. Since he viewed and saw the nations that they bow to the Sun and the Moon and stars, to wood and stone -and viewed and saw that there is a man -the son of a woman- that in the future will stand and will seek to make himself a god -to trick the entire world. Thus, (God) gave (super-natural) strength to his voice so that all nations of the world should hear. Likewise he (Bilaam) stated; "give your attention in order that you not err after that man" as it is stated "God is not man -who err's", (thus) if he states that he is a god he is tricking (causing to err). And in the future he will state that he is the son of god. But (in actuality) is only the son of man, as is stated "and the son of man to change" since he will -in the future- misrepresent and say that he is passing on and will come in return; "he said and will not do". Look what is written; "he (Bilaam) carried his parable and said "Oh! who will live from (the sin of) placing him as a G-d?" -said Bilaam, Woe! who will live from that nation that followed after that man that presented himself as a God.

— Yalkut Shimoni to Numbers page 400 (Ha'Maor edition)

=== Midrash HaGadol ===
As the featured Midrashic text of Yemenite Jewry, the Midrash ha-Gadol—in relation to Yeshu—cites the ideal state of Judaism as that where no students or members of the religion "step out" and publicly profess the Rabbinic interpretation of the Torah as invalid.

=== The Zohar ===
In the Zohar, Rabbi Shimon bar Yochai is reported as exclaiming dissatisfaction to those whi forgo the Torah in favor of its antitheses:

Said Rabbi Shimon; Woe to these that leave Torah and go to those who are sweet-talked from the sources of the snake who compel them to "invest effort in those angels that are appointed (by g-d) in charge of the Sun and Moon, and on those (angels) in charge of Spirits and Demons, to be like G-d himself -a knower of good and evil". Regarding them it is said "so says g-d to the (sacrifice) slaughterers and incense offerers" and this is the commandment of God "and from the tree of knowledge -good and evil- you shall not eat from" -and Yeshu the liable in this (nature of activity) he would (actively) engage

— Tikkunei Zohar, Chap. 66

== Talmudic sources ==
The Talmud—relative to other Rabbinic sources—takes a unique approach to Christianity in the sense that in differentiates between Yeshu himself—who is portrayed as a complete Jew wanting to remain under his Rabbi's tutelage—and the religion he ultimately established -which the Talmud frowns upon.

In Sanhedrin 107b and Sotah 47a Yeshu is mentioned as a student of Yehoshua ben Perachya who was sent away for misinterpreting a word that in context should have been understood as referring to the Inn, he instead understood it to mean the innkeeper's wife. His teacher said "Here is a nice Inn", to which he replied "Her eyes are crooked", to which his teacher responded "Is this what your are occupied in?" After several returns for forgiveness he mistook Perachiah's signal to wait a moment as a signal of final rejection, and so he turned to idolatry;

In all circumstances (one should exercise) use the left hand to push (away) and the right (to) bring closeward ..not like Yehoshua ben Perachya who pushed him –to Yeshu- with both hands.. (here the Talmud begins a narration) at the time that Yannai the king was executing the Rabbis, Shimon ben Shatach(‘s sister) hid Rabbi Yehoshua ben Perachya, he (then, subsequently was able to) go and run (escape) to Alexandira of Egypt. When there was (came) and (an era of) peace, Shimon ben Shatach sent to him (a letter:) “from me Yerushalayim the holy city to you Alexander of Egypt -my sister, my husband dwells amongst you and I am sitting lonely” said (Rabbi Yeshushua ben Perachya) “I deduce (from the letter) that he (is enjoying)peace. As he (Rabbi Yehoshua ben Perachya) came they went up to a lodge, (they -at the lodge) stood for him with exemplary honor and did for him extended goodness. He sat and was in the midst of praising 'how beautiful is this lodging', (Yeshu) said to him “My master, her eyes are misshaped”. He said to him “Evil one!, in this you are busy with?!” he brought out four hundred Shofars and excommunicated him.

Every day he would come before him (intent on being readmitted,) and he did not accept him. One day he was reciting Krait Shema, he (Yeshu) came before him (the Rabbi) -it was on his (the Rabbi's) mind to accept him- he (the Rabbi) showed him with his hand, he (Yeshu) thought 'push he is pushing him', (Yeshu then) went erected a fish worship, he (his Rabbi) said to him 'return yourself' he (Yeshu) said to him '(so) I learnt from you; 'all who sin and cause others to sin we do not give (are not given) him the ability to repent'.

— Sotah 47a, Sanhedrin 107

=== Tzoah rotachat ===
Onkelos the son of Klonimus..desired to convert himself (to Judaism)..he brought Yeshu (forth by means of/in) Séance..(Onkelos queried to Yeshu) whom is of importance in that world? He (Yeshu) answered him; Yisroel (the children of Israel). (Onkelos further queried) what/how (do you advise) to cleave to them? He (Yeshu) answered; "their benefit (lit. goodness) seek, their harm (lit. evil) do not seek (as) all/whomever touches them (with intent to harm) is as if (he) is touching the pupil of his (g-d's) eye". He (Onkelos) said to him (to Yeshu); the judgement of that man is how/what? he (Yeshu) said to him (to Onkelos) "in excrement (that is) boiling".

(the Talmud goes on to praise the fact that Yeshu -as a Jew- spoke favorably about his Jewish brethren, as opposed to Onkelos's preceding dialogue with Titus and Bilaam who both advised Onkelos to provoke the Jews;) "come and see (the stark) difference between (even those) sinners of Israel and the prophets of those nations who worship idols" (i.e. even a "sinner of Israel" is of superior spiritual quality than the prophet of idolatry)

— Babylonian Talmud, Gittin 57a

=== Ben Sitida and Ben Pandira ===
(The Talmud queries; Is he really) The son of Sitida? the son of Pandira (the common understanding is that he is the son of Pandira)! Rav Chisda said (explains the seeming contradiction); The husband was/is Sitida (but the) lover was/is Pandira. (The Talmud states as fact): (the true) Husband (is/was) Pappus Ben Yehuda. (so then, if his mother's true husband and his biological father where both not called Sitida then why is he called "the son of Sitida"?). Only (as the explanation of the contradiction) say, his mother was Sitida, (The Talmud further queries how this is plausible since) his mother (was called) Miriam (who) grow's/grew [the hair of] women, (at this point the Talmud gives a final explanation to resolve the reasoning of him being called "The son of Sitida") As is said (explained) in Pumbedita; "She strayed from her husband"

— Sanhedrin 67a

== See also ==
- Judaism's view of Jesus
- Jesus in the Talmud
