= George Howard (Hebraist) =

American Hebraist (1935-2018)

George Eulan Howard
- Born: June 3, 1935; Holdenville, Oklahoma
- Died: November 21, 2018 (aged 83)
- Occupation: Biblical scholar

Academic background
- Education: Hebrew Union College
- Thesis: The LXX Book of Amos (1963)

Academic work
- Discipline: New Testament scholar
- Sub-discipline: New Testament and Early Christian Literature, Greek and Semitic Languages, Intertestamental Studies
- Institutions: University of Georgia
- Main interests: New Testament, Bible, Shem Tob's Hebrew Gospel of Matthew
- Notable works: Hebrew Gospel of Matthew; The Tetragram and the New Testament

George Eulan Howard (June 3, 1935 – November 21, 2018) was an American Hebraist, noted for his publication of an old Hebrew edition of Matthew. He was a full Professor Emeritus and Head of the Department of Religion and Hebrew (Ret.) at the University of Georgia, Athens, GA. Howard also was a former President of the Society of Biblical Literature, Southeastern Region.

== Life ==
Howard was born in Holdenville, Oklahoma.

=== Education ===
Howard received a bachelor's degree from David Lipscomb College (Nashville) in 1957, a master's degree in theology from Harding School of Theology (Memphis) in 1961, and a PhD from Hebrew Union College-Jewish Institute of Religion in 1964. He also studied at Vanderbilt and the Hebrew University of Jerusalem.

== Academic work ==
=== Teaching ===
He first taught at David Lipscomb College (from 1964 as Assistant Professor for Religion, 1967 Associate Professor) before moving to the University of Georgia in 1968 as Assistant Professor of Classics. There he was appointed Associate Professor for Religion in 1972 and (Full) Professor in 1978.

=== Organizations ===
Howard was Treasurer of the International Organization for Septuagint and Cognate Studies (IOSCS) from 1972 to 1974. Due to Sidney Jellicoe's illness, Howard was temporarily editor of the Bulletin of the International Organization for Septuagint and Cognate Studies, and from 1973 to 1979 (Bulletin 6 through 12) Howard was editor of BIOSCS. In the Society of Biblical Literature Howard was chairman from 1977 to 1979, a member of the editorial board from 1979 to 1981, president of the Southeastern region from 1980 to 1981 and vice president of the Southeastern region from 1982 to 1984.

== Works ==
=== Theses ===
- Howard, George (1959). An exegesis of Romans 11:25-26a: "and so shall all Israel be saved" (M.A. Thesis/dissertation. Harding College). OCLC 20374642.
- Howard, George (1963). The LXX Book of Amos (Ph.D Thesis/dissertation. Hebrew Union College-Jewish Institute of Religion, Cincinnati). Cincinnati. OCLC 959381671.

=== Books ===
- Howard, George (1971). Frank Cross and Recensional Criticism. Leiden, the International Organization of Old Testament Scholars. OCLC 17910892.
- Howard, George (1978). Paul: Crisis in Galatia: A Study in Early Christian Theology. Monograph series (Society for New Testament Studies). Vol. 35. Cambridge; New York: Cambridge University Press. ISBN 0521217091. OCLC 3630483.
- Labubnā bar Sennāḳ; George Howard (1981). The teaching of Addai. Texts and translations, no. 16.; Texts and translations., Early Christian literature series;, 4. Chico, Calif.: Scholars Press. ISBN 9780891304906. OCLC 7551329.
- אבן שפרוט, שם טוב; George Howard; Shem Ṭov Ibn Shapruṭ (1987). The Gospel of Matthew according to a primitive Hebrew text. Macon, Ga.: Mercer University Press. ISBN 9780865542501. OCLC 16352448.
- George Howard; Shem Ṭov Ibn Shapruṭ; Mazal Holocaust Collection (1995). Hebrew Gospel of Matthew (2 ed.). Macon, GA: Mercer University. ISBN 9780865544420. OCLC 32508844.

=== Articles ===
- Howard, George (March 1977). "The Tetragram and the New Testament" (PDF). Journal of Biblical Literature. 96 (1). The Society of Biblical Literature: 63–83. doi:10.2307/3265328. JSTOR 3265328.
