= Jean Mercier (Hebraist) =

1510–1570 French Hebraist

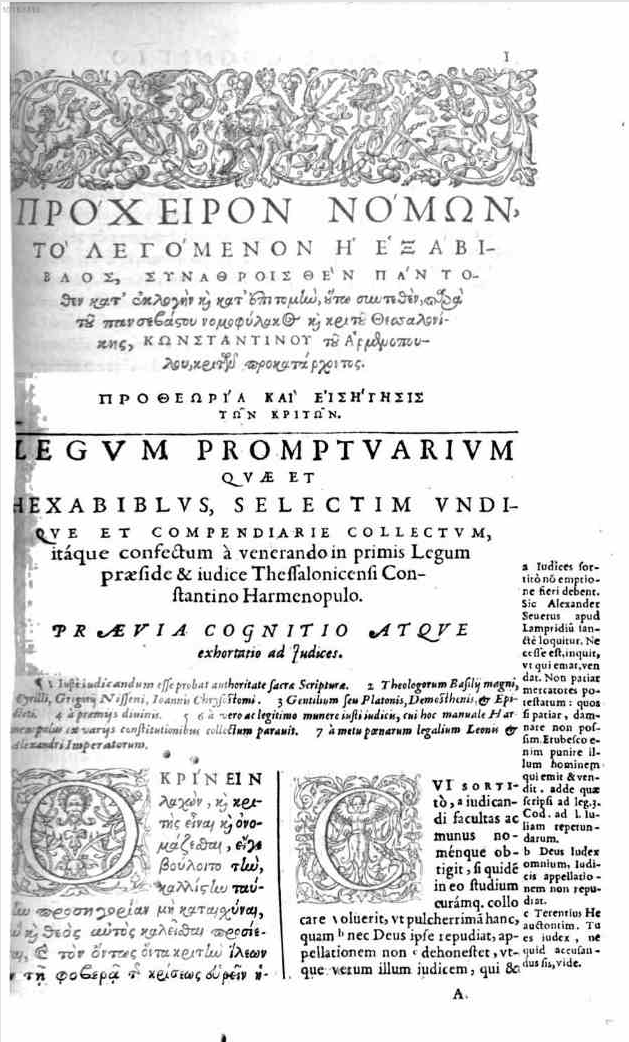
Front page of the Procheiron or Hexabiblos of Constantine Harmenopoulos(1320 - 1380/1385), Lyon 1587 edition by Jean Mercier, translated to Latin from Byzantine Greek.

Jean Mercier, Latin Joannes Mercerus (Uzès ca. 1510 – 1570) was a French Hebraist.

Mercier was a pupil of the less known François Vatable, and succeeded Vatable as professor of Hebrew at the Collège Royal. His students included Philippe du Plessis-Mornay, Zacharius Ursinus, Andrew Melville, and Pierre Martinius who became professor at La Rochelle. Mercier served as Lecteur du Roi from 1546 onwards.

Mercier fled to Venice because of his sympathies with Protestantism, but returned to France in 1570 following the conclusion of the third war of religion, only to succumb to the plague.

== Works ==
- Aramaic grammar Tabulae in grammaticen linguae Chaldaeae (Paris, 1560)
- De notis Hebraeorum liber (1582), revised by Jean Cinqarbres
- Commentary on Genesis (Geneva, posthumous 1598), published by Théodore de Bèze

Translations

- Bishop Jean du Tillet's Italian manuscript of the Hebrew Gospel of Matthew (Paris, 1555)
- Translation of Constantine Harmenopoulos Hexabiblos or Procheiron (Lyons, 1556, reprinted in 1580, 1587)
- Talmudic selections: Libellus de abbreviaturis Hebraeorum, tam Talmudicorum quam Masoritarum et aliorum rabbinorum (Paris, 1561)
- Hebrew Jonah with commentary of David Kimchi Jonas cum commentariis R. David Kimhi (1567)
- Translation of Abraham Ibn Ezra's Commentary on the Ten Commandments (Lyons, ca. 1567)
- Notes to Santes Pagnini's Oẓar Leshon ha-Kodesh (Lyons, 1575)
- Translation of Targum Jonathan on the Prophets
