= Dialogue of Jason and Papiscus =

Early Christian text

The Dialogue of Jason and Papiscus is a lost early Christian text in Greek describing the dialogue of a converted Jew, Jason, and an Alexandrian Jew, Papiscus. The text is first mentioned, critically, in the True Account of the anti-Christian writer Celsus (c. 178 AD), and therefore would have been contemporary with the surviving, and much more famous, dialogue between the convert from paganism Justin Martyr and Trypho the Jew.

== Sources ==
The main source is Origen in his Against Celsus where he criticises Celsus' selective use of the text.

he has chosen one that is worthless, which although it could be of some help to the simple-minded multitude in respect of their faith, certainly could not impress the more intelligent, saying: "I know a work of this sort a Controversy between one Papiscus and Jason..." ... Nevertheless, I could wish that everyone who hears Celsus' clever rhetoric asserting that the book entitled 'A Controversy between Jason and Papiscus about Christ' deserves not laughter but hatred, were to take the little book into his hands and have the patience and endurance to give attention to its contents. .... In it a Christian is described as disputing with a Jew from the Jewish scriptures and as showing that the prophecies about the Messiah fit Jesus; and the reply with which the other man opposes the argument is at least neither vulgar nor unsuitable to the character of a Jew. (Contra Celsum 4:52)

Origen's lukewarm defence of the text, his mention of the vigorous reply of Papiscus, and the Dialogue's use by Celsus, may explain the subsequent non-survival of the text. The loss of the document removes a potentially significant record of a 2nd-century Jewish Christian's arguments before later theological developments in the Christian church.

Jerome mentions the Dialogue twice. In Commentary on Galatians, in connection with he who is hanged on a tree is accursed of God (Commentary on Galatians, 2.3.13) and the Dialogue mis-citing Genesis 1:1 as "In the Son," (instead of "In the Beginning"), "God created the heaven and the earth." (Questions in Genesis, 2.507).

- "I Remember in the Dispute between Jason and Papiscus, which is composed in Greek, to have found it written: `The execration of God is he that is hanged.'" (Commentary on Galatians 3:13)
- "In the beginning God made the heaven and the earth. The majority believe, as it is affirmed also in the Dispute between Jason and Papiscus, and as Tertullian in his book Against Praxeas contends, and as Hilarius too, in his exposition of one of the Psalms, declares, that in the Hebrew it is: `In the Son, God made the heaven and the earth.' But that this is false, the nature of the case itself proves." (Questions in Genesis)

The third source is a letter (mistakenly included in the works of Cyprian) to a certain "Bishop Vigilius" (not Vigilius of Thapsus^{(de)}) describing a translation from Greek to Latin by an otherwise unknown Celsus, (given the sobriquet Celsus Africanus by scholars), which also describes the Dialogue, including the information that Jason himself was a convert from Judaism, and the ending - that Papiscus is convinced and asks for baptism.

A recent discovery in St. Catherine's monastery at Mount Sinai provides more text quoted from the Dialogue.

== Dating and authorship ==
Lahey (2007) dates the Dialogue to c. 140 and considers a date of c. 160 unlikely since the Dialogue is believed to be a source or model for the Dialogue with Trypho, which is itself dated c. 160.

Maximus the Confessor (7th century, or possibly 6th century if mainly the work of John of Scythopolis as suggested by Hans Urs von Balthasar), notes that Clement of Alexandria, in the (now lost) sixth book of his Hypotyposes ascribes the Dialogue to Luke the Evangelist, though Maximus himself ascribes the authorship to Aristo Pellaeus, an Eastern apologist and chronicler whom Eusebius mentions in connection with emperor Hadrian and Simon bar Kokhba. Although some doubt the testimony of Maximus, citing the absence of multiple attestation, many scholarly examinations of the dialogue readily accept Aristonian authorship.

F. C. Conybeare proposed the hypothesis (1898) that two later traditions, the Dialogue of Athanasius and Zacchaeus (Greek, 4th century) and the Dialogue of Timothy and Aquila (Greek, 6th century), were based on an earlier text, and identified that text as the Dialogue of Jason and Papiscus. His thesis was not widely accepted.
