= Sefer Joseph Hamekane =

13th-century Jewish apologetic text

Sefer Joseph Hamekane, or the Book of Joseph the Official, written by Joseph ben Nathan Official, is a 13th-century Jewish apologetic text. The title is also sometimes translated Book of Joseph the Zealot. The book is the third oldest of a series of treatises containing selected rabbinical translations of Matthew, following the Book of Nestor (c. 900) and the Milhamot HaShem (1170), and leading to later works including Ibn Shaprut's Touchstone, Jean du Tillet's Hebrew Matthew, and Rahabi Ezekiel's Hebrew Matthew of the 1750s.

== Editions and translations ==
- Judah Rosenthal (Jerusalem, 1970) (Hebrew edition).
- Benotti, Luca, "A Critical Edition of Sefer Yosef ha-Meqanne, with an Introduction, a Translation and a Commentary' (unpublished PhD thesis, Università Ca' Foscari Venezia, 2016)
