= Dialogue of Timothy and Aquila =

Greek Christian text

The Dialogue of Timothy and Aquila is a Greek Christian text giving a dialogue, akin to that of Dialogue with Trypho, between Timothy, a Christian, and Aquila, a Jew. The text was earlier thought to date to 200 CE, however recent studies assign a later date, as late as the 6th century.

F. C. Conybeare proposed the hypothesis (1898) that two later traditions, the Dialogue of Athanasius and Zacchaeus (Greek, 4th century) and the Dialogue of Timothy and Aquila (Greek, 6th century), were based on an earlier text, and identified that text as related to the lost Dialogue of Jason and Papiscus. His thesis was not widely accepted.
