= Dialogue of Athanasius and Zacchaeus =

4th-century Greek Christian text

The Dialogue of Athanasius and Zacchaeus is a 4th-century Greek Christian text giving a dialogue, akin to that of Dialogue with Trypho, between Athanasius, a Christian, and Zacchaeus, a Jew. Patrick Andrist and other scholars consider the work, however much it may have a base in real encounters, primarily a missionary catechism.

F. C. Conybeare proposed the hypothesis (1898) that two later traditions, the Dialogue of Athanasius and Zacchaeus (Greek, 4th century) and the Dialogue of Timothy and Aquila (Greek, 6th century), were based on an earlier text, and identified that text as related to the lost Dialogue of Jason and Papiscus. His thesis was not widely accepted.
