= Christian polemics and apologetics in the Middle Ages =

Christian polemics and apologetics in Europe during the Middle Ages were primarily directed inwards, either against "heretics," such as the Cathars, or between Roman Catholic and Eastern Orthodox. A subset of polemic and apologetic activity continued against Judaism and Islam, both openly in Christian Europe and more circumspectly in the pre-Ottoman and Ottoman lands.

== Polemics against heretics ==
Given the absolute control of the state, and the lack of ethnic separation (such as protected to a degree and at some times Jewish communities in Christian Europe) military and police actions were generally used against Christian heretics, rather than polemics and apologetics. For example, the Cathars did not survive Albigensian Crusade (1209-1229) and massacre at Montségur (1244) to leave traces of Cathar apologetics.

== Polemics against Islam ==
The Crusades also formed the background to medieval Christian criticism of Islam and medieval Islamic criticism of Christianity, resulting in conflicting responses from Christian authors of chivalrous epics and hostile theological polemics. Peter the Venerable's commission of a Latin translation of the Qur'an, was followed by polemical writings from Pedro Pascual, Riccoldo da Monte di Croce Contra legem Sarracenorum "Against the Quran of the Saracens" (1300), and Ramon Llull.

== Polemics against Judaism ==
Virulent antisemitism in medieval Europe obviated the need for any debate or discussion in most periods and most countries. However, during the 12th Century converted Jews such as Petrus Alfonsi and Pablo Christiani, well versed in Jewish religion, initiated the Contra Iudaeos (or Adversus Iudaeos) literature either from missionary or polemic reasons. This was both an impetus to and response to Jewish apologetics answering Christians, and more robust polemical writings (where safe to publish) among the community as a guard against conversion.
