= Jean Cinqarbres =

French grammarian

Jean Cinqarbres (Latin name Quinquarboreus) (c.1520s in Aurillac – June 1565) was a French grammarian of Hebrew. With his colleague Jean Mercier (Hebraist) (Mercerus) he shared the role of conjunct royal professor of Hebrew and Syriac.

== Publications ==
- 1546: De Re grammatica Hebraeorum opus
- 1549: Targum, seu Paraphrasis Caldaica in Lamentationes Jeremiae prophetae
- 1551: Sanctum Domini Nostri Jesu Christi hebraicum Evangelium secundum Matthaeum
- 1559: Institutiones in linguam hebraïcam, sive Epitome operis de re grammatica Hebraeorum
- 1559: Tabula in grammaticen hebraeam, authore Nicolao Clenardo, a Johanne Quinquarboreo repurgata et annotationibus illustrata
- 1570: Avicennae. Libri tertii fen secunda, quae latine ex synonymo hebraïco Ophan reddi potest : intuitus, sive rotundus sermo secundus, qui est de aegritudinibus nervorum, tractatu uno contentus, ad fidem codicis hebraïci latinus factus
