= Domenico Gerosolimitano =

Ecclesiastical censor of Hebrew books

Domenico Gerosolimitano (Hebrew: דומניקו ג'רוזלימיטנו; sometimes spelled Dominico Irosolimitano), originally Rabbi Samuel Vivas of Jerusalem, (fl. 1590s) was a notable ecclesiastical censor of Hebrew books. His Sefer Hazikkuk, the Hebrew equivalent of Index Expurgatorius, played an important role in the censorship of Hebrew books in the late 16th and early 17th centuries.

== Life ==
Gerosolimitano was born in Safed in Ottoman Palestine in about 1550, and died in Italy in about 1620. He was educated at the rabbinical college in his native city, studying not only Talmud, but also medicine. After having been granted the degree of doctor and the title of "Rav", he lectured on Talmudic law in Safed. His fame as a physician spread far and wide, and finally reached the ears of the Sultan Murad III, who summoned him to Constantinople as court physician.

Yerushalmi subsequently became a convert to Christianity; he went to Rome, and was received at the College of the Neophytes, where he taught Hebrew. During the most active period of the expurgation of Hebrew books under the Inquisition in Italy Dominico's services were in great demand; and first in Venice (1578-92?), later as chief reviser of the censorship commission in Mantua (1595–97), he had opportunity for placing his signature in more books and manuscripts than any other of the Italian expurgators. His activity in this direction continued at intervals—in places, however, not yet identified—almost until his death.

Dominico's works included, according to his own statement, Ma'ayan Gannim ("Fountain of the Gardens"), on the fundamental principles of the Christian faith, lost already a few years after Domenico's death and ever since. He also translated into Hebrew the whole of the New Testament, and most of the Apocryphal books (1615–17). These Manuscripts are in the Vatican Library. He was the compiler of the Sefer ha-Ziḳḳuḳ ("Book of Expurgation"), still in manuscript, one copy of which (in the library of Cardinal Berberini, now part of the Vatican Library in Rome) shows revision by him as late as 1619.

The record of Dominico's conversion has been discovered, dated 6 August 1593 in Venice. The seventeenth century authors Giulio Bartolocci and Johann Christoph Wolf state that Nicolaus Mursius in his Relatione della Città di Constantinopoli (Bologna, 1671) mentions as court physician of the Turkish sultan a Jew who later became converted under the name of "Dominico Ierosolymitano". Wolf holds that he is identical with the subject of this article; Bartolocci, on the other hand, states that Mursius speaks of one whom he (Mursius) had himself seen in his travels, and who was still living as a Christian in Constantinople in direst poverty, though as a Jew he had held, under the name of Pelaso, third place among the sultan's physicians. Mursius however did not write this book about Constantinopel, he plagiarized it, as Domenico Gerosolimitano wrote it. Mursius' information might therefore not be reliable.

=== Jewish Encyclopedia Bibliography ===
- Bartolocci, Giulio. Bibliotheca Rabbinae. ii. 282, 283
- Wolf, Johann Christoph. Bibliotheca Hebraea. i. 331, iii. 210
- Popper (1899), The Censorship of Hebrew Books, New York, s.v.
- Berliner, A(Abrham). (1891), Censur Und Confiscation Hebräischer Bücher Im Kirchenstaate: Auf Grund Der Inquisitions-Akten in Der Vaticana Und Vallicellana, pp. 9 et seq., Frankfort-on-the-Main, Web access
- Mortara, Moritz, in Steinschneider. Hebr. Bibl. v. 96 et seq.;
- Stern, Moritz (1893), Urkundliche Beiträge über die Stellung der Päpste zu den Juden, No. 158, Kiel.
