= Abner of Burgos =

14th-century Castilian philosopher and religious writer

Abner of Burgos (c. 1270 – c. 1347, or a little later) was a Jewish philosopher, a convert to Christianity, and a polemical writer against his former religion. Known after his conversion as Alfonso of Valladolid or "Master Alfonso."

== Life ==
As a student he acquired a certain mastery in Biblical and Talmudical studies, to which he added an intimate acquaintance with Peripatetic philosophy and astrology. What we know of his biography comes primarily from his own comments in his Moreh Zedek/Mostrador de justicia. According to that work, he stated that his religious doubts arose in 1295 when he treated a number of Jews for distress following their involvement in the failed messianic movement in Avila. As Abner tells it, he "had a dream" in which a similar experience of crosses mysteriously appearing on his garments drove him to question his ancestral faith.

== Works ==
The following is a list of Abner's writings:

1. The Moreh Zedek (Teacher of Righteousness), surviving only as the Mostrador de justicia (Paris BN MS Esp. 43, consisting of a dialogue containing ten chapters of discussions between a religious teacher (Abner?) and a Jewish controversialist.
2. Teshuvot la-Meharef (Response to the Blasphemer), also in Castilian translation, Respuestas al blasfemo (Rome. Biblioteca Apostolica Vaticana MS 6423)
3. Polemical letters and the Teshuvot ha-Meshubot responding to responses to his letters.
4. The Libro de la ley
5. The determinist philosophical work Minhat Qenaot (Offering of Zeal), surviving only in Castilian translation as Ofrenda de Zelos or Libro del Zelo de Dios (Rome. Biblioteca Apostolica Vaticana MS 6423)
6. A mathematical treatise Meyyasher Aqob or Meyaššer 'Aqov (Straightening the Curve) (attributed)

Some of his lost works may include:

1. A commentary on Ibn Ezra's commentary on the Decalogue, written before his apostasy.
2. Sefer Milhamot Adonai ("Wars of the Lord"). This was translated into Castilian, at the request of the Infanta Doña Blanca, prioress of a convent in Burgos, under the title "Las Batallas de Dios."
3. La Concordia de las Leyes, an attempt to provide Old Testament foundations for Christian dogmas. According to Reinhardt and Santiago (p. 86, n. 10.4) this text is found in Paris BN MS Esp. 43.
4. Iggeret ha-Gezerah (Epistle on Fate).

Some of the works falsely attributed to him include:

1. Libro de las tres gracias, Madrid Biblioteca Nacional MS 9302 (Kayserling). The title is a misreading of Libro de las tres creencias. According to Reinhardt and Santiago (pp. 86–88, n. 10.5) the text is also found in Escorial MSS h.III.3 and P.III.21, where it is called the Libro declarante.
2. Libro de las hadas (also attributed to the Pseudo-San Pedro Pascual). According to Reinhardt and Santiago (p. 88, n. 10.6) this text is also found in Escorial MSS h.III.3 and P.III.21
3. Sermones a los moros y judios. Found as anonymous in Soria: Casa de la Cultura, MS 25-H (Reinhardt and Santiago, p. 314, n. 143.6)
4. The Epistola Rabbi Samualis and Disputatio Abutalib of Alfonsus Bonihiminis.

== See also ==
- Criticism of Judaism
- Petrus Alfonsi
