= Jacob ibn Zur =

Moroccan rabbi, poet and scholar

Personal life
- Born: Jacob ben Reuben ibn Ẓur; 1673 Fez, Morocco
- Died: 1753 (aged 79–80) Fez, Morocco
- Buried: Fez Jewish Cemetery
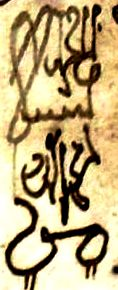
- Signature

Religious life
- Religion: Judaism

Jacob ben Reuben ibn Ẓur or Jacob Abensur (1673–1753) was a poet, scholar and leading Moroccan rabbi.

== Biography ==
Jacob was born in 1673 in Fez. He studied under the rabbis Vidal Serfaty and Menahem Serero. In 1693, he was appointed as registrar at the bet din (rabbinical court) of Fez, and then as a rabbi and head of the bet din in 1704, a post which he held for another thirty years. Thereafter, oppressive taxation induced him to move to Meknès, where he became a member of the bet din for eleven years, and after that he moved to Tétouan to serve in its bet din for another seven years.

In his old age, Ibn Zur ordained five of his students: Samuel b. R. Jacob b. Danan, R. Ephraim b. Abraham Monsonyego, his son R. Raphael Obed Ibn Zur, R. Elijah b. A. Joseph HaSarfati, and his grandson R. Matitya b. R. R. Jacob b. Menahem II Serero; who later became known as the “Court of Five” (bet din shel ḥamishah).

== Works ==
- Mishpat u-Ẓedekah be-Ya’akov, a published collection of some of his responsa. He was consulted on halakhic questions. Many of Jacob's responsa are preserved in the works of Moroccan rabbis.
- Et le-khol Ḥefeẓ, a published collection of liturgical poetry
- Et Sofer, this work is still in manuscript, specimens of contracts, documents and form letters. The kabbalist and rabbi Abraham Ankawa published most of this work his Kerem Ḥemed

== Bibliography ==
=== Sources ===
- Aranov, Saul I. (1979). A Descriptive Catalogue of the Bension Collection of Sephardic Manuscripts and Texts. University of Alberta. ISBN 978-0-88864-016-1.
- Schirmann, Hayyim (2007). "IBN ẒUR, JACOB BEN REUBEN". In Skolnik, Fred; Berenbaum, Michael (eds.). Encyclopaedia Judaica. Vol. 9 (2nd ed.). ISBN 978-0-02-865937-4.
- Zafrani, Haim (2007). "ABENSUR, JACOB". In Skolnik, Fred; Berenbaum, Michael (eds.). Encyclopaedia Judaica. Vol. 1 (2nd ed.). ISBN 978-0-02-865929-9.
