= Sefer Nizzahon Yashan =

13th-century Jewish apologetic text

Sefer Nizzahon (Yashan) (Hebrew: ספר ניצחון, romanized: sēfer niṣṣāḥon, lit. 'Book of Victory') "The (Old) Book of Victory" is an anonymous Jewish apologetic text that originated in 13th-century Germany. The word "old" (yashan) has become attached to the title to distinguish the work from the Sefer Nizzahon of Yom-Tov Lipmann-Muhlhausen of Prague, written in the 15th century. A modern edition was published by Mordechai Breuer in 1978, and a critical edition by David Berger in 2008.

The work was known and responded to by Protestant Hebraists and polemicists, including Johann Reuchlin, Sebastian Münster, Wolfgang Capito, Immanuel Tremellius, John Calvin, and Martin Luther.

== See also ==
- Jewish views on Jesus
- Dialogue with Trypho
