= Jacob ben Reuben (rabbi) =

Spanish rabbi and polemicist

Jacob ben Reuben was a Spanish rabbi and polemicist of the twelfth century. In response to attacks by the convert Petrus Alphonsi, he wrote the Sefer Milhamot Adonai or Milhamoth ha-Shem ("Book of the Wars of the Lord"). This work was divided into twelve chapters, and contained, besides refutations of the Christian arguments drawn from the Tanakh, a thorough criticism of the Gospels and the Acts of the Apostles, in which he points out many apparent contradictions.

It was one of the earliest Jewish polemical works of medieval Europe.
