= Frederick Cornwallis Conybeare =

British orientalist (1856–1924)

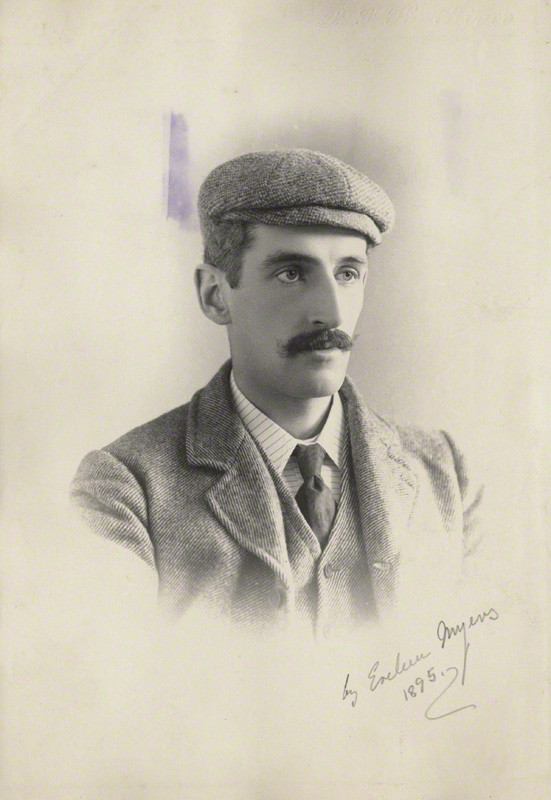
- Born: 14 September 1856; Coulsdon, Surrey
- Died: 9 January 1924 (aged 67)
- Occupations: Orientalist, theologian, writer, translator

Frederick Cornwallis Conybeare, FBA (14 September 1856 – 9 January 1924) was a British orientalist, Fellow of University College, Oxford, and Professor of Theology at the University of Oxford.

== Biography ==
Conybeare was born in Coulsdon, Surrey, the third son of a barrister, John Charles Conybeare, and grandson of the geologist William Daniel Conybeare. He took an interest in the Order of Corporate Reunion, becoming a bishop in it in 1894. Also in the 1890s he wrote a book on the Dreyfus case, as a Dreyfusard, and translated the Testament of Solomon and other early Christian texts. As well, he did influential work on Barlaam and Josaphat. He was an authority on the Armenian Church and on Armenian history more generally, making him one of the more prominent figures in the field of Armenian Studies in Europe at the turn of the twentieth century.

From 1904 to 1915 he was a member of the Rationalist Press Association, founded in 1899.

One of his best-known works is Myth, Magic, and Morals from 1909, later reissued under the title The Origins of Christianity. This has been read both as a strong criticism of the Jesus myth theory, making Conybeare a supporter of the historical Jesus; but also as an attack on aspects of orthodox Christianity itself. He returned later in 1914 to make a direct assault on leading proponents of the time of the Jesus-myth theory.

Coneybeare also worked as a translator and translated two volumes of Philostratus' The Life of Apollonius of Tyana for the Loeb Classical Library. He also translated The Testament of Solomon.

He died in 1924 aged 68 and is buried in Brompton Cemetery, London.

His wife Mary Emily was a translator of Wilhelm Scherer.

== See also ==
- Paulicianism
- Apology of Aristides

== Works ==
=== Books ===
- Outlines of a Philosophy of Religion by Hermann Lotze (1892) translator
- The Armenian Apology and Acts of Apollonius, and Other Monuments of Early Christianity (1896)
- The Demonology of the New Testament. I (1896)
- About the Contemplative Life; or the Fourth Book of the Treatise Concerning Virtues, by Philo Judaeus (1895) editor
- The Key of Truth, a Manual of the Paulician Church of Armenia (1898)
- The Story of Ahikar from the Syriac, Arabic, Armenian, Ethiopic, Greek and Slavonic Versions (1898) with J. Rendel Harris and Agnes Smith Lewis
- The Dreyfus Case (1899)
- Rituale Armenorum Being the Administration of the Sacraments & the Breviary Rites of the Armenian Church Together with the Greek Rites of Baptism & Epiphany edited from the oldest manuscripts (1905) with Arthur John Maclean
- Selections from the Septuagint According to the Text of Swete (1905) with St. George Stock, later as A Grammar of Septuagint Greek online
- The Armenian version of Revelation, Apocalypse of John the Divine (1907) editor
- Myth, Magic, and Morals: A Study of Christian Origins (1909)
- History of New Testament Criticism (1910)
- The Ring of Pope Xystus, Together with the Prologue of Rufinus (1910)
- The Life of Apollonius of Tyana: The Epistles of Apollonius and the Treatise of Eusebius. Philostratus (1912) translator, Loeb Classical Library, two volumes
- A Catalogue of the Armenian Manuscripts in the British Museum (1913)
- The Historical Christ; or, An investigation of the views of Mr. J. M. Robertson, Dr. A. Drews, and Prof. W. B. Smith (1914)
- Russian Dissenters (1921)
- The Armenian Church: Heritage and Identity. (St. Vartan Press: New York, 2001) edited by the Rev. Nerses Vrej Nersessian

=== Articles ===
- "The Testament of Solomon" (translation), Jewish Quarterly Review (October 1898)
- "The History of Christmas", The American Journal of Theology 3 (1899), 1–22
- "Antiochus Strategos, The Capture of Jerusalem by the Persians in 614 AD " (translation), English Historical Review 25 (1910), 502–517
- "The Philosophical Aspects of the Doctrine of Divine Incarnation" Jewish Quarterly Review (July 1895)
- "The Demonology of the New Testament. I" Jewish Quarterly Review July 1896
- "Christian Demonology. II" Jewish Quarterly Review October 1896
- "Christian Demonology. III" Jewish Quarterly Review April 1897
- The Eusebian Form of the Text of Matthew 28:19 Zeitschrift für die neutestamentliche Wissenschaft (a journal) 2 (1901): 275–88
- "The Survival of Animal Sacrifices inside the Christian Church" The American Journal of Theology January 1903
- "The History of the Greek Church" The American Journal of Theology July 1903
