= Polemic =

Contentious rhetoric

Polemic (/pəˈlɛmɪk/ pə-LEHM-ick, US also /-ˈlimɪk/ -LEEM-ick) is contentious rhetoric intended to support a specific position by forthright claims and to undermine the opposing position. The practice of such argumentation is called polemics, which are seen in arguments on controversial topics. A person who writes polemics, or speaks polemically, is called a polemicist. The word derives from Ancient Greek πολεμικός (polemikos) 'warlike, hostile', from πόλεμος (polemos) 'war'.

Polemics often concern questions in religion or politics. A polemical style of writing was common in Ancient Greece, as in the writings of the historian Polybius. Polemics again became common in medieval and early modern times. Since then, famous polemicists have included satirist Jonathan Swift, Italian physicist and mathematician Galileo, French theologian Jean Calvin, French Enlightenment writer, historian, and philosopher Voltaire, Russian author Leo Tolstoy, socialist philosophers Karl Marx and Friedrich Engels, novelist George Orwell, playwright George Bernard Shaw, communist revolutionary Vladimir Lenin, linguist Noam Chomsky, social critics H. L. Mencken, Christopher Hitchens and Peter Hitchens, feminists such as Andrea Dworkin and existential philosophers Søren Kierkegaard and Friedrich Nietzsche.

Polemical journalism was common in continental Europe when libel laws were not as stringent as they are now. To support study of 17th to 19th century controversies, a British research project has placed online thousands of polemical pamphlets from that period. Discussions of atheism, humanism, and Christianity have remained open to polemic into the 21st century.

== History ==
In Ancient Greece, writing was characterised by what Geoffrey Lloyd and Nathan Sivin called "strident adversariality" and "rationalistic aggressiveness", summed up by McClinton as polemic. For example, the ancient historian Polybius practiced "quite bitter self-righteous polemic" against some twenty philosophers, orators, and historians.

Polemical writings were common in medieval and early modern times. During the Middle Ages, polemic had a religious dimension, as in Jewish texts written to protect and dissuade Jewish communities from converting to other religions. Medieval Christian writings were also often polemical; for example in their disagreements on Islam or in the vast corpus aimed at converting the Jews. Martin Luther's 95 Theses was a polemic launched against the Catholic Church. (Note: The story of Luther nailing his Theses to the church door has been doubted. See references in Martin Luther#Start of the Reformation – "the story of the posting on the door ... has little foundation in truth.") Robert Carliell's 1619 defence of the new Church of England and diatribe against the Roman Catholic Church – Britaine's glorie, or An allegoricall dreame with the exposition thereof: containing The Heathens infidelitie in religion ... – took the form of a 250-line poem.

Major political polemicists of the 18th century include Jonathan Swift, with pamphlets such as his A Modest Proposal, Alexander Hamilton, with pieces such as A Full Vindication of the Measures of Congress and A Farmer Refuted, and Edmund Burke, with his attack on the Duke of Bedford.

In the 19th century, Karl Marx and Friedrich Engels's 1848 Communist Manifesto was extremely polemical. Both Marx and Engels would publish further polemical works, with Engels's work Anti-Dühring serving as a polemic against Eugen Dühring, and Marx's Critique of the Gotha Programme against Ferdinand Lasalle. Vladimir Lenin published polemics against political opponents. The Proletarian Revolution and the Renegade Kautsky was notably directed against Karl Kautsky, and other works such as The State and Revolution attacked figures including Eduard Bernstein.

In the 20th century, George Orwell's Animal Farm was a polemic against totalitarianism, in particular of Stalinism in the Soviet Union. According to McClinton, other prominent polemicists of the same century include such diverse figures as Herbert Marcuse, Noam Chomsky, John Pilger, and Michael Moore. Conservative Jewish Austrian writer and journalist Karl Kraus (1890–1935) considers the topic of moral collapse in his polemic writings. Karl Kraus produced and published 922 issues of the fifteen-daily magazine called Die Fackel (The Torch) until his death. Ludwig Wittgenstein, Sigmund Freud, Ernst Mach write in a similar manner and style to Kraus.

In 2007 Brian McClinton argued in Humani that anti-religious books such as Richard Dawkins's The God Delusion are part of the polemic tradition. In 2008 the humanist philosopher A. C. Grayling published a book, Against All Gods: Six Polemics on Religion and an Essay on Kindness.

== See also ==
- Critic
- Devil's advocate
- Dialectic
- Disputation
- Internet troll
- Irenicism
- Philippic
- Rhetoric
- Social gadfly
- Trash talk

== Bibliography ==
- Gallop, Jane (2004). Polemic: Critical or Uncritical (1 ed.). New York: Routledge. ISBN 0-415-97228-0.
- Hawthorn, Jeremy (1987). Propaganda, Persuasion and Polemic. Hodder Arnold. ISBN 0-7131-6497-2.
- Lander, Jesse M. (2006). Inventing Polemic: Religion, Print, and Literary Culture in Early Modern England. Cambridge University Press. ISBN 0-521-83854-1.
- Öztürk, Nurettin (2005). Türk Edebiyatında Polemik ve "Kavgalarım". Lisans yayıncılık. ISBN 975-6597-28-5.
