= Ibn Shaprut =

Spanish Jewish philosopher, physician, and polemicist

- Born: 14th century Tudela
- Occupation: Translator, theologian, medical doctor

Shem-Tob ben Isaac Shaprut of Tudela (Hebrew: שם טוב אבן שפרוט) (born at Tudela, Kingdom of Navarre in the middle of the 14th century) was a Spanish Jewish philosopher, physician, and polemicist. He is often confused with the physician Shem-Tob ben Isaac of Tortosa, who lived earlier. He may also be confused with another Ibn Shaprut, Hasdai ibn Shaprut, who corresponded with the king of the Khazars in the 900s.

== Life ==
While still a young man he was compelled to debate in public, on original sin and redemption, with Cardinal Pedro de Luna (later Antipope Benedict XIII). The disputation took place in Pamplona on December 26, 1375, in the presence of bishops and theologians (see his Eben Boḥan; an extract, entitled "Wikkuaḥ" and in manuscript form, is in the Bibliothèque Nationale, Paris, No. 831).

A devastating war raged in Navarre against the Kingdom of Castile under Alfonso VIII and their allies, the Kingdom of England, which obliged ibn Shaprut, with many others, to leave the country. He settled at Tarazona in the Kingdom of Aragon, where he practised his profession as a physician among both Jews and Christians. As a Talmudic scholar, he corresponded with Sheshet, a rabbi of the Talmudic academies in Babylonia.

== Works and editions ==
=== The Touchstone ===
At Tarazona he completed his Eben Boḥan (May, 1380 or 1385), a polemical work against baptized Jews. As a model and guide for this work, which consists of fourteen chapters, or "gates," and is written in the form of a dialogue, he took the polemical Sefer Milḥamot Adonai of Jacob ben Reuben, falsely attributed to David Ḳimḥi. Ibn Shaprut's work, however, is not a partial reproduction of the Milḥamot, as has been incorrectly stated ("Oẓar Neḥmad," ii. 32); it is rather an extension or continuation of it, since it goes into details which are either not mentioned, or are mentioned only briefly, in the other. In the fifteenth chapter, which Ibn Shaprut added later, he criticizes a work written by Alfonso de Valladolid against Jacob ben Reuben. The thirteenth chapter contains a very interesting fragment by a 14th-century Schopenhauer, who wrote under the pseudonym "Lamas" ("Samael"). The Eben Boḥan has been preserved in several manuscripts.

As part of The Touchstone in order to assist the Jews in defense against conversion and polemical writings, Ibn Shaprut edited or translated portions of the Four Gospels into Hebrew, accompanying them with pointed observations; answers to the latter, written by a neophyte named Jona, also exist in manuscript.

=== En Kol ===
Ibn Shaprut wrote a commentary to the first book of Avicenna's canon entitled "En Kol," on music for which he probably made use of the Hebrew translation of Sulaiman ibn Yaish and that of Joseph ben Joshua ibn Vives al-Lorqui, which later he criticizes severely.

=== The Exposer of Mysteries ===
He also wrote a super commentary, entitled "Ẓafnat Pa'aneaḥ," to Ibn Ezra's commentary on the Pentateuch (see M. Friedländer in the "Publications of the Society of Hebrew Literature," series ii., vol. iv., p. 221, where " Shem-Ṭob ben Joseph Shaprut of Toledo" should read "Shem-Ṭob ben Isaac of Tudela").

=== The Orchard of Pomegranates ===
One work of Ibn Shaprut has been printed: "Pardes Rimmonim," ( פרדס רימונים ) The Orchard of Pomegranates explanations of difficult Talmudic aggadot (Sabbionetta, 1554)

=== "Shem Tob's Hebrew Gospel of Matthew" ===
Shem-Tob's commentary on Matthew is not a separate translation, and almost certainly not actually by ibn Shaprut himself, but a complete commentary in Hebrew on the Gospel of Matthew found in the Eben Boḥan. On the basis that it probably constitutes an earlier independent text, it has been excised and edited as a separate edition by George Howard (2nd Ed. 1995), Hebrew Gospel of Matthew.

In 1879 the German orientalist Adolf Herbst published two other Jewish Hebrew translations of Matthew, also used by Italian and Spanish Jews to combat attempts to conversion, as Des Schemtob ben Schaphrut hebraeische Übersetzung des Evangeliums Matthaei nach den Drucken des S. Münster und J. du Tillet-Mercier neu herausgegeben (Göttingen, 1879). However these two manuscripts have no direct connection to Ibn Shaprut. They are a Spanish manuscript published and heavily edited by the cartographer Sebastian Münster (and now lost) and a related (surviving) Italian Jewish manuscript purchased by Bishop Jean du Tillet and published by the Hebraist Jean Mercier (1555).

== Bibliography ==
- José-Vicente Niclós: Šem t.ob ibn Šaprut. «La piedra de toque» (Eben Bohan). Una obra de controversia judeo-cristiana. Introducción, edición crítica, traducción y notas al libro I. Bibliotheca Hispana Bíblica 16. Madrid 1997.
