= Milhamoth ha-Shem =

Milhamoth ha-Shem (Hebrew: מלחמות השם) or Milhamoth Adonai (Wars of the Lord) is the title of several Hebrew polemical texts. The phrase is taken from the Book of the Wars of the Lord referenced in Numbers 21:14–15.

== Milhamoth ha-Shem of Salmon ben Jeroham, 10th century ==
Salmon ben Jeroham's The Book of the Wars of the Lord is a Karaite refutation of Saadia Gaon from the late 10th century.

== Milhamoth ha-Shem of Jacob ben Reuben, 12th century ==
The Milhamoth ha-Shem of Jacob ben Reuben, is a 12th-century Jewish apologia against conversion by Christians, consisting of questions and answers from selected texts of Gospel of Matthew, including Matt. 1:1–16, 3:13–17, 4:1–11, 5:33–40, 11:25–27, 12:1–8, 26:36–39, 28:16–20. It served as a precedent for the full Hebrew translation and interspersed commentary on Matthew found in Ibn Shaprut's Touchstone c. 1385.

== Milhamoth ha-Shem of Abraham, son of Maimonides, 13th century ==
Abraham Maimonides's Wars of the Lord is a treatise defending his father Maimonides against slander.

== Milhamoth ha-Shem of Nachmanides, 13th century ==
Nachmanides's Wars of the Lord is a Halakhic treatise attacking Zerahiah ha-Levi's commentary on Alfasi. The treatise goes in great detail on the piece of Talmud at hand.

== Milhamoth ha-Shem of Levi ben Gershom, 14th century ==
The Wars of the Lord of Gersonides (1288–1344) is a religious, astronomical and philosophical treatise.

== Milhamoth ha-Shem of Abner of Burgos (Alfonso of Valladolid), 14th century. ==
Abner of Burgos (ca1260-ca1347) was a convert to Christianity who wrote polemical works in Hebrew between 1320 and 1340. This text is Hebrew anti-Jewish polemic that is now lost but quotations of it survive in the Latin writing of the fifteenth-century convert Paul of Burgos (Scrutinium Scripturarum) and the polemicist Alonso de Espina (Fortalitium fidei). It served as a template for Abner's later work ʾMoreh Zedek, which now survives in a Castilian translation as Mostrador de justicia and much material from the Sefer is repeated there. Abner translated the work into Castilian himself at the behest of Blanca, Lady of Las Huelgas in Burgos around the year 1320, and a copy of this translation was seen by traveller Ambrosio de Morales in Valladolid in the 16th century.

== Milhamoth ha-Shem of Yiḥyeh Qafeḥ, 1931 ==
The seminal work composed by Yiḥyeh Qafeḥ (Hebrew: רבי יחיא בן שלמה קאפח), Chief Rabbi of Sana'a, Yemen and protagonist of the Dor Deah movement in Orthodox Judaism. Qafeḥ's Milḥamot HaShem (1931), which he began to write in 1914, argues that the Zohar is not authentic.
