= Jesus in the Talmud =

There are several passages in the Talmud which are believed by some scholars to be references to Jesus. The name used in the Talmud is "Yeshu" (ישו), the Aramaic vocalization (although not spelling) of the Hebrew name Yeshua. Many such passages have been deemed blasphemous by historical Christian authorities, including the Catholic Church.

Most Talmudic stories featuring an individual named "Yeshu" are framed in time periods which do not synchronize with one another, nor do they align with the scholarly consensus of Jesus' lifetime, with chronological discrepancies sometimes amounting to as much as a century before or after the accepted dates of Jesus' birth and death. This apparent multiplicity of "Yeshu"'s within the text has been used to defend the Talmud against Christian accusations of blaspheming Jesus since at least the 13th century.

In the modern era, there has been a variance of views among scholars on the possible references to Jesus in the Talmud, depending partly on presuppositions as to the extent to which the ancient rabbis were preoccupied with Jesus and Christianity. This range of views among modern scholars on the subject has been described as a range from "minimalists" who see few passages with reference to Jesus, to "maximalists" who see many passages having reference to Jesus. These terms "minimalist" and "maximalist" are not unique to discussion of the Talmud text; they are also used in discussion of academic debate on other aspects of Jewish vs. Christian and Christian vs. Jewish contact and polemic in the early centuries of Christianity, such as the Adversus Iudaeos genre. "Minimalists" include Jacob Zallel Lauterbach (1951) ("who recognize[d] only relatively few passages that actually have Jesus in mind"), while "maximalists" include R. Travers Herford (1903) (who concluded that most of the references related to Jesus, but were non-historical oral traditions which circulated among Jews), and Peter Schäfer (2007) (who concluded that the passages were parodies of parallel stories about Jesus in the New Testament incorporated into the Talmud in the 3rd and 4th centuries that illustrate the inter-sect rivalry between Judaism and nascent Christianity).

The first Christian censorship of the Talmud occurred in the year 521. More extensive censorship began during the Middle Ages, notably under the directive of Pope Gregory IX. Catholic authorities accused the Talmud of blasphemous references to Jesus and Mary. Jewish scholars refuted these claims, stating that there were no references to Jesus in the Talmud and that names like Joshua were common and unrelated to Jesus. These disputations led to the removal of many passages from subsequent editions of the Talmud.

Some editions of the Talmud, particularly those from the 13th century onward, are missing these references, removed either by Christian censors, by Jews themselves out of fear of reprisals, or possibly lost through negligence or accident. However, most editions of the Talmud published since the early 20th century have seen the restoration of most of these references.

== History ==
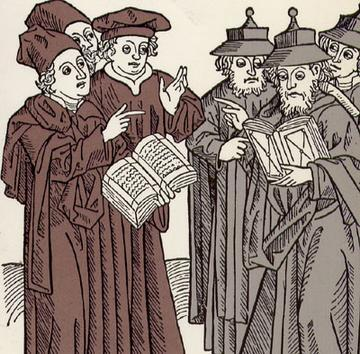
Woodcut carved by Johann von Armssheim (1483). Portrays a disputation between Christian and Jewish scholars

During the Middle Ages a series of debates on Judaism were staged by the Catholic Church—including the Disputation of Paris, the Disputation of Barcelona, and Disputation of Tortosa—and during those disputations, Jewish converts to Christianity, such as Pablo Christiani and Nicholas Donin claimed the Talmud contained insulting references to Jesus. An early work describing Jesus in the Talmud was Pugio Fidei ("Dagger of Faith") (c. 1280) by the Catalan Dominican Ramón Martí, a Jewish convert to Christianity. In 1681 Johann Christoph Wagenseil translated and published a collection of anti-Christian polemics from Jewish sources, with the title Tela Ignea Satanæ, sive Arcani et Horribiles Judæorum Adversus Christum, Deum, et Christianam Religionem Libri (Flaming Arrows of Satan, that is, the secret and horrible books of the Jews against Christ, God, and the Christian religion) which discussed Jesus in the Talmud. The first book devoted solely to the topic of Jesus in the Talmud was the Latin work Jesus in Talmude published in 1699 by Rudolf Martin Meelführer, a student of Wagenseil at Altdorf. In 1700, Johann Andreas Eisenmenger published Entdecktes Judenthum (Judaism Unmasked), which included descriptions of Jesus in the Talmud, and which would become the basis of much anti-Semitic literature in later centuries such as The Talmud Unmasked written in 1892 by Justinas Bonaventure Pranaitis.

Starting in the 20th century the topic of Jesus in Judaic literature became subject to more unbiased, scholarly research, such as Das Leben Jesu nach jüdischen Quellen (The Life of Jesus From Jewish Sources) written in 1902 by Samuel Krauss, which was the first scholarly analysis of the Judaic anti-Christian polemic Toledot Yeshu (The Biography of Jesus). In 1903, Unitarian scholar R. Travers Herford wrote Christianity in Talmud and Midrash, which became the standard work on the topic in the Christian world. He concluded that a large number of references referred to Jesus, not as a historical individual, but instead as the messiah of Christianity. In 1910, Hermann Strack wrote Jesus, die Häretiker und die Christen nach den ältesten jüdischen Angaben (Jesus, the heretics and the Christians according to the oldest Jewish data), which found no evidence of a historical Jesus in the Talmud. In 1922 Joseph Klausner wrote Yeshu ha-Notzri (Jesus of Nazareth) which concluded that "the evidence [for a historical Jesus] in the Talmud is scanty and does not contribute much to our knowledge of the historical Jesus; much of it is legendary and reflects the Jewish attempt to counter Christian claims and reproaches" but he did conclude some material was historically reliable. In 1950 Morris Goldstein wrote Jesus in the Jewish Tradition, including sections on the Toledoth Yeshu. In 1951, Jacob Z. Lauterbach wrote the essay Jesus in the Talmud. In 1978 Johann Maier wrote Jesus von Nazareth in der talmudischen Überlieferung (Jesus of Nazareth in the Talmudic tradition) in which he concludes that there is virtually no evidence of the historical Jesus in the Talmud and that the references to Jesus were "legendary" and probably added late in the Talmudic era "as a reaction to Christian provocations". In 2007, Peter Schäfer wrote Jesus in the Talmud in which he tried to find a middle ground between "anti-Jewish Christian" and "apologetic Jewish" interpretations. He concluded that the references to Jesus (as the messiah of Christianity) were included in the early (3rd and 4th century) versions of the Talmud and were parodies of New Testament narratives.

== In the context of Christian-Judaic polemics ==
In the first few centuries AD, there were many sects claiming to be Judaism (such as Pharisees, Essenes, and Sadducees), each claiming to be the correct faith. Some scholars treat Christianity, during that era, referred to as Early Christianity, as simply one of many sects of Judaism. Some sects wrote polemics advocating their position and occasionally disparaging rival sects. Some scholars view the depictions of Jesus in the Talmud as a manifestation of those inter-sect rivalries—thus, the depictions can be read as polemics by the rabbinic authors of the Talmud, which indirectly criticized the rival sect (Christianity), which was growing and becoming more dominant.

=== Relationship to New Testament ===
Peter Schäfer concluded that the references were not from the early tannaitic period (1st and 2nd centuries) but rather from the 3rd and 4th centuries, during the amoraic period. He asserts that the references in the Babylonian Talmud were "polemical counter-narratives that parody the New Testament stories, most notably the story of Jesus' birth and death" and that the rabbinical authors were familiar with the Gospels (particularly the Gospel of John) in their form as the Diatessaron and the Peshitta, the New Testament of the Syrian Church. Schäfer argues that the message conveyed in the Talmud was a "bold and self-confident" assertion of the correctness of Judaism, maintaining that "there is no reason to feel ashamed because we rightfully executed a blasphemer and idolater."

By way of comparison, the New Testament itself also documents conflict with Rabbinic Judaism, for example, in the John 8:41 charge, "We are not born of fornication." and "Are we not right in saying that you are a Samaritan and have a demon?" and in return in the description in Revelation of a "synagogue of Satan."

=== Early anti-Christian sentiments ===
In contrast to Peter Schäfer, Daniel J. Lasker suggests that the Talmudic stories about Jesus are not deliberate, provocative polemics but instead demonstrate "embryonic" Jewish objections to Christianity which would later "blossom into a full-scale Jewish polemical attack on Christianity [the Toledoth Yeshu]".

=== Ambivalent relationship ===
Jeffrey Rubenstein has argued that the accounts in Chullin and Avodah Zarah ("Idolatry") reveal an ambivalent relationship between rabbis and Christianity. In his view, the Tosefta account reveals that at least some Jews believed Christians were true healers, but that the rabbis saw this belief as a major threat. Concerning the Babylonian Talmud account in Avoda Zarah, Boyarin views Jacob of Sechania as a Christian preacher and understands Rabbi Eliezer's arrest for minuth ("heresy") as an arrest by the Romans for practising Christianity. When the Governor (the text uses the word for chief judge) interrogated him, the rabbi answered that he "trusted the judge." Boyarin has suggested that this was the Jewish version of the Br'er Rabbit approach to domination, which he contrasts to the strategy of many early Christians, who proclaim their beliefs despite the consequences (i.e., martyrdom). Although Rabbi Eliezer was referring to God, the Governor interpreted him as referring to the Governor himself and freed the rabbi. According to them, the account also reveals greater contact between Christians and Jews in the 2nd century than was commonly believed. They view the account of the teaching of Yeshu as an attempt to mock Christianity. According to Rubenstein, the structure of this teaching, in which a biblical prooftext is used to answer a question about biblical law, is familiar to both the rabbis and early Christians. The vulgar content, however, may have been used to parody Christian values. Boyarin considers the text to be an acknowledgment that rabbis often interacted with Christians, despite their doctrinal antipathy.

== Disputations and censorship ==
Between 1239 and 1775, the Catholic Church at various times either forced the censoring of parts of the Talmud that were theologically problematic or the destruction of copies of the Talmud.

During the Middle Ages a series of debates on Judaism were held by Catholic authorities – including the Disputation of Paris (1240), the Disputation of Barcelona (1263), and Disputation of Tortosa (1413–14) – and during those disputations, Jewish converts to Christianity, such as Nicholas Donin (in Paris) and Pablo Christiani (in Barcelona) claimed the Talmud contained insulting references to Jesus.

During these disputations, representatives from Jewish communities presented various defenses against the charges brought by Christian disputants. A significant influence on later Jewish responses was the defense put forth by Yechiel of Paris in 1240. He argued that a passage in the Talmud referring to an individual named Yeshu did not pertain to the Christian Jesus. However, Yechiel also acknowledged that another reference to Yeshu did refer to him. This formulation has been described as the "theory of two Jesuses," although Berger (1998) notes that Yechiel actually argues for three distinct Jesuses. This defence featured again in later Jewish defences during the medieval period, such as that of Nachmanides at the Disputation of Barcelona, though others such as Profiat Duran at the Disputation of Tortosa did not follow this argument.

Amy-Jill Levine notes that even today, some rabbinical experts do not consider that the Talmud's account of Jesus' death is a reference to the Jesus of the New Testament. Gustaf Dalman (1922), Joachim Jeremias (1960), Mark Allen Powell (1998) and Roger T. Beckwith (2005) were also favourable to the view the Yeshu references in the Talmud were not to Jesus. Richard Bauckham considers Yeshu a legitimate, if rare, form of the name in use at the time and writes that an ossuary bearing both the names Yeshu and Yeshua ben Yosef shows that it "was not invented by the rabbis as a way of avoiding pronouncing the real name of Jesus of Nazareth"

Numerous times between 1239 and 1775, copies of the Talmud were destroyed. In 1280, following the Disputation of Barcelona, the Talmud was censored. Following the invention of the printing press, the Talmud was banned by the Pope. All printed editions of the Talmud, including the Basel Talmud and the Vilna Edition Shas, were censored. In 1559, the Talmud was placed on the Roman Index and banned. In 1564, under the Tridentine Index, an expunged version of the Talmud was allowed. In 1592, the pope ordered all copies of the Talmud and other heretical writing destroyed, whether they were expunged or not. The total prohibition would stay in place until 1775. Even then, the censorship system would remain in force. As a result of these disputations, many manuscript editions had references to Jesus removed or changed, and subsequent manuscripts sometimes omitted the passages entirely. Few copies would survive.

In the 20th century, new editions began restoring the censored material, such as in the 1935 English Soncino edition.

=== Text-criticism, versions, and alterations ===
Starting in the 13th century, manuscripts of the Talmud were sometimes altered in response to the criticisms made during the disputations and in response to orders from the Christian church. Existing manuscripts were sometimes altered (for example, by erasure), and new manuscripts often omitted the passages entirely. Peter Schäfer compared several editions and documented some alterations as illustrated in the following table:

Edition / Manuscript	Passage on execution (Sanhedrin 43 a–b)	Passage on punishment in afterlife (b Gittin 57a)	Passage on disciples (Sanhedrin 43 a–b)
Herzog 1	on the eve of Passover they hanged Jesus the Nazarene		Jesus the Nazarene had five disciples
Vatican 130		he went and brought up Jesus the Nazarene	
Vatican 140		he went and brought up Jesus	
Munich 95	on the eve of Passover they hanged [name erased]	he went and brought up Jesus	[text erased]
Firenze II.1.8–9	on Sabbath even and the eve of Passover they hanged Jesus the Nazarene		Jesus the Nazarene had five disciples
Karlsruhe 2	on the eve of Passover they hanged Jesus the Nazarene		Jesus the Nazarene had five disciples
Barco	on the eve of Passover they hanged [not legible]		[not legible] had five disciples
Soncino	on the eve of Passover they hanged [not legible]	he went and brought up [name missing]	
Vilna	[whole passage deleted by censor]	he went and brought up the sinners of Israel	[whole passage deleted by censor]

== As evidence of the historical Jesus ==
Bart Ehrman, and separately Mark Allan Powell, state that the Talmud references are quite late in the 3rd-5th century CE hundreds of years later, and give no historically reliable information about the teachings or actions of Jesus during his life. Ehrman clarifies that the name "Son of Panthera" (Roman who allegedly was the seducer of Mary) was a tradition, as scholars have long recognized, that represented an attack on the Christian view that he was the son of a virgin. In Greek, the term for virgin is parthenos, which is similar to panthera, implying that "son of panthera" is a pun on "son of a virgin". However, Robert Travers Herford, a British Unitarian minister and scholar of rabbinical literature who translated the Gemara, when commenting on the above hypothesis, could not understand why the Rabbi authors of the Talmud would choose to describe Jesus as a son of a virgin by using a word that supposedly connects to a Greek word for virgin rather than simply use an Aramaic/Hebrew word:

“Again, Pandira may represent παρθενος [parthenos/virgin], and the obvious appropriateness of a name indicating the alleged birth of Jesus from a virgin might make us overlook the improbability that the form παρθενος [parthenos/virgin] should be Hebraized into the form Pandira, when the Greek word could have been reproduced almost unchanged in a Hebrew form. It is not clear, moreover, why a Greek word should have been chosen as an epithet for Jesus. I cannot satisfy myself that any of the suggested explanations solve the problem; and being unable to propose any other, I leave the two names Ben Stada and Ben Pandira as relics of ancient Jewish mockery against Jesus, the clue to whose meaning is now lost.”

The name "ben Stada", used for the same figure, is explained by Peter Schäfer as a reference to his mother's supposed adultery:

His mother's true name was Miriam, and "Stada" is an epithet which derives from the Hebrew/Aramaic root sat.ah/sete' ("to deviate from the right path, to go astray, to be unfaithful"). In other words, his mother Miriam was also called "Stada" because she was a sotah, a woman suspected, or rather convicted, of adultery."

Peter Schäfer states that there can be no doubt that the narrative of the execution of Jesus in the Talmud refers to Jesus of Nazareth, but states that the rabbinic material in question is from a later Amoraic period and may have drawn on the Christian gospels, and may have been written in response to them.

Scholars debate whether the Talmud provides any evidence of Jesus as a historical individual. Van Voorst (2000) describes this as a spectrum of opinion:

- On one side stand Johann Maier (1978) and those broadly sympathetic to his conclusions such as John P. Meier and Jacob Neusner. Maier discounts accounts with no mention of the name Jesus, and further discounts those that do mention Jesus by name, such as Sanh. 43a and 107b, as later medieval changes. Arguments against the current form of Talmudic references to Jesus being evidence of a historical individual include contextual evidence, such as chronological inconsistencies, for example the original contexts of accounts in the Tosefta and Talmud take place in different historical periods. Maier also views that the tradition first seen in the writings of Celsus can not be regarded as a reliable reference to the historical Jesus.
- On the other side stand scholars such as Joseph Klausner (1925), following R. Travers Herford (1901) and Bernhard Pick (1887), who believed that the Talmud gives some insight into Jesus as a historical individual. Some of these researchers contend that the Talmud's importance and credibility as an early source lies in the fact that it gives the "opposition view" to Jesus, and they have used the Talmud to draw the conclusions about the historical Jesus, such as:
  - Robert E. Van Voorst, Jesus Outside the New Testament: An Introduction to the Ancient Evidence, Wm. B. Eerdmans Publishing, 2000. pp 111–120
  - Norman Perrin, The New Testament, An Introduction: Proclamation and Parenesis, Myth and History, Harcourt Brace Jovanovich, 1982. pp 407–408
  - R. Travers Herford, Christianity in Talmud and Midrash, KTAV Publishing House Inc, 2007. pp 35–96
  - C. H. Dodd, Historical Tradition in the Fourth Gospel, Cambridge University Press, 1976. pp 303–305

== Possible Talmudic references ==
There are several Talmudic passages that are said to be referring to Jesus. The following are among those considered the most controversial, contested, and possibly the most notable.

Our rabbis taught Jesus the Nazarene had five disciples, and these are they: Mattai, Nakai, Netzer, Buni, and Todah.

The master said: Jesus the Nazarene practiced magic and deceived and led Israel astray.

"Jesus son of Stada is Jesus son of Pandira?"

Rav Hisda said, "The husband was Stada and the lover was Pandera."

"But was not the husband Pappos son of Yehuda and the mother Stada?"

No, his mother was Miriam, who let her hair grow long and was called Stada. Pumbedita says about her: "She was unfaithful to her husband."

On the eve of Passover, Jesus the Nazarene was hanged and a herald went forth before him forty days heralding, "Jesus the Nazarene is going forth to be stoned because he practiced sorcery and instigated and seduced Israel to idolatry. Whoever knows anything in defense may come and state it." But since they did not find anything in his defense they hanged him on the eve of Passover. Ulla said: "Do you suppose that Jesus the Nazarene was one for whom a defense could be made? He was a mesit (someone who instigated Israel to idolatry), concerning whom the Merciful [God] says: Show him no compassion and do not shield him (Deut. 13:9). With Jesus the Nazarene it was different. For he was close to the government."

There are still noticeable challenges to the identification of Yeshu as Jesus, as elsewhere in the Talmud his stepfather, Pappos ben Yehuda, is mentioned as being martyred with Rabbi Akiva and is himself mentioned as being among the Pharisees returning to Israel following their persecution by John Hyrcanus, which would place Yeshu's lifetime anywhere between 130 after and 70 years before the birth of Jesus.

=== Specific references ===
Sanhedrin 43a relates the trial and execution of a sorcerer named Jesus (Yeshu in Hebrew) and his five disciples. The sorcerer is stoned and hanged on the Eve of Passover.

Sanhedrin 107 tells of a Jesus ("Yeshu") who "offended his teacher by paying too much attention to the inn-keeper's wife. Jesus wished to be forgiven, but [his rabbi] was too slow to forgive him, and Jesus in despair went away and put up a brick [idol] and worshipped it."

In Gittin 56b and 57a, a story is told in which Onkelos summons up the spirit of “the sinner(s) of Israel”. He describes his punishment in the afterlife as boiling in excrement.

Some scholars claim that the Hebrew name Yeshu is not a short form of the name Yeshua, but rather an acrostic for the Hebrew phrase "may his name and memory be blotted out" created by taking the first letter of the Hebrew words.

In addition, at the 1240 Disputation of Paris, Nicholas Donin presented the allegation that the Talmud was blasphemous towards Mary, the mother of Jesus (Miriam in Hebrew), and this criticism has been repeated by many Christian sources. The texts cited by critics include Sanhedrin 67a, Sanhedrin 106a, and Shabbath 104b. However, the references to Mary are not specific, and some assert that they do not refer to Jesus' mother, or perhaps refer to Mary Magdalen.

=== Summary ===
Scholars have identified the following references in the Talmud that some conclude refer to Jesus:

- Jesus as a sorcerer with disciples (b Sanh 43a–b)
- Healing in the name of Jesus (Hul 2:22f; AZ 2:22/12; y Shab 124:4/13; QohR 1:8; b AZ 27b)
- As a Torah teacher (b AZ 17a; Hul 2:24; QohR 1:8)
- As a son or disciple that turned out badly (Sanh 103a/b; Ber 17b)
- As a frivolous disciple who practiced magic and turned to idolatry (Sanh 107b; Sot 47a)
- Jesus' punishment in afterlife (b Git 56b, 57a)
- Jesus' execution (b Sanh 43a-b)
- Jesus as the son of Mary (Shab 104b, Sanh 67a)

=== As a sorcerer with disciples ===
Sanhedrin 43a relates the trial and execution of Jesus and his five disciples. Here, Jesus is a sorcerer who has enticed other Jews to apostasy. A herald is sent to call for witnesses in his favour for forty days before his execution. No one comes forth and in the end he is stoned and hanged on the Eve of Passover. His five disciples, named Mattai, Nakai, Netzer, Buni, and Todah are then tried. Word play is made on each of their names, and they are executed. It is mentioned that leniency could not be applied because of Jesus' influence with the royal government (malkhut).

The full passage is:

The Rabbis taught, Yeshu had five disciples: Mattai, Nakai, Netzer, Buni, and Todah. They brought Mattai in, he said, "Shall Mattai be executed? Isn't it written, ‘When (māṯay) can I go and meet with God?’" They said to him, "Yes, Mattai shall be executed, for it is written, ‘When (māṯay) will he die and his name perish?’"

They brought Nakai in, he said, "Shall Nakai be executed? Isn't it written, ‘Do not kill the innocent (nāqī) and righteous’?" They said to him, ‘Yes, Nakai shall be executed, for it is written, ‘In the hiding places he kills the innocent (nāqī).’"

They brought Netzer in, he said, "Shall Netzer be executed? Isn't it written, ‘and a branch (nēṣer) shall grow out of his roots’?" They said to him, ‘Yes, Netzer shall be executed, for it is written, ‘But you are cast out of your tomb like a rejected branch (nēṣer).’"

They brought Buni in, he said, "Shall Buni be executed? Isn't it written, ‘Israel is my firstborn son (bənī)’?" They said to him, "Yes, Buni shall be executed, for it is written, ‘I will kill your firstborn son (bīnḵā).’"

They brought Todah in, he said, "Shall Todah be executed? Isn't it written, ‘A psalm of thanksgiving (tōḏā)’?" They said to him, "Yes, Todah shall be executed, for it is written, ‘The one who offers thanksgiving (tōḏā) as his sacrifice glorifies Me.’"

— Sanhedrin 43a

=== Healing in the name of Jesus ===
Scholars have identified passages in the Talmud and associated Talmudic texts that involve invoking Jesus' name, as the messiah of Christianity, in order to perform magical healing:

- Tosefta Hullin 2:22f – "Jacob ... came to heal him in the name of Jesus son of Pantera" - this section exists in variant spellings of Jesus: mi-shem Yeshu ben Pantera (principal edition), mi-shem Yeshu ben Pandera (London MS), mi-shem Yeshua ben Pantera (Vienna MS)
- Jerusalem Abodah Zarah 2:2/12 – "Jacob ... came to heal him. He said to him: we will speak to you in the name of Jesus son of Pandera" (Editions or MS: Venice)
- Jerusalem Shabboth 14:4/13 – "Jacob ... came in the name of Jesus Pandera to heal him" (Editions or MS: Venice)
- Qohelet Rabbah 1:8(3) – "Jacob ... came to heal him in the name of Jesus son of Pandera" (Editions or MSs: Vatican 291, Oxford 164, Pesaro 1519)
- Babylonian Abodah Zarah 27b – "Jacob ... came to heal him" (Editions or MSs: New York 15, Pearo, Vilna)

The full passage in the Talmud Bavli is:

(The Gemara) raises an objection: A person may not engage in dealings with heretics, and one may not be treated by them even in (cases of) life (-or-death matters).

A story of ben Dama, son of Rabbi Ishmael's sister, who was bitten by a snake. Jacob, a man of Sekhanya village, came to heal him, but Rabbi Ishmael did not let him. And (ben Dama) said to him, "Rabbi Ishmael, my brother, let him go, and I will be healed by him. I will cite a verse from the Torah (to prove) that this is permitted." But (ben Dama) did not manage to complete the statement before his soul departed, and he died.

Rabbi Ishmael recited with regard to him: "Fortunate are you, ben Dama, as your body is pure and your soul departed in purity, and you did not transgress the statement of your colleagues, who would state the verse: ‘And who breaks through a fence, a snake shall bite him.’"

— Avodah Zarah, 27b

Whereas in the Talmud Yerushalmi, the passage is the following:

A story of Ribbi Eleazer ben Dama, who was bitten by a snake. Jacob, a man of the village Sama, came to heal him in the name of Yeshu (ben) Pandera, but Ribbi Ishmael did not let him. (Eleazer) told (Ishmael), "I shall bring proof that he can heal me." But, he could not bring proof before he died. Ribbi Ishmael said, "Blessed are you, ben Dama, that you left this world in peace and did not tear down the fences of the Sages, as it is written, ‘And who breaks through a fence, a snake shall bite him.’" But did a snake not bite him (before such a dilemma even occurred)? It will not bite him in the World to Come. What could (Eleazar) have said? "Keep My decrees and laws, for the person who obeys them will live by them."

— Shabbat 14

Scholars also identify a separate account, featured exclusively in the Jerusalem Talmud, which contains an additional account of healing performed in the name of "Yeshu (ben) Pandera":

- Jerusalem Abodah Zarah 2:2/7 – "someone ... whispered to him in the name of Jesus son of Pandera" (Editions or MS: Venice)
- Jerusalem Shabboth 14:4/8 – "someone ... whispered to him in the name of Jesus son of Pandera" (Editions or MS: Venice)

The full passage is:

Ribbi Joshua ben Levi had colic. Ribbi Hanina and Ribbi Jonathan told him to grind taḥlusin [either unripe dates or watercresses] on the Sabbath, put them in aged wine, and drink it to avoid being endangered.

His son's son was choking. A person came and whispered to him in the name of Yeshu (ben) Pandera, and he could breathe. As he left, (Joshua) asked him, "What did you whisper to him?" (The person answered:) "So-and-so words." (Joshua) said to him, "It would have been better that he died and not heard such things. It happened to him like an erroneous order from a ruler."

— Shabbat 14

=== Torah teacher ===
Scholars have identified passages that mention Jesus, as the messiah of Christianity, in the context of a Torah teacher:

- Babylonian Abodah Zarah 17a – "One of the disciples of Jesus the Nazarene found me" (Editions or MSs: Munich 95, Paris 1377, New York 15)
- Babylonian Abodah Zarah 17a – "Thus I was taught by Jesus the Nazarene" (Editions or MSs: Munich 95, Paris 1337)
- Tosefta Hullin 2:24 – "He told me of a word of heresy in the name of Jesus son of Pantiri"
- Qohelet Rabbah 1:8(3) – "He told me a word in the name of Jesus son of Pandera" (Editions or MSs: Oxford 164, Vatican 291, Pesaro 1519)

The full passage is:

(Rabbi Eliezer) said to him: "Akiva, you have reminded me; once I was walking in the upper markets of Sepphoris, and I found a man of the students of Yeshu, and his name was Jacob, of the village Sekhanya. He said to me, "It is written in your Torah, ‘You shall not bring the fee of a prostitute...’ What is (the halakha), (is it permitted) to make, from (the fee of a prostitute) a bathroom for a High Priest?" And I said nothing to him.

He said to me, "Yeshu taught me that (it is indeed permitted, for it is written): ‘Since she gathered her gifts from the wages of prostitutes, as the wages of prostitutes they will again be used.’ (The coins) came from a place of filth, let them go towards a place of filth."

And I derived pleasure from the statement, and due to this, I was arrested for heresy...

— Avodah Zarah, 17a

=== The son or disciple who turned out badly ===
Sanhedrin 103a and Berachot 17b talk about a Yeshu ha-Nosri (Jesus of Nazareth) who "burns his food in public", possibly a reference to pagan sacrifices or a metaphor for apostasy. The account is discussing Manasseh the king of Judah infamous for having turned to idolatry and having persecuted the Jews (2 Kings 21). It is part of a larger discussion about three kings and four commoners excluded from paradise. These are also discussed in the Shulkhan Arukh where the son who burns his food is explicitly stated to be Manasseh. The passages identified by scholars in this context are:

- Babylonian Sanhedrin 103a – "that you will not have a son or disciple ... like Jesus the Nazarene" (Editions or MSs: Firenze II.1.8–9, Barco, Munich 95)
- Babylonian Berakoth 17b – "that we will not have a son or disciple ... like Jesus the Nazarene" (Editions or MS: Oxford 23)

The full passages are:

Alternatively, the phrase "no evil shall befall you" means that you will be frightened neither by bad dreams nor by evil thoughts. "Nor shall any plague come near your tent", that you will not have a child or student who overcooks his food in public, i.e., sins in public and causes others to sin, such as [Yeshu].

— Sanhedrin 103a

"There is no breach", that our faction should not be like the faction of David, from which Ahitophel emerged. "And no going forth", that our faction should not be like the faction of Saul, from which Doeg the Edomite emerged. “And no outcry”; that our faction should not be like the faction of Elisha, from which Gehazi emerged. "In our open places", that we should not have a child or student who overcooks his food in public, as Yeshu (did).

— Berakhot 17b

=== As a sinful student who practiced magic and turned to idolatry ===
Passages in Sanhedrin 107b and Sotah 47a refer to an individual (Yeshu) that some scholars conclude is a reference to Jesus, regarded as the messiah of Christianity. In these passages, Jesus is described as a student of Joshua ben Perachiah (second half of the 2nd century BCE), and he (Jesus) was sent away for misinterpreting a word that in context should have been understood as referring to the Inn; he instead understood it to mean the innkeeper's wife (the same word can mean "inn" and "hostess"). His teacher said "Here is a nice inn", to which he replied "Her eyes are crooked", to which his teacher responded "Evil one! Is this what you are occupied in?" (Gazing at married women was considered sinful.) After several returns for forgiveness he mistook Perachiah's signal to wait a moment as a signal of final rejection, and so he turned to idolatry. Some passages that have been identified by scholars as mentioning Jesus, as the messiah of Christianity, in this context include:

- Babylonian Sanhedrin 107b – "not as Yehoshua b. Perahya who pushed Jesus the Nazarene away" (Editions or MSs: Barco, Vilna)
- Babylonian Sotah 47a – "not as Yehoshua b. Perahya who pushed Jesus the Nazarene away" (Editions or MSs: Vatican 110, Vilna, Munich 95)
- Babylonian Sanhedrin 107b – "Jesus said to him: Rabbi, her eyes are narrow" (Editions or MSs: Herzog 1)
- Babylonian Sotah 47a – "Jesus the Nazarene said to him: Rabbi, her eyes are narrow" (Editions or MS: Oxford 20)
- Babylonian Sanhedrin 107b – "The master said: Jesus the Nazarene practiced magic (Editions or MSs: Firenze II.1.8–9, Barco )
- Babylonian Sotah 47a – "The master said: Jesus the Nazarene because he practiced magic" (Editions or MS: Munich 95)

The full passage is:

It should always be (the) left (hand) to push (away), and (the) right (to) bring closeward. Not like Elisha who pushed Gehazi (away) with both hands, and not like Joshua ben Perachiah who pushed Yeshu, (one of) his students, with both hands...

When King Yannai was executing the Rabbis, Simeon ben Shetach was hidden by his sister (and) Rabbi Joshua ben Perachiah went (and) fled to Alexandria of Egypt. When peace was made, Simeon ben Shetach sent him (the following letter): "From me, Jerusalem the holy city, to you, Alexandria of Egypt, my sister. My husband dwells amongst you, and I am sitting lonely". (Joshua ben Perachiah) said "I learn from (the letter) that there is peace!"

When he came, (they) arrived at an inn. (The innkeeper) stood before him with exemplary honor, and accorded him great honors. (Joshua) sat and was praising them, (saying): "How beautiful this ʾaḵsanyāʾ is!" Yeshu said to him, "My master, her eyes are narrow." (Joshua) said to him "Wicked one, is this how you conduct yourself?!" He brought out four hundred shofarot and excommunicated him. Every day, (Yeshu) would come before him, but (Joshua) did not accept him.

One day (Joshua) was reciting the Shema, (Yeshu) came before him. He intended to welcome him (this time), so he signaled (Yeshu) with his hands (to wait). (Yeshu) thought he was rejecting him. (Yeshu) went and erected brickwork, and worshipped it (as an idol). (Joshua) said to him "Return thyself!" (Yeshu) said to him "This I learned from you: Anyone who sins and causes the masses to sin is not given the opportunity to repent!"

— Sotah 47a, Sanhedrin 107

The story ends by invoking a Mishnaic era teaching that Yeshu practised black magic, deceived and led Israel astray. This quote is seen by some as an explanation in general for the designation Yeshu.

According to Dr. Rubenstein, the account in Sanhedrin 107b recognizes the kinship between Christians and Jews, since Jesus is presented as a disciple of a prominent Rabbi. But it also reflects and speaks to an anxiety fundamental to Rabbinic Judaism. Prior to the destruction of the Temple in 70, Jews were divided into different sects, each promoting different interpretations of the law. Rabbinic Judaism domesticated and internalized conflicts over the law, while vigorously condemning any sectarianism. In other words, rabbis are encouraged to disagree and argue with one another, but these activities must be carefully contained, or else they could lead to a schism. Although this story may not present a historically accurate account of Jesus' life, it does use a fiction about Jesus to communicate an important truth about the Rabbis. Moreover, Rubenstein sees this story as a rebuke to overly harsh Rabbis. Boyarin suggests that the Rabbis were well aware of Christian views of the Pharisees and that this story acknowledges the Christian belief that Jesus was forgiving and the Pharisees were not (see Mark 2:1–2), while emphasizing forgiveness as a necessary Rabbinic value.

=== Punishment in the afterlife ===
In Gittin 56b–57a a story is recorded in which Onkelos, a nephew of the Roman emperor Titus who destroyed the Second Temple, intent on converting to Judaism, summons up the spirits of Yeshu the Nazarene and others to help make up his mind. Each describes his punishment in the afterlife.

The complete passage from the 1935 Soncino edition is:

Onkelos the son of Callinicus, son of the sister of Titus, desired to convert himself (to Judaism)...

(Onkelos) went (and) he conjured Yeshu the Nazarene (from the grave). (Onkelos) said (to Yeshu), "Who is of importance in that world?" (Yeshu) said (to him), "Israel." (Onkelos further queried) "Should I attach (myself) to them?" He (Yeshu) said; "Their welfare you shall seek, their misfortune you shall not seek, for anyone who touches them is regarded as if he were touching the apple of his eye".

(Onkelos) said to (Yeshu), "What is the punishment of that man (who seeks their misfortune)?" (Yeshu) said (to Onkelos), "boiling in excrement". As the Master said: Anyone who mocks the words of the Sages will be sentenced to boiling excrement.

(As said in the Gemara:) Come see the difference between the sinners of Israel and the prophets of the nations of the world.

— Gittin 57a

=== Execution ===
Scholars have identified passages that mention Jesus in the context of his execution:

- Babylonian Sanhedrin 43a–b – "on the eve of Passover they hanged Jesus the Nazarene" (Editions or MSs: Herzog 1, Karlsruhe 2)
- Babylonian Sanhedrin 43a–b – "Jesus the Nazarene is going forth to be stoned" (Editions or MSs: Herzog 1, Firenze II.1.8–9, Karlsruhe 2)
- Babylonian Sanhedrin 43a–b – "Do you suppose Jesus the Nazarene was one for whom a defense could be made?" (Editions or MSs: Herzog 1, Firenze II.1.8–9, Karlsruhe 2)
- Babylonian Sanhedrin 43a–b – "With Jesus the Nazarene it was different" (Editions or MSs: Herzog 1, Firenze II.1.8–9, Karlsruhe 2)

The full passage is:

(The Mishna asserts) a crier goes out before (a man condemned to execution). Before him (i.e. when he is being led to execution), yes; but from the outset (i.e. before his conviction), no. But isn't it taught that on Passover Eve, they hanged Yeshu (after he was killed by stoning)? And a crier went out before him (for) forty days, (proclaiming): "Yeshu is to be stoned because he practiced sorcery, incited (idolatry), and lead the Jewish people astray. Anyone who knows (a reason to) acquit him should come (forward) and reveal it on his behalf!" And they did not find (a reason) to acquit him, and they hanged him on Passover Eve.

Ulla said, "And (how can) you understand? (Was) Yeshu worthy of a search to acquit him? He was an inciter, and the Merciful One states, ‘Neither shall you spare, neither shall you conceal him.’ But, Yeshu was different, as he was close with the government."

— Sanhedrin 43a

In the Florence manuscript of the Talmud (1177 CE) an addition is made to Sanhedrin 43a saying that Yeshu was hanged on the eve of the Sabbath.

=== Mother and father ===
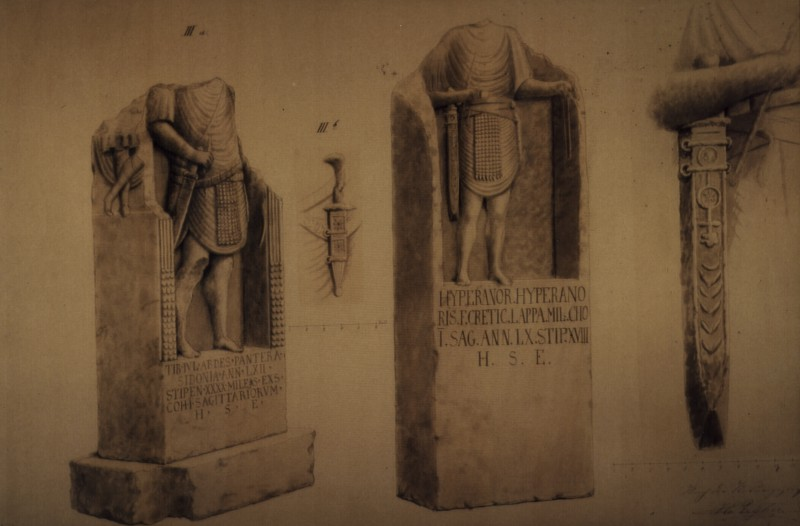
Tombstone of Tiberius Julius Abdes Pantera, a soldier who has been claimed to be the "Pantera" named by Talmud

Some Talmudic sources include passages which identify a "son of Pandera" (ben Pandera in Hebrew), and some scholars see it as referencing the messiah of Christianity. Medieval Hebrew midrashic literature contain the "Episode of Jesus" (known also as Maaseh Yeshu), in which Jesus is described as being the son of Joseph, the son of Pandera (see: Episode of Jesus). The account portrays Jesus as an impostor.

The Talmud, and other talmudic texts, contain several references to the "son of Pandera". A few of the references name Jesus ("Yeshu") as the "son of Pandera": these connections are found in the Tosefta, the Qohelet Rabbah, and the Jerusalem Talmud, but not in the Babylonian Talmud. The connections said to be found in the Jerusalem Talmud are debated because the name "Jesus" ("Yeshu") is found only in a marginal gloss in some manuscripts, but other scholars see it as being in the original versions of the Jerusalem Talmud.

The texts include several spellings for the father's name (Pandera, Panthera, Pandira, Pantiri, or Pantera) and some scholars conclude that these are all references to the same individual, but other scholars suggest that they may be unrelated references. In some of the texts, the father produced a son with a woman named Mary. Several of the texts indicate that the mother was not married to Pandera, and was committing adultery and – by implication – Jesus was a bastard child. Some of the texts indicate that Mary's husband's name was Stada.

Some Talmudic sources include passages which identify a "son of Stada" or "son of Stara" (ben Stada or ben Stara in Hebrew), and some scholars conclude that these are references to the messiah of Christianity.

==== Son of Pantera / Pandera in a healing context ====
Two talmudic-era texts that explicitly associate Jesus as the son of Pantera/Pandera are:

- Tosefta Hullin 2:22f "Jacob ... came to heal him in the name of Jesus son of Pantera"
- Qohelet Rabbah 1:8(3) "Jacob ... came to heal him in the name of Jesus son of Pandera"

Both of the above passages describe situations where Jesus' name is invoked to perform magical healing. In addition, some editions of the Jerusalem Talmud explicitly identify Jesus as the son of Pandera:

- Jerusalem Abodah Zarah 2:2/7 "someone ... whispered to him in the name of Jesus son of Pandera"
- Jerusalem Shabboth 14:4/8 "someone ... whispered to him in the name of Jesus son of Pandera"
- Jerusalem Abodah Zarah 2:2/12 "Jacob ... came to heal him. He said to him: we will speak to you in the name of Jesus son of Pandera"
- Jerusalem Shabboth 14:4/13 "Jacob ... came in the name of Jesus Pandera to heal him"

However, some editions of the Jerusalem Talmud do not contain the name Jesus in these passages, so the association in this case is disputed. The parallel passages in the Babylonian Talmud do not contain the name Jesus.

==== Son of Pantiri / Pandera in a teaching context ====
Other Talmudic narratives describe Jesus as the son of a Pantiri or Pandera, in a teaching context:

- Tosefta Hullin 2:24 "He told me of a word of heresy in the name of Jesus son of Pantiri"
- Qohelet Rabbah 1:8(3) "He told me a word in the name of Jesus son of Pandera"

However, the parallel accounts in the Babylonian Talmud mention Jesus but do not mention the father's name:

- Babylonian Abodah Zarah 17a "One of the disciples of Jesus the Nazarene found me"
- Babylonian Abodah Zarah 17a "Thus I was taught by Jesus the Nazarene"

==== Pandera and alleged adultery by Mary ====
The Babylonian talmud contains narratives that discuss an anonymous person who brought witchcraft out of Egypt, and the person is identified as "son of Pandera" or "son of Stada". The Talmud discusses whether the individual (the name Jesus is not present in these passages) is the son of Stada, or Pandera, and a suggestion is made that the mother Mary committed adultery.

- Babylonian Shabbat 104b "Was he the son of Stara (and not) the son of Pandera?" (Editions or MSs: Oxford 23, Soncino)
- Babylonian Sanhedrin 67a "Was he the son of Stara (and not) the son of Pandera?" (Editions or MSs: Herzog 1, Karlsruhe 2, ...)
- Babylonian Shabbat 104b "husband Stada, lover Pandera" (Editions or MSs: Vatican 108, Munich 95, Vilna)
- Babylonian Sanhedrin 67a "husband Stara, lover Pandera" (Editions or MSs: Herzog 1, Barco)
- Babylonian Shabbat 104b "husband Pappos, mother Stada" (Editions or MSs: Vilna, Munich 95)
- Babylonian Sanhedrin 67a "husband Pappos, mother Stada" (Editions or MSs: Vilna, Munich 95)
- Babylonian Shabbat 104b "his mother Miriam who let grow (her) women's hair" (Editions or MSs: Vilna, Oxford 23, Soncino)
- Babylonian Sanhedrin 67a "his mother Miriam who let grow (her) women's hair" (Editions or MSs: Karlsruhe 2, Munich 95)

The full passage is as follows:

And (the court) did the same to ben Stada of Lod, and they hanged him on Passover Eve.

(The Gemara asks: Why is he called) ben "Stada" (when) he was the son of Pandera? Rav Chisda says: "(Perhaps his mother's) husband was Stada, (but his mother's) lover was Pandera. (The Gemara challenges this, saying the) husband was Pappos ben Yehudah. Therefore, his mother was Stada. (The Gemara challenges this too, saying) his mother was Miriam, who braided women's hair. As they say in Pumbedita: This one strayed (səṭat dāʾ) from her husband.

— Sanhedrin 67a

==== Christians ====
Typically both Jerusalem and Babylonian Talmuds use the generic minim for heretics. Aside from mentions of the five disciples of "Yeshu ha Notzri," the plural Notzrim, "Christians," are only clearly mentioned once in the Babylonian Talmud (where it is amended to Netzarim, people of the watch) in B. Ta'anit 27b with a late parallel in Masekhet Soferim 17:4. And then "The day of the Notzri according to Rabbi Ishmael is forbidden for ever" in some texts of B. Avodah Zarah 6a.

== Relation to the Toledot Yeshu ==
The Toledot Yeshu (History of Jesus) is a Jewish anti-Christian polemic that purports to be a biography of Jesus. The work is an early account of Jesus, based on contemporary Jewish views, in which Jesus is described as being the son of Joseph, the son of Pandera (see a translation of the Yemenite text: Episode of Jesus, or what is also known as Toledot Yeshu). Some scholars conclude that the work is merely an expansion and elaboration on anti-Christian themes in the Talmud. Stephen Gero suggests that an early version of the Toledot Yeshu narrative preceded the Talmud, and that the Talmud drew upon the Toledot Yeshu, but Rubenstein and Schäfer discount that possibility, because they date the origin of the Toledot Yeshu in the early Middle Ages or Late Antiquity.

== Related narrative from Celsus ==
The Platonistic philosopher Celsus (circa 150 to 200 CE) in his treatise The True Word wrote a narrative describing a Jew who discounts the story of the Virgin Birth of Jesus. Scholars have remarked on the parallels (adultery, father's name "Panthera", return from Egypt, magical powers) between Celsus' account and the Talmudic narratives. In Celsus' account, the Jew says:

"... [Jesus] came from a Jewish village and from a poor country woman who earned her living by spinning. He says that she was driven out by her husband, who was a carpenter by trade, as she was convicted of adultery. Then he says that after she had been driven out by her husband and while she was wandering about in a disgraceful way she secretly gave birth to Jesus. He states that because he [Jesus] was poor he hired himself out as a workman in Egypt, and there tried his hand at certain magical powers on which the Egyptians pride themselves; he returned full of conceit, because of these powers, and on account of them gave himself the title of God ... the mother of Jesus is described as having been turned out by the carpenter who was betrothed to her, as she had been convicted of adultery and had a child by a certain soldier named Panthera."

== See also ==
- Benjamin Urrutia
- Birkat haMinim
- Criticism of the Talmud
- Gamaliel
- Historicity of Jesus
- Judaism and Christianity
- Judaism's view of Jesus
- Life of Jesus in the New Testament
- Rejection of Jesus
- The Talmud Unmasked
- Toledot Yeshu

== Bibliography ==
- Boyarin, Daniel: Dying for God, Stanford University Press, 1999
- Carroll, James, Constantine's sword: the church and the Jews : a history, Houghton Mifflin Harcourt, 2002
- Cohn-Sherbok, Dan, Judaism and other faiths, Palgrave Macmillan, 1994
- Dalman, Gustav: Jesus Christ in the Talmud, Midrash, Zohar, and the Liturgy of the Synagogue, Deighton, Bell, and Co., 1893
- Eisenmenger, Johann Andreas. Entdecktes Judenthum, 1711. English translations: 1732–34 by J.P. Stekelin "The Traditions of the Jews, with the Expositions and Doctrines of the Rabbins,"; English translation re-published in 2006 as "The traditions of the Jews", by Independent History & Research. German edition online here .
- Goldstein, Morris, Jesus in the Jewish Tradition, Macmillan, 1950
- Herford, R. Travers, Christianity in Talmud and Midrash, London: Williams & Norgate, 1903 (reprint New York, KTAV, 1975)
- Hirshman, Mark, A Rivalry of Genius: Jewish and Christian Biblical Interpretation in Late Antiquity trans. Baya Stein. Albany: SUNY Press 1996
- Klausner, Joseph, Yeshu ha-Notzri (Hebrew), Shtible, 1922. Translated and reprinted as Jesus of Nazareth, Beacon Books, 1964; translated and reprinted as Jesus of Nazareth, Bloch, 1989
- Krauss, Samuel, Das Leben Jesu nach judischen Quellen, Berlin: S. Calvary, 1902
- Laible, Heinrich, Jesus Christus im Thalmud (Jesus Christ in the Talmud), 1893. English translation published 2010 by General Books
- Daniel J. Lasker, 2007, Ben-Gurion University of the Negev, Israel ""Introduction to 2006 Reprint Edition", of Christianity in Talmud and Midrash, by R. Travers Herford, KTAV Publishing House, Inc., 2007
- Lauterbach, Jacob Z., "Jesus in the Talmud” in Rabbinic Essays, Cincinnati: Hebrew Union College Press, 1951 (reprinted by Ktav, 1973).
- Johann Maier, Jesus von Nazareth in der talmudischen Uberlieferung, Buchgesellschaft, 1978.
- Murcia Thierry, Jésus dans le Talmud et la littérature rabbinique ancienne, Turnhout, 2014; «Témoignages juifs et païens sur Jésus et sur le premier christianisme: la tradition rabbinique», dans Premiers Écrits chrétiens, Gallimard, Bibliothèque de la Pléiade, Paris, 2016.
- Neusner, Jacob, Judaism in the Matrix of Christianity Philadelphia: Fortress Press 1986
- Pick, Bernhard, The Talmud: what it is and what it says about Jesus and the Christians, 1887 (reprinted Kessinger Publishing, 2007)
- Rubenstein, Jeffrey, Stories of the Babylonian Talmud (cited as "Rubenstein SBT"), JHU Press, 2010
- Rubenstein, Jeffrey, Rabbinic Stories (cited as "Rubenstein"), New York: The Paulist Press, 2002
- Schäfer, Peter, Jesus in the Talmud, Princeton University Press, 2007
- Seidman, Naomi, Faithful Renderings: Jewish-Christian Difference and the Politics of Translation, University of Chicago Press, 2006
- Strack, Hermann: Jesus, die Haretiker und die Christen nach den altesten judischen Angaben, Leipzig: J. C. Hinrichs'sche Buchhandlung, 1910
- Theissen, Gerd, Annette Merz, The Historical Jesus: A Comprehensive Guide, Fortress Press, 1998
- Van Voorst, Robert E.: Jesus outside the New Testament, Wm. B. Eerdmans Publishing, 2000
