= Joseph Albo =

Jewish philosopher

Joseph Albo (Hebrew: יוסף אלבו; c. 1380 – c. 1444, possibly 1430) was a 15th-century Spanish Jewish rabbi, preacher, and philosopher, best known as the author of Sefer ha-Ikkarim ("Book of Principles"), a major philosophical exposition of the fundamentals of Judaism. His thought was strongly influenced by his teacher Hasdai Crescas, while also displaying familiarity with Islamic philosophy, Christian scholasticism, and, to some extent, the writings of Arab Aristotelians.

== Biography ==
Albo's birthplace is generally assumed to have been Monreal del Campo in Aragon. This identification rests on Astruc ha-Levi's account of the Disputation of Tortosa of 1413–1414, which lists Albo among the Jewish participants and describes him as the representative of the congregation of Monreal; the surviving Latin account of the disputation, however, does not associate him with that locality.

His year of birth is likewise uncertain. Heinrich Graetz argued that Albo could not have been younger than thirty when he was sent to participate in the Tortosa disputation and therefore placed his birth no later than 1380. His death is variously dated to 1430 or 1444, the latter being regarded as the more likely date; he is, however, recorded as preaching in Soria in 1433.

Albo was a student of Hasdai Crescas, author of Or Adonai, whose teaching exercised a substantial influence on his own thought. It is uncertain whether Crescas was still alive when Sefer ha-Ikkarim appeared. Albo's frequent use of medical illustrations has also been taken to suggest that he possessed considerable medical knowledge and may have practised medicine.

== Sefer ha-Ikkarim ==
Albo's principal work, Sefer ha-Ikkarim ("Book of Principles"), was completed at Soria in 1425. It presents a reasoned account of the fundamental articles of the Jewish faith interpreted in the light of contemporary philosophical ideas. Albo summarized his rational approach in the statement that the "Torah does not require us to believe absurdities". The work reflects his familiarity with Islamic philosophy and Christian scholasticism as well as the strong influence of Crescas.

In contrast to the Maimonidean scheme of thirteen principles and Crescas's six, Albo reduced the fundamental principles of Judaism to three: the existence of God, although he maintained that "God has no definition"; divine revelation; and divine reward and punishment. To these he added eight further derivative principles. Subordinate to the fundamental principles he identified six dogmas: the creation of the world ex nihilo; the status of Moses as the supreme prophet; the continuing validity of Mosaic law; the possibility of attaining human perfection; the resurrection of the dead; and the coming of the Messiah.

Sefer ha-Ikkarim achieved considerable popularity and appeared in numerous editions, becoming Albo's best-known contribution to medieval Jewish philosophy.
