= Johann Maier (talmudic scholar) =

Austrian biblical scholar (1933–2019)

Johann Maier (15 May 1933 – 16 March 2019) was an Austrian scholar of Judaism, and was founder and, for thirty years, director of the Martin Buber Institute for Jewish Studies at the University of Cologne. He retired in 1996, and was living in Mittenwald, in Upper Bavaria.

Maier was appointed director of the Martin Buber Institute for Jewish Studies at its founding in Spring 1966. This was the second of three faculties of Jewish studies in Germany after the Free University of Berlin (1963, Prof Jacob Taube) and before the University of Frankfurt (1969, Prof. Arnold Goldberg).

== Areas of research ==
=== Judaism and philosophy ===
Following on from the naming of the institute in Cologne after Martin Buber, one of Maier's principal areas of research was on the relationship between Jewish and general philosophy – such as Intellektualismus und Mystik als Faktoren jüdischer Selbstdefinition (1985) where Maier noted that question as to the existence of “Jewish” philosophy, and its essence forces the question as to the essence, identity, and continuity of Jewish culture.

=== Talmudic research ===
One of Johann Maier's notable areas of research is regarding the dating and origin of passages relating to Jesus in the Talmud. Many scholars, such as Joseph Klausner see possible traces of the historical Jesus in tannaitic (20-220 CE) and amoraic (230-500 CE) passages in the Talmud. Maier's research led him in Jesus von Nazareth in der talmudischen Überlieferung (1978) to deny the possibility that there are any authentic tannaitic Jesus passages and even declares the amoraic passages as all belonging to the post-talmudic (600-1000 CE) rather than to the talmudic period. Maier views that “authentic” Jesus passages occur only in the very late talmudic and more so the post-talmudic sources. For example, Maier views that Sanhedrin 43a did not originally refer to Jesus of Nazareth, and the identification of the condemned sorcerer as Jesus has nothing to do with the original context, and should probably be ascribed, in Maier's view, to post-Talmudic redaction of a passage originally told of a second-century magician, ben Pandera. Likewise the list of charges found applied to Jesus at Sanhedrin 107b originally referred to Gehazi. Maier's argument that the name Yeshu in the texts is a later interpolation depends in part on his general conclusion that Palestinian Jewry was unconcerned with Christianity before Constantine. Van Voorst (2000) has depicted Maier's position that the Jesus references in the Talmud were added later in the Middle Ages as the other extreme of the more uncritical early view of R. Travers Herford (1906) who took all texts as being original.

=== Other works ===
- Maier, J. Judentum von A bis Z: Glauben, Geschichte, Kultur 2001
- Maier, J. Geschichte der jüdischen Religion Berlin 1972; Freiburg 1992
- Maier, J. Das Judentum Munich 1973 - one of the main reference works on Judaism in German.
- The Judaic System of the Dead Sea Scrolls in Jacob Neusner, ed., Judaism in Late Antiquity, 2, pp. 84–108. 2004
- Maier J, Die Kabbalah. 1995 - an introduction to Kabbalah.

He was the editor of Judentum und Umwelt.
