= Disputation of Paris =

Disputation over the Talmud at the court of French King Louis IX (1240)

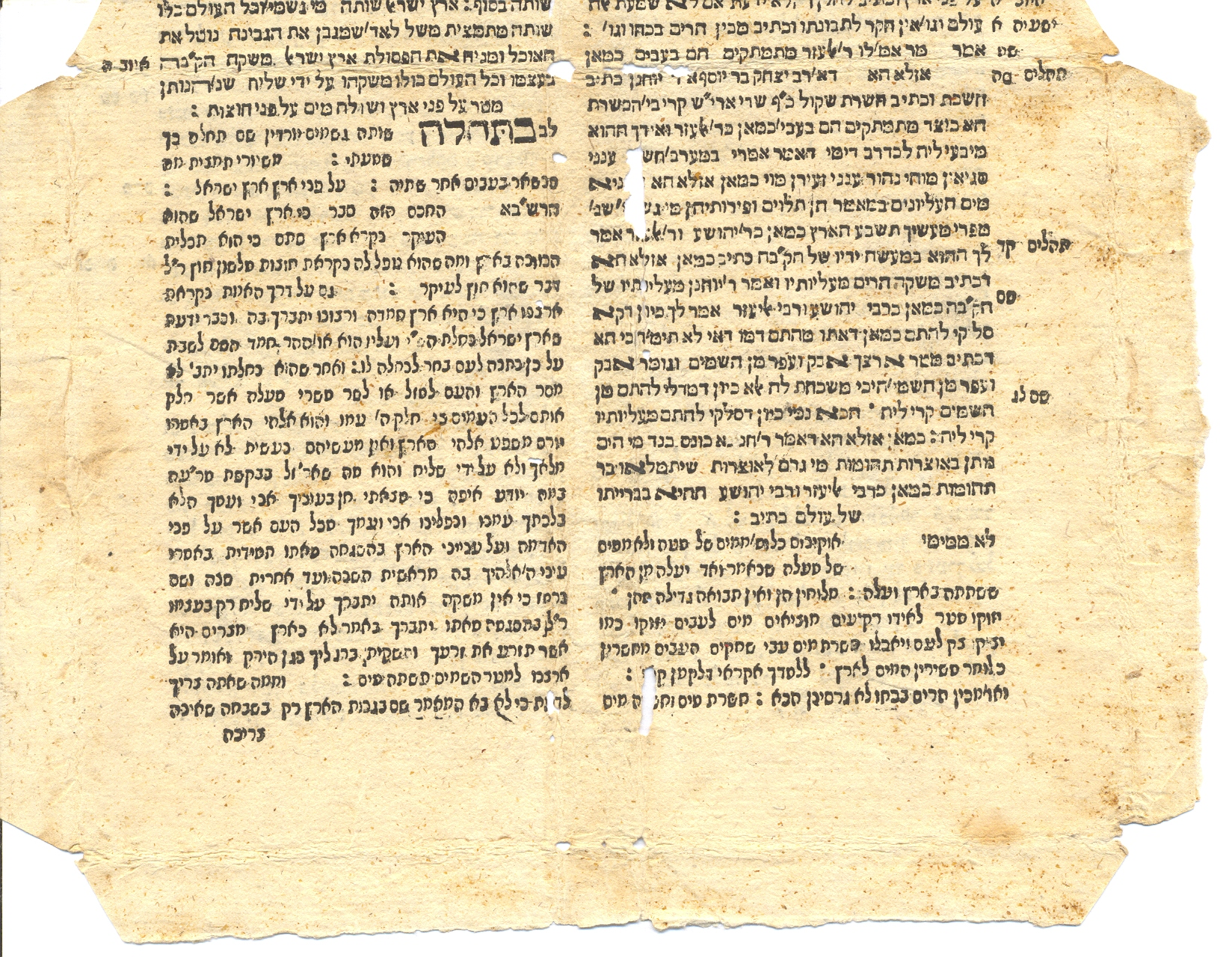
- An early printing of the Talmud (Ta'anit 9b); with commentary by Rashi.
- English name: Trial of the Talmud
- Date: 12 June 1240
- Location: Court of the reigning king of France, Louis IX
- Type: Disputation
- Theme: Four rabbis defended the Talmud against Donin's accusations
- Outcome: Twenty-four carriage loads of Jewish religious manuscripts were set on fire in the streets of Paris

The Disputation of Paris (Hebrew: משפט פריז, romanized: Mishpat Pariz; French: disputation de Paris), also known as the Trial of the Talmud (French: procès du Talmud), took place in 1240 at the court of King Louis IX of France. It followed the work of Nicholas Donin, a Jewish convert to Christianity who translated the Talmud and pressed 35 charges against it to Pope Gregory IX by quoting a series of blasphemous passages about Jesus, Mary, or Christianity. Four rabbis defended the Talmud against Donin's accusations.

== Background ==
Since the times of the Apostles, but with renewed effort in the Lower Middle Ages, the Catholic Church sought to convert Jews to Christianity through debate. Western Christianity in the 13th century had accumulated centuries of experience in Biblical hermeneutics and apologetic techniques, leading Christians to engage with Jews or Muslims in debate in hopes of demonstrating the superiority of their religion.

Strong differences between the two sides of the debate were present: Christianity had developed a detailed theological system, a precise list of authoritative books, and clear teachings grounded in a central authority in Rome. Judaism had a relative absence of dogmatic theology, focusing more on opposing idolatry. Paul Johnson comments: "The Jews had a way of concentrating on life and pushing death—and its dogmas—into the background."

The Catholic Church had shown little interest in the Talmud until 1238, when a Jewish convert, Nicholas Donin, presented 35 charges against it to Pope Gregory IX. Donin claimed that the Talmud contained blasphemous passages about Christianity. The Pope was surprised that Jews relied on texts other than the Torah, and that those other texts contained alleged blasphemies. This lack of interest also characterized the French monarchy which, before 1230, chiefly primarily considered the Jews from the point of view of them being a potential source of income.

== Disputants ==
The debate started on 12 June 1240 at the court of King Louis IX. The Christian side was represented by Nicholas Donin himself, who presented the charges. He had debated the Talmud back when he was a Jew and was censured by the Paris rabbis in 1228 for his views. In addition to accusations of blasphemy, he also selected passages where he claimed suggested that some crimes regulated by French law are not crimes if done by Jews against Christians.

The other Christian members of the tribunal were Queen Blanche, Archbishop Walter Cornutus of Sens, Bishop William of Paris, the inquisitor Henry of Cologne, and the chancellor of the University of Paris. The Jewish side of the debate was represented by rabbis Yechiel of Paris, Moses of Coucy, Judah of Melun, and Samuel ben Solomon of Château-Thierry.

== Trial ==
The terms of the disputation demanded that the four rabbis defend the Talmud against Donin's accusations that it contained attacks on Christians, blasphemies against God and the Christian religion, and obscene folklore. The attacks on Christianity cited passages supposedly referring to Jesus and Mary, such as one in which someone named Yeshu was sent to hell to be boiled in excrement for eternity. Rabbi Yehiel maintained that the Yeshu in the Talmud wasn't the Christian Jesus, stating that "not every Louis born in France is king."

The Talmud was attacked for folklore deemed vulgar or obscene, such as a story in which Adam copulated with all the animals before God created Eve, or one in which Noah was castrated by his son Ham.

According to Israel Yuval, Donin's depiction of the Talmud as justifying or requiring "ritual murder" was based on quotes and interpretations of specific Talmud passages.

Donin cited a Talmudic expression from Shimon bar Yochai, who lived during the Bar Kochba Revolt: "The best of gentiles shall you kill." In context, it referred to the fact that even the best of gentiles joined Pharaoh's troops during the Exodus, so it is forbidden to pity them. Rather than being a general allowance to kill gentiles, the statement applied to foreign soldiers in times of war or the Messianic Age. Some messianic Jews in France believed the Redemption would occur in 1240, the year of the trial, so Donin tied it to a motive of messianic fervor. Based on his interpretation of the Talmud and Jewish messianism, he argued that Jews would literally murder gentiles. Rabbi Yehiel pointed out that this statement referred to pagan Romans during wartime, not Christians, and that Talmudic laws against idolaters, such as a prohibition against trading with them, were not observed regarding Christians. Rabbi Yehiel also reminded those present at the trial of the Ten Commandments' prohibition against killing.

Rabbi Yehiel pointed out that the Talmud used hyperbole so could not be taken so literally.

Twentieth-century Jewish scholar Hyam Maccoby alleges that the purpose of the Paris disputation was to rid the Jews of their "belief in the Talmud", in order that they might return to Old Testament Abrahamism and eventually embrace Christianity. He says that the hostility of the Church during this disputation had less to do with the Church's attitude and more to do with Nicholas Donin. Donin's argumentation exploited controversies that were debated within Judaism at the time, according to Maccoby. Maccoby also suggests that the disputation may have been motivated by Donin's previous affiliations with the Karaite Jews, and that his motivations for joining the Church involved his desire to attack rabbinic tradition.

== Outcome ==
The Disputation set in place a chain of events which culminated in the burning of a great number of Jewish holy texts on 17 June 1242. "One estimate is that the 24 wagonloads included up to 10,000 volumes of Hebrew manuscripts, a startling number when one considers that the printing press did not yet exist, so that all copies of a work had to be written out by hand." The burning of the texts was apparently witnessed by Rabbi Meir of Rothenburg, who wrote a Kinnah about the incident.

Donin's translation of statements taken from the Talmud into French influenced the Christian perception of Jews. Christians had previously viewed Jews as the followers of the Old Testament who honored the Law of Moses and the prophets, but the alleged blasphemies included among the Talmudic texts indicated that Jewish understandings of the Old Testament differed from the Christian one. Louis IX stated that only skilled clerics could conduct a disputation with Jews, but that laymen should plunge a sword into those who speak ill of the Christ.

== Cultural references ==
An account of the Disputation takes place at the start of André Schwarz-Bart's novel The Last of the Just.

== See also ==
- Criticism of Judaism
- Disputation of Barcelona (1263)
- Disputation of Tortosa (1413–1414)
- Jesus in the Talmud
- Toledot Yeshu
- Yonah Gerondi
