= Rudolf Martin (disambiguation) =

Rudolf Martin (born 1967) is a German actor working mainly in the United States. Other people named Rudolf Martin include:

- Martin Brendel (1862–1939), full name Otto Rudolf Martin Brendel, a German astronomer
- Rudolf Martin (anthropologist) (1864–1925), a Swiss anthropologist
- Rudolf Martin Meelführer (1670–1729), a German Hebraist

== See also ==
- Rudolph Martin Anderson (1876–1961), a Canadian zoologist
