= Hyam Maccoby =

British scholar of religion (1924–2004)

Hyam Maccoby (Hebrew: חיים מכובי, 1924–2004) was a Jewish-British scholar and dramatist specialising in the study of the Jewish and Christian religious traditions. He was known for his theories of the historical Jesus and the origins of Christianity.

== Life ==
Maccoby was a Domus Exhibitioner in Classics at Balliol College, Oxford University. During the Second World War he served in the Royal Signals. Maccoby was librarian of Leo Baeck College in London. In retirement he moved to Leeds, where he held an academic position at the Centre for Jewish Studies, University of Leeds.

== Theories of historical Jesus ==
Maccoby considered the portrayal of Jesus given in the canonical gospels and the history of the early Church from the Book of Acts to be heavily distorted and full of later mythical traditions, but he claimed that a fairly accurate historical account of the life of Jesus could still be reconstructed from them.

Maccoby argued that the real Jesus was not a rebel against the Jewish law but instead a Jewish Messianic claimant whose life and teaching were within the mainstream of 1st-century Judaism. He believed that Jesus was executed as a rebel against the Roman occupation of Judaea. However, he did not claim that Jesus was the leader of an actual armed rebellion. Rather, Jesus and his followers, inspired by the Tanakh or Old Testament prophetic writings, were expecting a supernatural divine intervention that would end Roman rule, restore the Davidic Kingdom with Jesus as the divinely anointed monarch and inaugurate the Messianic age of peace and prosperity for the whole world. Those expectations were not fulfilled, and Jesus was arrested and executed by the Romans.

According to Maccoby, Barabbas, from the Aramaic Bar Abba, "Son of the Father", originally referred to Jesus himself, who was called thus from his custom of addressing the Father as Abba, "Father", in his prayers, or else as a form of the rabbinic honorific Berab.

Many of the disciples of Jesus did not lose their hopes; they believed that Jesus would soon be miraculously resurrected by God, and continued to live in expectation of his second coming. Their fellowship continued to exist in Jerusalem as a strictly-orthodox Jewish sect under the leadership of James the Just.

In 2012, Rabbi Shmuley Boteach wrote Kosher Jesus in which he drew on past work by Maccoby.

== Theories on Paul ==
According to Maccoby, the founding of Christianity as a religion separate from Judaism was entirely the work of Paul of Tarsus. In this Maccoby's view is largely based on that of Heinrich Graetz.

Maccoby claimed that Paul was a Hellenized Jewish convert or perhaps even a Gentile, from a background in which he had been exposed to the influence of Gnosticism and the pagan mystery religions, such as the Attis cult, a myth involving a life-death-rebirth deity. The mystery religions, according to Maccoby, were the dominant religious forms in the Hellenistic world of that age and strongly influenced Paul's mythological psychology. Maccoby partially derived his theory from fragments of the writings of opponents of Ebionites, particularly the treatise on Heresies by Epiphanius of Salamis.

Maccoby considered Paul's claims to an orthodox Pharisaic Jewish education to be false and asserted that while many of Paul's writings sound authentic to the uninitiated, they actually betray an ignorance of the original Hebrew scripture and the subtleties of Jewish Law. Maccoby claimed that an examination of the New Testament indicates that Paul knew no Hebrew at all and relied entirely on Greek texts that no actual Pharisee would ever use because they were not properly translated from the Hebrew originals.

According to Maccoby, Paul fused the historical story of Jesus' crucifixion with elements of contemporary mystery religions and Gnosticism and developed such new non-Judaic mythic ideas as the Trinity and the Last Supper. Paul also made an attempt to find prophetic justification for his newly created myth in the Old Testament. Paul came to present Jesus as a dying and rising saviour deity similar to those from the Hellenistic mystery cults, fused with the historical pedigree of Judaism, and thus gave birth to a powerful new myth whose preaching gained him a large following. As the Jerusalem group of the original disciples of Jesus gradually became aware of Paul's teachings, bitter hostility ensued between them.

Maccoby interpreted certain New Testament passages (such as Paul's account of his quarrel with Peter in the Incident at Antioch) as remnants of authentic accounts of that hostility. However, the Jewish Rebellion of 66–70 soon brought a violent end to the Jerusalem sect, and the Gentile Church that was founded by Paul emerged as the winner by default. Maccoby viewed the Book of Acts as a later attempt by the Pauline Church to present the relations between Paul and the Jerusalem disciples as harmonious and the Pauline Church as legitimised by the chain of apostolic succession reaching back to the original disciples of Jesus. Maccoby also conjectured that the Jewish-Christian sect of Ebionites may have been an authentic offshoot of the original Jerusalem community.

=== Criticisms ===
John Gager of Princeton University reviewed The Mythmaker (1986) in the Jewish Quarterly Review (1988), describing part of Maccoby's thesis as "perverse misreading" and concluded "Thus I must conclude that Maccoby's book is not good history, not even history at all." Skarsaune (2002), referencing Maccoby's work and the theory that Paul represents a Christianity totally different from that of the early community in Jerusalem, writes that "Acts provides no evidence to substantiate this theory." James D. G. Dunn (2006) describes Maccoby's revival of Graetz' accusations that Paul was a Gentile as "a regrettable reversion to older polemics". The continuity with Graetz is also noted by Langton (2009), who contrasts Maccoby's approach with adherents of a "building bridges" view, such as Isaac Mayer Wise, Joseph Krauskopf, and Claude Montefiore, even if they shared some details of the polemic critique of Paul.

== The Disputation ==
Maccoby's play The Disputation is a re-enactment of the Disputation of Barcelona, a dramatic confrontation between the Spanish Rabbi Moshe ben Nachman, better known as Nachmanides, and a Spanish convert from Judaism to Christianity, Pablo Christiani, before King James I of Aragon in 1263. Much of the play is drawn from Nachmanides's account of the disputation, and much is inferred from the king's affection for the rabbi and considerable generosity to him after Christiani's formal victory. The play centres on King James, who is portrayed as a complex troubled soul who comes to accept the rabbi's ideas. The play has been widely performed and was broadcast by Channel 4 starring Christopher Lee and Toyah Willcox.

== Bibliography ==
- The Day God Laughed: Sayings, Fables and Entertainments of the Jewish Sages (with Wolf Mankowitz, 1973)
- Revolution in Judea: Jesus and the Jewish Resistance (1973)
- Judaism on Trial: Jewish-Christian Disputations in the Middle Ages (1981)
- The Sacred Executioner: Human Sacrifice and the Legacy of Guilt (1983)
- The Mythmaker: Paul and the Invention of Christianity (1987)
- Early rabbinic writings (1988)
- Judaism in the First Century (1989)
- Paul and Hellenism (1991)
- Judas Iscariot and the Myth of Jewish Evil (1992)
- A Pariah People: Anthropology of Anti-Semitism (1996)
- Ritual and morality: the ritual purity system and its place in Judaism (1999)
- The Philosophy of the Talmud (2002)
- Jesus the Pharisee London, SCM, (2003)
- Maccoby contributed an essay in The Jewish World: Revelation, Prophecy, And History edited by Elie Kedourie (2003)
- Antisemitism and modernity: innovation and continuity (2004)
