= Rudolph Martin Anderson =

Canadian zoologist and explorer (1876–1961)

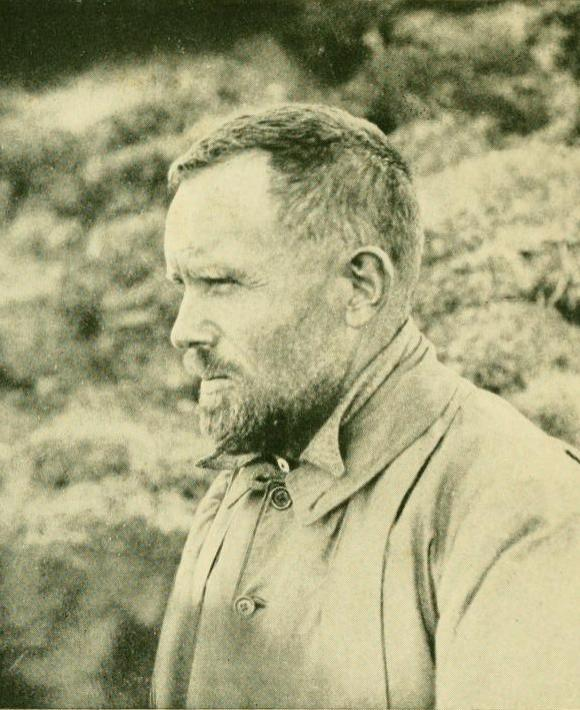

Rudolph Martin Anderson (June 30, 1876 – June 21, 1961) was an American born Canadian zoologist and explorer.

== Early life ==
He was born in Decorah, Iowa in 1876, the son of John E. A. Anderson. He received a Ph.D. from the University of Iowa in 1906; his dissertation was entitled, The birds of Iowa.

== Military service ==
He was a veteran of the Spanish–American War, serving as a corporal in the 52nd Iowa Volunteer Infantry. He served with the 54th Infantry National Guard of Iowa from 1900 to 1906. He was a captain with the National Guard of Missouri from 1906 to 1908.

== Civilian career ==
Anderson participated in the Stefansson-Anderson Arctic Expedition which explored Alaska and the northern Yukon from 1908 to 1912 and was part of the Canadian Arctic Expedition led by Vilhjalmur Stefansson from 1913 to 1916.

Anderson joined the Explorers Club in New York in 1912, but resigned six years later.

He assisted in the development of the Migratory Birds Convention signed by Canada and the United States in 1916. He was chief of the Biology Division of the National Museum of Canada from 1920 to 1946.

== Death and legacy ==
He died in Ottawa in 1961.

== Partial works ==
- (1897). An annotated list of the birds of Winnebago and Hancock counties, Iowa, OCLC 21470231
- (1913–18). Report of the Canadian Arctic Expedition 1913–18, OCLC 65754731
- (1917). Canadian Arctic Expedition. I. Report of Northern division. II. Report of Southern division,, OCLC 11984074
- (1921). John Macoun, 1832 [i.e. 1831]-1920, OCLC 53698027
- (1932). Methods of collecting and preserving vertebrate animals, OCLC 3174231
- (1934). Mammals of the eastern Arctic and Hudson Bay; Arctic flora, OCLC 1181152
- (1937). Mammals and birds of the western Arctic district, Northwest Territories, Canada, OCLC 27841943
- (1937). Faunas of Canada, OCLC 23859629
- (1943). A synopsis of the rodents of the southern parts of the prairie provinces of Canada, OCLC 83221430

== Honors ==
- Spanish–American War Medal
- Expert Rifleman with bars
- King George VI Coronation medal
- Knight Officer International Order, St. Hubert, 1951

== See also ==
- Rudolf Martin (disambiguation)

== Archives ==
There is a Rudolph Martin Anderson fonds at Library and Archives Canada. Archival reference number is R6390.
