= Disputation of Tortosa =

Disputation between Christians and Jews in the Middle Ages

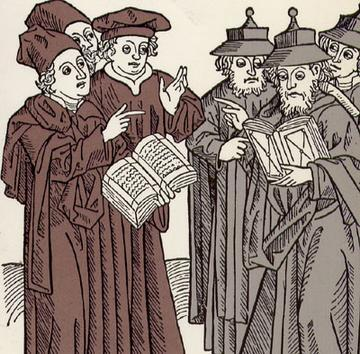
Disputation between Christian and Jewish scholars. Johann von Armssheim, 1483. Woodcut

The Disputation of Tortosa was one of the famous ordered disputations between Christians and Jews of the Middle Ages, a series of sixty nine sessions held in the years 1413–1414 in the city of Tortosa, Principality of Catalonia (Crown of Aragon, part of modern-day Spain). The disputation of Tortosa was not a free and authentic debate, but rather a coercive, one-sided theological showdown designed to force the conversion of Jewish leaders and the Jewish population.

Among the participants on the Jewish side were Profiat Duran and Yosef Albo as well as other rabbinic scholars such as Moshe ben Abbas, and Astruc ha-Levi. Each one was a representative of a different community. Vincent Ferrer, later canonised, was an important participant on the Christian side. As a followup of the disputations, in May 1415, a papal bull forbade the study of the Talmud.

== Background ==
The initiator of the disputation and representative for the Christians was the antipope's personal physician, the Jewish Christian convert Gerónimo de Santa Fe. After his conversion to Christianity, he presented Antipope Benedict XIII with a composition containing topics to contest with his former co-religionists. The aging antipope, who rejoiced at religious debate, jumped at the opportunity to bring the Jews to a disputation. King Ferdinand I of Aragon did not stand in his way, and letters of invitation were sent to the various Jewish communities in 1413. Attempts by the Jews to free themselves of this were not successful.

The Jewish representatives were at a considerable disadvantage—whereas Nahmanides at the Disputation of Barcelona and the Jewish representatives at the Disputation of Paris had been granted immunity, "every Jewish attempt to respond to the Christian charges was met with the threat of the accusation of heresy". The disputation was not a free discussion between two parties but took the form of a propaganda attack by the Christian side against Jews, including the use of psychological pressure in the form of intimidation and threats.

== Proceedings ==
=== Beginnings ===
At the start of the disputation on February 7, 1413, Geronimo presented the debate's principal points and the prohibition incumbent on the Jews from making any difficulties for Christianity over its course. By his words, since the Jewish faith is close to the Christian faith and since the Pope considers the Jews "lost lambs", he is eager to return them to God more than he is eager to do so with the believers in Islam. The main speaker among the Jewish sages was chosen by turn each day. They were placed under great stress, and at times when they returned to the residence allotted to them arguments erupted over the answers they had provided. Their opponent was always granted the last word.

Geronimo emphasized the Midrashic passages according to which the Messiah had already come. These include the passage which identifies the birthday of the Messiah as the day of the destruction of the Second Temple and the statement in the Talmud that the world will last 6000 years, of which the last two thousand would be the Messianic Age. He also used the midrash of the Pesikta which says that the Messiah will suffer.

The Jews responded via a commentary to the midrashim that relied on both the surface (peshat) and comparative meaning (drash) to remove the messianic sting. They also repeated the statement of Nahmanides in his own disputation that he is not obligated to believe in Aggadah, which led Geronimo to depict them as heretics by their own religion. The Jews also pointed out that, in any case, belief in the Messiah is not the mainstay of Judaism. This point was to appear in an explicit and expanded form in the Sefer ha-Ikkarim ("Book of Fundamental Principles"), which Yosef Albo wrote following the disputation.

Geronimo also utilized the midrashim published by Ramon Martí in his book Pugio Fidei. The Jews claimed these to be fraudulent forgeries and demanded that the original Jewish manuscript in which the midrashim appear be brought before them, but the demand was not granted. The question of whether the midrashim offered by Martí were indeed forgeries has been a controversial one among scholars.

After two weeks of discussion, the head of the Dominican Order summed up, saying that the victory of the Christians is clear and that it was proven with certainty by the Jews' own midrashim that the Messiah has already come. There were thus two possibilities: either the Jewish representatives did not have all their say, or that they are without answer. The Pope summed up and said that, since the Jews change their words from one moment to another, it would be better to hold the disputation in writing. Thus the disputation continued by way of readings of written memoranda through the months of March and April.

The Jews requested a free debate, but they were told that they are not at a debate but at a gathering for indoctrination and inculcation. When they said that a teacher should consider the wishes of the student, they were told that there is no interest in indoctrinating them, only the Jewish masses. As a way of undervaluing themselves, the sages said that mistakes and errors might befall them, but the Law of Moses is forever.

Geronimo insisted on using again and again the midrashim from the Dagger of Faith and to abstain when asked to show the manuscript in which they appear.

=== Second phase ===
From May onward the discussion focused on the things the Messiah is supposed to accomplish. The Jews claimed that he is to take the Nation of Israel out of the diaspora and to rebuild the Temple in Jerusalem - things Jesus did not do. The Jews' main points were: the Diaspora still exists, even Christianity has not spread everywhere, the nations fight one another, there is no world peace, and people continue to sin. In any case, the Redemption of Israel must be the redemption of the Jews, and that has certainly not occurred. The gentiles cannot be called "Israel" (as opposed to the Church's position).

The Christians forcefully argued that in the midrashim themselves it may be seen that the redemption brought by the Messiah is spiritual, that is, it is atonement for Man and the extrication of the souls from Hell. The Jews responded that for the redemption of souls there is no need for a messiah: observers of mitzvot in every generation achieve salvation in the afterlife without a messiah.

A topic discussed in the disputation is the future abolition of the sacrifices. Geronimo claimed, using among other sources the famous pronouncement of Maimonides, that sacrifices are a psychological substitute for paganism and that sacrifices will eventually be abolished. The Jews maintained that sacrifices will persist in the Messianic Age, and that besides the rational explanations for them there are also mystical ones.

The Jewish religious leaders fiercely rejected the claim that their refusal to accept the religion of Jesus is the reason for the lengthening of the Exile, for if they had accepted the Islamic religion and turned to such nations as the Ottomans, they would also have been freed from bondage.

=== Third phase ===
Between August and November there was a recess in the discussions, and a new series of meetings opened in actuality only on January 8, 1414. Only three of the Jewish leaders agreed to continue. Rabbi Yosef Albo asked to return home, yet in the end remained in the city.

The Jews declared that the Christians were making strange use of the midrashim. Even by their reasoning, according to which the midrashim indicate that the Messiah has already come, they certainly do not indicate that he came in the time of Jesus. If so, how can they be used to prove the truthfulness of Christianity?

The Christians responded that they indeed are not obligated to believe in the midrashim, but the Jews, who do believe in them, must conclude from them that the Messiah was already born. The Jews again explained why they thought there was no logic in this claim.

As the discussions on the doctrine of the Messiah continued, Astruc HaLevi emphasized that the word "messiah" in its Jewish and Christian meanings is completely different. Thus, he said, there is no difference of opinion between Jews and Christians over the question of his coming, rather the debate is over what a messiah really is. Afterwards, he nullified the significance of the debate. A failure in the debate cannot prove the failure of the faith, but only the inabilities of the arguer. The Jewish religious leaders are far from their homes and are losing their properties because of this, and their families are being harmed. Their situation is so degraded that no great wisdom is needed to debate them in these conditions.

Geronimo responded that their scared and frightened demeanors in themselves prove that their belief is not true, for on the true faith it is said in the Bible: "I will also speak of Thy testimonies before kings, and will not be ashamed" (Ps. 119:46). The disputation over faith is necessary, and the Jewish leaders must give an accounting for the Torah, which they teach.

Zerachia HaLevi then emphasized that the belief in the Messiah is a principle of faith by which the midrashim must be interpreted. Thus he rejected the attempt to produce arguments against the principle of the Messiah from the midrash, for the interpretation must use the principle of faith to elucidate the midrash, not the reverse.

In April, Geronimo summarized the disputation according to his own understanding, and thus ended the exchange over the matter of the Messiah.

== Debate over the Talmud ==
Discussion turned to a new topic, around which revolved the earlier Disputation of Paris of 1240: "the errors, heresies, defilements, and blasphemies against the Christian religion" found in the Talmud. At this point, the Jews apparently decided that it is better for them to keep quiet, and said that although they are convinced that the sages of the Talmud would know how to defend their words, they do not know how to do so. Yosef Albo and Zerachia HaLevi did not participate in this communication and agreed to respond, but their responses are not known.

Geronimo demanded to burn the Talmud. He used the dispute over the works of Maimonides, which ended with the burning of his books, to justify burning a book even if only a small part of it is heretical.

It seems that most of the Jewish religious leaders reached the conclusion that a continuation of the disputation would exact a heavy cost and that the harm brought in their absence upon their communities and families was intolerable, so they decided to end it at all costs. It is not known what those among them who decided to continue said in the remainder, and in December 1414 the disputation was formally concluded.

== Results ==
Benedict claimed victory and he gave instructions by which all books of the Talmud would be handed over to his functionaries for censorship. Compulsory conversions of the Jews continued, although they were not given official encouragement. However, Jews who were coerced into becoming Christian could, if they wished, return to their own religion. Vincent Ferrer passed through the communities and compelled the Jews to hear his sermons, then took his campaign north to France in 1416; that year a new king, Alfonso V, took to the throne in Aragon, and subsequently reversed all the anti-Jewish legislation of the Ferrer epoch, protecting the Jews and conversos firmly from the start of his reign and rejecting all attacks on them.

Most of the damage caused as a result of the disputation was to morale. Aragon Jewry suffered a hard blow and many of its dignitaries and wealthy converted. The feeling was that the Jews had gotten the worst of it in the confrontation with Geronimo. After the fact, Isaac Abrabanel criticized the weakness of the arguments brought forward by the Jewish religious leaders, but it appears that under their duress, their ability to succeed was more limited.

== See also ==
- Disputation of Barcelona (1263)
- Disputation of Paris (1240)
- History of the Jews in Spain
- Converso
- Marrano
- Allahdad
- 1910 Shiraz blood libel
- Christianity and Judaism
