= Astruc ha-Levi =

Spanish Jewish Talmudic scholar

Astruc ha-Levi of Daroca (lived in Spain at the end of the fourteenth and at the beginning of the fifteenth century) was a Spanish Jewish Talmudic scholar and member of the Astruc family.

He was a delegate to the famous disputation of Tortosa, in 1413, under the presidency of Antipope Benedict XIII, at which he displayed energy and breadth of mind. Attacks having been made on the Talmud, based on some extravagant haggadic sentences, Astruc handed to the assembly a written declaration, in which he denied any authority to the Haggadah, and utterly renounced it.

On another occasion, Astruc dared the anger of the pope. Having pointed out the improbability of the haggadic legend that the Messiah was born on the day of the destruction of the Temple and was now in paradise, Astruc said: "Lord and Pope, you believe so many improbabilities about your Messiah, let us believe this single one regarding ours."
