= Jacob Zallel Lauterbach =

American Judaica scholar and author (1873–1942)

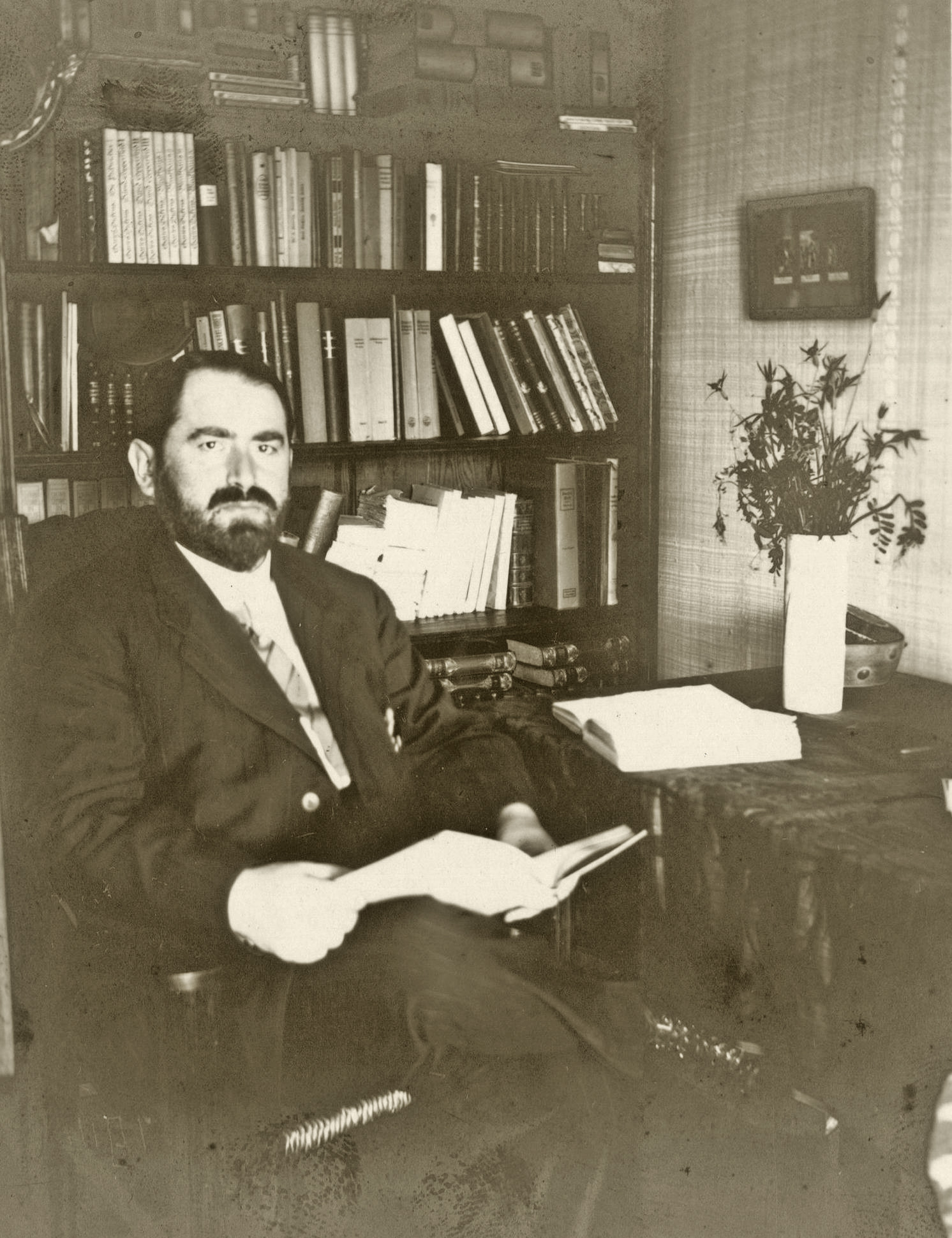
- Born: 1873
- Died: 1942 (aged 68–69)
- Occupations: Judaica scholar; author; professor
- Known for: Critical edition and translation of the Mekilta de-Rabbi Ishmael

Jacob Zallel Lauterbach (1873–1942) was an American Judaica scholar and author who served on the faculty of Hebrew Union College and composed responsa for the Reform movement in America. He specialized in Midrashic and Talmudical literature, and is best known for his landmark critical edition and English translation of the Mekilta de-Rabbi Ishmael.

== Life and work ==
Jacob Z. Lauterbach was first and foremost a talmudist. However, he was thoroughly familiar with all the modern techniques of critical scholarship, including manuscript comparison and decryption. After retiring from his position at Hebrew Union College, he continued to live at the College and to mentor students.

He was the author of several books besides the three-volume Mekilta, and was a prolific contributor to the Jewish Encyclopedia, for which he authored or co-authored 260 articles, which are listed in Rothman (1951) and online at the Jewish Encyclopedia's page for the contributions of J.Z. Lauterbach. He additionally contributed 17 articles to the Hebrew Otzar Yisrael encyclopedia of Julius Eisenstein.

Among his scholarly publications may be listed the following.

- "The Talmud and Reform Judaism" (1911), American Israelite 58(18):p. 1.
- "The attitude of the Jew towards the non-Jew" (1921), C.C.A.R. Yearbook 31:186–233.
- "A significant controversy between the Sadducees and the Pharisees" (1927), HUCA 4:173–205.
- "Is it permissible to let a non-Jewish contractor, building a synagogue, work on the building on the Sabbath?" [A responsum] (1927), C.C.A.R. Yearbook 37:202–206.
- "Should one cover the head when participating in divine worship?" [A responsum] (1928), C.C.A.R. Yearbook 38:589–603.
- "Talmudic-rabbinic view on birth control" [A responsum] (1927), C.C.A.R. Yearbook 37:369–384.
- Mekilta de-Rabbi Ishmael: A Critical Edition on the Basis of the Manuscripts and Early Editions with an English Translation, Introduction, and Notes (1933)
