= Rudolf Martin Meelführer =

German Hebraist (1670–1729)

Rudolf Martin Meelführer (1670–1729) was a German Hebraist. He was a student of Wagenseil at the University of Altdorf, and followed his teacher in study of the depiction of Christianity in the Talmud. He taught at Altdorf and then was adjunct in philosophy at Wittenberg.

His 1699 dissertation Jesus in Talmude (“Jesus in the Talmud”) was the first study fully devoted to the subject.

== Works ==
- Consensus veterum Hebraeorum cum ecclesia Christiana ex vetustissimis eorum 1701
