= Disputation of Barcelona =

Medieval Jewish-Christian debate

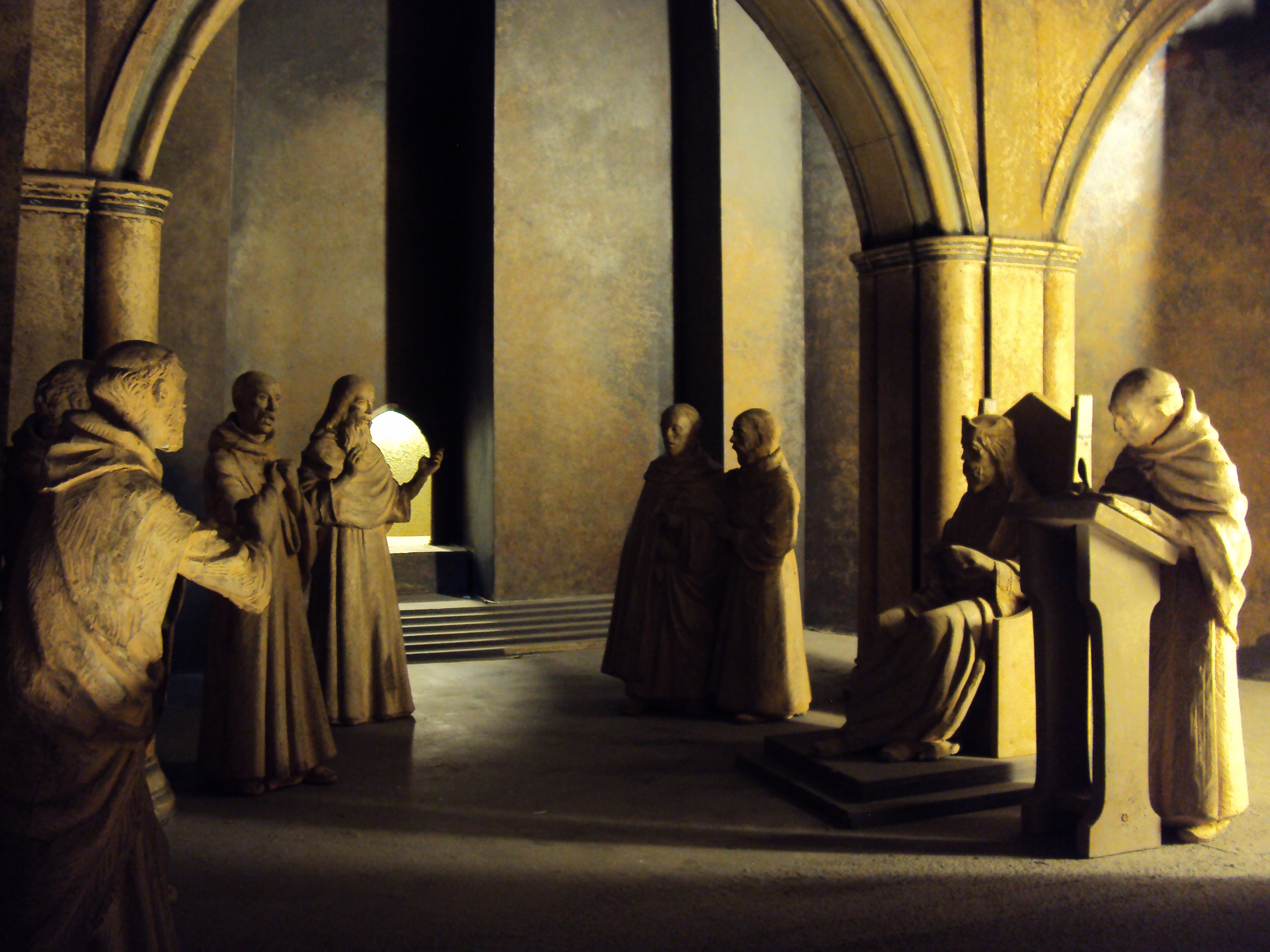
Representation of the Disputation of Barcelona, Anu – Museum of the Jewish People

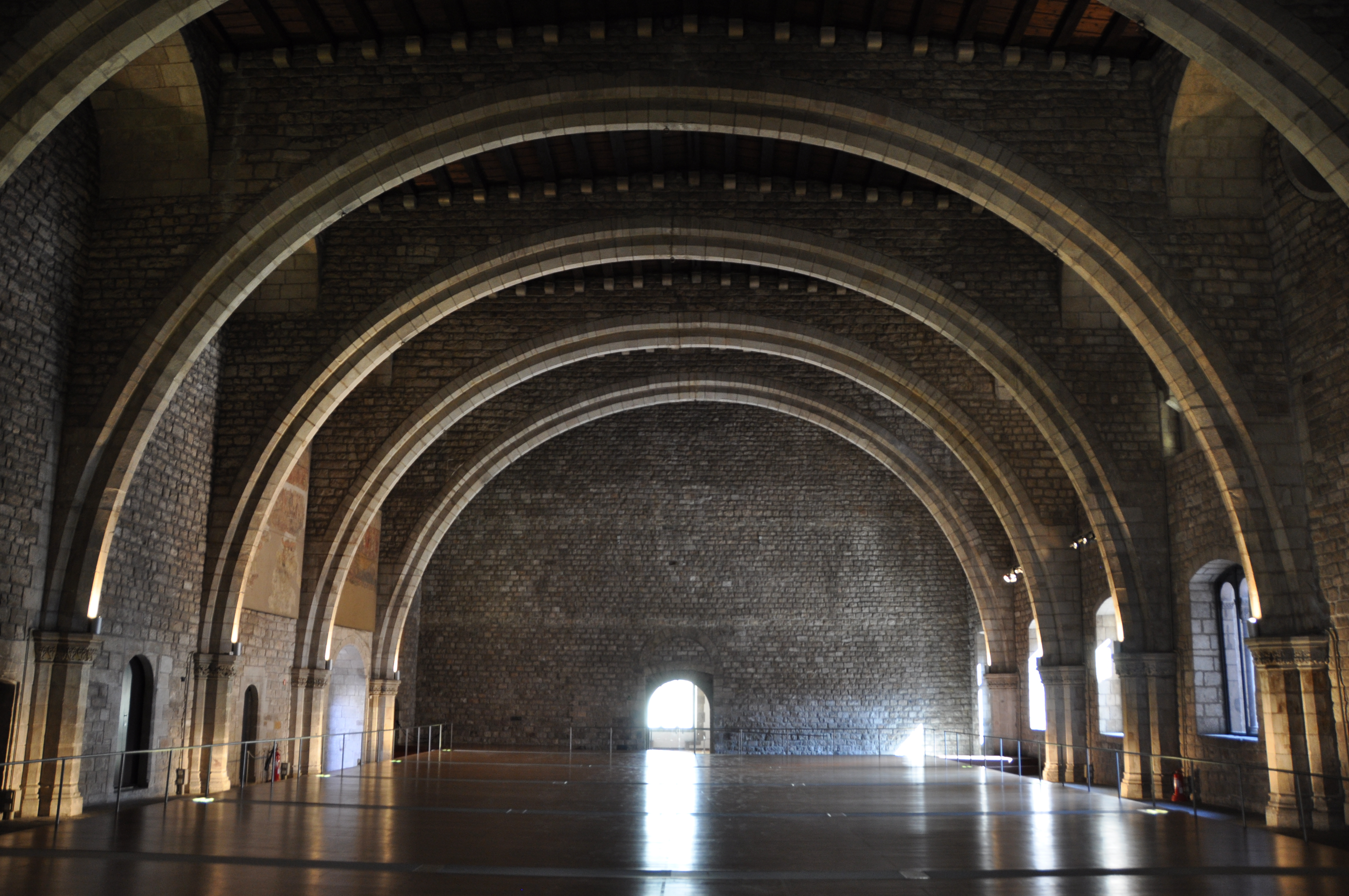
Saló del Tinell (Tinel Hall), Palau Reial Major, where the disputation took place

The Disputation of Barcelona (July 20–24, 1263) was a formal ordered medieval disputation between representatives of Christianity and Judaism regarding whether Jesus was the Jewish Messiah. It was held at the royal palace of King James I of Aragon in the presence of the King, his court, and many prominent ecclesiastical dignitaries and knights between Dominican Friar Pablo Christiani, a convert from Judaism to Christianity, and Nachmanides, a leading medieval Jewish scholar, philosopher, physician, kabbalist, and biblical commentator.

During the Middle Ages, there were numerous ordered disputations between Christians and Jews. They were connected with burnings of the Talmud, burnings of Jews at the stake, and anti-Jewish pogroms. In Barcelona, Jews and Christians were given absolute freedom to deliver their arguments however they wanted—a freedom not then otherwise available to Jews anywhere else.

== Overture ==
The ordered disputation was organized by Raymond de Penyafort, the superior of the Christians and the confessor of James I. Christiani had been preaching to the Jews of Provence. Christiani assured the King that he could prove the truth of Christianity from the Talmud and other rabbinical writings. Nachmanides complied with the order of the King, but stipulated that complete freedom of speech should be granted.

The disputation took place in front of the royal court of King James of Aragon (1263), who guaranteed and asserted freedom of speech for the Jewish spokesperson Nachmanides. This led to a genuine confrontation between Christianity and Judaism in which the true fundamental differences between the two religions could be brought to light.

== Proceedings ==
The debate turned on the following questions:

1. whether the Messiah had appeared or not
2. whether, according to Scripture, the Messiah is a divine or a human being
3. whether the Jews or the Christians held the true faith.

=== Had the Messiah appeared ===
Based upon several aggadic passages, Christiani argued that Pharisaic sages believed that the Messiah had lived during the Talmudic period, and that they must therefore have believed that the Messiah was Jesus.

Nachmanides countered that Christiani's interpretations of Talmudic passages were per-se distortions; the rabbis would not hint that Jesus was the Messiah while, at the same time, explicitly opposing him as such:

"Does he mean to say that the sages of the Talmud believed in Jesus as the messiah and believed that he is both human and divine, as held by the Christians? However, it is well known that the incident of Jesus took place during the period of the Second Temple. He was born and killed prior to the destruction of the Temple, while the sages of the Talmud, like R. Akiba and his associates, followed this destruction. Those who compiled the Mishnah, Rabbi and R. Nathan, lived many years after the destruction. All the more so R. Ashi who compiled the Talmud, who lived about four hundred years after the destruction. If these sages believed that Jesus was the messiah and that his faith and religion were true and if they wrote these things from which Friar Paul intends to prove this, then how did they remain in the Jewish faith and in their former practice? For they were Jews, remained in the Jewish faith all their lives, and died Jews - they and their children and their students who heard their teachings. Why did they not convert and turn to the faith of Jesus, as Friar Paul did? ... If these sages believed in Jesus and in his faith, how is it that they did not do as Friar Paul, who understands their teachings better than they themselves do?"

Nachmanides noted that prophetic promises of the Messianic Age, a reign of universal peace and justice had not yet been fulfilled. Nachmanides also argued that since the appearance of Jesus of Nazareth, the world had still been filled with violence and injustice, and among all religions, he claimed that the Christians were the most warlike. He asserted that questions of the Messiah are of less dogmatic importance to Jews than most Christians imagine, because it is more meritorious for the Jews to observe the precepts of the Torah under a Christian ruler, while in exile and suffering humiliation and abuse, than under the rule of the Messiah, when every one would perforce act in accordance with the Law.

=== Is the Messiah a divine or a human being ===
Nachmanides demonstrated from numerous biblical and Talmudic sources that traditional (rabbinic) Jewish belief ran contrary to Christianity’s postulates, and showed that the Biblical prophets regarded the future messiah as a human, a person of flesh and blood, without ascribing him divine attributes.

"[... it seems most strange that... ] the Creator of Heaven and Earth resorted to the womb of a certain Jewish lady, grew there for nine months and was born as an infant, and afterwards grew up and was betrayed into the hands of his enemies who sentenced him to death and executed him, and that afterwards... he came to life and returned to his original place. The mind of a Jew, or any other person, simply cannot tolerate these assertions. If you have listened all your life to the priests who have filled your brain and the marrow of your bones with this doctrine, and it has settled into you because of that accustomed habit. [I would argue that if you were hearing these ideas for the first time, now, as a grown adult], you would never have accepted them."

According to a report by Nachmanides,

Friar Paul claimed: "Behold the passage in Isaiah, chapter 53, tells of the death of the messiah and how he was to fall into the hands of his enemies and how he was placed alongside the wicked, as happened to Jesus. Do you believe that this section speaks of the messiah?

I said to him: "In terms of the true meaning of the section, it speaks only of the people of Israel, which the prophets regularly call 'Israel My servant' or 'Jacob My servant.'"

=== Conclusion ===
The Jewish residents of Barcelona, fearing the resentment of the Dominicans, entreated him to discontinue; but the King, whom Nachmanides had acquainted with the apprehensions of the Jews, desired him to proceed. At the end of the disputation, James I awarded Nachmanides a prize of 300 gold coins and declared that never before had he heard "an unjust cause so nobly defended." On the Shabbat after the debate, the king also attended the Sinagoga Major de Barcelona, arguably one of the oldest synagogues in Europe, and addressed the Jewish congregants there, "a thing unheard of during the Middle Ages".

== Aftermath ==
Since the Dominicans claimed victory, Nachmanides published a transcript of the entire proceedings, including some dialogue that took place privately between himself and the king. As a result of the publication, under pressure from the Dominicans, James I forced Nachmanides to leave Aragon and never return. In 1267, he settled in the Land of Israel. There he founded a synagogue in the Old City of Jerusalem, the Ramban Synagogue. It is the second-oldest synagogue that is still active in Jerusalem.

In August 1263, James I ordered the removal of passages deemed offensive from the Talmud. The committee assigned to carry out the censorship consisted of Bishop of Barcelona Arnau de Gurb, Raymond de Penyafort, and the Dominicans Arnoldo de Legarra, Pedro de Janua and Ramón Martí (author of Pugio Fidei).

The event was the inspiration for Hyam Maccoby's play The Disputation. It was dramatised for television in 1986 by Channel 4 and starred Christopher Lee as James I, Bob Peck as Pablo Christiani and Alan Dobie as Nachmanides.

== See also ==
- Disputation of Paris (1240)
- Disputation of Tortosa (1413–1414)
- Converso
- Marrano
