= Ancient synagogue (Barcelona) =

Ancient synagogue in Barcelona, Spain

Ancient Synagogue of Barcelona
- Catalan: Sinagoga Major de Barcelona; Spanish: Sinagoga Mayor de Barcelona
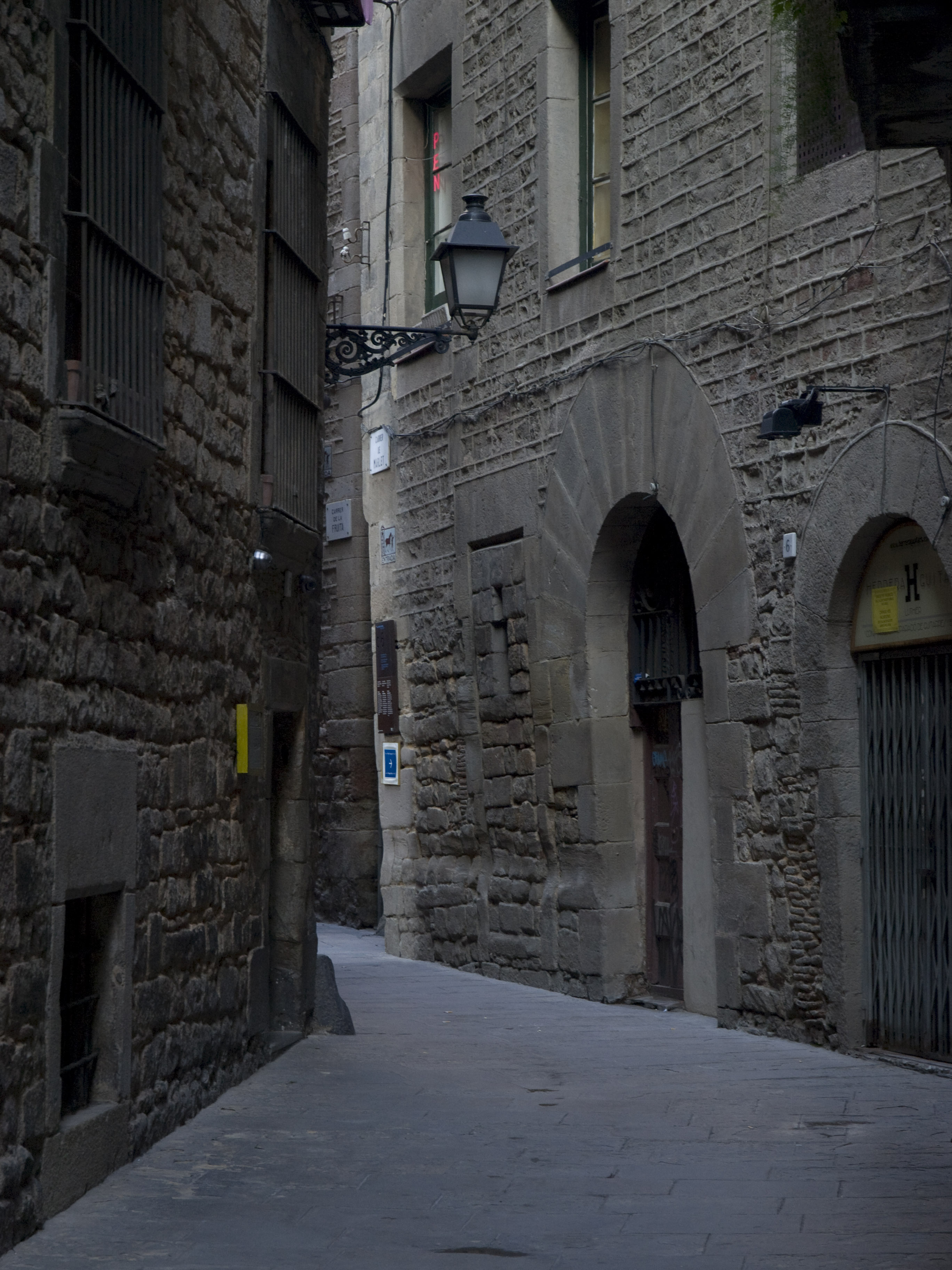
- Carrer Marlet, in the old Jewish quarter of Barcelona. The Sinagoga Major is on the left.

- Location of the synagogue in Barcelona

Religion
- Affiliation: Judaism
- Rite: Nusach Sefard
- Ecclesiastical or organizational status: Synagogue (3rd–14th centuries); Profane use (15th–20th centuries); Synagogue (since 2002); Jewish museum (since 2002)
- Status: Active (by arrangement)

Location
- Location: Jewish quarter, Barcelona, Catalonia
- Country: Spain
- Interactive map of Ancient Synagogue of Barcelona
- Coordinates: 41°22′57″N 2°10′33″E

Architecture
- Type: Synagogue architecture
- Completed: 3rd or 4th century; 2002 (restoration)

Specifications
- Direction of façade: East
- Materials: Stone

Website
- sinagogamayor.com

The Ancient Synagogue of Barcelona (Catalan: Sinagoga Major de Barcelona; Spanish: Sinagoga Mayor de Barcelona) is believed to be an ancient Jewish synagogue located in the Jewish quarter of Barcelona, Catalonia, Spain. Dating to as early as the 3rd century, the synagogue has been described as the oldest in Spain and one of the oldest synagogues in Europe. After many centuries of use for other purposes, the building re-opened as a synagogue and Jewish museum in 2002. No congregation prays regularly at the Ancient Synagogue, however it is used for festive occasions, such as B'nei Mitzvah and weddings.

== History ==
Archaeological investigations show that the original structure of the building was built in the third or fourth century; whether this structure was the synagogue cannot be said with certainty. The building was significantly expanded during the 13th century. Medieval Barcelona is known to have had several synagogues, and the main synagogue was certainly in the immediate area. (Note: Other sources say fifth or sixth century.) King James I visited the synagogue in 1263 at the conclusion of the Barcelona Disputation. Shlomo ben Aderet, leader of Spanish Jewry of his time, served as the rabbi of the Sinagoga Major for 50 years during the late 13th century.

The Jews of Barcelona were massacred in 1391. The building was then used for many purposes and its original use was forgotten. Over the centuries, additional stories were added to the building.

=== Restoration ===
In 1987, Jaume Riera y Sans began researching the location of the Sinagoga Major. His research was based on a reconstruction of the route followed by a thirteenth-century tax collector that ended at the Sinagoga Major. Riera's work led Miguel Iaffa to examine the exterior of the building. Iaffa noted that the structure had been built in compliance with religious requirements that the building should face Jerusalem and that it should have two windows. In fact, the eastward orientation of the building (toward Jerusalem) broke with the northwest/southeast alignment of the streets in its neighborhood. Iaffa purchased the building in 1995 when its owner put it up for sale. The Call Association of Barcelona (Catalan: Associació Call de Barcelona), (Note: The Catalan word call refers to the Jewish quarter of a city.) led by Iaffa, undertook the recovery and restoration of the synagogue.

=== 21st century ===
The Sinagoga Major was opened to the public in 2002, and it drew 20,000 visitors during 2005.

In 2003, two Canadians became the first couple to be married at the Sinagoga Major in more than 600 years. A New York attorney donated a 500-year-old sefer Torah (Torah scroll) to the synagogue in 2006.

In January 2009, a right-wing extremist affiliated with the Republican Social Movement attacked the Sinagoga Major. He struck the building's facade repeatedly with a baseball bat, and when a synagogue employee approached him, he beat the worker so severely with the bat the man had to be hospitalized with cerebral contusions and a broken arm. The attacker was detained by police.

== Gallery ==
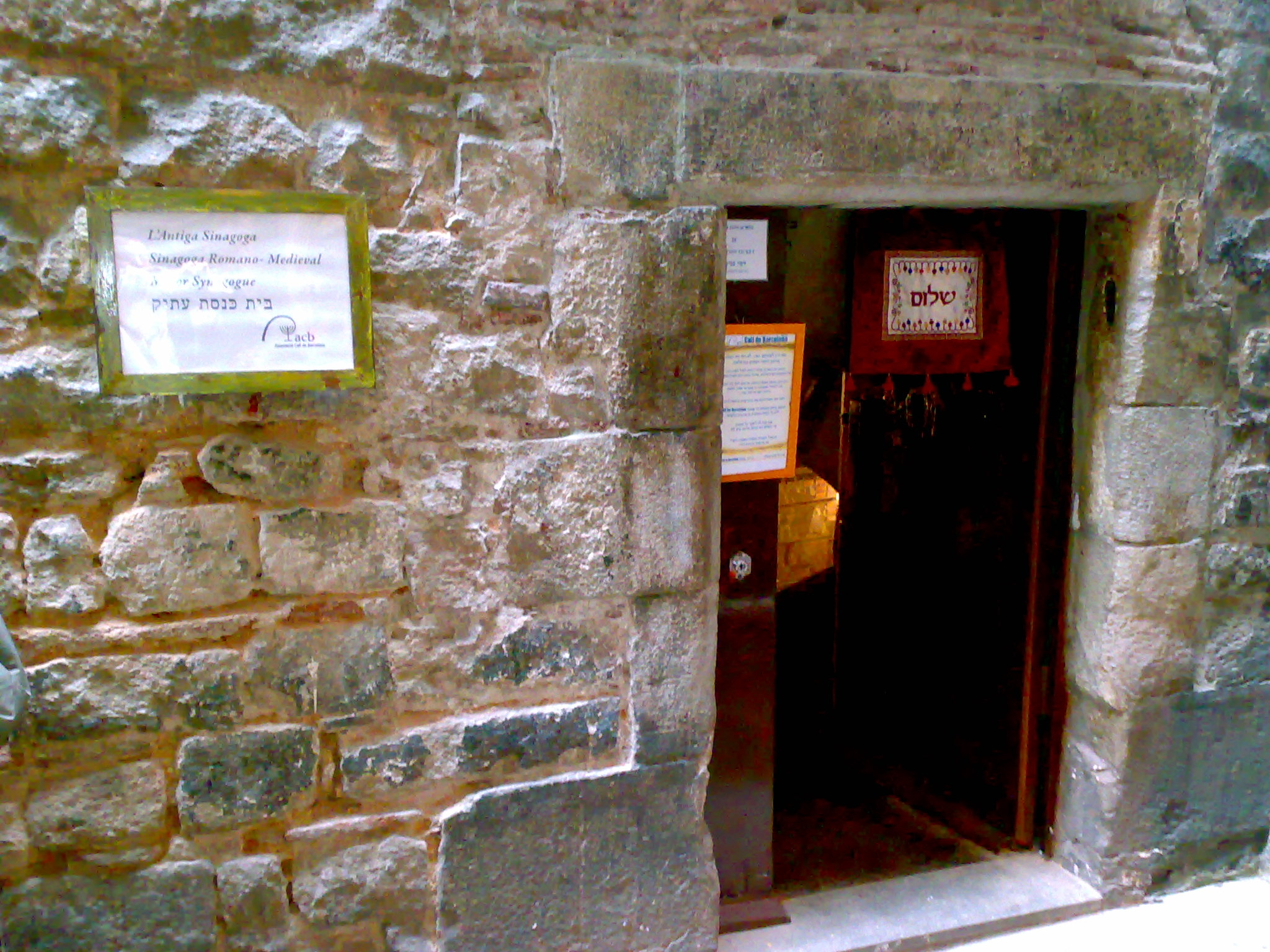
Entrance to the Associació Call de Barcelona

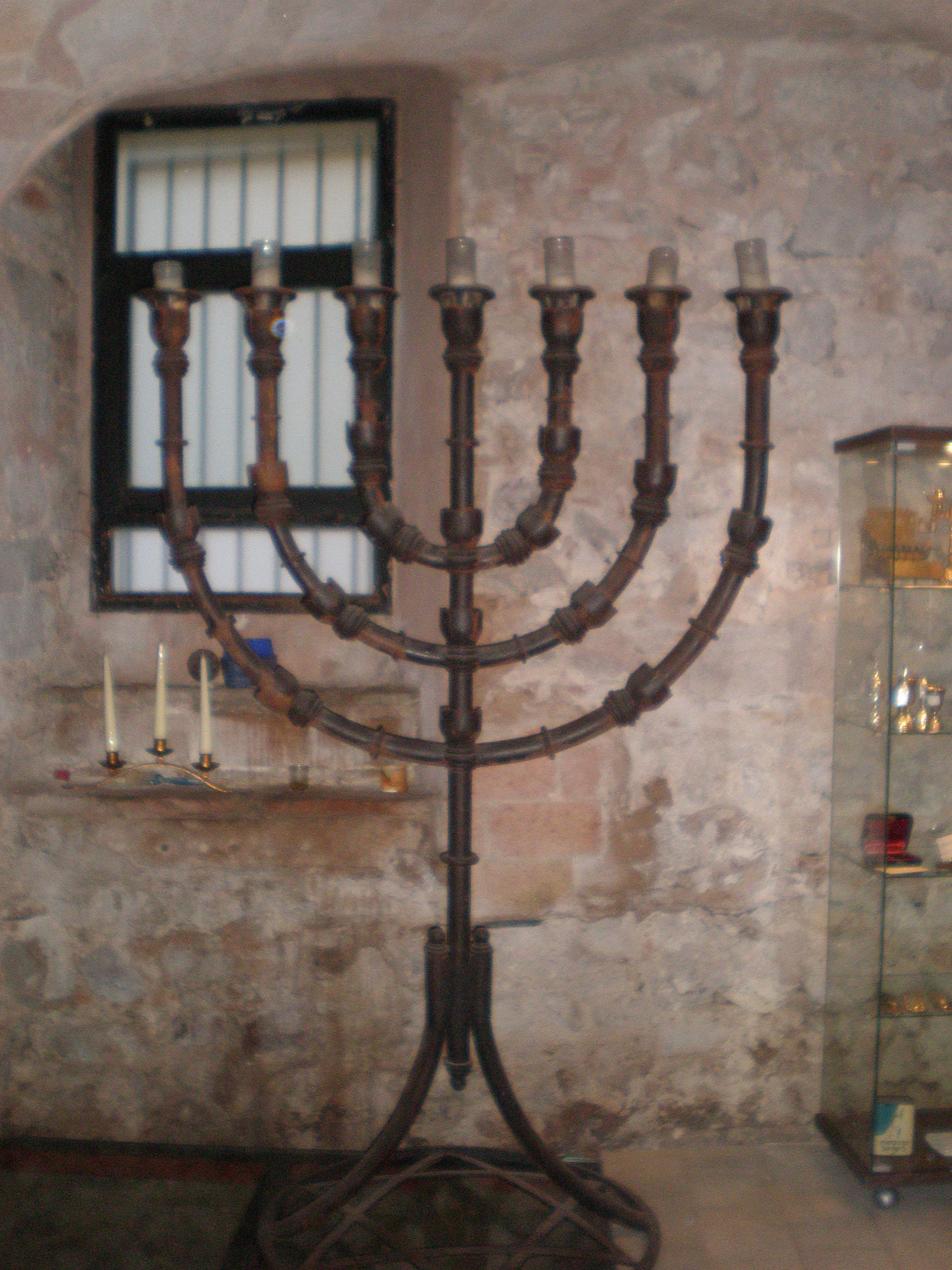
A menorah seen inside the synagogue

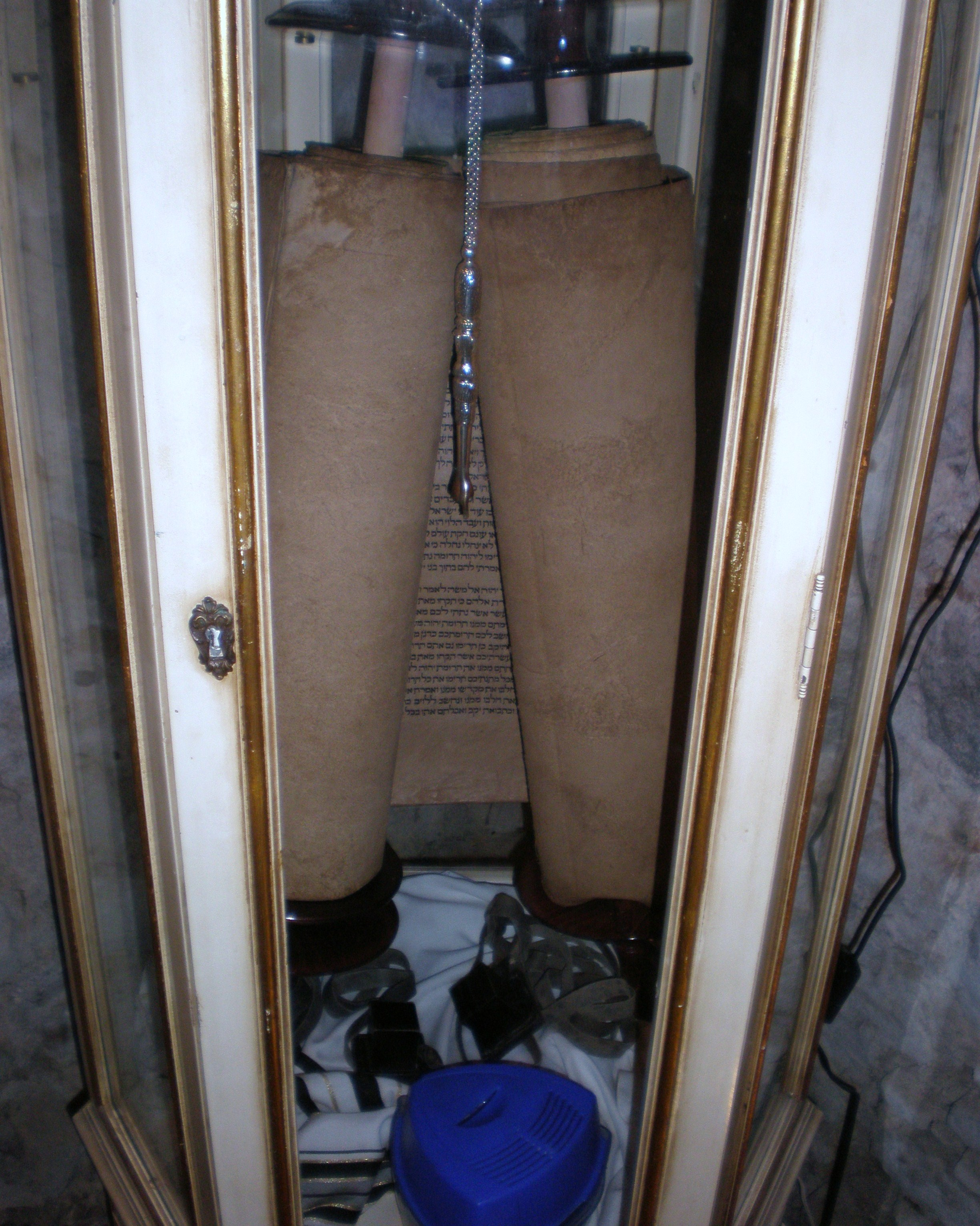
The sefer Torah (Torah scroll) seen inside the synagogue

== See also ==
- History of the Jews in Catalonia
- List of synagogues in Spain
- Oldest synagogues in the world
