= Jewish quarter (Barcelona) =

Historic Jewish neighborhood in Barcelona

Coordinates: 41°22′56″N 02°10′37″E

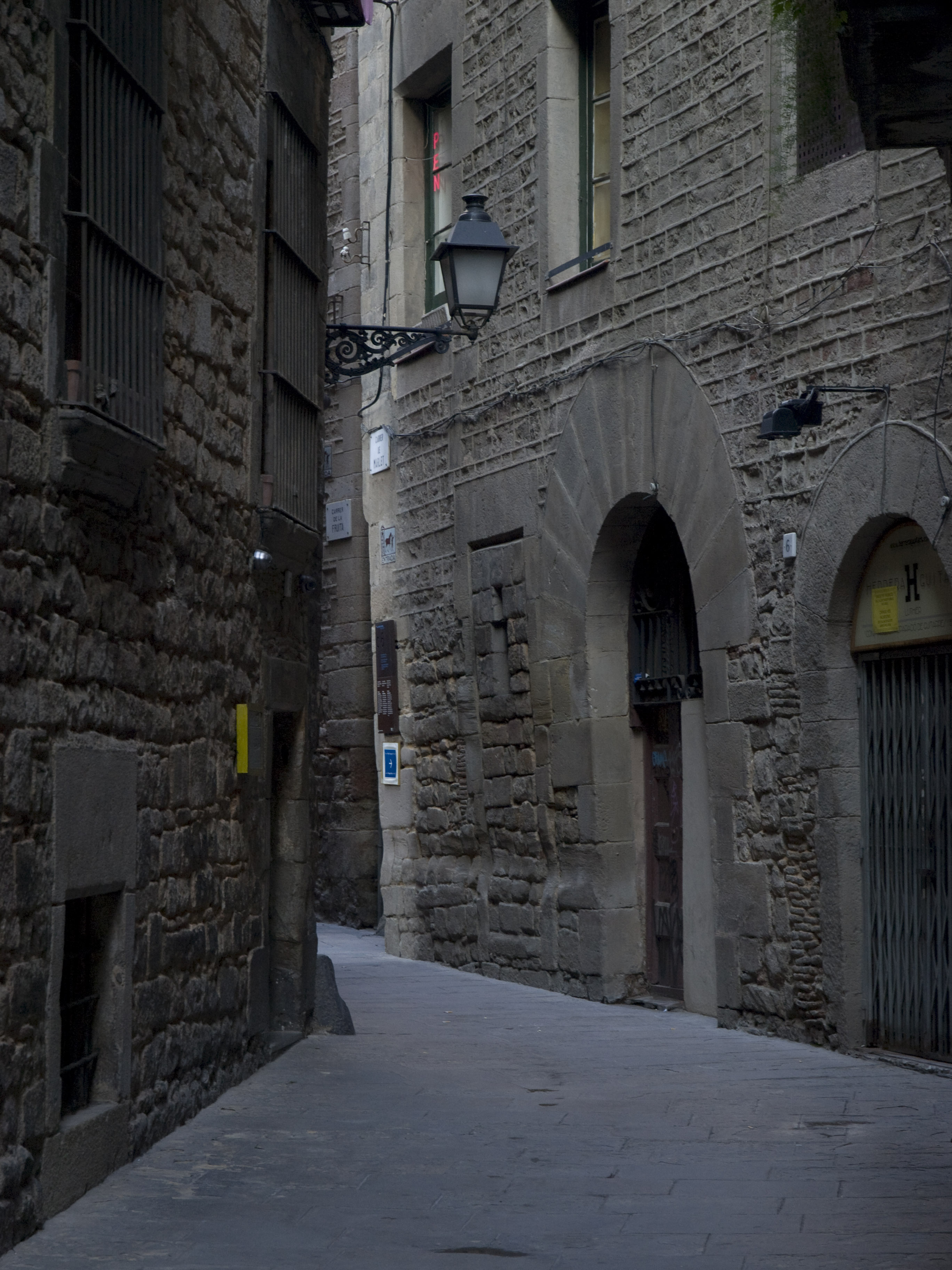
Marlet and Sant Domènec streets (Jewish quarter of Barcelona)

The Jewish quarter of Barcelona (Catalan: El Call de Barcelona) in Barcelona, Catalonia, Spain, is an area located in the Gothic Quarter. The quarter was the heart of the city's Jewish community from the 7th to 14th centuries and was one of the most important Jewish quarters on the Iberian Peninsula during the Middle Ages.

== Etymology ==
El Call means "little street" or "alley" in Catalan, and referred to the set of narrow streets that the Jews occupied. The broader self-governing community of Jews was called the aljama.

== History ==
=== Establishment of the Call ===
Small numbers of Jews arrived in Barcelona soon after 70 CE as part of the wave of migrants arriving in Europe fleeing Roman repression in Judaea during the First Jewish-Roman War. By 1079, the Jewish population in Barcelona numbered about 70 families.

At the end of the 7th century, the Jewish population was enclosed in the Call, which formed around the Carrer del Call, Carrer de Sant Domènec del Call, Carrer Marlet, and Arc de Sant Ramón del Call.

=== Growth and Golden Age (12th and 13th century) ===
Growth in El Call and the arrival of Jews who had been expelled from France by the 13th century made it necessary to expand the Jewish quarter, so the Call Menor, or Minor Call, was created, in addition to the Call Major or Major Call.

By the 13th century, the Call was the largest in Catalonia. Medieval Barcelona was approximately 15% Jewish during its golden age, with most of the 4,000 Jews living in the Jewish quarter. Barcelona earned the reputation as a "city of sages" among the Jews. The Jews worked as doctors, scientists, merchants, and money lenders for Catalan aristocracy. As only Jews could legally lend money, Jews became the official financiers of Catalonia's sovereigns. Jews were officially property of the crown, and at the Fourth Lateran Council in 1215, papal instructions called for Jews to wear hoods and a red button sewn into their clothes to identify them. By 1268, King James I removed the requirement that the Jews in aljama had to wear the badge.

=== Pogroms and Inquisition (14th and 15th century) ===
The Jews' situation in Barcelona worsened when Barcelona was hit by a run of famines beginning in 1333 and with the Black Death in 1348, which killed an estimated fifth of the city's population. Many blamed Jews, leading to an attack on the Jewish quarter in 1349.

The Jewish quarter was hurt badly during Antisemitic mob violence on the quarter by a mob as part of the pogroms of 1391 across Spain. From the outbreak of violence on 5 August through 10 August, approximately 300 Jews were killed.

During the Spanish Inquisition, the Jewish population in Barcelona was all but decimated. King Ferdinand ordered that the size of synagogues be no larger than the smallest Christian church.

== 21st century ==
In the center of the Jewish quarter is the Ancient Synagogue, also called the Sinagoga Major, one of the oldest synagogues in Europe. The synagogue is thought to have existed in some shape or form since the 5th century. During the 1990s, the synagogue was restored and reopened to the public in 2003.

== Jewish community of Barcelona ==
An estimated 3,500 Jews reside in Barcelona in the 21st century, making it the largest concentration of Jews in Spain.
