= Pablo Christiani =

Spanish friar

Pablo Christiani (or Paul Christian; né "Saúl" or "NN שאול בן" ) was a Sephardic Jew who, having converted to Christianity, used his position as a Dominican friar to endeavor to convert other Jews in Europe to Roman Catholicism.

== Early life and conversion ==
Saúl (Shaul ben NN) was born in 13th-Century Spain to a pious Jewish family, and he is believed to have been a student of Rabbi Eliezer of Tarascon. Having married a Jewish woman and fathered children with her, he took his children from his wife when he left her after he converted himself and the children to Roman Catholicism. He then joined the Dominican Order as a friar.

== Disputation of Barcelona and aftermath ==
Prior to the 1263 Disputation of Barcelona, he followed Nicholas Donin's lead in attempting to ban the Talmud, which he argued had "irrational" textual material. As for his participation in the Disputation, it was his attempt to convert Nahmanides and other fellow Jews to Christianity. The failure to convert anybody during the Disputation did not, however, discourage Christiani. Through the agency of Raymond de Penyafort and with letters of protection from King James I of Aragon, he went on missionary journeys and attempted to compel Jews across Europe to listen to his speeches and engage with him in debates, both in synagogues, and wherever else he pleased. He even required his audiences to undertake the expenses of his missions.

== Campaign against Talmud and immigration to France ==
In spite of the protection granted him by the king, Christiani did not meet with the success that he had expected on his missions. He, therefore, in 1264 went to Pope Clement IV and denounced the Talmud by making assertions that it contained passages that were derogatory in regards to Jesus and Mary. He thus persuaded the pope to issue a bull that commanded the bishop of Tarragona to submit all copies of the Talmud to scrutiny by the Dominicans and Franciscans.

The bishop of Tarragona then ordered King James to appoint a commission that consisted of Christiani and others to act as censors of the Talmud. Christiani and the rest of the commission hence redacted all passages that they deemed were hostile to Christianity.

Five years later, Christiani interceded with King Louis IX of France and obtained from him the permission to enforcement of the canonical edict that required Jews to wear badges that would single them out as Jews.

== See also ==
- Criticism of Judaism
- Criticism of the Talmud
