= R. Travers Herford =

British rabbinical literature scholar and Unitarian minister

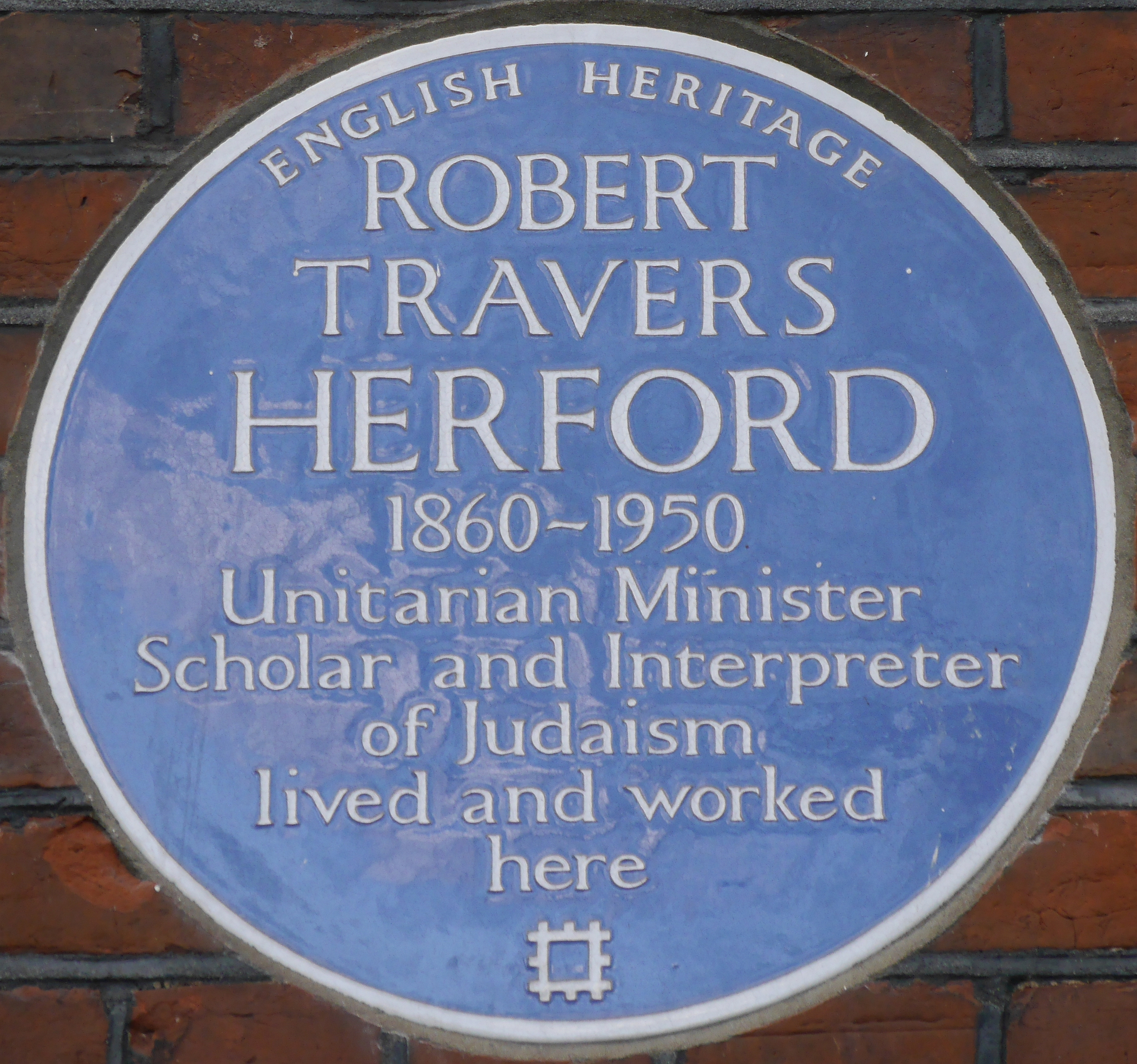
Blue plaque, 14 Gordon Square, London

Robert Travers Herford (1860–1950) was a British Unitarian minister and scholar of rabbinical literature.

== Biography ==
He was the grandson of John Gooch Robberds and brother of Professor C. H. Herford, of Manchester University. Herford was educated at Owens College, Manchester, and Manchester New College, London (B.A. 1880) Then, as a Hibbert Scholar, he studied at the University of Leiden. From 1914 to 1925 he was librarian of Dr Williams's Library, Grafton Street, London.

In 1886 Herford's first effort in Talmudics appeared in an article on "The Jerusalem Talmud" contributed to The Christian Reformer.

He was noted as one of the first Christian scholars of the Pharisees to take a neutral view between Talmud and New Testament.

== Works ==
- Christianity in Talmud and Midrash, 1903
- Pharisaism: Its Aim and Its Method, 1912
- "What the World Owes to the Pharisees". The Menorah Journal. 1919.
- Ethics of the Talmud: Sayings of the Fathers, 1962
