= Toledot Yeshu =

Jewish parody of the biography of Jesus

The Toledot Yeshu (History of Jesus) is a collection of Jewish Gospel parodies about the life of Jesus, called Yeshu in the text. There is no definitive version of the Toledot Yeshu. Instead, many versions exist scattered across its numerous manuscripts throughout medieval Europe and the Middle East. Historians did not seriously study the Toledot Yeshu until the early 21st century, when its value in understanding Late Antique and medieval Jewish perspectives about Jesus and Christianity was realized. The Toledot is interpreted by some to reflect the polemical and defensive context of many historical Jewish communities under Christian rule, as well as a source that fuelled Christian hostility towards Judaism. The story likely originated in Mesopotamian Babylonia, in the same milieu as the Babylonian Talmud, with which it shares several of its polemics against Jesus.

In the Toledot Yeshu, Jesus is portrayed as an illegitimate child conceived from an adulterous rape. As a child, he is a troublemaker who stirs tension in the rabbinic study house. In his adulthood, he is depicted as a sorcerer who taught a heretical Judaism, seduced women, was defeated by Judas, and died a shameful death. His tomb was robbed by a gardener, who hid the corpse in a drainage ditch, leading his followers to mistakenly believe that he has risen from the dead. The Toledot accepts many miracles of Jesus (such as creating birds from clay, resurrecting the dead, and healing the blind), but attributes the ability of Jesus to do this as being because of his magical prowess and sorcery instead of his divinity. According to Encyclopaedia Judaica, "The narrative in all versions [of the Toledot] treats Jesus as an exceptional person who, from his youth, demonstrated unusual wit and wisdom, but disrespect toward his elders and the sages of his age."

== Name ==
Many different titles/names appear in manuscripts of the Toledot Yeshu. Only Group I manuscripts consistently preserve the beginning of the text, and in these, a different name appears in every manuscript. These names include:

- Book of Nazoreans, as decreed concerning Yeshua, the son of Panderas
- Book of the Governor and Yeshu ha-Notsri [Jesus the Nazarene]
- The Story of Yeshua ha-Notsri [Jesus the Nazarene]

Group II manuscripts have more consistent names. They all have a common core: Maʿaseh-Yeshu (ben Pandera ha-Notsri). Different parts of the Group II manuscript tradition add different curses to the core name. In Late Yemenite manuscripts, the curse "may the name of the wicked rot" (from Proverbs 10:7) is added. In Late Oriental manuscripts from Bukhara, the curse "Story of Yeshu the Cursed (Maʿaseh Yeshu ha-ʾArur), may his name and his memory be erased" is added. Italian manuscripts possess a few variations, such as "Story of That One and his Son (Maʿaseh de-ʾoto we-ʾet beno)". With a few exceptions, Group III manuscripts consistently use the title Toledot Yeshu (ha-Notsri).

== Summary ==
The Toledot Yeshu offers a satirical and critical narrative of the life of Jesus, portraying him as an illegitimate child and false messiah who uses magic to deceive people in a manner that discredits Christian claims about the divinity of Christ. The Toledot narrates Jesus' rise and fall, the refutation of his divinity, and a strategic schism that takes place between Judaism and Christianity after his death. While several versions of the story exist, the following summary is based on the Strasbourg manuscript, which possesses a comprehensive account from Jesus' birth until his death as well as what happened to his movement after his death. It is also one of the best known versions of the story.

The story begins with the birth of Jesus. Mary, the mother of Jesus, is a pious Jewish woman who is engaged to a man named John from the house of David. However, she is raped by her neighbor Joseph ben Pantera on a Sabbath eve while menstruating, a period of time where physical contact is prohibited by Jewish law. This incident results in Mary's conception of Jesus. When the truth emerges from Mary's pregnancy, John denounces Mary and flees to Babylonia to preserve his reputation. When Jesus is born, he is called a "bastard" (mamzer) and the "son of a menstruating woman" (ben niddah), titles that reflect the Jewish community's exclusion of him. As he grows up, Jesus excels in his studies. At the same time, he is portrayed as disrespecting his teachers, passing by them with his head uncovered, and he defies the customs of the rabbis. This results in a formal inquiry about him where Mary ends up confessing that the true father of Jesus is Joseph. For this, Jesus is sentenced to death. To escape execution, he flees to Jerusalem.

It is there that an episode takes place that results in him learning the ineffable name of God from the foundation stone of the Great Temple. Upon learning this name, he gains the magical ability to perform miracles, including raising the dead, healing lepers, and turning clay into living birds. He claims to be the Messiah and gains followers. Soon enough, he is arrested by the Jews and brought before Queen Helena (possibly Queen Helena of Adiabene or a conflated figure) on the accusation of sorcery. Jesus defends himself by performing miracles that impress Helena, but his accusers persist. Judas Iscariot, having also learned the ineffable name, challenges Jesus to a flying contest. Judas realizes, during the contest, that neither one of them will win unless one loses access to the powers granted by the use of the divine name. Judas reasons that if he can defile Jesus, then the divine name's powers will no longer work for him. His reasoning proves correct: after he urinates on Jesus, Jesus loses his powers and falls to the ground. According to the narrative, this event demonstrates to the audience that he is a charlatan, which results in him being arrested. The authorities call for his death, and Helena places his fate in the hands of the Jewish sages. They send him to the city of Tiberias and tie him to an ark. However, in one episode, his followers intervene and begin throwing stones at the sages. This creates a diversion that allows them to take Jesus and escape.

Later, on Passover Eve, Jesus returns to Jerusalem with his followers, riding on a donkey. They enter into a study house, but here Jesus is betrayed by someone named Geisa. This time, he is arrested and promptly killed. The authorities try to hang his corpse on a tree, but the tree refuses, because of his previous use of the divine name. Eventually, he is hung on a cabbage stalk, and finally buried. Later, the followers of Jesus visit his burial site but discover an empty tomb: this brings them to the belief that Jesus has risen from the dead, which they proclaim all over the streets, including to Queen Helena. Helena demands an explanation from the sages, who begin to panic. However, a certain rabbi bumps into a gardener who had stolen the body of Jesus. The rabbi shares the news, and the body of Jesus is dragged through the streets of Jerusalem all the way to Queen Helena, a defiling act that definitively disproves the claim that he was the Messiah or resurrected.

== Composition history ==
=== Background and sources ===
The traditions found in the Toledot Yeshu reflect many very early, historical polemics in Jewish tradition towards Christians. Origen, among other early Christian authors, reflects Jewish accusations of the illegitimacy of the birth of Jesus and his practice of magic and sorcery. Many obscenities found in early sources ended up compiled in the Toledot Yeshu. For example, Origen quotes the philosopher Celsus reporting a Jewish contemporaries claim that the paternity of Jesus goes to a Roman soldier named Pantera, an idea that also appears in the Toledot. Justin Martyr's Dialogue with Trypho, another early account, presented a fictional dialogue between a Christian and a Jew, demonstrating the existence of polemical interactions and exchange of stories between Jews and Christians. It is possible that an early version of the Toledot lacked the story about Mary's relationship with a Roman soldier, with the original goal of the story being to return Jewish apostates into the fold, with the aspersion only being added in later versions.

Some historians have suggested the dependency of the Toledot on early Jewish-Christian gospels or that the oral traditions behind the written versions of the Toledot Yeshu might go all the way back to the formation of the canonical narratives themselves. The largest source of input to the Toledot seems to be anecdotes gathered from various parts of the Talmud and Midrash. These appear to be popular adaptations of material aimed against two Christian doctrines: the virgin birth and the ascension. Some of the Talmudic anecdotes seems to be incompatible with each other or with known historical fact. In some instances, the Talmudic source of the Toledot is obscure or of doubtful authenticity, and may not originally have been relevant to Jesus. (Note: For example, the "nativity" account in chapter 1 of the Strassburg version of the Toledot is derived from Kallah, a purported Talmudic tractate whose provenance is so uncertain that it did not appear in print until 1864. Moreover, the anecdote in Kallah may not refer to Jesus at all.) Another source may have been the canonical Gospels themselves. The miracles performed by Jesus in these texts is not denied, but instead, the ability of Jesus to perform them is delegated to the use of Egyptian magic or an appropriation of the Ineffable Name (the Divine Name), but not to diabolical incantations. (Note: Concurrences with the gospel accounts include the fact that Jesus's parents were named Joseph and Mary; that he was born in Bethlehem; that he was bold toward the Jewish elders; that he could perform miracles (here made out to be sorcery); that he claimed to be born of a virgin; that he claimed to be the Son of God; that he applied Isaiah 7:14 to himself; that he raised the dead; that he healed a leper; that Jews fell down and worshipped him; that he entered Jerusalem upon an ass; that he applied to himself Zacharias 9:9; that he charged the Jews with being stiff-necked people; that he applied to himself the 2nd and 110th Psalms; that he walked on water; that he was betrayed by Judas; that he was scourged, crowned with thorns, and given vinegar to drink; that he was put to death on the Passover and buried before the Sabbath began; and that his twelve apostles spread a story of his resurrection.) Others have suggested the use of apocryphal gospels created in the 4th–6th centuries as a source by the Toledot. (Note: For example, the Strassburg version of the Toledot tells the story that Yeshu, using magic, made clay birds come to life and fly. This closely resembles a story about the young Jesus found in the apocryphal Infancy Gospel of Thomas and Infancy Gospel of pseudo-Matthew.)

=== Manuscripts and translations ===
Over a hundred manuscripts of the Toledot exist, with the earliest one dating to the 11th century. The original text was probably written in Aramaic, but it was translated into multiple languages: several Hebrew, Judeo-Persian, Arabic, Judeo-Arabic, Yiddish, and Ladino (Judeo-Spanish) manuscript versions of the text are known.

A critical edition and English translation of the Toledot Yeshu was published by Meerson and Schafer in 2014.

=== Recensions ===
Riccardo Di Segni has categorized the manuscript variants into three main versions: the "Pilate" recension, the "Helena" recension, and a third minor "Herod" recension. These names ("Pilate", "Helena", "Herod") reflect who in the story is named as the ruler of Jerusalem. A more recent classification keeps the "Pilate" recension (renamed as Group I), the shortest version, which only narrates the trial and execution of Jesus. The "Helena" recension is divided into two groups of manuscripts (Group II and Group III), which are expansions on the Pilate version, both begininning with a story of Mary's conception followed by many events narrated between the birth of Jesus and his death. Some manuscripts continue after the death of Jesus with an 'Anti-Acts of the Apostles' narrative focusing on the lives of Peter and Paul and the decisive schism between those who decide to follow Jesus and those who decide to remain Jews. Group II manuscripts focuses on the rule of Queen Helena, whereas Group III focuses more on the aggressive role of Israel, which is portrayed as having the power to defeat Christianity.

=== Date ===
A major complication in the dating of the Toledot Yeshu tradition is that the tradition diversified into numerous versions, and these versions may have different respective dates and circumstances under which they originated. For example, the Helena recension of the Toledot mentions a Christian festival that emerged in the 4th century, and therefore cannot predate the 4th century. Other versions of the Toledot, however, do not mention this festival. As a consequence, the broader Toledot tradition also cannot be said to have a single author or storyteller. The manuscripts Strasbourg BnU 3974 and New York JTS 6312 both refer to Islamic-era information. However, in both cases, these references occur at the very end of the manuscript, where editing is most likely to happen, raising the possibility that these late references were absent from earlier versions of the text. There is strong evidence that the original version of the Toledot Yeshu is pre-Islamic, including: (1) that its dialect of Aramaic was in use from the third to sixth centuries (2) several Christian responses to the Toledot Yeshu were produced in Late Antiquity, especially in the fifth century and (3) the large diversity of Toledot Yeshu recensions suggests a pre-medieval provenance.

The date of the original composition and the final composition of the Toledot Yeshu continues to be a matter of debate, with a range of estimates covering the 6th to 9th centuries for these events to have taken place. The earliest source that explicitly mentions the Toledot Yeshu is an oblique mention by Agobard, archbishop of Lyon, c. 826, and then another mention by his successor, Amulo, c. 849, although some have questioned whether Agobard's reference was to the Toledot.

== Reception and parallels ==
=== Islamic literature ===
Sean Anthony has argued that the counter-narrative of the end of the life of Jesus in the Toledot has motifs that closely mirror the account of the end of the life of Jesus in the Quran (3:54-55 and 4:156-159):

Motif	Toledot Yeshu	Q 3:54–55	Q 4:156–159
Mary is an adulteress / Jesus is a bastard	+	–	–
Israelites plot against Jesus	+	+	–
Israelites/sages claim to have killed Jesus	+	–	+
Jesus only appears to be killed and crucified	+	–	+
Jesus ascends to heaven/God	–	+	+
Israelites quarrel over the fate of Jesus	+	–	+
God cleanses Jesus of his disbelieving opponents	–	+	–
Followers of Jesus are exalted over the disbelieving Israelites	–	+	–
Jesus is an eschatological witness against his ummah	–	–	+

Holger Zellentin has also related the Quran and the Toledot Yeshu's counter-narratives of Jesus' life, particularly in the miracle-lists they both provide for Jesus. The two mention a similar set of miracles, in a similar order, and the Quran and the Toledot Yeshu are claimed to be the only two texts which mention the creation of birds from clay by Jesus among in his miracle-lists; the creation of birds from clay is also mentioned in the Infancy Gospel of Thomas.

=== Christian literature ===
From the 9th through the 20th centuries, the portrayal of Jesus in the Toledot Yeshu has inflamed Christian hostility towards Jews. Some Christian writings took the imagery of the Toledot Yeshu and redirected it to other figures, like Simon Magus or Muhammad.

In 1405, the Toledot was banned by Church authorities. A book under this title was strongly condemned by Francesc Eiximenis (d. 1409) in his Vita Christi, but in 1614 it was largely reprinted by a Jewish convert to Christianity, Samuel Friedrich Brenz, in Nuremberg, as part of his book vilifying his former religion, titled Skin Shed by the Jewish Snake.

An indirect witness to the Christian condemnation of the book can be found in one manuscript of the Toledot, which has this cautionary note in its introduction:

[This booklet] should be shown only to people of discretion, for one never knows what the morrow may bring. [...] I copied it from three different pamphlets from three different countries, not just one, The contents of all these pamphlets were identical, except that I wrote it in the language of prudence [- namely, Hebrew, because Gentiles do not understand it].

Martin Luther quoted the Toledot (evidently the Strasbourg version) at length in his general condemnation of Jews in his book Vom Schem Hamphoras in 1543.

In the two centuries after Luther, the Toledot reached the height of its fame and was sought after by scholars and travellers alike. In 1681 Professor Johann Christoph Wagenseil published an entire volume devoted to the Toledot. Attitudes towards the work became more diversified during the Age of Enlightenment.

=== Modern literature ===
The book is mentioned in the poem The Ring and the Book by Robert Browning.

It is also mentioned in Mitchell James Kaplan's historical novel, By Fire By Water.

In Umberto Eco's Baudolino, set in the XII century, the character Rabbi Solomon is introduced translating the Toledot Yeshu for the curiosity of a Christian cleric.

== Versions of the Toledot Yeshu ==
=== Ramón Martí version, 13th century ===
Long unknown to Christians, the Toledot was first translated into Latin by Ramon Martí, a Dominican friar, toward the end of the 13th century, in a work entitled Pugio fidei adversus Mauros et Judaeos ("The Dagger of Faith against the Moors and the Jews").

==== Summary of Martí version ====
During the reign of Queen Helena, two bronze dogs were placed at the entrance of the Temple in Jerusalem, to deter intruders from stealing the secret of the Shem HaMephorash, the ineffable name of God. If an intruder learned the secret of the Name and attempted to leave, the dogs would bark so ferociously that the intruder would forget the secret of the Name. Jesus of Nazareth came into the Temple in Jerusalem, and stole the secret of the Name, but circumvented the dogs by writing the letters of the Name on parchment, and then slipping this parchment into a self-inflicted wound on his leg, allowing him to smuggle the knowledge out of the precinct.

In spreading knowledge of the Name, Jesus gathers 310 followers and declares that he is the Messiah, the son of a virgin birth, and the Son of God. When asked to prove his claims, Jesus uses the Shem HaMephorash to heal a lame man. As his follower base grows, Helena is appraised of the situation by concerned Jews. Jesus appears before Helena and says he is the prophesied Messiah, resurrecting a dead man using the Shem HaMephorash as further proof. Though Helena is amazed at the miracle, the Jews are in uproar, and Jesus flees to the upper Galilee, where he sends word to the queen not to fight on his behalf. In the Galilee, Jesus makes a large millstone float in the sea to demonstrate his supposed power – and again, Helena is amazed, and commends Jesus' bravery.

The elders of Israel ask Helena to request an audience with Jesus, and then allow a man named Juda Scariot into the Temple to learn the secret of the Shem HaMephorash. When Jesus comes to Helena, he flies upward using the Shem HaMephorash, but the elders command Juda to ascend after him. After wrestling in midair, Juda and Jesus plummet to the ground, where the latter breaks his arm. Injured and disoriented, Jesus is then beaten by a mob wielding pomegranate branches, and is brought before Helena to plead his case. When Helena sees that the supposedly divine Jesus is so injured that he cannot even speak, she declares Jesus to be guilty of deceit, and allows the mob to punish him as they see fit. The wise men attempt to hang Jesus, but no tree can hold his weight, as Jesus had previously sworn by the Shem HaMephorash that no tree would allow him to be hanged. Instead, Jesus is hanged from the sturdy stem of a grassy herb – the same herb that, every year, grows in the sanctuary of the Temple.

=== Strasbourg Manuscript ===
In the Strasbourg Manuscript, Mary was seduced by a soldier called Ben Pandera. The child Jesus shows great impudence by appearing bareheaded and disputing the Law with teachers.

The miracle working powers of Jesus are attributed to having stolen the Name of God from the Temple. Jesus claims messianic dignity and is accused of sorcery by the Jews in front of Queen Helena of Jerusalem, but Jesus raises a man from the dead in front of the Queen's eyes and is released. Jesus goes to Galilee where he brings clay birds to life and makes a millstone float. (Klausner notes that the Toledot scarcely ever denies Gospel miracles, but merely changes good to evil.)

Judas Iscariot, the hero of the tale, learns the Divine Name as well, and Jesus and Judas fly through the sky engaged in aerial combat, with Judas victorious. The now powerless Jesus is arrested and put to death by being hung upon a carob tree, and buried.

The body is taken away and his ascension is claimed by his apostles on the basis of the empty tomb. However, Jesus's body is found hidden in a garden and is dragged back to Jerusalem and shown to Queen Helena.

=== Wagenseil version, 1681 ===
Among the versions of the Toledot, the version published by Johann Christian Wagenseil is perhaps the most prominent.

In 1681, Wagenseil, a professor at the University of Altdorf, published a Hebrew text of the Toledot Yeshu with a Latin translation, in a book titled "Satan's Flaming Arrow" (Tela Ignea Satanae).

The first section treats Jesus's life; later sections deal with the exploits of his apostles. Supplementary chapters tell of Nestorius and his attempts to keep Christians obeying Jewish custom, and the story of Simeon Kepha who is construed to be the Apostle Peter or Paul.

Jesus is portrayed as a deceiver and a heretic, showing a connection to the traditions in Celsus and Justin Martyr (see above).

==== Summary of Wagenseil version ====
A great misfortune struck Israel in the year 3651 (c. 110 BC). A man of the tribe of Judah, Joseph Pandera, lived near a widow who had a daughter called Miriam. This virgin was betrothed to Yohanan, a Torah-learned and God-fearing man of the house of David. Before the end of a certain Sabbath, Joseph looked lustfully at Miriam, knocked on her door and pretended to be her husband, but she only submitted against her will. When Yohanan came later to see her, she was surprised how strange his behavior was. Thus they both knew of Pandera's crime and Miriam's fault. Without witnesses to punish Pandera, Yohanan left for Babylonia.

Miriam gave birth to Yeshua, whose name later depreciated to Yeshu. When he was old enough, she took him to study the Jewish tradition. One day he walked with his head uncovered, showing disrespect, in front of the sages. This betrayed his illegitimacy and Miriam admitted him as Pandera's son. Scandalised, he fled to Upper Galilee.

Yeshu later went to the Jerusalem Temple and learned the letters of God's ineffable name (one could do anything desired by them). He gathered 310 young men and proclaimed himself the Messiah, claiming Isaiah's "a virgin shall conceive and bear a son" and other prophets prophesied about him. Using God's name he healed a lame man, they worshipped him as the Messiah. The Sanhedrin decided to arrest him, and sent messengers to invite him to Jerusalem. They pretended to be his disciples to trick him.

When he was brought, bound, before Queen Helen, the sages accused him of sorcery. When he brought a corpse to life, she released him.

Accused again, the queen sent for his arrest. He asked his disciples not to resist. Using God's name he made birds of clay and caused them to fly. The sages then got Judah Iskarioto to learn the name. At a contest of miracles between the two, they both lost knowledge of the name.

Yeshu was arrested and beaten with pomegranate staves. He was taken to Tiberias and bound to a synagogue pillar. Vinegar was given to him to drink and a crown of thorns was put on his head. An argument broke out between the elders and Yeshu followers resulting in their escape to Antioch (or Egypt). On the day before the Passover, Yeshu decided to go to the Temple and recover the secret name. He entered Jerusalem riding on an ass, but one of his followers, Judah Iskarioto, told the sages he was in the Temple. On a day before the Passover, they tried to hang him on a tree; using the name, he caused it (and any tree they should use) to break. A cabbage stalk, not being a tree, was used successfully to hang him on, and he was buried.

His followers on Sunday told the queen that he was not in his grave, that he ascended to heaven as he had prophesied. As a gardener took him from the grave, they searched it and could not find him. But the gardener confessed he had taken it to prevent his followers from stealing his body and claiming his ascension to heaven. Recovering the body, the sages tied it to a horse's tail and took it to the queen. Convinced he was a false prophet, she ridiculed his followers and commended the sages.

=== Huldreich version, 1705 ===
A third major recension was published by Johann Jakob Ulrich (also Huldrich or Huldreich; 1683–1731) in Leyden, Holland, in 1705, with a Latin translation, as Historia Jeschuae Nazareni by "Johannes Jacobus Huldricus". This was based on a Hebrew manuscript, now lost, and has its own unique variants. A summary of it is presented by Rev. Sabine Baring-Gould, The Lost and Hostile Gospels (1874, London) pages 102–115, who surmised (because of some of the errors and anecdotes) that it was of medieval German origin, perhaps not even predating Martin Luther (page 115). Baring-Gould noted (pages 69–71) that the Wagenseil version contains historical references that place its 'Yeshu' at least a century before the Jesus and Pontius Pilate of the New Testament, and the Huldreich version contains references that place its 'Yeshu' at least a full century after the time of the Gospels.

==== Summary of the Huldreich version ====
During the reign of Herod the Great, a woman of the Tribe of Benjamin named Miriam, sister of Simeon son of Clopas, was married to a man named Pappos ben Yehuda, who kept her confined at home. A handsome man named Joseph Pandera helps Miriam escape, and they flee together from Jerusalem to Bethlehem where they are unrecognized. Several years passed, during which Miriam gave birth to Joseph's child named Yeshua and several more sons and daughters. After Pappos is informed by a traveler that his wife Miriam is alive and cohabiting with another man, he goes before Herod and complains. Herod is outraged at the incident and orders the execution of Pandera and his children, who then flee to Egypt. When they aren't found, Herod orders all the infants in Bethlehem be massacred.

After some time, a famine in Egypt forces Pandera and his family to return to Canaan. Pandera and Miriam move to Nazareth and change their names, while Yeshua comes of age and travels to Jerusalem to study under Rabbi Joshua ben Perachiah. During this time, he begins learning the secrets of Merkabah mysticism and the name of God. When a ball is lost while playing near the Temple Mount, Yeshua cries and removes his head covering, which was against rabbinic law. When challenged, Yeshu negates rabbinic authority. The rabbis then investigate Yeshua, and after traveling to Nazareth and learning from Miriam that he is a mamzer, they shave his hair and wash it to prevent regrowth as a mark of his illegitimacy. After learning the truth of his origins from his mother, Yeshua murders Pandera in a rage and flees to the Galilee.

When Yeshua saw that the Jews were ostracizing and cursing him, he began preaching a heretical interpretation of the Torah. Over time he acquires five disciples: Simon, Mattai, Eliakim, Mordecai, and Todah, whose names he changes to Simon Peter, Matthew, Luke, Mark, and Paul. Using the name of God, Yeshu performed several miracles, attracting many followers, including Yohanan whom he renamed John, whose heads Jesus would then shave and wash to bring into the fold.

Learning that the son of Pandera still lived, Herod orders Yeshu's arrest. While he and most of his disciples are able to escape, Herod's men capture John and behead him. Now claiming to be the son of God and God incarnate, Yeshu extolls his followers to perform graver blasphemies. The rabbis petition Herod for permission to try Yeshu for violating the Law of Moses, and the king acquiesces. The chief general, Judah ben Zechariah, then goes undercover and ingratiates himself to Yeshu, making him believe that he is a loyal follower. Whilst lodging among the people of Ai, Yeshu takes a wife.

After humiliating himself in exchange for a donkey and some bread, Yeshu rides for Jerusalem. Judah arrives ahead of Yeshu, convincing the people of the city to feign cooperation with Yeshu in order that he may let his guard down and be captured. Once finally convinced it is safe, Yeshu stays in the house of his supposed in-laws, and begins preaching and performing miracles within the city. When Yom Kippur comes, Yeshu and his closest disciples do not fast, and engorge themselves on wine which had secretly been mixed with "waters of forgetfulness". Having forgotten the name of God, Yeshu is powerless, and is arrested by Herod's men, and imprisoned. When Yeshu's followers arrive at the Temple for the pilgrimage of Sukkot, they are ambushed and stoned to death outside the city.

The Jews in the area of Vermayza petition Herod not to execute Yeshu, that his suffering may be prolonged, but the king does not listen and has Yeshu hanged outside of Jerusalem just before Passover. This provokes a rebellion in Jerusalem among Yeshu's followers, some of whom tell the people of Ai that Yeshu had been resurrected by a bout of heavenly fire three days after his execution. Even when Judah proclaims that Yeshu's corpse still remains in a filthy cistern in Jerusalem, the agents sent to confirm it deny it, and so the people of Ai rise in rebellion. To put down the revolt, Judah advises Yeshu's uncle, Simeon Clopas, to learn the name of God and perform miracles in Yeshu's name. Simeon compiles the Gospels, in which he included secret hints against Yeshu. Ultimately, Simeon commands his followers not to fight the Jews and then uses the name of God to fake an ascension into Heaven.

After Herod's successor murders a hundred of Yeshu's relatives, Simeon tells his followers in Jerusalem to join him in Ai, where he will perform miracles. After conjuring a raincloud using the name of God, Simeon takes some of his followers up into the sky, only to drop them to their deaths. Those that travelled to Ai by land assume that the people have ascended to Heaven, and they settle in Ai, leaving the city of Jerusalem cleansed.

=== Krauss compilation, 1902 ===
Samuel Krauss reprinted a version recounting that Miriam had been betrothed to a nobleman by the name of Yochanan, who was both a descendant of the House of David, and a God-fearing Torah scholar. In Yochanan's absence her neighbor, Yosef ben Pandera forced himself upon her, (Note: Later Slavonic versions portray Mary as active in the adulterous affair.) coercing her into an act of sexual intercourse during her Niddah (i.e., menstruation, a period of ritual impurity during which relations are forbidden according to Jewish Law). The fruit of the affair was a son she named Yeshu, "the bastard son of a menstruate woman."

Krauss's book, Das Leben Jesu nach juedischen Quellen, published in Berlin in 1902, contained a study of nine different versions of the Toledot, and remains a leading scholarly work in the field (but has not yet been translated into English).

Krauss's work has been joined by Toledot Yeshu: The life story of Jesus, which contains English translations of several versions of the Toledot Yeshu and lists all of the known manuscripts (as of 2014).

=== English versions ===
The first English translation was an anonymous 1823 edition published by Richard Carlile. In 1874, Sabine Baring-Gould published The Lost and Hostile Gospels, which included lengthy summaries of two versions of the Toledot – one called the Wagenseil and one called the Huldreich (so named from the editor of a 1705 Latin edition) – as well as quotations and descriptions of apocryphal and lost gospels of early Christian history. He regarded the Toledot as being a kind of early anti-Christian folklore, largely motivated by the oppression suffered by Jews.

In 1903, G.R.S. Mead, a well known Theosophist, published Did Jesus Live 100 BC?, which treated the Toledot Yeshu as sufficiently authentic and reliable to postulate, on the basis of its mention of historic figures such as Queen Helene, that Jesus actually lived a century earlier than commonly believed. Baring-Gould (page 71) notes that, although the Wagenseil version named the Queen as Helene, she is also expressly described as the widow of Alexander Jannaeus, who died BC 76, and whose widow was named Salome Alexandra, who died in BC 67.

In 1937, the Jewish New Testament scholar Hugh J. Schonfield published According to the Hebrews, which theorized that the Toledot was considerably more ancient than commonly thought and may have originally been derived from the Gospel of the Hebrews, a lost (and presumably heretical) book mentioned by name, but not otherwise described, in some early Christian literature.

However, scholarly consensus generally sees the Toledot Yeshu as an unreliable source for the historical Jesus. (Note: According to Van Voorst, "It may contain a few older traditions from ancient Jewish polemics against Christians, but we learn nothing new or significant from it". Jane Schaberg, on the other hand, contends that the Toledot lends weight to the theory that Mary conceived Jesus as the result of being raped. However, according to Van Voorst, "Schaberg provides no evidence that the Toledot Yeshu traditions may be reliable, even reaching back behind Matthew and Luke, in the face of overwhelming consensus that they are not".)

These books provided translations of the Toledot. Mead included some indelicate verses which Schonfield censored, but Schonfield was the more erudite scholar, and he identified Talmudic and Islamic passages that may have supplied the content of the Toledot Yeshu.

An English translation by Isaac Gantwerk Mayer, a Jewish musician and writer, is available in its entirety at the Open Siddur Project. Along with the translation, a fully vocalized and cantillated version of the original Hebrew text is included. This translation was first published online in 2023.

== See also ==
- Apocalypse of Zerubbabel
- Celsus, 2nd century philosopher, author of The True Word
- Denial of the virgin birth of Jesus
- Gospel of Barnabas
- Historical Jesus
- Historicity of Jesus
- Historicity of the Gospels
- Jesus in the Talmud
- Marcello Craveri, historian and author of the similarly titled The Life of Jesus
- Paul of Tarsus and Judaism
- Tiberius Julius Abdes Pantera
- Toledot, Torah reading from Book of Genesis

== Sources ==
- Gribetz, Sarit Kattan (2022). "Toledot Yeshu". In Wassén, Cecilia; Evans, Craig; Edwards, J. Christopher (eds.). Early New Testament Apocrypha. Zondervan Academic. pp. 154–174. ISBN 978-0-310-09972-7.
- Meerson, Michael; Schafer, Peter (2014). Toledot Yeshu: The Life Story of Jesus. Volume I: Introduction and Translation and Volume II: Critical Edition. Mohr Siebeck.
