= Tiberius Julius Abdes Pantera =

Roman soldier of the Cohors I Sagittariorum (c. 22 BC– AD 40)

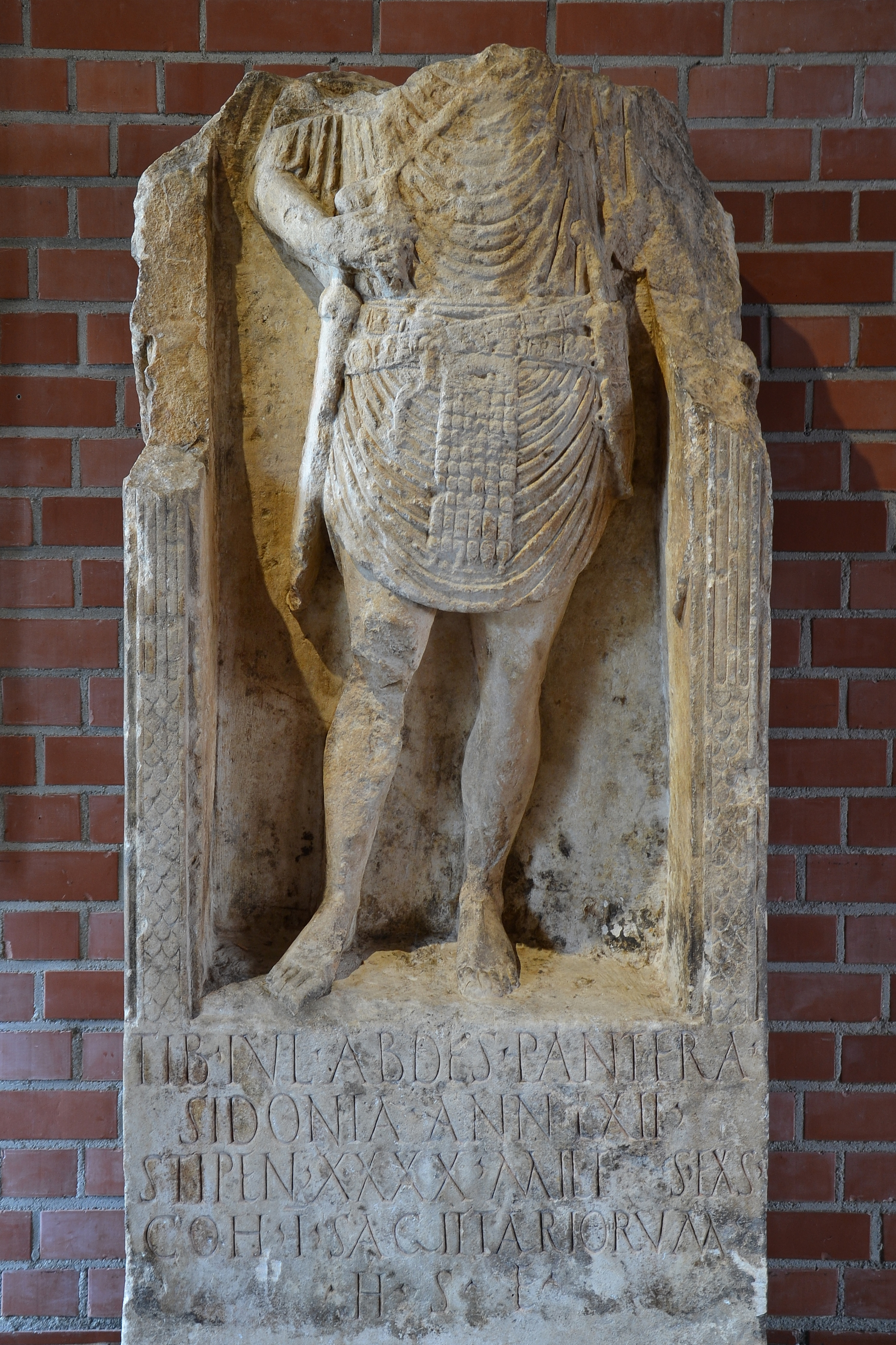
Tiberius Pantera's tombstone in Bad Kreuznach

Tiberius Julius Abdes Pantera (/pænˈtɛrə/; c. 22 BC– AD 40) was a Roman-Phoenician soldier born in Sidon, whose tombstone was found by railworkers in Bingerbrück, Germany, in 1859.

== Tombstone ==
=== Discovery ===
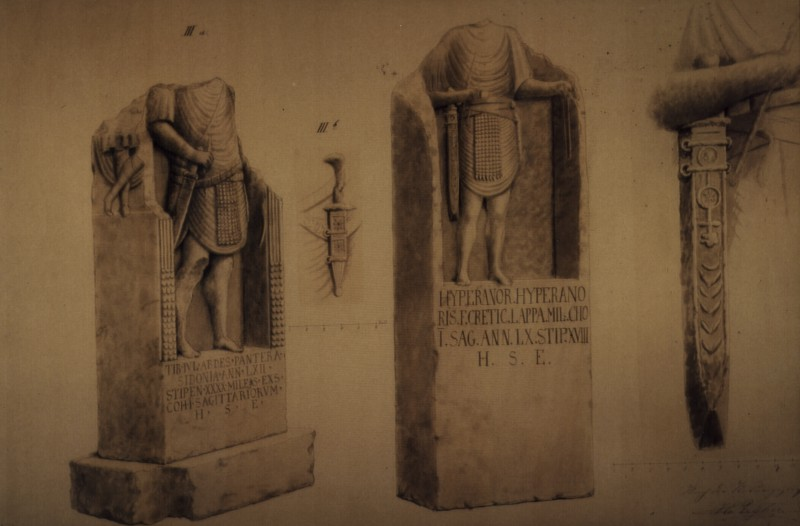
The Roman tombstones in Bingerbrück, Germany, as illustrated when published. Tiberius Julius Abdes Pantera's is on the left

In October 1859, during the construction of a railroad in Bingerbrück in Germany, tombstones for nine Roman soldiers were accidentally discovered by railworkers. One of the tombstones was that of Tiberius Julius Abdes Pantera and is currently kept in the Römerhalle museum in Bad Kreuznach, Germany.

The inscription (CIL XIII 7514) on the tombstone of Abdes Pantera reads:

Tib(erius) Iul(ius) Abdes Pantera
Sidonia ann(orum) LXII
stipen(diorum) XXXX miles exs(ignifer?)
coh(orte) I sagittariorum
h(ic) s(itus) e(st)

Translation:

Tiberius Julius Abdes Pantera
from Sidon, aged 62 years
served 40 years, former standard bearer(?)
of the first cohort of archers
lies here

=== Analysis ===
The name Pantera is Greek, although it appears in Latin in the inscription. It was perhaps his last name, and means 'panther'. The names Tiberius Julius are acquired names and were probably given to him in recognition of serving in the Roman army as he obtained Roman citizenship on his honorable discharge from the Legion.

The meaning of the name Abdes is up for speculation. Abd in Phoenician means 'servant of', and es is perhaps short for Eshmoun/Eshmun, a Phoenician god of healing and the tutelary god of Sidon. However, it is also possible that Pantera was ethnically (and/or religiously) Jewish, given his birthplace. Zeichmann points out that the name Abdes is "commonly attested among Jews and others in the Levant" and has direct adaptations in Greek, Hebrew, and several other languages, many of which are Semitic.

Pantera was from Sidonia, which is identified with Sidon in Phoenicia, and joined the Cohors I Sagittariorum (first cohort of archers).

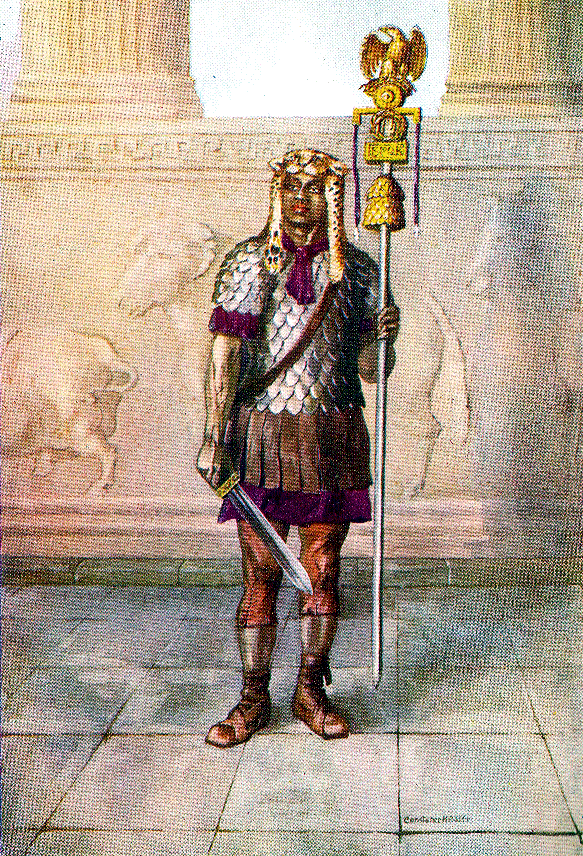
Portrayal of a Roman standard bearer with the fur of a predatory cat on his head.

Pantera is not an unusual name, and its use goes back at least to the 2nd century. Prior to the end of the 19th century, at various times in history, scholars had hypothesized that the name Pantera was an uncommon or even a fabricated name; however, in 1891, French archaeologist C. S. Clermont-Ganneau showed that it was a name that was in use in Iudaea by other people and Adolf Deissmann later showed with certainty that it was a common name at the time, and that it was especially common among Roman soldiers, which would also fit the name Pantera, because the standard bearer of a Roman unit wore an animal fur on official occasions. In this case this would have been the fur of a predatory cat.

At that time, Roman army enlistments were for 25 years and Pantera served 40 years in the army until his death at 62. Pantera was most likely the standard bearer (signifer) of his cohort.

== Hypothesis concerning a connection to Jesus ==
A historical connection between a soldier named Pantera and Jesus of Nazareth has long been hypothesized by some scholars, based on the claim of an ancient Greek philosopher named Celsus, who, according to Christian writer Origen in his Against Celsus (Ancient Greek: Κατὰ Κέλσου, romanized: Kata Kelsou; Latin: Contra Celsum), was the author of a work titled The True Word (Λόγος Ἀληθής, Logos Alēthēs).

Celsus' work was lost but, in Origen's account of it, Jesus was depicted as the result of a relationship (non-consensual or consensual) between his mother Mary and a renowned Roman figure in a time of great upheaval. He said that for this reason she was "accused of adultery but had the child by the leader named Panthera". Biblical scholar James Tabor proposed that Tiberius Pantera could have been serving in the region at the time of Jesus's conception. Christopher Zeichmann goes so far as to say: "Where precisely Pantera's unit was located during the years leading up to Jesus' conception is uncertain, but it is beyond doubt that it was not Judaea or Galilee."

Tabor's hypothesis is considered unlikely by some mainstream scholars due to the lack of surviving textual evidence which support Pantera's paternity. Some scholars and religious figures postulate Pantera was a Roman ancestor of Jesus but not his father.

Historically, the names Pantera and Yeshu were not unusual in the region and were in use among Jews and Gentiles.

=== 2nd-century usage by Celsus ===
In the 2nd century, Celsus, a Greek philosopher, wrote that Jesus's father was a Roman soldier named Panthera. The views of Celsus drew responses from Origen, who alleged it to be a fabricated story. Celsus' claim is only known from Origen's reply. Origen writes:

Let us return, however, to the words put into the mouth of the Jew, where "the mother of Jesus" is described as having been "turned out by the carpenter who was betrothed to her, as she had been convicted of adultery and had a child by a certain soldier named Panthera".

Marcus J. Borg and John Dominic Crossan state that given the antagonism of Celsus towards Christianity, his suggestion of the Roman parentage of Jesus might derive from the memory of Roman military operations suppressing a revolt at Sepphoris near Nazareth around the time of Jesus' birth. The "common legionary name" Panthera could have arisen from a satirical connection between the Greek words panthēr meaning 'panther, various spotted Felidae' and parthenos meaning 'virgin'.

=== Jewish usage in the Middle Ages ===
The story that Jesus was the son of a man named Pantera is referred to in the Talmud, in which Jesus is often understood to be the figure referred to as "Ben Stada":

It is taught that Rabbi Eliezer said to the Wise, "Did not Ben Stada bring spells from Egypt in a cut in his flesh?" They said to him, "He was a fool, and they do not bring evidence from a fool." Ben Stada is Ben Pantera. Rabbi Hisda said, "The husband was Stada, the lover was Pantera." The husband was "actually" Pappos ben Judah, the mother was Stada. The mother was Miriam "Mary" the dresser of women's hair. As we say in Pumbeditha, "She has been false to "satath da" her husband." (b. Shabbat 104b)

Peter Schäfer explains this passage as a commentary designed to clarify the multiple names used to refer to Jesus, concluding with the explanation that he was the son of his mother's lover "Pantera", but was known as "son of Stada", because this name was given to his mother, being "an epithet which derives from the Hebrew/Aramaic root sat.ah/sete' ('to deviate from the right path, to go astray, to be unfaithful'). In other words, his mother Miriam was also called 'Stada' because she was a sotah, a woman suspected, or rather convicted, of adultery."

There are significant differences, however, between the Talmud's Ben Pantera/Ben Stada and Jesus of Nazareth. The passages mention that Miriam was the daughter of Bilgah, rather than Joachim as Christian tradition holds. The Talmud also mentions the husband questioning Rabbi Akiva on how to handle the situation, with Rabbi Akiva being born around 20 years after the commonly held date for Jesus' death. This has led some to reject the connection between Ben Pantera and Jesus, including many prominent Tosafists of the Medieval era. Rabbeinu Tam held that Ben Pantera referred to Pappus ben Yehuda himself, a cell-mate of Rabbi Akiva and local troublemaker.

A few references found in Jewish exegesis explicitly name Jesus ("Yeshu") as the "son of Pandera". These explicit connections are found in the Tosefta, the Qohelet Rabbah, and the Jerusalem Talmud, but not in the Babylonian Talmud.

The Toledot Yeshu dates to the Middle Ages and appeared in Aramaic as well as Hebrew as an anti-Christian satirical chronicle of Jesus. It also refers to the name Pantera, or Pandera. The book accuses Jesus of illegitimate birth as the son of Pandera, and of heretical and at times violent activities along with his followers during his ministry.

=== Scholarly assessment ===
Raymond E. Brown states that the story of Panthera is a fanciful explanation of the birth of Jesus which includes very little historical evidence. James Tabor suggests that Celsus' information about Jesus' paternity is correct, and argues that Tiberius Julius Abdes Pantera's career places him in Judea as a young man around the time of Jesus' conception, so he may have been Jesus' father. This has not gained a wide consensus. Biblical scholar Maurice Casey rejected Tabor's hypothesis and states that Tabor has presented no evidence for Pantera's presence in the region, a conclusion affirmed by Christopher Zeichmann.

Bruce Chilton and Craig A. Evans state that the Toledot Yeshu consists primarily of fictitious anti-Christian stories that attempt to discredit Christian claims about Jesus, and that it offers no value to historical research on Jesus. The Blackwell Companion to Jesus states that the Toledot Yeshu has no historical facts and was perhaps created as a tool for warding off conversions to Christianity.

Throughout the centuries, both Christian and Jewish scholars have generally only paid minor attention to the Toledot Yeshu. Robert E. Van Voorst states that the literary origins of Toledot Yeshu cannot be traced with any certainty, and given that it is unlikely to have been written before the 4th century, it is far too late to include authentic remembrances of Jesus. The nature of the Toledot Yeshu as a parody of the Christian gospels is manifested by the claim that the Apostle Peter pretended to be Christian so he could separate them from the Jews and its portrayal of Judas Iscariot as a hero who posed as a disciple of Jesus in order to stop the Christians.

=== Ethiopian ecclesiastical literature ===
A soldier by the name of Pantos/Pantera also appears twice in Ethiopian church documents. In the First Book of Ethiopian Maccabees he is listed as one of three brothers who resists the Seleucid invasion of Judea. Within the text itself he is cited as receiving his name from the act of strangling panthers with his bare hands. This name and personage also appears in the text of the Ethiopian Synaxarion (Tahisas 25), where he is remembered along with his brothers in the canon of Ethiopian saints.

== See also ==
- Historical Jesus
- Historicity of Jesus
- Julia gens
- The True Word
- Toledot Yeshu
- Yeshu
