= Holger Zellentin =

German scholar of religious studies (born 1976)

Holger Michael Zellentin (born January 17, 1976) is a German scholar of religious studies, Jewish studies and Quranic studies. He is a professor of religion and Judaic studies at the Eberhard Karls University of Tübingen.

His work focuses on late Ancient Near and Middle Eastern religions, the Talmud and the Quran in their historical contexts, Hellenistic Judaism and anthropology of ancient religion.

== Biography ==
=== Early life and education ===
Zellentin received his Diplôme des Études Universitaires Générales from the University of Strasbourg in 1998, a Doctoraal degree (BA cum MA) from the University of Amsterdam in 2001, Master of Arts in religions of late antiquity from the Department of Religion and Department of Classics at Princeton University in 2004 and a Ph.D. from the Department of Religion at Princeton University in 2007.

=== Career ===
Zellentin has previously taught at the University of Cambridge, the University of Nottingham, the Graduate Theological Union, the University of California, Berkeley, and Rutgers University.

Since 2019 he has been Professor of Religious Studies with a special focus on Judaic Studies at the Eberhard Karls University of Tübingen.

Zellentin served as a board member of the British Association for Jewish Studies for five years. He is currently the chairman of the Board of the International Association for Qur'anic Studies.

== Selected works ==
- Zellentin, Holger (2011). Rabbinic Parodies of Jewish and Christian Literature. Mohr Siebeck.
- Zellentin, Holger (2013). The Qur'ān's Legal Culture: The Didascalia Apostolorum as a Point of Departure. Mohr Siebeck.
- Zellentin, Holger (2021). "Beyond Ring Composition". In Klar, Marianna (ed.). Structural Dividers in the Qur'an. Mohr Siebeck. pp. 54–91.
- Zellentin, Holger (2022). Law Beyond Israel: From the Bible to the Qur'an. Mohr Siebeck.
- Zellentin, Holger (2023). ""Honour with Silence the Words of Your Creator": Moses' Silence in bMenaḥot 29b in Light of its Jewish and Christian Context". In Aras, Martina (ed.). Syriac Theology: Past and Present. Brill. pp. 183–208.
- Zellentin, Holger (2025). "Jesus' Miracles in the Qur'an and in Toledot Yeshu". In Ghaffar, Zishan; Von Stosch, Klaus (eds.). Theology of Prophecy in Dialogue. Brill. pp. 21–55.

== See also ==
- Nicolai Sinai
- Islam Dayeh
- Johanna Pink
