= Yeshu =

Name of Jesus in rabbinic literature

Pronunciation of Yeshu

Yeshu (Hebrew: יֵשׁוּ Yēšū) is the name of possibly one individual or numerous separate individuals mentioned in rabbinic literature. The name is thought by some to refer to Jesus when used in the Talmud. The name Yeshu is also used in other sources before and after the completion of the Babylonian Talmud. It is also the modern Israeli spelling of Jesus.

The identification of Jesus with any number of individuals named Yeshu has numerous problems, as most of the individuals with this name in Rabbinic texts are referenced as having lived in time periods far detached from, and non-overlapping with that of Jesus. For example, Yeshu the sorcerer is noted for being executed by the Hasmonean government which lost legal authority in 63 BC, Yeshu the student is described being among the Pharisees who returned to Israel from Egypt in 74 BC, and Yeshu ben Pandera/ben Stada's stepfather is noted as speaking with Rabbi Akiva shortly before the rabbi's execution, an event which occurred in c. 134 AD. During the Middle Ages, Ashkenazi Jewish authorities were forced by Catholic clergy to interpret these passages as being in relation to the Christian beliefs about Jesus of Nazareth. As historian David Berger observed,

Whatever one thinks of the number of Jesuses in antiquity, no one can question the multiplicity of Jesuses in Medieval Jewish polemic. Many Jews with no interest at all in history were forced to confront a historical/biographical question that bedevils historians to this day.

In 1240, Nicholas Donin, with the support of Pope Gregory IX, referred to Yeshu narratives to support his accusation that the Jewish community had attacked the virginity of Mary and the divinity of Jesus. In the Disputation of Paris, Yechiel of Paris conceded that one of the Yeshu stories in the Talmud referred to Jesus of Nazareth, but that the other passages referred to other people. In 1372, John of Valladolid, with the support of the Archbishop of Toledo, made a similar accusation against the Jewish community; Moses ha-Kohen de Tordesillas argued that the Yeshu narratives referred to different people and could not have referred to Jesus of Nazareth. Asher ben Jehiel also asserted that the Yeshu of the Talmud is unrelated to the Christian Jesus.

There are some modern scholars who understand these passages to be references to Christianity and the Christian figure of Jesus, and others who see references to Jesus only in later rabbinic literature. Johann Maier argued that neither the Mishnah nor the two Talmuds refer to Jesus.

== Etymology ==
Bauckham notes that the spelling Yeshu is found on one ossuary, Rahmani 9, which supports that the name Yeshu was not invented as a way of avoiding pronouncing the name Yeshua or Yehoshua in relation to Jesus, but that it may still be that rabbinical use of Yeshu was intended to distinguish Jesus from rabbis bearing the biblical name "Joshua", Yehoshua. Foote and Wheeler considered that the name "Yeshu" was simply a shortened form of the name "Yehoshua" or Joshua.

Another explanation given is that the name "Yeshu" is actually an acronym for the formula ימח שמו וזכרו(נו) (Yimach Shemo V'Zichro[no]), meaning "may his name and memory be obliterated". There are instances in the Talmud where the name "Yeshu" is written with gershayim, a punctuation mark used to indicate acronyms or abbreviations, however, this only occurs in a single tractate. The earliest known example of this theory comes from medieval Toledot Yeshu narratives. This has led to the accusation, first voiced by the anti-Judaist writer Johann Andreas Eisenmenger in his Entdecktes Judenthum, that "Yeshu" was always such a deliberately insulting term for Jesus. Eisenmenger claimed that Jews believed that they were forbidden to mention names of false gods and instead were commanded to change and defame them and did so with Jesus' name as they considered him a false god. He argued that Jesus' original name was "Yeshua" and as Jews did not recognize him as saviour (moshia`) or that he had even saved (hoshia`) himself, they left out the ayin from the root meaning "to save". Eisenmenger's book against Judaism was denounced by the Jews as malicious libel, and was the subject of a number of refutations.

Early-20th-century writers such as Herford (1903, pp. 37–38) and Klausner assume that references to Yeshu and Yeshu ha Notzri in the Talmud relate to Jesus. Indeed, in the Septuagint and Greek language Jewish texts such as the writings of Josephus and Philo of Alexandria, Jesus is the standard Greek translation of the common Hebrew name Yehoshua יְהוֹשֻׁעַ (Joshua), Greek having lost the h sound, as well as of the shortened form Yeshua יֵשׁוּעַ which originated in the Second Temple period. Jesus was also used for the name Hoshea in the Septuagint in one of the three places where it referred to Joshua son of Nun.) The term "Yeshu" is not undisputedly attested prior to the Talmud and Tosefta, let alone as a Hebrew original for "Jesus". (In the case of the Jesus of Christianity, Clement of Alexandria and St. Cyril of Jerusalem claimed that the Greek form itself was his original name and that it was not a transliteration of a Hebrew form.) Adolf Neubauer (19th century), aware of the problem but believing the term to be a reference to Jesus, argued that it was a shortened form of Yeshua resulting from the final letter ayin no longer being pronounced. Hugh J. Schonfield argued in a similar fashion that it was the northern pronunciation resulting from a silent ayin. This view was shared by Joachim Jeremias and Flusser (1989, p. 15) who argue that it was the Galilean pronunciation. The views of these theological scholars however are contradicted by the studies of Hebrew and Aramaic philologist E. Y. Kutscher, Professor of Hebrew Philology at the Hebrew University of Jerusalem, and member of the Hebrew Language Academy, who noted that although the ayin became a silent letter it is never dropped from written forms nor is its effect on the preceding vowel lost (the change of the "u" to the diphthong "ua") as would have had to occur if Yeshu were derived from Yeshua in such a manner. Kutscher noted moreover that the guttural ayin was still pronounced in most parts of Galilee.

== Talmud and Tosefta ==
Isho or Eesho, the Aramaic name of Jesus

The earliest undisputed occurrences of the term Yeshu are found in five anecdotes in the Tosefta (c 200 AD) and Babylonian Talmud (c 500 AD). The anecdotes appear in the Babylonian Talmud during the course of broader discussions on various religious or legal topics. The Venice edition of the Jerusalem Talmud contains the name Yeshu, but the Leiden manuscript has a name deleted, and "Yeshu" added in a marginal gloss. Schäfer (2007) writes that due to this, Neusner treats the name as a gloss and omitted it from his translation of the Jerusalem Talmud.

=== The Talmudic accounts in detail ===
==== Yeshu ben Pandera ====
In the Tosefta, Chullin 2:22-24 there are two anecdotes about the min (heretic) named Jacob naming his mentor Yeshu ben Pandera (Yeshu son of Pandera).

- Chullin 2:22-23 tells how Rabbi Eleazar ben Damma was bitten by a snake. Jacob came to heal him (according to Lieberman's text) "on behalf of Yeshu ben Pandera". (A variant text of the Tosefta considered by Herford reads "Yeshua" instead of "Yeshu". This together with anomalous spellings of Pandera were found by Saul Lieberman who compared early manuscripts, to be erroneous attempts at correction by a copyist unfamiliar with the terms.)

The account is also mentioned in corresponding passages of the Jerusalem Talmud (Avodah Zarah 2:2 IV.I) and Babylonian Talmud (Avodah Zarah 27b) The name Yeshu is not mentioned in the Hebrew manuscripts of these passages but reference to "Jeshu ben Pandira" is interpolated by Herford's in his English paraphrasing of the Jerusalem Talmud text. Similarly the Rodkinson translation of the Babylonian Talmud account interpolates "with the name of Jesus".

- Chullin 2:24 tells how Rabbi Eliezer was once arrested and charged with minuth. When the chief judge (hegemon) interrogated him, the rabbi answered that he "trusted the judge." Although Rabbi Eliezer was referring to God, the judge interpreted him to be referring to the judge himself, and freed the Rabbi. The remainder of the account concerns why Rabbi Eliezer was arrested in the first place. Rabbi Akiva suggests that perhaps one of the minim had spoken a word of minuth to him and that it had pleased him. Rabbi Eliezer recalls that this was indeed the case, he had met Jacob of the town of Sakhnin in the streets of Sepphoris who spoke to him a word of minuth in the name of Yeshu ben Pandera, which had pleased him. (A variant reading used by Herford has Pantiri instead of Pandera.)
- Avodah Zarah, 16b-17a in the Babylonian Talmud essentially repeats the account of Chullin 2:24 about Rabbi Eliezer and adds additional material. It tells that Jacob quoted Deuteronomy 23:19: "You shall not bring the fee of a whore or the price of a dog into the house of the Lord your God in fulfillment of any vow." Jacob says that he was taught this by Yeshu. Jacob then asked Eliezer whether it was permissible to use a whore's money to build a retiring place for the High Priest? (Who spent the whole night preceding the Day of Atonement in the precincts of the Temple, where due provision had to be made for all his conveniences.) When Rabbi Eliezer did not reply, Jacob quoted Micah 1:7, "For they were amassed from whores' fees and they shall become whores' fees again." This was the teaching that had pleased Rabbi Eliezer.

The surname ben Pandera is not found in the Talmud account. (Rodkinson's translation drawing on the Tosefta account paraphrases the reference to Yeshu having taught Jacob by "so taught Jeshu b. Panthyra", in this case not translating "Yeshu" as "Jesus".) The name is found again in the Midrashic text Kohelet Rabba 10:5 where a healer of the grandson of Rabbi Yehoshua ben Levi is described as being of ben Pandera. The source of this account is Shabbat 14:4-8 and Avodah Zarah 40 in the Jerusalem Talmud, but there ben Pandera is not mentioned. The word Yeshu is however found as a secondary marginal gloss to the first passage in the Leiden manuscript which together with the Midrashic version show that the account was understood to be about a follower of Yeshu ben Pandera. (Herford again takes liberty and adds "in the name of Jeshu Pandera" to his translation of the Talmud passages despite these words not being in the original text. Schäfer similarly provides a paraphrased translation mentioning "Jesus son of Pandera" which he admittedly has constructed himself by combining the Talmudic and Midrashic texts and the marginal glosses.) Kohelet Rabba also relates the account of Rabbi Eliezer (Kohelet Rabba 1:24) in this case some copies mention Yeshu ben Pandera as in the Tosefta passage but others instead read peloni a placeholder name equivalent to English "so-and-so".

Jeffrey Rubenstein has argued that the accounts in Chullin and Avodah Zarah reveal an ambivalent relationship between rabbis and Christianity. In his view the tosefta account reveals that at least some Jews believed Christians were true healers, but that the rabbis saw this belief as a major threat. Concerning the Babylonian Talmud account in Avoda Zarah, Dr. Boyarin views Jacob of Sechania as a Christian preacher and understands Rabbi Eliezer's arrest for minuth as an arrest by the Romans for practising Christianity (the text uses the word for heretic). When the Governor (the text uses the word for chief judge) interrogated him, the rabbi answered that he "trusted the judge." Boyarin has suggested that this was the Jewish version of the Br'er Rabbit approach to domination, which he contrasts to the strategy of many early Christians, who proclaim their beliefs in spite of the consequences (i.e. martyrdom). Although Rabbi Eliezer was referring to God, the Governor interpreted him to be referring to the Governor himself, and freed the rabbi. According to them the account also reveals that there was greater contact between Christians and Jews in the 2nd century than commonly believed. They view the account of the teaching of Yeshu as an attempt to mock Christianity. According to Dr. Rubenstein, the structure of this teaching, in which a biblical prooftext is used to answer a question about Biblical law, is common to both the rabbis and early Christians. The vulgar content, however, may have been used to parody Christian values. Dr. Boyarin considers the text to be an acknowledgment that rabbis often interacted with Christians, despite their doctrinal antipathy.

A medieval account of Jesus, in which Jesus is described as being the son of Joseph, the son of Pandera (see translation of the 15th-century Yemenite manuscript: Toledot Yeshu), gives a contemporary view of Jesus and where he is portrayed as an impostor.

===== Meaning and etymology of Pandera =====
The meaning and etymology of this name are uncertain. Besides the form Pandera, variations have been found in different Tosefta manuscripts for example Pantiri and Pantera. Saul Lieberman's investigation of Tosefta variations revealed Pandera to be the original form. (Some authors such as Herford spell it Pandira in English.)

Celsus in his discourse The True Word gives the name as Panthera in Greek. This name is not known from any graves or inscriptions, but the surname Pantera (a Latin rendering) is known from the 1st-century tombstone of Tiberius Julius Abdes Pantera. Origen (c. 248 AD) responded to Celsus' claim by saying that Pantheras was the patronymic of Joseph the husband of Mary on account of his father, Jacob, being called Panther. An alternative claim was made in the Teaching of Jacob (634 AD) where Panther is said to be the grandfather of Mary. Friedrich August Nitzsch (1840) suggested that the name may refer to a panther being a lustful animal and thus have the meaning of "whore", additionally being a pun on parthenos meaning virgin. Herford also considered the Greek pentheros meaning father-in-law, however he dismissed all of these forms including Celsus' Panthera as spurious explanations of the Hebrew Pandera as they do not match phonetically. He noted that Hebrew would have represented the sounds correctly if any of these were the origin. The interpolated form Panthyra appearing in the Rodkinson translation of the Talmud suffers the same problem.

Neubauer understand the name to be Pandareus. The Toledot Yeshu narratives contain elements resembling the story of Pandareus in Greek mythology, namely stealing from a temple and the presence of a bronze animal.

Robert Eisler considered the name to be derived from Pandaros. He also argued that it may not have been a real name but instead as a generic name for a betrayer. He notes that in the Iliad, Pandaros betrays the Greeks and breaks a truce confirmed by solemn oath. He argues that the name came to be used as a generic term for a betrayer and was borrowed by Hebrew. The name is indeed found in Genesis Rabba 50 in the expression qol Pandar (literally "voice of Pandaros" denoting false promises of a betrayer) used as a derogatory placeholder name for a judge of Sodom. The -a at the end of the form Pandera can be understood to be the Aramaic definite article.

==== Yeshu Ha-Notzri ====
In the surviving pre-censorship Talmud manuscripts, Yeshu is sometimes followed by the epithet Ha-Notzri. R. Travers Herford, Joseph Klausner and others translated it as "the Nazarene". The term does not appear consistently in the manuscripts and Menachem Meiri (1249 – c. 1310) in his commentary on the Talmud Beit HaBechirah regarded it as a late interpolation.

Klausner noted objections by other scholars on grammatical and phonetic grounds to the translation of Notzri as "Nazarene" meaning a person from Nazareth (Hebrew Natzrat), however the etymology of "Nazarene" is itself uncertain and one possibility is that it is derived from Notzri and did not mean a person from Nazareth.

In 1180 AD Maimonides in his Mishneh Torah, Hilchos Melachim 11:4 briefly discusses Jesus in a passage later censored by the Church. He uses the name Yeshua for Jesus (an attested equivalent of the name unlike Yeshu) and follows it with HaNotzri showing that regardless of what meaning had been intended in the Talmudic occurrences of this term, Maimonides understood it as an equivalent of Nazarene. Late additions to the Josippon also refer to Jesus as Yeshua HaNotzri but not Yeshu HaNotzri.

Among other passages, the Talmud names Yeshu HaNotzri (Jesus the Nazarene) as a character who was sentenced by God to spend his afterlife in boiling excrement for having “mocked the words” of the Jewish sages:

Onkelos then went and raised Jesus the Nazarene from the grave through necromancy. Onkelos said to him: Who is most important in that world where you are now? Jesus said to him: The Jewish people. Onkelos asked him: Should I then attach myself to them in this world? Jesus said to him: Their welfare you shall seek, their misfortune you shall not seek, for anyone who touches them is regarded as if he were touching the apple of his eye. Onkelos said to him: What is the punishment of that man, a euphemism for Jesus himself, in the next world? Jesus said to him: He is punished with boiling excrement. As the Master said: Anyone who mocks the words of the Sages will be sentenced to boiling excrement. And this was his sin, as he mocked the words of the Sages. The Gemara comments: Come and see the difference between the sinners of Israel and the prophets of the nations of the world. As Balaam, who was a prophet, wished Israel harm, whereas Jesus the Nazarene, who was a Jewish sinner, sought their well-being.

— Gittin 57a:3-4

==== Yeshu the sorcerer ====
Sanhedrin 43a relates the trial and execution of Yeshu and his five disciples. Here, Yeshu is a sorcerer who has enticed other Jews to apostasy. A herald is sent to call for witnesses in his favour for forty days before his execution. No one comes forth and in the end he is stoned and hanged on the eve of Passover. His five disciples, named Matai, Nekai, Netzer, Buni, and Todah, are then tried. Word play is made on each of their names, and they are executed. It is mentioned that excessive leniency was applied because of Yeshu's influence with the royal government (malkhut).

In the Florence manuscript of the Talmud (1177 AD) an addition is made to Sanhedrin 43a saying that Yeshu was hanged on the eve of the Sabbath.

==== Yeshu summoned by Onkelos ====
In Gittin 56b, 57a a story is mentioned in which Onkelos summons up the spirit of a Yeshu who sought to harm Israel. He describes his punishment in the afterlife as boiling in excrement, but encourages Onkelos to convert to Judaism, prompting the Talmud to praise "the sinners of Israel." The current standard text does not name the individual Onkelos summons, but a footnote cites a textual variant that identifies the tormented spirit as Yeshu.

==== Yeshu the son who burns his food in public ====
Sanhedrin 103a and Berachot 17b talk about a Yeshu who burns his food in public, possibly a reference to pagan sacrifices. The account is discussing Manasseh the king of Judah, infamous for having turned to idolatry and having persecuted the Jews (2 Kings 21). It is part of a larger discussion about three kings and four commoners excluded from paradise. These are also discussed in the Shulkhan Arukh where the son who burns his food is explicitly stated to be Manasseh.

==== Yeshu the student of Joshua ben Perachiah ====
In Sanhedrin 107b and Sotah 47a a Yeshu is mentioned as a student of Joshua ben Perachiah who was sent away for misinterpreting a word that in context should have been understood as referring to the inn; he instead understood it to mean the innkeeper's wife. His teacher said "Here is a nice inn", to which he replied "Her eyes are crooked", to which his teacher responded "Is this what you are occupied in?" (This happened during their period of refuge in Egypt during the persecutions of Pharisees 88–76 BC ordered by Alexander Jannæus. The incident is also mentioned in the Jerusalem Talmud in Chagigah 2:2, but there the person in question is not given any name.) After several returns for forgiveness he mistook Perachiah's signal to wait a moment as a signal of final rejection, and so he turned to idolatry (described by the euphemism "worshipping a brick"). The story ends by invoking a Mishnaic era teaching that Yeshu practised black magic, deceived and led Israel astray. This quote is seen by some as an explanation in general for the designation Yeshu.

According to Dr. Rubenstein, the account in Sanhedrin 107b recognizes the kinship between Christians and Jews, since Jesus is presented as a disciple of a prominent rabbi. But it also reflects and speaks to an anxiety fundamental to Rabbinic Judaism. Prior to the destruction of the Temple in 70, Jews were divided into different sects, each promoting different interpretations of the law. Rabbinic Judaism domesticated and internalized conflicts over the law, while vigorously condemning any sectarianism. In other words, rabbis are encouraged to disagree and argue with one another, but these activities must be carefully contained, or else they could lead to a schism. Although this story may not present a historically accurate account of Jesus' life, it does use a fiction about Jesus to communicate an important truth about the rabbis. Moreover, Rubenstein sees this story as a rebuke to overly harsh rabbis. Boyarin suggests that the rabbis were well aware of Christian views of the Pharisees and that this story acknowledges the Christian belief that Jesus was forgiving and the Pharisees were not (see Mark 2:1–2), while emphasizing forgiveness as a necessary rabbinic value.

==== Ben Pandera and ben Stada ====
Another title found in the Tosefta and Talmud is ben Stada (son of Stada). However, in Shabbat 104b and Sanhedrin 67a in the Babylonian Talmud, a passage is found that some have interpreted as equating ben Pandera with ben Stada. The passage is in the form of a Talmudic debate in which various voices make statements, each refuting the previous statement. In such debates the various statements and their refutations are often of a Midrashic nature, sometimes incorporating subtle humour and should not always be taken at face value. The purpose of the passage is to arrive at a Midrashic meaning for the term Stada.

Shabbat 104b relates that a ben Stada brought magic from Egypt in incisions in his flesh. Sanhedrin 67a relates that a ben-Stada was caught by hidden observers and hanged in the town of Lod on the eve of Passover. The debate then follows. It begins by asking if this was not ben Pandera rather than ben Stada. This is refuted by the claim that it is both, his mother's husband was Stada but her lover was Pandera. This is countered with the claim the husband was Pappos ben Yehuda (a 2nd-century AD figure elsewhere remembered as having locked up his unfaithful wife and visiting Rabbi Akiva in jail after the Bar-Kokhba revolt) and that the mother was named Stada. This is then refuted by the claim that the mother was named Miriam, the dresser of women's hair, but that she had gone astray from her husband (a Miriam the daughter of Bilgah, is mentioned elsewhere as having had an affair with a Roman soldier). In Aramaic, "gone astray" is satat da, thus a Midrashic meaning for the term Stada is obtained. Real historical relationships between the figures mentioned cannot be inferred due to the Midrashic nature of the debate. Pappos and Miriam might have been introduced simply as a result of their being remembered in connection with a theme of a woman having gone astray.

Ben-Stada is also mentioned in the Jerusalem Talmud. In Shabbat 12:4 III he is mentioned as having learnt by cutting marks in his flesh. In Sanhedrin 7:12 I he is mentioned as an example of someone caught by hidden observers and subsequently stoned. This information is paralleled in the Tosefta in Shabbat 11:15 and Sanhedrin 10:11 respectively.

=== Interpretation ===
==== Tannaim and Amoraim ====
The Tannaim and Amoraim who recorded the accounts in the Talmud and Tosefta use the term Yeshu as a designation in Sanhedrin 103a and Berakhot 17b in place of King Manasseh's real name. Sanhedrin 107b uses it for a Hasmonean era individual who in an earlier account (Jerusalem Talmud Chagigah 2:2) is anonymous. In Gittin 56b, 57a it is used for one of three foreign enemies of Israel, the other two being from past and present with Yeshu representing a third not identified with any past or present event.

==== Early Jewish commentators (Rishonim) ====
These accounts of Celsus and the Toledot Yeshu do not form part of Orthodox Jewish interpretation. The only classical Jewish commentator to equate Yeshu with Jesus was the Rishon (early commentator) Abraham Ibn Daud who held the view that the Jesus of Christianity had been derived from the figure of Yeshu the student of ben Perachiah. Ibn Daud was nevertheless aware that such an equation contradicted known chronology but argued that the Gospel accounts were in error.

Other Rishonim, namely Rabbi Jacob ben Meir (Rabbeinu Tam), Nachmanides, and Yechiel of Paris explicitly repudiated the equation of the Yeshu of the Talmud and Jesus. Menachem Meiri observed that the epithet Ha-Notzri attached to Yeshu in many instances was a late gloss.

==== The Church ====
Friar Raymond Martini, in his anti-semitic polemical treatise Pugio Fidei, began the accusation echoed in numerous subsequent anti-semitic pamphlets that the Yeshu passages were derogatory accounts of Jesus.

In 1554 a papal bull ordered the removal of all references from the Talmud and other Jewish texts deemed offensive and blasphemous to Christians. Thus the Yeshu passages were removed from subsequently published editions of the Talmud and Tosefta.

==== Later Jewish commentators (Acharonim) ====
Jehiel Heilprin held that Yeshu the student of Yehoshua ben Perachiah was not Jesus.

==== Contemporary Orthodox scholars ====
Rabbi Adin Steinsaltz translates "Yeshu" as "Jesus" in his translation of the Talmud. Elsewhere he has pointed out that Talmudic passages referring to Jesus had been deleted by the Christian censor.

==== Theosophists and esotericists ====
The interpretation of Yeshu as a proto-Jesus first seen in Abraham ibn Daud's work would be revisited by Egyptologist Gerald Massey in his essay The Historical Jesus and Mythical Christ, and by G. R. S. Mead in his work Did Jesus Live 100 B.C.?. The same view was reiterated by Rabbi Avraham Korman. These views reflect the theosophical stance and criticism of tradition popular at the time but was rejected by later scholars. It has been revived in recent times by Alvar Ellegård.

==== Critical scholarship ====
Modern critical scholars debate whether Yeshu does or does not refer to the historical Jesus, a view seen in several 20th-century encyclopedia articles including The Jewish Encyclopedia, Joseph Dan in the Encyclopaedia Judaica (1972, 1997). and the Encyclopedia Hebraica (Israel). R. Travers Herford based his work on the understanding that the term refers to Jesus, and it was also the understanding of Joseph Klausner. They agree that the accounts offer little independent or accurate historical evidence about Jesus. Herford argues that writers of the Talmud and Tosefta had only vague knowledge of Jesus and embellished the accounts to discredit him while disregarding chronology. Klausner distinguishes between core material in the accounts which he argues are not about Jesus and the references to "Yeshu" which he sees as additions spuriously associating the accounts with Jesus. Recent scholars in the same vein include Peter Schäfer, Steven Bayme, and Dr. David C. Kraemer.

Recently, some scholars have argued that Yeshu is a literary device, and that the Yeshu stories provide a more complex view of early Rabbinic-Christian interactions. Whereas the Pharisees were one sect among several others in the Second Temple era, the Amoraim and Tannaim sought to establish Rabbinic Judaism as the normative form of Judaism. Like the rabbis, early Christians claimed to be working within Biblical traditions to provide new interpretations of Jewish laws and values. The sometimes blurry boundary between the rabbis and early Christians provided an important site for distinguishing between legitimate debate and heresy. Scholars like Jeffrey Rubenstein and Daniel Boyarin argue that it was through the Yeshu narratives that rabbis confronted this blurry boundary.

According to Jeffrey Rubenstein, the account in Sanhedrin 107b recognizes the kinship between Christians and Jews, since Jesus is presented as a disciple of a prominent rabbi. But it also reflects and speaks to an anxiety fundamental to Rabbinic Judaism. Prior to the destruction of the Temple in 70, Jews were divided into different sects, each promoting different interpretations of the law. Rabbinic Judaism domesticated and internalized conflicts over the law, while vigorously condemning any sectarianism. In other words, rabbis are encouraged to disagree and argue with one another, but these activities must be carefully contained, or else they could lead to a schism. Although this story may not present a historically accurate account of Jesus' life, it does use a fiction about Jesus to communicate an important truth about the rabbis. Moreover, Rubenstein sees this story as a rebuke to overly harsh rabbis. Boyarin suggests that the rabbis were well aware of Christian views of the Pharisees and that this story acknowledges the Christian belief that Jesus was forgiving and the Pharisees were not (see Mark 2), while emphasizing forgiveness as a necessary rabbinic value.

An intermediate view is that of Hyam Maccoby, who argues that most of these stories were not originally about Jesus, but were incorporated into the Talmud in the belief that they were, as a response to Christian missionary activity.

==== Skeptical writers ====
Dennis McKinsey has challenged the view that the term refers to Jesus at all and argues that Jewish tradition knew of no historical Jesus.

==== Points on which writers have differed ====
Writers have thus differed on several distinct but closely related questions:

- whether Yeshu was intended to mean Jesus or not (e.g. Herford vs Nahmanides)
- whether the core material in the accounts regardless of the name was originally about Jesus or not (e.g. Herford vs Klausner)
- whether the core material is derivative of Christian accounts of Jesus, a forerunner of such accounts or unrelated (e.g. Herford vs Ibn Daud vs McKinsey)
- whether Yeshu is a real name or an acronym (e.g. Flusser vs Kjaer-Hansen)
- whether Yeshu is a genuine Hebrew equivalent for the name Jesus, a pun on the name Jesus or unrelated to the name Jesus (e.g. Klausner vs Eisenmenger vs McKinsey)

== The Toledot Yeshu ==
The Toledot Yeshu are not part of rabbinic literature and are considered neither canonical nor normative. There is no one authoritative Toledot Yeshu story; rather, various medieval versions existed that differ in attitudes towards the central characters and in story details. It is considered unlikely that any one person wrote it, and each version seems to be from a different set of storytellers. In these manuscripts, the name "Yeshu" is used as designation of the central character. The stories typically understand the name "Yeshu" to be the acronym Y'mach Sh'mo V'Zichrono, but justify its usage by claiming that it is wordplay on his real name, Yehoshua (i.e. Joshua, a Hebrew equivalent of "Jesus"). The story is set in the Hasmonean era, reflecting the setting of the account of Yeshu the student of Yehoshuah ben Perachiah in the Talmud. Due to the Gospel parallels, the Toledot Yeshu narratives are typically viewed as a derogatory account of the life of Jesus resulting from Jewish reaction to persecution by Christians.

== Other occurrences ==
The name Yeshu has also been found on the 1st-century AD ossuary of a Yeshua bar Yehoseph, published by E. L. Sukenik in 1931, and catalogued by L. Y. Rahmani in 1994. Although Sukenik considered this the same as the term in the Talmud, he also entertained the possibility that the final letter ayin was left out due to lack of space between the decorations between which it was inscribed. The fully spelled out name Yeshua and the patronymic are also found on the ossuary. Richard Bauckham considers this a legitimate, if rare, form of the name in use at the time, and writes that this ossuary shows that the name Yeshu "was not invented by the rabbis as a way of avoiding pronouncing the real name of Jesus of Nazareth".

The name Yeshu has also been found in a fragment of the Jerusalem Talmud from the Cairo Genizah, a depository for holy texts which are not usable due to age, damage or errors. Flusser takes this as evidence of the term being a name; however, the standard text of the Jerusalem Talmud refers to one of the numerous Rabbi Yehoshuas of the Talmud and moreover the fragment has the latter name at other points in the text.

Yeshu is also mentioned in Isaac Luria's "Book of the Reincarnations", chapter 37. Within the long list of Jewish Tzadiks it is written:

בלכתך מצפת לצד צפון ללכת אל כפר עין זיתון, דרך אילן אחד של חרוב, שם קבור יש"ו הנוצרי

On your way from Safed toward the North to the village of Ein al-Zeitun, passing a carob tree, Yeshu Ha-Notzri is buried there.

== Usage for Jesus in modern Hebrew ==
In Israeli Hebrew Yeshu is used for Jesus of Nazareth in Aaron Abraham Kabak's novel "On the narrow path" Ba-Mishcol Ha-Tsar (1937).

== See also ==
- Jacob the Min
- Jesus in the Talmud
- Yeshua
