= Peter Schaffer =

Peter Schaffer may refer to:

- Peter Shaffer (1926–2016), English playwright and screenwriter
- Peter Schaffer (sports agent) (born 1962), American sports agent

== See also ==
- Peter Schäfer, German historian of religion
- Peter Schaefer (disambiguation)
