= Peter Schaefer =

Peter Schaefer may refer to:

- Peter Schaefer (ice hockey) (born 1977), Canadian retired professional ice hockey player
- Peter Schaefer (author) (born 1943), German scholar of ancient religious studies and director of the Jewish Museum of Berlin

== See also ==
- Peter Schäfer, German historian of religion
- Peter Schaffer (disambiguation)
- Peter Shaffer, English playwright
