= Tzoah Rotachat =

Afterlife location in Jewish tradition

The Tzoah Rotachat (Hebrew: צוֹאָה רוֹתַחַת, romanized: Ṣōʾā Roṯaḥaṯ, lit. 'boiling excrement') in the Talmud and the Zohar is a location in Gehenna where the souls of Jews who committed certain sins are sent for punishment.

== Babylonian Talmud ==
The Babylonian Talmud lists the cause for a Jew being sent to Tzoah Rotachat as those who scoff at the words of the Chazal are judged in Tzoah Rotachat. The Babylonian Talmud also hints that the punishment has more of a physical implication to it. In Eruvin 21b.10, Rashi writes that he who engages in "excessive scoffing" is met with the second part of the same "straining of the flesh", essentially being judged excessively (straining) of his body.

The presence of Jesus in boiling excrement is one of the often-claimed references to Jesus in the Talmud. Onkelos raises up a spirit named Yeshu by necromancy, and asks him about his punishment in Gehinnom. Yeshu replies that he is in "boiling excrement".

According to Gittin, "Onkelos bar Kalonikos, the son of Titus’s sister, wanted to convert." (Babylonian Talmud, Gittin 56b.18)

Onkelos then went and raised Jesus the Nazarene from the grave through necromancy. Onkelos said to him: Who is most important in that world where you are now? Jesus said to him: The Jewish people. Onkelos asked him: Should I then attach myself to them in this world? Jesus said to him: Their welfare you shall seek, their misfortune you shall not seek, for anyone who touches them is regarded as if he were touching the apple of his eye (see Zechariah 2:12). Onkelos said to him: What is the punishment of that man, a euphemism for Jesus himself, in the next world? Jesus said to him: He is punished with boiling excrement. As the Master said: Anyone who mocks the words of the Sages will be sentenced to boiling excrement. And this was his sin, as he mocked the words of the Sages. The Gemara comments: Come and see the difference between the sinners of Israel and the prophets of the nations of the world. As Balaam, who was a prophet, wished Israel harm, whereas Jesus the Nazarene, who was a Jewish sinner, sought their well-being.

— Gittin 57a:3-4

According to Jews for Judaism, the Jesus (Yeshu) in this passage is different from the Jesus of the Christian New Testament; Jews describe Jesus as a 1st century BCE Jewish sectarian who rejected rabbinic Judaism by creating a new religion that combined Judaism with Hellenistic paganism. Writing for the Jesuit America magazine, Gilbert S. Rosenthal wrote, "even if Jesus of Nazareth was the intended subject of some of these troubling passages, they reflect the opinion of one man, not the consensus of Jewish thought then or now."

== Commentaries ==
=== Joseph Karo ===
Joseph Karo of Toledo (1488–1575), in his Kabbalistic work Maggid Mesharim "Sermonizer on Ethics", explains that just as in the human digestive order the liver, heart and other organs receive their sustaining nutrients from the ingested foods and whatever is of no need and "unworkable" is excreted to give fertility to works of low value (sitra achra "other side"), so too in heavenly judgment this soul is sent to the spiritual level equivalent of excrement and those that derive benefit thereof. As to the concept of "boiling", Joseph relays as to imply during the time of heat and anger of that level (i.e. when the oven is hot), the soul is put there. Karo goes on to compare the heresy of Peor as giving sustenance to this specific level of sitra achra.

=== Rabbi Yehuda Lowe's explanation ===
Judah Loew ben Bezalel of Prague (c.1520–1609), in his work Netzach Yisroel ("Eternity of Israel"), provides an in-depth analysis as to this seemingly unconnected sequence of action and punishment. Rabbi Lowe explains, as a rule of thumb, that the logic of Chazal is of an unrelated plane to that of common human intellect. Thus, one who scoffs at it is judged in the opposite of this higher plane, i.e. Tzoah Rotachat, which is considered a matter of irrelation to the relatively superior human body (since it is released as waste) and the antithesis of godly knowledge and presence (as is brought in Talmud Sukka p. 42b that one is obligated to distance himself from the excrement of a child who has the ability of speech since this excrement produces an intense odor comparative to infant who cannot yet speak). Rabbi Lowe concludes that excrement is the polar opposite of refined godly intellect and worship and is thus the natural consequence of the scoffer thereof and of the Jew who chooses idol worship and Shituf.

== Zohar ==
This defined location is quoted in the Zohar;

There is a place in Gehinom - and levels therein - that are called Tzoah Rotachat. and therein is the filth of souls that are sullied from all filth of this world and (the soul itself) get(s) cleansed and are brought up (but) this filth remains over there. and these evil levels that are called Tzoah Rotachat are in authority of this (leftover) filth. and the fire of gehinnom rules on this filth that is left over, and there are liable individuals that sully themselves with sins on a constant basis and do not undertake to cleanse themselves of them (those sins), and they decease without repentance. and (while alive) they sinned and caused others to sin and they were of a stubborn nature all the while (they were) alive and did not submit before their master in this world. These are judged over there in this filth and in this Tzoah Rotachat that never gets released..on Shabbat and Rosh Chodesh and Yom Tov the fire remains but they are not judged (but, on the other hand) are not released

— Zohar vol. 2 p. 150b

== Rabbinic literature ==
The rabbis use only the term "Gehinnom", which derives directly from the Hebrew, and never "Gehenna," which is the Greek transliteration. Gehenna is not mentioned in the Torah in the sense of "hell". Nevertheless, some rabbinic texts maintain that God created Gehenna on the second day of Creation (Genesis Rabbah 4:6, 11:9). Other texts claim that Gehenna was part of God's original plan for the universe and was actually created before the Earth (Pesahim 54a; Sifre Deuteronomy 357). The concept of Gehenna was likely inspired by the biblical notion of Sheol.

The original picture of Sheol is not the first-century "Eternal Lake of Fire" Gehenna as the place of punishment or destruction of the wicked and does not occur frequently in classic rabbinic sources. Gehenna is likened to Sheol, where the wicked go to suffer when they are judged. The Mishnah names seven Biblical individuals who do not get a share in Olam Ha-Ba, lit. "the world-to-come": Jeroboam, Ahab, Menasseh, Doeg the Edomite, Ahitophel, Balaam, and Gehazi. According to the opinion of Rabbi Yehuda, Menasseh got a share in Olam Ha-Ba.

Midrash Konen places Ahab in the fifth department of Gehenna, as having the heathen under his charge. Absalom was consigned to the 7th circle of Gehenna, and according to the description of Gehenna by Joshua ben Levi, who, like Dante, wandered through hell under the guidance of the angel Duma, Absalom still dwells there, having the rebellious heathen in charge; and when the angels with their fiery rods run also against Absalom to smite him like the rest, a heavenly voice says: "Spare Absalom, the son of David, My servant". His half brother Amnon was said to be possibly consigned to the 2nd circle of Gehenna.

Amon of Judah sinned very much, but his name was not placed on the list of the kings excluded from the world to come out of respect for his son Josiah; however a midrashic fragment reads: "No sin is more grievous than idolatry, for it is treason against God. Yet even this has been forgiven upon sincere repentance; but he that sins from a mere spirit of opposition, to see whether God will punish the wicked, shall find no pardon, although he say in his heart, 'I shall have peace in the end (by repenting), though I walk in the stubbornness of my evil heart'".Deut 29:19 Such a one was Amon, the son of Manasseh, for the (apocryphal) Scripture says:

And Amon reasoned an evil reasoning of transgression and said:'My father from his childhood was a great transgressor, and he repented in his old age. So will I now walk after the lust of my soul and afterward return to the Lord.' And he committed more evil in the sight of the Lord than all that were before him; but the Lord God speedily cut him off from this good land. And his servants conspired against him and slew him in his own house, and he reigned two years only.

It is noteworthy that this very midrashic fragment casts light upon the emphatic teaching of the Mishnah (Yoma, viii. 9): "Whosoever says, 'I will sin and repent thereafter,' will not be granted the time for repentance." In the Aggadah. Jehoiakim is still undergoing punishment for his sins. Although the Babylonian Talmud does not include him among those who have no place in the world to come (cf. Sanh. 103b), the Jerusalem Talmud cites him as an example of one who has forfeited his place in heaven by publicly transgressing the law. Jair, a Judge of Israel, was punished with kareth by the Lord for forcing men to prostrate themselves before an altar of Baal:

"Hear the words of the Lord ere thou diest. I appointed thee as prince over my people, and thou didst break My covenant, seduce My people, and seek to burn My servants with fire, but they were animated and freed by the living, the heavenly fire. As for thee, thou wilt die, and die by fire, a fire in which thou wilt abide forever." Thereupon the angel burnt him with a thousand men, whom he had taken in the act of paying homage to Baal.

As for men who committed adultery (with another man's wife), Abba ben Joseph and Abba Arika are both quoted in the Talmud as expressing abhorrence, and arguing that such men would be condemned to Gehenna.

== See also ==
- Hell
