= Bingerbrück =

Coordinates: 49°57′55″N 7°53′09″E

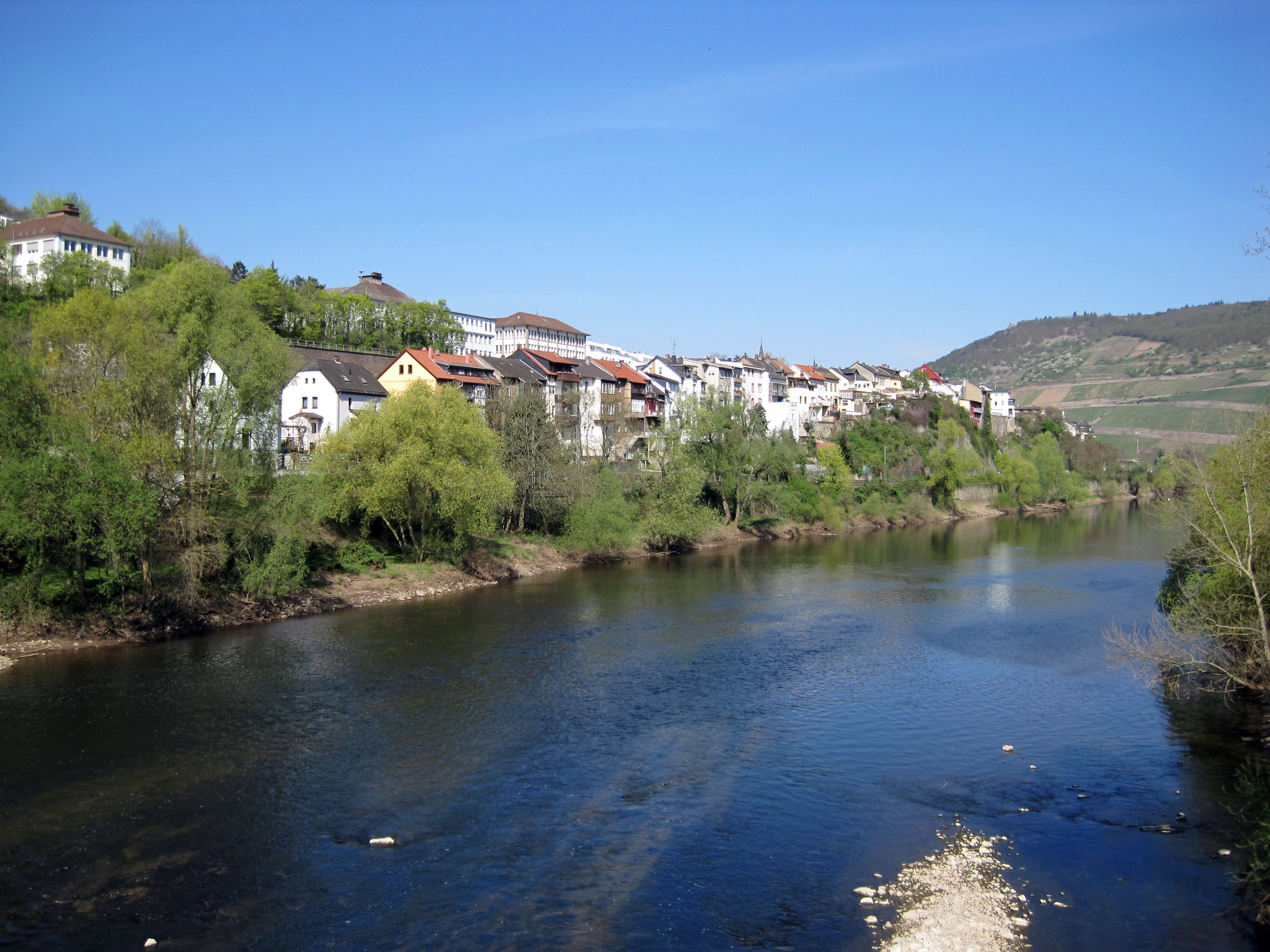
Near the Drusus Bridge

Bingerbrück (German pronunciation: [bɪŋɐˈbʁʏk]) is a Stadtteil of Bingen am Rhein that is located on the opposite bank of the river Nahe from the old town of Bingen. It was self-administering until 1969.

== Points of interest ==
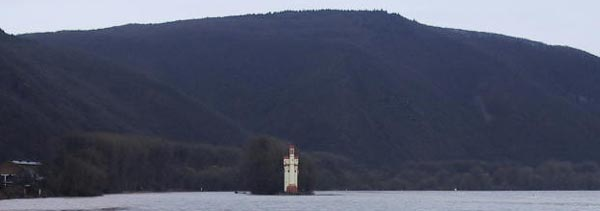
Bingen Mouse Tower

=== Binger Mäuseturm ===
"The Mouse Tower of Bingen" - a customs tower built in 1298 on an island in the Rhine, lies in Bingerbrück's limits.

Its name is part of a legend in which the villainous archbishop Hatto of Mainz plays a major role. To eradicate poverty, he had a number of poor people burnt in a shed, ironically commenting on their death cries: "Hear, hear how the mice squeak!" As punishment by the heavens he was plagued by mice, and he fled to the tower to secure himself. But the mice crossed the Rhine to the island, penetrated the tower, and devoured the bishop alive.

== History ==
=== Roman Empire ===
During the construction of the railway in the 1850s, an extensive Roman graveyard was found.

=== Middle Ages ===
In 1150, Hildegard von Bingen founded the Rupertsberg convent in Bingerbrück. It was destroyed during the Thirty Years' War in 1632. Ruins of the cellar remained as the foundation of the former Herter-Villa and were finally destroyed during the construction of the railway.

=== Nineteenth century ===
After the Congress of Vienna, the Nahe became the border between Prussia's Rhine Province and the Grand Duchy of Hesse. The Nahe bridge became an important customs point, contributing to the rapid growth of Bingerbrück.

=== World War II ===
The railway area was the target of at least seven severe bombing raids. Even today, dud bombs are frequently found.

== Railway ==
Bingerbrück, lying at the junction of the Left Rhine Railway (Mainz-Koblenz) and the Nahe Valley Railway to Metz, was one of the most important railway junctions of the German Empire. Most of the railway areas were demolished to make room for the 2008 State Garden Show.

The former Bingerbrück railway station became Bingen Hauptbahnhof in 1992. Today, Bingen Hauptbahnhof is an ICE/IC railway station, although most of the ICs do not stop at Bingen Hauptbahnhof.

== See also ==
- Tiberius Julius Abdes Pantera
