= Jacob the Heretic =

Jacob the heretic
- Occupation: Healer
- Known for: Being a 1st-century heretic (min) referenced in the Tosefta and Talmud

Jacob the heretic is the name given to a 1st century Jewish Christian whose doings were used as examples in a few passages of the Tosefta and Talmud to illustrate laws relating to dealing with heresy (minut).

== Accounts ==
=== Jacob comes to heal a snake bite ===
Tosefta Chullin 2:22-23 tells how Rabbi Eleazar ben Damma was bitten by a snake. Jacob came to heal him in the name of Yeshu ben Pandera. Rabbi Ishmael tells Rabbi Eleazar that Jacob is not allowed to heal; Rabbi Eleazar insists that it is allowed, but dies before he is able to provide proof. Rabbi Ishmael comments that Rabbi Eleazar is fortunate to have died before breaking the law, and quotes Ecclesiastes 10:8, "He who breaks a fence will be bitten by a snake." ("Fence" is used to refer to decrees of the sages meant to protect Jews from situations where they may unwittingly break a commandment. Typically, Jews are allowed to break the law in order to save a life; here Rabbi Ishmael teaches that one should rather die than traffic with minim.)

The Jerusalem Talmud Avodah Zarah 2:2 IV.I and Babylonian Talmud Avodah Zarah 27b provide a similar account to Chullin 2:22-23.

=== Jacob prepares medicine for a leg ===
Avodah Zarah 28a in the Babylonian Talmud continues the discussion which included the above example and again mentions Jacob. This time noting that he prepared medicine for the leg of Rabbi Abbahu, a distinguished man. The name Jacob the Min for him comes from this passage.

=== The arrest of Eliezer ben Hyrcanus ===
Tosefta Chullin 2:24 tells how Rabbi Eliezer was once arrested and charged with minuth. When the chief judge (hegemon) interrogated him, the rabbi answered that he "trusted the judge." Although Rabbi Eliezer was referring to God, the judge interpreted him to be referring to the judge himself, and freed the Rabbi. The remainder of the account concerns why Rabbi Eliezer was arrested in the first place. Rabbi Akiva suggests that perhaps one of the minim had spoken a word of minuth to him and that it had pleased him. Rabbi Eliezer recalls that this was indeed the case, he had met Jacob of the town of Sakhnin in the streets of Sepphoris who spoke to him a word of minuth in the name of Yeshu ben Pandera, which had pleased him.

Avodah Zarah, 16b-17a in the Babylonian Talmud essentially repeats the account of Chullin 2:24 about Rabbi Eliezer and adds additional material. It tells that Jacob quoted Deuteronomy 23:19: "You shall not bring the fee of a whore or the price of a dog into the house of the Lord your God in fulfillment of any vow." Jacob says that he was taught this by Jesus of Nazareth. Jacob then asked Eliezer whether it was permissible to use a whore's money to build a toilet for the high priest. When Rabbi Eliezer did not reply, Jacob quoted Micah 1:7, "For they were amassed from whores' fees and they shall become whores' fees again." This was the teaching that had pleased Rabbi Eliezer.

== Interpretation of Jacob being a Christian healer ==
During the Disputation of Paris, 1240, and Disputation of Barcelona 1263, references to Jesus in the Talmud led to Christian persecution and Jehiel ben Joseph in Paris, Nahmanides in Barcelona, defended the Jewish community by denying that the "Yeshu" passages had anything to do with Christianity. Jacob ben Meir (1100-1171) and Jacob Emden (1697-1776) also took this position. In the censorship and self-censorship of the Talmud which followed Adin Steinsaltz notes that references to Christianity were censored out of the Talmud, even where the reference was not negative.

Today scholars generally recognise some reference to Jesus in the Talmud but differ as to which texts are original. Recently, some scholars have argued that the references to Jesus in the Talmud provide a more complex view of early Rabbinic-Christian interactions. Whereas the Pharisees were one sect among several others in the Second Temple era, the Amoraim and Tannaim sought to establish Rabbinic Judaism as the normative form of Judaism. Like the Rabbis, early Christians claimed to be working within Biblical traditions to provide new interpretations of Jewish laws and values. The sometimes blurry boundary between the Rabbis and early Christians provided an important site for distinguishing between legitimate debate and heresy. Scholars like Rabbi Jeffrey Rubenstein and Dr. Daniel Boyarin argue that it was through the Yeshu narratives that Rabbis confronted this blurry boundary.

Rubenstein has argued that the accounts in Chullin and Avodah Zarah reveal an ambivalent relationship between rabbis and Christianity. In his view the tosefta account reveals that at least some Jews believed Christians were true healers, but that the rabbis saw this belief as a major threat. Concerning the Babylonian Talmud account in Avoda Zarah, Dr. Boyarin views Jacob of Sechania as a Christian preacher and understands Rabbi Eliezer's arrest for minuth as an arrest by the Romans for practising Christianity (the text uses the word for heretic). When the Governor (the text uses the word for chief judge) interrogated him, the Rabbi answered that he "trusted the judge." Boyarin has suggested that this was the Jewish version of the Br'er Rabbit approach to domination, which he contrasts to the strategy of many early Christians, who proclaim their beliefs in spite of the consequences (i.e. martyrdom). Although Rabbi Eliezer was referring to God, the Governor interpreted him to be referring to the Governor himself, and freed the Rabbi. According to them the account also reveals that there was greater contact between Christians and Jews in the 2nd century than commonly believed. They view the account of the teaching of Yeshu as a parody of Christianity. According to Dr. Rubenstein, the structure of this teaching, in which a biblical prooftext is used to answer a question about Biblical law, is common to both the Rabbis and early Christians. The vulgar content, however, may have been used to parody Christian values. Dr. Boyarin considers the text to be an acknowledgment that Rabbis often interacted with Christians, despite their doctrinal antipathy.

== Jacob's home town ==
R. Travers Herford used a translation of the passages which named Jacob's hometown as Sama in the first account strictly speaking the name of a town nine miles away from Sakhnin (the account is mentioned in corresponding passages of the Jerusalem Talmud (Avodah Zarah 2:2 IV.I), and Babylonian Talmud (Avodah Zarah 27b) where his home town is Sama in the former but Sakhnin (Aramaic Shekhania) in the latter). As a result of the variant reading Herford considered the question of whether the account is about the same Jacob or not, but concluded that it is. Saul Lieberman who compared early manuscripts to identify copying errors found Sakhnin to be the correct reading.
