= Celsus =

2nd-century Greek philosopher

- Other name: Kélsos
- Occupation: Philosopher

Philosophical work
- Era: Ancient philosophy
- Region: Western philosophy
- School: Possibly Platonism, Aristotelianism, Epicureanism or Eclecticism
- Language: Greek
- Main interests: Theology
- Notable works: The True Word

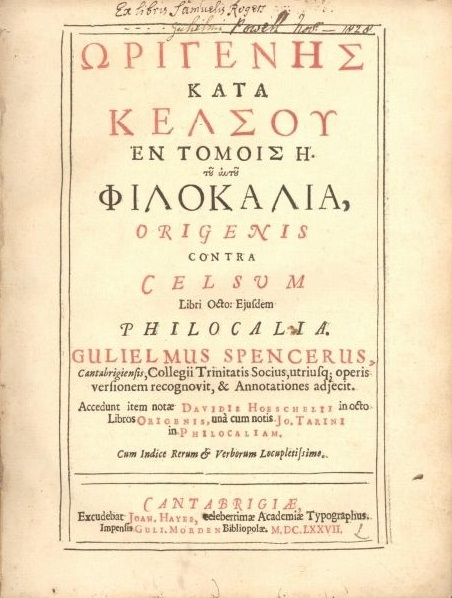
Origen, Contra Celsum (Cambridge, 1676 edition)

Celsus (/ˈsɛlsəs/; Hellenistic Greek: Κέλσος, Kélsos; fl. AD 175–177) was a 2nd-century Greek philosopher and opponent of early Christianity. His literary work The True Word (also Account, Doctrine or Discourse; Greek: Hellenistic Greek: Λόγος Ἀληθής) survives exclusively via quotations in Contra Celsum, a refutation written in 248 by Origen of Alexandria. The True Word is the earliest known comprehensive criticism of Christianity and Judaism.

Hanegraaff has argued that The True Word was written shortly after the death of Justin Martyr (who was possibly the first Christian apologist), and was probably a response to his work. Origen stated that Celsus was from the first half of the 2nd century AD, although the majority of modern scholars have come to a general consensus that Celsus probably wrote around AD 170 to 180.

== Philosophy ==
All that is known about Celsus himself comes from the surviving text of his book and from what Origen says about him. Although Origen initially refers to Celsus as an Epicurean, his arguments reflect ideas of the Platonic tradition, rather than Epicureanism. Origen attributes this to Celsus's inconsistency, but modern historians see it instead as evidence that Celsus was not an Epicurean at all. Joseph Wilson Trigg states that Origen probably confused Celsus, the author of The True Word, with a different Celsus, who was an Epicurean philosopher and a friend of the Syrian satirist Lucian. Celsus the Epicurean must have lived around the same time as the author of The True Word and he is mentioned by Lucian in his treatise On Magic. Both Celsus the friend of Lucian and Celsus the author of The True Word evidently shared a passionate zeal against superstitio, making it easy to see how Origen could have concluded that they were the same person.

Stephen Thomas states that Celsus may not have been a Platonist per se, but that he was clearly familiar with Plato. Celsus's actual philosophy appears to be a blend of elements derived from Platonism, Aristotelianism, Pythagoreanism, and Stoicism. Wilken likewise concludes that Celsus was a philosophical eclectic, whose views reflect a variety of ideas popular to a number of different schools. Wilken classifies Celsus as "a conservative intellectual", noting that "he supports traditional values and defends accepted beliefs". Theologian Robert M. Grant notes that Origen and Celsus actually agree on many points: "Both are opposed to anthropotheism, to idolatry, and to any crudely literal theology." Celsus also writes as a loyal citizen of the Roman Empire and a devoted believer in the ancient Greek religion and the religion in ancient Rome, distrustful of Christianity as new and foreign.

Thomas remarks that Celsus "is no genius as a philosopher". Nonetheless, most scholars, including Thomas, agree that Origen's quotations from The True Word reveal that the work was well-researched. Celsus demonstrates extensive knowledge of both the Old and New Testaments and of both Jewish and Christian history. Celsus was also closely familiar with the literary features of ancient polemics. Celsus seems to have read at least one work by one of the second-century Christian apologists, possibly Justin Martyr or Aristides of Athens. From this reading, Celsus seems to have known which kinds of arguments Christians would be most vulnerable to. He also mentions the Ophites and Simonians, two Gnostic sects that had almost completely vanished by Origen's time. One of Celsus's main sources for Books I–II of The True Word was an earlier anti-Christian polemic written by an unknown Jewish author, whom Origen refers to as the "Jew of Celsus". This Jewish source also provides well-researched criticism of Christianity and, although Celsus was also hostile to Judaism, he occasionally relies on this Jewish author's arguments, to demonstrate the inconsistency of the Christian position, and he also uses Christian arguments among others to deconstruct the Jewish religion.

== Work ==
Celsus was the author of a work titled The True Word (Logos Alēthēs). The argument was contested by the contemporary Christian community and the book was eventually banned in 448 AD by order of Valentinian III and Theodosius II, along with Porphyry's 15 books attacking the Christians, The Philosophy from Oracles. No complete copies are extant, but it can be reconstructed from Origen's detailed account of it in his eight volume refutation, which quotes Celsus extensively. Origen's work has survived and has thereby preserved Celsus's work.

Celsus seems to have been interested in Ancient Egyptian religion, and he seemed to know of Hellenistic Jewish logos-theology, both of which suggest The True Doctrine was composed in Alexandria. Origen indicates that Celsus was an Epicurean living under the Emperor Hadrian.

Celsus writes that "there is an ancient doctrine [archaios logos] which has existed from the beginning, which has always been maintained by the wisest nations and cities and wise men". He leaves Jews and Moses out of those he cites (Egyptians, Syrians, Indians, Persians, Odrysians, Samothracians, Eleusinians, Hyperboreans, Galactophagoi, Druids, and Getae), and instead blames Moses for the corruption of the ancient religion. "The goatherds and shepherds who followed Moses as their leader were deluded by clumsy deceits into thinking that there was only one God, [and] without any rational cause ... these goatherds and shepherds abandoned the worship of many gods". However, Celsus's harshest criticism was reserved for Christians, who "wall themselves off and break away from the rest of mankind".

Celsus initiated a critical attack on Christianity, ridiculing many of its dogmas. He wrote that some Jews said Jesus's father was actually a Roman soldier named Pantera. Origen considered this a fabricated story. In addition, Celsus addressed the miracles of Jesus, holding that "Jesus performed his miracles by sorcery (γοητεία)":

O light and truth! he distinctly declares, with his own voice, as ye yourselves have recorded, that there will come to you even others, employing miracles of a similar kind, who are wicked men, and sorcerers; and Satan. So that Jesus himself does not deny that these works at least are not at all divine, but are the acts of wicked men; and being compelled by the force of truth, he at the same time not only laid open the doings of others, but convicted himself of the same acts. Is it not, then, a miserable inference, to conclude from the same works that the one is God and the other sorcerers? Why ought the others, because of these acts, to be accounted wicked rather than this man, seeing they have him as their witness against himself? For he has himself acknowledged that these are not the works of a divine nature, but the inventions of certain deceivers, and of thoroughly wicked men.

Origen wrote his refutation in 248, and it includes quotes, paraphrases, and references to Celsus's arguments. Since accuracy was essential to his refutation of The True Doctrine, most scholars agree that Origen is a reliable source for what Celsus wrote.

Biblical scholar Arthur J. Droge has written that it is incorrect to refer to Celsus's perspective as polytheism. Instead, he was a henotheist, as opposed to the Jewish strict monotheism; historian Wouter Hanegraaff explains that "the former has room for a hierarchy of lower deities which do not detract from the ultimate unity of the One." Celsus shows himself familiar with the story of Jewish origins. Conceding that Christians are not without success in business (infructuosi in negotiis), Celsus wants them to be good citizens, to retain their own belief but worship the emperors and join their fellow citizens in defending the empire. This appeal on behalf of unity and mutual toleration nevertheless centers on submission to the state and military service. One of Celsus's bitterest complaints is that Christians refused to cooperate with civil society and held local customs and the ancient religions in contempt. The Christians viewed these as idolatrous and inspired by evil spirits, whereas polytheists like Celsus thought of them as the works of the Daemons, or the god's ministers, who ruled mankind in his place to keep him from the pollution of mortality. Celsus attacks the Christians as feeding off faction and disunity, and accuses them of converting the vulgar and ignorant, while refusing to debate wise men. As for their opinions regarding their sacred mission and exclusive holiness, Celsus responds by deriding their insignificance, comparing them to a swarm of bats, or ants creeping out of their nest, or frogs holding a symposium round a swamp, or worms in conventicle in a corner of the mud. It is not known how many were Christians at the time of Celsus (the Jewish population of the empire may have been about 6.6–10% in a population of 60 million to quote one reference).

== Sources ==
- Nixey, Catherine (2017). The Darkening Age: The Christian Destruction of the Classical World. London, UK: Macmillan. ISBN 978-1-5098-1606-4.
- Hanegraaff, Wouter (2012). Esotericism and the Academy: Rejected Knowledge in Western Culture. Cambridge: Cambridge University Press. ISBN 9780521196215.
- Hoffmann, R. Joseph (1987). On the True Doctrine: A Discourse Against the Christians. Oxford University Press. ISBN 978-0-19-504151-4.
