= Johanna Pink =

German Islamic studies scholar

Johanna Pink is a German Islamic studies scholar. She is Professor of Islamic Studies and History of Islam at Albert-Ludwigs-University of Freiburg.

== Works ==
as author

- Muslim Qurʼānic Interpretation Today: Media, Genealogies and Interpretive Communities

as editor

- Muslim Societies in the Age of Mass Consumption: Politics, Culture and Identity between the Local and the Global
- Qur'an Translation in Indonesia: Scriptural Politics in a Multilingual State - Routledge Studies in the Qur'an
- Tafsīr and Islamic Intellectual History: Exploring the Boundaries of a Genre with Andreas Görke
