= Onkelos =

Roman Jewish translator (c. 35–120 CE)

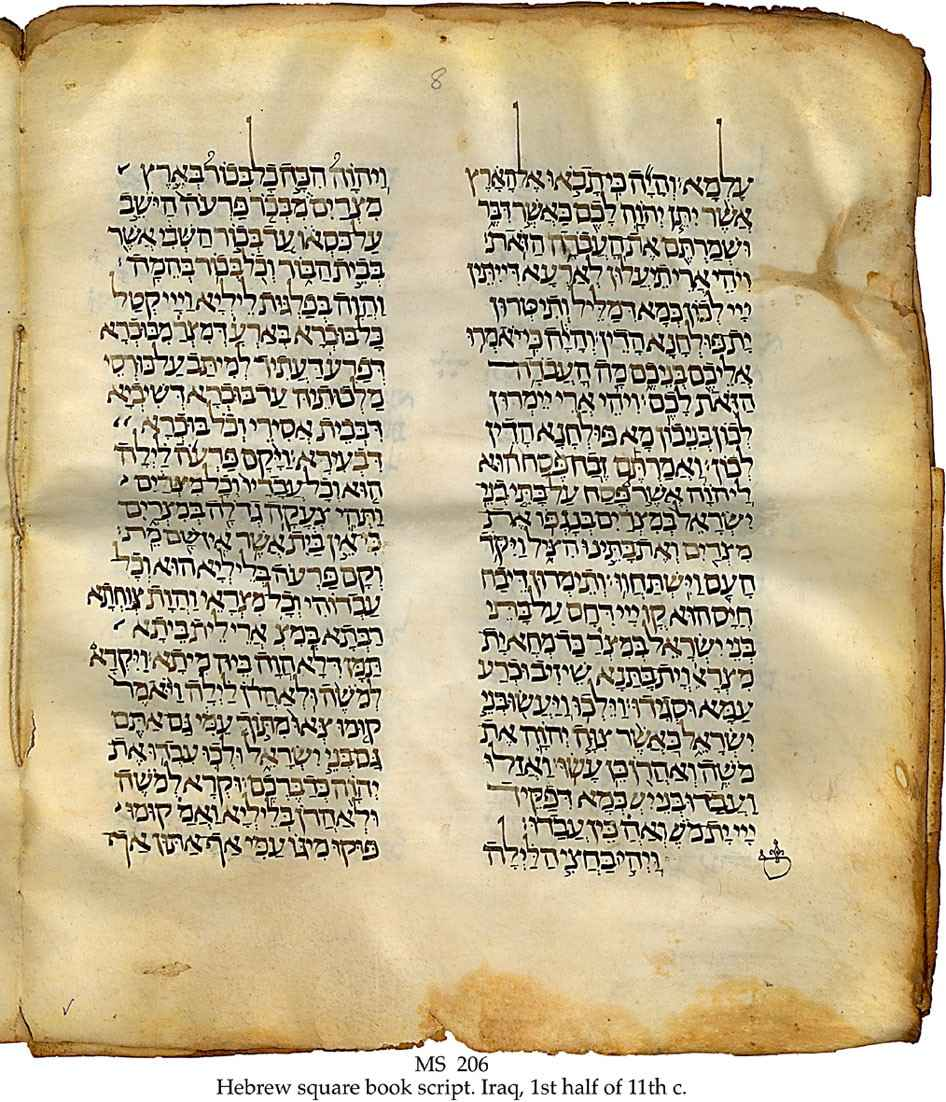
Targum from the 11th century

Onkelos (Hebrew: אֻנְקְלוֹס ʾunqəlōs), possibly identical to Aquila of Sinope, was a Roman national who converted to Judaism in Tannaic times (c. 35–120 CE). He is considered to be the author of the Targum Onkelos (c. 110 CE).

== In the Talmud ==
Onkelos is mentioned several times in the Talmud. According to the traditional Jewish sources, he was a prominent Roman nobleman, the son of a man named Callinicus (Hebrew: קְלוּנִיקוּס Qəlūnīqūs or קַלִינִיקוּס Qalīnīqūs) and the brother of Titus, the Roman emperor. According to the midrash Tanhuma, he was a nephew of Hadrian, and not Titus. These claims have been questioned, as Hadrian's sister, his only sibling, had a daughter, and the only known child of either of Titus's siblings to survive to adulthood was also a girl, later known as Saint Flavia Domitilla.

Onkelos's conversion is the subject of a story wherein he first consulted with the spirits of three deceased enemies of Israel to see how Israel fared in the next world. The first was his uncle Titus, who was blamed for the destruction of the Second Temple; the second was the seer Balaam, hired by Balak king of Moab to curse Israel; and the last was Yeshu, a name used for those who sought to lead Jews astray to idolatry, in particular an idolatrous former student of Joshua ben Perachiah in the Hasmonean period as well as Manasseh of Judah. (In later writings Yeshu is used for Jesus, but opinions differ over whether it can be understood this way in the Talmud.) Onkelos is said to have seen all of them subjected to humiliating punishments for harming Israel. However, while Titus and Balaam dissuade him from converting, Yeshu encourages him to join the Jewish people (prompting the Talmud to praise "the sinners of Israel"). The earlier Jerusalem Talmud gives the subject of these stories as Aquilas the proselyte, often understood as being a person other than Onkelos. The difficulty with this theory, however, is that the Jerusalem Talmud says explicitly that he (Aquilas the proselyte) translated the Torah under Eliezer ben Hurcanus and Joshua ben Hananiah. The Babylonian Talmud repeats the same oral tradition, but this time calls him by the name Onkelos the proselyte, which leads one to conclude that the name is a mere variant of Aquila, applied in error to the Aramaic instead of the Greek translation. This view is supported by Epiphanius of Salamis (4th century).

The following story about Aquila's conversion appears in Midrash Rabbah:

Once, Aquilas (עקילס) said to Hadrian the king, ‘I wish to convert and to become one of Israel.’ He answered him, ‘You are seeking [to join] that nation? How have I despised it! How have I killed it; the most downtrodden of the nations you are asking to join!? What have you seen in them that you wish to be made a proselyte?’ He replied, ‘The smallest of them knows how the Holy One, blessed be He, created the universe; what was created on the first day and what was created on the second day, and how many [years] have passed since the universe was created, and by what [things] the world is sustained. Moreover, their Divine Law is the truth.’ He said to him, ‘Go and study their Divine Law, but do not be circumcised.’ Aquilas then said to him, ‘Even the wisest man in your kingdom, and an elder who is aged one-hundred, cannot study their Divine Law if he is not circumcised, for thus is it written: "He makes known his words to Jacob, his precepts and judgments to Israel. He has not done the like of which to any other nation." Unto whom, then, [has he done it]? Unto the sons of Israel!’

After his conversion, the Talmud records a story of how the Roman emperor tried to have Onkelos arrested. Onkelos cited verses from the Tanakh to the first Roman contubernium, who then converted. The second contubernium was also converted, after he juxtaposed God's personal guidance of Israel in the Book of Numbers to the Roman social hierarchy. A similar tactic was used for the third contubernium, where Onkelos compared his mezuzah to a symbol of God guarding the home of every Jew, in contrast to a Roman king who has his servants guard him. The third contubernium also converted and no more were sent.

== The Targum of Onkelos ==
According to tradition, Onkelos authored the Targum Onkelos as an exposition of the official interpretation of the peshat (basic meaning) of the Torah as received by rabbis Eliezer ben Hurcanus and Joshua ben Hananiah. This helped canonise the status of both Onkelos and his Targum in the Jewish tradition.
