= Islam Dayeh =

Islamic studies scholar

Islam Dayeh is an Islamic studies scholar and research professor of Arabic and Islamic studies in the Department of Languages and Cultures at Ghent University. He is the editor-in-chief of the journal Philological Encounters.

== Biography ==
=== Early life and education ===
Dayeh earned a bachelor's degree in Islamic Studies from the University of Jordan in Amman in 2002. He then completed a master's degree in Islamic Studies at Leiden University in 2003. In 2009, he received a Master of Studies in Jewish Studies from the University of Oxford. He later obtained a PhD in Arabic Studies from the Free University of Berlin in 2012.

=== Career ===
He has worked at Columbia University, the University of Turin, the American University in Cairo, the Luxembourg School of Religion and Society, the Library of Congress, the Arab Center for Research and Policy Studies in Doha, and the Maria Sibylla Merian Center for Conviviality and Inequality in Latin America in São Paulo. Prior to his appointment at Ghent University in 2024, he was an assistant professor of Arabic Studies at the Free University of Berlin.

== Scholarly works ==
Dayeh is the academic director of the research program Zukunftsphilologie: Revisiting the Canons of Textual Scholarship from 2010 to 2023, and was the principal investigator for the project Arabic Philology and Textual Practices in the Early Modern Period, funded by the Deutsche Forschungsgemeinschaft from 2015 to 2019. He is also the principal investigator of the European Research Council Consolidator Grant project Know: Polymathy and Interdisciplinarity in Premodern Islamic Epistemic Cultures, which investigates the interplay of various disciplines of knowledge during the postformative period between 1200 and 1800 CE.
