= The True Word =

2nd-century treatise by Celsus criticising Christianity

The True Word (or Discourse, Account, or Doctrine; Ancient Greek: Λόγος Ἀληθής, Logos Alēthēs) is a now-fragmentary treatise in which the ancient Greek philosopher Celsus (fl. AD 175–177) addressed many principal points of early Christianity and argued against their validity. In The True Word, Celsus attacked Christianity in three ways: by attacking its philosophical claims, by marking it as a phenomenon associated with the uneducated and lower class, and by cautioning his audience that it was a danger to the Roman Empire. Information concerning the work exists only in the extensive quotations from it in the Contra Celsum ("Against Celsus"), written some seventy years later by the Christian Origen. These are believed to be accurate, but may not give a fully comprehensive picture of the original work.

== Criticism of Christianity before Celsus ==
Celsus was one of many Roman writers and philosophers who wrote and spoke out against Christianity, feeling that its doctrines were either inscrutable or foolish. One of the primary problems that most Roman citizens and the Imperial government had regarding the Christians was their lifestyle and refusal to participate in the sacrifices that were regularly made (as it was prior to Decius' Edict in 250 AD). Sacrifices were an integral part of Roman politics, religion, and culture. Roman writers, who often professed to be loyal members of the Empire and Roman society, were also "troubled by the seeming incoherence of the Christian position toward society and towards the recognized religion of the state". All of these factors led to Christians being classified as enemies of society. Others who wrote polemical works against Christianity included Crescens, Fronto and Lucian.

== Celsus and his work ==
Celsus was either a Greek or a Roman who wrote during the second century CE. Little is known about his origins or life. The work in its original form has been lost and the True Word survives as excerpts from a work by the Christian scholar Origen, who quotes Celsus to rebut him.

Origen states that Celsus lived under Hadrian and following emperors around the half of the second century. In his work "Contra Celsus" he accuses him of veiled epicureanism while writing in platonist philosophical writings. Modern scholars consider more likely that Celsus wrote in the second half of the century, probably around 170 to 180 AD, led by Chadwick who argues for the possible Numenius of Apamea influence and defense against barbarian invasions more suitable to the time of Marcus Aurelius.

Most modern scholars are in agreement that Celsus did not rely on the "rumors and hearsay evidence" but rather drew upon his own observations and displayed knowledge of both the Hebrew Bible and New Testament of the Christian Bible, as well as other Jewish and Christian writings.

== Philosophical and theological arguments ==
Celsus' first main point in his True Word was to argue against the validity of Christianity. In his opinion Christian theology was based on an amalgamation of false Eastern philosophical ideas from India and Iran hastily tied together. He stated that Christians would "weave together erroneous opinions drawn from ancient sources and trumpet them aloud".

Celsus gave a detailed critique of Christian doctrine, and why it should not have been believed by anyone. He denied the virgin birth of Jesus, and accused Mary of being an adulteress turned out by her husband. The remainder of Christian stories – what now makes up the Christian Bible – Celsus found insipid and unappealing compared to Greek and Roman legends of powerful and colorful gods. Celsus also found Christian philosophy lacking when compared to secular philosophy, and declared that "things are stated much better among the Greeks". Celsus used Plato as the representative for Greek philosophers and, according to him, when comparing the two philosophical traditions, Christianity appeared far worse, as "Plato is not guilty of boasting and falsehood", a crime which Celsus feels is a trademark of Christian theologians. The only connection Celsus made between Greek philosophy and Christianity was when he asserted that "Jesus perverted the words of the philosopher" (i.e. Plato).

When compared with the gods of Roman and Greek mythology, Celsus found the Christian God lacking, and declared that he could not be a god as he was neither all-knowing nor all-powerful. Celsus deduced no explanation for the actions of the Christian God, such as the floods, natural disasters, and the introduction of evil into the world, except that God wanted to draw attention to his greatness because he felt humanity was giving him "less than his due". Celsus concluded that Christians used the explanation of God "testing" them to disguise the fact that their God was not powerful enough to successfully fight Satan, but was instead "helpless". Celsus wrote that Satan was either a mortal invention used by Christians to frighten others into believing their philosophies and joining them, or if he did indeed exist then he was proof that God was not all-powerful, but rather a weak lesser god and a bad one, for only a vindictive and insecure being would punish mankind for being tricked by an evil that he has been too weak to stop.

Celsus accused Christians of "blind faith", and used it to further support his claim that Christianity was a false religion. In his opinion, the main tenet of Christianity was "Do not ask questions, just believe" and "Thy faith will save thee".

== Status and the appeal of Christianity ==
Celsus states that Christianity was a phenomenon limited primarily to the lower class. He claimed that Christians actively sought out and converted the ignorant, uneducated, and lower class, as they were the only people who would believe in such a theology and follow its doctrines. If an individual was from the upper class, and therefore well educated and naturally of good character, they would not be converted because they could not possibly believe in the assumptions one had to in order to be considered Christian. Celsus revealed himself to be a member of the upper class when he makes his statements regarding Jesus, who to his mind could not have been the son of God as he was born a peasant. The True Word stated that Mary would have been unworthy to be noticed by God "because she was neither rich nor of royal rank". Celsus also claimed that Christianity was against personal betterment, as that could cause their followers to discover the fallacies within their religion. Celsus said that Christians convert by "lead[ing] on wicked men by empty hopes, and to persuade them to despise better things, saying that if they refrain from them it will be better".

== Christianity as a danger to Rome ==
Celsus' main argument against Christianity, and why he attacked it with such vigor, was that he considered it a divisive and destructive force that would harm both the Roman Empire and society. Adherence to the state-supported Roman religion was compulsory and the Roman authorities felt it was necessary for the effective management of the political system. One of the most integral parts of the Roman state religion was reverence and occasional sacrifices for the Emperor, an act that Christians continually refused to participate in, as in their opinion it came too close to idolatry and worship of a God that was not their own.

Celsus listed many reasons for how his Roman readers could easily deduce that Christianity was endangering their unity and the stability of the Empire. According to him, Christianity originated from Judaism, whose adherents, although living within the Empire, had already revolted against Roman rule several times. The Christian community then became further divided among themselves, and Celsus complained that "matters are determined in different ways by the various sects". This dissension between different factions within Christianity proved to the Romans that Christians who could not even draw together under their own shared beliefs were naturally a divisive people and not only caused friction within their own philosophy but would disrupt the unity of the Empire. Finally, Celsus and other Roman writers believed that "Christians are dangerous precisely because they put the advancement of their beliefs above the common good and the welfare of the state".

The secrecy in which Christians met and practiced was another problem for Celsus. He commented that they "entered into secret associations with each other contrary to law". Celsus stated that there was nothing wrong with swearing allegiance to a king or emperor, as he provided the stable environment in which all citizens could freely live, and in return it was the duty of each Roman citizen to assist the Emperor and "labor with him in the maintenance of justice".

Celsus provided only one solution to solve the problems that he believed Christianity would inevitably create within the Empire. He commanded that Christians must both respect the Emperor and perform rituals to the gods of the Roman state. If they could not or would not participate in the Imperial religion they must not "take any share in the affairs of life; but […] depart hence with all speed and leave no posterity behind them".

== Editions and Commentaries ==
- Lona, Horacio E. (2005): Die »Wahre Lehre« des Kelsos. Kommentar zu frühchristlichen Apologeten, supplementary volume 1. Freiburg: Herder, ISBN 3-451-28599-1 (extensive commentary).
- Celsus (1987). On The True Doctrine: A Discourse Against the Christians. Translated by Hoffman, R. Joseph. New York: Oxford University Press.
- Celsus (2001). Fragments from Celsus' lost True Discourse. Archived from the original on 27 April 2006.
- Wilken, Robert Louis (1984). "Celsus: A Conservative Intellectual". The Christians as the Romans Saw Them (Second, reprinted ed.). New Haven: Yale University Press. pp. 94–117. ISBN 978-0-300-03066-2. JSTOR j.ctt32bdb2 – via the Internet Archive.
