= Peter Schäfer =

German scholar of ancient Judaism and Christianity (b. 1943)

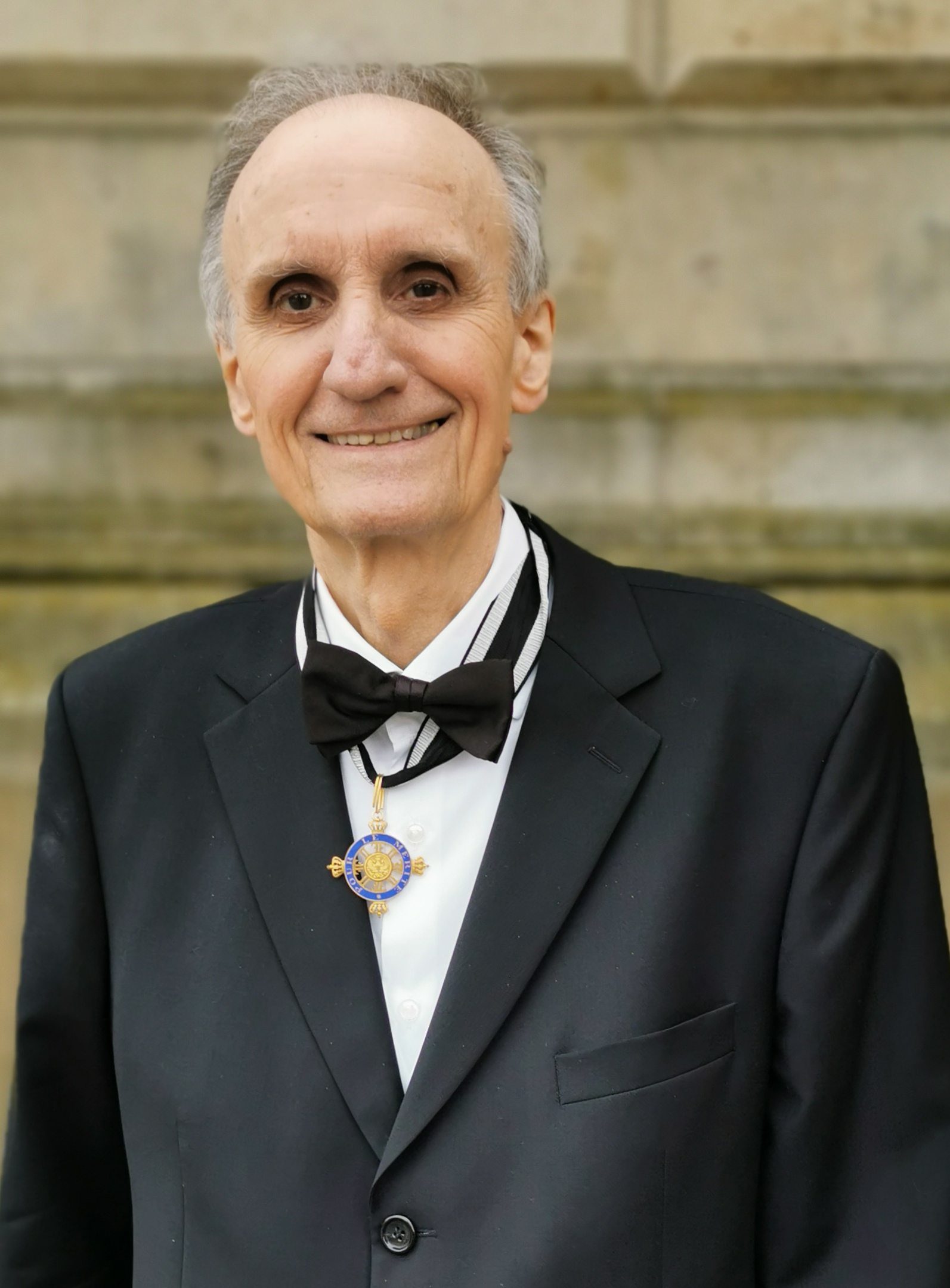
Peter Schäfer

Peter Schäfer (born 29 June 1943, Mülheim an der Ruhr, North Rhine-Westphalia) is a prolific German scholar of ancient religious studies, who has made contributions to the field of ancient Judaism and early Christianity through monographs, co-edited volumes, numerous articles, and his trademark synoptic editions. He was a Professor of Religion and the Ronald O. Perelman Professor of Judaic Studies at Princeton University from 1998 to 2013.

He was the director of the Jewish Museum of Berlin until June 2019 when he resigned amid criticism after a museum spokesperson issued a tweet critical of a Bundestag resolution that said the Boycott, Divestment and Sanctions movement had an antisemitic character. Subsequently, he received letters of support from 95 museum directors and curators, 445 Jewish studies scholars and 45 Talmudists.

From 1983 to 2008 he was Professor for Jewish Studies at Freie Universität Berlin. Since 1993, he has been co-editor of Jewish Studies Quarterly. Schäfer's research interests include Jewish history in late antiquity, the religion and literature of Rabbinic Judaism, Jewish mysticism, 19th- and 20th-century Wissenschaft des Judentums and Jewish magic. He is a member of both the American Academy of Arts and Sciences and the American Philosophical Society. He won the Andrew W. Mellon Foundation Distinguished Achievement Award in December 2006. In 2014 he was awarded the Dr. Leopold Lucas Prize by the Protestant Faculty of the University of Tübingen, and in 2021 the Pour le Mérite for Sciences and Arts.

Schäfer is Catholic.

== Career ==
Schäfer contends that Philo's logos was likely derived from his understanding of the "postbiblical Wisdom literature, in particular the Wisdom of Solomon."

In 2018 Schäfer was criticized for inviting a Palestinian scholar to give a lecture at the museum and giving a personal tour to the cultural director of the Iranian embassy. Iran is regularly criticized for antisemitic statements.

Schäfer became a target for anti-BDS activists when Berlin's Jewish Museum presented an exhibition "Welcome to Jerusalem", which included a Muslim narrative as part of its depiction of Jerusalem. The criticism reached a peak when the museum's spokesperson issued a tweet critical of a May 2019 Bundestag resolution that said the BDS movement had an antisemitic character. Schäfer resigned as director of the museum in June 2019 to protect it from further attacks. Regarding the criticism, he said: "The accusation of antisemitism is a club that allows one to deal a very rapid death blow, and political elements who have an interest in this used and are using it, without a doubt".

== Major books ==
Schäfer's books contribute to the understanding of classical Judaism as well as ancient Jewish and Christian relations:

- Judeophobia: Attitudes toward the Jews in the Ancient World, Harvard University Press, 1998. This has been translated into several languages.
- Mirror of His Beauty: Feminine Images of God From the Bible to the Early Kabbalah, Princeton University Press, 2002.
- The History of the Jews in the Greco-Roman World, Routledge, 2003.
- Jesus in the Talmud, Princeton University Press, 2007.
- The Origins of Jewish Mysticism, Princeton University Press, 2009.
- The Jewish Jesus: How Judaism and Christianity shaped each other, Princeton University Press, 2012.
- Two Gods in Heaven: Jewish Concepts of God in Antiquity. Princeton University Press, 2020

== Landmark synoptic editions ==
Schäfer has encouraged the study of esoteric subjects in early Judaism through the publication of synoptic editions of ancient texts. These editions collate multiple manuscripts in large-format books that allow for line by line comparison of ancient Hebrew and Aramaic texts.

- Hekhalot literature: Synopse zur Hekhalot-Literatur. Tübingen: J.C.B. Mohr, 1981.
- Jerusalem Talmud: Peter Schäfer and H.-J. Becker. Synopse zum Talmud Yerushalmi. Tübingen: Mohr Siebeck, 1991.
- Sefer Ha-Razim: Peter Schäfer and Bill Rebiger. Sefer ha-Razim. Tübingen: Mohr Siebeck, 2009.
- Toledot Yeshu: Peter Schäfer and Michael Meerson with the collaboration of Yaacov Deutsch, David Grossberg, Avigail Manekin, and Adina Yoffie. Toledot Yeshu: the Life Story of Jesus. Tübingen: Mohr Siebeck, 2014.

== Other works ==
- Peter Schäfer, Die Vorstellung vom heiligen Geist in der rabbinischen Literatur, Munich 1972
- Peter Schäfer, Rivalität zwischen Engeln und Menschen : Untersuchungen zur rabbinischen Engelvorstellung. Berlin de Gru.75.
- Peter Schäfer, Geschichte der Juden in der Antike. Die Juden Palästinas von Alexander dem Großen bis zur arabischen Eroberung, Catholic Publishers, Stuttgart, 1983 in: Journal for the Study of Judaism, Volume 14, Number 2, 1983, pp. 221–224(4)
- Peter Schäfer, Irina Wandrey: Reuchlin und seine Erben : Forscher, Denker, Ideologen und Spinner, Thorbecke 2005, ISBN 3-7995-5981-7
- Peter Schäfer and Elisabeth Müller-Luckner: Wege mystischer Gotteserfahrung: Judentum, Christentum und Islam, Oldenbourg Munich 2006, ISBN 978-3-486-58006-8
- Peter Schäfer: Jesus im Talmud, Mohr Siebeck Tübingen 2007, ISBN 978-3-16-149462-8, translated Barbara Schäfer: Jesus in the Talmud, Princeton University Press 2007, ISBN 978-0-691-12926-6
- The Bar Kokhba War Reconsidered: Archaeological, Historical, and Literary Perspectives on the Second Jewish Revolt against Rome, Tuebingen 2003
- Der Triumph der reinen Geistigkeit. Sigmund Freuds "Der Mann Moses und die monotheistische Religion", Berlin and Vienna 2003.
