= Jewish views on religious pluralism =

Religious pluralism is a set of religious world views that hold that one's religion is not the sole and exclusive source of truth, and thus recognizes that some level of truth and value exists in other religions. As such, religious pluralism goes beyond religious tolerance, which is the condition of peaceful existence between adherents of different religions or religious denominations.

Within the Jewish community there lies a common history, a shared language of prayer, a shared Bible and a shared set of rabbinic literature, thus allowing for Jews of significantly different world views to share some common values and goals.

== Classical Jewish views ==
=== General classical views on other religions ===
Traditionally, Jews believe that God chose the Jewish people to be in a unique covenant with God, described by the Torah itself, with particular obligations and responsibilities elucidated in the Oral Torah. Sometimes this choice is seen as charging the Jewish people with a specific mission: to be a light unto the nations, practice Tikkun olam and to exemplify the covenant with God as described in the Torah. This view, however, did not preclude a belief that God has a relationship with other peoples—rather, Judaism held that God had entered into a covenant with all humankind, and that Jews and non-Jews alike have a relationship with God; each nation with its own unique relationship with God.

Biblical references, as well as rabbinic literature, support this view: Moses refers to the "God of the spirits of all flesh"(Numbers 27:16), and the Tanakh (Hebrew Bible) also identifies prophets outside the community of Israel (e.g., Baalam). Based on these statements, some rabbis theorized that, in the words of Nathanel ben Fayyumi, a Yemenite Jewish theologian of the 12th century, "God permitted to every people something he forbade to others...[and] God sends a prophet to every people according to their own language."(Levine, 1907/1966) The Mishnah states that, "Humanity was produced from one man, Adam, to show God's greatness. When a man mints a coin in a press, each coin is identical. But when the King of Kings, the Holy One, blessed be He, creates people in the form of Adam not one is similar to any other" (Mishnah Sanhedrin 4:5). The Mishnah further states that anyone who kills or saves a single human life, Jewish or otherwise, has killed or saved an entire world. The Tosefta, a supplement to the Mishnah, states: "Righteous people of all nations have a share in the world to come" (Tosefta Sanhedrin 13:1; Sanhedrin 105a; also Maimonides, Mishneh Torah, Hilchot Teshuvah 3:4). The Midrash adds: "Why does the Holy One, blessed be He, love the righteous? Because righteousness is not due to inheritance or family connections... If a man wants to become a Kohen or a Levite, he cannot. Why? Because his father was neither a Kohen nor a Levite. However, if someone wants to become righteous, even if he is a gentile, he can, because righteousness is not inherited" (Numbers Rabbah 8:2).

A traditional Jewish view is that rather than being obligated to obey all 613 mitzvot, the other nations of Earth need adhere only to a common list of commandments under seven categories that God required of the children of Noah known as the Noahide laws.

According to the Talmud, the seven Noahide laws are;

1. שפיכת דמים Sh'fichat damim, to refrain from bloodshed and murder
2. דינים Dinim, to establish laws and courts of justice
3. עבודה זרה Avodah zarah, to refrain from idolatry
4. ברכת השם Birkat Hashem,, to refrain from blasphemy
5. גילוי עריות Gilui Arayot, to refrain from sexual immorality (traditionally, incest, bestiality, adultery)
6. גזל - Gezel, to refrain from theft
7. אבר מן החי Ever min ha'Chai, to refrain from eating a limb torn from a still-living animal

Any person who lives according to these laws is known as "righteous among the gentiles". Maimonides states that this refers to those who have acquired knowledge of God and act in accordance with the Noahide laws. In the 2nd century a sage in the Tosefta declared "the righteous of all nations have a share in the world to come." (Tosefta, Sanhedrin 13)

Prophets of the Bible, while they repeatedly denounced the evils of the idolatrous nations (in addition to their denouncing the Jews' sins), they never call the nations to account for their idolatrous beliefs (i.e. worshiping multiple deities), but only for their evil actions (such as human sacrifice, murder, and miscarriages of justice)..

The Jerusalem Talmud, Tractate Peah, states:

"כתיב ומשפט ורב צדקה לא יענה אין הקב"ה משהא מתן שכרן של עושה מצות בגוי"

"It is written, "Justice and abundant righteousness he does not withhold". [from here we see] God does not hold back from a non-Jew who does mitzvot.

=== Classical views on Christianity ===
Maimonides, one of Judaism's most important theologians and legal experts, explained in detail why Jesus was wrong to create Christianity and why Muhammad was wrong to create Islam; he laments the pains Jews have suffered in persecution from followers of these new faiths as they attempted to supplant Judaism (in the case of Christianity, called Supersessionism). However, Maimonides then goes on to say that both faiths can be considered a positive part of God's plan to redeem the world.

Jesus was instrumental [or, "was an instrument"] in changing the Torah and causing the world to err and serve another beside God. But it is beyond the human mind to fathom the designs of our Creator, for our ways are not God's ways, neither are our thoughts His. All these matters relating to Jesus of Nazareth, and the Ishmaelite [i.e., Muhammad] who came after him, only served to clear the way for the Jewish Messiah to prepare the whole world to worship God with one accord, as it is written 'For then will I turn to the peoples a pure language, that they all call upon the name of the Lord to serve Him with one consent.' (Zephaniah 3:9). Thus the Jewish hope, and the Torah, and the commandments have become familiar topics of conversation among those even on far isles, and among many people, uncircumcised of flesh and heart. (Maimonides, Mishneh Torah, XI.4.)

The above paragraph was often censored from many printed versions where Christian censorship was felt.

== Modern (post-Enlightenment era) Jewish views ==
=== Views on dialogue with non-Jews in general ===
Conservative, Reform, Reconstructionist, and a few Modern Orthodox rabbis engage in interfaith religious dialogue, while most Orthodox rabbis do not.

Rabbi Lord Immanuel Jakobovits, former Chief Rabbi of the United Synagogue of Great Britain, describes a commonly held Jewish view on this issue:

"Yes, I do believe in the Chosen people concept as affirmed by Judaism in its holy writ, its prayers, and its millennial tradition. In fact, I believe that every people - and indeed, in a more limited way, every individual - is "chosen" or destined for some distinct purpose in advancing the designs of Providence. Only, some fulfill their mission and others do not. Maybe the Greeks were chosen for their unique contributions to art and philosophy, the Romans for their pioneering services in law and government, the British for bringing parliamentary rule into the world, and the Americans for piloting democracy in a pluralistic society. The Jews were chosen by God to be 'peculiar unto Me' as the pioneers of religion and morality; that was and is their national purpose."

The German-Jewish philosopher Moses Mendelssohn (1729–1786) taught that "According to the basic principles of my religion I am not to seek to convert anyone not born into our laws....We believe that the other nations of the Earth are directed by God to observe only the law of nature and the religion of the Patriarchs...I fancy that whosoever leads men to virtue in this life cannot be damned in the next."

According to the Jewish Encyclopedia article on Gentile: Gentiles May Not Be Taught the Torah, Rabbi Jacob Emden (1697–1776) claimed:

... the original intention of Jesus, and especially of Paul, was to convert only the Gentiles to the seven moral laws of Noah and to let the Jews follow the Mosaic law – which explains the apparent contradictions in the New Testament regarding the laws of Moses and the Sabbath.

=== Views on Jewish-Christian dialogue ===
==== Joseph Soloveitchik ====
In practice, the predominant position of Modern Orthodoxy on this issue is based on the position of Rabbi Joseph Soloveitchik in an essay entitled Confrontation. He held that Judaism and Christianity are "two faith communities (which are) intrinsically antithetic". In his view "the language of faith of a particular community is totally incomprehensible to the man of a different faith community. Hence the confrontation should occur not at a theological, but at a mundane human level... the great encounter between man and God is a holy, personal and private affair, incomprehensible to the outsider..." As such, he ruled that theological dialogue between Judaism and Christianity was not possible.

However, Soloveitchik advocated closer ties between the Jewish and Christian communities. He held that communication between Jews and Christians was not merely permissible, but "desirable and even essential" on non-theological issues such as war and peace, the war on poverty, the struggle for people to gain freedom, issues of morality and civil rights, and to work together against the perceived threat of secularism.

As a result of his ruling, Orthodox Jewish groups did not operate in interfaith discussions between the Roman Catholic Church and Jews about Vatican II, a strictly theological endeavour. However, the Rabbinical Council of America (RCA), with Soloveitchik's approval, then engaged in a number of interfaith dialogues with both Catholic and Protestant Christian groups.

Soloveitchik understood his ruling as advising against purely theological interfaith dialogue, but as allowing theological dialogue as part of a greater context. Bernard Rosensweig (former President of the RCA) writes "The RCA remained loyal to the guidelines which the Rav [Soloveitch] had set down [concerning interfaith dialogue] and distinguished between theological discussions and ethical-secular concerns, which have universal validity. Every program involving either Catholic or Protestant churches in which we participated was carefully scrutinized.... Every topic which had possible theological nuances or implications was vetoed, and only when the Rav pronounced it to be satisfactory did we proceed to the dialogue."

An RCA committee was once reviewing possible topics for an inter-faith dialogue. One of the suggested topics was "Man in the Image of God." Several members of the committee felt that the topic had too theological a ring, and wished to veto it. When the Rav was consulted he approved the topic and quipped, "What should the topic have been? Man as a Naturalistic Creature?!"
(Lawrence Kaplan, Revisionism and the Rav: The Struggle for the Soul of Modern Orthodoxy Judaism, Summer, 1999)

The basis for Soloveitchik's ruling was not narrowly legal, but sociological and historical. He described the traditional Jewish–Christian relationship as one of "the few and weak vis-à-vis the many and the strong", one in which the Christian community historically denied the right of the Jewish community to believe and live in their own way. His response was written in the light of past Jewish-Christian religious disputations, which traditionally had been forced upon the Jewish community. Those had as their express goal the conversion of Jews to Christianity. As recently as the 1960s many traditional Jews still looked upon all interfaith dialogue with suspicion, fearing that conversion may be an ulterior motive. This was a reasonable belief, given that many Catholics and most Protestants at the time in fact held this position. Reflecting this stance, Rabbi Soloveitchik asked the Christian community to respect "the right of the community of the few to live, create and worship in its own way, in freedom and with dignity."

==== Other rabbinical views ====
Many traditional rabbis agree; they hold that while cooperation with the Christian community is of importance, theological dialogue is unnecessary, or even misguided. Rabbi Eliezer Berkovits writes that "Judaism is Judaism because it rejects Christianity, and Christianity is Christianity because it rejects Judaism." (Disputation and Dialogue: Readings in the Jewish Christian Encounter, Ed. F.E. Talmage, Ktav, 1975, p. 291.)

In later years Solovetichik's qualified permission was interpreted more and more restrictively. (Tradition:A Journal of Orthodox Thought, Vol. 6, 1964) Today many Orthodox rabbis use Soloveitchik's letter to justify having no discussion or joint efforts with Christians.

In contrast, some Modern Orthodox rabbis such as Eugene Korn and David Hartman hold that in some cases, the primary issue in Confrontation is no longer valid; some Christian groups no longer attempt to use interfaith dialogue to convert Jews to Christianity. They believe that the relationship between Judaism and Christianity has reached a point where Jews can trust Christian groups to respect them as equals. Further, in most nations it is not possible for Jews to be forced or pressured to convert, and many major Christian groups no longer teach that the Jews who refuse to convert are damned to hell.

In non-Orthodox denominations of Judaism most rabbis hold that Jews have nothing to fear from engaging in theological dialogue, and may have much to gain. Some hold that in practice Soloveitchik's distinctions are not viable, for any group that has sustained discussion and participation on moral issues will implicitly involve theological discourse. Thus, since informal implicit theological dialogue will occur, one might as well admit it and publicly work on formal theological dialogue.

==== Orthodox Rabbinic Statement on Christianity ====
On December 3, 2015, the Center for Jewish-Christian Understanding and Cooperation (CJCUC) spearheaded a petition of orthodox rabbis from around the world calling for increased partnership between Jews and Christians. The unprecedented Orthodox Rabbinic Statement on Christianity, entitled "To Do the Will of Our Father in Heaven: Toward a Partnership between Jews and Christians", was initially signed by over 25 prominent Orthodox rabbis in Israel, United States and Europe and now has over 60 signatories.

==== Between Jerusalem and Rome ====
On August 31, 2017, representatives of the Conference of European Rabbis, the Rabbinical Council of America, and the Commission of the Chief Rabbinate of Israel issued and presented the Holy See with a statement entitled Between Jerusalem and Rome. The document pays particular tribute to the Second Vatican Council's Declaration Nostra Aetate, whose fourth chapter represents the Magna Charta of the Holy See's dialogue with the Jewish world. The Statement Between Jerusalem and Rome does not hide the theological differences that exist between the two faith traditions while all the same it expresses a firm resolve to collaborate more closely, now and in the future.

==== Ground rules for a Christian-Jewish dialogue ====
Conservative Rabbi Robert Gordis wrote an essay on "Ground Rules for a Christian Jewish Dialogue"; in all Jewish denominations, one form or another of these rules eventually became more or less accepted by parties engaging in Jewish-Christian theological dialogue.

Robert Gordis held that "a rational dialogue conducted on the basis of knowledge and mutual respect between the two components of the religio-ethical tradition of the Western world can prove a blessing to our age." His proposed ground rules for fair discussion are:

(1) People should not label Jews as worshiping an inferior "Old Testament God of Justice" while saying that Christians worship a superior "God of Love of the New Testament." Gordis gives quotations from the Tanakh (Hebrew Bible) which in his view prove that this view is a misleading caricature of both religions that was created by selective quotation. (See Marcion for the historical source of this interpretation).

(2) He holds that Christians should stop "the widespread practice of contrasting the primitivism, tribalism and formalism of the Old Testament (see also Antinomianism) with the spirituality, universalism, and freedom of the New, to the manifest disadvantage of the former." Gordis again brings forth quotations from the Tanakh which in his view prove that this is a misleading caricature of both religions, created by selective quotation.

(3) "Another practice which should be surrendered is that of referring to Old Testament verses quoted in the New as original New Testament passages. Many years ago, Bertrand Russell, a well known atheist, described the Golden Rule 'Thou shalt love thy neighbor as thyself' as New Testament teaching. When the Old Testament source (Leviticus 19:18, the Great Commandment) was called to his attention, he blandly refused to recognize his error."

(4) Christians need to understand that while Judaism is based on the Hebrew Bible, it is not identical to the religion described in it. Rather, Judaism is based on the Bible as understood through the classical works of rabbinic literature, such as the Mishnah and Talmud. Gordis writes "To describe Judaism within the framework of the Old Testament is as misleading as constructing a picture of American life in terms of the Constitution, which is, to be sure, the basic law of the land but far from coextensive with our present legal and social system."

(5) Jews must "rise above the heavy burden of historical memories which have made it difficult for them to achieve any real understanding, let alone an appreciation, of Christianity. It is not easy to wipe out the memories of centuries of persecution and massacre, all too often dedicated to the advancement of the cause of the Prince of Peace.....[It is] no easy task for Jews to divest themselves of the heavy burden of group memories from the past, which are unfortunately reinforced all too often by personal experiences in the present. Nevertheless, the effort must be made, if men are to emerge from the dark heritage of religious hatred which has embittered their mutual relationships for twenty centuries. There is need for Jews to surrender the stereotype of Christianity as being monolithic and unchanging and to recognize the ramifications of viewpoint and emphasis that constitute the multicolored spectrum of contemporary Christianity."

Gordis calls on Jews to "see in Christian doctrine an effort to apprehend the nature of the divine that is worthy of respect and understanding" and that "the dogmas of the Christian church have expressed this vision of God in terms that have proved meaningful to Christian believers through the centuries." He calls on Jews to understand with tolerance and respect the historical and religious context which led Christians to develop the concepts of the Virgin Birth, the Incarnation, the Passion, and the Resurrection, even if Jews themselves do not accept these ideas as correct. Similarly, Gordis calls on Christians to understand with tolerance and respect that Jews do not accept these beliefs, since they are in contradiction to the Jewish understanding of the unity of God. (Source: "The Root and the Branch", Chapter 4, Robert Gordis, Univ. of Chicago Press, 1962)

Recently, over 120 rabbis have signed the Dabru Emet ("Speak the Truth"), a document concerning the relationship between Judaism and Christianity. While affirming that there are substantial theological differences between the two religions, the purpose of Dabru Emet is to point out common ground. It is not an official document of any of the Jewish denominations per se, but it is representative of what many Jews feel. Dabru Emet sparked a controversy in segments of the Jewish community. Many Jews disagree with parts of it for a variety of reasons.

=== Views on Jewish-Muslim dialogue ===
Many Muslim and Jewish groups and individuals have together created projects working for peace among Israelis and Arabs, most of which have as one of their goals overcoming religious prejudice.

The viewpoint of Conservative Judaism is summarized in Emet Ve-Emunah: Statement of Principles of Conservative Judaism. This official statement holds that

"As Conservative Jews, we acknowledge without apology the many debts which Jewish religion and civilization owe to the nations of the world. We eschew triumphalism with respect to other ways of serving God. Maimonides believed that other monotheistic faiths, Christianity and Islam, serve to spread knowledge of, and devotion to, the God and the Torah of Israel throughout the world. Many modern thinkers, both Jewish and gentile, have noted that God may well have seen fit to enter covenants with many nations. Either outlook, when relating to others, is perfectly compatible with a commitment to one's own faith and pattern of religious life. If we criticize triumphalism in our own community, then real dialogue with other faith groups requires that we criticize triumphalism and other failings in those quarters as well. In the second half of the twentieth century, no relationship between Jews and Christians can be dignified or honest without facing up frankly to the centuries of prejudice, theological anathema, and persecution that have been thrust upon Jewish communities, culminating in the horrors of the Shoah (Holocaust). No relationship can be nurtured between Jews and Muslims unless it acknowledges explicitly and seeks to combat the terrible social and political effects of Muslim hostility, as well as the disturbing but growing reaction of Jewish anti-Arabism in the Land of Israel. But all of these relationships, properly pursued, can bring great blessing to the Jewish community and to the world. As the late Professor Abraham Joshua Heschel put it, "no religion is an island."

=== Views on dialogue with other religions ===
A small number of modern Jewish theologians, such as Yehezkel Kaufman and Rabbi Joseph H. Hertz, have suggested that perhaps only the Israelites were forbidden to worship idols, but perhaps such worship was permissible for members of other religions. (Yehezkel Kaufman, "The Religion of Israel", Univ. of Chicago Press, 1960; J. H. Hertz, "Pentateuch and Haftorahs" Soncino Press, 1960, p. 759). Most Jewish theologians disagree, saying that the original meaning of the text was to condemn idolatry in total. However, a growing number of Jewish theologians question whether Hindus and Buddhists today should be considered idolaters in the Biblical sense of the term. Their reasons are that modern day Buddhists, Hindus and others (a) do not literally worship "sticks and stones", as the idolaters in the Tanakh were described doing. They are well aware that icons they worship are only symbols of a deeper level of reality (though the same can be said of modern-day pagans), (b) they do not practice child sacrifice, (c) they are of high moral character, and (d) they are not anti-Jewish. Some Jews argue that God has a relationship with all gentile monotheists (or perceived monotheists), including Hindus, who in the past may have been (mis)interpreted as having a polytheist faith (see also Hindu views on monotheism), as well as with members of other religions such as Buddhism.

== Intra-religious pluralism ==
The article on Relationships between Jewish religious movements describes how the different Jewish denominations view each other and interact with each other.

== See also ==
- Religious antisemitism
- Religious pluralism
- Antisemitism in Christianity
- Christianity and Judaism
- Christian–Jewish reconciliation
- Antisemitism in Islam
- Islamic–Jewish relations
- Center for Muslim-Jewish Engagement
- Yahwism
