= 2015 in religion =

This is a timeline of events during the year 2015 which relate to religion.

== Events ==
- 7 January – Islamic terrorists carry out an attack against the Charlie Hebdo newspaper in Paris for publishing a satirical image of Muhammad. Several other Islamic terrorists carry out random attacks in the Île-de-France region over the following days.
- 15 January – Pope Francis visits the Philippines.
- 19 January – The Eritrean Catholic Church is established as a separate entity from the Ethiopian Catholic Church.
- 25 January – The Scientology documentary Going Clear premieres at Sundance, bringing scrutiny to the Church of Scientology.
- 14 February – Islamic terrorists carry out several attacks in Copenhagen, Denmark, targeting Lars Vilks at a cultural event and targeting the Great Synagogue.
- May – The Islamic State in the Greater Sahara is created by a faction of Al-Mourabitoun declaring its loyalty to the Islamic State.
- June – American conversion therapy organization JONAH is ordered to dissolve after being found to be fraudulent.
- 18 June – Laudato si' is published as an encyclical by Pope Francis.
- 27 June
  - The Dicastery for Communication is created within the Roman Curia of the Catholic Church.
  - A white supremacist gunman attacks the Emanuel African Methodist Episcopal Church in Charleston, South Carolina.
- 1 July – The First Church of Cannabis is established in Indianapolis, Indiana.
- 16 August – Our Lady of Perpetual Exemption is founded for one month by satirist John Oliver as a criticism of prosperity theology.
- 11 September – A crane collapses on a crowd preparing for the Hajj.
- 19 September – Pope Francis visits Cuba.
- 22 September – Pope Francis visits the United States.
- 23 September – The Moscow Cathedral Mosque opens in Moscow, Russia, in a ceremony attended by Vladimir Putin, Recep Tayyip Erdoğan, and Mahmoud Abbas.
- 24 September
  - The Cathedral of the Holy Martyrs is consecrated in Gyumri, Armenia.
  - A crowd crush occurs during the Hajj.
- 1 October – The Imam Ali Mosque opens in Copenhagen, Denmark.
- 3 December – The Center for Jewish–Christian Understanding and Cooperation publishes To Do the Will of Our Father in Heaven: Toward a Partnership between Jews and Christians.
- 8 December – The Catholic Extraordinary Jubilee of Mercy begins.

=== Undated ===
- The Aiyy Faith is registered in Russia.
- The Commonwealth of Pagan Communities of Siberia–Siberian Veche is registered in Russia.
- The Global Confessional and Missional Lutheran Forum is established.
- The Presbyterian Reformed Church in India is founded in South India.
- The Rodnover Confederation is founded in Poland.
