= Antisemitism in Christianity =

Some Christian churches, Christian groups, and ordinary Christians express antisemitism—as well as anti-Judaism—towards Jews and Judaism. These are examples of antisemitism by Christians or Christian communities. However, some scholars use the term "Christian antisemitism" to refer to anti-Jewish sentiments arising from Christian doctrinal or theological stances, a concept discussed by scholars such as Jules Isaac—especially in his book Jésus et Israël). The term is also used by some scholars to argue that certain forms of contempt for Jews and Judaism were historically embedded in aspects of Christian theology and practice, and as a result, the centralized institutions of Christian power (such as the Catholic Church or the Church of England), as well as governments with strong Christian influences (such as the Catholic Monarchs of Spain), have generated societal structures that have survived and perpetuate antisemitism to the present. This usage particularly appears in discussions about Christian structures of power within society—structures referred to as Christian hegemony or Christian privilege; these discussions are part of broader discussions about structural inequality and power dynamics.

Antisemitic Christian rhetoric and the resulting antipathy toward Jews and Judaism can be traced back to the earliest centuries of the Common Era and early Christianity, resembling pagan anti-Jewish attitudes that were reinforced by the belief that Jews are responsible for the crucifixion of Jesus. Christian antisemitic attitudes and beliefs about Jews also partly stem from the persecution of the earliest Christians by Pharisees during the Second Temple period, with the Pharisees often depicted in the Christian New Testament as trying to eliminate the growing group of Jewish followers of Jesus. Christians imposed ever-increasing anti-Jewish measures over the ensuing centuries, including acts of ostracism, humiliation, expropriation, violence, and murder—measures which culminated in the Holocaust.

Christian antisemitism has been attributed to numerous factors, including the fundamental theological differences that exist between the two Abrahamic religions; the competition between church and synagogue; the Christian missionary impulse; a misunderstanding of Jewish culture, beliefs, and practice; and the perception that Judaism was hostile towards Christianity. For two millennia, these attitudes were reinforced in Christian preaching, art, and popular teachings, as well as in anti-Jewish laws designed to humiliate and stigmatise Jews.

Modern antisemitism has primarily been described as hatred against Jews as a race (i.e., racial antisemitism), and the most recent expression of it is rooted in 18th-century scientific racism. Anti-Judaism is rooted in hostility towards the entire religion of Judaism; in Western Christianity, anti-Judaism effectively merged with antisemitism during the 12th century. Scholars have disagreed about the role which Christian antisemitism played in the rise of Nazi Germany, World War II, and the Holocaust. The Holocaust forced many Christians to reflect on the role(s) Christian theology and practice played—and still play in—anti-Judaism and antisemitism.

== Early differences between Christianity and Judaism ==
The legal status of Christianity and Judaism differed within the Roman Empire: because the practice of Judaism was restricted to the Jewish people and Jewish proselytes, adherents of it were generally exempt from adhering to the obligations that were imposed on adherents of other religions by the Roman imperial cult. During the reign of Julius Caesar, Judaism enjoyed the status of a "licit religion", but occasional persecutions still occurred, such as the Tiberian conscription and expulsion of Jews in 19 CE, followed by Claudius' expulsion of Jews from Rome. Christianity, however, was not an ethnoreligion like Judaism, which combined ethnic identity with religious practice. As Jewish Christians gradually faced exclusion from the early synagogal communities in the early centuries—due to increasing distinctions between Jewish and Christian communities—they were increasingly assimilated into gentile Christianity, adopting its customs and beliefs. This process also led to the loss of the protected legal status that Judaism and Jews historically enjoyed within the empire, a privilege that was limited in scope and often subject to political and social pressures, as exemplified by historical figures such as Ketia bar Shalom, Rabbi Akiva, and the Ten Martyrs, who represent different facets of Jewish suffering and resilience during these periods.

Beginning with the reign of Nero, who is said by Tacitus to have blamed the Great Fire of Rome on Christians, the practice of Christianity was criminalized and Christians were frequently persecuted; the persecution of Christians in the Roman Empire, however, differed from region to region. Comparably, Judaism suffered setbacks due to the Jewish–Roman wars, and these setbacks are remembered in the legacy of the Ten Martyrs. Robin Lane Fox traces the origin of much of the later hostility to this early period of persecution, when the Roman authorities commonly tested the faith of suspected Christians by forcing them to pay homage to the deified emperor. Jews were exempt from this requirement as long as they paid the Fiscus Judaicus, and Christians—many of whom, at the time, were of Jewish ethnicity—would say that they were Jewish but refuse to pay the tax. Their claim had to be confirmed by the local Jewish authorities, who were unlikely to accept the Christians as Jews, often leading to their execution. The Birkat haMinim was often brought forward as support for this charge that the Jews were responsible for the persecution of Christians in the Roman Empire. Systematic persecution of Christians lasted until Constantine's conversion to Christianity. In 390, Theodosius I made Christianity the state religion of the Roman Empire. While pagan cults and Manichaeism were suppressed, Judaism retained its legal status as a licit religion, but anti-Jewish violence still occurred. In the 5th century, some legal measures worsened the status of the Jews in the Roman Empire.

== Issues which Judaism has with the New Testament ==
=== Jesus as the Messiah ===
In Judaism, Jesus is not recognized as the Messiah and he is also viewed as one of many failed Jewish Messiah claimants as well as a false prophet. In Judaism, the belief is that the arrival of the prophesied Messianic Age is contingent upon the coming of the Messiah. Consequently, the comprehensive rejection of Jesus as either the Messiah or a divine figure has not been a pivotal concern within Jewish theological discourse.

=== Jewish deicide ===
Jewish deicide is the belief that to this day, the Jews will always be collectively responsible for the killing of Jesus, also known as the blood curse. Even before the Gospels were finalized, Paul possibly described the Jews as those "who killed both the Lord Jesus and the prophets" in his First Epistle to the Thessalonians 2:14–16; however, various scholars believe that these verses are a later interpolation which was not present in the original text. A justification of the deicide charge also appears in the Gospel of Matthew 27:24–25, alleging a crowd of Jews told Pilate that they and their children would be responsible for Jesus's death. The Acts of the Apostles, written by the same author as the Gospel of Luke, repeatedly reproach the Jews for having "crucified and killed" Jesus. The Gospel of John exhibits a hostile tone towards 'the Jews', particularly in verses like John 5:16, 6:52, 7:13, 8:44, 10:31, and others, which also implicate them in Jesus' death.

The belief that the Jews were Christ-killers fed Christian antisemitism and spurred on acts of violence against Jews such as pogroms, massacres of Jews during the Crusades, expulsions of the Jews from England, France, Spain, Portugal and other places, and torture during the Spanish and Portuguese Inquisitions.

Most members of the Church of Jesus Christ of Latter-day Saints accept the notion of Jewish deicide, while the Catholic Church repudiated it in 1965, as have several other Christian denominations.

=== Criticism of the Pharisees ===
Many New Testament passages criticise the Pharisees, a Jewish social movement and school of thought that flourished during the Second Temple period (516 BCE–70 CE). It has been argued that these passages shaped the way in which Christians viewed and continue to view Jews. Like most Bible passages, however, they can be interpreted in a variety of ways.

Today, mainstream Rabbinical Judaism is directly descended from the Pharisaical tradition, which Jesus frequently criticized. During Jesus's life and at the time of his execution, the Pharisees were only one of several Jewish groups, such as the Sadducees, the Zealots, and the Essenes, that mostly died out not long after the period; Jewish scholars such as Harvey Falk and Hyam Maccoby have suggested that Jesus was himself a Pharisee. In the Sermon on the Mount, for example, Jesus says, "The Pharisees sit in Moses' seat, therefore do what they say". Arguments against certain groups of Pharisees by Jesus and his disciples and Jesus's denunciations of what he saw as their hypocrisy were most likely examples of internal disputes between Jews, such disputes were common at that time (for example, see Hillel and Shammai).

=== Recent studies of antisemitism in the New Testament ===
Professor Lillian C. Freudmann, author of Antisemitism in the New Testament (University Press of America, 1994), has published a detailed study of the description of Jews in the New Testament and the historical effects that such passages have had in the Christian community throughout history. Similar studies of such verses have been made by both Christian and Jewish scholars, including Professors Clark Williamson (Christian Theological Seminary), Hyam Maccoby (The Leo Baeck Institute), Norman A. Beck (Texas Lutheran College), and Michael Berenbaum (Georgetown University). Most rabbis feel that these verses are antisemitic, and many Christian scholars in America and Europe have reached the same conclusion.

Another example is John Dominic Crossan's 1995 book, titled Who Killed Jesus? Exposing the Roots of Anti-Semitism in the Gospel Story of the Death of Jesus. Crossan writes: "The passion-resurrection stories... have been the seedbed of Christian anti-Judaism. And without that Christian anti-Judaism, lethal and genocidal European antisemitism would have been impossible or at least not widely successful. What was at stake in those passion stories in the long-haul of history, was the Holocaust."

Some biblical scholars have also been accused of holding antisemitic beliefs. Bruce J. Malina, a founding member of The Context Group, has come under criticism for going as far as to deny the Semitic ancestry of modern Israelis. He then ties it back to his work on first-century cultural anthropology.

== Church Fathers ==
After Paul's death, Christianity emerged as a separate religion, and Pauline Christianity emerged as the dominant form of Christianity, especially after Paul, James and the other apostles agreed on a compromise set of requirements. Some Christians continued to adhere to aspects of Jewish law, but they were few and often considered heretics by the Church. One example is the Ebionites, who seemed to have denied the virgin birth of Jesus, the physical Resurrection of Jesus, and most of the books that were later canonized as the New Testament. For example, the Ethiopian Orthodox continue Old Testament practices such as the Sabbath. As late as the 4th century Church Father John Chrysostom complained that some Christians were still attending Jewish synagogues. The Church Fathers identified Jews and Judaism with heresy and declared the people of Israel to be extra Deum ('outside of God').

=== Peter of Antioch ===
Peter of Antioch referred to Christians that refused to venerate religious images as having "Jewish minds".

=== Marcion of Sinope ===
In the early second century AD, the heretic Marcion of Sinope (c. 85 – c. 160 AD) declared that the Jewish God was a different God, inferior to the Christian one, and rejected the Jewish scriptures as the product of a lesser deity. Marcion's teachings, which were extremely popular, rejected Judaism not only as an incomplete revelation, but as a false one as well, but, at the same time, allowed less blame to be placed on the Jews personally for having not recognized Jesus, since, in Marcion's worldview, Jesus was not sent by the lesser Jewish God, but by the supreme Christian God, whom the Jews had no reason to recognize.

In combating Marcion, orthodox apologists conceded that Judaism was an incomplete and inferior religion to Christianity, while also defending the Jewish scriptures as canonical.

=== Tertullian ===
The Church Father Tertullian (c. 155 – c. 240 AD) had a particularly intense personal dislike towards the Jews and argued that the Gentiles had been chosen by God to replace the Jews because they were worthier and more honorable.

=== Origen ===
Origen of Alexandria (c. 184 – c. 253) was more knowledgeable about Judaism than any of the other Church Fathers, having studied Hebrew, met Rabbi Hillel the Younger, consulted and debated with Jewish scholars, and been influenced by the allegorical interpretations of Philo of Alexandria. Origen defended the canonicity of the Hebrew Bible and defended Jews of the past as having been chosen by God for their merits. Nonetheless, he condemned contemporary Jews for not understanding their own Law, insisted that Christians were the "true Israel", and blamed the Jews for the death of Christ. He did, however, maintain that Jews would eventually attain salvation in the final apocatastasis.

=== Hippolytus ===
Hippolytus of Rome (c. 170 – c. 235 AD) wrote that the Jews had "been darkened in the eyes of your soul with a darkness utter and everlasting."

=== Augustine of Hippo ===
Patristic bishops of the patristic era such as Augustine of Hippo argued that the Jews should be left alive and suffering as a perpetual reminder of their murder of Christ. Like his anti-Jewish teacher, Ambrose of Milan, he defined Jews as a special subset of those damned to hell. As "Witness People", he sanctified collective punishment for the Jewish deicide and enslavement of Jews to Catholics: "Not by bodily death, shall the ungodly race of carnal Jews perish [...] 'Scatter them abroad, take away their strength. And bring them down O Lord'". Augustine claimed to "love" the Jews but as a means to convert them to Christianity. Sometimes he identified all Jews with the evil of Judas Iscariot and developed the doctrine (together with Cyprian) that there was "no salvation outside the Church".

=== John Chrysostom ===
John Chrysostom and other church fathers went further in their condemnation; the Catholic editor Paul Harkins wrote that St. John Chrysostom's anti-Jewish theology "is no longer tenable [...] For these objectively unchristian acts, he cannot be excused, even if he is the product of his times." John Chrysostom held, as most Church Fathers did, that the sins of all Jews were communal and endless; to Chrysostom, his Jewish neighbors were the collective representation of all alleged crimes of all preexisting Jews. All Church Fathers applied the passages of the New Testament concerning the alleged advocation of the crucifixion of Christ to all Jews of their day, holding that the Jews were the ultimate evil. In citing the New Testament, he claimed that Jesus was speaking about Jews when he said, "as for these enemies of mine who did not want me to reign over them, bring them here and slay them before me."

=== Jerome ===
St. Jerome identified Jews with Judas Iscariot and the immoral use of money ("Judas is cursed, that in Judas the Jews may be accursed [...] their prayers turn into sins"). Jerome's homiletical assaults, which may have served as the basis for the anti-Jewish Good Friday liturgy, contrasts Jews with the evil, and that "the ceremonies of the Jews are harmful and deadly to Christians", whoever keeps them was doomed to the devil: "My enemies are the Jews; they have conspired in hatred against Me, crucified Me, heaped evils of all kinds upon Me, blasphemed Me."

=== Ephraim the Syrian ===
Ephraim the Syrian wrote polemics against Jews in the 4th century, including the repeated accusation that Satan dwells among them as a partner. The writings were directed at Christians who were being proselytized by Jews. Ephraim feared that they were slipping back into Judaism; thus, he portrayed the Jews as enemies of Christianity, like Satan, to emphasize the contrast between the two religions, namely, that Christianity was Godly and true and Judaism was Satanic and false. Like Chrysostom, his objective was to dissuade Christians from reverting to Judaism by emphasizing what he saw as the wickedness of the Jews and their religion.

== Middle Ages ==
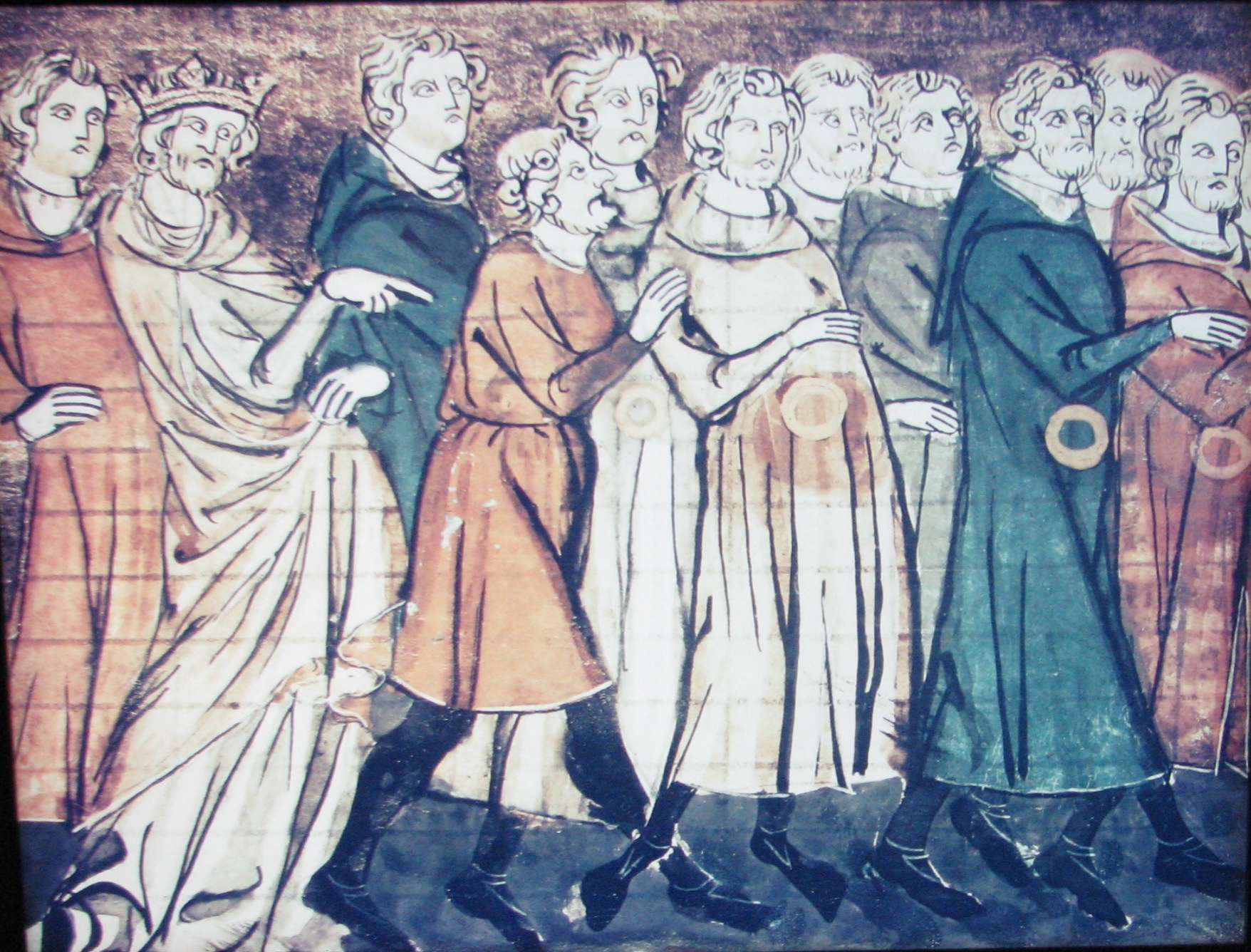
A miniature from Grandes Chroniques de France depicting the expulsion of Jews from France in 1182

Following the conversion of Spain's Visigoth royal family to Catholicism in 587, the situation for Jews deteriorated as the monarchy and church aligned to consolidate the realm under the new religion. The Church's Councils of Toledo imposed restrictions, including prohibitions on intermarriage and holding office, culminating in King Sisebut's 613 decree demanding conversion or expulsion, which led many Jews to flee or convert. Despite brief periods of tolerance, subsequent rulers and church councils intensified persecution, banning all Jewish rites, ordering forced baptisms, seizing property, enslaving Jews (after accusations of conspiracy in 694), taking children away from Jewish parents, and imposing severe economic hardships. This relentless oppression alienated the Jewish population, causing some to welcome the Muslim invasion in 711.

In 7th century Spain, Visigoth Christian rulers and the Spanish Church's Councils of Toledo implemented policies of forced conversions and expulsions of Jews. Later in the 12th century Bernard of Clairvaux said "For us the Jews are Scripture's living words, because they remind us of what Our Lord suffered. They are not to be persecuted, killed, or even put to flight." According to Anna Sapir Abulafia, most scholars agree that Jews and Christians in Latin Christendom lived in relative peace with one another until the 13th century.

=== Massacres ===
Starting in the 11th century, the Crusades unleashed a wave of antisemitism, with attacks, massacres and forced conversions of Jews, which continued to occur throughout the Middle Ages. While Muslims of the Holy Land were the primary targets, the Crusades soon expanded to other perceived enemies of Christianity inside Europe - pagans (Northern Crusades) and heretics (Albigensian Crusade). Jews become targets of the Crusaders, due to their being viewed as "enemies of God", responsible for Christ's crucifixion.

The participants of the People's Crusade perpetrated the Rhineland massacres of Jews in 1096, while the Second Crusade led to massacres in France. The gathering for the Third Crusade in 1189-1190 brought about massacres of Jews in London, Northampton and York Further massacres followed in Franconia (1298), and in France in 1320 as part of the Shepherds' Crusade. The 1391 massacres of Jews in Spain, proved to be especially deadly, forcing many to convert. A prime mover of the violence in Spain was Archdeacon Ferrand Martinez, who called for the persecution of the Jews in his homilies and speeches, claiming that he was obeying God's commandment. In Austria in 1420 all Jews were arrested and jailed, with 200 burned alive on the pyre.

=== Expulsions ===
Beyond massacres, Jews were repeatedly expelled from Europe. In 1290, King Edward I expelled all Jews from England; they were not permitted to return until 1656. Similar expulsions followed in France in 1306, Switzerland in 1348 and Germany in 1394, In 1492 the Catholic King and Queen of Spain, gave Jews the choice of either baptism or expulsion, as a result more than 160,000 Jews were expelled. Jews were only allowed officially back into Spain in 1868 with the establishment of a constitutional monarchy that allowed for the practice of faiths other than Catholicism, however, the ability to practice Judaism wasn't fully restored until 1968, when the edict of expulsion was formally repealed. The most common reasons given for these banishments were the need for religious purity, protection of Christian citizens from Jewish money lending, or pressure from other citizens who hoped to profit from the Jews' absence.

=== Other forms of discrimination ===
Jews were subjected to a wide range of legal disabilities and restrictions in medieval Europe. Jews were excluded from many trades, the occupations varying with place and time, and determined by the influence of various non-Jewish competing interests. Often Jews were barred from all occupations but money-lending and peddling, with even these at times forbidden. Jews' association to money lending would carry on throughout history in the stereotype of Jews being greedy and perpetuating capitalism. Another stereotype that appeared in the 12th century was the blood libel, which alleged that the Jews killed Christian boys and used their blood to make unleavened bread. Such accusations led to persecutions and killing of Jews.

In the later medieval period, the number of Jews who were permitted to reside in certain places was limited; they were concentrated in ghettos, and they were also not allowed to own land; they were forced to pay discriminatory taxes whenever they entered cities or districts other than their own. The Oath More Judaico, the form of oath required from Jewish witnesses, developed bizarre or humiliating forms in some places, e.g. in the Swabian law of the 13th century, the Jew would be required to stand on the hide of a sow or a bloody lamb.

=== Sicut Judaeis ===
Sicut Judaeis (the "Constitution for the Jews") was the official position of the papacy regarding Jews throughout the Middle Ages and later. The first papal bull was issued in about 1120 by Calixtus II, intended to protect Jews who suffered during the First Crusade, and it was reaffirmed by many popes, as late as the 15th century, but they were not always strictly upheld.

Along with other prohibitions, the bull forbade Christians from doing the following to Jews on pain of excommunication: coercing Jews to convert, harming them, taking their property, disturbing the celebration of their festivals, desecrating their cemeteries:

We decree that no Christian shall use violence to force them to be baptized, so long as they are unwilling and refuse. [...] Without the judgment of the political authority of the land, no Christian shall presume to wound them or kill them or rob them of their money or change the good customs that they have thus far enjoyed in the place where they live.

=== Papal restrictions and persecution of Jews ===
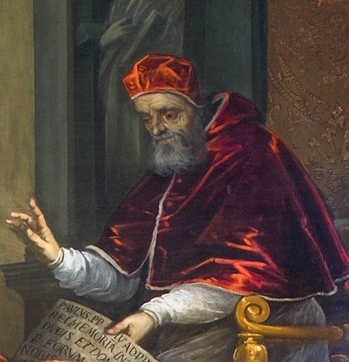
Pope Paul IV, the author of Cum nimis absurdum

While some popes offered protection to Jews, others implemented restrictive policies and actions that contributed to their marginalization and persecution. A key role was played by Pope Innocent III who justified his calls for lay and Church authorities to restrict Jewish "insolence" by claiming God made Jews slaves for rejecting and killing Christ. He proclaimed them to be the enemies of Christ, who must be kept in a position of social inferiority and prevented from exercising power over Christians.

Devaluing testimony of Jews: The Third Lateran Council, convened by Pope Alexander III in 1179, declared the testimony of Christians should be always accepted over the testimony of Jews, that those who believe the testimony of Jews should be anathemized, and that Jews should be subject to Christians. It forbade Christians serving Jews and Muslims in their homes, calling for the excommunication of those who do.

Prohibitions on holding public office. The Fourth Lateran Council, of 1215, convened by Pope Innocent III, declared: "Since it is absurd that a blasphemer of Christ exercise authority over Christians, we ... renew in this general council what the Synod of Toledo (589) wisely enacted in this matter, prohibiting Jews from being given preference in the matter of public offices, since in such capacity they are most troublesome to the Christians" These prohibitions remained in effect for centuries.

Distinctive clothing and badges: The Fourth Lateran Council required Jews to wear distinctive clothing or badges to distinguish them from Christians. The reason given for this was to enforce prohibitions against sexual intercourse between Christians and Jews and Muslims. This practice of requiring Jews to wear distinctive clothing and badges was reinforced by subsequent popes and became widespread across Europe. Such markings led to threats, extortion and violence against Jews. This requirement was only removed with the Jewish Emancipation following the Enlightenment, but the Nazis revived it. The council also forbade Jews and Muslims from appearing in public during the last three days of Easter.

Condemnations and burning of the Talmund: In 1239, Pope Gregory IX sent a letter to priest in France with accusations against the Talmud by a Franciscan. He ordered the confiscation of Jewish books while Jews were gathered in synagogue, and that all such books be "burned at the stake." Similar instructions were conveyed to the kings of France, England, Spain, and Portugal. 24 wagons of Jewish books were burned in Paris. Additional condemnations of the Talmud were issued by Popes Innocent IV in his bull of 1244, Alexander IV, John XXII in 1320, and Alexander V in 1409. Pope Eugenius IV issued a bull prohibiting Jews from studying the Talmud following the Council of Basle, 1431–43.

Spanish Inquisition: In 1478 Pope Sixtus IV issued a bull which authorized the Spanish Inquisition. This institutionalized the persecution of Jews who had converted to Christianity (conversos), due to mass violence against Jews by Catholics (e.g. the Massacre of 1391). The Inquisition employed torture and property confiscation, thousands were burned at the stake. In 1492 Jews were given the choice of either baptism or expulsion, as a result more than 160,000 Jews were expelled.

Portuguese Inquisition: In 1536 Pope Paul III established the Portuguese Inquisition with a papal bull. The major target of the Portuguese Inquisition were Jewish converts to Catholicism, who were suspected of secretly practicing Judaism. Many of these were originally Spanish Jews who had left Spain for Portugal, when Spain forced Jews to convert to Christianity or leave. The number of these victims (between 1540 and 1765) is estimated at 40,000.

Ghettos: In 1555, Pope Paul IV issued the papal bull Cum nimis absurdum, which forced Jews in the Papal States to live in ghettos. It declared "absurd" that Jews, condemned by God to slavery for their faults, had "invaded" the Papal States and were living freely among Christians. It justified restrictions by asserting that Jews were "slaves" for their deeds, while Christians were "freed" by Jesus, and that Jews should see "the true light" and convert to Catholicism. This policy was later adopted in other parts of Europe. The Roman Ghetto, established in 1555, was one of the best-known Jewish ghettos, existing until the Papal States were abolished in 1870, and Jews were no longer restricted

Forced conversions and expulsions: Some popes supported or initiated forced conversions and expulsions of Jews. For example, Pope Pius V expelled Jews from the Papal States in 1569, with the exception of Rome and Ancona. In 1593 Pope Clement VIII expelled the Jews from the Papal States with the bull, Caeca et Obdurata Hebraeorum perfidia (meaning The blind and obdurate perfidy of the Hebrews) Pope Innocent III in 1201 authorized the forced baptism of Jews in southern France, declaring that those who had been forcibly baptized must remain Christian.

Restrictions on Jewish economic activities: Various popes imposed restrictions on Jewish economic activities, limiting their professions and ability to own property. In 1555 Pope Paul IV, in his bull Cum nimis absurdum, prohibited Jews from engaging in most professions, restricting them primarily to moneylending and selling second-hand goods. This bull also forbade Jews from owning real estate and limited them to one synagogue per city. Previously the Fourth Lateran Council, sought "to protect the Christians against cruel oppression by the Jews", who extort Christians with "oppressive and immoderate" interest rates.

=== Antisemitism ===
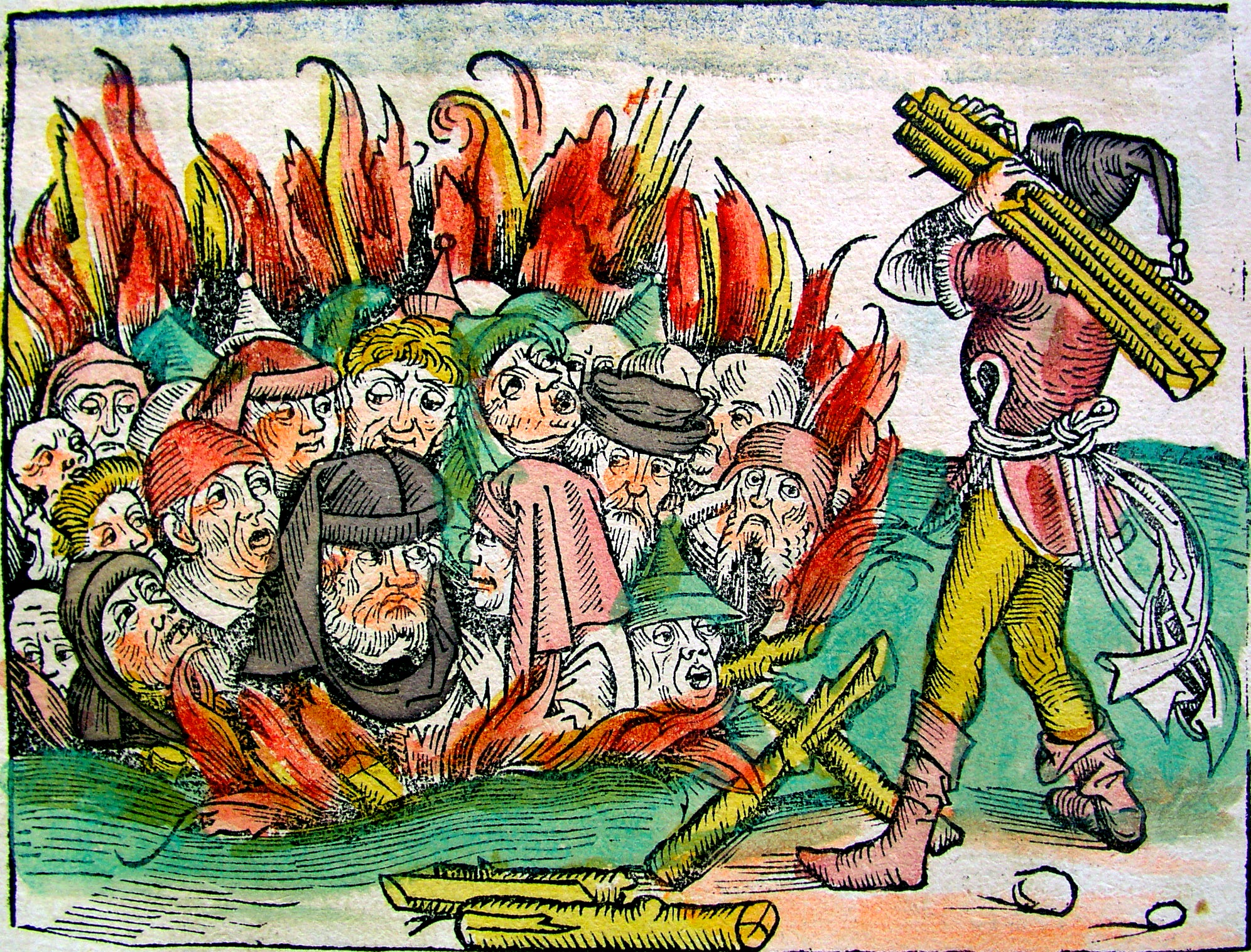
Jews burned alive for the alleged host desecration in Deggendorf, Bavaria, in 1337

Antisemitism in popular European Christian culture escalated beginning in the 13th century. Blood libels and host desecration drew popular attention and led to many cases of persecution against Jews. Many believed Jews poisoned wells to cause plagues. In the case of blood libel, it was widely believed that the Jews would kill a child before Easter and needed Christian blood to bake matzo. Throughout history, if a Christian child was murdered accusations of blood libel would arise no matter how small the Jewish population. The Church often added to the fire by portraying the dead child as a martyr who had been tortured, and who had powers like Jesus was believed to. Sometimes the children were even made into saints. Antisemitic imagery such as Judensau and Ecclesia et Synagoga recurred in Christian art and architecture. Anti-Jewish Easter holiday customs such as the Burning of Judas continue to the present time.

In Iceland, one of the hymns repeated in the days leading up to Easter includes the lines:

The righteous Law of Moses
The Jews here misapplied,
Which their deceit exposes,
Their hatred and their pride.
The judgement is the Lord's.
When by falsification
The foe makes accusation,
It's His to make awards.

=== Persecutions and expulsions ===
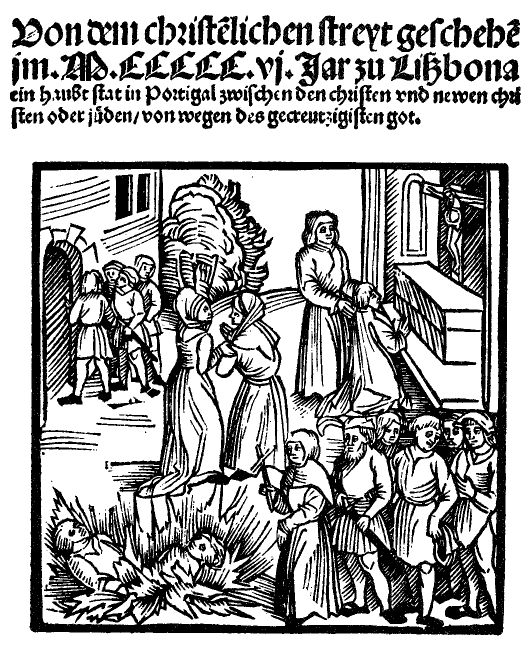
Lisbon Massacre in 1506

Expulsions of Jews in Europe from 1100 to 1600

During the Middle Ages in Europe persecutions and formal expulsions of Jews were liable to occur at intervals, and this was also the case for other minority communities, regardless of whether they were religious or ethnic. There were particular outbursts of riotous persecution during the Rhineland massacres of 1096 in Germany, these massacres coincided with the lead-up to the First Crusade, many of the killings were committed by the crusaders as they traveled to the East. There were many local expulsions from cities by local rulers and city councils. In Germany, the Holy Roman Emperor generally tried to restrain the persecution, if only for economic reasons, but it was frequently unable to exert much influence. In the Edict of Expulsion, King Edward I expelled all of the Jews from England in 1290 (after he collected ransom from 3,000 of the wealthiest Jews), based on the accusation that they were practicing usury and undermining loyalty to the dynasty. In 1306, there was a wave of persecution in France, and there were also widespread Black Death Jewish persecutions because many Christians accused the Jews of either causing or spreading the plague. As late as 1519, the Imperial city of Regensburg took advantage of the recent death of Emperor Maximilian I to expel its 500 Jews.

"Officially, the medieval Catholic church never advocated the expulsion of all of the Jews from Christendom nor did it repudiate Augustine's doctrine of Jewish witness... Still, late medieval Christendom frequently ignored its mandates".

==== Expulsion of Jews from Spain ====
The largest expulsion of Jews followed the Reconquista or the reunification of Spain, and it preceded the expulsion of the Muslims who would not convert, despite the protection of their religious rights promised by the Treaty of Granada (1491). On 31 March 1492 Ferdinand II of Aragon and Isabella I of Castile, the rulers of Spain who financed Christopher Columbus' voyage to the New World just a few months later in 1492, declared that all Jews in their territories should either convert to Christianity or leave the country.

While some converted, many others left for Portugal, France, Italy (including the Papal States), Netherlands, Poland, the Ottoman Empire, and North Africa. Many of those who had fled to Portugal were later expelled by King Manuel in 1497 or left to avoid forced conversion and persecution.

== From the Renaissance to the 17th century ==
=== Cum Nimis Absurdum ===
On 14 July 1555, Pope Paul IV issued the papal bull Cum nimis absurdum, which revoked all the rights of the Jewish community and placed religious and economic restrictions on Jews in the Papal States, renewed anti-Jewish legislation and subjected Jews to various degradations and restrictions on their freedom.

The bull established the Roman Ghetto and required Jews of Rome, which had existed as a community since before Christian times and which numbered about 2,000 at the time, to live in it. The Ghetto was a walled quarter with three gates that were locked at night. Jews were also restricted to one synagogue per city.

Paul IV's successor, Pope Pius IV, enforced the creation of other ghettos in most Italian towns, and his successor, Pope Pius V, recommended them to other bordering states.

=== Protestant Reformation ===
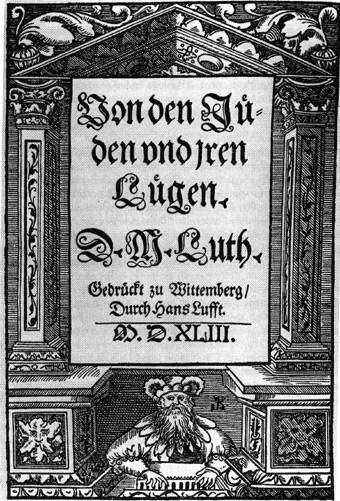
Luther's 1543 pamphlet On the Jews and Their Lies

Martin Luther at first made overtures towards the Jews, believing that the "evils" of Catholicism had prevented their conversion to Christianity. When his call to convert to his version of Christianity was unsuccessful, he became hostile to them.

In his book On the Jews and Their Lies, Luther excoriates them as "venomous beasts, vipers, disgusting scum, canders, devils incarnate." He provided detailed recommendations for a pogrom against them, calling for their permanent oppression and expulsion, writing "Their private houses must be destroyed and devastated, they could be lodged in stables. Let the magistrates burn their synagogues and let whatever escapes be covered with sand and mud. Let them be forced to work, and if this avails nothing, we will be compelled to expel them like dogs in order not to expose ourselves to incurring divine wrath and eternal damnation from the Jews and their lies." At one point he wrote: "...we are at fault in not slaying them..." a passage that "may be termed the first work of modern anti-Semitism, and a giant step forward on the road to the Holocaust."

Luther's harsh comments about the Jews are seen by many as a continuation of medieval Christian antisemitism. In his final sermon shortly before his death, however, Luther preached: "We want to treat them with Christian love and to pray for them so that they might become converted and would receive the Lord," but also in the same sermon stated that Jews were "our public enemy" and if they refused conversion were "malicious," guilty of blasphemy and would work to kill gentile believers in Christ.

== 18th century ==
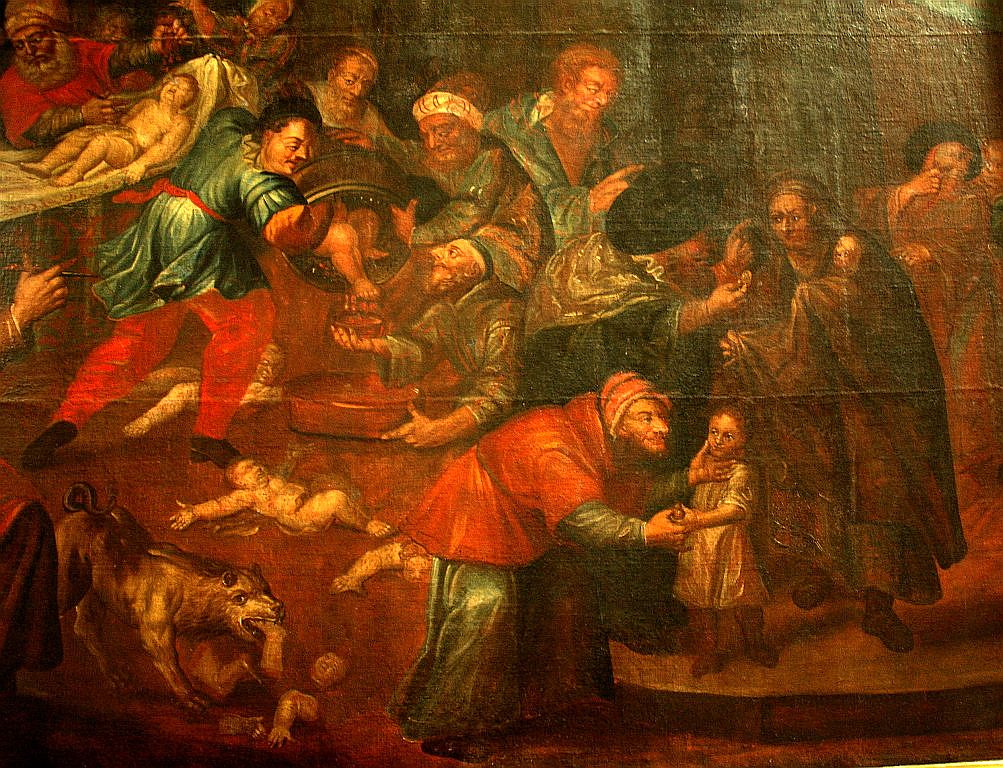
Painting in Sandomierz Cathedral, Poland, depicts Jews murdering Christian children for their blood, ~ 1750.

In accordance with the anti-Jewish precepts of the Russian Orthodox Church, Russia's discriminatory policies towards Jews intensified when the partition of Poland in the 18th century resulted, for the first time in Russian history, in the possession of land with a large Jewish population. This land was designated as the Pale of Settlement from which Jews were forbidden to migrate into the interior of Russia. In 1772 Catherine II, the empress of Russia, forced the Jews living in the Pale of Settlement to stay in their shtetls and forbade them from returning to the towns that they occupied before the partition of Poland.

== 19th century ==
Throughout the 19th century and into the 20th, the Roman Catholic Church still incorporated strong antisemitic elements, despite increasing attempts to separate anti-Judaism (opposition to the Jewish religion on religious grounds) and racial antisemitism. Brown University historian David Kertzer, working from the Vatican archive, has argued in his book The Popes Against the Jews that in the 19th and early 20th centuries the Roman Catholic Church adhered to a distinction between "good antisemitism" and "bad antisemitism". The "bad" kind promoted hatred of Jews because of their descent. This was considered un-Christian because the Christian message was intended for all of humanity regardless of ethnicity; anyone could become a Christian. The "good" kind criticized alleged Jewish conspiracies to control newspapers, banks, and other institutions, to care only about the accumulation of wealth, etc. Many Catholic bishops wrote articles criticizing Jews on such grounds, and, when they were accused of promoting hatred of Jews, they would remind people that they condemned the "bad" kind of antisemitism. Kertzer's work is not without critics. Jewish-Christian relations scholar Rabbi David G. Dalin, for example, criticized Kertzer in the Weekly Standard for using evidence selectively.

=== Opposition to the French Revolution ===
The counter-revolutionary Catholic royalist Louis de Bonald stands out among the earliest figures to explicitly call for the reversal of Jewish emancipation in the wake of the French Revolution. Bonald's attacks on the Jews are likely to have influenced Napoleon's decision to limit the civil rights of Alsatian Jews. Bonald's article Sur les juifs (1806) was one of the most venomous screeds of its era and furnished a paradigm which combined anti-liberalism, a defense of a rural society, traditional Christian antisemitism, and the identification of Jews with bankers and finance capital, which would in turn influence many subsequent right-wing reactionaries such as Roger Gougenot des Mousseaux, Charles Maurras, and Édouard Drumont, nationalists such as Maurice Barrès and Paolo Orano, and antisemitic socialists such as Alphonse Toussenel. Bonald furthermore declared that the Jews were an "alien" people, a "state within a state", and should be forced to wear a distinctive mark to more easily identify and discriminate against them.

In the 1840s, the popular counter-revolutionary Catholic journalist Louis Veuillot propagated Bonald's arguments against the Jewish "financial aristocracy" along with vicious attacks against the Talmud and the Jews as a "deicidal people" driven by hatred to "enslave" Christians. Gougenot des Mousseaux's Le Juif, le judaïsme et la judaïsation des peuples chrétiens (1869) has been called a "Bible of modern anti-Semitism" and was translated into German by Nazi ideologue Alfred Rosenberg. Between 1882 and 1886 alone, French priests published twenty antisemitic books blaming France's ills on the Jews and urging the government to consign them back to the ghettos, expel them, or hang them from the gallows.

In Italy, the Jesuit priest Antonio Bresciani's highly popular novel 1850 novel L'Ebreo di Verona (The Jew of Verona) shaped religious antisemitism for decades, as did his work for La Civiltà Cattolica, which he helped launch.

Pope Pius VII (1800–1823) had the walls of the Jewish ghetto in Rome rebuilt after the Jews were emancipated by Napoleon, and Jews were restricted to the ghetto through the end of the Papal States in 1870. Official Catholic organizations, such as the Jesuits, banned candidates "who are descended from the Jewish race unless it is clear that their father, grandfather, and great-grandfather have belonged to the Catholic Church" until 1946.

== 20th century ==
In Russia, under the Tsarist regime, antisemitism intensified in the early years of the 20th century and was given official favor when the secret police forged the Protocols of the Elders of Zion, a fabricated document purported to be a transcription of a plan by Jewish elders to achieve global domination. Violence against the Jews in the Kishinev pogrom in 1903 was continued after the 1905 revolution by the activities of the Black Hundreds. The Beilis Trial of 1913 showed that it was possible to revive the blood libel accusation in Russia.

Catholic writers such as Ernest Jouin, who published the Protocols in French, seamlessly blended racial and religious antisemitism, as in his statement that "from the triple viewpoint of race, of nationality, and of religion, the Jew has become the enemy of humanity." Pope Pius XI praised Jouin for "combating our mortal [Jewish] enemy" and appointed him to high papal office as a protonotary apostolic.

=== From WWI to the eve of WWII ===
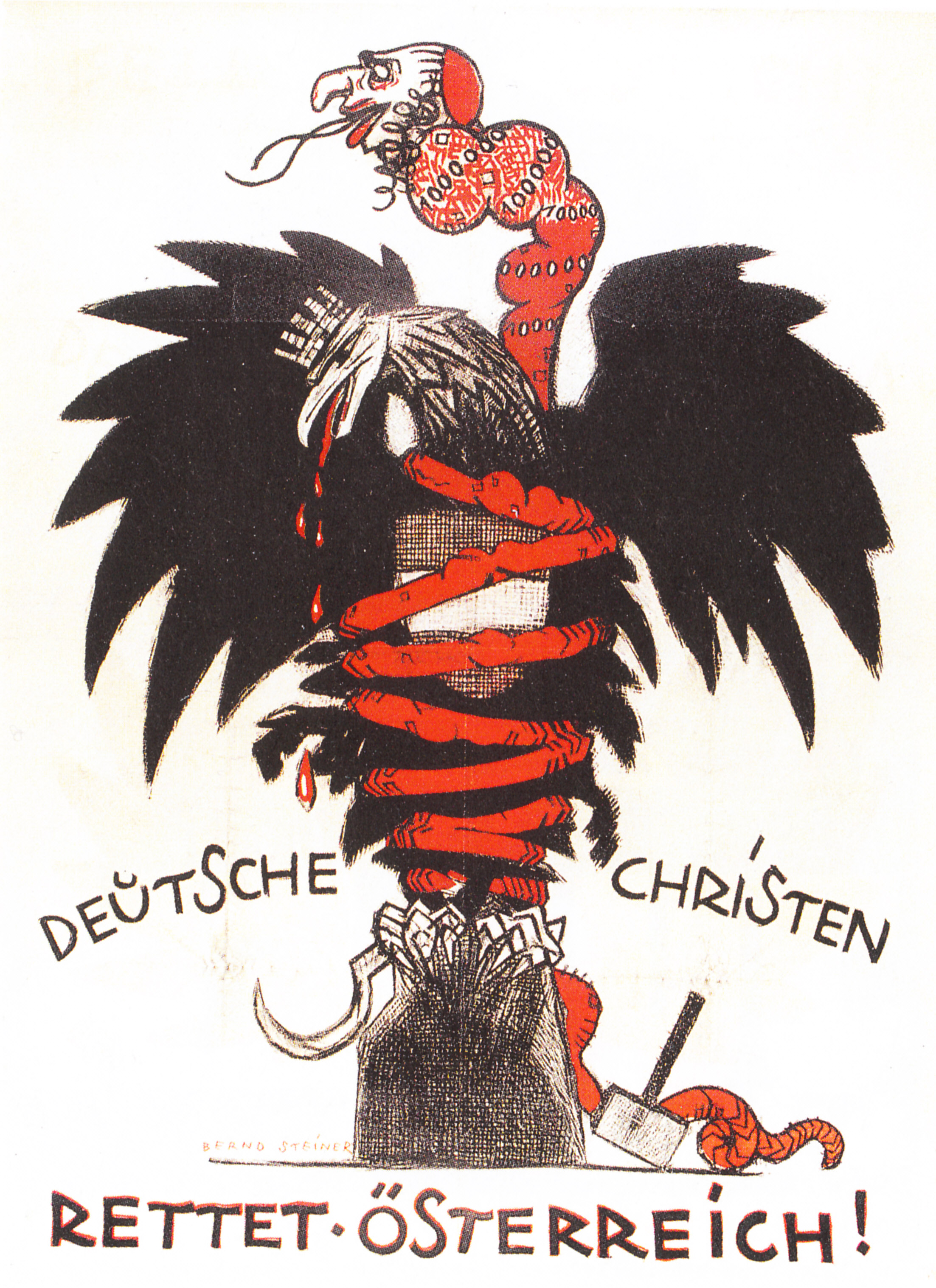
An antisemitic campaign placard used by the Christian Social Party during the 1920 elections in Austria

In 1916, in the midst of the First World War, American Jews petitioned Pope Benedict XV on behalf of the Polish Jews.

=== Nazi antisemitism ===
During a meeting with Roman Catholic Bishop Wilhelm Berning of Osnabrück On April 26, 1933, Hitler declared:

I have been attacked because of my handling of the Jewish question. The Catholic Church considered the Jews pestilent for fifteen hundred years, put them in ghettos, etc., because it recognized the Jews for what they were. In the epoch of liberalism, the danger was no longer recognized. I am moving back toward the time in which a fifteen-hundred-year-long tradition was implemented. I do not set race over religion, but I recognize the representatives of this race as pestilent for the state and for the Church, and perhaps I am thereby doing Christianity a great service by pushing them out of schools and public functions.

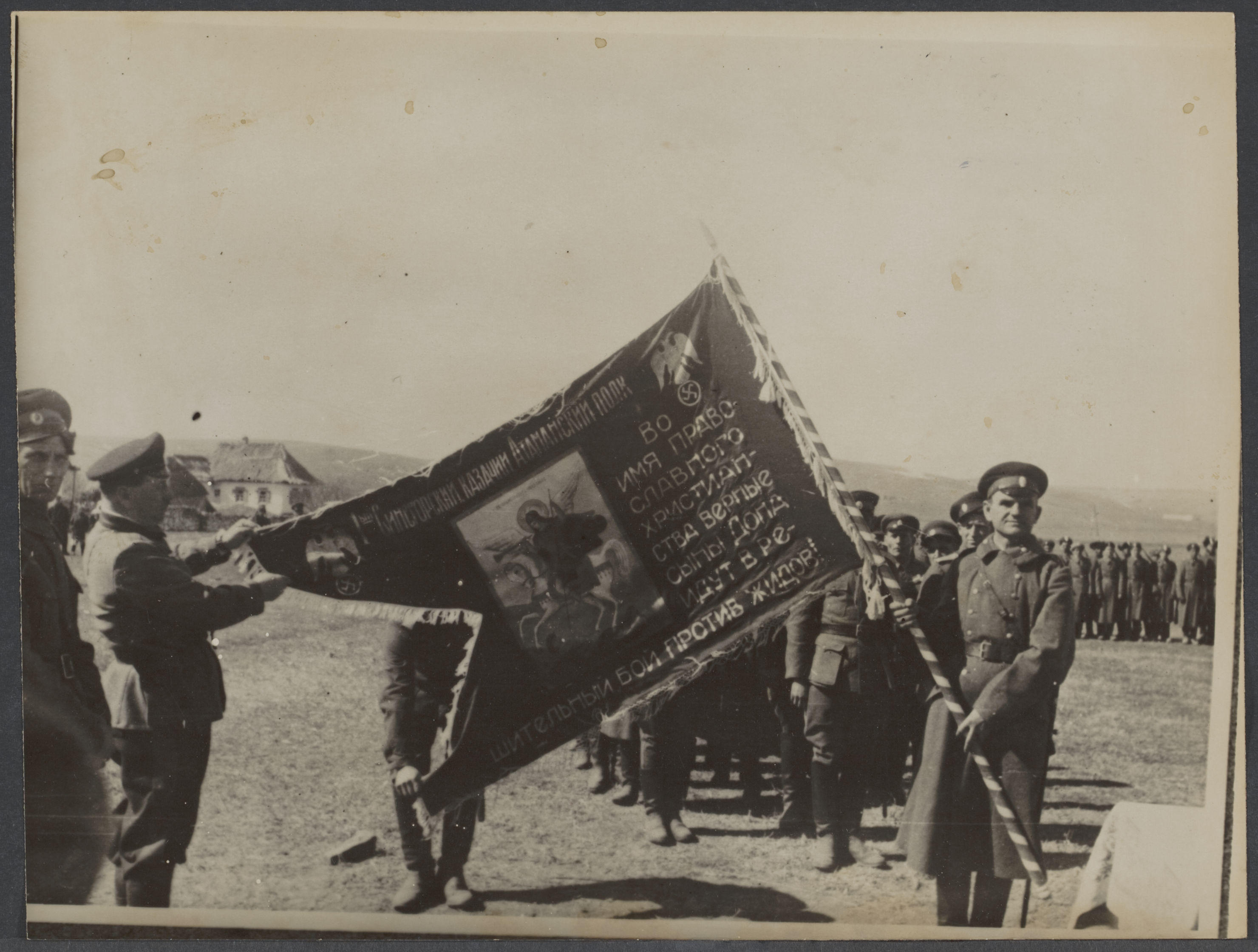
Don Cossack SS swearing-in. The flag states "in the name of Orthodox Christianity, the faithful sons of the Don go into decisive battle against the Jews!"

The transcript of the discussion does not contain any response by Bishop Berning. Martin Rhonheimer does not consider this unusual because in his opinion, for a Catholic Bishop in 1933, there was nothing particularly objectionable "in this historically correct reminder".

The Nazis used Martin Luther's book, On the Jews and Their Lies (1543), to justify their claim that their ideology was morally righteous. Luther seems to advocate the murder of Jews who refused to convert to Christianity by writing that "we are at fault in not slaying them."

Archbishop Robert Runcie asserted that: "Without centuries of Christian anti-Semitism, Hitler's passionate hatred would never have been so fervently echoed... because for centuries Christians have held Jews collectively responsible for the death of Jesus. On Good Friday in times past, Jews have cowered behind locked doors with fear of a Christian mob seeking 'revenge' for deicide. Without the poisoning of Christian minds through the centuries, the Holocaust is unthinkable." The dissident Catholic priest Hans Küng has written that "Nazi anti-Judaism was the work of godless, anti-Christian criminals. But it would not have been possible without the almost two thousand years' pre-history of 'Christian' anti-Judaism..." The consensus among historians is that Nazism as a whole was either unrelated or actively opposed to Christianity, and Hitler was strongly critical of it, although Germany remained mostly Christian during the Nazi era.

The document Dabru Emet was issued by over 220 rabbis and intellectuals from all branches of Judaism in 2000 as a statement about Jewish-Christian relations. This document states,

Nazism was not a Christian phenomenon. Without the long history of Christian anti-Judaism and Christian violence against Jews, Nazi ideology could not have taken hold nor could it have been carried out. Too many Christians participated in, or were sympathetic to, Nazi atrocities against Jews. Other Christians did not protest sufficiently against these atrocities. But Nazism itself was not an inevitable outcome of Christianity.

According to American historian Lucy Dawidowicz, antisemitism has a long history within Christianity. The line of "anti-Semitic descent" from Luther, the author of On the Jews and Their Lies, to Hitler is "easy to draw." In her The War Against the Jews, 1933–1945, she contends that Luther and Hitler were obsessed by the "demonologized universe" inhabited by Jews. Dawidowicz writes that the similarities between Luther's anti-Jewish writings and modern antisemitism are no coincidence because they derived from a common history of Judenhass, which can be traced to Haman's advice to Ahasuerus. Although modern German antisemitism also has its roots in German nationalism and the liberal revolution of 1848, Christian antisemitism she writes is a foundation that was laid by the Roman Catholic Church and "upon which Luther built."

==== Collaborating Christians ====
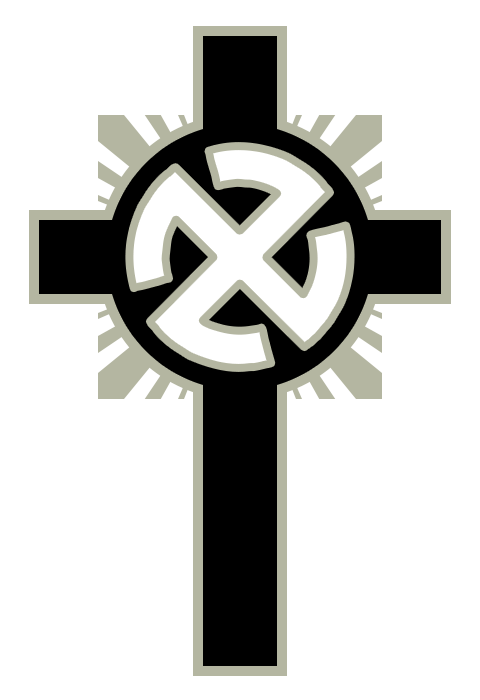
A symbol used by the German Christians movement

- German Christians movement
- Gleichschaltung
- Hanns Kerrl, Minister for Ecclesiastical Affairs
- Positive Christianity (the approved Nazi version of Christianity)
- Protestant Reich Church

==== Opposition to the Holocaust ====
The Confessing Church was, in 1934, the first Christian opposition group. The Catholic Church officially condemned the Nazi theory of racism in Germany in 1937 with the encyclical "Mit brennender Sorge", signed by Pope Pius XI, and Cardinal Michael von Faulhaber led the Catholic opposition, preaching against racism.

Many individual Christian clergy and laypeople of all denominations had to pay for their opposition with their lives, including:

- the Catholic priest Maximilian Kolbe.
- the Lutheran pastor Dietrich Bonhoeffer
- the Catholic parson of the Berlin Cathedral, Bernhard Lichtenberg.
- the mostly Catholic members of the Munich-based resistance group the White Rose which was led by Hans and Sophie Scholl.

By the 1940s, few Christians were willing to publicly oppose Nazi policy, but many Christians secretly helped save the lives of Jews. There are many sections of Israel's Holocaust Remembrance Museum, Yad Vashem, which are dedicated to honoring these "Righteous Among the Nations".

==== Pope Pius XII ====
Before he became Pope, Cardinal Pacelli addressed the International Eucharistic Congress in Budapest on 25–30 May 1938 during which he referred to the Jews "whose lips curse [Christ] and whose hearts reject him even today"; at this time antisemitic laws were in the process of being formulated in Hungary.

The 1937 encyclical Mit brennender Sorge was issued by Pope Pius XI, but it was drafted by the future Pope Pius XII and it was also read from the pulpits of all German Catholic churches, it condemned Nazi ideology and scholars have characterized it as the "first great official public document to dare to confront and criticize Nazism" and "one of the greatest such condemnations ever issued by the Vatican."

In the summer of 1942, in the presence of his college of Cardinals, Pius explained the reasons for the great gulf that existed between Jews and Christians at the theological level: "Jerusalem has responded to His call and to His grace with the same rigid blindness and stubborn ingratitude that has led it along the path of guilt to the murder of God." Historian Guido Knopp describes these comments of Pius as being "incomprehensible" at a time when "Jerusalem was being murdered by the million". This traditional adversarial relationship with Judaism would be reversed in Nostra aetate, which was issued during the Second Vatican Council starting from 1962, during the papacy of John XXIII.

Prominent members of the Jewish community have contradicted the criticisms of Pius and they have also spoken highly about his efforts to protect Jews. The Israeli historian Pinchas Lapide interviewed war survivors and concluded that Pius XII "was instrumental in saving at least 700,000, but probably as many as 860,000 Jews from certain death at Nazi hands". Some historians dispute this estimate.

=== "White Power" movement ===
In Proper Hands. The Protestant Christian-dominated KKK hinted at violence against Jews and Catholics. Illustration by Rev. Branford Clarke from Heroes of the Fiery Cross (1928), by Bishop Alma White and published by the Pillar of Fire Church in Zarephath, New Jersey.

The Christian Identity movement, the Ku Klux Klan, and other White supremacist groups have expressed antisemitic views. They claim that their antisemitism is based on purported Jewish control of the media, control of international banks, involvement in radical left-wing politics, and the Jews' promotion of multiculturalism, anti-Christian groups, liberalism and perverse organizations. They rebuke charges of racism by claiming that Jews who share their views maintain membership in their organizations. A racial belief that is common among these groups, but is not universal among them, is an alternative history doctrine concerning the descendants of the Lost Tribes of Israel. In some of its forms, this doctrine absolutely denies the view that modern Jews have any ethnic connection to the Israel of the Bible. Instead, according to extreme forms of this doctrine, the true Israelites and the true humans are the members of the Adamic (white) race. Mainstream Christian denominations and the majority of Christians around the world reject these groups based on their belief that these groups are not Christian.

=== Post World War II antisemitism ===
Antisemitism remains a substantial problem in Europe and to a greater or lesser degree, it also exists in many other nations, including Eastern Europe and the former Soviet Union, and tensions between some Muslim immigrants and Jews have increased across Europe. The US State Department reports that antisemitism has increased dramatically in Europe and Eurasia since 2000.

While it has been on the decline since the 1940s, a measurable amount of antisemitism still exists in the United States, although acts of violence are rare. For example, the influential Evangelical preacher Billy Graham and the then-president Richard Nixon were caught on tape in the early 1970s while they were discussing matters like how to address the Jews' control of the American media. This belief in Jewish conspiracies and domination of the media was similar to those of Graham's former mentors: William Bell Riley chose Graham to succeed him as the second president of Northwestern Bible and Missionary Training School and evangelist Mordecai Ham led the meetings where Graham first believed in Christ. Both held strongly antisemitic views. The 2001 survey by the Anti-Defamation League (ADL), a Jewish group which devotes its efforts to the fight against antisemitism and other forms of racism, reported 1432 acts of antisemitism in the United States that year. The figure included 877 acts of harassment, including verbal intimidation, threats, and physical assaults. Many Christian Zionists are also accused of espousing antisemitism, such as John Hagee, who argued that the Jews brought the Holocaust upon themselves by angering God.

Relations between Jews and Christians have dramatically improved since the 20th century. According to a global poll which was conducted in 2014 by the ADL, data was collected from 102 countries concerning their population's attitudes towards Jews and it revealed that only 24% of the world's Christians held views that were considered antisemitic according to the ADL's index.

== 21st century ==
In the early 21st century, antisemitic beliefs among Western Christians have undergone something of a revival due to the rise of the alt-right and related political movements. A popular podcast, Stone Choir, promotes antisemitic theories, including the belief that the Hebrew language is inherently demonic, the belief that the reading of translations of the Bible which are based on the Hebrew version of the Bible such as the Latin Vulgate should be avoided, and the belief that the reading of the Greek Septuagint should be encouraged. The podcast caters to a subculture of primarily young, white Christian men who have been nicknamed TheoBros. Other TheoBro-affiliated podcasts also promote antisemitism.

== Anti-Judaism ==
Many Christians do not consider anti-Judaism antisemitism. They believe that anti-Judaism is based on disagreements with the tenets of Judaism which are expressed by religiously sincere people, and they believe that antisemitism is an emotional bias or a feeling of hatred which is not specifically directed at the religion of Judaism. In accordance with this approach, anti-Judaism is not regarded as antisemitism because it does not involve actual hostility towards the Jewish people, instead, anti-Judaism only rejects the religious beliefs of Judaism.

Others believe that anti-Judaism is the rejection of Judaism as a religion or opposition to Judaism's beliefs and practices essentially because of their source in Judaism or because a belief or practice is adhered to by the Jewish people.

Several scholars, including Susannah Heschel, Gavin I Langmuir and Uriel Tal hold the position that anti-Judaism directly led to modern antisemitism. Pope John Paul II in "We Remember: A Reflection on the Shoah," and the Jewish declaration on Christianity, Dabru Emet opinionated the position that "Christian theological anti-Judaism is a phenomenon which is distinct from modern antisemitism, which is rooted in economic and racial thought, so that Christian teachings should not be held responsible for antisemitism".

Although some Christians believed that anti-Judaism was contrary to Christian teaching in the past, this opinion was not widely expressed by Christian leaders and lay people. In many cases, the practical practices of tolerance of the Jewish religion and tolerance of Jews prevailed. Some Christian groups condemned verbal anti-Judaism, particularly during their early histories.

== Conversion of Jews ==
Some Jewish organizations have denounced evangelistic and missionary activities that specifically target Jews by labeling them antisemitic.

The Southern Baptist Convention (SBC), the largest Protestant Christian denomination in the U.S., has explicitly rejected suggestions that it should back away from seeking to convert Jews, a position which critics have called antisemitic, but a position which Baptists believe is consistent with their view that salvation is solely found through faith in Christ. In 1996 the SBC approved a resolution calling for efforts to seek the conversion of Jews "as well as the salvation of 'every kindred and tongue and people and nation.'"

Most Evangelicals agree with the SBC's position, and some of them also support efforts that specifically seek the Jews' conversion. Additionally, these Evangelical groups are among the most pro-Israel groups. (For more information, see Christian Zionism.) One controversial group which has received a considerable amount of support from some Evangelical churches is Jews for Jesus, which claims that Jews can "complete" their Jewish faith by accepting Jesus as the Messiah.

The Presbyterian Church (USA), the United Methodist Church, and the United Church of Canada have ended their efforts to convert Jews. While Anglicans do not, as a rule, seek converts from other Christian denominations, the General Synod has affirmed that "the good news of salvation in Jesus Christ is for all and must be shared with all including people from other faiths or of no faith and that to do anything else would be to institutionalize discrimination".

The Roman Catholic Church formerly operated religious congregations that specifically aimed to convert Jews. Some of these congregations were founded by Jewish converts, like the Congregation of Our Lady of Sion, whose members were nuns and ordained priests. Many Catholic saints were specifically noted for their missionary zeal to convert Jews, such as Vincent Ferrer. After the Second Vatican Council, many missionary orders that aimed to convert Jews to Christianity no longer actively sought to missionize (or proselytize) them. However, Traditionalist Roman Catholic groups, congregations, and clergymen continue to advocate the missionizing of Jews according to traditional patterns, sometimes with success (e.g., the Society of St. Pius X which has notable Jewish converts among its faithful, many of whom have become traditionalist priests).

The Church's Ministry Among Jewish People (CMJ) is one of the ten official mission agencies of the Church of England. The Society for Distributing Hebrew Scriptures is another organization, but it is not affiliated with the established Church.

There are several prophecies concerning the conversion of the Jewish people to Christianity in the scriptures of the Church of Jesus Christ of Latter-day Saints (LDS). The Book of Mormon teaches that the Jewish people need to believe in Jesus to be gathered to Israel. The Doctrine & Covenants teaches that the Jewish people will be converted to Christianity during the second coming when Jesus appears to them and shows them his wounds. It teaches that if the Jewish people do not convert to Christianity, then the world would be cursed. Early LDS prophets, such as Brigham Young and Wildord Woodruff, taught that Jewish people could not be truly converted because of the curse which resulted from Jewish deicide. However, after the establishment of the state of Israel, many LDS members felt that it was time for the Jewish people to start converting to Mormonism. During the 1950s, the LDS Church established several missions that specifically targeted Jewish people in several cities in the United States. After the LDS church began to give the priesthood to all males regardless of race in 1978, it also started to deemphasize the importance of race concerning conversion. This led to a void of doctrinal teachings that resulted in a spectrum of views on how LDS members interpret scripture and previous teachings. According to research which was conducted by Armand Mauss, most LDS members believe that the Jewish people will need to be converted to Christianity to be forgiven for the crucifixion of Jesus Christ.

The Church of Jesus Christ of Latter-day Saints has also been criticized for baptizing deceased Jewish Holocaust victims. In 1995, in part as a result of public pressure, church leaders promised to put new policies into place that would help the church to end the practice, unless it was specifically requested or approved by the surviving spouses, children or parents of the victims. However, the practice has continued, including the baptism of the parents of Holocaust survivor and Jewish rights advocate Simon Wiesenthal.

== Reconciliation between Judaism and Christian groups ==
In recent years, there has been much to note in the way of reconciliation between some Christian groups and the Jews.

== See also ==
- Antisemitism by country
  - Antisemitism in Europe
  - Antisemitism in the United States
    - History of antisemitism in the United States
- Christianity and Judaism
- Christianity and other religions
- Christianity and violence
- Christian-Jewish reconciliation
- Christian Zionism
- History of antisemitism
- History of Christian thought on persecution and tolerance
- Jewish history
- Jewish views on religious pluralism
- Religious antisemitism

== Bibliography ==
- Rutgers, Leonard V.; Bradbury, Scott (2006). "The Diaspora, c. 235–638". In Katz, Steven T. (ed.). The Late Roman-Rabbinic Period. The Cambridge History of Judaism. Vol. 4. Cambridge University Press. ISBN 978-0-521-77248-8.
