= Joseph ha-Mashbir =

Joseph ben Samuel ha-Mashbir (Note: Also known as Joseph ben Samuel ha-Ḥazzan (Hebrew: יוסף בן שמואל החזן) and Joseph ben Samuel Rodi (Hebrew: יוסף בן שמואל רודי).) (Hebrew: יוסף בן שמואל המשביר; c. 1650 – 13 January 1700) was a Karaite ḥakham and theologian. He was born in Derazhnia, Volhynia, and moved to Halicz, Galicia in about 1670.

He was the author of Porat Yosef, on Hebrew grammar; Sheber Yosef, on religious philosophy; Birke Yosef, the subject of which is not known; a commentary on the ten Karaite articles of faith; and Ner Ḥokhmah or Perush Seder ha-Tefillah, a commentary on the prayer-book. The last-named work remained unfinished at the time of the death of the author. Joseph also composed numerous liturgical poems, which were incorporated in the Karaite prayer-book.

A funeral oration was pronounced over him by Mordecai ben Nissan, who had consulted him on the answer he was to give to Jacob Trigland about the origin of Karaism.
