= Christian–Jewish reconciliation =

Efforts to improve mutual understanding and acceptance

Christian−Jewish reconciliation refers to the efforts that are being made to improve understanding and acceptance between Christians and Jews. There has been significant progress in reconciliation in recent years, in particular by the Catholic Church, but also by other Christian groups.

== Background ==
In response to the Holocaust (though earlier accounts of reconciliation exist), and many instances of the persecution of Jews by Christians throughout history (most prominent being the Crusades and the Inquisition), many Christian theologians, religious historians and educators have sought to improve understanding of Judaism and Jewish religious practices by Christians.

There are a number of sensitive issues that continue to impact Christian–Jewish relations.

== Proselytism ==
Attempts by Christians to convert Jews to Christianity is an important issue in Christian–Jewish relations. Groups such as the Anti-Defamation League have described many attempts to convert Jews as antisemitic.

Pope Benedict XVI suggested that the church should not be targeting Jews for conversion efforts, since "Israel is in the hands of God, who will save it 'as a whole' at the proper time." A number of Progressive Christian denominations have publicly declared that they will no longer proselytize Jews. Other mainline Christian and conservative Christian churches have said they will continue their efforts to evangelize among Jews, saying that this is not antisemitic.

A 2008 survey of American Christians by the Pew Forum on Religion and Public Life found that over 60% of most denominations believe that Jews will receive eternal life after death alongside Christians.

== Roman Catholicism ==
The Second Vatican Council, commonly known as Vatican II, which closed in 1965, was instrumental in producing the document called Nostra aetate, which read in part:

True, the Jewish authorities and those who followed their lead pressed for the death of Christ; still, what happened in His passion cannot be charged against all the Jews, without distinction, then alive, nor against the Jews of today. Although the Church is the new people of God, the Jews should not be presented as rejected or accursed by God, as if this followed from the Holy Scriptures. All should see to it, then, that in catechetical work or in the preaching of the word of God they do not teach anything that does not conform to the truth of the Gospel and the spirit of Christ. Furthermore, in her rejection of every persecution against any man, the Church, mindful of the patrimony she shares with the Jews and moved not by political reasons but by the Gospel's spiritual love, decries hatred, persecutions, displays of antisemitism, directed against Jews at any time and by anyone.

To further the goal of reconciliation, the Roman Catholic Church in 1971 established an internal International Catholic-Jewish Liaison Committee and the International Jewish Committee for Interreligious Consultations. After the committee met on May 4, 2001, Church officials stated that they would change the way Judaism is dealt with in Catholic seminaries and schools.

This new understanding of the relationship between Christians and Jews is reflected in the revised liturgy of Good Friday in a particular way. The Good Friday Prayer of the Roman Rite had Catholics praying that the "perfidious Jews" might be converted to "the truth". The ancient meaning of the Latin word perfidis in that context was 'unbelieving', yet the English cognate perfidious had, over the centuries, gradually acquired the meaning of 'treacherous'. In order to eliminate misunderstanding on this point, Pope Pius XII ordered in 1955 that, in Catholic liturgical books, the Latin word perfidis be more correctly translated as 'unbelieving', ensuring that the prayer be understood in its original sense: praying for the Jews who remained "unbelieving" concerning the Messiah. The same adjective was used in many of the ancient rituals for receiving non-Christian converts into the Catholic Church.

Owing to the enduring potential for confusion and misunderstanding because of the divergence of English usage from the original Latin meaning, Pope John XXIII ordered that the Latin adjective perfidis be dropped from the Good Friday Prayer for the Jews; in 1960 he ordered it removed from all rituals for the reception of Jewish converts.

The term traditionalist Catholics is often used to apply to Catholic Christians who are particularly devoted to practicing the ancient traditions of the Church; however, there are also groups calling themselves "traditionalist Catholics" that either reject many of the changes made since Vatican II, or regard Vatican II as an invalid Council, or who broke away entirely from the Catholic Church after Vatican II. Some of these Catholics believe that the pope at the time, and all popes since, have led the majority of Catholic clergy and laity into heresy. They view interfaith dialogue with Jews as unnecessary and potentially leading to a "watering-down" of the Catholic faith.

In 2002, the Pontifical Biblical Commission released "The Jewish People and Their Sacred Scriptures". In this document, the Catholic Church further clarifies its current position on Jews and their Scriptures, taking careful steps to avoid the appearance of sanctioning any Catholic hostility toward Jews. The Commission writes, "Jewish messianic expectation is not in vain. It can become for us Christians a powerful stimulant to keep alive the eschatological dimension of our faith. Like them, we too live in expectation. The difference is that for us the One who is to come will have the traits of the Jesus who has already come and is already present and active among us." It continues, "It cannot be said, therefore, that Jews do not see what has been proclaimed in the text, but that the Christian, in the light of Christ and in the Spirit, discovers in the text an additional meaning that was hidden there."

In December 2015, the Vatican released a 10,000-word document that, among other things, implied that Jews do not need to be converted to find salvation, and that Catholics should work with Jews to fight antisemitism. The aftermath of the document's release caused intense internal debate within the Catholic Church, since it seemed to contradict the Church's teaching extra ecclesiam nulla salus ('outside the Church there is no salvation') and since in 1985 the Church had rejected dual-covenant theology. The Vatican responded by clarifying that the 2015 statement cannot be understood as a doctrinal statement containing binding Catholic teaching. The incident highlighted ongoing debate within the Catholic Church over supersessionism and the meaning of the "Old Covenant" of the Jews in relation to the New Covenant of Christ.

Pope Francis has been considered to be particularly instrumental in furthering Catholic-Jewish relations. During a visit to a synagogue, Francis echoed Pope John Paul II's statement that Jews are the "elder brothers" of Christians, and further stated: "in fact you are our brothers and sisters in faith. We all belong to one family, the family of God, who accompanies and protects us, His people."

== Protestant churches ==
While there were attempts at Protestant–Jewish dialogue throughout history, one of the most significant dialogues occurred around the 15th century; when Protestant Christian Hebraists began discovering and sympathizing with Karaite Judaism and its perceived similarities regarding scripturalism. This interest was expanded upon by Protestant attempts to parallel Karaite struggles against Rabbanite Jews to their own struggles against the Catholic Church. Christian scholar Johann Uppendorff invited Karaite spiritual leader Solomon Ben Aaron to explain the origins of the Karaites, which the latter would in his work 'Appiryon 'ash lo. Mordecai ben Nissan would write the historiographical Dod Mordekhai and Levush melkhut at the behest of Jacob Trigland and King Charles XII of Sweden respectively. Karaites, in turn, began trying to harmonize with Christian authorities. Mordecai Sultansky, in his work Zekher tzaddikim, claimed that Karaite Judaism was commended by King Baldwin I of Jerusalem, who said: "You who are loyal to Israel in your faith, and righteous in your deeds, and upright in your behavior, and have done no evil to Christians, since you were not in Jerusalem during the Second Temple period [...] it is therefore fitting that you should be present in European areas among the Christians and they will love you and give you great benefits."

In its Driebergen Declaration (1991), the European Lutheran Commission on the Church and the Jewish People rejected the historical Christian "teaching of contempt" towards Jews and Judaism, and in particular, the anti-Jewish writings of Martin Luther, and called for the reformation of church practice in the light of these insights.

== Christian Scholars Group ==
The Christian Scholars Group on Christian–Jewish Relations is a group of 22 Christian scholars, theologians, historians and clergy from six Christian Protestant denominations and the Roman Catholic Church, which works to "develop more adequate Christian theologies of the church's relationship to Judaism and the Jewish people."

== Orthodox Christianity ==
The Eastern Orthodox Church has a history of antisemitism associated with it. For example, the Protocols of the Elders of Zion were published under the aegis of Orthodox priests in Tsarist Russia. The Orthodox Christian attitude to the Jewish people is seen in the virulently antisemitic eastern Orthodox organizations which arose in the post Soviet eastern bloc.

== Joint efforts ==
The International Council of Christians and Jews (ICCJ) is an umbrella organisation of 38 national Jewish-Christian dialogue organisations worldwide, governed according to the principles of the Ten Points of the Seelisberg Conference, which was held in 1947 to explore the relationship basis of Christianity and antisemitism. The institute was founded in 1987.

In 1993 the ICCJ published Jews and Christians in Search of a Common Religious Basis for Contributing Towards a Better World. The document "contains both separate Jewish perspectives and Christian perspectives concerning mutual communication and cooperation as well as a joint view of a common religious basis for Jews and Christians to work together for a better world. [...] These considerations are not 'the' official theological, philosophical nor ideological underpinnings of the ICCJ and its member organisations, but are an invitation to consider what our work is all about. They have no authority other than their intrinsic world."

Another initiative to promote joint initiatives between Jews and Christians began in October 2002, with the establishment and approval of the bylaws of the Council of Centers of Jewish-Christian Relations. The Council is an association of centers and institutes in the United States and Canada devoted to enhancing mutual understanding between Jews and Christians. Although most of these centers or institutes are located in the United States, there are also affiliate members from Europe and Israel. Representatives from major Christian and Jewish agencies and religious bodies in the United States are also members.

== Jewish responses ==
The 1906 Jewish Encyclopedia article on "Gentile: Gentiles May Not Be Taught the Torah" notes the following Jewish-Christian reconciliation:

R. Emden, in a remarkable apology for Christianity contained in his appendix to "Seder 'Olam," gives it as his opinion that the original intention of Jesus, and especially of Paul, was to convert only the Gentiles to the seven moral laws of Noah and to let the Jews follow the Mosaic law—which explains the apparent contradictions in the New Testament regarding the laws of Moses and the Sabbath.

Robert Gordis, a Conservative rabbi, wrote an essay on Ground Rules for a Christian Jewish Dialogue; through his writings and similar writings of other rabbis in all Jewish denominations, one form or another of these rules eventually became more or less accepted by all parties engaging in interfaith dialogue.

Rabbis from all the non-Orthodox movements of Judaism became involved in inter-faith theological dialogue with a number of Christian churches. Conservative Jews and Reform Jews now commonly engage in inter-faith theological dialogue; a small number of Modern Orthodox rabbis engage in such dialogue as well.

Most Orthodox rabbis do not engage in such dialogue. The predominant position of Orthodoxy on this issue is based on the position of Rabbi Joseph Soloveitchik; he held that Judaism and Christianity are "two faith communities (which are) intrinsically antithetic". In his view "the language of faith of a particular community is totally incomprehensible to the man of a different faith community. Hence the confrontation should occur not at a theological, but at a mundane human level [...] the great encounter between man and God is a holy, personal and private affair, incomprehensible to the outsider". As such, he ruled that theological dialogue between Judaism and Christianity was not possible.

However, Rabbi Soloveitchik advocated closer ties between the Jewish and Christian communities. He held that communication between Jews and Christians was not merely permissible, but "desirable and even essential" on non-theological issues such as war and peace, the war on poverty, the struggle for people to gain freedom, issues of morality and civil rights, and to work together against the perceived threat of secularism. As a result of his ruling, Orthodox Jewish groups did not cooperate in interfaith discussions between the Catholic Church and Judaism, nor did they participate in the later interfaith dialogues between Protestant Christian groups and the Jewish community.

=== Modern papal views ===
Pope John Paul II made special effort to improve relations between Christianity (Catholicism in particular) and Jews and is often seen as a major figure in opening up dialogue between the Catholic and Jewish communities. He was the first pope to make an official visit to a synagogue, and made official apologies on behalf of the Catholic Church for wrongdoing against Jews throughout history. His theology often posed a dual-covenant quality, and referred to Judaism as "the older brother" of Christianity.

Pope Benedict XVI expressed very similar views to those of some Orthodox rabbis, saying in a 2004 book with Marcello Pera (who was, at the time, president of the Italian Senate) that inter-cultural dialogue could often be positive, but that theological dialogue was practically impossible and not always desirable.

=== National Council of Synagogues ===
The National Council of Synagogues (NCS) is a partnership of the non-Orthodox branches of Judaism. (Orthodox Jews have been invited to join, but Orthodox leaders have ruled that an Orthodox rabbi may not work with non-Orthodox rabbis as a matter of religious principle) This group deals with interfaith issues, and meets regularly with the representatives of the United States Catholic Bishops Conference, the National Council of Churches of Christ and various other denominations and religions. Their goal is to foster religious conversation and dialogue in the spirit of religious pluralism.

=== Today ===
Today the Jewish leaders are having connection with the Christian leaders.

Reflections on Covenant and Mission is a statement developed jointly by the NCS and the U.S. Bishops' Committee for Ecumenical and Interreligious Affairs.

Recently, more than 220 rabbis from all branches of Judaism signed a document called Dabru Emet ("Speak the Truth") that has since been used in Jewish education programs across the U.S.

=== Orthodox Rabbinic statement on Christianity ===
On 3 December 2015, the Center for Jewish-Christian Understanding and Cooperation (CJCUC) spearheaded a petition of Orthodox rabbis from around the world calling for increased partnership between Jews and Christians.

The unprecedented Orthodox Rabbinic Statement on Christianity, entitled To Do the Will of Our Father in Heaven: Toward a Partnership between Jews and Christians, was initially signed by over 25 prominent Orthodox rabbis in Israel, United States and Europe and now has over 60 signatories.

=== "Between Jerusalem and Rome" ===
On 31 August 2017, representatives of the Conference of European Rabbis, the Rabbinical Council of America, and the Commission of the Chief Rabbinate of Israel issued and presented the Holy See with a statement entitled "Between Jerusalem and Rome". The document pays particular tribute to the Second Vatican Council's declaration Nostra Aetate, whose fourth chapter represents the "Magna Charta" of the Holy See's dialogue with the Jewish world. The statement "Between Jerusalem and Rome" does not hide the theological differences that exist between the two faith traditions while all the same it expresses a firm resolve to collaborate more closely, now and in the future.

== Spanish and Portuguese law of return ==
On 16 December 1968, Spain formally revoked the Alhambra Decree, the 1492 edict expelling Jews from Spain.

The Spanish government has actively pursued a policy of reconciliation with the descendants of its expelled Jews. In 1992, in a ceremony marking the 500th anniversary of the Edict of Expulsion, King Juan Carlos (wearing a skullcap) prayed alongside Israeli president Chaim Herzog and members of the Jewish community in the Beth Yaacov Synagogue (Madrid, Spain). The King said that "Sefarad (the Hebrew name for Spain) is no longer nostalgia, nor a place where Jews should feel as if at home, because Hispano-Jews are home in Spain. What matters is the desire to analyse and project the past in regards to our future."

As of November 2012, Sephardic Jews have been given the right to automatic Spanish nationality without the requirement of residence in Spain. Prior to November 2012, Sephardic Jews already had the right to obtain Spanish citizenship after a reduced residency period of two years (versus ten years for foreigners). While their citizenship is being processed, Sephardic Jews will be entitled to the consular protection of the Kingdom of Spain. This made Spain the only nation aside from Israel to grant automatic citizenship to the descendants of Jews. Today, the number of Jews in Spain is estimated at 50,000. The deadline for applications under the Spanish law was September 2019, by which time 130,000 Jews had applied.

In April 2013, Portugal passed a law of return, allowing descendants of Sephardic Jews who were expelled in the inquisition to claim Portuguese citizenship provided that they "belong to a Sephardic community of Portuguese origin with ties to Portugal" without a requirement for residence. The amendment to Portugal's "Law on Nationality" was approved unanimously on 11 April 2013. The law came into effect in March 2015, and is open-ended.

== See also ==
- Anabaptist–Jewish relations
- Antisemitism in Christianity
- Center for Jewish-Christian Understanding and Cooperation
- Commonwealth Theology
- Dabru Emet
- Dual-covenant theology
- Gamaliel
- Mormonism and Judaism
- Noahide Laws
- Pope John Paul II and Judaism
- Relations between the Orthodox Church and Judaism
- Relations between the Roman Catholic Church and Judaism
- Religious pluralism
- Two House theology
- World Jewish Congress

== External links and references ==
- Jewish–Christian relations
- CCJU (The Center for Christian-Jewish Understanding of Sacred Heart University)
- The Center for Jewish-Christian Understanding and Cooperation (CJCUC)
- The Center for Catholic Jewish Studies
- Joint Vatican Buenos Aires Declaration, July 2004
- Statement by Benedict XVI Nov 2005 to Delegation From Simon Wiesenthal Center
- United Church of Canada 38th General Council of The United Church of Canada approves a milestone document on relations with Judaism
- The Context of Jewish-Christian Dialogue, by Rabbi Normon Solomon
- The Center for Jewish-Christian Learning at Boston College
- Institute for Christian & Jewish Studies
- Center for Catholic-Jewish Studies
- Reflections on Covenant and Mission: Consultation of The National Council of Synagogues and The Bishops Committee for Ecumenical and Interreligious Affairs
- Commission on Interreligious Affairs of Reform Judaism
- Statement on Religious Hatred November 20, 2000
- Authority after Adolph Eichmann and the Endlösung / Final Solution by Stephen Hand, TCRNews.com
- Pius XII, The Jews, and Albert Camus' Indictment by Stephen Hand, TCRNews.com
- A Dialogue Between Stephen Hand and Norman Orenstein
- Shabbat Shalom Jewish-Christian Reconciliation
- OzTorah - articles on Christian-Jewish dialogue from a rabbinic perspective
