= International Catholic–Jewish Liaison Committee =

The International Catholic–Jewish Liaison Committee (ILC) was established in Rome on 23 November 1970. Initially, it consisted of five representatives from each side and carried on its activities consistently through regular and special meetings. The coordination of initiatives was typically overseen by a joint executive committee, and the committee's membership gradually increased over time.

At the outset, the five Jewish representatives were nominated by the founding bodies of the International Jewish Committee on Interreligious Consultations (IJCIC), which was also established in 1970. The Catholic members were appointed with the approval of Pope Paul VI. The ILC's work aligns with the principles outlined in the memorandum of understanding signed in Rome during its formation. This memorandum emphasized that the relationship between Catholics and Jews is grounded in religious concerns but extends to various aspects of people's lives around the world.

One key focus highlighted in the memorandum was the combatting of Antisemitism, with an emphasis on eliminating any content in educational and liturgical materials that is offensive or inconsistent with the teachings of Nostra aetate. Additionally, the ILC is dedicated to promoting justice, peace, the fight against poverty, racism, and all forms of discrimination, and safeguarding human rights, particularly in the context of religious freedom.

The work of the ILC can be categorized into three phases. The initial phase (1971–1973) served as an experimental period and led to its official establishment a year later. The second phase primarily addressed educational topics, human rights, mission and witness, Antisemitism and The Holocaust. The third phase coincided with the establishment of diplomatic relations between the Holy See and the State of Israel on 30–31 December 1993. During this ongoing phase, the ILC has issued joint documents on various subjects, with an increased focus on practical cooperation in the social realm and combating Antisemitism.

== History ==
The International Catholic–Jewish Liaison Committee has held a number of meetings since its formation as follows:

- 8th meeting, 22–25 October 1979 in Regensburg, Germany. The discussions centred on religious freedom and education and for an ongoing dialogue on a pluralistic society.
- 15th meeting, 23–26 May 1994, 15 June 1994 in Jerusalem, Israel.
- 16th meeting, 23–26 March 1998, in Vatican City.
- 17th meeting, 1–3 May 2001, in New York City.
- 18th meeting, 5–8 July 2004, in Buenos Aires.
- 19th meeting, 4–7 November 2006, in Cape Town, South Africa.
- 22nd meeting, 13–16 October 2013, in Madrid, Spain.

== See also ==
- Christian–Jewish reconciliation
- Interfaith dialogue
