= Abraham Skorka =

Argentine biophysicist, rabbi and author

Rabbi Abraham Skorka
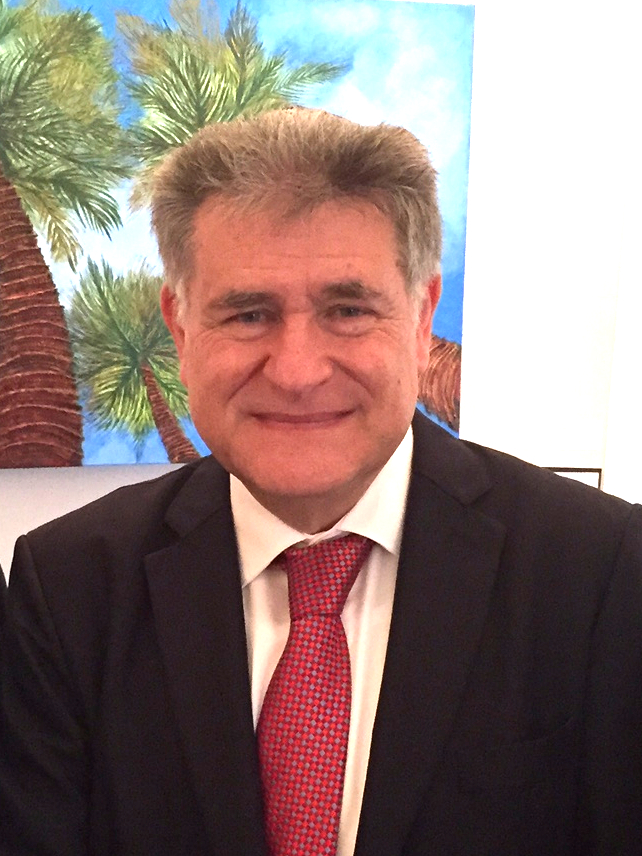
- Rabbi Abraham Skorka, January 2015

Personal life
- Born: July 5, 1950 (age 76) Buenos Aires, Argentina
- Occupation: Rector of the Seminario Rabínico Latinoamericano in Buenos Aires; Rabbi of the Jewish community Benei Tikva; Professor of biblical and rabbinic literature at the Seminario Rabínico Latinoamericano

Religious life
- Religion: Judaism
- Denomination: Conservative Judaism

Jewish leader
- Semikhah: Seminario Rabínico Latinoamericano

Abraham Skorka (born July 5, 1950) is an Argentine biophysicist, rabbi and book author. He is rector emeritus of the Seminario Rabínico Latinoamericano in Buenos Aires, the rabbi of the Jewish community Benei Tikva, professor of biblical and rabbinic literature at the Seminario Rabínico Latinoamericano and honorary professor of Hebrew Law at the Universidad del Salvador, Buenos Aires.

== Career ==
Abraham Skorka held with the Archbishop of Buenos Aires Jorge Mario Bergoglio, later Pope Francis, a series of inter-religious talks on topics such as God, fundamentalism, atheists, death, holocaust, homosexuality, and capitalism. The dialogues alternately took place at the seat of the bishop and at the Jewish Community Benei Tikva. They were published in a book titled Sobre el Cielo y la Tierra (On Heaven and Earth).

In 1973 he graduated from the Seminario Rabínico Latinoamericano with ordination as a rabbi.

In 1979 he was awarded his doctorate in Chemistry at the University of Buenos Aires. Skorka has published scientific papers in the field of biophysics and numerous articles in the field of Biblical and Talmudic research.

He received a doctorate honoris causa from the Jewish Theological Seminary of America in New York City.

In 2010 the Universidad Católica Argentina awarded him a doctorate honoris causa, the first time in Latin America that a Catholic university gave this title to a rabbi.

In May 2017, Skorka published an approbation in regards to the Orthodox Rabbinic Statement on Christianity entitled To Do the Will of Our Father in Heaven: Toward a Partnership between Jews and Christians which was published two years beforehand by the Israel-based Center for Jewish–Christian Understanding and Cooperation (CJCUC).

In 2018–2019, he serves as Visiting University Professor at the Institute for Jewish-Catholic Relations at Saint Joseph's University in Philadelphia, Pennsylvania.

On 10 May 2023, University of Trnava conferred an honorary doctorate in theology on Skorka for his "contributions to Judeo-Christian dialogue, interfaith dialogue and tolerance in science and pedagogy". Skorka was congratulated and greeted by Pope Francis on this occasions.

=== Works ===
Books

- Miles de años por semana : vision actual de la lectura de la Torah. 1997
- co-author and editor: Introducción al Derecho Hebreo. 2001, ISBN 978-9502312002
- Hacia un mañana sin fe? 2007, Ediciones Asamblea Rabinica Latinoameriana, ISBN 978-9875506374
- Jorge Mario Bergoglio, Abraham Skorka: Sobre el Cielo y la Tierra. Editorial Sudamericana, Buenos Aires 2010, ISBN 9789500732932. Translated into English as On Heaven and Earth.
- He wrote the foreword to the 2020 book, Jesus Wasn't Killed by the Jews, Orbis Books.

Cassette

- "Maimonides' Laws of Giving to the Poor", Rabbi Abraham Skorka, Rabbinical Assembly, 2000

Articles published in La Nacion (selection)

- De la muerte de Dios a la muerte de lo humano
- Diálogo profundo en un mundo inconexo
- De Fuenteovejuna a Pasteur 633
- De la cena pascual a la eucaristía
- A cuarenta años de Nostra Aetate
- Libertad e idolatría en el relato de la Pascua
- La visión de la Biblia sobre la paz
- A la sombra del golem
- Sacrificios que no acercan a Dios
- El diálogo interreligioso

Articles

Skorka, Abraham. 2023. "In Search of God: A Desperate View of the Conflicts of the Present." Spirituality Studies 9 (2): 54–59. https://www.spirituality-studies.org/dp-volume9-issue2-fall2023/54/
