= Eugene Korn =

Israeli ethicist and rabbi

Rabbi Eugene Korn
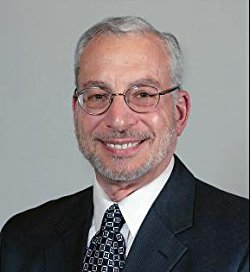
- Rabbi Eugene Korn, Phd.

Personal life
- Education: Yeshiva University; Columbia University

Religious life
- Religion: Judaism
- Denomination: Orthodox

Jewish leader
- Position: Academic Director
- Organisation: CJCUC
- Residence: Jerusalem
- Semikhah: Machon Pirchei Shoshanim (Israel)

Rabbi Doctor Eugene B. Korn (Hebrew: יוג'ין קורן; born 1947) is a lecturer, scholar and educator. He lives in Jerusalem and was formerly Academic Director of the Center for Jewish-Christian Understanding and Cooperation (CJCUC) in Jerusalem. He was also co-director of its Institute for Theological Inquiry. Korn was the founding editor of Meorot: A Forum for Modern Orthodox Discourse (successor to The Edah Journal, which he also edited), based at Yeshivat Chovevei Torah in New York City.

In 2003 he was ordained as an Orthodox rabbi by Machon Pirchei Shoshanim (Israel). He graduated with a bachelor's degree from Yeshiva University where he majored in philosophy and mathematics, and was awarded a Ph.D. in Moral Philosophy from Columbia University.

In 2003-2005 he was Director of Interfaith Affairs for the Anti-Defamation League.

His research interests include Jewish-Christian relations, Jewish ethics and Jewish Law (Halakha), Israel, and Philosophy.

In 2009, he was honored by the Catholic-Jewish Commission of Southern New Jersey and the Jewish Community Relations Council with the "Nostra Aetate Award".

In December 2015, Korn helped draft the Orthodox Rabbinic Statement on Christianity entitled "To Do the Will of Our Father in Heaven: Toward a Partnership between Jews and Christians".

His most recent books are "To Be a Holy People: Jewish Tradition and Ethical Values" (Urim Publications/KTAV Publishing House, 2021) and "Israel and the Nations: The Bible, The Rabbis, and Jewish-Gentile Relations" (Academic Studies Press, 2023). His writings has been translated into Hebrew, Italian, German and Spanish.

== Works ==
- "Israel and the Nations: The Bible, the Rabbis, and Jewish-Gentile Relations" (Academic Studies Press, 2023) ISBN 979-8887190051
- "Two Faiths, One Covenant?" (Rowman and Littlefield, 2005) ISBN 978-0742532274
- "End of Exile--Israel, the Jews, and the Gentile World, by James Parkes" (editor) (Micah, 2005) ISBN 978-0916288501
- "The Jewish Connection to Israel, the Promised Land: A Brief Introduction for Christians" (Jewish Lights, 2008) ISBN 978-1580233187
- "Jewish Theology and World Religions" (Littman Library of Jewish Civilization, 2012) ISBN 978-1906764098
- "To Be a Holy People: Jewish Tradition and Ethical Values" (Urim Publications, 2021)
- "Rethinking Christianity: Rabbinic Positions and Possibilities" in "Jewish Theology and World Religions" (Littman, 2012) ISBN 978-1906764098
- "Covenant and Hope--Christian and Jewish Reflections" (Center for Jewish-Christian Understanding and Cooperation, Eerdmans, 2012) ISBN 978-0802867049
- "Christianity in the Eyes of Judaism" [Hebrew] (American Jewish Committee, 2014)
- "Plowshares into Swords? Reflections on Religion and Violence" (Center for Jewish-Christian Understanding and Cooperation, 2014) (Kindle Edition) ASIN B00P11EGOE
- "RETURNING TO ZION: CHRISTIAN AND JEWISH PERSPECTIVES" (Center for Jewish-Christian Understanding and Cooperation, 2015) (Kindle Edition) ASIN B014J6S4NU
- "FROM CONFRONTATION TO COVENANTAL PARTNERSHIP" (Urim, Publications 2020)
- "Moralization in Jewish Law: Genocide, Divine Commands, and Rabbinic Reasoning" Edah Journal 5:2 2006
- "Tzelem Elokim and the Dialectic of Jewish Morality" Tradition 31, 2 (Spring 1997), 5–30
- "Extra Synagogum Nulla Salus?" in "Religious Perspectives on Religious Diversity" (Brill, 2017) ISBN 978-90-04-32268-4
- "The Name of God is Peace" in "Violence in Civil Society: Monotheism Guilty?" (Georg Olms Verlag, 2013) ISBN 978-3-487-15080-2
- "Idolatry and the Covenantal Pluralism of Irving Greenberg" in "A Torah Giant: The Intellectual Legacy of Rabbi Dr. Irving Greenberg (Urim, 2017) ISBN 9655242714
- "The Covenant and its Theology" in 'Meorot 9 (YCT, 2011)
- "Israel as Blessing" in "Judaism's Challenge: Election, Divine Love and Human Enmity" (Academic Studies Press, 2020)
- "How Like a God" in "Hokhma Lishlomo: Essays in Honor of Rabbi Dr. Shlomo Riskin" (Maggid 2021)
- "The Man of Faith and Religious Dialogue: Revisiting Confrontation" in Modern Judaism (2005)
- "The Open Torah of Maimonides," in "Black Fire on White Fire" (KTAV, 2016)
