= Celia Deutsch =

Celia M. Deutsch is an American religious sister, academic, educator, writer, and Old Testament scholar. She is a professor at Barnard College and serves on the Christian Scholars Group on Christian-Jewish Relations.

== Personal life ==
Deutsch was raised in the Roman Catholic faith of her mother, although her father was Jewish. She did not know her father was Jewish until she asked him a question one day and he told her: "I wasn't baptized. I'm a Jew and Jews don't baptize their children". After reading an article about the Sisters of Notre Dame of Sion, she paid them a visit in St. Louis, Missouri. She entered the order at the end of that year, after graduating from high school.

== Affiliations ==
Deutsch is active in numerous professional organizations and is a member of the Society of Biblical Literature Early Jewish and Christian Mysticism Group. She also serves as a consultant to the Interfaith Center of New York and is a member Neighbor to Neighbor (Jews, Christians, Muslims collaborating in the Flatbush/Midwood neighborhood of Brooklyn. She has worked and lectured in Canada, Italy, Israel, and Great Britain.

== Writings ==
- Deutsch, Sister Celia M., Lady Wisdom, Jesus, and the Sages: Metaphor and Social Context in Matthew's Gospel (Trinity Press, 1996)
