= On Heaven and Earth =

2010 book by Jorge Bergoglio and Abraham Skorka

- Cover of the first edition in Spanish
- Authors: Jorge Bergoglio; Abraham Skorka
- Original title: Sobre el cielo y la tierra
- Language: Spanish
- Publisher: Sudamericana
- Publication date: 2010
- Publication place: Argentina
- English publication date: 7 May 2013

On Heaven and Earth (Spanish: Sobre el cielo y la tierra) is a book that presents conversations between Argentine Cardinal Jorge Bergoglio, who later became Pope Francis, and Argentine rabbi Abraham Skorka. The book is about faith, family and the Catholic Church in the 21st century. It was first published in Spanish in 2010 and appeared in an English translation in 2013.

The book's contents received attention following Bergoglio's election to the papacy in 2013.

== Contents ==
On clerical celibacy, Bergoglio said:

For now the discipline of celibacy remains firm. Some say, with a certain pragmatism, we're losing manpower. If, hypothetically, Western Catholicism revises the issue of celibacy, I think it would be for cultural reasons (as in the East), not as a universal option. For the moment, I am in favor of maintaining celibacy, with the pros and cons it has, because there are 10 centuries of good experiences rather than failures.... It is a matter of discipline, not of faith. It can change.

Bergoglio described same-sex marriage as "a weakening of the institution of marriage, an institution that has existed for thousands of years and is 'forged according to nature and anthropology'". Bergoglio also said that there would be "affected children" by same-sex couples with adoption rights: "Every person needs a male father and a female mother that can help them shape their identity."

== See also ==
- Pope Francis and LGBT topics
