= Dabru Emet =

2000 document on Jewish-Christian relations

The Dabru Emet (Heb. דברו אמת "Speak [the] Truth") is a document concerning the relationship between Christianity and Judaism. It was signed by over 220 rabbis and intellectuals from all branches of Judaism, as individuals and not as representing any organisation or stream of Judaism.

In light of the Second Vatican Council in 1965, the Dabru Emet was first published on 10 September 2000, in The New York Times, and has since been used in Jewish education programs across the U.S. While affirming that there are theological differences between these two religions, the purpose of Dabru Emet is to point out common ground and a legitimacy of Christianity, for non-Jews, from the Jewish perspective. It is not an official document of any of the Jewish denominations per se, but it is representative of what many Jews feel. Eight major themes are expressed:

1. Jews and Christians worship the same God
2. Jews and Christians seek authority from the same book
3. Christians can respect the claim of the Jews on the land of Israel
4. Jews and Christians together accept the moral principles of the Torah (Pentateuch)
5. Nazism is not a Christian phenomenon
6. The controversy between Jews and Christians will not be settled until God redeems the entire world as promised in scripture and no-one should be pressed into believing another's belief
7. A new relationship between Jews and Christians will not weaken Jewish practice
8. Jews and Christians must work together for justice and peace

== Jewish criticism ==
There are various objections to Dabru Emet from within the Jewish community. Some hold that it understates the significant theological differences between the two religions. Thus, most Conservative and Reform rabbis have not signed it, although many do agree with most of the document. Very few Orthodox rabbis have signed it; The Institute for Public Affairs, of the Union of Orthodox Jewish Congregations (commonly known as the Orthodox Union) issued this response:

This is in many ways an admirable statement composed by people for whom I have high regard. I agree with much of it, including the controversial but carefully balanced passage denying that Nazism was a Christian phenomenon. However, I did not agree to sign it for several reasons. First, for all its exquisitely skillful formulation, it implies that Jews should reassess their view of Christianity in light of Christian reassessments of Judaism. This inclination toward theological reciprocity is fraught with danger. Second, although it is proper to emphasize that Christians "worship the God of Abraham, Isaac, and Jacob, creator of heaven and earth," it is essential to add that worship of Jesus of Nazareth as a manifestation or component of that God constitutes what Jewish law and theology call avodah zarah, or foreign worship (idolatry)—at least if done by a Jew. Many Jews died to underscore this point, and the bland assertion that "Christian worship is not a viable choice for Jews" is thoroughly inadequate. Finally, the statement discourages either community from "insisting that it has interpreted Scripture more accurately than the other." While intended for the laudable purpose of discouraging missionizing, this assertion conveys an uncomfortably relativistic message.

While agreeing with desire to encourage inter-faith dialogue and reconciliation, many Jews disagree with the section in Dabru Emet which holds that Christian theology is not in any way to blame for most of the last 2,000 years of anti-Semitism, or the Holocaust. Instead, it is believed by many Jews that much of Christian theology and teachings have been deeply anti-Semitic. Jews point to the 2,000 year history of antisemetism committed by Christians, and anti-Judaism inherent in Christian theological dogma. For instance, statements in the New Testament, such as John 8:43–47, in which Jesus speaks divisive words to some particular Jews of his day:

Because you are unable to hear what I say, you belong to your father, the devil, and you want to carry out your father's desire! He was a murderer from the beginning, not holding to the truth, for there is no truth in him! When he lies, he speaks his native language, for he is a liar and the father of lies! Yet because I tell the truth, you do not believe me. He who belongs to God hears what God says. The reason that you do not hear is that you do not belong to God.

== Orthodox Rabbis' Statement: "Christianity Is Neither Accident Nor Error" ==
On 3 December 2015, 28 Orthodox Rabbis released a statement through the Center for Jewish–Christian Understanding and Cooperation (CJCUC) in Israel. Rabbis Irving Greenberg, David Rosen, and Shlomo Riskin are prominent among them in the interfaith movement. The unprecedented declaration, entitled "To Do the Will of Our Father in Heaven: Toward a Partnership between Jews and Christians", praises “Nostra Aetate,” a Vatican document that repudiated Christian persecution against Jews. “Now that the Catholic Church has acknowledged the eternal Covenant between God and Israel, we Jews can acknowledge the ongoing constructive validity of Christianity as our partner in world redemption, without any fear that this will be exploited for missionary purposes,” it reads.

== Christian reaction ==
The European Lutheran Commission on the Church and the Jewish People (Lutherische Europäische Kommission Kirche und Judentum, LEKKJ), an umbrella organization representing twenty-five Lutheran church bodies in Europe, issued on May 12, 2003 A Response to Dabru Emet:

In its Driebergen Declaration (1991), the European Lutheran Commission on the Church and the Jewish People… rejected the traditional Christian “teaching of contempt” towards Jews and Judaism, and in particular, the anti-Jewish writings of Martin Luther, and it called for the reformation of church practice in the light of these insights. Against this background, LEKKJ welcomes the issuance of Dabru Emet: A Jewish Statement on Christians and Christianity. We see in this statement a confirmation of our own work of these past years… We know that we must reexamine themes in Lutheran theology that in the past have repeatedly given rise to enmity towards Jews… Fully aware that Dabru Emet is in the first instance an intra-Jewish invitation to conversation, we see in this statement also an aid to us in expressing and living out our faith in such a way that we do not denigrate Jews, but rather respect them in their otherness, and are enabled to give an account of our own identity more clearly as we scrutinize it in the light of how others see us.

== See also ==
- Christianity
- Christian–Jewish reconciliation
- Judaism
- Relations between Catholicism and Judaism
- Religious Pluralism
- Tikva Frymer-Kensky
- To Do the Will of Our Father in Heaven: Toward a Partnership between Jews and Christians
