= Caeca et Obdurata =

1593 papal bull

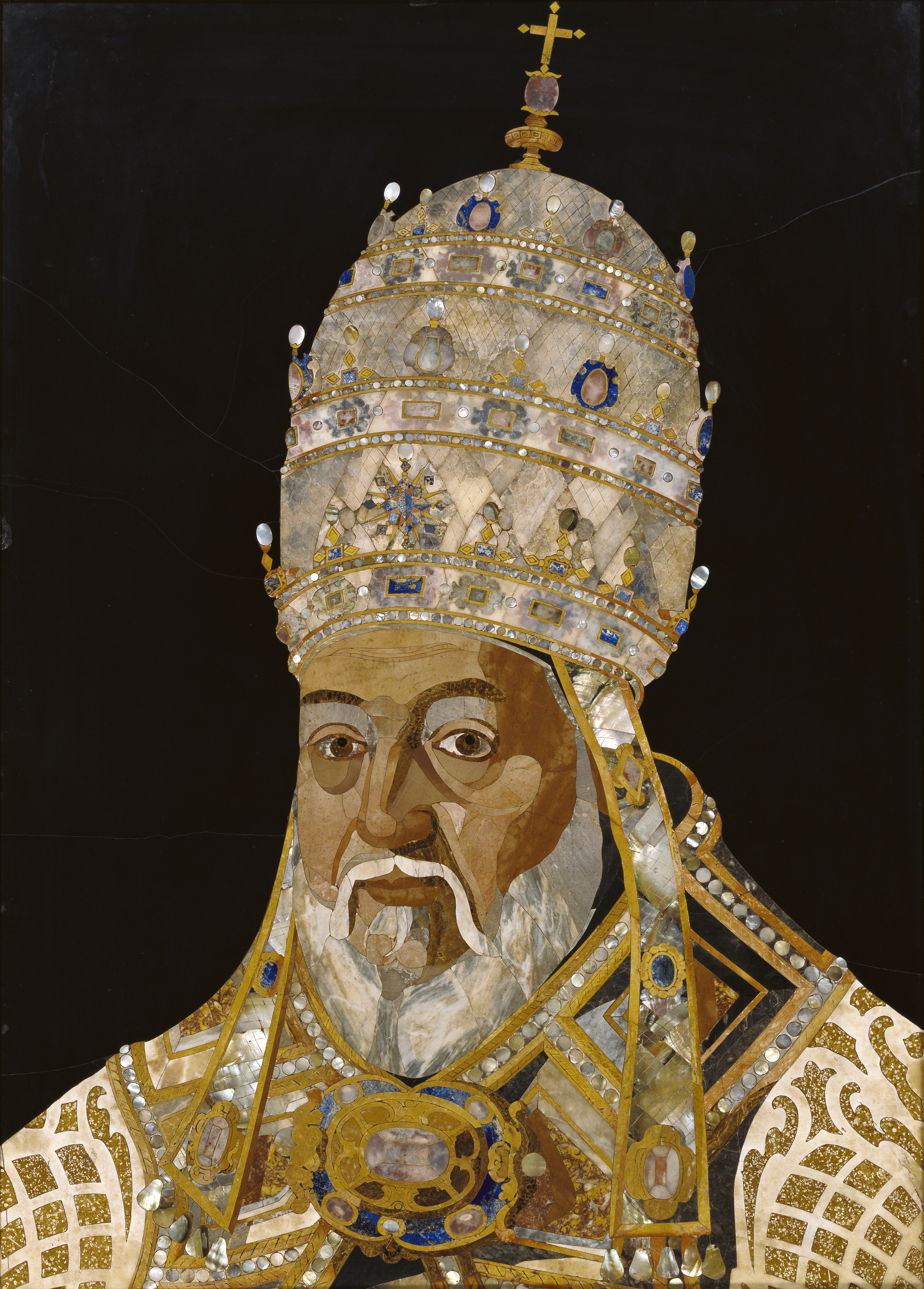
Pope Clement VIII in pietre dure by Jacopo Ligozzi

Caeca et Obdurata Hebraeorum perfidia (named for its Latin incipit, meaning the blind and obdurate perfidy of the Hebrews) was a papal bull, promulgated by Pope Clement VIII on 25 February 1593, which expelled the Jews from the Papal States, effectively revoking the bull Christiana pietas (1586) of his predecessor Pope Sixtus V. Prior to 1586, Pope Pius V's bull Hebraeorum gens sola (1569) had restricted Jews in the Papal States to Rome and Ancona.

== Content ==
The bull was a culmination of Clement VIII's tightening of the anti-Jewish measures of his predecessors which began with his elevation to the papacy in 1592. The bull gave Jews three months to leave the Papal States (with the exception of Rome, Ancona, and the Comtat Venaissin of Avignon). The main effect of the bull was to evict Jews who had returned to areas of the Papal States (mainly Umbria) after 1586 (following their expulsion in 1569) and to expel Jewish communities from cities like Bologna (which had been incorporated under papal dominion since 1569).

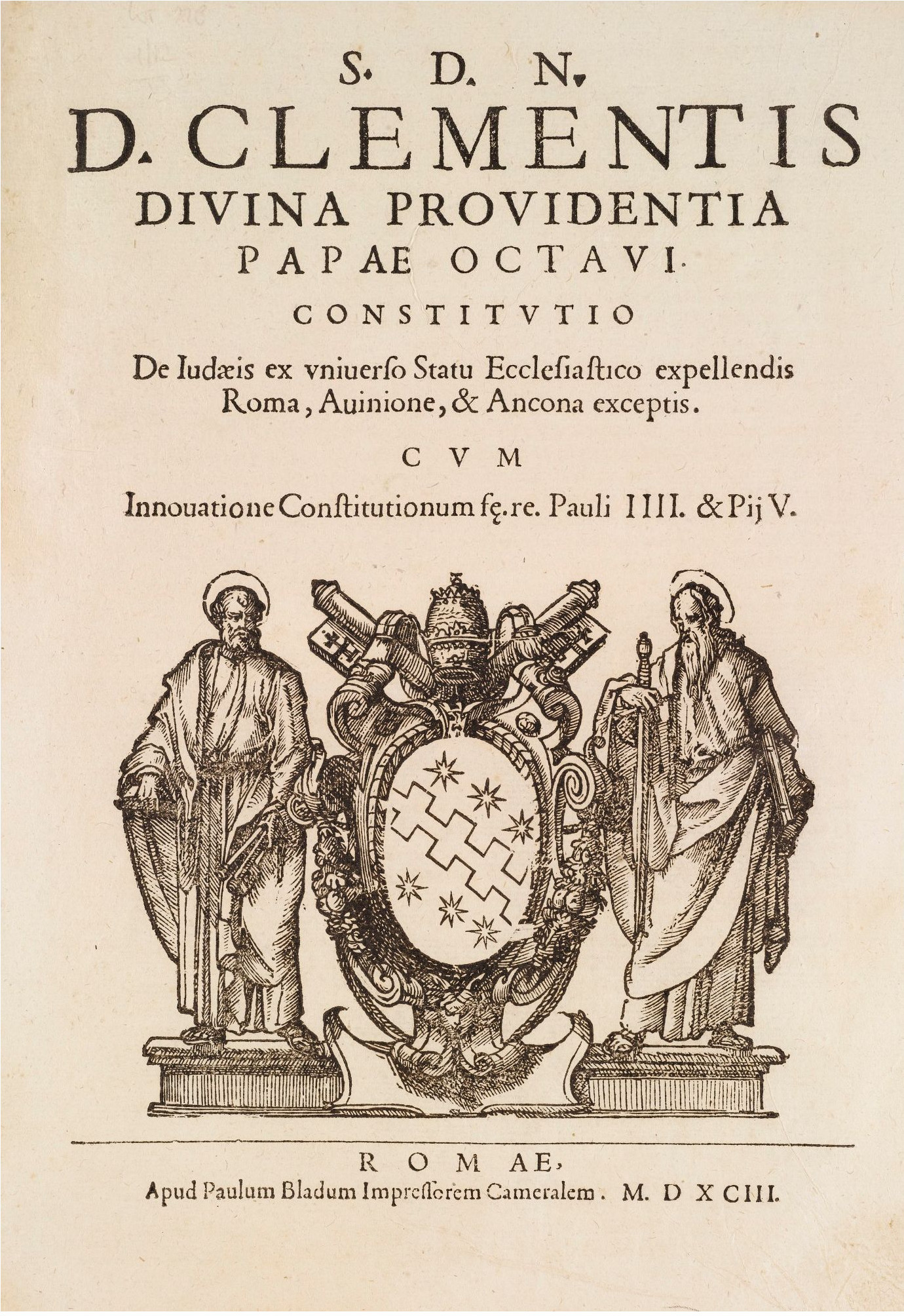
Titlepage of the printed bull

For the Jews remaining within Rome, Ancona, or the Comtat Venaissin, the bull re-established mandatory weekly proselytizing sermons. The bull also resulted in the relocation of Jewish cemeteries to Ferrara and Mantua.

The bull alleged that Jews in the Papal States had engaged in usury and exploited the hospitality of Clement VIII's predecessors "who, in order to lead them from their darkness to knowledge of the true faith, deemed it opportune to use the clemency of Christian piety towards them" (alluding to Christiana pietas).

== Aftermath ==
Three days later, on 28 February, Clement VIII promulgated Quum Hebraeorum malitia, decreeing that the Talmud should be burnt along with cabalistic works and commentaries. It gave the owners of such works 10 days to turn them over to the Universal Inquisition in Rome and subsequently two months to hand them over to local inquisitors.
