= Mordecai Sultansky =

Crimean Karaite hakham (1772–1862)

Mordecai Sultansky (Hebrew: מרדכי סולטנסקי) was a Crimean Karaite hakham of the nineteenth century.

He was born at Lutsk about 1772. Sultansky was one of the most prominent scholars of the Karaite sect during the nineteenth century. He officiated as hakham of Lutsk (in succession to his father), and later at Yevpatoria.

He wrote a Hebrew grammar entitled Petah Tikva (Yevpatoria, 1857), and Sefer Tetib Da'at (ib. 1858), directed against rabbinical philosophy and Hasidic mysticism, and endeavoring to explain Biblical angelology. He died in 1862.

Mordecai Sultansky was the first Karaite scholar claiming that Crimean Karaites have different from Rabbinic Jews origin, descending from the Ten Lost Tribes.

All Rabbanites and Karaites who live in European countries are the descendants of Abraham, Isaac and Yaakov, peace be upon them, from the tribes of Judah, Benjamin and the semi-tribe of Manasseh.

The rest of the Jews, the nine tribes and semi-tribe of Ephraim, who were expelled by the kings of Ashur, separated from the kingdom of Judah and resettled into various countries, all confess the same religion and faith as the Karaites.

The book Zekher Tzadikim - Chapter 3 - hakham Mordechai ben Josef Sultanski

== Bibliography ==
- Fürst, Bibl. Jud. iii.396;
- S. Van Straalen, Cat. Hebr. Books Brit. Mus. p. 231, London, 1894
