= To Do the Will of Our Father in Heaven =

To Do the Will of Our Father in Heaven: Toward a Partnership between Jews and Christians
- PDF copy of the document originally published on December 3, 2015
- Created: December 3, 2015; 10 years ago
- Author: Center for Jewish–Christian Understanding and Cooperation
- Signatories: Initially, 25 Orthodox rabbis in Israel, the United States, and Europe, later joined by others
- Purpose: To recognize Christianity as a willed divine outcome in human history and also the shared values of both faith communities and declare the responsibility of both faith communities to work together in partnership in order to address current moral challenges for the betterment of humankind

To Do the Will of Our Father in Heaven: Toward a Partnership between Jews and Christians is the Orthodox Rabbinic Statement on Christianity published by the Center for Jewish–Christian Understanding and Cooperation (CJCUC) in 2015. It was initially signed by over 25 prominent Orthodox rabbis in Israel, the United States, and Europe, and now has over 95 signatories.

== Historical background ==
=== The Holocaust ===
The statement cites the Holocaust (the Shoah) as the "warped climax" of centuries of disrespect, rejection and oppression of Jews. It states that this enmity weakened resistance to the evil forces of antisemitism and the ability of Jews and Christians to engage in constructive dialogue for the good of humankind.

=== Nostra aetate ===
The statement marks Nostra aetate of the Second Vatican Council, which was published 50 years beforehand in 1965, as the instigator for the process of reconciliation between Jews and Christians. In Nostra aetate the Vatican broke with 2,000 years of tradition by declaring that all Jews -- then, now, and in the future should not be condemned as "Christ killers".

== Rabbinical sources ==
The statement takes from the teachings of Maimonides and Yehuda Halevi and acknowledges Christianity as an emergence of a "willed divine outcome" in human history and as a "gift to the nations".

The document also cites from Rabbi Jacob Emden in regards to the "double goodness" that Jesus brought to the world; The strengthening of the Torah of Moses and the instilling of moral traits through the seven commandments of Noah.

The statement cites Rabbi Samson Raphael in regards to the Christian acceptance of The Old Testament as a book of Divine revelation and Rabbi Shear Yashuv in stating that Jews and Christians have a duty in perpetuating moral values which are essential for the welfare and survival of humanity.

== Jewish–Christian relations ==
The statement acknowledges that both communities have more in common with each other than divisions and adds that both the Jewish and the Christian communities, through a relationship of respect and trust, have a covenantal mission in working together towards the perfection and the redeeming of the world.

== Critical reception ==
Rabbi Shlomo Riskin stated: "The real importance of this Orthodox statement is that it calls for fraternal partnership between Jewish and Christian religious leaders, while also acknowledging the positive theological status of the Christian faith. Jews and Christians must be in the forefront of teaching basic moral values to the world."

Rabbi Irving Greenberg stated: "We understand that there is room in traditional Judaism to see Christianity as part of God's covenantal plan for humanity, as a development out of Judaism that was willed by God."

In May 2017, the statement was approbated by Rabbi Abraham Skorka of Argentina and Cardinal Christoph Schönborn Archbishop of Vienna.

Others in the Jewish world criticized the statement stating that it was a breach on the world view and traditions of Judaism and that it goes against the Torah.

== See also ==
- Catholic Church and Judaism
- Christian–Jewish reconciliation
- Christianity and Judaism
- Dabru Emet
