= Commonwealth of Pagan Communities of Siberia–Siberian Veche =

The Commonwealth of Pagan Communities of Siberia–Siberian Veche (Russian: Содружество Языческих Общин Сибири–Сибирское Вече), also known as SibVeche (СибВече), is a Rodnover organisation which covers the region of Siberia, Russia, officially recognised by the government since 2015.

Though it is primarily devoted to Slavic religion, participation of individuals and communities of autochthonous Siberian religions is welcome, and some member communities (including Svarte Aske) follow Germanic Heathen beliefs. The organisation is headed by Trislav from Altai Krai and has communities in Novosibirsk, Krasnoyarsk, Tomsk, Kemerovo, Barnaul and the Rebrikhinsky District of Altai Krai, but also in Almaty, Kazakhstan.

== See also ==
- Slavic Native Faith
- Tengrism
