= Christian Scholars Group =

The Christian Scholars Group is group of about 20 Christian scholars, theologians, historians and clergy from various Christian denominations which works to "develop more adequate Christian theologies of the church's relationship to Judaism and the Jewish people."

== A Sacred Obligation ==
The group issued a statement in September 2002, "A Sacred Obligation: Rethinking Christian Faith in Relation to Judaism and the Jewish People", which states, in part:

"For most of the past two thousand years, Christians have erroneously portrayed Jews as unfaithful, holding them collectively responsible for the death of Jesus and therefore accursed by God. In agreement with many official Christian declarations, we reject this accusation as historically false and theologically invalid. It suggests that God can be unfaithful to the eternal covenant with the Jewish people. We acknowledge with shame the suffering this distorted portrayal has brought upon the Jewish people.... We believe that revising Christian teaching about Judaism and the Jewish people is a central and indispensable obligation of theology in our time." They then offer ten positions, with detailed explanations, "for the consideration of our fellow Christians. We urge all Christians to reflect on their faith in light of these statements."

== 10 positions ==
The ten positions, in brief, are:

1. God's covenant with the Jewish people endures forever.
2. Jesus of Nazareth lived and died as a faithful Jew, see also Historical Jesus.
3. Ancient rivalries must not define Christian-Jewish relations today.
4. Judaism is a living faith, enriched by many centuries of development.
5. The Bible both connects and separates Jews and Christians.
6. Affirming God's enduring covenant with the Jewish people has consequences for Christian understandings of salvation.
7. Christians should not target Jews for conversion.
8. Christian worship that teaches contempt for Judaism dishonors God.
9. We affirm the importance of the land of Israel for the life of the Jewish people.
10. Christians should work with Jews for the healing of the world.

The statement may or may not reflect the views of the scholars' various denominations.

== Notable people ==
- Celia Deutsch
