= Mordecai ben Nissan =

18th century Karaite Jewish scholar

Mordechai ben Nissan
- Years active: 18th century

Mordecai ben Nissan the Elder (Heb. מרדכי בן ניסן הזקן, Mordechai ben Nissan ha-Zaken) was a Karaite Jewish scholar who lived at Krasny Ostrów, Poland (now Kukeziv, Ukraine) in the second half of the 18th century.

== Education ==
He studied under Joseph ben Samuel, hazzan of Halych, and David ben Shalom ha-Zaken, and at an early age became proficient both in rabbinical and in Karaite literature.

== Works ==
Mordecai is chiefly known through his work "Dod Mordechai" (Vienna, 1830), written in answer to four questions addressed in 1698 to David ben Shalom ha-Zaken by Jacobus Trigland, professor of theology at the University of Leiden. These four questions were: (1) Is the Karaite sect identical with that which existed at the time of the Second Temple under the name "Sadducees," or did it originate with Anan ben David, as the Rabbinites assert? (2) Was Aquila, the proselyte, to whom Menahem Qala'i had addressed letters, identical with the Greek translator or with the author of the Targum? (3) Is the Moreh Aharon identical with the Sefer ha-Mitzvot of Aaron ben Elijah of Nicomedia; if not, who was its author? (4) Has the Karaite Bible any variants from the Rabbinite Bible, and what is the prevailing belief among the Karaites with regard to the time of the introduction of vowels and accents?

Mordecai divided his work into 12 chapters, each of which bears the name of a Jewish tribe. To the first question he answered that, although the Karaite sect is not identical with that of the Sadducees, it nevertheless existed at the time of the Second Temple. He divided the history of the Karaites into three epochs: the first beginning with the formation of a separate congregation without any external distinction from other congregations, in the time of Simeon ben Shetach; the second beginning with Anan, who made an open stand against the Talmudists; and the third beginning with the fourteenth century, when the first traces of the decline of Karaism began to be felt. The second question is left unanswered. The name "Menahem," he says, is nowhere to be met with except in the Mibhar, and there is, therefore, no information concerning his personality. As to the author of the Targum, Mordecai knows him only through the Rabbinite authorities. The third question is answered satisfactorily, and Mordecai gives by the way information of the Karaite works found in Poland. The Karaite Bible, he says, in answer to the fourth question, does not vary from that of the Rabbinites; and the vowels and accents are believed to have been transmitted to Moses on Mount Sinai. Here Mordecai cites Azariah dei Rossi and displays a vast knowledge of rabbinical literature.

(This work was subsequently translated into Latin by Johann Christoph Wolf and published with the Latin and Hebrew in parallel columns, as Notitia Karaeorum (Hamburg, 1714).)

In addition, Mordecai wrote: Sefer Ma'amar Mordechai, a commentary on the Mibhar of Aaron ben Joseph; Derek ha-Yam, dissertation on a passage of the Mibhar to Genesis ix. 21; Kelalim Yafim, an elementary Hebrew grammar; Yad Adonai, the subject of which is not known; Lebush Malkhut, on the differences between the Rabbinites and the Karaites; liturgical poems, some of which have been inserted in the Karaite ritual.

== Resources ==
, which cites the following bibliography:

- Jost, Geschichte des Judenthums und Seiner Sekten, ii. 371 et seq.;
- Julius Fürst, Geschichte des Karäerthums. 1862, iii. 87 et seq.;
- Adolf Neubauer. Aus der Petersburger Bibliothek: Beiträge und Documente zur Geschichte des Karäerthums und der karäischen Literatur. Oskar Leiner, 1866. pp. 76 et seq.

- Notitia Karaeorum on Google Books
