= List of French films of 2000 =

A list of films produced in France in 2000.

Title	Director	Cast	Genre	Notes
À l'attaque!	Robert Guédiguian	Ariane Ascaride	Comedy Drama	
Amazon	Philippe de Broca			
Baise-moi	Virginie Despentes	Karen Lancaume, Raffaëla Anderson	Thriller drama	3 nominations
Chicken Run	Peter Lord, Nick Park	Phil Daniels, Lynn Ferguson, Mel Gibson, Tony Haygarth, Jane Horrocks, Miranda Richardson, Julia Sawalha, Timothy Spall, Imelda Staunton, Benjamin Whitrow	Stop-motion animated comedy	Co-production with the UK and the US
Code Unknown	Michael Haneke	Juliette Binoche, Thierry Neuvic		Entered into the 2000 Cannes Film Festival
Comedy of Innocence	Raúl Ruiz	Isabelle Huppert	Drama	
Deep in the Woods	Lionel Delplanque	François Berléand, Clotilde Courau	Horror	1 win
Deuxième vie	Patrick Braoudé	Patrick Braoudé, Maria de Medeiros, Isabelle Candelier	Comedy, fantasy	
Drôle de Félix	Olivier Ducastel, Jacques Martineau	Sami Bouajila, Patachou	Comedy drama	5 wins, 2 nominations
Élisabeth - Ils sont tous nos enfants	Pasquale Squitieri	Claudia Cardinale, Jean-Claude Brialy, Marion Corrales	TV	
Esther Kahn	Arnaud Desplechin	Summer Phoenix, Ian Holm		Entered into the 2000 Cannes Film Festival
Family Pack (Que faisaient les femmes pendant que l'homme marchait sur la lune?)	Chris Vander Stappen	Marie Bunel, Hélène Vincent, Mimie Mathy, Tsilla Chelton, Macha Grenon, Christian Crahay, Emmanuel Bilodeau	Drama	Belgian, French, Swiss and Canadian coproduction
The Girl	Sande Zeig	Claire Keim, Agathe de La Boulaye	Romance	
The Gleaners and I	Agnès Varda		Documentary	11 wins & 2 nominations
Happenstance	Laurent Firode	Audrey Tautou, Faudel	Comedy drama	3 wins
Harry, He's Here to Help	Dominik Moll	Laurent Lucas, Sergi Lopez		Entered into the 2000 Cannes Film Festival
The King's Daughters	Patricia Mazuy	Jean-Pierre Kalfon, Isabelle Huppert		Screened at the 2000 Cannes Film Festival
Mirka	Rachid Benhadj	Vanessa Redgrave, Gérard Depardieu, Sergio Rubini, Franco Nero	Drama	
Pâques Man	Michel Leray	Loïc Houdré, Ludovic Berthillot, Lyia Terki	Horror thriller	
Le Roi danse	Gérard Corbiau	Benoît Magimel, Enrico Lo Verso	History drama	
Sade	Benoît Jacquot	Daniel Auteuil, Marianne Denicourt	Drama	2 wins & 2 nominations
Sentimental Destinies	Olivier Assayas			Entered into the 2000 Cannes Film Festival
Signs and Wonders	Jonathan Nossiter	Charlotte Rampling	Drama	1 nomination
Sous Le Sable	François Ozon	Charlotte Rampling, Bruno Cremer	Drama	
Taking Wing	Steve Suissa	Clément Sibony, Isabelle Carré	Drama	Entered into the 22nd Moscow International Film Festival
The Taste of Others	Agnès Jaoui	Anne Alvaro, Jean-Pierre Bacri	Comedy drama	Nominated for an Oscar, +11 wins, +10 nominations
Taxi 2	Gérard Krawczyk	Samy Naceri	Action comedy	1 win
To Matthieu	Xavier Beauvois	Benoît Magimel, Nathalie Baye	Drama	
Tomorrow's Another Day	Jeanne Labrune	Nathalie Baye, Jeanne Balibar		
The Town Is Quiet	Robert Guédiguian	Ariane Ascaride	Drama	
La Vache et le président	Philippe Muyl	Mehdi Ortelsberg, Bernard Yerlès	Comedy drama	1 win
La Veuve de Saint-Pierre	Patrice Leconte	Juliette Binoche, Daniel Auteuil	Drama	Nominated for Golden Globe, +2 wins, +6 nom.
Water Drops on Burning Rocks	François Ozon	Bernard Giraudeau, Malik Zidi, Ludivine Sagnier, Anna Levine	Drama	2 wins & 2 nominations
