= Catholic Church and Judaism =

The Catholic Church and Judaism have a long and complex history of cooperation and conflict, and have had a strained relationship throughout history that has improved since the twentieth century. Both claim a common heritage of tradition, going back to Abraham and insist that they are the true extension of faith described in the Old Testament or Hebrew Bible, which they evoke to establish their authority and justify their status as God's covenantal partner.

Both religions have roots in the period of Second Temple Judaism and only gradually over the next centuries separated from each other while engaging in mutual polemics. Though initially persecuted, Christianity was legitimised in 313 and was declared the official religion of the Roman Empire in 380, which led to increasing restrictions on the Jews by the imperial government. Based on the teachings of Paul and Augustine of Hippo as well as Roman law, the Catholic Church opted to allow Jews to live in the now Christian Empire in their role as witnesses to the Old Testament. This role offered them some privileges and protections, such as from forced conversion, but also limited their role and rights in society as stated in Roman law. Rabbinic Judaism generally viewed Christians as heretics and idolaters. The popes, starting with Gregory the Great, often served as the persons who Jews would petition for intervention and Gregory's letter Sicut Judaeis became the basis for later papal bulls of protection.

Whereas Jews lived fairly unharmed in the early Middle Ages, the situation changed gradually with the start of the crusades at the end of the eleventh century. Popes usually spoke out against anti-Jewish violence but with the increase in temporal powers of the papacy, it also started to regulate Jewish presence in society. Nevertheless, ecclesiastic (and secular) protection of the Jews was not always possible and some churchmen incited violence against Jews. By the thirteenth century, Augustine's witness theology had eroded significantly so that Jews were often not deemed worthy of the protection anymore and were expelled by the rulers of some Christian kingdoms. With the start of the Reformation and Counter-Reformation, the focus of the Church shifted to converting the Jews.

After the Holocaust in the 20th century, the Second Vatican Council in the 1960s led to improvements in the relationship between the Catholic Church and Judaism, following the Church's repudiation of the Jewish deicide accusation and its addressing the topic of antisemitism. In 1965, the Church issued the document "Nostra aetate" which condemned antisemitism and recognized the shared heritage of Jews and Christians. Since the 1970s, interfaith committees have met regularly to address relations between the religions, and Catholic and Jewish institutions have continued to work together on issues such as social justice, interfaith dialogue, and Holocaust education. The Catholic Church has also taken steps to address the harm caused by past persecution of Jews, such as the establishment of the Commission for Religious Relations with the Jews and the apology of the Pope John Paul II to the Jewish community.

== Antiquity ==
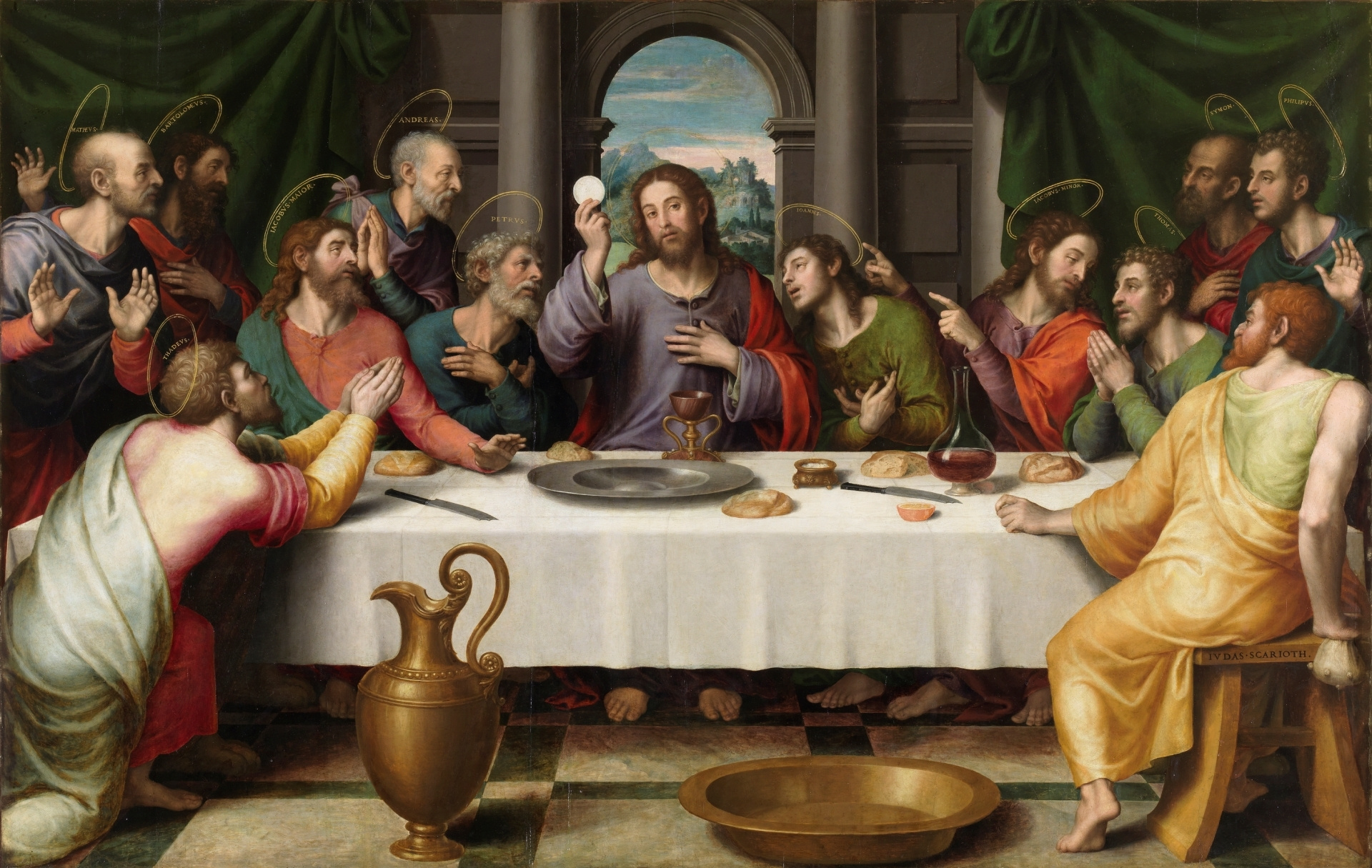
The Last Supper of Jesus and his disciples may have been to mark to the Jewish feast of Passover. Today, Christians recall the Last Supper in the Mass.

Both Christianity and modern Rabbinic Judaism assert that their tradition goes back to Abraham and the Hebrew religion, using this connection to establish their authority and justify their status as God's special covenantnal partner. While traditional views hold that Christianity evolved from a Jewish sect to an independent religion very early on, modern scholar Alan F. Segal considers both religions as (rival) siblings and simultaneous offshoots from Second Temple Judaism that parted over many centuries. Scholars sees different points of parting ways, from the ministry of Jesus or Paul the Apostle, to the Constantinian period when the Roman imperial power allied itself with Christianity, or even later, with some scholars favouring a Jewish-Christian continuum.

The first Christians were Jewish and the early spread of Christianity was aided by the wide extent of the Jewish diaspora in the Roman Empire. Although Jesus was not accepted as the messiah by Jewish leaders, worshipers of the diverging religions initially co-existed within the Jewish synagogues, reading the Jewish scriptures, singing the Psalms and joining in the various rituals of the Jewish calendar. Christians moved away from Jews in subsequent centuries, but modern Catholicism has retained much of its Hebrew literary heritage, the Old Testament (Tanakh). Even as pagans and gentiles increasingly began to attend Christian worship, the Jewish framework remained strong. Paul the Apostle initially took part in the Jewish persecution of the early Christian movement, but following his conversion, he became a leading exponent for the Christian movement to become a religion open to all, which could move away from strict Jewish dietary laws and the requirement of circumcision. In traditional scholarship, Paul has been seen as the founder of Christianity as an independent religion and as originator of supersessionism, the theory that the Jewish people were replaced by the Christian Church as God's chosen people. Among Pauline scholar, this view has changed since the 1960s, with a greater emphasis on Paul's Jewish affiliation and viewing his conversion as his taking up his mission to the gentiles.

Like the other Jewish groups in Second Temple Judaism, Christianity engaged in the sacred polemic tradition and also the very earliest Christian writers assumed the hostile tone with which Jewish sects addressed each other. (Note: Paul Johnson notes the similarity between the language of the four Gospels and the Dead Sea Scrolls, where the Jewish opponents of the Jewish authors are described as "the sons of Belial" and "the Jews" is used, similarly to in the Gospel of John, for the Jewish authors' opponents.) The early Church was in an intense rivalry with rabbinic Judaism and patristic writers wrote specifically against three threats they perceived from it: its appeal to some Christians caused strong Judaising tendencies; Jewish attempts to proselytise Christians; and some Jews were associated with certain Christian heresies. Anti-Jewish literature continued to be a widespread patristic genre and was often based on the Old Testament, which was thought to foresee the replacement of the Jewish people as God's people by the gentiles. Over time, these writings were lifted out of their historica context and, specifically the charge of "collective guilt" for the Deicide and the "sons of Devil" charge were fused together with the already established and wide-spread pagan anti-Semitic tradition to become the basis for Christian anti-semitism. Nevertheless, Paul's writing in Romans 11 that Israel would be saved was interpreted that the Jews would convert to Christianity at the End of Days, signalling the dawn of a new era predicted by the prophets of the Old Testament.

On the other hand, as most Jewish writings regarding Christians date back to the Middle Ages, scholars have traditionally interpreted this as a lack of Jewish interest in Christianity in antiquity. Contemporary scholars, however, view these writings as a development of a more ancient anti-Christian tradition, which can be found, for instance, in the Talmud, and conceive rabbinical Judaism as a religion that struggled with Christianity from the outset, consequently shaping its identity. According to this view, the occasional mentions of Christianity in the Talmud serve as a core critique of Christian doctrine and represent an effort to present an alternative to the Christian narrative, which is then extended in the later Toledot Yeshu. In general, according to early Talmudic writings, Christians living in the Land of Israel were considered idolaters, in contrast to Christians living outside of it, presumably because the former were considered Jewish Christians who were supposed to know that they were violating the precept of God's unity (yihud ha-Shem). During the rabbinate of Gamaliel II the Birkat haMinim, the "Benediction concerning heretics", was rephrased to apply to Christians and at that time Jewish Christians were cast out of the synagogues. Soon after the Bar Kokhba revolt first anti-Christian polemic began to appear in Jewish Bible commentaries.

=== Late Antiquity ===
In the Edict of Milan in 313, Emperor Constantine I ended the persecution of Christians in the Roman Empire and gave Christians, who at times were also called Catholics, the liberty to practise their religion. Christianity soon became the preferred religion of the empire and from the 340s it began to assume some characteristics of a state religion. While Constantine began a policy of toleration towards the Christians, he reversed imperial policy that had favoured the Jews and diminished their rights. In the 380s, religious uniformity became the official policy of the empire and several laws were passed that limited the rights of heretics, pagans and also the Jews, though Judaism remained a religio licita. Influential for later Catholic doctrine was in particular the fifth-century Theodosian code, a compilation of imperial constitutions from the reign of Constantine I (272–337) to Theodosius II (401–450) that were (re-)issued as laws in 438. The code provided a blueprint on how Jews should be treated in a Christian society, including both restrictions (such as forbidding Jews to proselytise or have Christian slaves, exclude them from certain public offices or threatening the curtailment of privileges if Jews insulted Christians) as well as providing them protective basic rights (such as affirming their citizenship, outlawing attacks on synagogues, granting them due legal process and prohibiting arbitrary cancellation of their rights). The papacy insisted on the implementation of the Theodosian Code from the fifth century onwards.

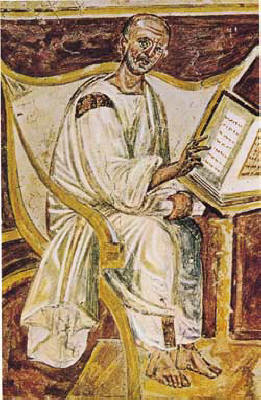
St Augustine of Hippo, who contributed significantly towards Catholic doctrine on the Jews, as depicted in the Lateran

The aim of Church leaders at the time was never to end Judaism but they pondered the position of Jews in a Christian society. The fact that Christianity had become the religion of the empire and many other peoples was perceived as the realisation of the prophecies about the kingdom of God and that the Church was right whereas the Jews were wrong. Around 400, St Augustine, one of the most influential and foundational figures of Catholic theology, developed an important teaching that significantly influenced the Church's position regarding the Jews. In his writing De civitate Dei, Augustine, referencing psalm 59:12, argued that because the Jews were unknowing witnesses to Christ spared by God, they must be protected. As they accepted the Old Testament, this was a disinterested testimony to the truth and historical basis of biblical Christological prophecy and as such Jews were living witnesses to the divine origin of Scripture. Next, their suffering due to the destruction of the temple and their dispersion over the world showed that God had punished them for their rejection of Christ. Augustine inteperpreted this as the testimony of the error of Judaism and the truth of Christianity. Thirdly, Jews highlighted the distinction between the old, physical Israel and the new, spiritual Israel for Christians. Finally, Jews served as a rhetorical personification of carnality and sin and thus reminded Christians that sin was part of the human condition. For Augustine, that meant that Christians should encourage the presence of Jews amongst their midst as well as the continued observance of Jewish rites; as such, he placed little emphasis on evangelising Jews.

== Middle Ages ==
=== Early Middle Ages ===
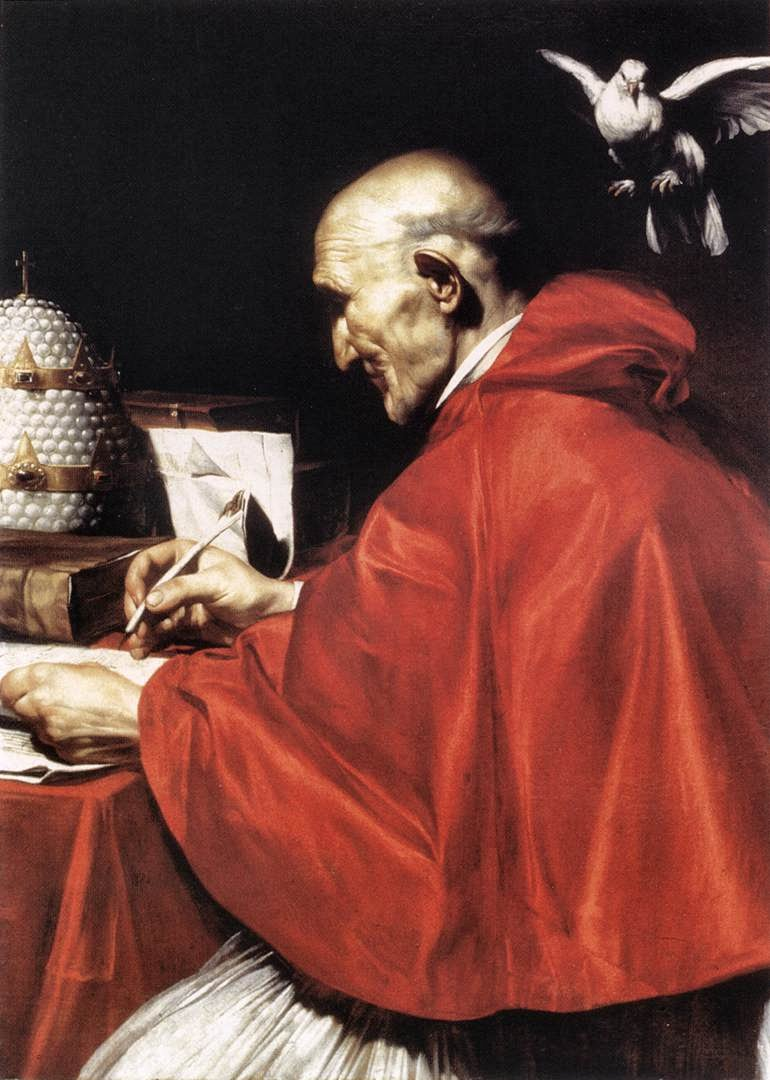
Pope Gregory the Great's 598 Bull wrote of a duty of Christians to protect Jews, which became official Church doctrine.

Contrary to the Church in the Eastern Roman Empire, which inherited the corpus of Hellenistic anti-semitism and where violent episodes and destruction of synagogues were more frequent, the Western Roman Church opted to tolerate and protect Jews. This was brought into Church teaching under Pope Gregory the Great (c. 540–604) at the end of the sixth century based on the theological theories of Paul and Augustine and existing Roman Law. In June 598, in reaction to anti-Jewish attacks by Christians in Palermo, Pope Gregory wrote a Papal Bull which became the foundation of Catholic doctrine in relation to the Jews and specified that, although the Jews had not accepted salvation through Christ, and were therefore condemned by God until such time as they accept salvation, Christians were duty-bound to protect the Jews as an important part of Christian civilization. The bull explained that similar to as Jews were not allowed to pursue more freedoms than Roman law allowed their position, so Christians were not allowed to infringe the rights that Jews had. The bull, which started with the phrase "Sicut Judaeis", was later known as "Constitutio pro Judaeis" and was re-issued by later popes in response to persecutions and appeals from Jews for protection. Thus, though a "persecuting spirit" often existed among the general population through the Middle Ages, Jews enjoyed a level of protection in law from the papacy.

In Gregory's correspondence with other bishops, he urged them to ensure that Jews were treated justly and granted their legal rights, urged them to not interfere with Judaic internal affairs and allow them to celebrate their feasts freely and in some cases to return to them synagogues that had been confiscated. At the same time, Gregory insisted - in line with the Theodosian code - that the activities of Jews in Christian society must remain limited and he was specifically adamant about Jewish ownership of Christian slaves, which he considered an insult to Christ. He also opposed Judaising tendencies and his sermons drew on traditional images of Jews as dark, blind and stubborn unbelievers. Gregory was also keen on winning over Jews to Christianity and encouraged his bishops to work tirelessly for that goal.

Most importantly, Pope Gregory insisted that Jews should not be forced to convert or physically harmed. One of his letters on conversion was deemed by later canonists so important that it was included in Gratian's Concordia discordantium canonum which became a fundamental work for both canon lawyers and Decretalists (those who commented on twelfth and thirteenth-century papal decrees. While Gregory's teaching was kept until the later Middle Ages, there was one exception when the Visigothic king Sisebut and his successors ordered Jews for political reasons to be converted by force shortly after Gregory's ruling. Though this was radically opposed to Christian tradition, the Spanish Church ratified the validity of the forced conversions at the Synod of Toledo in 694. Overall, though there were some instances of temporary and topical hostility, there was no popular or economic anti-semitism. Augustine's theological justification allowed Jews to live relatively safe, even with a certain degree of religious tolerance, among their Christian hosts up to the twelfth century.

=== High Middle Ages ===
The relation between the Christians and the Jews changed significantly after the start of the Crusades at the end of the eleventh century. The call for crusade led to questions about marginal groups in Christianity such as the Jews, whose activities as moneylenders often stoked the hostility of Christian masses. Further, crusading fervour was partially provoked by the stories of ill-treatment of Christians in the Holy Land and Jews were occasionally portrayed as treacherous auxiliaries of Muslim rulers. (Note: Already in 1010 rumours circulated that Jews had persuaded the Muslims to destroy the Church of the Holy Sepulchre, which had taken place in the year before by order of Caliph el-Hakim, and resulted in pogroms against Jews. The Jews in this instance appealed to pope Sergius IV for protection and also received it.) As the first crusaders started making their way to the Holy Land in 1096, certain groups of the crusaders started attacking Jewish communities, first in France and then in the Rhineland. While some local rulers, also including bishops, were able to repulse the attackers, the attackers massacred most of the ancient Jewish communities in the Rhineland, with some forced conversions also taking place. In the preparation for the Second Crusade, the preaching of Radulf the Cistercian, a monk who had left his monastery without permission, led again to murders of Jews, although a repetition of the Rhineland massacres was prevented by the preaching and intervention of St Bernard of Clairvaux.

In response to the persecutions during crusades and later also to refute accusations of ritual murder and blood libel, popes from Pope Callixtus II (c. 1120) onward started reissuing pope Gregory's Sicut Judaeis as a letter of protection for the Jews. (Note: The bull was reaffirmed by many popes including Alexander III, Celestine III (1191–1198), Innocent III (1199), Honorius III (1216), Gregory IX (1235), Innocent IV (1246), Alexander IV (1255), Urban IV (1262), Gregory X (1272 and 1274), Nicholas III, Martin IV (1281), Honorius IV (1285–1287), Nicholas IV (1288–1292), Clement VI (1348), Urban V (1365), Boniface IX (1389), Martin V (1422), and Nicholas V (1447). The bull forbade Christians, on pain of excommunication, from forcing Jews to convert, from harming them, from taking their property, from disturbing the celebration of their festivals, and from interfering with their cemeteries.) Papal correspondence during that time shows a clear distinction between heretics, Muslims and Jews, of which only the later hold a special plan in God's plan of salvation in their role as witnesses and therefore deserve protection. (Note: In the letter "Placuit nobis" from pope Alexander II to Spanish bishops in 1063 he stressed the difference between warlike Muslims and peaceful Jews and instructed Christians to wage war against the former but not the latter. Pope Alexander hoped that this leniency would ensure that Jews be reconcilled to Christianity and he stressed, referencing Gregory the Great explicitly, that Christians were not to harm Jews that God in His mercy had spared.) Popes nevertheless remained uneasy about the question whether Jews deliberately and knowingly murdered Christ and some called the Jews "enemies of God" or "enemies of Christ". Jews were more often described by the words caecitia (meaning the Jews blindness to the truth of Christian teaching), perfidia (see discussion below) as well as by duritia (obduracy, meaning their spiritual hardness of hard to accept Christ's teaching in the New Testament). This was also often expressed in the images of Ecclesia and Synagoga, which showed the triumph of the Church over the blind, broken Synagogue.

The anti-Christian perception of antiquity continued in Jewish medieval tradition. The Rhineland massacres left a deep mark in the Jewish consciousness and were accompanied by an increased anger on Christianity. This was expressed in a veiled way in their liturgy and more openly among Jewish writers, some considering Christians capricious assassins, always ready to strike. Jewish apologists deferred the Jewish triumph over Christianity to the messianic future, in which the Christian society, equated with the kingdom of Edom in Ashkenaz liturgy, would be ultimately destroyed. Still, for the time, halakhists were required to find an answer to the status of Christians in order to regulate the daily interactions of Jews with Christians as many Talmudic halakhic precepts limited Jewish interaction with idolaters. Therefore, they distinguished between the idolaters described in the Talmud and Christians, considered the pros and cons of not doing business with Christians and developed the principle of shituf, according to which Christians believe in the same God, but associated something else with Him (such as the Trinity). Among the Ashkenaz, the thirteenth century rabbi Menachem HaMeiri takes a special role in that he thought that thought the Christian faith was different to the Jewish one, both believed in the same God, that Christianity did not belong to the category of idolaters and that its veneration of Saints was not actual practise of idolatry. The Sephardic tradition, represented by Maimonides, took a more radical, univocal view of Christians than the Talmud and viewed them all as idolaters. However, in his "Treatise on Kings", Maimonides included both Christianity and Islam within a single providential plan in which both religions are in a preparatory journey of all humanity towards the messianic event. The protection the papacy offered to the Jews was often emphasized in several Hebrew texts and some gave the pope a role in God's plan for salvation and any future messianic redemption. Especially the Jewish community in Rome had enjoyed a direct line of communication already since the time of Gregory the Great and continued throughout Middle Ages to act as petitioners for other Jewish communities in Europe.

To that point, the Jews had been only of interest to the papacy in reaction to immediate problems, such as Christian queries about Jewish status or Jewish complaints of illtreatment. The increasing perception of the papacy as highest spiritual leader of the papacy, combined with the increase of its temporal powers, led in turn to a greater motive to define and regulate Christian society and faith, which also led to renewed attention to the Jews. The Third Lateran Council under pope Alexander III, additionally to confirming ancient restriction on Jews such as bans on holding public offices, also decreed that Jews must pay the tithe. Under pope Innocent III, who was concerned about both external enemies of Christianity such as the Muslims who had recaptued Jerusalem as well as internal such as heretics, the papal protection was made conditional by including a phrase in Sicut Judaeis that only those Jews that did not plot against Christianity would be protected. In his perception, Jews did not belong to the Christian society and could not necessarily be trusted. This manifested also in the decrees of the Fourth Lateran Council he convened in 1215. Those of its decrees that dealt with the Jews exceeded by far those of previous councils, reiterated previous regulations such as the prohibition to hold public offices and condemned Jewish ursury. It also introduced the rule for Jews (and Muslims) to wear a distinguishing garb, similar to already existing Muslim legislation for their Christian and Jewish minorities. This rule, which was implemented in Christian kingdoms to various degrees, should according to Innocent show the right theological status of Jews and ensure that they would not be harmed, though in practice it often encouraged all kinds of discrimination. Pope Innocent III in 1201 also argued that in some cases, even if force had been used in baptisms, they were nonetheless valid and the person would need to remain a Christian. Papal interest in Jews should, however, not be overstated as and there was no overarching, let alone denigrading papal policy towards the Jews that all popes during the High Middle Ages pursued.

By the thirteenth century, Augustine's witness theory had eroded significantly so that the Jews were increasingly deemed not worth the proposed toleration. Several economic, political, but also theological reasons have been cited. Firstly, disappearance of pagans and the ascent of Islam are said to have decreased the uniqueness of Jews in the Christian West. Secondly, the rise of rationalism in Christian theology is said to have made the Jewish refusal to convert seem irrational - and even inhuman - given the proposed arguments. Though according to the Augustinian tradition the Jews were considered blind to the truth of Christianity, some Christians, based on their reading of certain Bible passages, believed that Jews had killed Jesus knowing that he was the Messiah. This fuelled the popular belief that those who had spilled God's blood knowingly would engage in ritual murder, a charge that began being levelled against Jews from the mid-twelfth century onwards and which often resulted in a reissuance of Sicut Judaeis. At the same time, rabbinic literature and the Talmud became increasingly known in the West, which called into question the loyalty of Jews to the Old Testament as described by Augustine while also often being perceived as a hindrance in converting Jews. Finally, the growth of the Dominican and Franciscan orders, who were charged with ensuring orthodoxy of faith, is said to have spread a theology that did not allow Jewish presence in Latin Christendom. These developments resulted also in the first expulsions of Jews from Christian kingdoms (France in 1182, England in 1280), often justified by the claim to protect Christian societ from the bad influence of Jews.

Jews had been often perceived as subversive elements in the social order and the Church was not entirely wrong when it identified Jewish influences in heretic movements such as the Albigensians or the later Hussites. Some heretics discussed scriptural texts with learned Jews, who also lent them their books. Though the Dominicans and Franciscans, especially their founders, were initially not hostile towards the Jews and at first even tried to discourage the charges of ritual murder, they increasingly held the view that Augustine's teaching was no longer tenable, that the Jewish protective rights should be limited and that the Jews should be converted. Pope Gregory IX also gave them the task to inspect all Jewish books in France for alleged heresies and blasphemies, as certain Jewish converts to Christianity had brought to attention that medieval Judaism placed a stronger focus of its study and laws on the Talmud and not, like first century Judaism, on the Old Testament. In particular, the Talmud was considered especially dangerous as it was believed to contain blasphemies, (Note: Among the points Christians found insulting in the Talmud were passages that seemed to insult Christ, that blasphemed God the Father by portraying him as weeping or being out-argued or forbade Jews to mix with Christians.) hinder Jewish conversion, and rival the unique authority of the Old Testament while also encouraging Jews to ignore it completely

This also led to the Disputation of Paris in 1240, the first of many debates in which Christian scholars, often represented by Jewish converts with knowledge of the Jewish writings, tried to convince Jewish scholars of the truth of Christianity or interrogate them about blasphemies contained in rabbinical writings. The leading disputant on the Christian side, the excommunicated Jew and Christian convert Nicholas Donin, convinced the commission presiding over the disputation to rule against the Talmud and thus for the first time, the Talmud was burned in 1242 in Paris. This position was revised a few years later by pope Innocent IV in response to petitions by Jewish rabbis from France who insisted that without the Talmud they could not make sense of their Bibles. Thereafter, the Talmud was more subject to censorship than destruction, though later popes varied between censoring and completely banning the book. The Spanish Dominican Ramon Martí translated parts of the Talmud into Latin and soon Christian scholars also sought to use the Talmud in their attacks against Judaism and to convert Jews by proving Christian truths from within it.

=== Late Middle Ages ===
The "Black Death" pandemic swept through Asia and the Middle East and into Europe between 1347 and 1350, and is believed to have killed between a quarter and half of Europe's population. Popular opinion blamed the Jews for the plague, and violence directed at them erupted throughout the continent. In defence of the Jews, Pope Clement VI issued two papal bulls in 1348 (6 July and 26 September), the latter named Quamvis Perfidiam, which condemned the violence and said those who blamed the plague on the Jews had been "seduced by that liar, the Devil." He went on to emphasise that the Jews were suffering just as badly as everyone else. He urged clergy to take action to protect Jews and offered them papal protection in the city of Avignon. Though also Christian rulers issued similar statements, this led to the biggest wave in anti-semitic violence since the Rhineland massacres.

The period was also characterised by renewed expulsions in France and parts of Germany, which were often accompanied by forced conversions. These conversions did not solve the perception of Christians that Jews were contaminating Christian society and especially in Iberia, where after the massacres of 1391 tens of thousands of Jews converted either forcibly or out of fear, the new Christians (or conversos) were perceived as a hidden danger as they were now, at least superficially, indistinguishable from other Christians. The Spanish population suspected them, as conversion gave Jews same rights, of being an economic threat or of still practising Judaism and thus being hypocrites and hidden subversives. This led to the Spanish Cortes passing discriminatory laws against new Christians and the creation of the Spanish Inquisition (again under participation of the Dominicans), which sought to distinguish between true Christians and impostors and punish those Jews that had secretly reverted to Judaism. Though Pope Sixtus IV had initially approved the inquisition in a bull in 1478, four years later he complained to the Spanish king and asked him to establish certain rules to safeguard the rights for a fair trial of the accused such as excluding enemies acting as witnesses or allow repentant accused to confess and receive absolution instead of facing trial. He was rejected and in 1492 Jews were given the choice of either baptism or expulsion, as a result more than 160,000 Jews were expelled. Thus, by the end of the fifteenth century, only few places with Jews remained in Western Europe, including the Papal States which also took in some of the expelled Jews.

With the deterioration of the conditions of Jewish communities in Europe a more extensive body of Jewish anti-Christian polemics developed that, written in Hebrew, was intended to arm them against their spiritual adversaries and help them resist the temptation to convert. For that, Jews also engaged more with the Gospels, Christian doctrine and Christian biblical commentary in order to refute arguments aimed at their core beliefs.

== Early Modern period ==
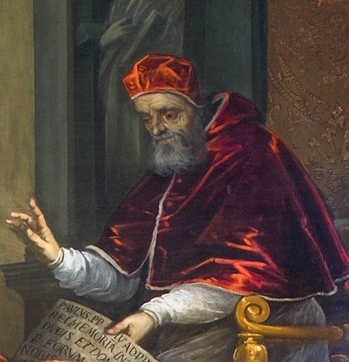
Pope Paul IV, the author of Cum nimis absurdum

The Renaissance led to a renewed interest in Hebrew language and literature by Christian Hebraists, including some Protestant thinkers. While many Jews initially welcomed the Reformation as it weakened the Christian powers and Martin Luther turned to them in his translation of the Bible, he soon called in his writings for their merciless persecution or expulsion from Christian territories, which many Protestant rulers implemented. Luther also berated the Catholic Church as "Judaising" and considered its emphasis on elaborate rituals as Jewish legalism. In the ensuing wars between the Catholic emperor Charles V and the Protestant German rulers, Jews often supported the Imperial army and prayed for its success, though Charles V also instituted the Portuguese Inquisition in 1543 (Note: In 1536 Pope Paul III confirmed the establishment of the Portuguese Inquisition with a papal bull. The major target of the Portuguese Inquisition were Jewish converts to Catholicism, who were suspected of secretly practicing Judaism. Many of these were originally Spanish Jews who had left Spain for Portugal, when Spain forced Jews to convert to Christianity or leave. The number of the victims it made between 1540 and 1765 is estimated at around 40,000.) and expelled the Jews from Naples in 1541. The expulsions created a huge influx of Jewish refugees, which led to the first Jewish ghetto in Venice while initially the papacy, especially under Clement VII, adopted a benign policy and allowed them to settle in the Papal States and granted them protection from the Inquisition. Nevertheless, some Catholic writers blamed Jews for helping and inspiring Protestant thinkers.

A few years later, within the responding Counter-Reformation, the Catholic Church begun a process of self-definition in the face of the various heterodoxies and heresies and in this context also reopened the question on the status of the Jews. While Jews would be still tolerated, the justification was now the expectation that they soon converted and thus initiate the Second Coming of Christ. In 1553, following the Bragadin-Giustiniani dispute, the Inquisition confiscated the Talmud and burned it first in Rome, then in many other Italian cities in 1553, as it perceived the Talmud as a hindrance to Jewish conversion. Two years later, Cardinal Carafa, one of the founding six cardinals of the Roman Inquisition and hardliner against heretics, dissidents and Jews, became pope and ended the more tolerant policies of his predecessors. In 1555, he issued the bull Cum nimis absurdum, in which he ordered the construction of the Roman ghetto and imposed restrictions on the Jews, such as prohibiting them to engage in most professions outside of moneylending, owning real estate and limit them to one synagogue per city. Pius V went a step further and expelled the Jews from all cities of the Papal States except for Rome and Ancona. In 1593 Pope Clement VIII expelled the Jews from the Papal States with the bull Caeca et Obdurata. At the same time, the new Tridentine Catechism, result of the Council of Trent, while acknowledging that the Jews had historically crucified Jesus, it taught that the principal reason for the crucifixion was the common sins of humanity starting with the original sin and continued in perpetuity, with those committed by Christian being more severe since they knew and had accepted the teachings of Jesus Christ.

== The Second World War and the Holocaust ==
In the modern world, anti-Jewish sentiment reached its zenith with the murderous racial antisemitism of the Nazi Holocaust. In the aftermath of the defeat of Hitler's Germany, and discovery of the extent of Nazi war crimes, the long history of Christian anti-Judaism came to be critically examined by scholars attempting to explain the origins of the Holocaust.

Pope John XXIII acknowledged the role of the church in creating and perpetuating Christian antisemitism. Prior to his death in 1963, John prepared a document to be read by every Roman Catholic Church on a fixed date:

We are conscious today that many many centuries of blindness have cloaked our eyes so that we can no longer either see the beauty of Thy Chosen People nor recognize in their faces the features of our privileged brethren. We realize that the mark of Cain stands upon our foreheads. Across the centuries our brother Abel has lain in the blood which we drew or shed the tears we caused by forgetting Thy Love. Forgive us for the curse we falsely attached to their name as Jews. Forgive us for crucifying Thee a second time in their flesh. For we knew not what we did. ..

Following John's death, a movement for Christian–Jewish reconciliation grew. According to the historian Geoffrey Blainey, "In the following forty years, Christians and Jews were to come together more closely than at perhaps any other time since the half-century after Christ had died.

Furthermore, in her rejection of every persecution against any man, the Church, mindful of the patrimony she shares with the Jews and moved not by political reasons but by the Gospel's spiritual love, decries hatred, persecutions, displays of anti-Semitism, directed against Jews at any time and by anyone.

— Nostra aetate.

The Declaration of the Relation of the Church to Non-Christian Religions (Nostra aetate) signalled the beginning of a major theological reversal. In it, the Church set a cornerstone for a non-supersessionist understanding of the Christian-Jewish relationship by referencing Paul's thought in Romans 11:29 and insisting that God's covenant with the people of Israel was never revoked. The document highlights the shared heritage connecting the Church and Judaism, condemned hatred and persecution against Jews, prohibited portraying both ancient and contemporary Jewish people as responsible for Christ's death, and advocated for fraternal dialogue and biblical studies between Christians and Jews. The Vatican, as well as some Catholic hierarchies, have since issued some further documents elaborating on the principles of Nostra aetate.

== Contemporary ==
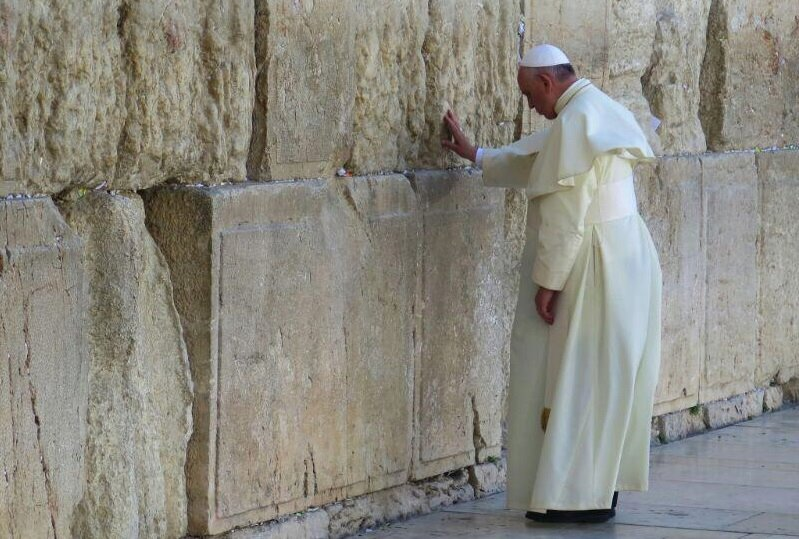
Pope Francis praying at the Western Wall in Jerusalem on his 2014 visit to Israel

Pope Francis has been considered to be particularly instrumental in furthering Catholic–Jewish relations. During a visit to a synagogue, Francis echoed Pope John Paul II's statement that Jews are the "elder brothers" of Christians, and further stated: "in fact you are our brothers and sisters in the faith. We all belong to one family, the family of God, who accompanies and protects us, His people."

In March 2026, following the resignation of former U.S. official Joe Kent over opposition to the 2026 Iran war, Catholic writers and clergy in the United States condemned antisemitism, emphasizing that doing so is part of Church teaching and warnings against normalizing antisemitic speech in political discourse. This was done in response to a planned political event with Kent featuring right-wing figures, such as Candace Owens and to controversy over comments made by Kent that drew accusations of invoking antisemitic tropes.

== Modern Catholic teachings about Judaism ==
=== Jewish "perfidy" ===
Though the term "perfidia" has been applied to the Jews (first time possibly by Pope Damasus I in the fourth century), there is uncertainty about the meaning of the word. Historians give various explanations, such as "disbelief", (Note: Erik Peterson shows that St Isidore of Seville wrote for instance: “In order to refute the unbelief (perfidiam) of the Jews, we have compiled certain testimonies from the Old Testament”) "distortion of faith", "deliberate denial of Jesus" or that it gradually developed from "disbelief" to "intentional and malovelent infidelity ... and treachery". Nevertheless, though it might seem harsh in contemporary views, the term was commonplace in medieval rhetoric and not deliberately abusive as suggested by some historians.

As such, the Good Friday Prayer of the Roman rite included a prayer that the "perfidious Jews" might come to acknowledge Christ. The English cognate "perfidious" had, over the centuries, gradually acquired the sense of "treacherous". In order to eliminate misunderstanding on this point, Pope Pius XII ordered in 1955 that, in Catholic liturgical books, the Latin word "perfidis" be properly translated "unbelieving", ensuring that the prayer be understood in its original sense: praying for the Jews who remained "unbelieving" concerning the Messiah. Indeed, the same adjective was used in many of the ancient rituals for receiving non-Christian converts into the Catholic Church.

Owing to the enduring potential for confusion and misunderstanding because of the divergence of English usage from the original Latin meaning, Pope John XXIII ordered that the Latin adjective "perfidis" be dropped from the Good Friday prayer for the Jews; in 1960 he ordered it removed from all rituals for the reception of converts. As part of the revision of the Roman Missal, the prayer was completely rewritten. The current prayer of the Roman Liturgy for Good Friday prays for "the Jewish people, first to hear the word of God, that they may continue to grow in the love of His name and in faithfulness to His covenant."

=== Jewish deicide ===
In 1962, Pope John XXIII opened the Second Vatican Council, a pastoral ecumenical council of the Catholic Church. It closed under Pope Paul VI in 1965. One of the most revolutionary changes that resulted from interpretations of this council's documents concerned the Church's attitude to Jews and Judaism.

Among other things, the Second Vatican Council addressed the charge of Jewish deicide, repudiating the belief in the collective Jewish guilt for the crucifixion of Jesus stating that, even though some Jewish authorities and those who followed them called for Jesus' death, the blame for what happened cannot be laid at the door of all Jews living at that time, nor can the Jews in our time be held guilty. The council issued the declaration Nostra aetate ("In Our Time"), which reads in part:

True, the Jewish authorities and those who followed their lead pressed for the death of Christ; still, what happened in His passion cannot be charged against all the Jews, without distinction, then alive, nor against the Jews of today. The Jews should not be presented as rejected or accursed by God, as if this followed from the Holy Scriptures. All should see to it, then, that in catechetical work or in the preaching of the word of God they do not teach anything that does not conform to the truth of the Gospel and the spirit of Christ.

=== Modern Initiatives for Catholic–Jewish Reconciliation ===
To further the goal of reconciliation, the Catholic Church in 1971 established an internal International Catholic-Jewish Liaison Committee and the International Jewish Committee for Interreligious Consultations. (This Committee is not a part of the Church's Magisterium.)

On May 4, 2001, at the 17th meeting of the International Liaison Committee in New York, Church officials stated that they would change how Judaism is dealt with in Catholic seminaries and schools. In part, they stated:

The curricula of Catholic seminaries and schools of theology should reflect the central importance of the Church's new understanding of its relationship to Jews. ... Courses on Bible, developments by which both the Church and rabbinic Judaism emerged from early Judaism will establish a substantial foundation for ameliorating "the painful ignorance of the history and traditions of Judaism of which only negative aspects and often caricature seem to form part of the stock ideas of many Christians. (See notes on the "Correct Way to Present Jews and Judaism in Catholic Preaching and Catechesis", #27, 1985)

... Courses dealing with the biblical, historical and theological aspects of relations between Jews and Christians should be an integral part of the seminary and theologate curriculum, and not merely electives. All who graduate from Catholic seminaries and theology schools should have studied the revolution in Catholic teaching on Jews and Judaism from Nostra aetate to the prayer of Pope John Paul II in Jerusalem at the Western Wall on March 26, 2000. ... For historic reasons, many Jews find it difficult to overcome generational memories of anti-Semitic oppression. Therefore: Lay and Religious Jewish leaders need to advocate and promote a program of education in our Jewish schools and seminaries – about the history of Catholic-Jewish relations and knowledge of Christianity and its relationship to Judaism. ... Encouragement of dialogue between the two faiths does involve recognition, understanding and respect for each other's beliefs, without having to accept them. It is particularly important that Jewish schools teach about the Second Vatican Council, and subsequent documents and attitudinal changes that opened new perspectives and possibilities for both faiths.

In October 2015 the Catholic Church in Poland published a letter referring to antisemitism as a sin against the commandment to love one's neighbor. The letter also acknowledged the heroism of those Poles who risked their lives to shelter Jews as Nazi Germany carried out the Holocaust in occupied Poland. The bishops who signed the letter cited the Polish Pope John Paul II who was opposed to antisemitism, and believed in founding Catholic-Jewish relations.

In 2015, the Vatican Commission for Religious Relations with the Jews released a theological reflection that, while rejecting the idea of "two different paths toward salvation, the Jewish path without Christ and the path with the Christ", and calling on Christians to "bear witness to their faith in Jesus Christ ... in a humble and sensitive manner" to Jewish people, acknowledged that Jews were "participants in God's salvation" and that the Church views evangelization to Jews "in a different manner from that to people of other religions and world views", rejected the principle of an institutional Jewish mission, and called on Catholics to fight antisemitism.

== Jewish responses ==
=== Orthodox Rabbinic Statement on Christianity ===
On 3 December 2015, fifty years after the issue of Nostra aetate, the Israel-based Center for Jewish-Christian Understanding and Cooperation (CJCUC) spearheaded a petition of orthodox rabbis from around the world calling for increased partnership between Jews and Christians. The unprecedented Orthodox Rabbinic Statement on Christianity, entitled "To Do the Will of Our Father in Heaven: Toward a Partnership between Jews and Christians", was initially signed by over 25 prominent Orthodox rabbis in Israel, United States and Europe and now has over 60 signatories.

=== Between Jerusalem and Rome ===
On 31 August 2017, representatives of the Conference of European Rabbis, the Rabbinical Council of America, and the Commission of the Chief Rabbinate of Israel issued and presented the Holy See with a statement entitled Between Jerusalem and Rome. The document pays particular tribute to the Second Vatican Council's Declaration Nostra aetate, whose fourth chapter represents the Magna Charta of the Holy See's dialogue with the Jewish world. Between Jerusalem and Rome does not hide the theological differences that exist between the two faith traditions while all the same it expresses a firm resolve to collaborate more closely, now and in the future.

== Significant outstanding issues ==
=== Pius XII ===
Some Jewish groups and historians have said Pope Pius XII, who was Pope from 1939 to 1958, stayed silent during the Holocaust and did not do enough to save lives. They have sought access to Vatican World War II era archives to determine whether or not Pope Pius XII did enough to help Jews before or during the war, or whether he held some sympathy for the Nazi regime. The Vatican has until 2020 maintained a policy of allowing only partial access to the archives.

Jewish groups and historians have argued for years that the Vatican should not move forward with Pius' beatification until the Vatican's full wartime archives were opened.

On 2 March 2020, the Vatican opened to historians its archives relating to Pope Pius XII.

=== The Church's repentance ===
In addition, although the Jewish community appreciated John Paul II's 1994 statement, We Remember: A Reflection on the Shoah, which offered a mea culpa for the role of Christians in the Holocaust, some Jewish groups felt that the statement was insufficient, as it focused on individual members of the Church who helped the Nazis, portraying them as acting against the teachings of the Church.

Some critics consider the statement irresponsible, because it absolved the Church of any blame. Lingering disputes also remain about some of the practical aftereffects of the Holocaust, including the question of how to deal with Jewish children who were baptized during the Second World War and were never returned to their Jewish families and people.

=== Traditionalist Catholics ===
Traditionalist Catholics who are particularly devoted to the ancient traditions of the Church, and reject many of the changes made since the discovery of the Dead Sea Scrolls and the Second Vatican Council, or regard it as an invalid Council, view interfaith dialogue with Jews as unnecessary and potentially leading to a "watering-down" of the Catholic faith. The Good Friday prayer for the Jews has been a point of particular contention.

=== Arab Catholics ===
Continuing tensions in the Middle East impacts on relations between Jews and Catholics in the region and beyond. Relations with Arab Christians in Lebanon, Jordan and Syria often parallel those relations with Arab Muslims and remain difficult, especially with regards to the question of anti-zionism and Zionism.

=== The media's treatment of the Church ===
In a May 2002 interview with the Italian-Catholic publication 30 Giorni, Honduran Cardinal Oscar Maradiaga claimed that Jews influenced the media to exploit the recent controversy regarding sexual abuse by Catholic priests in order to divert attention from the Israeli-Palestinian crisis. This provoked outrage from the Anti-Defamation League, especially since Maradiaga has a reputation as a moderate and that he is regarded as a papabile. The high-profile Don Pierino Gelmini of Italy, himself personally accused of sexually abusing a number of young men, put the blame on a nebulous "Jewish radical chic" in an interview with the Corriere della Sera. He later apologized and shifted the blame onto the Freemasons. The bishop Giacomo Babini described the scandal's exposure as a refined "Zionist attack" in an April 2010 newspaper interview.

=== Catholics in Israel ===
The legal system provides for freedom of religion in Israel, and the state recognizes non-Jewish minority religious communities, including Catholics, and allocates funding for the provision of the religious needs of their members. However, in comparison to funding for Orthodox Jewish requirements, minority religious communities do not receive a proportional allocation, in what is viewed as discrimination against these minorities. Recognized religious communities, including Catholics, are granted official status and authority, notably in matters of marriage, burial, and divorce.

Despite legal protections for religious minorities, there have been incidents of anti-Christian attacks, including spitting, and so-called "price tag" attacks by violent Jewish extremists vandalizing and damaging Christian property, notably in 2012, at the Catholic monastery at Latrun and the entrance to the Church of the Dormition on Mount Zion, in 2013 at a Catholic abbey, and in 2014, an attack at the Notre Dame of Jerusalem Center, the local headquarters of the Catholic Church.

The Catholic Church of the Multiplication of the Loaves and Fish at Tabgha, in northern Israel was damaged by arson in 2015 and sixteen yeshiva students were arrested over suspected involvement in the religiously motivated attack.

=== Intermarriage ===
Pope Francis' Amoris laetitia or The Joy of Love, addresses the issue of interfaith marriages. While marriages of Catholics to non-Catholics are viewed as "mixed marriages", Francis calls marriages to non-Christians, including Jews, "a privileged place for inter religious dialogue." Piero Stefani, a scholar at the Facoltà Teologica del Nord Italia, a Church-owned institute, noted, "The Church is no longer endorsing a policy of missionary conversion, especially toward Jews. So interfaith marriages are seen as an 'opportunity' to start a positive dialogue [about faith] with the non-Catholic spouse, rather than an occasion to convert him or her."

Intermarriage of Jews is rare in Israel and among the Orthodox. In the U.S., Jewish intermarriage is common, and those who do intermarry with someone of a different religion are more likely to marry a Catholic than a mainline Protestant, but are about as likely to marry Catholics (9%) and Protestants overall (10%), and more likely to intermarry with those who are unaffiliated (11%).

== See also ==
- Antisemitism in the Arab world
- Antisemitism in Christianity
- Antisemitism in Islam
- Catholicism and Zionism
- Catholic Church and Islam
- Catholic Church in Israel
- Christianity and other religions
  - Christianity and Islam
  - Christianity and Judaism
    - Christian–Jewish reconciliation
    - Christian observances of Jewish holidays
    - Christian Zionism
- Christianity in Israel
- Christianity in the Middle East
- Hebrew Catholics
- History of Christian thought on persecution and tolerance
- Holy See–Israel relations
- Interfaith dialogue
- Jewish views on Jesus
- Jewish views on religious pluralism
- Judaism and Mormonism
- Judaizers
- Jules Isaac
- Opposition to antisemitism
- Papal Jews
- Philosemitism
- Pope John XXIII and Judaism
- Pope John Paul II and Judaism
- Protestantism and Judaism
- Relations between the Orthodox Church and Judaism
- Religious antisemitism
- Roman Jews
- Supersessionism

== Bibliography ==
- Ain, Stewart. "Staying The Course: John Paul II built a closeness between the Vatican and Jewish community, and Jewish leaders don't expect that to change", The Jewish Week, April 8, 2005
- Becker, Adam H.; Reed, Annette Yoshiko (2003). The Ways that Never Parted: Jews and Christians in Late Antiquity and the Early Middle Ages. Mohr Siebeck. ISBN 978-3-16-147966-3.
- Ben Yoḥanan, Karma (2022). Jacob's Younger Brother: Christian-Jewish Relations after Vatican II. Cambridge, MA: Harvard University Press. ISBN 9780674276352.
- Blainey, Geoffrey (2011). A Short History of Christianity. Penguin Books. ISBN 9780670075249.
- Leighton, Christopher M.; Arian, Charles (1999). "Jewish-Christian Dialogue". In Fahlbusch, Erwin; Bromiley, Geoffrey William (eds.). The Encyclopedia of Christianity. Wm. B. Eerdmans Publishing. pp. 55–64. ISBN 978-90-04-12654-1.
- Cunningham, Philip A.; Hofmann, Norbert Johannes; Sievers, Joseph (2007). The Catholic Church and the Jewish People: Recent Reflections from Rome. Fordham Univ Press. ISBN 978-0-8232-2805-8.
- Flannery, Edward H. (1985). The Anguish of the Jews: Twenty-three Centuries of Antisemitism. Paulist Press. ISBN 978-0-8091-4324-5.
- Johnson, Paul (1994) [1987]. A History of the Jews. London: Orion Books Limited, Orion House. ISBN 1-85799-096-X.
- Garroway, Joshua (2021). "The Jewish Diaspora in Christian Thinking". In Diner, Hasia R. (ed.). The Oxford handbook of the Jewish diaspora. New York, NY: Oxford University Press. pp. 99–116. ISBN 9780197554807.
- Gubbay Helfer, S. (2014). "Rome Among the Bishops: An Immigrant Jew Explores The Unknown Worlds of French Canada." Canadian Jewish Studies Études Juives Canadiennes, 20(1). https://doi.org/10.25071/1916-0925.36099
- Lipman, Steve. "The Jewish Critique: Amid the pope's remarkable record on the Jews, issues linger", The Jewish Week, April 8, 2005.
- Kertzer, David, "The Kidnapping of Edgardo Mortara", Knopf, New York, 1997.
- Kertzer, David, "The Popes against the Jews", Alfred A. Knopf, New York, 2001.
- Rist, Rebecca (2016). Popes and Jews, 1095-1291. Oxford University Press. ISBN 978-0-19-871798-0.
- Saraiva, António José (2001). The Marrano Factory: The Portuguese Inquisition and Its New Christians. Translated by Salomon, Herman Prins; Sassoon, Isaac S. D. Leiden: Brill.
- Segal, Alan F. (1986). Rebecca's Children: Judaism and Christianity in the Roman World. Harvard University Press. ISBN 978-0-674-75076-0.
- Simonsohn, Shlomo (1988). The Apostolic See and the Jews, Documents: 492-1404. Pontifical Institute of Mediaeval Studies.
- Stow, Kenneth R. (1972). "The Burning of the Talmud in 1553, in the Light of Sixteenth Century Catholic Attitudes Toward the Talmud". Bibliothèque d'Humanisme et Renaissance. 34 (3): 435–459. ISSN 0006-1999. JSTOR 20674961.
