= Jennifer Lauret =

French actress

- Born: 1 January 1980 (age 46); Toulouse, France
- Years active: 1988 - present
- Height: 1.63 m (5 ft 4 in)

Jennifer Lauret (French: [ʒɛnifɛʁ loʁɛ]) is an actress in French language cinema. She has starred in several television series and movies, including Amour et confusions, Julie Lescaut and more.

== Biography ==
In 1986, Lauret began her career as a child actress in a television commercial for Barbie dolls, followed in 1989 by a secondary role in the television series Marc et Sophie, and in theater with actors such as Patrick Chesnais and more.

Her career finally took off with the role of Penelope in Patrick Braoudé's Génial, mes parents divorcent (Brilliant, my parents are divorced). She then won numerous roles on television, most notably Une famille formidable (A marvelous family) and Julie Lescaut with the respective roles of Frédérique Beaumont and Sarah (the eldest daughter Julie Lescaut).

She has given birth to four daughters, Shaana, Carla, Anna, and Nell.

== Filmography ==
=== Movies ===
- Génial, mes parents divorcent (1991) by Patrick Braoudé : Pénélope
- Amour et confusions (1997) by Patrick Braoudé : Girl in love
- Une femme très très très amoureuse (1997) by Ariel Zeitoun : Judith

=== Telefilms ===
- 2 bis, rue de la Combine (1992)
- Cœur à prendre (1994) : Valérie Bouquet
- Passé sous silence (1994) : Cécile jeune
- Bonne fête papa (1997) : Marion
- La Fine équipe (1997) : Vanessa
- Une leçon particulière (1997) : Vanessa
- Robinson Crusoé (2003) : Isabella at 20 years old
- Camping Paradis (2006): Ariane Leroy
- Camping Paradis 2 (2008): Ariane Leroy

=== Series ===
- Marc et Sophie (1988–1990) : Niece in the concierge
- Hôtel de police - episode Flic, impair et casse (1990)
- Une famille formidable (1992- present) : Frédérique Beaumont
- Julie Lescaut (1992-2014) : Sarah
- La Rivière Espérance (1995) (feuilleton) : Virginie at 13 years old
- Commissaire Moulin - episode Le petit fugitif (2006): Julie Jonquet
