= Pope Gregory I and Judaism =

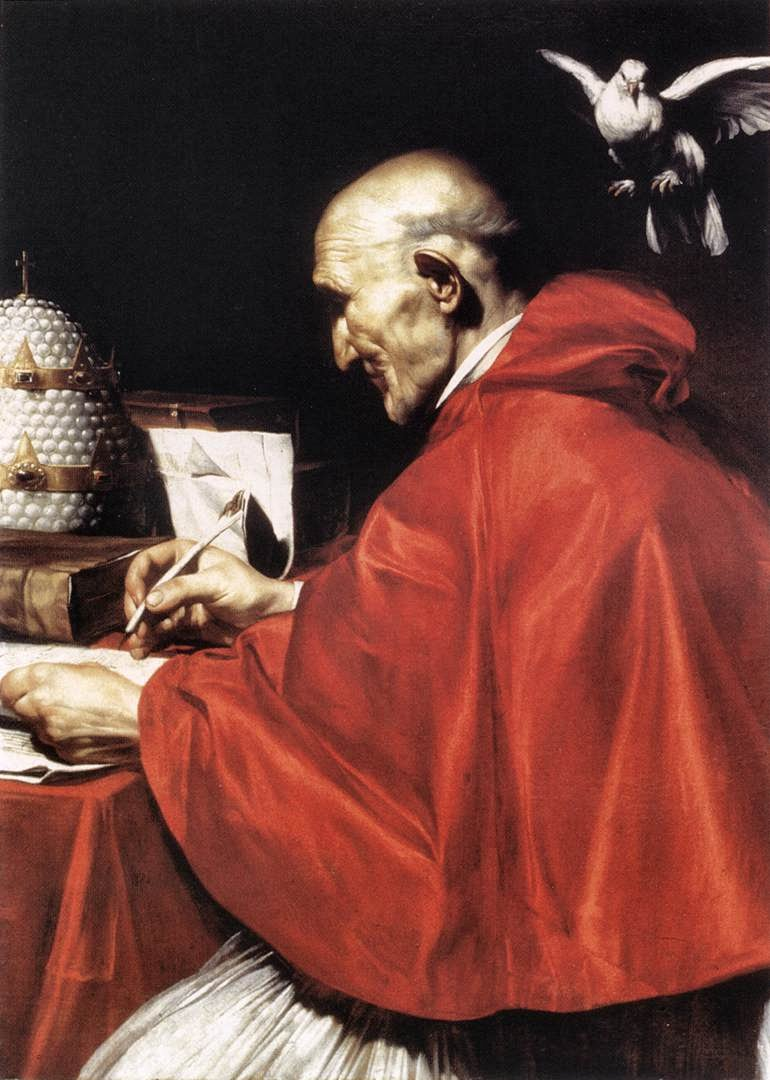
Pope Gregory the Great influenced significantly Christian policy towards Jews throughout the Middle Ages

Pope Gregory I (c.540–604), also known as Gregory the Great, was influential in the formation of Catholic doctrine in relation to the Jews. Based on the theological theories of Paul and Augustine of Hippo, but also existing Roman law, his letters set out the protections and toleration for Jews to exist in a Christian society. Although his sermons portrayed Jews as blind and obstinate, in his twenty letters regarding the Jews, he insisted that they be granted the right to practice their religion and enjoy their legal rights under Roman law, while forbidding forced baptisms. His letter Sicut Judaeis became the basis for later papal protection letters for Jews during the Middle Ages.

== Background ==
Not long after the death of Constantine I in 329, the Roman imperial government initiated restrictive measures against Jewish privileges and proselytism. Influential for later Catholic doctrine was in particular the fifth-century Theodosian code, a compilation of imperial constitutions from the reign of Constantine I (272–337) to Theodosius II (401–450) that were (re-)issued as laws in 438. The code provided a blueprint on how Jews should be treated in a Christian society, including both restrictions (such as forbidding Jews to proselytise or have Christian slaves, exclude them from certain public offices or threatening the curtailment of privileges if Jews insulted Christians) as well as providing them protective basic rights (such as affirming their citizenship, outlawing attacks on synagogues, granting them due legal process and prohibiting arbitrary cancellation of their rights). Importantly, Judaism remained a religio licita and was, as described in the Code, "not a prohibited sect". The papacy insisted on the implementation of the Theodosian Code from the fifth century onwards.

In the fifth century, based on Pauline ideas, Augustine of Hippo had developed the so-called witness theory. In his writings, Augustine argued that the Jews were living, though unknowing witnesses to Christ. Their belief in the Old Testament, which contained prophecies regarding Christ, was a testimony to the truth of Christianity. Further, their dispersion after the destruction of the Second Temple and suffering showed that God had punished them for their rejection of Christ. As such, they played a crucial role in the divine plan for human society's development, as their existence offered a valuable set of arguments for preaching Christianity to pagans. Augustine's teaching and Roman law provided the basis for Gregory's own teachings.

== Gregory's letters ==
Gregory I, a former Roman aristocrat and monk, became pope at the end of the sixth century and thus both a spiritual and temporal leader in a tumultuous time. Over 800 of his letters survive, of which 20 deal with the Jews. His guiding principle was the application of the Theodosian Code which should be done strictly and impartially administered. Specifically significant in this context is his letter to the bishop of Palermo in 598, which Gregory wrote in response to a plea from the Jews of Palermo who had complained about the anti-Jewish activities of the bishop. In the letter, Gregory wrote that just as the Jews were not allowed to pursue more freedoms than Roman law allowed their position, so Christians were not allowed to infringe the rights that Jews had.

=== The position of Jews in society ===
In various epistles, Gregory insisted on the right of Jews to "liberty of action, so far as the law permitted, both in civil affairs and in the worship of the synagogue" (Epistles 1.34; 2.6; 8.25; 9.38; 9.195; 13.15). But Gregory wrote of limiting the Jews from exceeding the rights granted to them under imperial law – particularly in relation to the ownership of Christian slaves (Epistles 2.6; 3.37; 4.9; 4.21; 6.29; 7.21; 8.21; 9.104; 9.213; 9.215).

=== Condemnation of forced conversions ===
In Epistle 1.14, Pope Gregory expressly disapproved of the compulsory baptism of Jews

June 591 : "Censure of Virgil, bishop of Arles, and Theodore, bishop of Marseille, for having baptized Jews by force. They are to desist.

"For it is necessary to gather those who are at odds with the Christian religion the unity of faith by meekness, by kindness, by admonishing, by persuading, lest these...should be repelled by threats and terrors. They ought, therefore, to come together to hear from you the Word of God in a kindly frame of mind, rather than stricken with dread, result of a harshness that goes beyond due limits."

=== Admonition of Paschasius ===
November 602 : "Admonition to Paschasius, bishop of Naples, to ensure that the Jews are not disturbed in the celebration of their religious festivals."

"TO PASCHASIUS, BISHOP OF NAPLES: Those who, with sincere intent, desire to lead people outside the Christian religion to the correct faith, ought to make the effort by means of what is pleasant, not with what is harsh, lest opposition drive afar the mind of men whom reasoning...could have attracted. Those who act otherwise...demonstrate that they are concerned with their own enterprises, rather than with those of God! Now, the Jews dwelling in Naples have registered a complaint with Us, asserting that certain people are attempting, in an unreasonable fashion, to restrain them from some of the solemnities connected with their own feast days, as it has been lawful for them to observe or celebrate these up to now, and for their forefathers from long ages past...For of what use is this, when...it avails nothing toward their faith and conversion?...One must act, therefore, in such a way that...they might desire to follow us rather than to fly from us...Rather let them enjoy their lawful liberty to observe and to celebrate their festivities, as they have enjoyed this up until now."

== Gregory's sermons ==
Contrary to his teachings in his letters, Gregory used more classical imagery of Jews as dark, blind and stubborn believers and complained of the obduracy of the Jews and their stony hearts. It seems that Gregory felt compelled to use this traditional language and to scriptural allegorising in hyperboles. Nevertheless, he did not abandon Pauline teaching of special affection for Israel.

== Legacy ==
Due to Gregory's immense authority, his affirmation of Pauline teaching and the application of Roman law had a significant influence on Catholic policy towards the Jews for the rest of the Middle Ages, though it was often heeded more in principle than in practice. In the letter "Placuit nobis" pope Alexander II praised the Spanish bishops in 1063 for restraining those Christians fighting against Muslims in Spain from also attacking Jews and referenced explicitly Gregory I on forbidding Christians to harm Jews. One of Gregory's letters forbidding forced conversion was considered so important by later canon lawyers that it was included in Gratian’s Concordia discordantium canonum in 1140.

Most importantly was his letter to the bishop of Palermo, which became known by its beginning phrase "Sicut Judaeis", “Just as the Jews”. This letter became the basis for later medieval papal protection letters, the first of which was issued in 1120 by Pope Callixtus II in 1120 in response to violence against Jews during the First Crusade. These letters were issued as bulls between the twelfth and fifteenth century.

== Bibliography ==
- Flannery, Edward H. (1985). The Anguish of the Jews: Twenty-three Centuries of Antisemitism. Paulist Press. ISBN 978-0-8091-4324-5.
- Garroway, Joshua (2021). "The Jewish Diaspora in Christian Thinking". In Diner, Hasia R. (ed.). The Oxford handbook of the Jewish diaspora. New York, NY: Oxford University Press. pp. 99–116. ISBN 9780197554807.
- Rist, Rebecca (2016). Popes and Jews, 1095-1291. Oxford University Press. ISBN 978-0-19-871798-0.
- Simonsohn, Shlomo (1988). The Apostolic See and the Jews, Documents: 492-1404. Pontifical Institute of Mediaeval Studies.
