= Cargas =

Cargas is a surname. Notable people with the surname include:

- Harry J. Cargas (1932–1998), American Holocaust scholar

== See also ==
- Vargas (surname)
