= Steve Suissa =

French film director

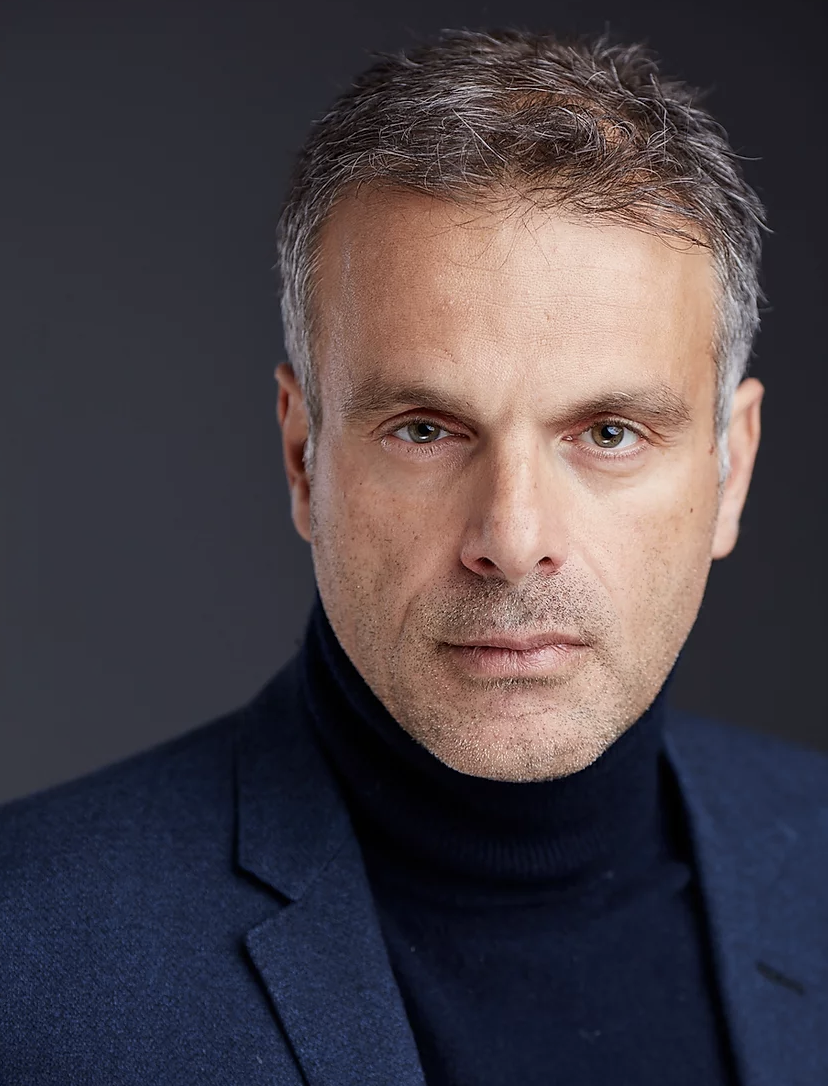
- Suissa in 2019.
- Born: 7 December 1970 (age 55); Paris, France
- Occupations: Stage & film director, actor
- Years active: 1990-present

Steve Suissa (born 7 December 1970) is a French stage and film director and actor. His 2000 film Taking Wing was entered into the 22nd Moscow International Film Festival where he won the award for Best Director.

== Theater ==
=== As actor ===
Year	Title	Writer	Director
1991	Summer and Smoke	Tennessee Williams	Gilles Gleizes
1991	Les Nuits de Terayama	Shūji Terayama	Nicolas Bataille
1992-93	Sabato, domenica e lunedi	Eduardo De Filippo	Françoise Petit
1993	The Seagull	Anton Chekhov	Isabelle Nanty
1995	Orpheus Descending	Tennessee Williams	Jacques Mornas
1998	The Widow's Blind Date	Israel Horovitz	Pierre-Olivier Mornas
1998	27 Wagons Full of Cotton	Tennessee Williams	Henri Lazarini
2015-16	Une folie	Sacha Guitry	Francis Huster

=== As director ===
Year	Title	Writer
2005	Barefoot in the Park	Neil Simon
2007	Money	Alain Schwarzstein
2007	Une liaison pornographique	Philippe Blasband
2007-08	La Femme rompue	Simone de Beauvoir
2008	Ma femme s'appelle Maurice	Raffy Shart
2012-13	A Bronx Tale	Chazz Palminteri
2012-13	The Diary of a Young Girl	Anne Frank
2013	The Magic Flute	Wolfgang Amadeus Mozart
2013-14	The Guitrys	Éric-Emmanuel Schmitt
2013-15	Mass Appeal	Bill C. Davis
2013-18	Miss Carpenter	Marianne James & Sébastien Marnier
2014	Si on recommençait	Éric-Emmanuel Schmitt
2014	La Trahison d’Einstein	Éric-Emmanuel Schmitt
2014-16	The Royal Game	Stefan Zweig
2014-16	Georges et Georges	Éric-Emmanuel Schmitt
2015	Hibernatus	Jean Bernard-Luc
2015	Oscar et la Dame rose	Éric-Emmanuel Schmitt
2015-16	L’Élixir d’amour	Éric-Emmanuel Schmitt
2015-17	Avanti !	Samuel A. Taylor
2015-17	24h de la vie d’une femme	Stefan Zweig
2016	Le Mystère Bizet	Éric-Emmanuel Schmitt
2016-17	Amok	Stefan Zweig
2016-18	À droite à gauche	Laurent Ruquier
2016-18	Michel Drucker - Seul... avec vous	Michel Drucker
2017-19	Samia	Gilbert Ponté
2017-19	Horowitz	Francis Huster
2017-19	Le Théâtre, ma vie	Francis Huster
2018	Passionnément Toscanini	Francis Huster
2018-19	Pourvu qu’il soit heureux	Laurent Ruquier
2018-20	Ich bin Charlotte	Doug Wright
2019	Le Plus Beau dans tout ça	Laurent Ruquier
2019-20	A Bronx Tale	Chazz Palminteri
2019-20	The Sunflower	Simon Wiesenthal
2020	Transmission	Bill C. Davis
2022	Ich bin Charlotte	Doug Wright
2022	Moi aussi j’ai vécu	Hélios Azoulay
2022-23	The Sunflower	Simon Wiesenthal
2022-24	Sélectionné	Marc Élya

== Filmography ==
=== As actor ===
Year	Title	Role	Director	Notes
1990	Nouvelle Vague	The waiter	Jean-Luc Godard	
1991	La tribu	An intern	Yves Boisset	
1994	Neuf mois	Ambulance man	Patrick Braoudé	
1994	Les Cordier, juge et flic	Jacky	Alain Bonnot	TV series (1 episode)
1994	Van Loc: un grand flic de Marseille	Dany	Claude Barrois	TV series (1 episode)
1995	L'affaire Dreyfus	The camp's helper	Yves Boisset	TV movie
1996	Nous sommes tous des anges	An Italian	Simon Lelouch	Short
1996	Commandant Nerval	The Lock	Henri Helman	TV series (1 episode)
1997	Amour et confusions	Guard	Patrick Braoudé	
1997	Clueur	Clueur	Nicolas Bazz	Short
1997	Le juste	Nicola Carbini	Franck Apprederis	TV series (1 episode)
1997	Maître Da Costa	Alex Patche	Nicolas Ribowski	TV series (1 episode)
1997-98	Navarro	Xavier / Delcourt	Nicolas Ribowski	TV series (2 episodes)
1998	Ronin	Waiter in Nice	John Frankenheimer	
1999	Le roi en son moulin	Aupestre	Jacob Berger	TV movie
1999	P.J.	Pascal	Frédéric Krivine	TV series (1 episode)
2000	Taking Wing	Joseph	Steve Suissa	
2002	Vertiges	Julien	Steve Suissa	TV series (1 episode)
2003	Une employée modèle	The rocker	Jacques Otmezguine	
2003	Comme si de rien n'était	Benoit	Pierre-Olivier Mornas	
2003	Le bison (et sa voisine Dorine)	Sitcom actor	Isabelle Nanty	
2003	De soie et de cendre	Roberto	Jacques Otmezguine	TV movie
2003	Blague à part	Dr. Roméo	Olivier Barma	TV series (1 episode)
2004	Le grand rôle	Doron	Steve Suissa	
2005	Edy	Bar client	Stéphan Guérin-Tillié	
2005	Cavalcade	Antoine	Steve Suissa	
2005	Trois couples en quête d'orages	Cances	Jacques Otmezguine	
2005	Zooloo	Nemo	Nicolas Bazz	Short
2008	A Man and His Dog	The patient's son	Francis Huster	
2009	Mensch	Joseph Hazak	Steve Suissa	
2010	Enquêtes réservées	Launay	Bruno Garcia	TV series (1 episode)
2013	Victor Young Perez	Benjamin Perez	Jacques Ouaniche	
2014	Léo Matteï, brigade des mineurs	Christophe Fabre	David Morley	TV series (1 episode)
2023	Croisement Gaza Bd St Germain	Patrick Mendes	Jacques Ouaniche	TV mini-series

=== As filmmaker ===
Year	Title	Notes
2000	Taking Wing	Moscow International Film Festival - Best Director; Moscow International Film Festival - FIPRESCI Prize - Special Mention; Nominated - Moscow International Film Festival - Golden St. George
2001	Elle pleure pas	Short
2002	Vertiges	TV series (1 episode)
2003	Carnets d'ado	TV series (1 episode)
2004	Le grand rôle	Nominated - Festival du Film de Paris - Grand Prix
2005	Cavalcade	
2009	Mensch	
