= Bernd Michael Lade =

German actor and director (born 1964)

Bernd Michael Lade (born 24 December 1964) is a German actor and director. A native of Berlin, he is perhaps best known to audiences outside Germany for his role opposite Peter Sodann in several series of the crime drama Tatort. Lade's ex-wife is actress Maria Simon, with whom he has three children.
