= Cum nimis absurdum =

1555 papal bull issued by Pope Paul IV

Cum nimis absurdum Latin for 'Since it is absurd' Papal bull of Pope Paul IV
- Signature date: 14 July 1555
- Subject: On the Jews in Rome
- Text: In English

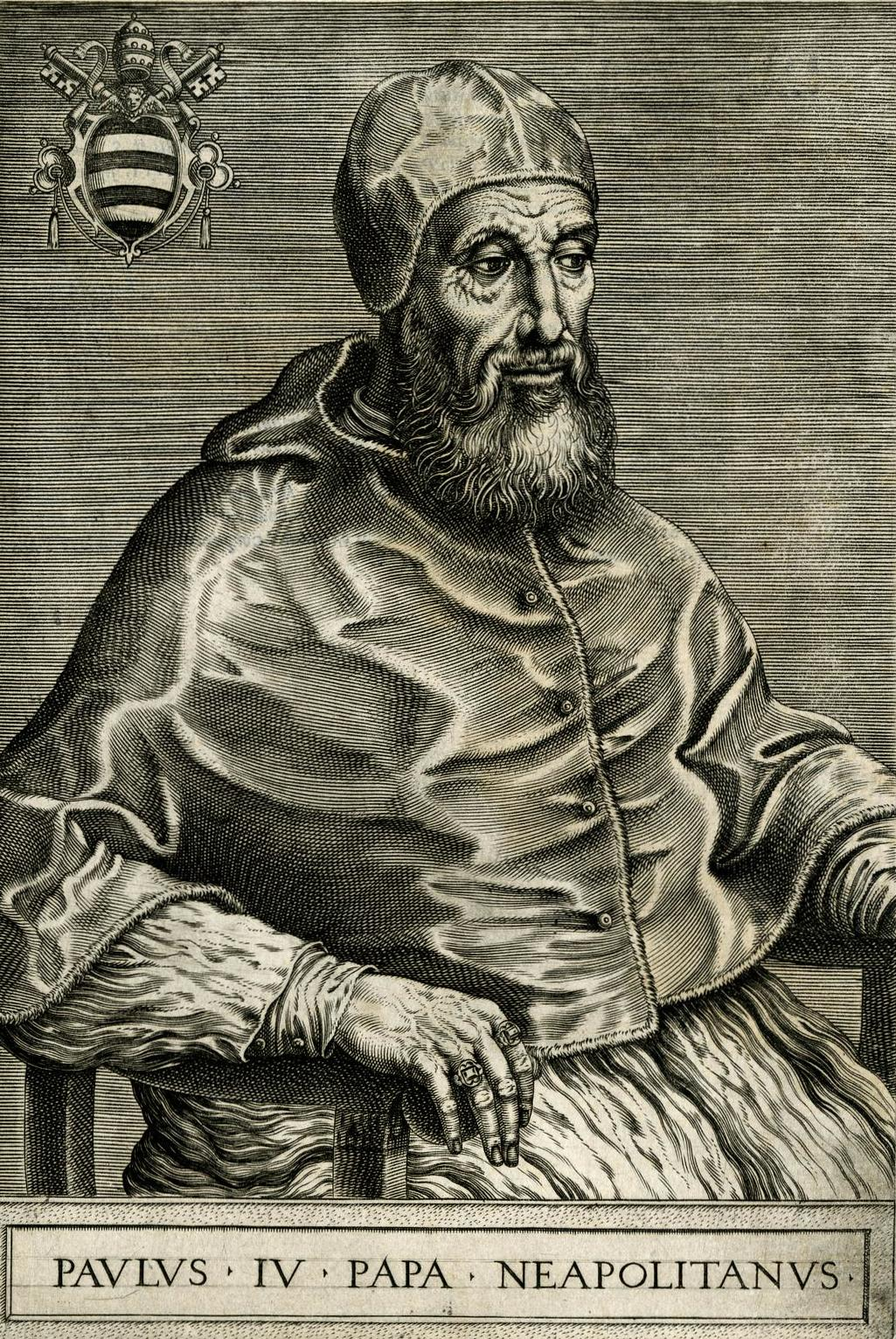
Pope Paul IV

Cum nimis absurdum was a papal bull issued by Pope Paul IV dated 14 July 1555. In order to incentivise Jewish conversion to Christianity, the bull revoked all the rights of the Jewish community and placed religious and economic restrictions on Jews in the Papal States, renewed anti-Jewish legislation and subjected Jews to various degradations and restrictions on their personal freedom.

The bull established the Roman Ghetto and required the Jews of Rome, who had existed as a community since before Christian times and numbered about 2,000 at the time, to live in it. The Ghetto was a walled quarter with three gates that were locked at night. Under the bull, Jewish males were required to wear a pointed yellow hat, and Jewish females a yellow kerchief. Jews were required to attend compulsory Catholic sermons on the Jewish shabbat.

The bull also subjected Jews to various other restrictions such as a prohibition on property ownership and practising medicine among Christians. Jews were allowed to practice only unskilled jobs, as rag men, secondhand dealers or fish mongers. They could also be pawnbrokers.

Paul IV's successor, Pius IV, enforced the creation of other ghettos in most Italian towns, and his successor, Pius V, recommended them to other bordering states. The Papal States ceased to exist on 20 September 1870 when they were incorporated in the Kingdom of Italy, but the requirement that Jews live in the ghetto was formally abolished only in 1882, though, in this period between the end of the Papal States and the requirement abolition, this requirement was seldom, if ever enforced.

== Background ==
Gian Pietro Carafa was 79 years old when he assumed the papacy as Pope Paul IV, and was by all accounts austere, rigidly orthodox, and authoritarian in manner. As a cardinal, he had persuaded Pope Paul III to establish a Roman Inquisition, modelled on the Spanish Inquisition with himself as one of the Inquisitors-General. Carafa vowed, "Even if my own father were a heretic, I would gather the wood to burn him."

In September 1553, Cardinal Carafa had overseen the burning of the Talmud in Rome. Deutsch and Jacobs link this to part of the reaction to the Protestant Reformation that led to censorship of books deemed detrimental to Christians.

== Content ==
Two months after becoming Pope, Paul IV issued Cum nimis absurdum. As temporal ruler of the Papal States it applied to those areas over which he had direct control. It takes its name from its first words:

Since it is absurd and utterly inconvenient that the Jews, who through their own fault were condemned by God to eternal slavery, can, under the pretext that pious Christians must accept them and sustain their habitation, be so ungrateful to Christians, as, instead of thanks for gracious treatment, they return contumely, and among themselves, instead of the slavery, which they deserve, they manage to claim superiority: we, who newly learned that these very Jews have insolently invaded our City Rome and a number of the Papal States, territories and domains their impudence increased so much that they dare not only to live amongst the Christian people, but also in the vicinity of the churches without any difference of dressing, and even that they rent houses in the main streets and squares, buy and hold immovable property, engage maids, nurses and other Christian servants, and commit other and numerous misdeeds with shame and contempt of the Christian name. Considering that the Church of Rome tolerates these very Jews, evidence of the true Christian faith, and to this end [we declare]: that they, won over by the piety and kindness of the See, should at long last recognize their erroneous ways, and should lose no time in seeing the true light of the catholic faith, and thus to agree that while they persist in their errors, realizing that they are slaves because of their deeds, whereas Christians have been freed through our Lord God Jesus Christ, and that it is iniquitous for it to appear that the sons of free women serve the sons of maids.

=== Provisions ===
Paul IV sought to strictly enforce earlier canonical restrictions against the Jews — as those prohibiting their practising medicine among Christians, employing Christian servants, and the like — but he also restricted them in their commercial activity, forbade them to have more than one synagogue in any city, enforced the wearing of the yellow hat, refused to permit a Jew to be addressed as "signor", and finally decreed that they should live in a designated area separated from Christians. The last measure was carried out in Rome with unrelenting cruelty.

According to Herbert Thurston, "[E]dicts issued at various times for the destruction of copies of the Talmud, the Bull 'Cum nimis absurdum' of Paul IV constraining the Jews of Rome to live segregated in a Ghetto and subject to other harassing disabilities, represent ... the prejudices of individual pontiffs ..."

There was to be no more than one synagogue in each state, territory and domain. The bull forbade the construction of new synagogues and decreed the demolition of any others beyond the one permitted. Furthermore, Jews were not allowed to own real property and were required to sell those properties which they then owned within a set period of time. These restrictions contradicted a precedent set as early as 598, by Gregory I which clearly laid down that the Jews were to be allowed to keep their own festivals and religious practices, and their rights of property, even in the case of their synagogues.

Paul IV restated a canon of the Fourth Council of the Lateran of 1215 that required Jews and Muslims to wear something to distinguish them from Christians, and Paul required that Jews wear some distinguishing sign, yellow in color.

They were forbidden to have Christian nurses, maids or servants, nor Christian wet-nurses. They were prohibited from working or having work done on Sundays or on other public feast days declared by the Church, or from fraternizing in any way with Christians.

Jews were limited to the trade of rag-picking, and were not to trade in grain, barley, or any other commodity essential to human welfare. Nor were they to use other than Latin or Italian words in short-term account books that they held with Christians, and, if they did so, such records would not be binding on Christians in legal proceedings. In spite of these restrictions, Serena di Nepi demonstrates that Jewish bankers remained actively involved with Christian partners in a variety of activities, including the purchase and sale of real estate.

Moreover, Jews who were physicians were not to attend or treat, even if summoned, any Christians, and they were not to be addressed as superiors even by poor Christians.

The bull also listed restrictions on loan practices. Collateral, put up as temporary security for their money, was not to be sold unless such goods were put up a full eighteen months prior to the day on which such collateral would be forfeit. At the expiration of the specified number of months, if Jews sold a security deposit, they were to remit all money in excess of the principal of the loan to the owner of the collateral.

=== Purpose and impact ===
The measures were aimed at bringing about Jewish conversions. "These policies were easier to enforce in the Papal States, where the Pope had executive power, as well as elsewhere in Italy, where the papacy had influence. Beyond Italy, though, the provisions of the bull were largely ignored." In Poland, Church officials never proposed segregation of the Jews, as such a measure would not have been supported by the king or the nobles.

Serena di Nepi argues that "in spite of the increasing implosion of the Jewish world of Rome, imposed by papal policy, which imposed exclusion and enclosure, the Jews of Rome were able to hold steadfast to an identity, preserve a specificity and defend themselves against persisting attempts to convert them through active proselytism and social exclusion calculated to erode their adherence to their Jewish faith."

== See also ==
- Jewish ghettos in Europe
- Sicut Judaeis, an earlier papal bull with a more tolerant position on Jews
- Yellow badge

== Sources ==
- Bice Migliau and Micaela Procaccia with Silvia Rebuzzi and Micaela Vitale, Lazio Jewish Itineraries: Places, History, and Art, trans. Gus Barker. Venice: Marsilio, 1997.
- Berger, David (1979). "Cum Nimis Absurdum and the Conversion of the Jews". Jewish Quarterly Review. New Series. 70 (1): 41–49. doi:10.2307/1454606. JSTOR 1454606.
- Stow, Kenneth R. (1977). Catholic Thought and Papal Jewry Policy 1555–1593. New York: The Jewish Theological Seminary of America. ISBN 978-0873340014.
