= Angry Kisses =

2000 film

- Directed by: Judith Kennel
- Written by: Judith Kennel; Markus Imhoof
- Starring: Jürgen Vogel; Maria Simon; Julia Jentsch
- Cinematography: Sophie Maintigneux
- Release date: January 2000
- Running time: 94 minutes
- Countries: Switzerland; Germany
- Language: German

Angry Kisses (German: Zornige Küsse) is a 2000 Swiss drama film directed by Judith Kennel. Set at a Catholic girls’ boarding school, it follows a teenage girl who resists the school’s authority. The film was later screened at festivals including Solothurn and Locarno. Maria Simon won the Best Actress award at the 22nd Moscow International Film Festival.

== Synopsis ==
Lea is sent against her will to a Catholic girls’ boarding school, where she refuses to adapt or submit. With her new friend Katrin, she devises a plan to seduce a young priest and then accuse him of sexual harassment, hoping the scandal will get them out of the school. But their scheme does not go as intended.

== Cast ==
The cast includes:

- Jürgen Vogel as Pfarrer Bachmann
- Maria Simon as Lea Hauser
- Julia Jentsch as Katrin
- Adina Vetter as Theres
- Katharina Quast as Ursula

== Production ==
Zornige Küsse was Judith Kennel’s first feature-length film. In writing and directing the film, she drew on her own boarding-school experience.

== Reception ==
=== Awards ===
Maria Simon won the Best Actress award at the 22nd Moscow International Film Festival in 2000 for her performance in Zornige Küsse. At the Festival International du Film d'Amour de Mons, the film won the Coup du coeur award in 2001.

=== Critical response ===
Filmdienst praised the film as a well-acted debut feature and highlighted its screenplay, irony, and milieu depiction. Filmbulletin praised the performances of Maria Simon and Jürgen Vogel and described the film as sensitive and emotionally engaging.

== Festival screenings ==
The film premiered in January 2000. It was later screened at the Solothurn Film Festival in 2000, the Moscow International Film Festival in 2000, the Locarno Film Festival in 2000, the Internationale Hofer Filmtage in 2000, the International Women’s Film Festival Dortmund|Cologne in 2001, and the Festival International du Film d'Amour de Mons in 2001.
