= The Sunflower (book) =

1969 book on the Holocaust by Simon Wiesenthal

The Sunflower: On the Possibilities and Limits of Forgiveness
- Author: Simon Wiesenthal
- Genre: Philosophy, memoir
- Published: 1969
- Publisher: Opera Mundi
- ISBN: 0805241450

The Sunflower: On the Possibilities and Limits of Forgiveness is a book on the Holocaust by Holocaust survivor Simon Wiesenthal, in which he recounts his experience with a mortally wounded Nazi during World War II. The book describes Wiesenthal's experience in the Lemberg concentration camp near Lviv and discusses the moral ethics of the decisions he made.

The title comes from Wiesenthal's observation of a German military cemetery, where he saw a sunflower on each grave, and fearing his own placement in an unmarked mass grave. The book's second half is a symposium of answers from various people, including other Holocaust survivors, religious leaders and former Nazis. The book was originally published in German by Opera Mundi in Paris, France in 1969. The first English translation was published in 1970.

== Synopsis ==
In 1943, at the height of both World War II and the Holocaust, a group of forced labourers from the Lemberg concentration camp are sent to a converted army hospital to clear medical waste. Simon Wiesenthal is summoned from this work detail by a nurse to the bedside of a dying Nazi soldier, Karl Seidl (identified only as Karl S. in earlier editions). The soldier tells him he is seeking "a Jew's" forgiveness for a crime that has haunted Seidl since it was committed one year prior. Over a number of hours, Seidl tells Wiesenthal his life story, including joining Hitler Youth and his experiences in the SS. He then confesses to having participated in the destruction, by fire and armaments, of a house full of 300 Jews. He states that as the Jews tried to leap out of windows to escape the burning building, he and the other soldiers gunned them down.

After Seidl finishes his story, he asks Wiesenthal to forgive him. Wiesenthal then leaves the room without saying anything. The next day, the nurse informs Wiesenthal that the soldier has died. The nurse tells him that Seidl has left his belongings to him, but Wiesenthal refuses to take them, telling the nurse to have them sent to Seidl's mother. Wiesenthal ruminates on whether or not he should have forgiven Seidl through the rest of his experiences in the concentration camp system. After the war, he finds Seidl's mother, who in their conversation unintentionally confirms the details of her son's story. Seidl's mother asks him how he knew his son, but Wiesenthal lies and leaves without telling her of her late son's participation in the Holocaust. He then poses the ethical dilemma of whether or not he should have forgiven Seidl to the reader, after which a variety of responses from a diverse group of individuals is given.

== Responses ==
In the latest edition of the book, there are 53 responses given from various people, up from 10 in the original edition. Among respondents to the question are theologians, political leaders, writers, jurists, psychiatrists, human rights activists, Holocaust survivors, former Nazis and victims of attempted genocides in Bosnia, Cambodia, China and Tibet. The responses vary. Some respondents write that forgiveness ought to be awarded for the victims' sake; others respond that it should be withheld. Others do not say definitively whether or not forgiveness was the right thing.

=== List of responses ===
Name	Nationality	Profession	Religion	Response
Sven Alkalaj	Bosnian	Diplomat and politician	Judaism	Uncertain
Jean Améry	Austrian	Essayist; Holocaust survivor	Judaism	Uncertain
Smail Balić	Bosnian-Austrian	Historian	Islam	Uncertain
Moshe Bejski	Israeli; Polish-born	Judge; President of Yad Vashem's Righteous Among the Nations Commission; Holocaust survivor	Judaism	Do not forgive
Alan L. Berger		Professor of Religion and Holocaust studies; Author		Do not forgive
Robert McAfee Brown	American	Minister; Activist; Theologian; Professor of Theology and Ethics; Author	Christianity (Presbyterian)	Uncertain
Harry James Cargas	American	Professor; Holocaust scholar; Author	Christianity (Roman Catholic)	Do not forgive
Robert Coles	American	Author; Psychiatrist; Professor		Do not forgive
The Dalai Lama (Tenzin Gyatso)	Tibetan	Spiritual leader; Activist; Nobel Peace Prize laureate	Buddhism (Tibetan)	Forgive
Eugene J. Fisher		Catholic Bishop; Author; Scholar of Interreligious studies	Christianity (Roman Catholic)	Uncertain
Edward H. Flannery	American	Catholic Priest; Author; Activist against anti-Semitism	Christianity (Roman Catholic)	Forgive
Eva Fleischner		Professor of Religion; Author	Catholic	Do not forgive
Matthew Fox		President of University of Creation Spirituality; Author; Priest	Christianity (Episcopalian); formerly Roman Catholic	Do not forgive
Rebecca Goldstein	American	Philosopher; Author	Judaism (Orthodox)	Do not forgive
Mary Gordon	American	Professor of English, Barnard College; Author	Christianity (Roman Catholic)	Do not forgive
Mark Goulden	British	Journalist; Publisher	Judaism	Do not forgive
Hans Habe	Austrian; Hungarian-born	Author; Publisher; Jewish descent	Christianity (Protestant)	Uncertain
Yossi Klein Halevi	Israeli; American-born	Author; Journalist; Son of Holocaust survivor	Judaism	Uncertain
Arthur Hertzberg	American; Polish-born	Rabbi; Author; Scholar; Activist	Judaism (Conservative)	Do not forgive
Theodore M. Hesburgh	American	Priest; Professor; President of University of Notre Dame	Christianity (Roman Catholic)	Forgive
Abraham Joshua Heschel	American; Polish-born	Rabbi; Theologian; Philosopher; Professor; Author	Judaism (Orthodox, Conservative)	Do not forgive
Susannah Heschel	American	Professor of Jewish Studies at Dartmouth College; Scholar; Daughter of Abraham Joshua Heschel	Judaism	Do not forgive
José Hobday	American	Franciscan nun; Author; has written about Catholic and Native American spirituality; of Seneca, Iroquois and Seminole descent	Christianity (Roman Catholic)	Forgive
Christopher Hollis	British	Journalist; Author; former Member of Parliament	Christianity (Roman Catholic)	Forgive
Rodger Kamenetz	American	Poet; Author; Professor of Religious Studies at Louisiana State University	Judaism	Do not forgive
Cardinal Franz König	Austrian	Cardinal; Archbishop of Vienna; Theologian; Scholar	Christianity (Roman Catholic)	Forgive
Harold S. Kushner	American	Rabbi; Author	Judaism (Conservative)	Do not forgive
Lawrence L. Langer	American	Scholar; Professor; Holocaust analyst; Author		Do not forgive
Primo Levi	Italian	Author; Chemist; Holocaust survivor	Judaism	Do not forgive
Deborah E. Lipstadt	American	Historian; Author; Professor; Holocaust scholar	Judaism	Do not forgive
Franklin H. Littell	American	Holocaust scholar;	Christianity (Methodist)	Do not forgive
Hubert G. Locke		Professor; Holocaust scholar		Uncertain
Erich H. Loewy		Professor of Bioethics, University of California Davis		Can not forgive
Herbert Marcuse	German; American	Philosopher; Sociologist; Political theorist; Author	Judaism	Do not forgive
Martin E. Marty	American	Religious scholar	Christianity (Lutheran)	Forgive
Cynthia Ozick	American	Author	Judaism	Do not forgive
John T. Pawlikowski	American	Priest; Professor of Social Ethics; Advocate for Catholic-Jewish relations	Christianity (Roman Catholic)	Do not forgive
Dennis Prager	American	Author; Theologian	Judaism (Orthodox)	Do not forgive
Dith Pran	American; Cambodian	Photojournalist; survivor of Cambodian genocide; subject of The Killing Fields		Forgive
Terence Prittie	British	Journalist; Author;		Do not forgive
Matthieu Ricard	French	Author; Buddhist Monk; PhD in Molecular Genetics	Buddhism (Tibetan)	Forgive
Joshua Rubenstein		Regional director for Amnesty International USA; Fellow of Russian Studies		Do not forgive
Sidney Shachnow	American; Lithuanian-born	Major General, U.S. Army; Purple Heart Recipient; Green Beret; Holocaust survivor	Judaism	Do not forgive
Dorothee Sölle	German	Theologian; Author	Christianity (Lutheran)	Uncertain
Albert Speer	German	Minister of Armaments and War Production for Nazi Germany; Chief Architect to Adolf Hitler; Nazi party member; Accepted moral responsibility at the Nuremberg trials; known as the "Nazi who said sorry"		Do not forgive
Manès Sperber	Austrian-French	Author; Psychologist	Judaism	Do not forgive
André Stein		Professor; Psychotherapist; Author; Holocaust survivor	Judaism	Do not forgive
Nechama Tec	American; Polish-born	Professor of Sociology; Author; Holocaust survivor	Judaism	Do not forgive
Joseph Telushkin	American	Rabbi; Author	Judaism	Do not forgive
Tzvetan Todorov	Bulgarian; French	Historian; Philosopher; Sociologist; Author		Do not forgive
Desmond Tutu	South African	Social rights activist; Politician; Anglican Bishop; Author	Christianity (Anglican)	Forgive
Arthur Waskow	American	Rabbi; Author; Political activist	Judaism	Do not forgive
Harry Wu	American; Chinese-born	Advocate for human rights in China; survivor of 19 years in Chinese labor camps		Do not forgive
