= Deuxième vie =

- Film poster
- Directed by: Patrick Braoudé
- Screenplay by: Patrick Braoudé; Francis Palluau
- Produced by: Patrick Braoudé; Gérard Gaultier; Yves Marmion
- Starring: Patrick Braoudé; Maria de Medeiros; Daniel Russo
- Cinematography: Philippe Pavans
- Edited by: Catherine Renault
- Music by: Jacques Davidovici
- Production companies: UGC; L'Arbre et la Colombe; Sofica Sofinergie 5 France 3 Cinéma; M6 Films; Centre national du cinéma et de l'image animée Canal+
- Distributed by: UGC Fox Distribution
- Release date: 25 October 2000
- Running time: 100 minutes
- Country: France
- Language: French

Deuxième vie (French for "Second Life") is a 2000 French fantasy comedy directed by Patrick Braoudé. It stars the same Braoudé and focuses on time travel. It is set during the period of the football World Cups of 1982 and 1998.

The shooting took place in Paris and Morocco and it was also operated under the titles Le 11^{e} commandement (The 11th Commandment) and Mon futur et moi (My Future and Me).

== Plot ==
8 July 1982. In World Cup semifinal France was beaten by West Germany in penalty kicks, after leading 3-1 in extra time: It is a national tragedy.

Vincent (Patrick Braoudé), 30 years old, is an immature man. When Laurie (Maria de Medeiros), the woman he loves, asks Vincent to create a family, he is unable to make a decision. He also feels difficult to decide upon resumption of the family business, the association with Forsan (Thierry Lhermitte), his childhood friend, or simply to purchase a single pair of shoes. The same evening he is the victim of a car accident that catapults him 16 years later, on July 12, 1998. It is the night of the French victory of the 1998 World Cup against Brazil: thousands of French are celebrating the victory in Paris at the Eiffel Tower and Vincent is mistaken for a Brazilian and after for a fool, asking why they were celebrating a defeat.

Vincent has also some difficulty mastering that Jacques Chirac is the French president and cybercafés are trendy. His father (Wojciech Pszoniak) sold the family store against a pizzeria and Ronny (Daniel Russo) became their driver. Vincent also has difficulty when he discovers himself married with Sonia (Isabelle Candelier), father and CEO capitalist, greedy and ignoble. His son Cédric (Jimmy Redler) feels a boundless hatred to him and Vincent remains troubled by the beauty of his daughter Marina (Anne Abel). Shocked to have realized that he had become everything he hated in 1982 and having lost all his friends and Laurie, Vincent will try everything to go back in time and change his life, to delete this disastrous future.

== Cast ==
- Patrick Braoudé as Vincent
- Maria de Medeiros as Laurie
- Isabelle Candelier as Sonia
- Daniel Russo as Ronny
- Gad Elmaleh as Lionel
- Élie Semoun as Steve Michaud
- Thierry Lhermitte as Forsan
- Sonia Vollereaux as Carole
- Wojciech Pszoniak as Vincent's father
- Ginette Garcin as Henriette
- Anne Abel as Marina
- Jimmy Redler as Cédric
- Dout as the policeman #1
- Philippe Lelièvre as the policeman #2
- Rémy Roubakha as the Jewish man
- Frédérique Bel as the friend of Vincent's father
- Julie Dray as Sylvie, the secretary
- Malik Zidi as the waiter of the cybercafé
- Guila Braoudé as Sarah
- Christophe Landeau as the man in telephone booth

== See also ==
- Time travel in fiction
- List of French films of 2000
