= The Garden Was Full of Moon =

2000 film

- Directed by: Vitali Melnikov
- Written by: Yuliya Damsker
- Produced by: Sergey Zhigunov; Stanislav Arkhipov; Boris Molochnik; Zulfiya Nurutdinova
- Starring: Zinaida Sharko
- Cinematography: Ivan Bagayev
- Release date: July 2000
- Running time: 115 minutes
- Country: Russia
- Language: Russian

The Garden Was Full of Moon (Russian: Луной был полон сад, romanized: Lunoy byl polon sad) is a 2000 Russian romance film directed by Vitali Melnikov. It was entered into the 22nd Moscow International Film Festival where it won the Special Silver St. George.

== Cast ==
- Zinaida Sharko as Vera Andreyevna
- Kristina Budykho as Vera in youth
- Nikolai Volkov as Aleksei Ivanovich
- Ruslan Fomichyov as Aleksei in youth
- Lev Durov as Grigori Petrovich
- Kseniya Nazarova as Nastya
- Vera Karpova as Literary woman
- Aleksei Vasilyev as Koroyedov
