= Maria Simon (actress) =

German actress (born 1976)

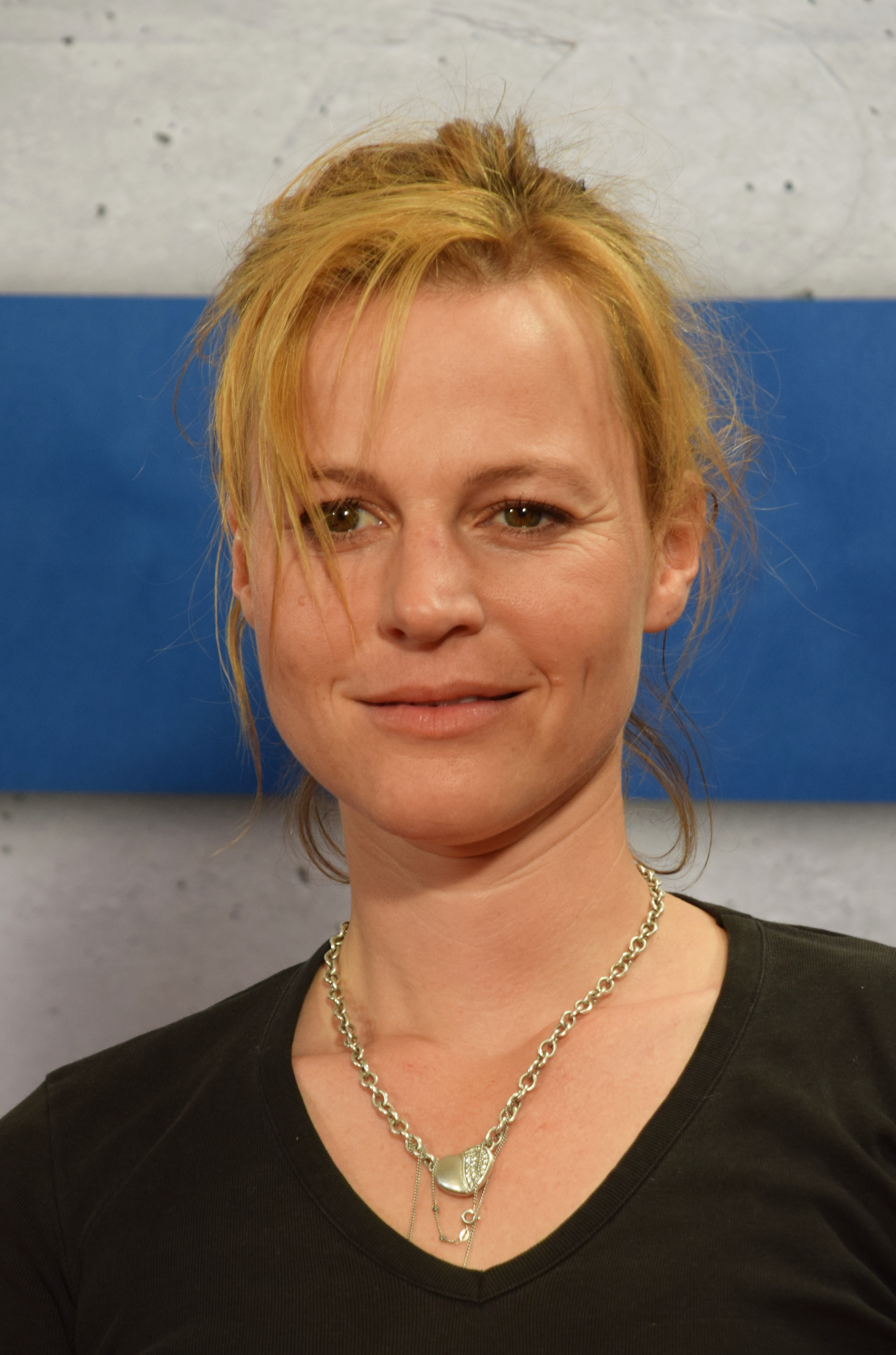
- Simon in 2016
- Born: 6 February 1976 (age 50); Leipzig, East Germany
- Occupation: Actress

Maria Simon (born 6 February 1976) is a German actress.

== Family and background ==
Simon's German father originally hailed from Leipzig and studied mathematics in Leningrad. There he met Simon's Russian-Jewish mother, Olga, who studied electronics and originally hailed from Kazakhstan. The couple married while studying.

Maria Simon is the younger sister of actress Susanna Simon, who was born on 23 July 1968, in Almaty, Kazakhstan. Maria was born and brought up in the former East Germany, but moved to New York City in 1990 to live with her father, a computer expert with the United Nations, and her sister Dalena Simon. She also has a sister named Alyssa.

Simon has four children, the first, actor Ludwig, from a former relationship with the actor Devid Striesow, and three with her ex-husband, the actor Bernd Michael Lade.

== Education ==
After finishing school she moved back to the newly reunited Germany to study acting at the Ernst Busch Academy of Dramatic Arts in Berlin, where she received her diploma in 1999.

== Roles and awards ==
She won the award for Best Actress for her role in the film Zornige Küsse at the 22nd Moscow International Film Festival in 2000. Simon was nominated as the best supporting actress in the 2003 German Film Awards, and was named European Shooting Star (i.e., best newcomer) at the 2004 Berlinale. In the same year she played Polly in Bertolt Brechts Dreigroschenoper at the Maxim Gorki Theater in Berlin. Her TV movie Kleine Schwester was nominated for the Adolf Grimme Awards in 2005.

== Filmography ==
- Angry Kisses (1999), as Lea
- Passing Summer (2001), as Johanna
- Erste Ehe (2002), as Dorit (USA title: Portrait of a Married Couple)
- Against All Evidence (2002), as Stefanie (German title: Meine Tochter ist keine Mörderin)
- Good Bye, Lenin! (2003), as Ariane Kerner
- Distant Lights (2003), as Sonja
- Luther (2003), as Hanna

=== TV work ===
- Jenny Berlin: Tod am Meer (2000, TV series episode), as Tanja Schulz
- Mord im Swingerclub (2000, TV film), as Susanna Bach
- HeliCops – Einsatz über Berlin: Fehlgeleitet (2001, TV series episode), as Biene Virchow
- Balko: Der Schweinemann (2001, TV series episode), as Marischka
- Verbotene Küsse (2001, TV film), as Andrea
- Jonathans Liebe (2001, TV film), as Nina Buchwald
- Tatort: Verrat (2002, TV series episode), as Lisa Mattern
- Alarm für Cobra 11 - Die Autobahnpolizei: Die Clique (2002, TV series episode), as Laura Friedrich
- Tatort: Reise ins Nichts (2002, TV series episode), as Sabine Hallmeier
- Spurlos – Ein Baby verschwindet (2003, TV film), as Andrea Bär
- Fast perfekt verlobt (2003, TV film), as Nika Kreschninski
- K3 – Kripo Hamburg: Auf dünnem Eis (2003, TV series episode), as Kathrin Leutgeb
- Spur & Partner (2003, TV series), as Frau Stolz/Hausmädchen/Eva Hermann
- Carola Stern's Double Life (2004, TV film), as Carola Stern
- Kleine Schwester (2004, TV film), as Katrin Rubakow
- Tatort: Feuertaufe (2005, TV series episode), as Sabine Gerber
- Tatort: Minenspiel (2005, TV series episode), as Hannah Siems
- Die Pathologin (2006, TV film), as Leo
- Not All Were Murderers (2006, TV film), as Lona
- Congo (2010, TV film), as Oberleutnant Nicole Ziegler
- Death at the Baltic Sea (2013, TV film), as Evelyn Kossack
- Gestern waren wir noch Kinder (2023, TV miniseries), as Anna Klettmann
