= Taking Wing =

2000 film

- Directed by: Steve Suissa
- Written by: Marc Esposito; Steve Suissa
- Produced by: Thierry de Navacelle
- Starring: Clément Sibony
- Cinematography: Dominique Chapuis
- Edited by: Monica Coleman
- Music by: White & Spirit; Krishna Levy
- Distributed by: TNVO
- Release date: 5 July 2000
- Running time: 90 minutes
- Country: France
- Language: French

Taking Wing (French: L'Envol) is a 2000 French drama film directed by Steve Suissa. It was entered into the 22nd Moscow International Film Festival where Suissa won the award for Best Director and Clément Sibony won the award for Best Actor.

== Cast ==
- Clément Sibony as Stan
- Isabelle Carré as Julie
- Christine Citti as Stan's mother
- Marc Samuel as Stan's father
- Léopoldine Serre as Lulu
- Steve Suissa as Joseph
- Corinne Dacla as Marthe
- Bernard Fresson as Victor
- Attica Guedj as Sarah
- Denis Bénoliel as Léon
- Isabelle Nanty as Artistic counselor
- Bernard Verley as French teacher
- Francis Huster as Drama teacher
- Laurent Bateau as Man at casting
