= Edward Flannery =

American Catholic priest and author (1912–1998)

Edward H. Flannery
- Born: August 20, 1912; Providence, Rhode Island
- Died: October 19, 1998 (aged 86)
- Ordained: 1937

Edward H. Flannery (August 20, 1912 – October 19, 1998) was an American priest in the Roman Catholic Diocese of Providence, and the author of The Anguish of the Jews: Twenty-Three Centuries of Antisemitism, first published in 1965.

Fr. Flannery was the first director of Catholic-Jewish Relations for the U.S. Bishops' Committee for Ecumenical and Interreligious Affairs, a position he held from 1967 to 1976.

Throughout his career, he fought against antisemitism and defended the State of Israel and the Jewish people against attacks on the local, national, and international levels. Through his work, he displayed great sensitivity to issues of the Holocaust and strong promotion of education of the history of antisemitism for both the Jewish and Catholic communities.

Flannery spoke in hundreds of churches, synagogues, and other settings to promote an understanding of the work of the Second Vatican Council and the National Conference of Catholic Bishops concerning the Church’s bond with the Jewish People. He was also the President of the National Christian Leadership Conference for Israel, and a consultant to Secretariat of Inter-religious Affairs. His other writings include translations of French religious works and essays and articles as well as a variety of publications.

== Biography ==
=== Early life and career ===
Flannery was born in Providence, Rhode Island, to John Flannery, a police officer, and Elizabeth (née Mulvey).

He studied at St. Charles College in Catonsville, and went on to earn a bachelor's degree at St. Sulpice Seminary near Paris. He then earned his master's degree at Catholic University in Washington, D.C.

In 1937, he was ordained; he spent most of the next 30 years in the Diocese of Providence working as a pastor and chaplain as well as writing for the diocesan newspaper.

In 1967, Flannery began nine years as the first director of Catholic-Jewish Relations at the National Conference of Catholic Bishops. He became Associate Director of the Institute of Judeo-Christian Studies at Seton Hall University and Director of the Continuing Education of the Clergy for the Diocese of Providence, Rhode Island.

In 1976, he returned to Providence and was concerned with the continuing education of the diocesan clergy and with Catholic-Jewish relations.

On October 19, 1998, Flannery died of pancreatic cancer.

=== Work and views ===
Flannery devoted his life to the reconciliation of Christians and Jews and the study of antisemitism.

In his book, The Anguish of the Jews: Twenty-Three Centuries of Antisemitism, he provided a thorough account of the history of the world's persecution of the Jews, without dwelling on the lurid details of the atrocities. He covers Pagan antisemitism in the ancient world; the struggles between Judaism and the early church; Christian antisemitism in the Middle Ages in the various countries of Europe; the age of the ghetto; the rise of scapegoat antisemitism in the modern, post-religious world (particularly in Russia) associated with Nazi paganism and the Holocaust; as well as antisemitism in America. In the end, Flannery reviews how things stand today (i.e., at the book's publication).

In relation to the Holocaust, Flannery illustrated the sympathies for the Nazi regime and Final Solution expressed by prominent Arab figures at the time, such as the close confidant of Adolf Hitler, Haj Amin al-Husseini. Flannery traced antisemitism back to the 3rd century BC and identified the following strains: political and economic antisemitism, theological or religious antisemitism (also known as anti-Judaism), nationalistic antisemitism, and racial antisemitism (e.g., the foundations of Nazism).

In an interview in 1967, Flannery said: "The anti-Semite, not the Jew, is the real Christ-killer. He thinks he's religious, but that's a self-delusion. Actually he finds religion so heavy a burden, he develops 'Christophobia.' He's hostile to the faith and has an unconscious hatred of Christ, who is for him, Christ the Repressor. He uses anti-Semitism as a safety valve for this hostility and is really trying to strike out at Christ."

Flannery was awarded honorary doctorates from several institutions, including Hebrew Union College-Jewish Institute of Religion, Cincinnati, and Seton Hall University. He received the prestigious Nicholas and Hedy Munk International Brotherhood Award of the Canadian Council of Christians and Jews and many other signs of esteem from Christian and Jewish Organizations.

Flannery believed the vast majority of even well-educated Christians have been ignorant of what has happened to the Jews throughout history and the culpable involvement of the Church. Apart from a few recent publications, there is little about antisemitism in Christian history books or social studies. The author states that, by comparison, the Jews themselves are largely and acutely aware of their painful history and physical and verbal attacks in the press.

Flannery was one of the 53 authors to respond to Simon Wiesenthal's book The Sunflower.

== Legacy ==
After his death, tributes to his achievements came from Rabbi A. James Rudin, Father John Hotchkin, Director of the NCCB Secretariat for Ecumenical and Interreligious Affairs, and Eugene J. Fisher, who succeeded him as Director for Catholic-Jewish Relations for the Bishops' Conference.

Speaking at a 1987 Mass of Thanksgiving in honor of the 50th year of Flannery's ordained ministry, Msgr. George G. Higgins of the Department of Theology of the Catholic University of America said Flannery had been called by God to break new ground; "to address the anguish of the Jews and this, of course, long before the overwhelming majority of his fellow Christians had given so much as a second thought to the Holocaust."

At the 1997 celebration of Flannery's 60th ordination anniversary, the National Director of the Anti-Defamation League, Abraham Foxman, said: "His [Flannery's] magnificent spirit, his emphatic heart, his great mind walk with prophets and kings and all those who ennoble the world with their courage and character."

ADL Director of Interfaith Affairs, Rabbi Leon Klenicki, said: "I know Edward’s limitless energy for dialogue and friendship. He is a person of God, sharing his spirituality with all of us. God bless him." Cardinal William Henry Keeler said: "He was an early and effective pioneer in encouraging Catholics in the United States on how best to implement Nostra Aetate, the Second Vatican Council's charter for fostering positive Catholic-Jewish relationships."

Rabbi A. James Rudin, National Interreligious Affairs Director of the American Jewish Committee (who termed Flannery "one of this century's spiritual giants"), said "during Father Flannery's long and distinguished career, he helped build human bridges of mutual respect and understanding between Roman Catholics and Jews. His advice and guidance were always treasured and his articulate voice and writings stirred both Catholics and Jews. The AJC has lost a beloved colleague and friend. He shattered negative caricatures and stereotypes that had existed for centuries. Father Flannery was an unrelenting foe of all forms of anti-Semitism and was a strong supporter of the State of Israel."
