= Amour et confusions =

- Theatrical release poster
- Directed by: Patrick Braoudé
- Written by: Patrick Braoudé
- Produced by: Alain Goldman
- Starring: Patrick Braoudé; Kristin Scott Thomas; Gérard Darmon; Valeria Bruni Tedeschi
- Production company: Gaumont
- Distributed by: Gaumont Buena Vista International
- Release date: 5 February 1997 (France)
- Running time: 105 minutes
- Language: French
- Box office: $1.5 million (France)

Amour et confusions is a French film which was released in 1997. It was directed and written by Patrick Braoudé. Starring Patrick Braoudé, Kristin Scott, Thomas Valeria, Bruni Tedeschi, Gérard Darmon.

== Cast ==
- Patrick Braoudé: Dan
- Kristin Scott Thomas: Sarah
- Valeria Bruni Tedeschi: Michelle
- Gérard Darmon: Simon
- Jeanne Moreau: Libra
- Michèle Garcia: Madame Villiers
- Ticky Holgado: The sexologist
- Judith El Zein: The hostess
- Steve Suissa: Guard

== Reception ==
The film opened in sixth place at the French box office with a gross of 3.9 million Franc from 203 screens. After 3 weeks it had grossed 8 million Franc ($1.5 million).
