= Harry J. Cargas =

American Holocaust scholar

- Born: Harry James Cargas; June 18, 1932; Detroit, Michigan, U.S.
- Died: August 18, 1998 (aged 66); St. Louis, Missouri, U.S.
- Occupations: Professor, scholar, author
- Spouse: Millie Cargas
- Children: 6

Academic background
- Education: University of Michigan; Saint Louis University

Harry James Cargas (June 18, 1932 – August 18, 1998) was an American scholar and author best known for his writing and research on the Holocaust, Jewish–Catholic relations, and American literature. He was a professor at Webster University for nearly three decades, and his circle of friends and collaborators included the American novelist Kurt Vonnegut, Nobel Laureate and Holocaust survivor Elie Wiesel and sportscaster and humanitarian Bob Costas.

== Life and education ==
Cargas was the son of James and Sophie Cargas of Hamtramck, Michigan. His father was a Greek immigrant and his mother was of Polish descent, and they raised their son in a working-class area near Detroit. As a young man, Cargas struggled to find a career. He quit university education four times before finishing his first degree, and he spent several years working odd jobs in factories, bars, restaurants, and trucking in both Michigan and Indiana. He also spent time in the copper mines of Montana and as an athletic director for a boys' school in New York and wrestling coach in New Jersey before finding his calling as a scholar.

Cargas served in the Korean War and was a decorated combat veteran. After the war, however, he became a lifelong pacifist. His philosophy of nonviolence was influenced by the writings of Catholic mystic Thomas Merton, and Cargas published the introduction to the Japanese edition of Merton's autobiography The Seven Storey Mountain in The Queen's Work magazine while he was its editor.

Cargas committed himself fully to academic life in 1963. He earned a BA and MA from the University of Michigan, and received a PhD in literature from Saint Louis University. In 1970, he joined the faculty of Webster University, where he taught until his death in 1998. He was the chair of the English department there and also taught courses in the history, art, and religion departments. Some of his course topics included the novels of Kurt Vonnegut, protest literature, Latin American literature, prison literature, and Native American literature. A lifelong proponent of good sportsmanship, Cargas also served as the athletic director for the university between 1988–1989.

Cargas was a prolific writer and authored more than 2,500 articles and 32 books. He was also a frequent public speaker who lectured worldwide, as well as appearing as a regular commentator on St. Louis Public Radio for 25 years. His recognitions and awards included the Human Rights Award from the United Nations Association, the Eternal Flame Award from the Anne Frank Institute, and the Tree of Life from the Jewish National Fund.

== Holocaust studies and Catholic–Jewish relations ==
Cargas was first introduced to the subject of the Holocaust when he read an excerpt from Elie Wiesel's biographical work Night in a magazine one evening. For the rest of his life after that initial intellectual encounter, much of his scholarly work revolved around the Holocaust and the relations between Jews and Catholics. His mission was to bring "historic truth to his Church" and to provoke Catholic leadership to acknowledge both its role in allowing the Holocaust to happen, as well as its inaction and silence during the war. In particular, he was horrified by the idea that almost "every Jew killed in the Holocaust was murdered by a baptized Christian."

In 1979, he developed a list of 16 proposals that would lay the foundation of proper relations between Jews and Christians. These proposals included excommunicating Adolf Hitler, adding Jewish memorials to the Christian liturgical calendar, reexamining Christian theology and history in light of the Holocaust, moving Christian Sabbath to Saturday, and repenting for Christian sins against the Jewish people.

Cargas labeled himself a "post-Auschwitz Catholic" and cultivated a deep friendship and intellectual partnership with the writer and Holocaust survivor Elie Wiesel. The two collaborated on several works, including Conversations with Elie Wiesel, Telling the Tale, Voices from the Holocaust, and A Christian Response to the Holocaust.

In 1980, President Jimmy Carter appointed Cargas as one of the original members of the U.S. Holocaust Memorial Council, which laid the groundwork for the Holocaust Memorial Museum in Washington, D.C. He was also an executive councilman for the U.S. Holocaust Council and the only Catholic ever appointed to the Advisory Committee for Yad Vashem, Israel's official memorial to Jewish victims of the Holocaust.

Shortly before his death in 1998, Cargas showed his continued dissatisfaction with the Catholic Church's response to its role in the Holocaust by rejecting Vatican statements on Jewish–Catholic reconciliation as simply camouflage.

In an essay in honor of Cargas after his death, Kurt Vonnegut wrote that Cargas, whom he referred to as "my buddy, Father Cargas," was "a person of historical importance for having taken into his very bones, as a Christian, the horrifying mystery of how persons could profess love of Jesus Christ, as did most Nazis, ... yet commit a crime as merciless as the extermination of Europe's Jews. Every word he writes or speaks is somehow atonement."

== Death ==
Harry James Cargas died of a brain hemorrhage while being treated at Barnes-Jewish Hospital in St. Louis. He is buried in Saint Peter Cemetery in Kirkwood, Missouri.

== Selected writings ==
- A Christian Response to the Holocaust (1981)
- When God and Man Failed (1981)
- Reflections of a Post-Auschwitz Christian (1989)
- Conversations with Elie Wiesel (1992)
- Voices from the Holocaust (1993)
- Telling the Tale: A Tribute to Elie Wiesel (1993)
- The Unnecessary Problem of Edith Stein (1997)
- Holocaust Scholars Write to the Vatican (1998)
