= 22nd Moscow International Film Festival =

Film festival

- Location: Moscow, Russia
- Founded: 1959
- Awards: Grand Prix
- Festival date: 19–29 July 2000
- Website: Website

The 22nd Moscow International Film Festival was held from 19 to 29 July 2000. The Golden St. George was awarded to the Polish-French film Life as a Fatal Sexually Transmitted Disease directed by Krzysztof Zanussi.

== Jury ==
- Theodoros Angelopoulos (Greece – President of the Jury)
- Caroline Ducey (France)
- Irvin Kershner (United States)
- Samira Makhmalbaf (Iran)
- Jiro Shindo (Japan)
- Sergei Solovyov (Russia)
- Bakhtyar Khudojnazarov (Tajikistan)
- Zhang Yuan (China)

== Films in competition ==
The following films were selected for the main competition:

English title	Original title	Director(s)	Production country
Beat	Beat	Gary Walkow	United States
The Widow of Saint-Pierre	La veuve de Saint-Pierre	Patrice Leconte	France, Canada
Taking Wing	L'Envol	Steve Suissa	France
Villa-Lobos: A Life of Passion	Villa-Lobos - Uma Vida de Paixão	Zelito Viana	Brazil
Same Love, Same Rain	El mismo amor, la misma lluvia	Juan Jose Campanella	Argentina, United States
Women Kingdom	Ayollar saltanaty	Yusup Razykov	Uzbekistan
Life as a Fatal Sexually Transmitted Disease	Zycie jako smiertelna choroba przenoszona droga plciowa	Krzysztof Zanussi	Poland, France
Once Upon Another Time	Erase otra vez	Juan Pinzás	Spain
The Conception of My Younger Brother	Početí mého mladšího bratra	Vladimír Drha	Czech Republic
The Famous Paparazzo	Faimosul paparazzo	Nicolae Mărgineanu	Romania
Leo	Leo	José Luis Borau	Spain
Lunar Eclipse	Yue shi	Wang Quan'an	China
The Garden Was Full of Moon	Lunoy byl polon sad	Vitali Melnikov	Russia
Restless	Levottomat	Aku Louhimies	Finland
Our Love	A Mi szerelmünk	József Pacskovszky	Hungary
The Spreading Ground	The Spreading Ground	Derek Vanlint	Canada
Shadows of Memories	Senke uspomena	Predrag Velinovic	Yugoslavia
Angry Kisses	Zornige Küsse	Judith Kennel	Switzerland

== Awards ==
- Golden St. George: Life as a Fatal Sexually Transmitted Disease by Krzysztof Zanussi
- Special Silver St. George: The Garden Was Full of Moon by Vitali Melnikov
- Silver St. George:
  - Best Director: Steve Suissa for Taking Wing
  - Best Actor: Clément Sibony for Taking Wing
  - Best Actress: Maria Simon for Angry Kisses
- Prix FIPRESCI: Lunar Eclipse by Wang Quan'an
- Special Mention: Taking Wing by Steve Suissa
- Honorable Prize: For the contribution to cinema: Gleb Panfilov
