= Religio licita =

Permitted religion in ancient Roman law

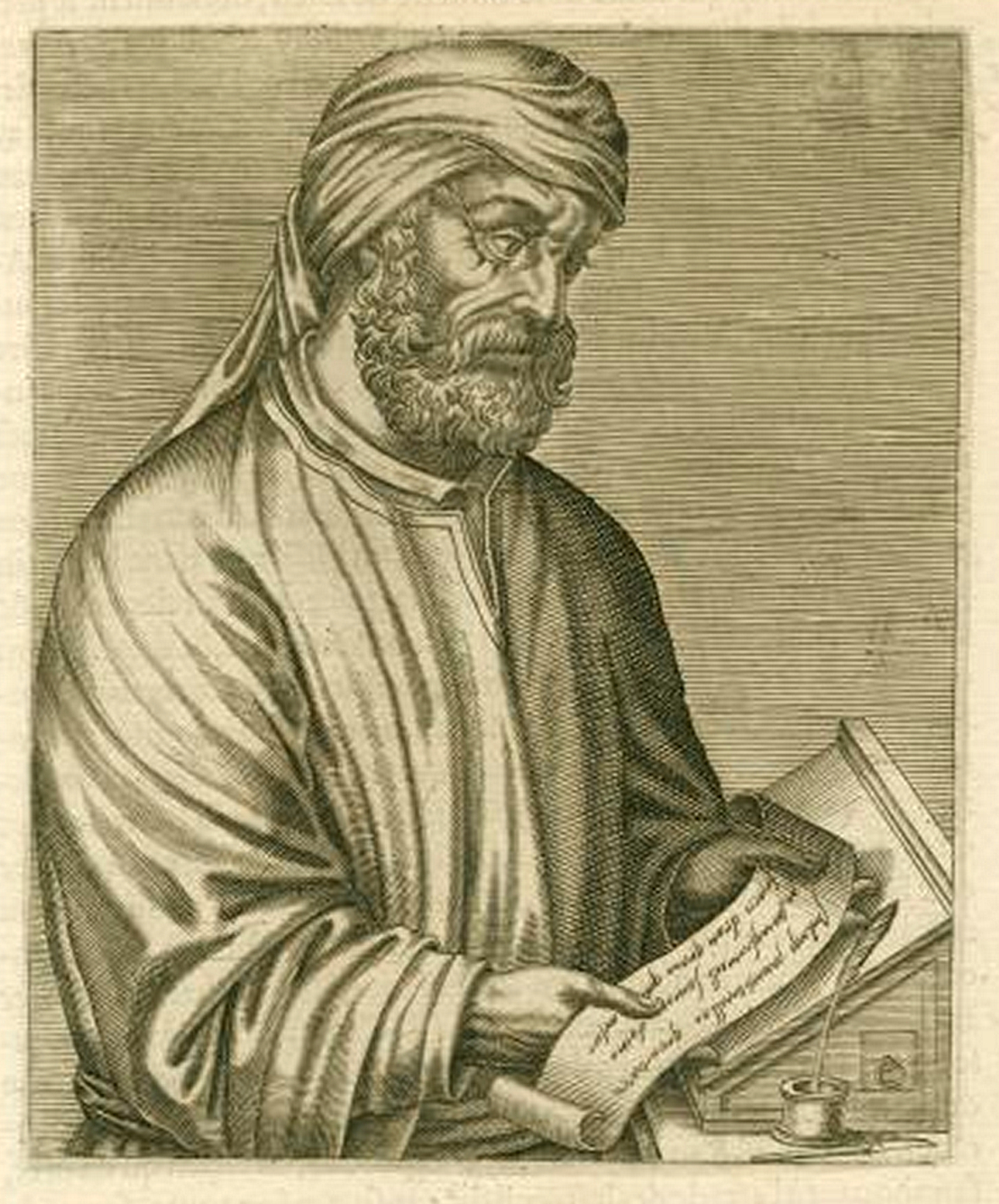
Quintus Florens Tertullianus (Tertullian)

Religio licita ("permitted religion", also translated as "approved religion") is a phrase used in the Apologeticum of Tertullian to describe the legal toleration of Christians. It was not an official term in Roman law.

Although it occurs in only one patristic text and in no classical Roman sources or inscriptions, the phrase has spawned abundant scholarly conjecture on its possible significance. Some scholars have gone so far as to imagine that all religions under the Empire had a legal status as either licita or illicita, despite the absence of any ancient texts referring to these categories. The most extreme view has held that Tertullian's phrase means all foreign religions required a license from the Roman government. However, it was Roman custom to permit or even to encourage the subject peoples of the Roman province and foreign communities in Rome to maintain their ancestral religion unless specific practices were regarded as disruptive or subversive: "A religio was licita for a particular group on the basis of tribe or nationality and traditional practices, coupled with the proviso that its rites were not offensive to the Roman people or its gods."

Tertullian uses the phrase in a passage arguing that Christians should be granted the same freedom to practice their religion as any other of the empire's inhabitants; the passage itself, not the phrase religio licita, is evidence of the general tolerance afforded under the Roman system of religion.

== Judaism as licita ==
Religio licita has sometimes been taken as a formal recognition or charter originating with Julius Caesar and embodied by various pieces of Roman legislation pertaining to the Jews, conceived of as a coherent policy. In fact, the various privileges and exemptions granted to the Jews were responses to specific complaints or requests, made in the context of the traditional patronage network, and had nothing to do with a supposed religio licita status. To the extent that the Romans respected Judaism, it was because of the religion's great antiquity, ancestral tradition being regarded as a source of social and political stability.

It has been observed that "Roman magistrates treated the Jews the way they did not because they were consciously tolerant, but simply because they had no reason to hinder the free exercise of Jewish religious practices."

== Christianity as illicita ==
Although this term appears nowhere, it has been conjectured that a declaration of Christianity as illicita was the legal basis for official persecutions. There was, however, "no law, either existing section of criminal law, or special legislation directed against the Christians, under which Christians were prosecuted in the first two centuries." Rome lacked a uniform policy or legal code pertaining to foreign cults, and before Christian hegemony in the 4th century, there was no legal language to designate a concept analogous to "heresy" or crimes against orthodox religion. Some scholars have argued that Christianity was declared a religio illicita (an impermissible or illegitimate religion) by Nero following the Great Fire of Rome in 64.

Under Constantine the Great, Christianity and other religions became tolerated with the Edict of Milan in 313. Toleration did not extend to religions that practiced human sacrifice, such as Druidism. This state of affairs lasted until 380, when Nicene Christianity was adopted as the state religion of the Roman Empire, after which time persecution of non-Christian and non-Nicene cults began. Priscillian was executed for heresy in 385, and Theodosius I began outlawing Rome's traditional religious rituals in 391.

== See also ==
- History of the Jews in the Roman Empire
- Persecution of the early Christians
- Religious toleration
