= Sicut Judaeis =

Medieval papal letter of protection for the Jews

Sicut Judaeis ('As the Jews') were papal bulls which set out the official position of the papacy regarding the treatment of Jews. The first bull by that name was issued in about 1120 by Callixtus II and served as a papal charter of protection to Jews. Based on the teachings of pope Gregory on the Jews, it was prompted by attacks on Jews by the First Crusade, during which over five thousand Jews were killed in Europe. The bull forbade Christians, on pain of excommunication, from forcing Jews to convert, harming them, taking their property, disturbing the celebration of their festivals and interfering with their cemeteries.

Following further attacks, further bulls by many popes reaffirmed the doctrine, including Alexander III, Celestine III (1191–1198), Innocent III (1199), Honorius III (1216), Gregory IX (1235), Innocent IV (1246, 1247), Alexander IV (1255), Urban IV (1262), Gregory X (1272, 1274), Nicholas III, Martin IV (1281), Honorius IV (1285–1287), Nicholas IV (1288–1292), Clement VI (1348), Urban V (1365), Boniface IX (1389), Martin V (1422), and Nicholas V (1447).

== Church attitude to treatment of Jews ==
=== Antiquity ===
The Church's stated attitude against the mistreatment of Jews goes back to the early Church. Around 400, St Augustine, one of the most influential and foundational figures of Catholic theology, preached that the Jews must be protected for their ability to explain the Old Testament. In his works De civitate Dei, Contra Iuadeos, and Contra Faustum, Augustine argued that Jews were living, though unwitting, witnesses to Jesus. Additionally, the popes adopted the position of the Roman law as formulated in the Theodosian and Justinian code.

The words sicut Judaeis ('As the Jews') were first used by Pope Gregory I (590–604) in a letter addressed to the Bishop of Naples. Around 598, in reaction to anti-Jewish attacks by Christians in Palermo, Pope Gregory brought Augustine's teachings into Roman law. He published a bull which became the foundation of Catholic doctrine in relation to the Jews and specified that, although the Jews had not accepted salvation through Christ, and were therefore condemned by God until such time as they accept salvation, Christians were nevertheless duty-bound to protect the Jews as an important part of Christian civilization. The Pope emphasized that Jews were entitled to "enjoy their lawful liberty." Just as Jews were forbidden from pursuing more freedoms than granted by the Roman laws, so Christians should be forbidden from infringing the rights that Jews had. The Bull said that Jews should be treated equitably and justly, that their property rights should be protected, and that they should keep their own festivals and religious practices. This letter became later also known as Constitutio pro Iudaeis.

Gregory I held further that Jews should not be forced to accept baptism and that only conversion by persuasion, own free will and religious conviction was to be baptized. One of Gregory's letters in which he formulated these thoughts was considered by later canonists so important that it was included in Gratian's Concordia discordantium canonum from 1140 and which became a standard work for all canon lawyers who commented on twelfth and thirteenth century papal decretals.

=== Middle Ages ===
The goal of papal policy between the 11th and 13th centuries was, while also demonstrating their theologically assigned and restricted place in society according to the Theodosian Code and dependent on the pope, to protect Jews physically, alongside their property. In 1065, Pope Alexander II wrote to Béranger, Viscount of Narbonne, and to Guifred, bishop of the city, praising them for having prevented the massacre of the Jews in their district, and reminding them that God does not approve of the shedding of blood. In 1065 also, Alexander admonished Landulf VI of Benevento "that the conversion of Jews is not to be obtained by force." The attitude that baptism should never be forced became one of the core tenets of the re-issues of the Sicut Iuadeis in the eleventh and twelfth century, following Gregory's ideas.

To avoid persecutions and massacres, Popes begun to re-issue the Constitutio pro Iudaeis in the Middle Ages and reference Gregory I. One of the first was Callixtus II, who clearly referenced Gregory in by starting his letter like Gregory with the words Sicut Iudaeis, though the letter does not survive. While a similar letter by Eugenius III has also not survived, another re-issue by Alexander III provides the first extant version of the Constitutio pro Iudaeis and states that Jews were under papal protection. The bull was re-issued by Clement III and Celestine III and often linked with papal calls for crusades and in response to appeals by Jewish communities.

The Sicut Judaeis template experienced a significant change under Pope Innocent III, who was concerned with both external enemies of Christianity such as the Muslim kingdoms as well as internal enemies such as heretics. Though he also issued the letter like his predecessors, he added a phrase according to which only those Jews, that did not plot against Christianity, would be protected. He also saw it as his role to monitor Jewish communities and ensure they fulfil the witness role as described by Augustine. This also manifested in the regulations in the Fourth Lateran Council in 1215, which for instance decreed that Jews be differentiated from others by their type of clothing. This rule, which mirrored already existing Muslim legislation towards Christians and Jews, was to avoid marriage between Jews and Christians and to distinguish the Jews so that it could be guaranteed that they would not be harmed, though it likely encouraged all kinds of discrimination.

By the thirteenth century, for various reasons Augustine's teaching had eroded and Jewish presence was less tolerated. The impositions of exorbitant taxes on Jews, and the practice of expelling Jews, usually after stripping them of their property through taxation, was widespread. For example, in 1229, King Henry III of England forced Jews to pay half the value of their property in taxes, which was followed by further taxation and then by the expulsion of Jews from England in 1290. Jews were also expelled from France, Spain, and Portugal.

== Extracts from the bull ==
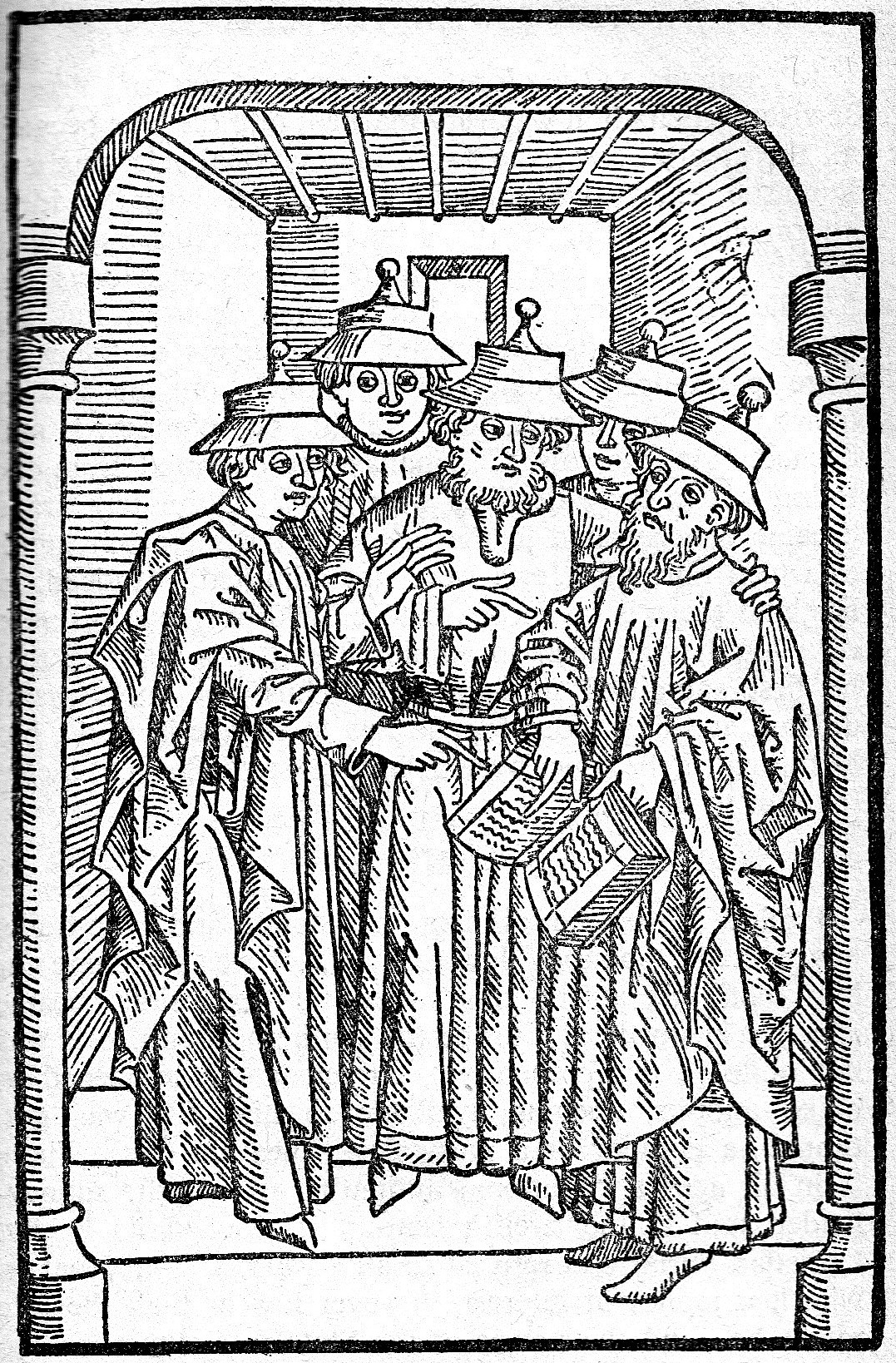
Jews studying in a synagogue, c.1483

Pope Alexander III (1159–1181) is the author of the oldest extant version of the bull. Excerpts from a translation of the bull follow:

"[The Jews] ought to suffer no prejudice. We, out of the meekness of Christian piety, and in keeping in the footprints of Our predecessors of happy memory, the Roman Pontiffs Calixtus, Eugene, Alexander, Clement, admit their petition, and We grant them the buckler of Our protection.

For We make the law that no Christian compel them, unwilling or refusing, by violence to come to baptism. But, if any one of them should spontaneously, and for the sake of the faith, fly to the Christians, once his choice has become evident, let him be made a Christian without any calumny. Indeed, he is not considered to possess the true faith of Christianity who is not recognized to have come to Christian baptism, not spontaneously, but unwillingly.

Too, no Christian ought to presume...to injure their persons, or with violence to take their property, or to change the good customs which they have had until now in whatever region they inhabit.

Besides, in the celebration of their own festivities, no one ought disturb them in any way, with clubs or stones, nor ought any one try to require from them or to extort from them services they do not owe, except for those they have been accustomed from times past to perform.

...We decree... that no one ought to dare mutilate or diminish a Jewish cemetery, nor, in order to get money, to exhume bodies once they have been buried.

If anyone, however, shall attempt, the tenor of this decree once known, to go against it...let him be punished by the vengeance of excommunication, unless he correct his presumption by making equivalent satisfaction."

== Bibliography ==
- Rist, Rebecca (2016). Popes and Jews, 1095-1291. Oxford University Press. ISBN 978-0-19-871798-0.
- Simonsohn, Shlomo (1988). The Apostolic See and the Jews: Documents: 492-1404 (in Latin). Leiden: Verlag E. J. Brill. ISBN 0-88844-094-4.
