= Patrick Braoudé =

French actor, director, screenwriter and producer

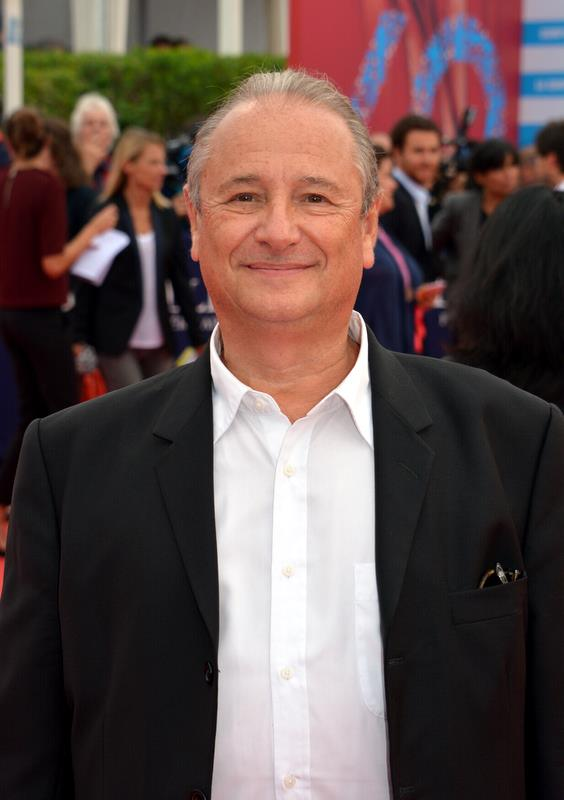
- Braoudé at the 2014 Deauville American Film Festival
- Born: 25 September 1954 (age 72); Paris, France
- Occupations: Actor, director, screenwriter, and producer
- Years active: 1982–present

Patrick Braoudé (French: [patʁik bʁaude]; born 25 September 1954) is a French actor, director, screenwriter, and producer.

== Selected filmography ==
=== Producer ===
- 1990: Génial, mes parents divorcent
- 1993: Neuf mois
- 1996: Amour et confusions
- 2000: Deuxième vie
- 2004: Iznogoud

=== Actor ===
- 1983: Ballade sanglante (short-film)
- 1984: Femmes de personnes
- 1985: Train d'enfer
- 1986: Je hais les acteurs
- 1990: L'Œil au beur(re) noir
- 1987 : L'été en pente douce
- 1990 : Génial, mes parents divorcent
- 1993 : Neuf mois
- 1994: Grossesse nerveuse
- 1995: Dis-moi oui
- 1996: XY
- 1996: Amour et confusions
- 1997: Que la lumière soit
- 1999: Quasimodo d'El Paris
- 1999 : Je veux tout
- 2000 : Deuxième vie
- 2001: And now... Ladies and Gentlemen
- 2003: La Carpe dans la baignoire
- 2003: Les Clefs de bagnole
- 2003: Tout pout l'oseille
- 2006: Girlfriends
- 2014: The Missionaries
- 2016: Joséphine s'arrondit

=== Screenwriter ===
- 1986: Black Mic Mac
- 1987: L'Œil au beur(re) noir
- 1987: Un père et passe
- 1990: Génial, mes parents divorcent
- 1991: Mohamed Bertrand-Duval
- 1993: Neuf mois
- 1995: Nine Months
- 1996: Amour et confusions
- 2000: Deuxième vie
- 2004: Iznogoud

== See also ==
- 1990 in film
