= Pope John Paul II and Judaism =

Christian-Jewish relations under the 264th pope

Pope John Paul II worked to improve relations between the Roman Catholic Church and Judaism. He built solid ties with the Jewish community in the hope of promoting Christian–Jewish reconciliation.

In an interview with the Polish Press Agency, Michael Schudrich, chief rabbi of Poland, said that never in history did anyone do as much for Christian-Jewish dialogue as John Paul II, adding that many Jews had a greater respect for the late pope than for some rabbis. Schudrich praised John Paul II for condemning anti-Semitism as a sin, which no previous pope had done.

On John Paul II's beatification, the Chief Rabbi of Rome Riccardo Di Segni said in an interview with the Vatican newspaper L'Osservatore Romano that "John Paul II was revolutionary because he tore down a thousand-year wall of Catholic distrust of the Jewish world." Meanwhile, Elio Toaff, the former Chief Rabbi of Rome, said that:

"Remembrance of the Pope Karol Wojtyła will remain strong in the collective Jewish memory because of his appeals to fraternity and the spirit of tolerance, which excludes all violence. In the stormy history of relations between Roman popes and Jews in the ghetto in which they were closed for over three centuries in humiliating circumstances, John Paul II is a bright figure in his uniqueness. In relations between our two great religions in the new century that was stained with bloody wars and the plague of racism, the heritage of John Paul II remains one of the few spiritual islands guaranteeing survival and human progress."

== Youth experience ==
As a child, Karol Wojtyła had played sports with his many Jewish neighbours. He was one of the few popes to have grown up in a climate of flourishing Jewish culture, one of the key components of pre-war Kraków, his interest in Jewish life dated from early youth. He wrote and delivered a number of speeches on the subject of the Church's relationship with Jews, and often paid homage to the victims of the Holocaust in many nations.

In 1998 he issued "We Remember: A Reflection on the Shoah" which outlined his thinking on the Holocaust.

== Visit to synagogue ==
He also became the first pope known to have made an official papal visit to a synagogue, when he visited the Great Synagogue of Rome on 13 April 1986.

The Pope has said that Jews are "our elder brothers." (see dual-covenant theology)

== Auschwitz ==
In 1979 he became the first pope to visit the former German Auschwitz concentration camp in occupied Poland. On 13 April 1986 Pope John Paul II visited The Great Synagogue of Rome. The visit became the first known visit to a synagogue by a pope. He also visited the Holocaust memorial Yad Vashem in Israel in March 2000, and touched the holiest outward remaining shrine of the Jewish people, the Western Wall in Jerusalem. He placed in the Western Wall a prayer that read:

God of our fathers, you chose Abraham and his descendants to bring your name to the nations. We are deeply saddened by the behavior of those who, in the course of history, have caused these children of yours to suffer.

== Speech in Mainz ==
On November 17, 1980, John Paul II delivered a speech in Mainz to Jewish communities in Germany in which he discussed his views of Catholic-Jewish relations. During the speech, John Paul II cited the Guidelines for the Implementation of the [Second Vatican] Council Declaration Nostra Aetate, claiming that Catholics "will endeavor to understand better all that in the Old Testament preserves a proper and perpetual value ..., since this value has not been obliterated by the further interpretation of the New Testament, which on the contrary gave the Older its most complete meaning, so that the New one receives from the Old light and explanation ."

== Relations with Israel ==
In 1994, John Paul II established formal diplomatic relations between the Holy See and the State of Israel, acknowledging its centrality in Jewish life and faith. In honour of this event, Pope John Paul II hosted The Papal Concert to Commemorate the Holocaust. This concert, which was conceived and conducted by American Maestro Gilbert Levine, was attended by the Chief Rabbi of Rome, the President of Italy, and survivors of the Holocaust from around the world.

The Pope played a role in the 1990s peace negotiations in the hopes of finding a diplomatic solution between Israelis and Palestinians. However, the 1993 fundamental accord was not put into application during his papacy because of lingering problems over tax issues.

== Papal concert ==
On 7 April 1994, he hosted the Papal Concert to Commemorate the Holocaust. It was the first-ever Vatican event dedicated to the memory of the six million Jews murdered in World War II. This concert, which was conceived and conducted by US conductor Gilbert Levine, was attended by the Chief Rabbi of Rome Elio Toaff, the President of Italy Oscar Luigi Scalfaro, and survivors of the Holocaust from around the world. The Royal Philharmonic Orchestra, actor Richard Dreyfuss and cellist Lynn Harrell performed on this occasion under Levine's direction. On the morning of the concert, the pope received the attending members of survivor community in a special audience in the Apostolic Palace.

== The issue of the Carmelite Nun convent at Auschwitz ==
Efforts at reconciliation took a step back when the Polish national Catholic bishops conferences supported the Carmelite Nuns in their attempt to establish a convent at the former World War II Nazi-run death camp located at Auschwitz, a very sensitive site in the memorial to the victims of the Holocaust. The proposed location of this convent provoked hostility from some sectors of the Jewish community to the idea of building the Catholic institution on the ground where mass genocide of Jews was carried out. Jewish groups believed that this was inappropriate, and some groups engaged in peaceful protest. The nuns at the convent accused Modern Orthodox Rabbi Avi Weiss, of Riverdale, Bronx, NY, of attempting to assault them.

The Vatican did not support this convent, but noted that since Vatican II each national bishop's conference had local autonomy. Rabbi León Klenicki, founding member of the Interfaith Theological Forum of the John Paul II Center in Washington, D.C., said:

Since Vatican II, each national bishops’ conference has its freedom to deal with local issues. Once the nuns took that place, that was under the jurisdiction of the Polish national bishops’ conference, not the Vatican. The pope couldn’t say anything. The pope intervened when the bishops’ conference was not strong enough to stop the convent. When he realized that nothing was being done, he issued an order for the nuns to move. (Lipman, 2005)

== Pius IX and Pius XII ==
Some Jews were also upset at the beatification of Pius IX in 2000 because of memories of the Mortara case. Relations also soured after the emerging problems over Pius XII at Yad Vashem.

== Visit to Israel ==
In March 2000, John Paul II visited Yad Vashem, (the Israeli national Holocaust memorial) in Israel and later made history by touching a very holy site in Judaism, the Western Wall in Jerusalem, placing a letter inside it (in which he prayed for forgiveness for the actions against Jews in the past). In part of his address he said: “I assure the Jewish people the Catholic Church ... is deeply saddened by the hatred, acts of persecution and displays of anti-Semitism directed against the Jews by Christians at any time and in any place”, he added that there were “no words strong enough to deplore the terrible tragedy of the Holocaust”. Israeli cabinet minister Rabbi Michael Melchior, who hosted the Pope's visit, said he was “very moved” by the Pope's gesture.

“It was beyond history, beyond memory”

— Rabbi Michael Melchior (26 March 2000)

"We are deeply saddened by the behaviour of those who in the course of history have caused these children of yours to suffer, and asking your forgiveness we wish to commit ourselves to genuine brotherhood with the people of the Covenant."

— Pope John Paul II (12 March 2000) from a note left by the Pope at the Western Wall in Jerusalem

== Intercommunity praise ==
In October 2003, the Anti-Defamation League (ADL) issued a statement congratulating Pope John Paul II on entering the 25th year of his papacy:

His deep commitment to reconciliation between the Catholic Church and the Jewish people has been fundamental to his papacy. Jews throughout the world are deeply grateful to the Pope. He has defended the Jewish people at all times, as a priest in his native Poland and during his pontificate... We pray that he remains healthy for many years to come, that he achieves much success in his holy work and that Catholic-Jewish relations continue to flourish.

Immediately after the pope's death, the ADL issued a statement that Pope John Paul II had revolutionised Catholic-Jewish relations, saying that “more change for the better took place in his 27 year Papacy than in the nearly 2,000 years before.” In another statement issued by the Australia, Israel & Jewish Affairs Council, Director Dr. Colin Rubenstein said,“The Pope will be remembered for his inspiring spiritual leadership in the cause of freedom and humanity. He achieved far more in terms of transforming relations with both the Jewish people and the State of Israel than any other figure in the history of the Catholic Church”

“With Judaism, therefore, we have a relationship which we do not have with any other religion. You are our dearly beloved brothers, and in a certain way, it could be said that you are our elder brothers.”

— Pope John Paul II (13 April 1986)

== See also ==
- Index of Vatican City-related articles
- Pontifical Commission for Religious Relations with the Jews
