= Papal Concert of Reconciliation =

The Papal Concert of Reconciliation was a historic musical event in the pontificate of Pope John Paul II. The concert took place in the Paul VI Auditorium at the Vatican on January 17, 2004, in the presence of the Pontiff, Rav Elio Toaff, the Emeritus Chief Rabbi of Rome, and Abdulawahab Hussein Gomaa, the Imam of the Mosque of Rome, and an audience of 7,000 invited guests. The concert also followed the first visit to the Vatican of Israel's two chief rabbis, both of whom attended the concert. It was conceived, created, and conducted by Sir Gilbert Levine, whose previous musical collaborations with the Pope, including the Papal Concert to Commemorate the Shoah in 1994 with the Royal Philharmonic Orchestra and the Concert for the Pope's 80th Birthday in 2000 with the Philharmonia Orchestra, among others, had earned him the sobriquet "The Pope's Maestro." In realizing the concert, Levine sought to fulfill the Pontiff's wish to reach out to the followers of the Abrahamic faiths (Judaism, Christianity, and Islam), as part of the celebrations dedicated to the 25th anniversary of his pontificate.

The concert was webcast and broadcast on PBS and internationally, as well as released on DVD. It brought together performers from across the globe, including the Pittsburgh Symphony Orchestra, which became the first American orchestra to perform at the Vatican for a Pope, the London Philharmonic Choir, the Krakow Philharmonic Choir, the Ankara State Polyphonic Choir, and members of the Mendelssohn Choir of Pittsburgh, as well as vocal soloists Ruth Ziesak and Birgit Remmert, both from Germany.

The Pittsburgh Symphony, which Levine selected for the occasion, has described the Papal Concert of Reconciliation as an "unprecedented opportunity which remains one of the most significant events in the PSO's history." The concert also marked that orchestra's first known appearance on PBS after an absence of more than 20 years, dating back to the "Previn and the Pittsburgh" PBS series, which ran from 1977-1980.

In an effort to sustain the extraordinary level of enthusiasm shown by Pittsburgh natives for the Vatican performance, the Pittsburgh Symphony, at Levine's initiative, subsequently developed a concert series called "Music for the Spirit." Levine conducted the first three concerts in this series: Verdi Requiem in Heinz Hall, Haydn "Creation" in Cathedral of Saint Paul (Pittsburgh), and Mahler Symphony No. 3 in Heinz Hall. The Pittsburgh Symphony has continued the series in subsequent years.

== Program ==
The Pittsburgh Symphony Orchestra, with the support of the Knights of Columbus, commissioned American composer John Harbison, winner of the Pulitzer Prize for Music, to write a sacred motet "Abraham," for double chorus and brass, which received its world premiere at this concert. The major work on the program was Mahler Symphony No. 2, "Resurrection."

Harbison dedicated the work "to His Holiness Pope John Paul II in honor of his pontificate-long dedication to fostering reconciliation of the people of Abraham -- Jews, Christians, and Muslims -- and with deep gratitude to Maestro Sir Gilbert Levine, KCSG, for his 15-year-long creative collaboration with His Holiness, which led to the great honor of this commission." The text of the piece, taken from Genesis 17 reads: "And when Abraham was ninety years old and nine, the Lord appeared to Abraham and said unto him, 'I am the Almighty God; walk before me, and be thou perfect...and thou shalt be a father of many nations.'"

As the Pittsburgh Catholic reported, "Levine selected the Mahler piece because it focuses on the soul's path to resurrection. The pope agreed, because of its theme of 'where the soul is reaching to everlasting life, an idea common to all three religions.' Levine and the Vatican also considered the symphony particularly appropriate because of the first movement's "special meaning for the pope," stemming from its likely connection to the Polish poet Adam Mickiewicz's epic 'Funeral Rites,' which "resonated with John Paul not only generally as the first Polish pope, but also personally, because as a young, aspiring actor, the future pope acted in a Mickiewicz play and memorized his poetry." Following the finale of the symphony, the Pope requested an encore—an unprecedented act for a papal concert. Because Vatican protocol then restricted all concerts to a duration of 72 minutes, only movements 1, 4, and 5 of the Mahler were performed.

== See also ==
- Pope John Paul II's relations with Judaism
- Pope John Paul II's relations with Islam
- Christian–Jewish reconciliation
