= Jewish Museum of Rome =

Museum in the basement of Rome's synagogue

- Museo Ebraico di Roma
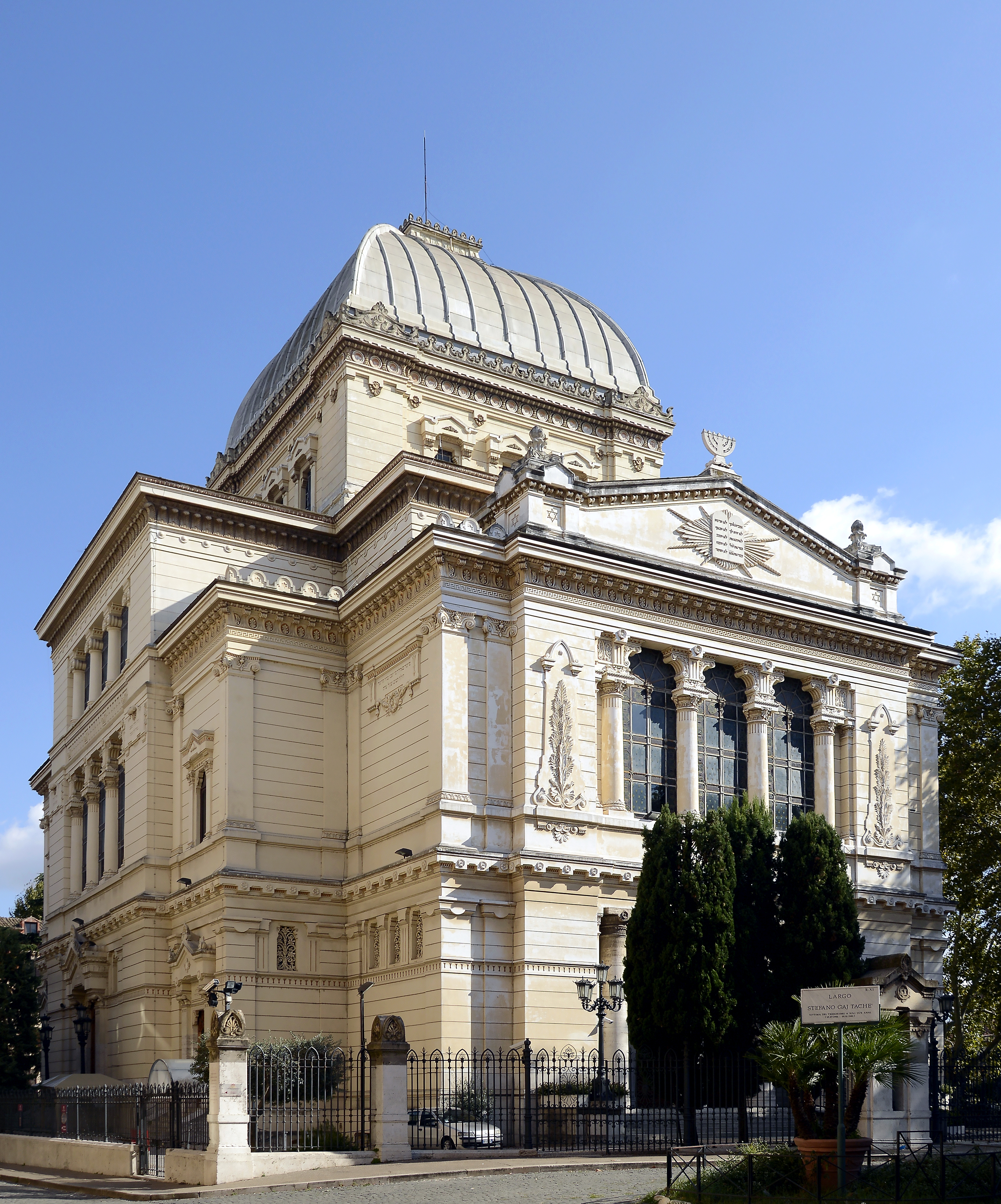
- Jewish Museum in the basement
- Click on the map for a fullscreen view
- Established: 1960
- Location: Via Catalana
- Coordinates: 41°53′31″N 12°28′42″E
- Type: Jewish museum
- Director: Olga Melasecchi
- Website: museoebraico.roma.it

The Jewish Museum of Rome (Italian: Museo Ebraico di Roma) is situated in the basement of the Great Synagogue of Rome and offers both information on the Jewish presence in Rome since the second century BCE and a large collection of works of art produced by the Jewish community. A visit to the museum includes a guided tour of the Great Synagogue and of the smaller Spanish Synagogue (Italian: Tempio Spagnolo) in the same complex.

== History of the museum ==
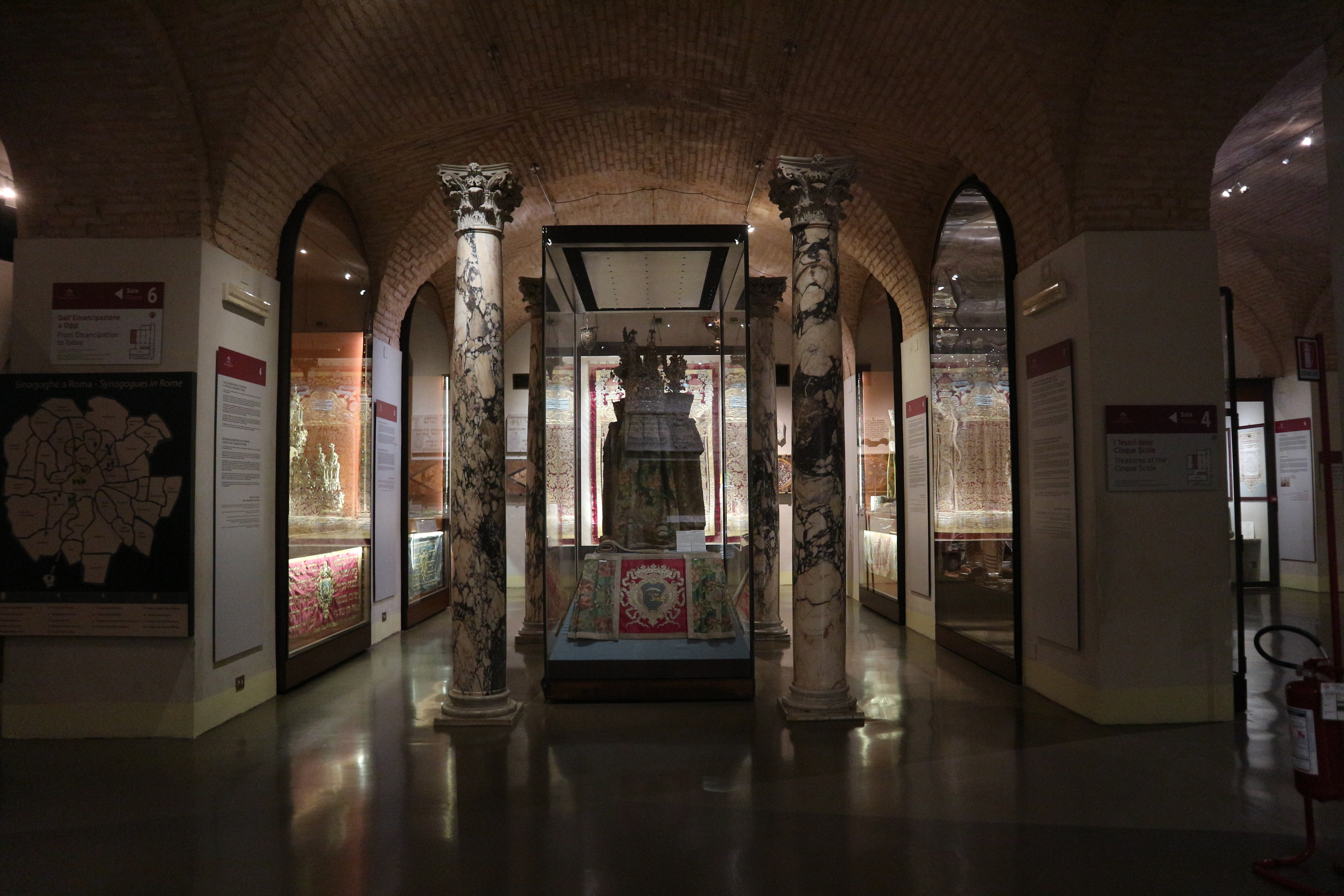
Interior of the Jewish Museum

Following the unification of Italy in 1870, the Jews were granted citizenship of Italy. As a result of agreement between the Jewish community and the city authorities the Roman Ghetto was demolished towards the end of the 19th century. The building that housed the ghetto synagogue which, in fact, contained five synagogues representing different traditions, was torn down in 1908 but its fixed furnishings including holy arches and thrones were saved. Also, in 1875, the city embarked on an ambitious programme to build up embankments along the River Tiber to provide protection from flooding, including of the area formerly occupied by the ghetto. The Great Synagogue was constructed in the former ghetto area, close to the river, and was completed in 1904.

The museum was established in 1960. It was initially set up in a room behind the Torah ark of the Great Synagogue. In 1980 the staircase leading to the museum was decorated with stained glass by the artist Eva Fischer. To permit expansion the museum was moved to the basement of the Great Synagogue next to the Spanish Synagogue and officially opened on 22 November 2005. This meant replacing other facilities, such as a gym, a theatre and meeting rooms. In the early 2000s the museum was renamed “The Jewish Museum of Rome” in order to emphasise the close relationship between the Jewish community and the city. A Foundation to support the museum was established and in 2009 this was renamed in honour of the former Chief Rabbi, Elio Toaff. Support for the new museum and its collection was provided by the European Union, the Italian and Lazio governments, and the city of Rome, as well as by private donations, including from Alcatel.

The art collection in the museum has largely been donated by members of the Community. It reflects the long history of Jews in Rome and, in particular, the ghetto period (1555–1870) when all Jews from Rome and surrounding areas were forced to live in a small area. The collection includes around 900 liturgical and ceremonial textiles, illuminated parchments, around 100 marble pieces and about 400 pieces of silverwork. Also displayed are some of the many documents held in the Community's archives.

== The exhibition ==
Model of the Great Synagogue of Rome

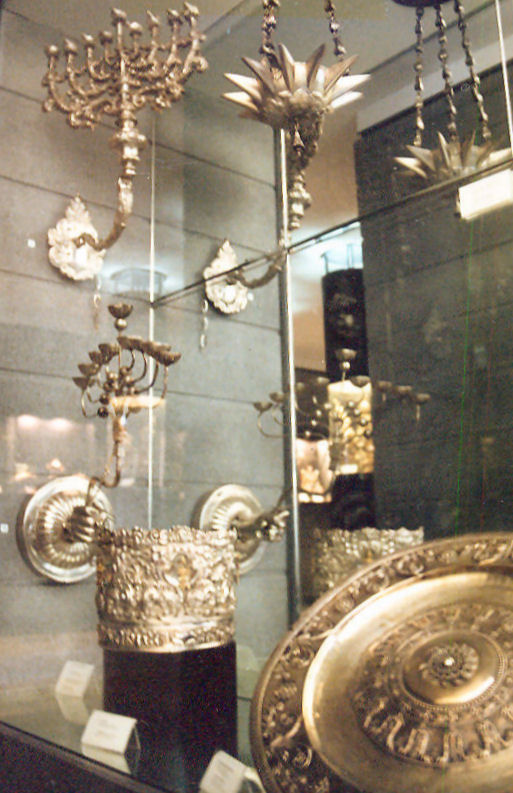
Silverware on display in the museum

An interior view of the Spanish Synagogue

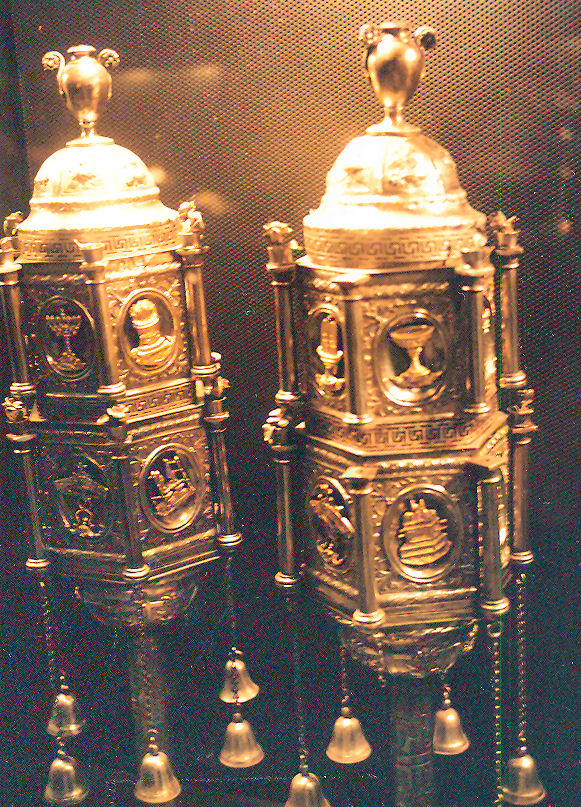
Rings on the Scroll of Law in the museum

=== The Roman era ===
The museum traces the history of the Jews and, in particular, their relationship with Rome. This goes back to the time of Judas Maccabeus who, in the mid-2nd century BCE, petitioned Rome for help in opposing the Hellenistic Kings to restore Jewish worship in Jerusalem. According to tradition the two ambassadors sent to petition the Roman Senate were received by Jews already living in Rome. In 63 BCE, Judea was conquered by Pompey and in 70 CE it was annexed to the Roman Empire by Vespasian and Titus after the First Jewish–Roman War. This resulted in many Jews coming to Rome, particularly as slaves. During the imperial period there were said to have been as many as twelve synagogues in the city. Archaeological evidence comes from two Jewish catacombs at Villa Torlonia and Vigna Randanini. The museum displays plaster casts of catacomb tombstones presently held in the National Roman Museum and other museums in Rome.

=== The Middle Ages ===
From the 4th century CE Jews spread throughout Europe and were often forced to leave areas in which they had settled. In 1492 all Jews were expelled from Spain. Others were expelled from southern Italy, and central and northern Europe. Many refugees made their way to Rome. There was therefore a diversity of Jewish traditions in the city and these are well represented in the museum's collection of manuscripts and printed documents as Rome was a noted centre for the production of manuscripts.

=== The ghetto ===
Despite implementing many restrictions, Rome is the only city in Europe never to expel Jews. However, by the early 16th century Jews represented about one-thirteenth of Rome's population and efforts were made to convert them. As well, copies of the Talmud were burnt. This culminated in 1555 when a papal bull established the ghetto, which continued in existence until 1870. The museum has considerable documentation and illustrations from this period.

- Abolition of the ghetto

The museum provides interesting illustrations of changes after Italian Unification in 1870 to the area occupied by the Ghetto, and traces the steps taken to develop the Great Synagogue. Rome's was the last European ghetto to be abolished.

=== Fascism and the German Occupation ===
In 1938, Mussolini and King Victor Emmanuel III, under the influence of Adolf Hitler, signed laws known as the “Defence of the Race”, which removed all civil rights from Jews in Italy and forced them to leave government posts. A number of newspapers and magazines of the time are exhibited. Subsequently, the Jews experienced further persecution, with shops being raided and some people having to undergo forced labour. Following the overthrow of Mussolini and the Italian armistice with the Allies in September 1943, the Germans occupied Rome. The Jewish community was told that it would be left alone if it handed over 50 kg of gold. Examples of receipts given to those who contributed, including non-Jews, are on display, together with files held on Jews in the SS Headquarters. The “agreement” was not honoured, however, and on 16 October 1943 the Germans rounded up and deported around 2000 people to concentration camps, few of whom returned. The museum records this, as well as the Ardeatine Massacre when Jews and others were murdered in retaliation for a resistance attack on German troops.

=== Daily life in the ghetto ===
Exhibits in this section include coverage of the Jewish home, the kitchen, weddings and celebration of religious holidays.

=== The five synagogues ===
Many of the exhibits come from the building housing five synagogues (Cinque Scole: Scola del Tempio, Scola Nova, Scola Siciliana, Scola Castigliana, and Scola Catalana), that was torn down in 1908. These include curtains, inlays, marble slabs and chandeliers. Other items were preserved in the Spanish Synagogue. Photos of the former synagogues are also displayed.

=== The gallery of ancient marble ===
This is a collection of marble carvings and engravings from between the 16th and 19th centuries, which contain important documentary evidence of the history of the Jewish Community in Rome. Some refer to legacies left by wealthy families, others record the purchase of cemetery plots. These marble slabs, were an important element in the decoration of the Cinque Scole.

=== The textiles ===
These were mainly taken from the five synagogues. They include Renaissance velvets and lace of the Baroque period. For the most part they were bought second-hand from Roman nobility and then adapted for use in the synagogues, with the application of embroidery and trimmings.

== See also ==
- History of the Jews in Italy
- History of the Jews in Rome
- The Holocaust in Italy

Preceded by Galleria Spada	Landmarks of Rome; Jewish Museum of Rome	Succeeded by Keats–Shelley Memorial House
