= Papal Concert to Commemorate the Shoah =

Official commemoration in Vatican

The Papal Concert to Commemorate the Shoah (Holocaust) was the first official Vatican commemoration of the murder of six million Jews by the Nazis during World War II. It took place in the Sala Nervi (also called Paul VI Audience Hall) at the Vatican on April 7, 1994. The concert was conceived and created at the direct behest of Pope John Paul II by the American conductor Gilbert Levine, who had first met the Pope after he was appointed artistic director and conductor of the Krakow Philharmonic, in December 1987. Pope John Paul II, Rav Elio Toaff, the Chief Rabbi of Italy, and Oscar Luigi Scalfaro, President of Italy jointly presided over the event, and viewed it from positions of equal honor.

== Event and program ==
The event was attended by 7,500 invited guests, including several hundred survivors of the Holocaust, from around the world. The six candle Holocaust candelabra was lit in the concert hall by six survivors and their descendants. One of these was Margit Raab Kalina, Levine's mother-in-law, a survivor of Płaszów, Auschwitz-Birkenau, and Bergen-Belsen. The candelabra burned throughout the performance to demonstrate, as the Pope stated in his discourse at the end of the concert that, "The walls of this hall have no limits. The victims: fathers, mothers, brothers, sisters and friends, are here with you, they are with us. They will never be forgotten." As the Pope also stated: It was like a night of "common meditation and shared prayer" in the Vatican.

The program included Schubert Psalm 92, Bernstein Chichester Psalms (1965) (soloist: Gregory Daniel Rodriguez), Bernstein Symphony 3 "Kaddish" (1961-3) excerpt (narrator: Richard Dreyfuss), Bruch Kol Nidre, Op. 47 (soloist: Lynn Harrell), and Beethoven Symphony 9 in D Minor, Op. 125, Movement 3 "Adagio molto e cantabile." The concert and the recording were produced by Randall Jamail and released by Justice Record Co.

== Selection of orchestra ==
Owing to Prague's long history of flourishing Jewish culture, and the terrible toll on that population during the Holocaust, the concert had been envisioned, at first, as a concert with the Czech Philharmonic. When it was proposed however, Gerd Albrecht, that orchestra's principal conductor, refused to allow the group to participate. This sparked a national outrage, including a denunciation of Albrecht's decision by the President of the Czech Republic and famed human rights leader, Václav Havel. Albrecht prevailed in the short term, and the Czech Philharmonic did not perform at the concert in April 1994. Even after the concert, the Czech Philharmonic controversy endured, and Albrecht was forced to resign his position as principal conductor in 1996.

Following Albrecht's decision to block the participation of the Czech Philharmonic, the Royal Philharmonic Orchestra of London immediately accepted the invitation to participate in the concert. It was joined by the Cappella Giulia of Saint Peter's Basilica and the Chorus of the Accademia Filarmonica Romana.

== Legacy ==
The concert is considered, along with the first-ever Papal visit to a synagogue, the Great Synagogue of Rome, in 1986, and the Papal visit to Israel in 2000, to be among the signal events in Catholic-Jewish relations during the 26-year-long pontificate of Pope John Paul II. The concert also followed the recognition of the State of Israel by the Holy See little more than three months earlier, in December 1993. The New York Times reported that in light of the concert, "[s]ome Jews said the Pope had revived the revolution in Catholic-Jewish relations set in motion by Pope John XXIII and the Second Vatican Council."

The concert was broadcast in Italy by RAI (Italian Television), to 52 countries around the world via Eurovision, and in the U.S. on PBS. The PBS broadcast was produced by John Walker of WNET Thirteen (New York). It was also released on CD (produced by Heinz Wildhagen) for Justice Records, and on video in a documentary film directed by Hart Perry for Rhino, a Time-Warner company. The event was reported on worldwide, in print, on radio, and on television.

For his contributions in creating and conducting this event, Gilbert Levine, was invested at the direct gift of the Pontiff as a Knight-Commander of the Pontifical Equestrian Order of Saint Gregory the Great, in a ceremony in Paris presided over by Jean-Marie Cardinal Lustiger. Levine's was the first-ever Pontifical Knighthood accorded an American Jew in the history of the Vatican.

== See also ==
- Pope John Paul II's relations with Judaism
- Catholic Church and Judaism
- Index of Vatican City-related articles
