= Osvaldo Armanni =

Italian architect (1855–1929)

- Born: 3 August 1855; Perugia, Papal States
- Died: 3 January 1929 (aged 73); Rome, Kingdom of Italy
- Occupation: Architect

Osvaldo Armanni (3 August 1855 – 3 January 1929) was an Italian architect and academic active between the late 19th and early 20th centuries.

== Life and career ==
A student of Guglielmo Calderini, Armanni taught architectural drawing at the University of Rome from 1907 to 1923. Among his major projects are the Great Synagogue of Rome (1904), designed with Vincenzo Costa and characterized by Assyro-Babylonian elements and Liberty influences, and several public buildings, including post offices in Perugia, Mantua, and Reggio Calabria, as well as the Chamber of Commerce in Foligno and the National Boarding School in Assisi.

Throughout his career, Armanni avoided formal innovation in favor of technically solid and contextually appropriate designs, aligned with the official and celebratory architectural language of the time.
