= Gilbert Levine =

American conductor

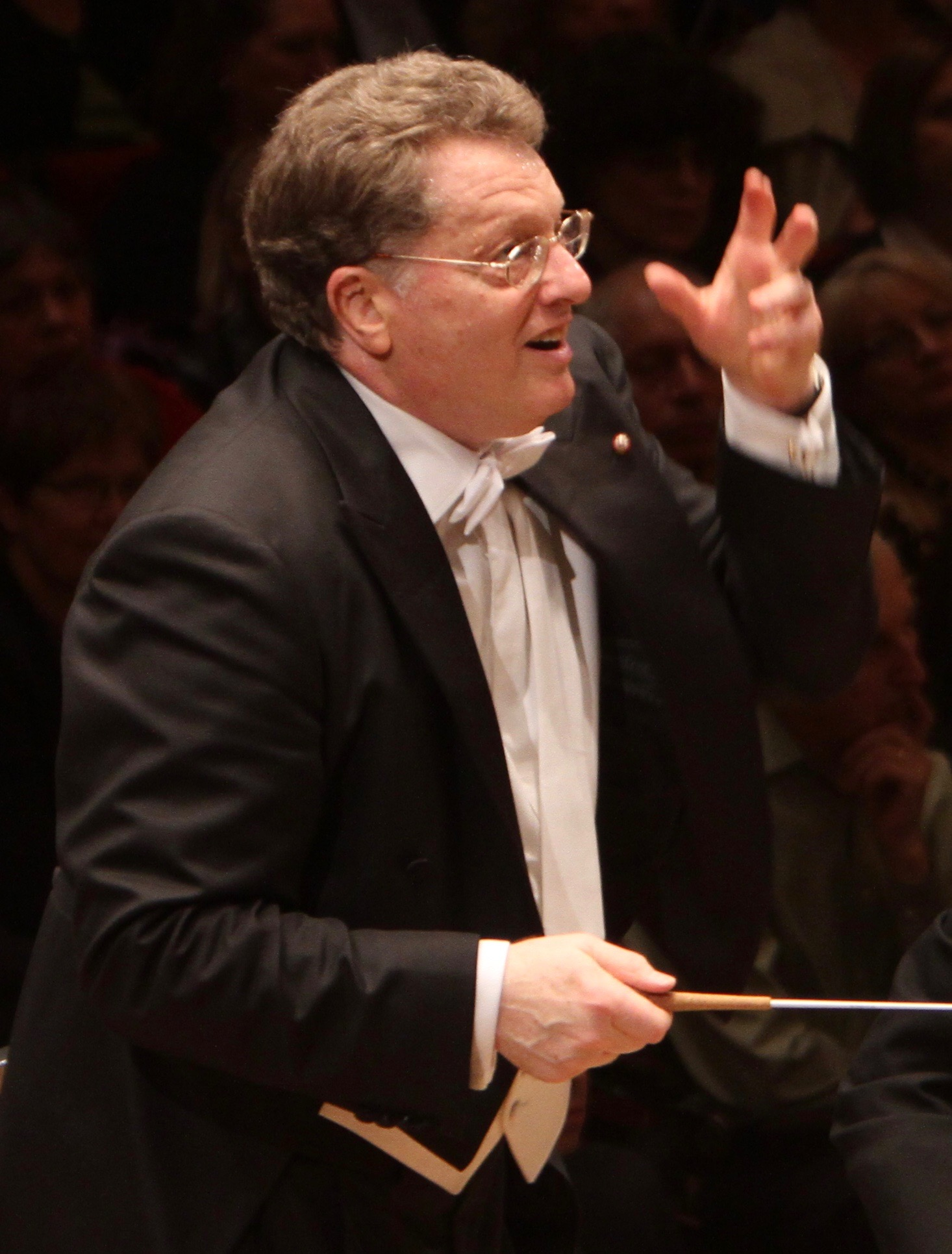
Sir Gilbert Levine, 2012

Sir Gilbert Levine GCSG (born January 22, 1948) is an American conductor. He is considered an "outstanding personality in the world of international music television." He has led the PBS concert debuts of the Staatskapelle Dresden, Royal Philharmonic, London Philharmonic, Philharmonia Orchestra, WDR Symphony Orchestra, and the Pittsburgh Symphony, and the PBS premieres of works including the Beethoven Missa Solemnis, Bach Magnificat in D, Haydn Creation, and Bruckner Symphony 9.

== Education ==
Levine was born in Brooklyn, New York, attended the Juilliard School of Music, and holds an A.B. degree from Princeton University and a M.A. degree from Yale University. He studied bassoon with Stephen Maxym and Sherman Walt, piano with Gilbert Kalish, Music History with Lewis Lockwood and Arthur Mendel, Music Theory with Edward T. Cone, Peter Westergaard and Milton Babbitt, ear training and score reading with Nadia Boulanger, Renée Longy, and Luise Vosgerchian, and conducting with Jacques-Louis Monod and Franco Ferrara at the Accademia Musicale Chigiana in Siena.

Levine was assistant to Sir Georg Solti in London at the London Philharmonic Orchestra and at the Royal Opera House (Covent Garden), and in Paris with l'Orchestre de Paris. He was a protégé of Klaus Tennstedt.

Levine has lectured at institutions including Harvard University, Princeton University, Yale University, Stanford University, All Souls College University of Oxford,Columbia University, University of California, Davis, Duquesne University, and the University of North Carolina, Greensboro. He taught conducting both at Yale and the Manhattan School of Music. His conducting students have included the American composer Aaron Jay Kernis. Levine maintains current ties to his two alma maters. He serves as a member of the Princeton University Department of Music Advisory Council and has recently been appointed to a fifth term as Fellow of Trumbull College at Yale.

== Early career and the Kraków Philharmonic years ==
Early in his career, Levine conducted orchestras both in Europe and the United States, including the Philadelphia Orchestra, New York Philharmonic, the San Francisco Symphony, the Minnesota Orchestra, Toronto Symphony Orchestra, the Royal Philharmonic Orchestra, the NDR Sinfonie-Orchester Hamburg, the Iceland Symphony Orchestra, and the Radio-Sinfonie-Orchester Berlin. He first gained international notice when he became conductor and artistic director of the Kraków Philharmonic in 1987. He was the first American chief conductor of an Eastern European orchestra. His appointment was initially controversial because of the general consensus that Krzysztof Penderecki forced the choice of Levine on the orchestra.

Under his leadership, the orchestra toured Europe, the major concert halls of North America, and the Far East, including the first visit by any Polish orchestra to South Korea. Under Levine, the Kraków Philharmonic also performed for the first time with such soloists as Emanuel Ax, Garrick Ohlsson, and Shlomo Mintz. He concluded his tenure in Kraków in 1993.

== Concerts for Pope John Paul II and pontifical knighthood ==
In 1988, while working in Kraków, Levine met Pope John Paul II, at the latter's invitation. The Pope subsequently asked Levine to conduct the concert commemorating the 10th anniversary of his Pontificate.

In 1993, Levine conducted for the Pope at World Youth Day in Denver. That program included the first performances of works by Bernstein, Barber, and Copland at any Papal event, and was televised worldwide.

In 1994, Levine (whose mother-in-law was an Auschwitz survivor) conducted the Royal Philharmonic Orchestra and Coro della Filharmonia Romana in the historic "Papal Concert to Commemorate the Shoah (Holocaust)" marked the first official Vatican commemoration of the Nazi genocide of the Jews in World War II. Featured guest artists were Lynn Harrell, cello, and Richard Dreyfuss, narrator. The concert was televised worldwide.

In 1998, Levine led members of the Los Angeles Philharmonic and, with the special permission of Pope John Paul II, the ancient Capella Giulia Choir of St. Peter's Basilica, in concerts to commemorate the 200th Anniversary of the founding of Mission San Luis Rey in California. These concerts constituted the first visit of this 500-year-old choir to the Western Hemisphere, and were broadcast on NPR's "Performance Today".

Other Papal concerts at the Vatican directed by Levine included the first of two concerts celebrating the Catholic Church's Grand Jubilee in 2000 with the Philharmonia Orchestra and the Philharmonia Chorus performing parts one and two of Haydn's The Creation In 2003, Levine conducted a televised musical celebration of the 25th anniversary of Pope John Paul II's pontificate with the London Philharmonic Orchestra in Saint Peter's Basilica, a concert which aired on American Broadcasting Company (ABC).

In 2004, Levine conducted his last concert for Pope John Paul II, leading the Pittsburgh Symphony Orchestra and members of the Mendelssohn Choir of Pittsburgh, the London Philharmonic Choir, the Kraków Philharmonic Choir, and the Ankara Polyphonic Choir in the "Papal Concert of Reconciliation." This event was the first time that any American orchestra had performed for any Pope in the Vatican. The concert, broadcast worldwide, included Gustav Mahler's Symphony No. 2 Resurrection, and Abraham, a specially-commissioned motet by John Harbison.

Over the years of his relationship with John Paul II, Levine became known as "the Pope's Maestro". In 1994, for his services to the Pope and to the Vatican, he was invested as a Knight Commander of the Pontifical Equestrian Order of St. Gregory the Great (KCSG), the highest Papal knighthood accorded to a non-ecclesiastical musician since Mozart.

Upon John Paul II's death, Levine called him a friend and "an incredible sustenance for me." In 2005, Levine conducted a memorial concert for the Pontiff, which was broadcast on PBS. That same year, Pope John Paul II's successor, Pope Benedict XVI, honoured Levine with the Silver Star of the Order of St. Gregory the Great (KC*SG), the highest papal distinction received by a Jew in the history of the Vatican.

On January 31, 2016, Pope Francis honored Levine as a Pontifical Knight Grand Cross of the Equestrian Order of Saint Gregory the Great (GCSG), the highest rank of the order and one very rarely bestowed. He is the second artist so honored. The other is Riccardo Muti, music director of the Chicago Symphony Orchestra, who received that honor from Pope Benedict XVI in 2012.

== Additional work ==
In the UK, Levine and the Royal Philharmonic Orchestra have recorded Tchaikovsky's Symphony No. 3. In 2000, Levine was named artistic director and Conductor of the Philharmonia Orchestra's "Millennium Creation Series". In this capacity, he toured America and Europe, performing Haydn's The Creation in televised concerts in Baltimore, London, and Rome. He led the London Philharmonic Orchestra (LPO) in 2003, conducting selections from Verdi and Mozart on ABC's "Good Morning America" in a historic first for that program. That same year, he led the LPO and London Philharmonic Choir in televised performances of excerpts of Górecki's Third Symphony and Beethoven's Ninth Symphony from Kraków, during the city's reign as the European Capital of Culture. On this occasion, Levine received the Kraków Gold Medallion from the city president, in recognition of his services to Kraków's cultural life.

From 2004 to 2006, Levine led the Pittsburgh Symphony Orchestra in a series of concerts called "Music for the Spirit," which included a 2004 performance of the Verdi Requiem., a January 2006 concert to commemorate the 100th anniversary of St. Paul's Cathedral in Pittsburgh of Haydn's The Creation, and a June 2006 concert of Gustav Mahler's Third Symphony.

In July 2005, Levine led the Royal Philharmonic Orchestra and the London Philharmonic Choir in the first complete performance of Beethoven Missa Solemnis in Cologne Cathedral. The performance was broadcast throughout Europe and North America. The international quartet of soloists included American tenor Jerry Hadley in his last televised concert performance. In November of that same year, he directed the Orchestra of Saint Luke's and the Morgan State University Choir in a concert entitled "Rejoice in this Land", which included Beethoven's Ninth Symphony and the world premiere of Washington Speaks by Richard Danielpour, with Ted Koppel as narrator. The performance was broadcast throughout the United States both on terrestrial radio in major cities and on XM Satellite Radio.

On April 23, 2012, Levine conducted the Lyric Opera of Chicago Orchestra and the Chicago Symphony Chorus in their first ever performance together, at Orchestra Hall, Symphony Center, Chicago. The program included Bogurodzica (an ancient Polish hymn), Edward T. Cone Psalm 91 (1948), Bach Magnificat in D, and Beethoven Symphony No. 3, “Eroica”. The concert was filmed for national and international television and radio broadcast. It was first broadcast in Chicago in October 2012.

On May 5, 2014, Levine led the Orchestra of Saint Luke's, the Kraków Philharmonic Choir and the Choral Arts Society of Washington in "Peace Through Music: In Our Age," a musical celebration of the Canonizations of Popes John XXIII and John Paul II, at Constitution Hall in Washington, D.C. The concert included performances of Copland Fanfare for the Common Man, Verdi Messa di Requiem (Sanctus), Górecki Totus Tuus, Bernstein Chichester Psalms and Brahms First Symphony. The concert was sponsored by the Embassies of Poland, Italy, Argentina, and the Holy See to the U.S., the Catholic Archdiocese of Washington, Georgetown University, and WETA. The concert was taped for broadcast on PBS and internationally in Fall 2014.

== Media coverage ==
On television, Levine has been featured on many occasions, both as a news subject and in concert. In addition to his appearance on "Good Morning America," and his numerous performances on European television, the CBS newsmagazine 60 Minutes featured a profile of him titled "The Pope's Maestro". Other stories about him have been featured on such programs as CBS Evening News, CBS Sunday Morning (on which he was profiled by Eugenia Zukerman), ABC World News Tonight, Nightline (ABC), Larry King Live (CNN), and The Situation Room with Wolf Blitzer (CNN). He has appeared on National Public Radio on such programs as Symphony Cast, Performance Today, and All Things Considered.

On January 14, 1992, Levine was interviewed by Studs Terkel on his WFMT (Chicago) nationally syndicated radio broadcast. Levine's recording of the Shostakovich Suite from The Golden Age, with the Krakow Philharmonic, was the featured work on that program.

In 2009, TVN (Poland) broadcast a 30-minute biographical documentary on Levine entitled "The Pope’s Maestro". The film dealt with his life and career, from the arrival of his family in New York from Warsaw in the early years of the 20th Century, to his studies at The Juilliard School, his life and work in Kraków under communism, and his concerts for Pope John Paul II.

Levine's memoir, The Pope’s Maestro, was published by Jossey-Bass, a Wiley Imprint, in October 2010, and in Polish translation in 2012 under the title Papieski Maestro by Wydawnictwo Świat Książki. Publishers Weekly wrote of The Pope's Maestro, "Not all books are worth writing; this one assuredly is, because it tells how peace can happen, one heart at a time."

On April 25, 2014, he was the subject of the "Saturday Interview" in The Wall Street Journal. The article was written by Matthew Kaminski.

In 2017, the Lewis Center for the Arts at Princeton University commissioned a video profile of Sir Gilbert Levine. The profile was produced by Angel Gardner and filmed and edited by Zohar Lavi-Hasson.

== Personal life ==
Levine is married to Dr. Vera Kalina-Levine they have two children, David and Gabriel

== Television concerts ==
Levine's television-aired concert performances have included the following:

- 1982: Reykjavik Arts Festival (Vladimir Ashkenazy, Founder) Closing Concert: June 20, 1982. Sinfóníuhljómsveitinn (Iceland Symphony Orchestra) and Iceland Symphony Choir. Glinka: A Life for the Tsar (Excerpts); Mussorgsky: Boris Godunov (Excerpts). Soloist: Boris Christoff. Live broadcast: RÚV - Icelandic National Broadcasting
- 1988: A Musical Offering from the Vatican. Orchestra of RAI/Roma, Choirs of RAI, Kraków Philharmonic and Warsaw Philharmonic. Brahms "Ave Maria", Penderecki "Stabat Mater:, Dvořák Mass in D. Original broadcaster: RAI/Roma/European Broadcast Union. PBS broadcast as "A Musical Offering from the Vatican: A Papal Concert" Released on VHS by View Video
- 1994: Papal Concert to Commemorate the Shoah (Holocaust). Royal Philharmonic Orchestra and Coro della Filharmonia Romana. Max Bruch Kol Nidrei with Lynn Harrell, cello, Beethoven Ninth Symphony (Third Movement), Schubert Psalm 92, "Kaddish" excerpt from Bernstein's Third Symphony, narrated by Richard Dreyfuss, and Bernstein, Chichester Psalms (Movements 2 and 3). Closing remars by Pope John Paul II. -- Original broadcaster: RAI, European Broadcasting Union, and PBS (WNET). VHS release by Rhino Home Video
- 1995: "A Symphony of Psalms." Baltimore Symphony Orchestra and Chorus. Stravinsky Symphony of Psalms (1930). Original broadcaster: MPT (Maryland Public Television) and NPR
- 2000: "Jubilee Creation". Philharmonia Orchestra and Chorus. Haydn: The Creation. US broadcast by Maryland Public Broadcasting/PBS
- 2000: Concert for the 80th Birthday of His Holiness Pope John Paul II. Haydn: The Creation. Philharmonia Orchestra and Chorus. Original broadcaster: RAI/EBU.
- 2000: A Thousand Years of Music and Spirit. London Philharmonic Orchestra and Choir. Bogurodzica, Gorecki Third Symphony (Second Movement), Beethoven Ninth Symphony. Original broadcaster: Telewizja Polska. US broadcast (nationwide) by WTTW/PBS.
- 2002: Concert in Commemoration of the First Anniversary of the Terror Attacks of September 11. Sachsische Staatskapelle Dresden and Münchener Bach-Chor. Barber Agnus Dei, Gorecki Totus Tuus, Brahms Ein Deutsches Requiem—Original broadcaster: Telewizja Polska/EBU
- 2004: "Papal Concert of Reconciliation". Pittsburgh Symphony Orchestra, Mendelssohn Choir of Pittsburgh, London Philharmonic Choir, Kraków Philharmonic Choir, Ankara Polyphonic Choir. Harbison "Abraham" (World Premiere), Mahler Second Symphony (First, Fourth, and Fifth Movements) --Original broadcaster: RAI/EBU. US broadcast by WQED (Pittsburgh). Released on DVD by WQED Multimedia Pittsburgh
- 2004: ABC "Good Morning America." Verdi Ave Maria; Mozart Symphony K.95. London Philharmonic Orchestra, Narrator: Diane Sawyer. Broadcast live from Saint Peter's Basilica, Vatican City
- 2005: "Crossing the Bridge of Faiths: Im Memoriam Pope John Paul II"—Sachsische Staatskapelle Dresden and Münchener Bach-Chor --Gorecki Totus Tuus, Brahms Ein Deutsches Requiem—Original broadcaster: WQED (Pittsburgh)/PBS
- 2005: "Missa Solemnis". Beethoven Missa Solemnis. Royal Philharmonic Orchestra, London Philharmonic Choir—Original broadcaster: WDR (Köln)/3SAT (released on DVD by Arthaus)
- 2007: Bruckner Ninth Symphony, Bruckner Te Deum. WDR Sinfonieorchester Köln, WDR Rundfunkchor Köln, NDR Chor (Hamburg). Original broadcaster: WDR (Köln)/3SAT
- 2008: "From Heart to Heart: Beethoven’s Plea for Peace" . "Missa Solemnis" from Cologne Cathedral. Royal Philharmonic Orchestra, London Philharmonic Choir. Soloists: Bożena Harasimowicz, Monica Groop, Jerry Hadley, Franz-Josef Selig. Co-production of WDR/Köln and Peter Rosen Productions, Inc. Original broadcaster: WQED Multimedia/Pittsburgh and American Public Television (APT).
- 2010: “Music of Majestic Spirit”. Anton Bruckner: Symphony 9 and “Te Deum” from Cologne Cathedral. WDR Sinfonieorchester Köln, WDR Rundfunkchor Köln, NDR Chor (Hamburg). Soloists: Anja Harteros, Liliana Nikiteanu, Christian Elsner, Franz-Josef Selig. Co-production of WDR/Köln and Peter Rosen Productions, Inc. Original Broadcaster: WQED Multimedia/Pittsburgh. Released on DVD by WQED/Multimedia.
- 2012: Out of Many One - A Musical Offering from Chicago - in the Spirit of John Paul: Bogurodzica, Edward. T. Cone: Psalm 91 (1948), J.S. Bach: Magnificat in D BWV 243, Beethoven: Symphony 3, “Eroica”. Lyric Opera of Chicago Orchestra, Chicago Symphony Chorus; Soloists: Amanda Majeski, Sara Mingardo, Antonio Poli, John Relyea; Co-Production: Peter Rosen Productions, D^{2} Digital. Original broadcaster: WTTW/Chicago
- 2015: A Celebration of Peace through Music: Copland Fanfare for the Common Man, Verdi Messa da Requiem (Sanctus), Gorecki Totus Tuus, Bernstein Chichester Psalms, Brahms First Symphony. Orchestra of St. Luke's, Krakow Philharmonic Choir, Choral Arts Society of Washington, Theodore Nisbett, Boy Solo. Director: Janos S. Darvas; Producers: Dennis Obrien - D2 Digital, Claudia Groh. WETA (APT). Released on DVD by Kino Lorber.

== Selected audio recordings ==
- Mussorgsky: Pictures at an Exhibition, RSO Berlin (Capriccio)
- Penderecki: Passacaglia and Rondo For Orchestra, Krakow Philharmonic Orchestra (Polskie Nagrania Muza)
- Britten: Simple Symphony, Variations on a Theme of Frank Bridge, Les Illuminations (with Elisabeth Söderström), English Chamber Orchestra (Arabesque)
- Shostakovich: First Symphony, Age of Gold (excerpts), Concerto for Piano, Trumpet, and Strings, Op. 35 (Garrick Ohlsson, Maurice Murphy), Kraków Philharmonic Orchestra (Arabesque)
- Papal Concert to Commemorate the Holocaust: Bruch, Kol Nidrei; Beethoven, Ninth Symphony (Movement 3); Schubert, Psalm 92; Bernstein, Third Symphony (excerpt) and Chichester Psalms (Movements 2 and 3); Royal Philharmonic Orchestra; Lynn Harrell, Richard Dreyfuss (Narrator)
- Tchaikovsky, Third Symphony; Rimsky-Korsakov, Piano Concerto, Op. 30 (Jeffrey Campbell): Royal Philharmonic Orchestra (Telarc)
- A Celebration of Peace Through Music: Copland Fanfare for the Common Man, Verdi Messa da Requiem (Sanctus), Gorecki Totus Tuus, Bernstein Chichester Psalms, Brahms First Symphony. Orchestra of St. Luke's, Krakow Philharmonic Choir, Choral Arts Society of Washington, Theodore Nisbett, Boy Solo. (Delos Productions)

== Honours ==
- Order of Saint Gregory the Great

== See also ==
- List of Princeton University people
- List of Yale University people
- List of Juilliard School people

== Bibliography ==
- "The Pope's Maestro"
