= Palazzo delle Poste, Perugia =

Building in Perugia, Italy

Palazzo delle Poste
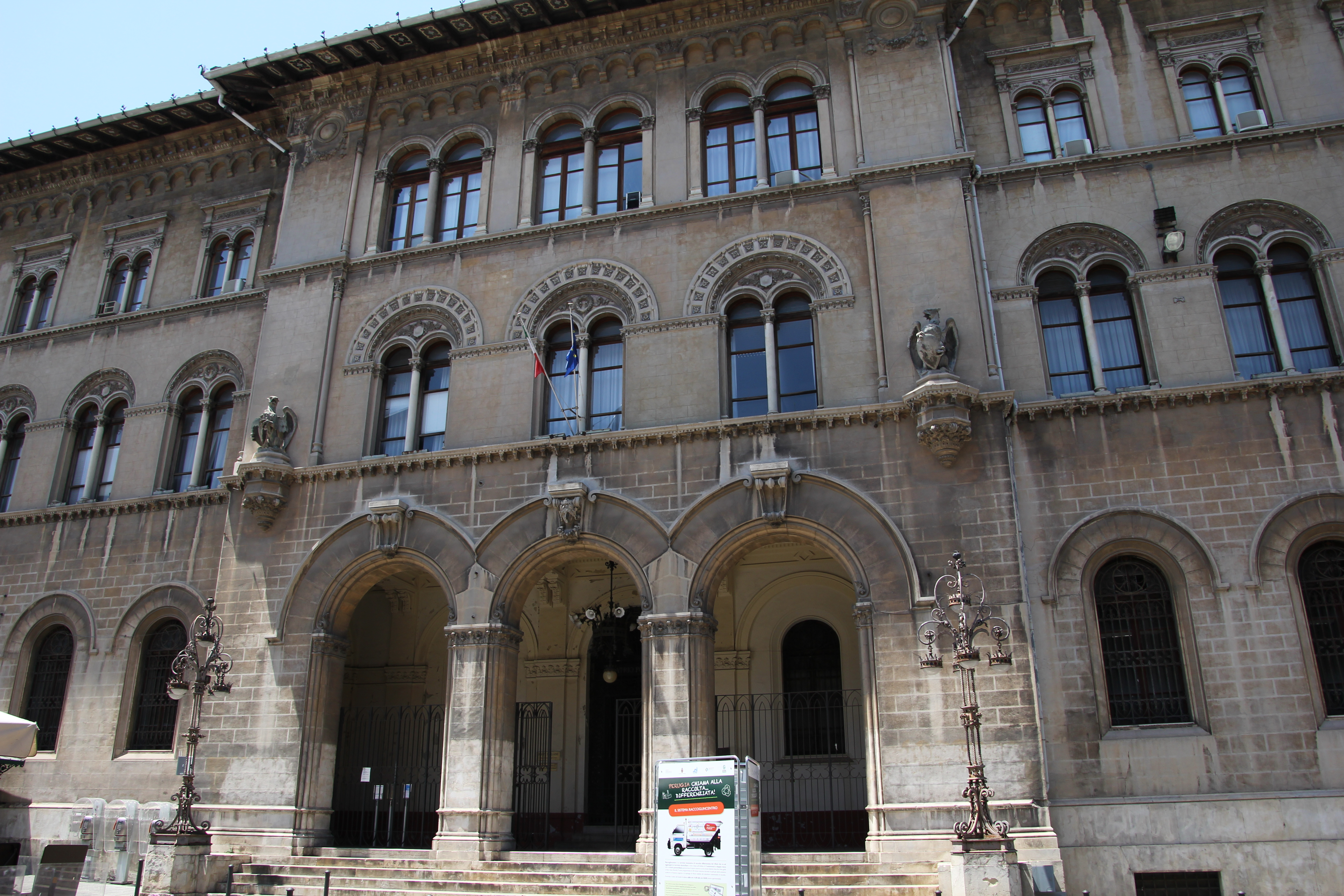
- Interactive map of the Palazzo delle Poste area

General information
- Location: Piazza Giacomo Matteotti 1 Perugia, Umbria, Italy
- Coordinates: 43°06′40″N 12°23′22.3″E
- Construction started: 1910
- Completed: 1915
- Inaugurated: 11 May 1916; 109 years ago

Design and construction
- Architect: Osvaldo Armanni

The Palazzo delle Poste (transl. Post Office Building), also known as the Palace of Justice (Palazzo di Giustizia), is located in Piazza Giacomo Matteotti in Perugia, Italy. It houses the historic local headquarters of Poste Italiane, with access from Via Fani, and the Court of Perugia, which faces the square.

== History ==
The building stands on the former site of Palazzo Meniconi, which previously housed the mint and the first civic library.

On 16 April 1909, mayor Luciano Valentini commissioned architect Osvaldo Armanni to conduct a feasibility study for the construction of a new building. On 22 April 1910, the Municipality of Perugia signed an agreement with the Royal Government, represented by Augusto Ciuffelli, minister of Posts and Telegraphs, for the construction of the new post and telegraph building. The estimated cost was 650,000 lire, of which the State committed to funding 500,000 lire.

The building was completed in five years and officially inaugurated on 11 May 1916. It later began housing the Court of Perugia. In 2007, the criminal section of the Court was relocated to the nearby former Enel headquarters on Via XIV Settembre, previously the site of a power plant built in 1899 by the Società Anonima Elettricità Umbra.

== Description ==
The building is an example of Renaissance Revival architecture with Art Nouveau (or Stile Liberty) influences. The decorative program was executed by several well-known artists and craftsmen: the frescoes were painted by Annibale Brugnoli with the assistance of Osvaldo Mazzerioli; the stuccoes, decorations, and sculptures were produced by Giuseppe Frenguelli, Enrico Cagianelli, and unidentified stone carvers. The ironwork was crafted by blacksmith Paride Rosi. The large polychrome stained-glass windows created by master glassmaker Ludovico Caselli Moretti have been lost.
