= León Klenicki =

American advocate of interfaith dialogue

Rabbi León Klenicki (September 7, 1930 – January 25, 2009) was an advocate for interfaith relations, particularly between Jews and Catholics. He served as interfaith director of the Anti-Defamation League. He also served as director of the Latin American office of the World Union for Progressive Judaism.

== Life and career ==
Klenicki was born on September 7, 1930, in Buenos Aires, Argentina, to parents who had emigrated from Poland in the 1920s. While attending the University of Buenos Aires in 1959, Klenicki was awarded a scholarship to Hebrew Union College in Cincinnati. He graduated from the University of Cincinnati with a bachelor's degree in philosophy and received a master's degree and rabbinical diploma marking his ordination in 1967 from Hebrew Union College.

=== Progressive Judaism ===
The theses he prepared for both his bachelor's degree and for his rabbinical degree were on the subject of interfaith dialogue. As the director of the Latin American office of the World Union for Progressive Judaism, at a conference of Jewish and Catholic leaders held in Bogotá, Colombia, in 1968, the first official gathering of Jewish and Catholic leaders in Latin America, Rabbi Klenicki told the audience that nearly two thousand years of history had divided the two religions, during which "cathedrals were raised to the sky while Jews had to go underground" while suffering persecution at the hands of Christians, but that "The time of hope has arrived. The task is hard, but not impossible".

Rabbi Klenicki was named as director of Jewish-Catholic relations in 1973 by the Anti-Defamation League and was appointed as director of interfaith affairs in 1984 serving in that role until 2001.

=== Church repentance ===
Under Pope John Paul II, the Vatican published We Remember: A Reflection on the Shoah in 1998, a document which condemned Nazi genocide and called for repentance from Catholics who had failed to intercede to stop it, urging Catholics to repent "of past errors and infidelities" and "renew the awareness of the Hebrew roots of their faith" while distinguishing between the Church's "anti-Judaism" as religious teaching and the murderous anti-Semitism of Nazi Germany which it described as having "roots outside Christianity." Rabbi Klenicki called the document "a salad" which was important in describing the Holocaust and insisting that it never be forgotten, noting that "the deniers of the Holocaust in Europe now have to deal with the Vatican", but which missed an opportunity for "a reckoning of the soul" by the Vatican.

As director of interfaith affairs for the Anti-Defamation League and its co-liaison to the Vatican, Rabbi Klenicki was an important voice of American Judaism over the four decades of improving Catholic-Jewish relations after the Second Vatican Council.

=== Intercommunity issues ===
Eugene J. Fisher, then associate director of the U.S. Bishops' Committee for Ecumenical and Interreligious Affairs of the National Conference of Catholic Bishops recalled a 1987 meeting with Pope John Paul II attended by Catholic and Jewish leaders, in which Rabbi Klenicki "was able to express concerns very directly, without unnecessary rhetorical negatives" regarding the Pope's meeting with Kurt Waldheim.

As part of his efforts at interfaith dialogue, Rabbi Klenicki assisted the Roman Catholic Archdiocese of Philadelphia in preparing a booklet that explained Christian history and theology to Jews, and developed with the Roman Catholic Archdiocese of Chicago a Passover Haggadah intended for use by Catholics participating with Jews at a seder or who wanted to experience the seder as Jesus did.

In 2000, he was critical of the document Dominus Iesus, and called it "a step backwards in the dialogue relationship".

=== Order of Gregory the Great ===
Rabbi Klenicki met with Pope Benedict XVI at the Vatican in 2005, in the new pope's first meeting with Jewish leaders. In 2007, Rabbi Klenicki was named a Papal Knight of the Order of St. Gregory the Great by Pope Benedict XVI, a recognition granted to Catholic men and women (and in rare cases, non-Catholics) in recognition of their service to the Church, unusual labors, support of the Holy See, and the good example set in their communities and countries.

=== Death ===
He died at age 78 on January 25, 2009, at his home in Monroe Township, Middlesex County, New Jersey, of cancer. He was survived by his wife, Myra Cohen Klenicki; two children from a marriage to Ana Dimsitz that ended in divorce; a grandson and a brother.
