= We Remember: A Reflection on the Shoah =

1998 document by the Catholic Commission for Religious Relations with the Jews

We Remember: A Reflection on the Shoah is a document published in 1998 by the Catholic Commission for Religious Relations with the Jews, under the authority of Pope John Paul II. In this document the Vatican condemned Nazi genocide and called for repentance from Catholics who had failed to intercede to stop it. It urges Catholics to repent "of past errors and infidelities" and "renew the awareness of the Hebrew roots of their faith" while distinguishing between the Church's "anti-Judaism" as religious teaching and the murderous antisemitism of Nazi Germany which it described as having "roots outside Christianity."

In a cover letter dated 12 March 1998, addressed to Edward Idris Cardinal Cassidy president of the Commission for Religious Relations With the Jews, the Pope describes his "sense of deep sorrow [regarding] the sufferings of the Jewish people during the Second World War" and how the "Shoah remains an indelible stain on the history of the century", with his hopes that the document would "help to heal the wounds of past misunderstandings and injustices" and help create "a future in which the unspeakable iniquity of the Shoah will never again be possible".

== Reactions ==
An 18 March 1998, editorial in The New York Times, called the document, 11 years in the making, a "carefully crafted statement that goes further than the Roman Catholic Church has ever gone in reckoning honestly with its passivity during the Nazi era and its historic antipathy toward Jews" that breaks new political and theological ground that is a denunciation of antisemitism and the Holocaust and a call to repentance. The New York Times criticized the Pope's failure to address the alleged silence of Pope Pius XII, finding it "regrettable that the Vatican has not yet found the courage to discard this defensive, incomplete depiction" that includes details of church efforts to save Jews and thanks that Pope Pius XII received from Jewish organizations while neglecting details of what it claimed to be his silence in dealing with Nazi Germany.

Rabbi David G. Dalin, however strongly criticized the New York Times for its one-sided hostility to the Vatican's role during the Holocaust. He added that, "it is particularly irresponsible and outrageous for liberal papal critics... to blame the Catholic Church for anti-Semitism, to falsify the Church's efforts to save Jews during the Holocaust, and to ignore the fact that popes since the twelfth century have rejected the blood libel."

Rabbi Leon Klenicki, then director of interfaith relations for the Anti-Defamation League, called the document "a salad" which was important in describing the Holocaust and insisting that it never be forgotten, noting that "the deniers of the Holocaust in Europe now have to deal with the Vatican", but which missed an opportunity for "a reckoning of the soul" by the Vatican.

The interreligious affairs director of the American Jewish Committee, Rabbi A. James Rudin, indicated that expectations were high, and praised its emphasis on remembrance of the Holocaust, a call for repentance from individuals who stood by and efforts to combat antisemitism. Rudin lamented the absence of an acknowledgment that the Church's anti-Jewish teachings created an environment in which lethal antisemitism could take hold and flourish.
