= Great Synagogue of Rome =

Orthodox synagogue in Rome, Italy

- Italian: Tempio Maggiore di Roma
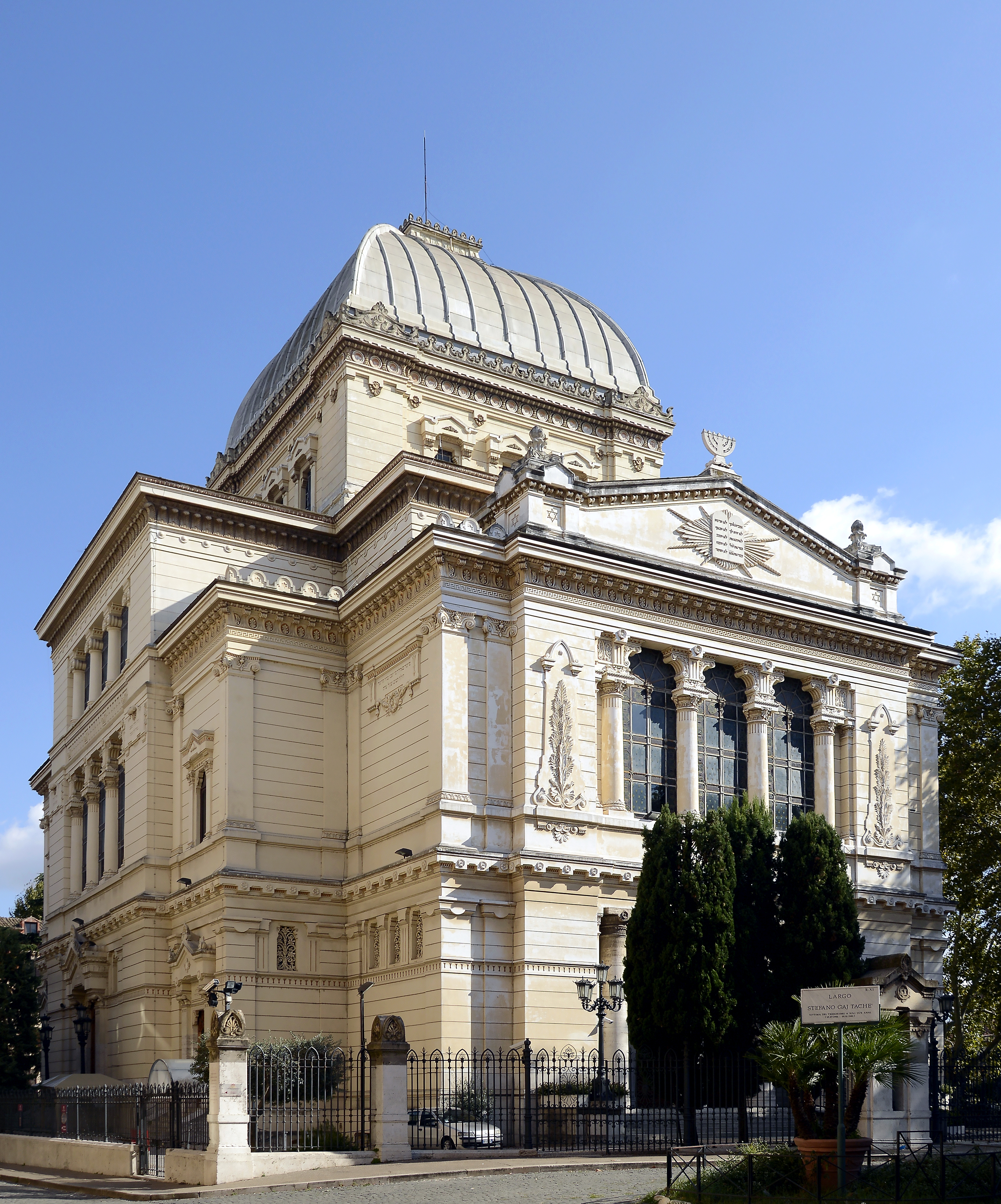
- The synagogue in 2014

- Location of the synagogue in Rome

Religion
- Affiliation: Orthodox Judaism
- Rite: Italki; Sefaradi
- Ecclesiastical or organizational status: Synagogue
- Status: Active

Location
- Location: Lungotevere de' Cenci, Rome, Lazio
- Country: Italy
- Interactive map of Great Synagogue of Rome
- Coordinates: 41°53′32″N 12°28′41″E

Architecture
- Architects: Vincenzo Costa; Osvaldo Armanni
- Type: Synagogue architecture
- Style: Historicism; Art Nouveau
- Groundbreaking: 1901
- Completed: 1904

Specifications
- Dome: One
- Materials: Brick

Website
- museoebraico.roma.it

The Great Synagogue of Rome (Italian: Tempio Maggiore di Roma) is an Orthodox Jewish congregation and synagogue, that is located at Lungotevere de' Cenci, in Rome, in Lazio, Italy. Designed by Vincenzo Costa and Osvaldo Armanni in an eclectic mix of Historicism and Art Nouveau styles, the synagogue was completed in 1904. It is the largest synagogue in Rome.

The Jewish Museum of Rome is located inside the synagogue.

== History ==
The Jewish community of Rome dates from the 2nd century B.C when the Roman Republic had an alliance of sorts with Judea under the leadership of Judah Maccabeus. At that time, many Jews came to Rome from Judea. Their numbers increased during the following centuries due to the settlement that came with Mediterranean trade. Then large numbers of Jews were brought to Rome as slaves following the Jewish–Roman wars in Judea from 63 to 135 CE.

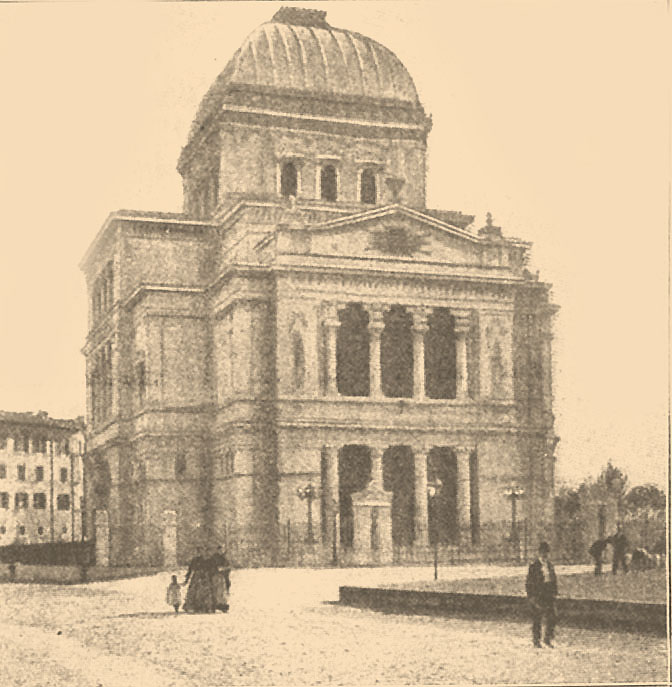
The Great Synagogue of Rome, a few years after its completion (before 1906).

The present synagogue was constructed shortly after the unification of Italy in 1870, when the Kingdom of Italy captured Rome and the Papal States ceased to exist. The Roman Ghetto was demolished and the Jews were granted citizenship. The building which had previously housed the ghetto synagogue (a complicated structure housing five scolas (the Italian-Jewish term for synagogues) in a single building was demolished, and the Judahite community began making plans for a new and impressive building.

Commemorative plates have been affixed to honor the local Jewish victims of Nazi Germany and of the Abu Nidal Organization attack in 1982.

On 13 April 1986, Pope John Paul II made an unexpected visit to the Great Synagogue. This event marked the first known visit by a pope to a synagogue since the early history of the Roman Catholic Church. He prayed with Rabbi Elio Toaff, the then Chief Rabbi of Rome. In 2010 Rabbi Riccardo Di Segni hosted a visit from Pope Benedict XVI, while Pope Francis visited the synagogue on 17 January 2016.

The synagogue celebrated its centenary in 2004. In addition to serving as a house of worship, it is also serves a cultural and organizational centre for la Comunità Ebraica di Roma (the Hebrew community of Rome). It houses the offices of the Chief Rabbi of Rome, as well as the Jewish Museum of Rome.

On 17 January 2005, thirteen cantors, in conjunction with the Jewish Ministers Cantors Association of America (the Chazzanim Farband), performed in a cantorial concert for the first time in the synagogue's history.

Pope Francis visited the Great Synagogue on 17 January 2016. During his visit, the pope denounced all violence committed in the name of God, and joined in the diaspora as a sign of interfaith friendship. Pope Francis repeated several times the words first spoken by Pope John Paul, saying that Jews were the "elder brothers" of Christians. Pope Francis added Christian "elder sisters" of the Jewish faith to his words.

=== 1982 attack ===
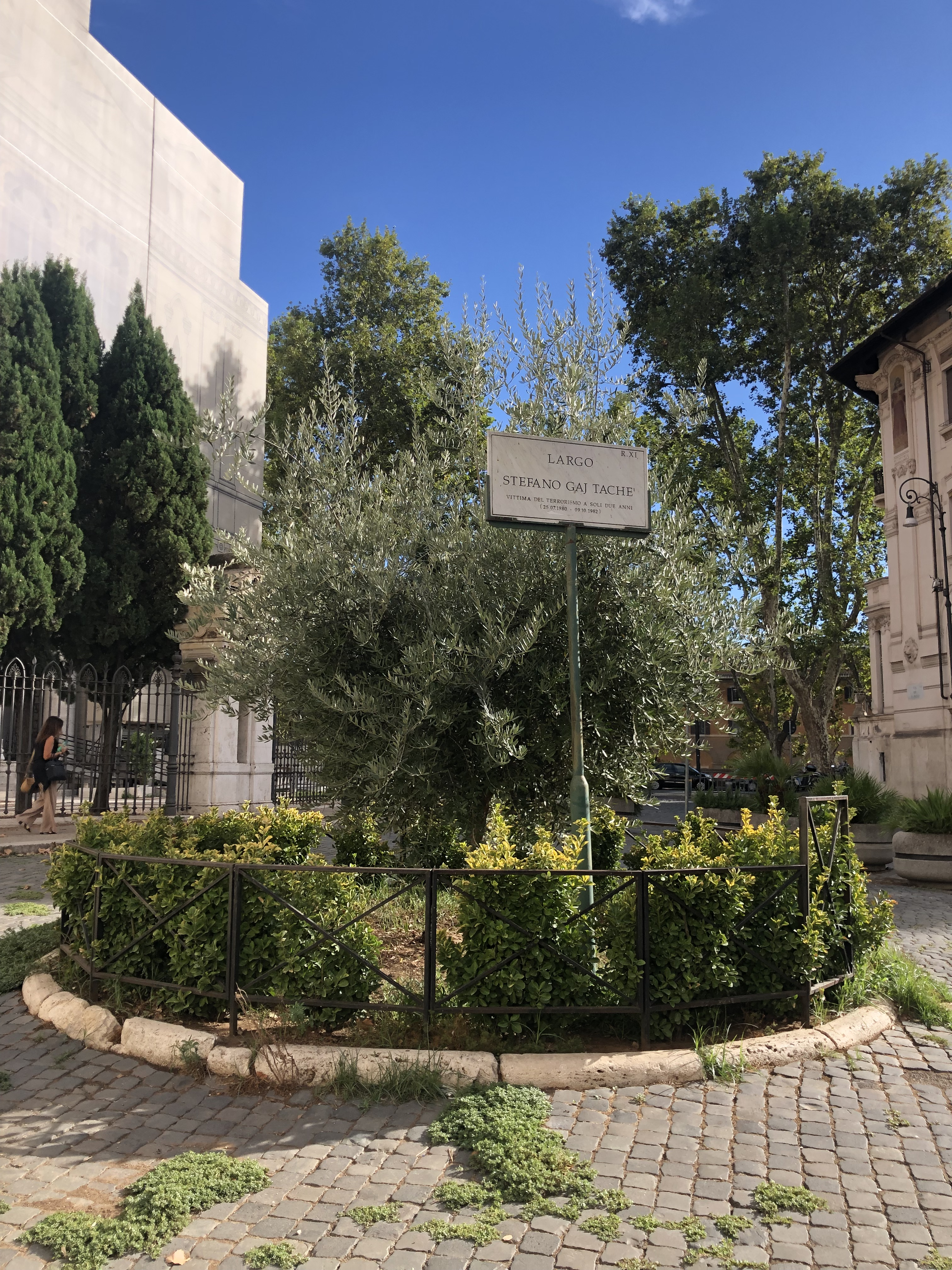
Tree planted in memory of Stefano Gaj Taché, the 2-year-old toddler killed in the attack. The commemorative plaque reads "Stefano Gaj Taché, victim of terrorism at only two years of age".

The synagogue was attacked on 9 October 1982 during a celebration of the holiday of Sukkot by five armed Palestinian terrorists at the close of the morning Shabbat service. One person, Stefano Gaj Taché, a two-year-old, was killed. The attack was likely carried out by the Abu Nidal Organization.

== Design ==
Designed by Vincenzo Costa and Osvaldo Armanni, the synagogue was built from 1901 to 1904 on the banks of the Tiber, overlooking the former ghetto. It contains elements of Assyrian-Babylonian, Egyptian and Greco-Roman architecture. The eclectic style of the building makes it stand out, even in a city known for notable buildings and structures. This attention-grabbing design was a deliberate choice made by the community at the time who wanted the building to be a visible celebration of their freedom and to be seen from many vantage points in the city. The aluminium dome is the only square dome in the city and makes the building easily identifiable, even from a distance. The interior of the synagogue is lavishly decorated in the Art Nouveau style.

== Gallery ==
=== Synagogue building ===
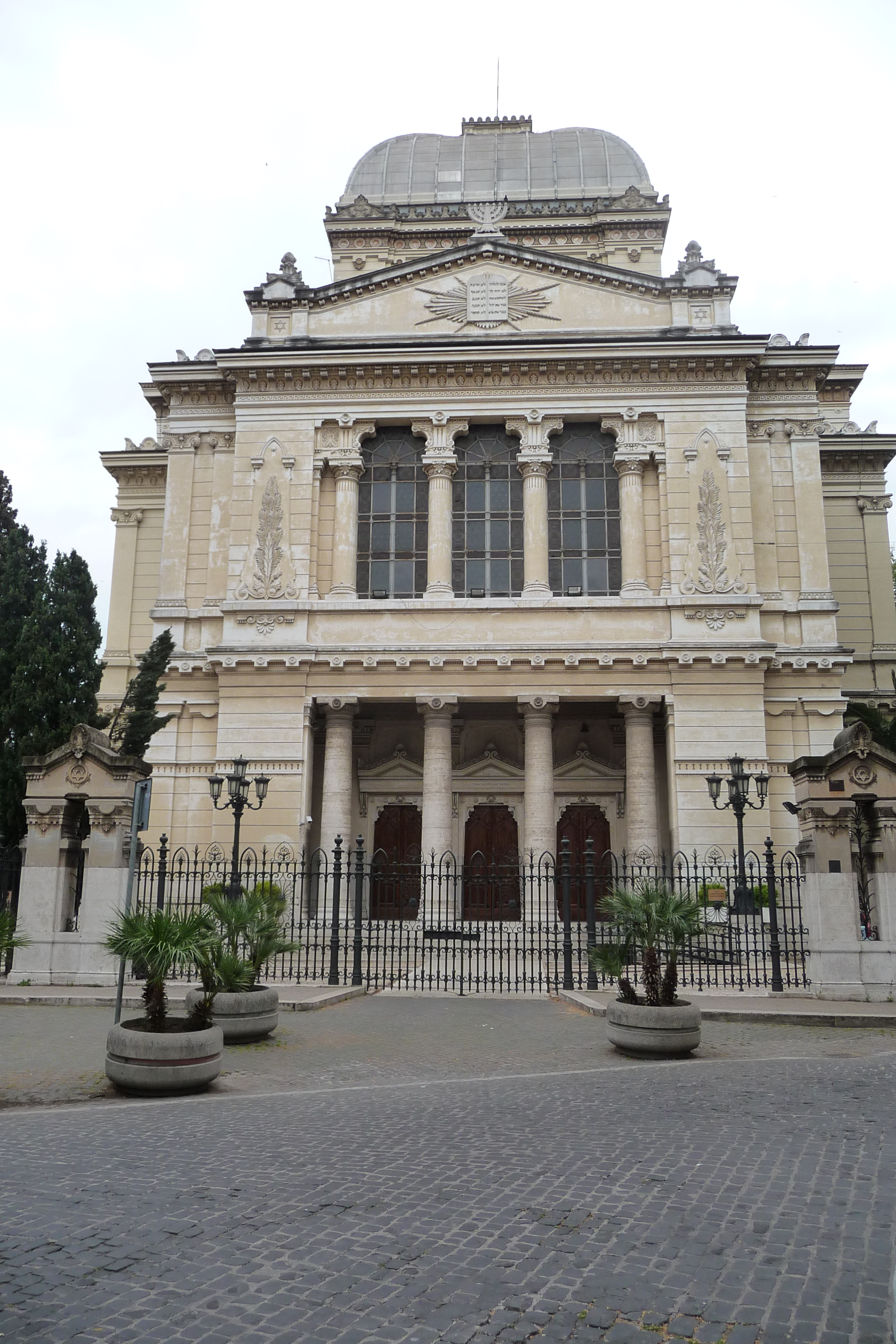
The principal façade of the Great Synagogue, with the main entrance.

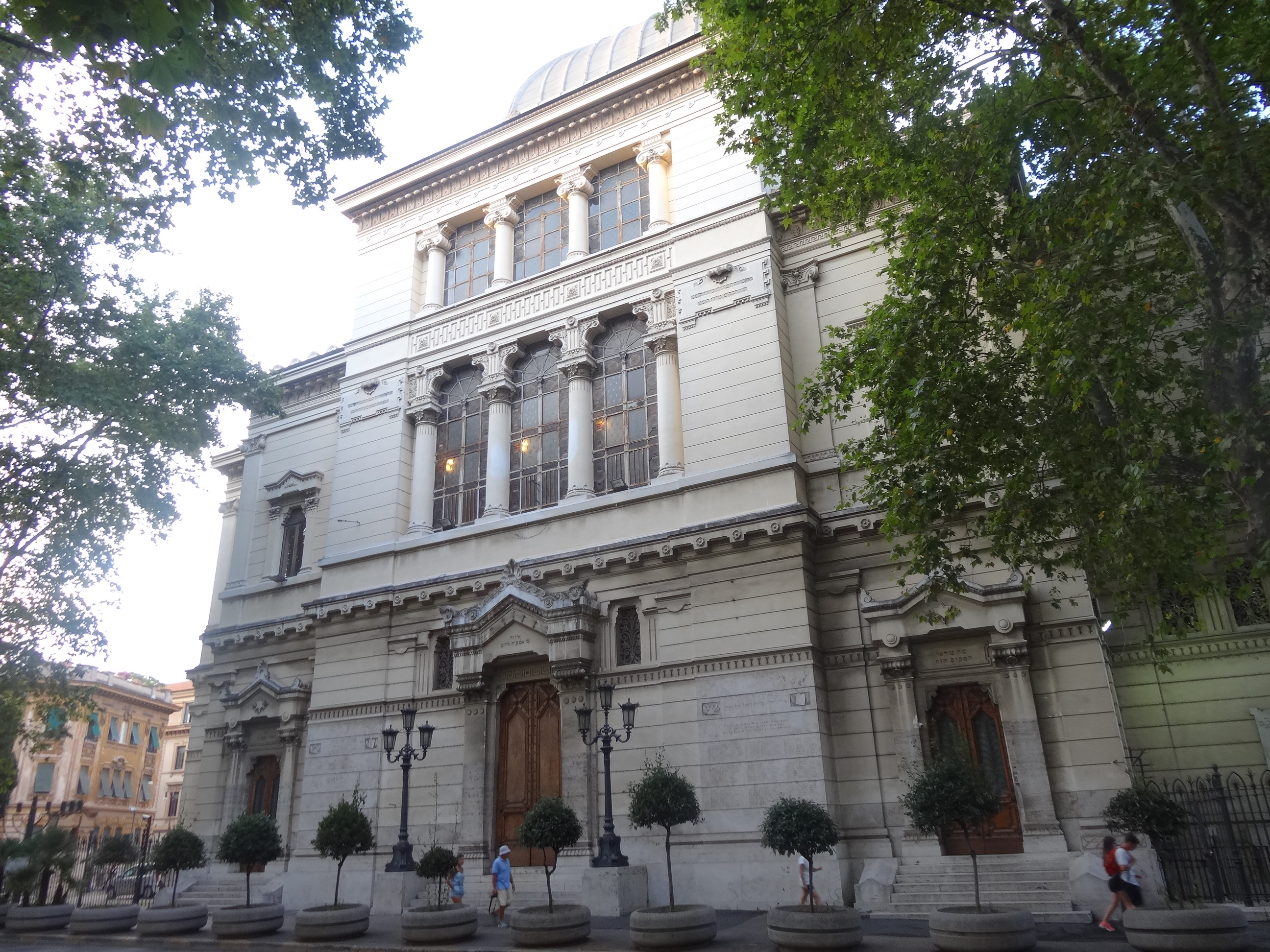
Side view of the building, seen from Lungotevere de' Cenci.

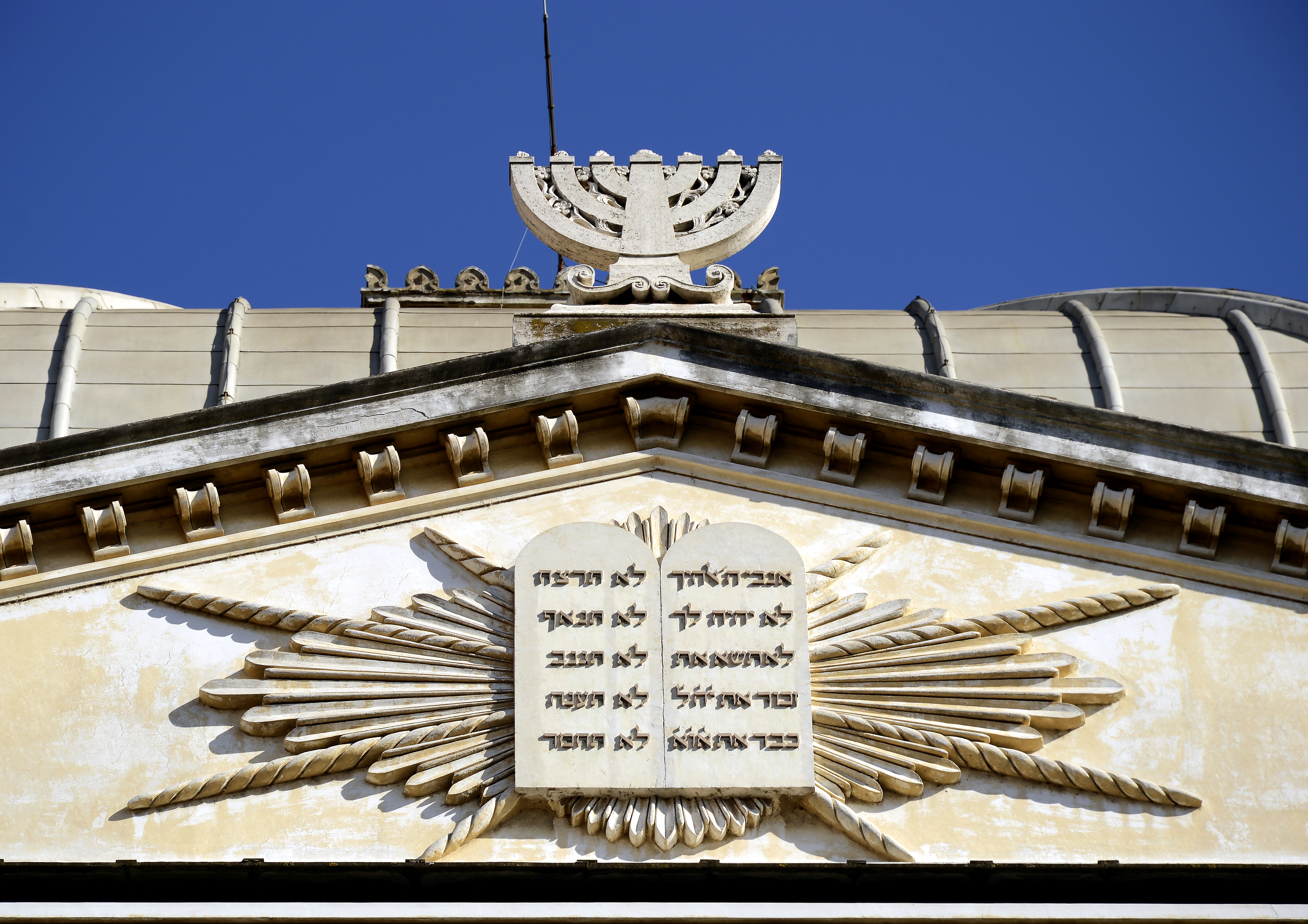
Detail of the façade with ornaments representing the Temple menorah and the Tablets of Stone.

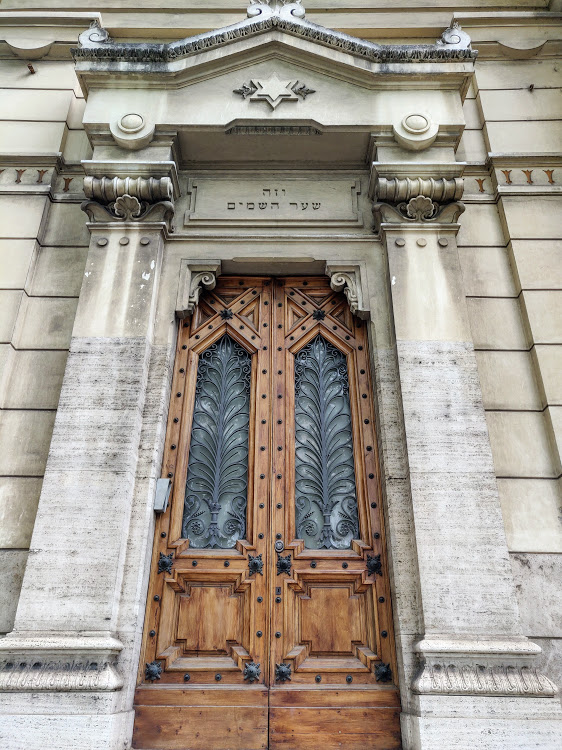
One of the decorated wooden doors of the Synagogue.

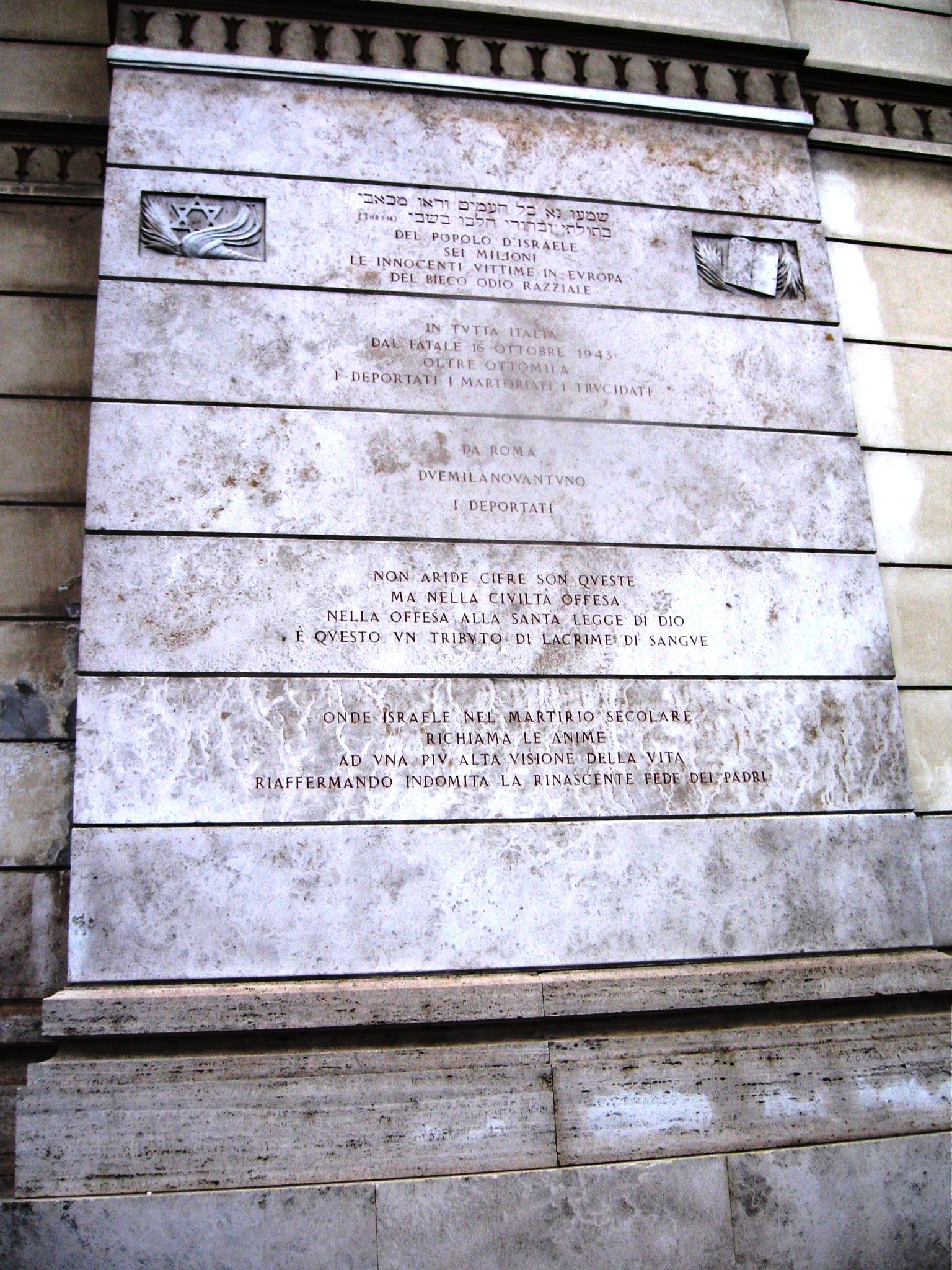
Inscription commemorating The Holocaust and the Raid on the Roman Ghetto.

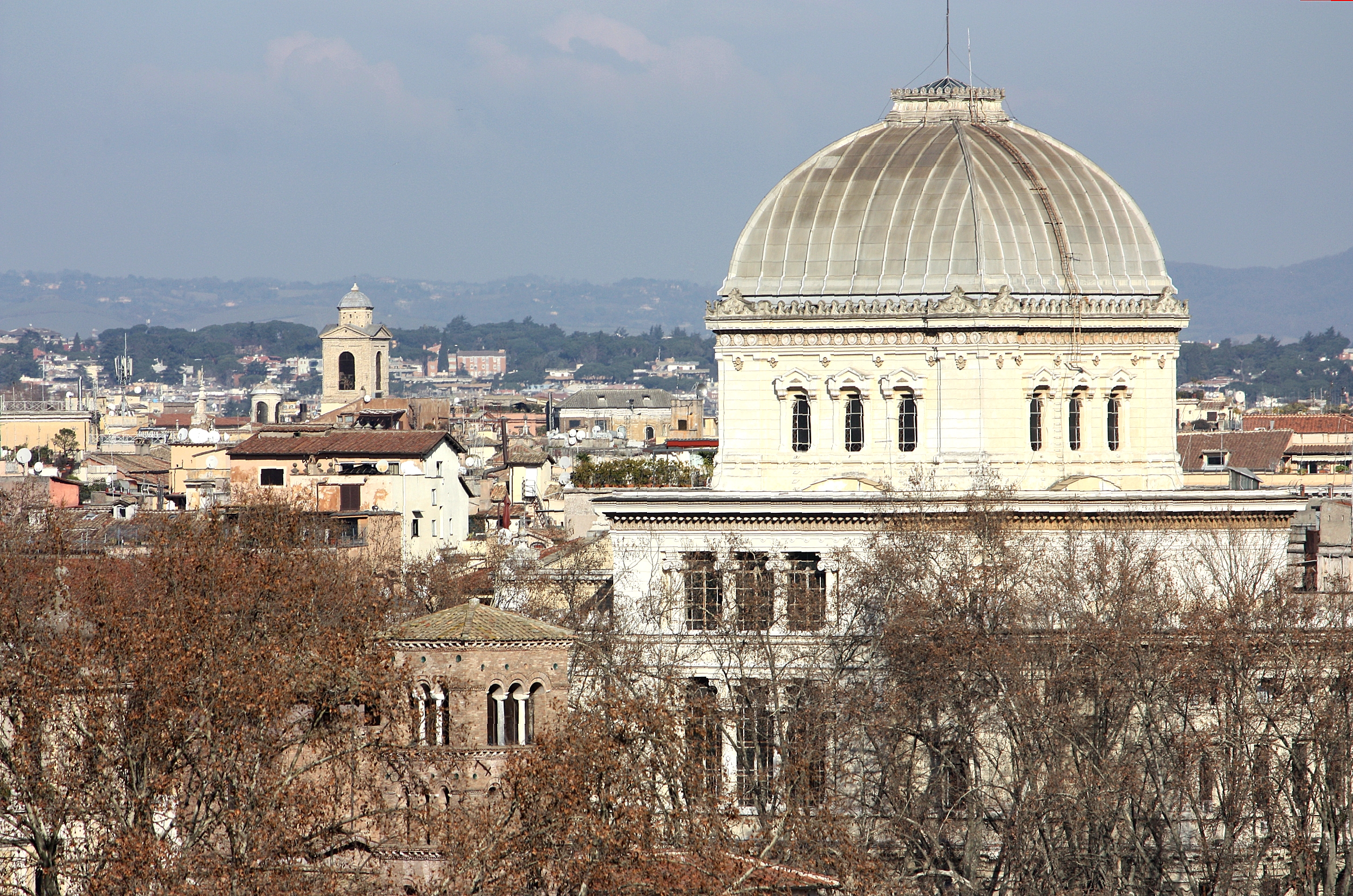
The square dome of the Great Synagogue emerging over Rome's skyline.

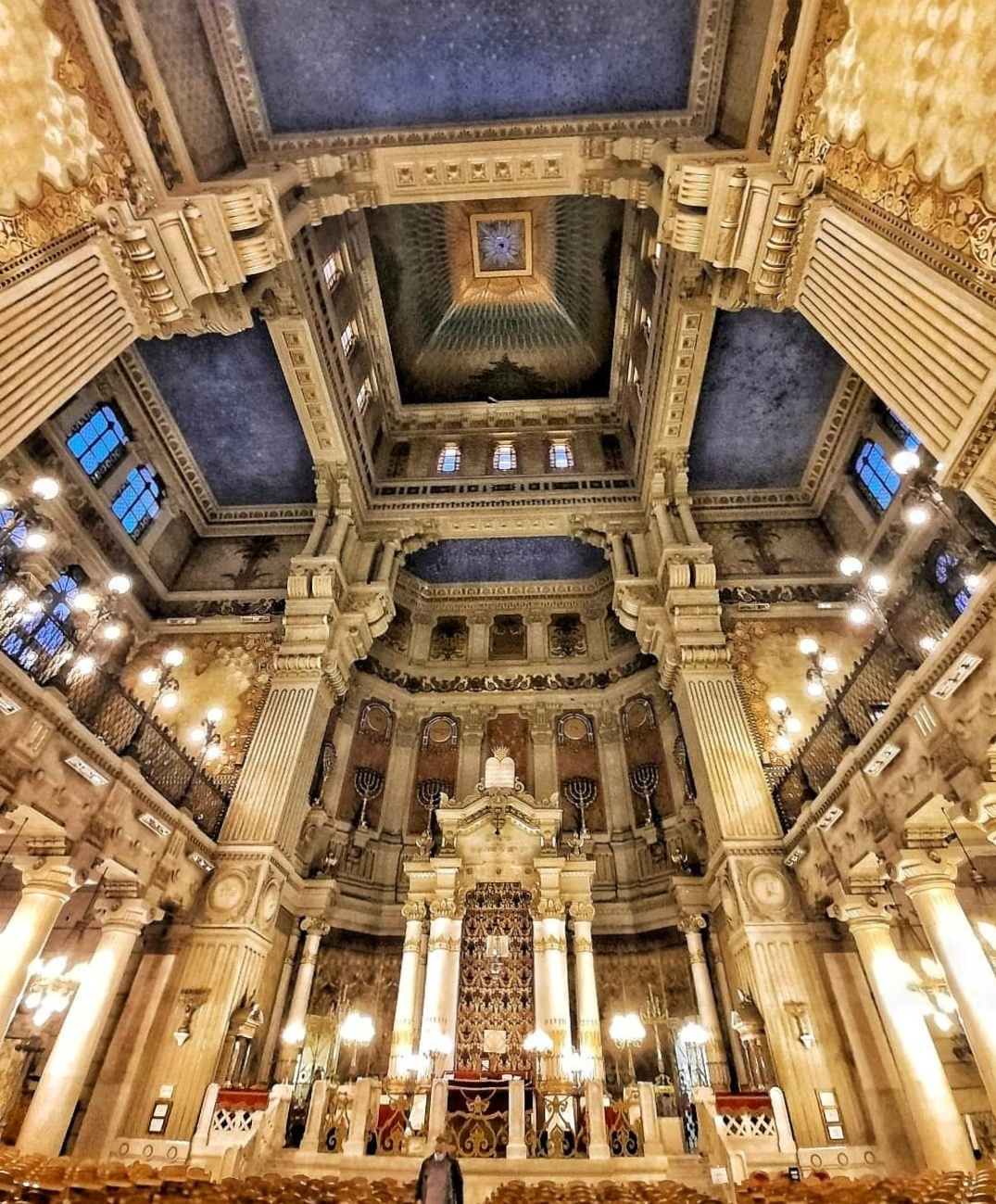
Interior of the Main synagogue (Italian: Tempio Maggiore)

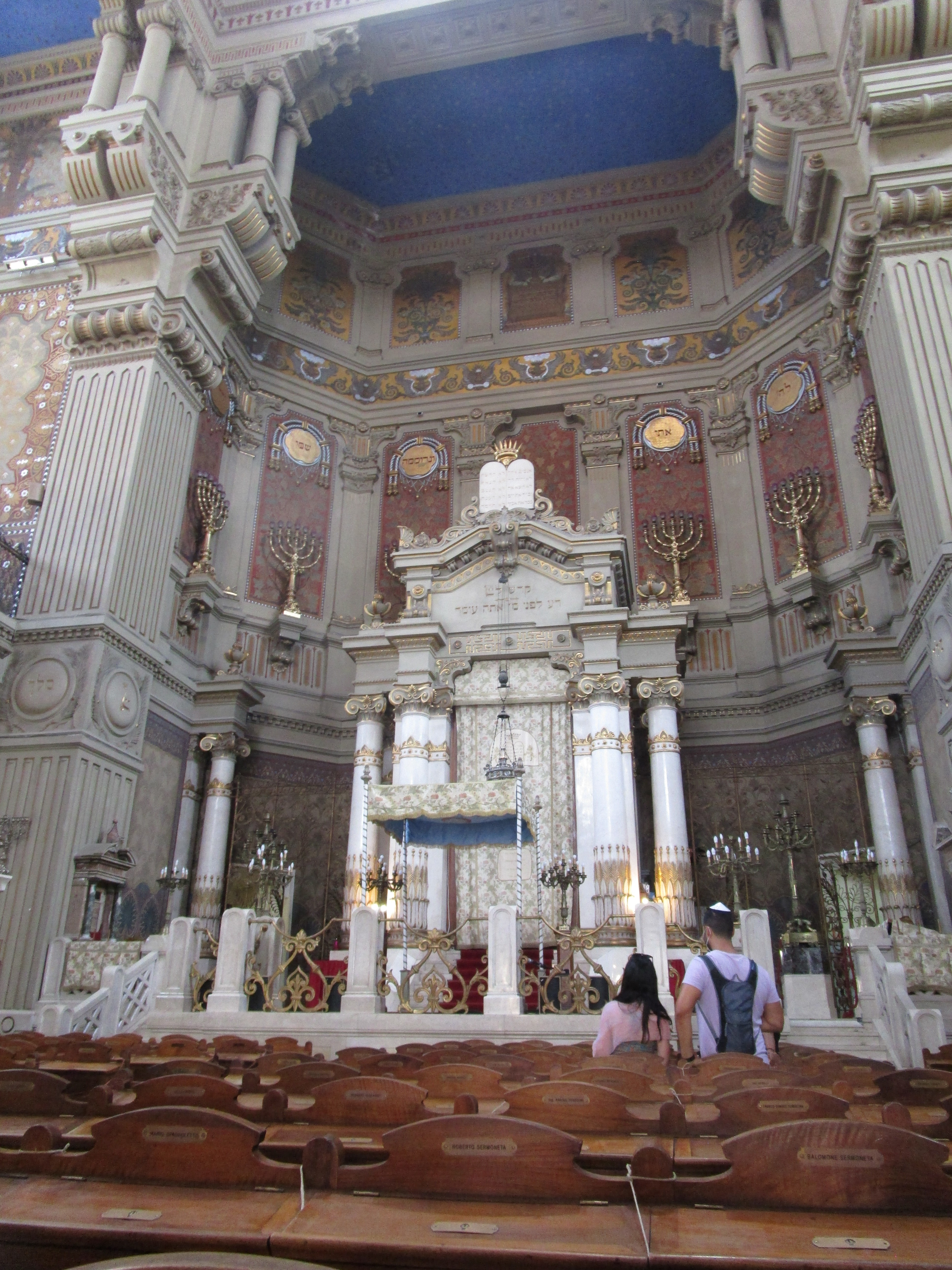
The Torah ark

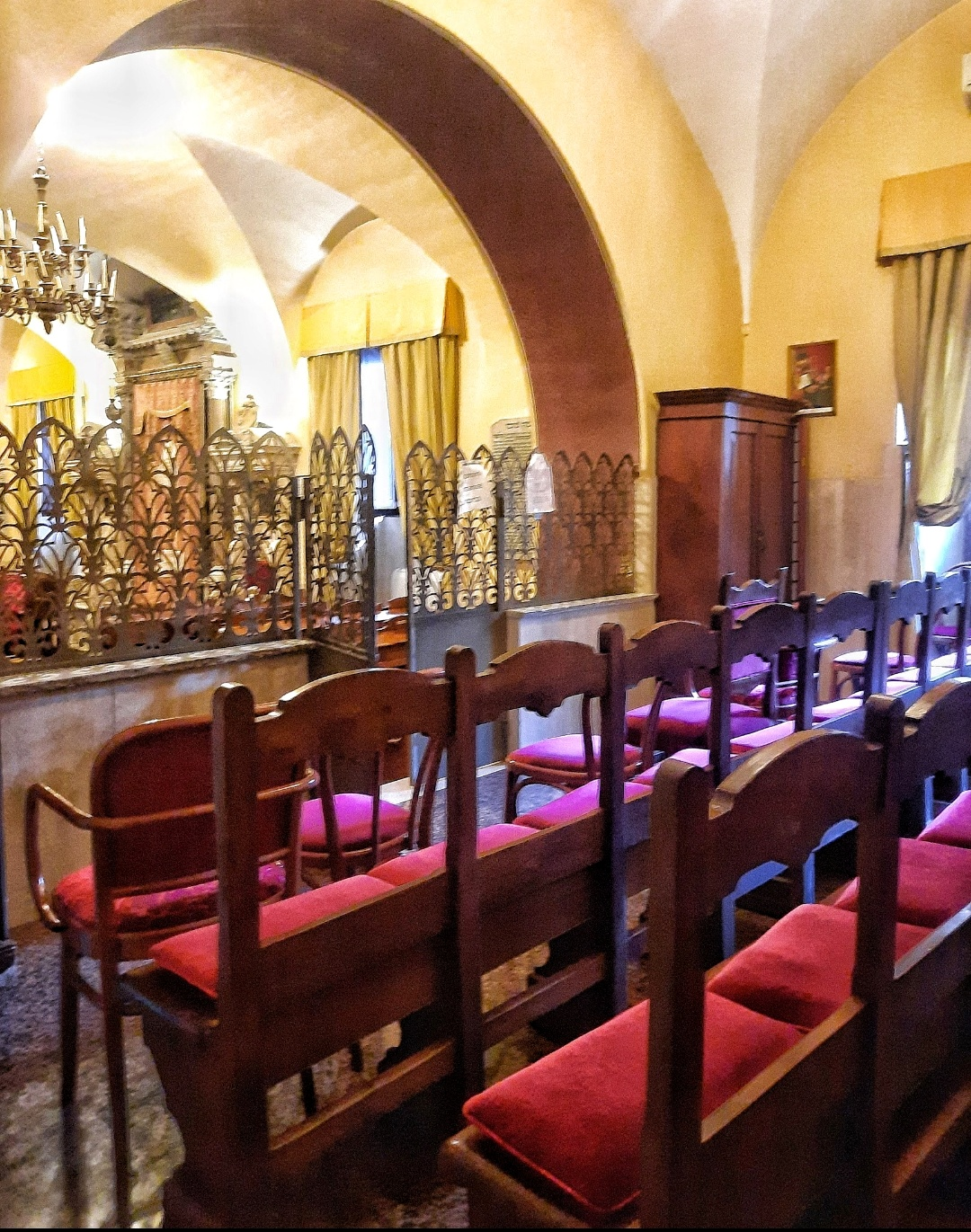
The Sephardi synagogue (Italian: Tempio Spagnolo)

=== Jewish museum ===
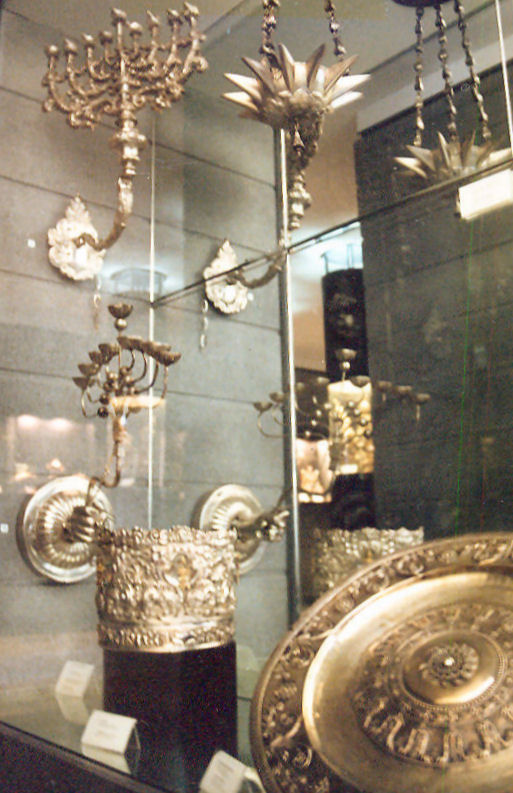
Silverware on display in the Jewish Museum of Rome

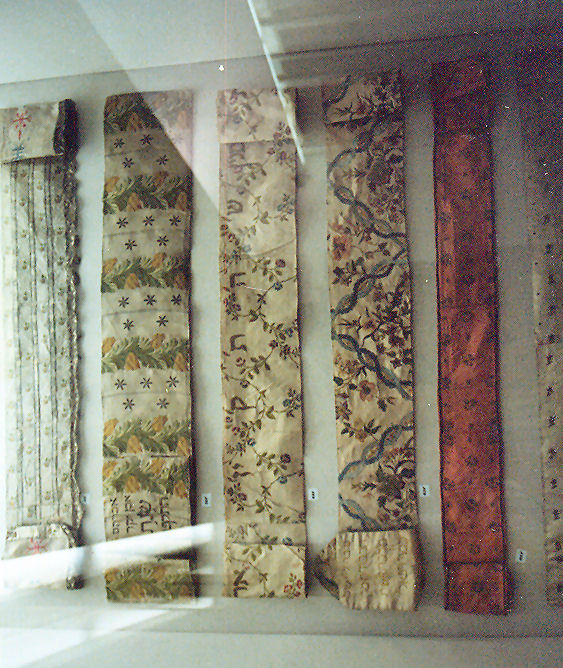
Inner ornamental embroidered covering of the Scroll of the Law.

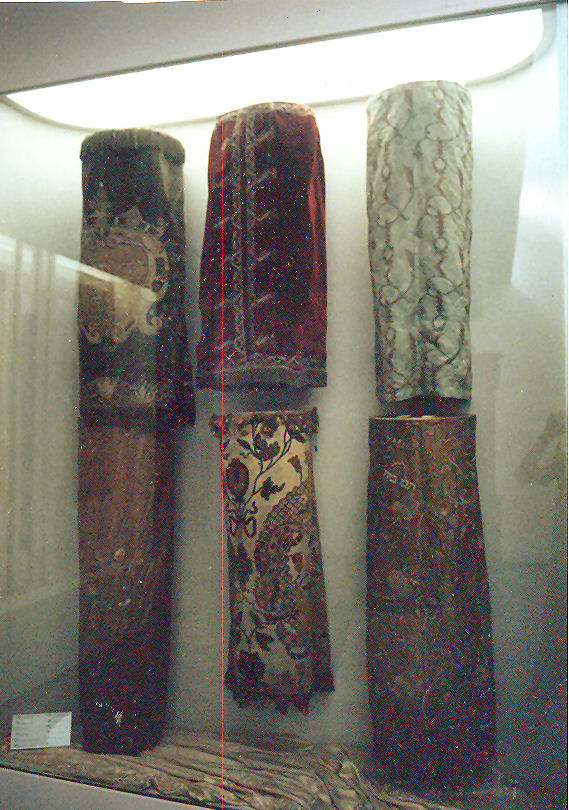
Ornamental velvet covering of the Scroll of the Law.

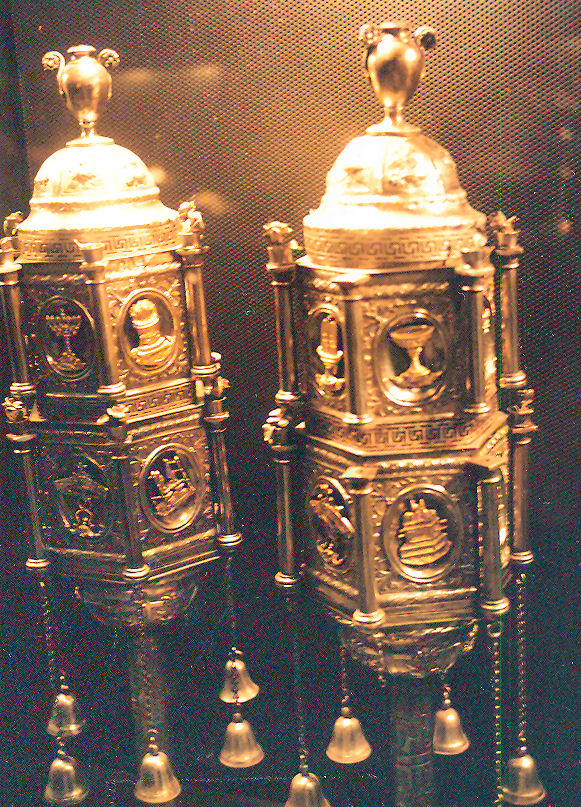
Rings on the Scroll of the Law.

== See also ==
- History of the Jews in Rome
- Jewish Museum of Rome
- List of synagogues in Italy
