= Antonio Poli =

Italian operatic tenor

Antonio Poli is an Italian operatic tenor. He debuted at The Royal Opera as Cassio in Otello in 2012, and also sung Don Ottavio in Don Giovanni in 2013.
