= Oscar Luigi Scalfaro =

President of Italy from 1992 to 1999

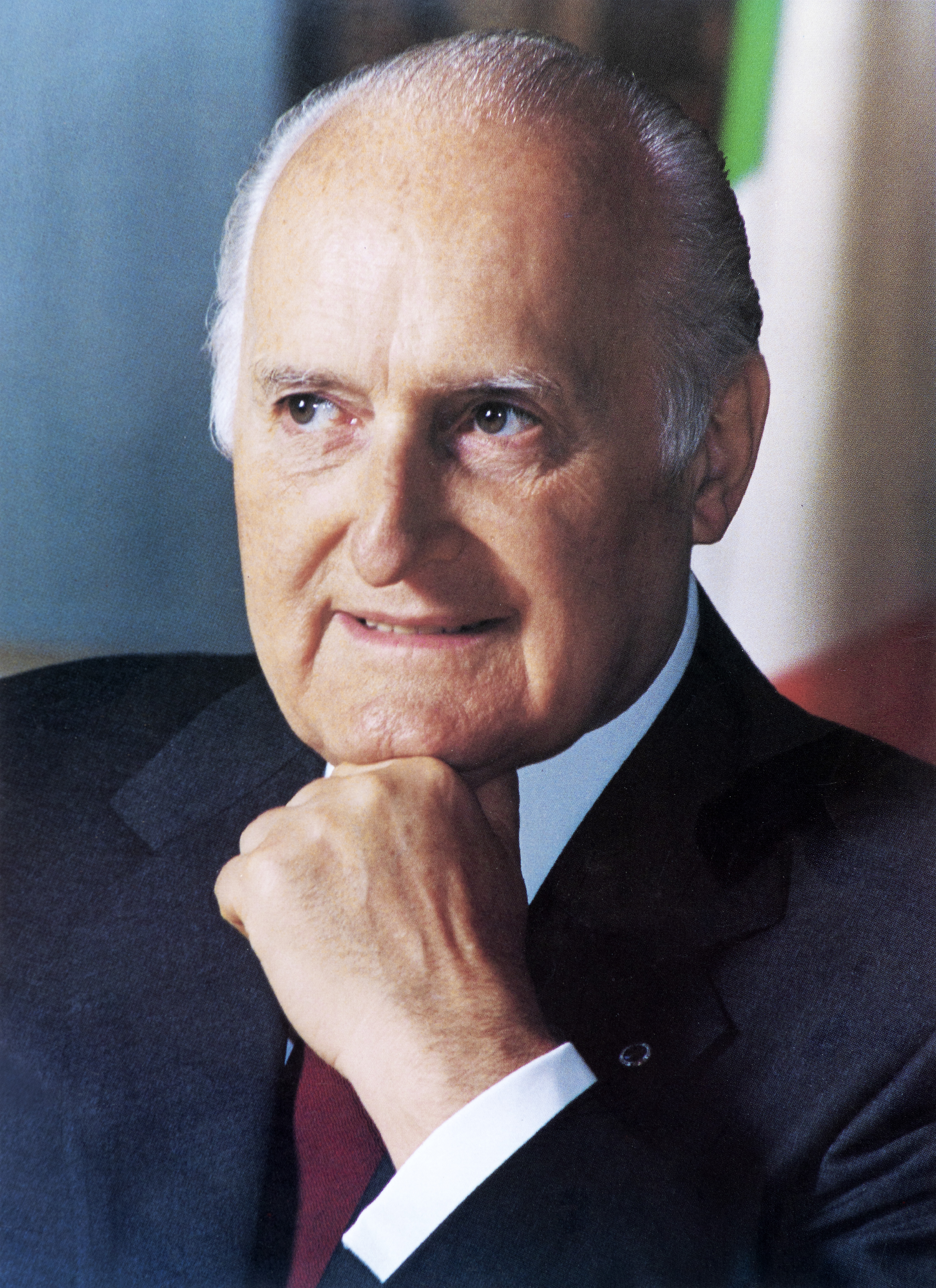
- Official portrait, 1992

President of Italy
- In office 28 May 1992 – 15 May 1999
- Prime Minister: Giulio Andreotti; Giuliano Amato; Carlo Azeglio Ciampi; Silvio Berlusconi; Lamberto Dini; Romano Prodi; Massimo D'Alema
- Preceded by: Francesco Cossiga
- Succeeded by: Carlo Azeglio Ciampi

President of the Chamber of Deputies
- In office 24 April 1992 – 25 May 1992
- Preceded by: Nilde Iotti
- Succeeded by: Giorgio Napolitano
Ministerial offices
Minister of the Interior
In office 4 August 1983 – 28 July 1987
Prime Minister	Bettino Craxi; Amintore Fanfani
Preceded by	Virginio Rognoni
Succeeded by	Amintore Fanfani
Minister of Public Education
In office 26 July 1972 – 7 July 1973
Prime Minister	Giulio Andreotti
Preceded by	Riccardo Misasi
Succeeded by	Franco Maria Malfatti
Minister of Transport and Civil Aviation
In office 12 February 1972 – 26 July 1972
Prime Minister	Giulio Andreotti
Preceded by	Italo Viglianesi
Succeeded by	Aldo Bozzi
In office 23 February 1966 – 12 December 1968
Prime Minister	Aldo Moro; Giovanni Leone
Preceded by	Angelo Raffaele Jervolino
Succeeded by	Luigi Mariotti
Secretary of the Council of Ministers
In office 10 February 1954 – 6 July 1955
Prime Minister	Mario Scelba
Preceded by	Mariano Rumor
Succeeded by	Carlo Russa
Parliamentary offices
Member of the Senate of the Republic
Ex officio
Life tenure 16 May 1999 – 29 January 2012
Member of the Chamber of Deputies
In office 8 May 1948 – 25 May 1992
Constituency	Turin–Novara–Vercelli
Member of the Constituent Assembly
In office 25 June 1946 – 31 January 1948
Constituency	Turin

Personal details
- Born: 9 September 1918 Novara, Piedmont, Kingdom of Italy
- Died: 29 January 2012 (aged 93) Rome, Lazio, Italy
- Party: DC (1946–1992); Independent (from 1992)
- Spouse: Maria Inzitari (m. 1943; died 1944)
- Children: 1
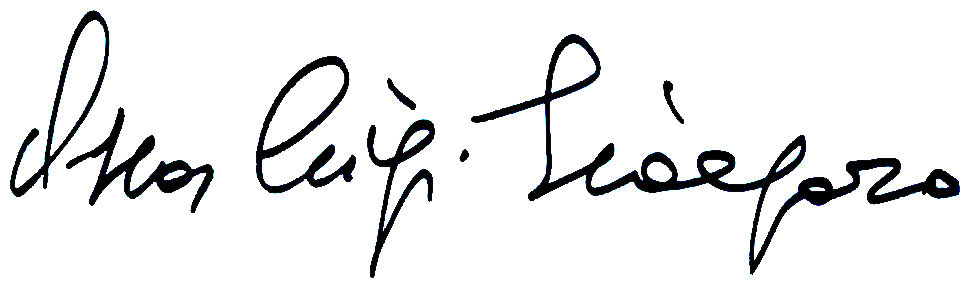
- Signature

Oscar Luigi Scalfaro (Italian: [ˈɔskar luˈiːdʒi ˈskalfaro]; 9 September 1918 – 29 January 2012) was an Italian politician who served as the president of Italy from 1992 to 1999. A member of Christian Democracy (DC), he became an independent politician after the DC's dissolution in 1992, and was close to the centre-left Democratic Party when it was founded in 2007. Before his election to the Presidency, he was a member of the Chamber of Deputies for Turin for 44 years from 1948 to 1992.

== Biography ==
Scalfaro was born in Novara, Province of Novara, on 9 September 1918, son of Guglielmo, Barone Scalfaro (born Naples, 21 December 1888) and wife Rosalia Ussino. He was raised in a religious atmosphere. He became a member of the association Azione Cattolica (Catholic Action) at the age of 12 and kept its badge on his lapel until his death.

Scalfaro studied law at Milan's Università Cattolica and graduated on 30 July 1941. On 21 October 1942, he entered the magistrature. In 1945, after the end of World War II, he became a public prosecuting attorney, and to date, he is the last Italian attorney to have obtained a death sentence: in July of that year, along with two others, he was a public prosecutor in the trial against former Novara prefect Enrico Vezzalini and servicemen Arturo Missiato, Domenico Ricci, Salvatore Santoro, Giovanni Zeno and Raffaele Infante, accused of "collaborating with the German invaders". After a three-day-long debate, all six were condemned to death. The death sentences were carried out on 23 September 1945. Later on, he obtained one more death sentence, but the accused was pardoned before the execution could take place. In 1946, he was elected to the Constituent Assembly and later in 1948, he became a deputy representing the district of Turin. He was re-elected ten times in a row until 1992. Within the Democrazia Cristiana party, he was associated with its right wing.

On 25 May 1992, he was elected as President of the Italian Republic, after a two-week stalemate of unsuccessful attempts to reach agreement. The killing of anti-Mafia magistrate Giovanni Falcone prompted his election. His mandate ended in May 1999, and he automatically became a lifetime member of the Senate.

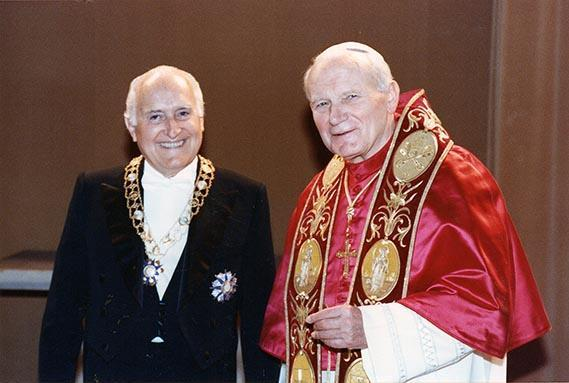
Church and state: President Scalfaro with Pope John Paul II in November 1992

On 7 April 1994, Scalfaro co-officiated at the Papal Concert to Commemorate the Shoah at the Sala Nervi in Vatican City, along with Pope John Paul II, and Chief Rabbi of Rome Elio Toaff.

In recent times, Scalfaro was the chairman of the committee that advocated the abrogation, in the referendum of 25 and 26 June 2006, on the constitutional reform that had been passed in parliament the previous year by the former centre-right majority. Along with all the centre-left (and a few centre-right personalities, too), Scalfaro considered it to be dangerous for national unity and for other reasons. The opponents of the reform won a landslide victory in the referendum.

Scalfaro was the oldest surviving former Italian president and the second-oldest member of the Senate, after Rita Levi-Montalcini. He consequently took the temporary presidency of the newly elected assembly which followed the 2006 general election, as Levi Montalcini refused the role because of her age. This made him one of the three politicians in Italian history to have presided over the three highest-ranked offices in the Italian Republic: President of the Republic, President of the Senate, and President of the Chamber of Deputies; the others are Sandro Pertini and Enrico De Nicola.

A staunch Catholic, and in the past, a rather conservative and anti-communist politician, Scalfaro nevertheless distrusted many members of the DC who changed support to Forza Italia, and was consistently on bad terms with Silvio Berlusconi. He openly supported the centre-left coalition, which included Democratic Party of the Left, which won the 1996 and 2006 elections. After the 2008 parliamentary election, he was again asked to preside as pro tempore Speaker of the Senate after Rita Levi-Montalcini again refused the post, but this time he also declined to serve.

During the Second World War, in 1944, Scalfaro lost his 20-year-old wife Maria Inzitari, by whom he had a daughter, Marianna. He never married again.

Scalfaro died on 29 January 2012 in Rome.

== Honours and awards ==
As President of the Italian Republic, Scalfaro was Head of several Italian Orders from 28 May 1992 to 15 May 1999: the Order of Merit of the Italian Republic, the Military Order of Italy, the Order of the Star of Italian Solidarity, the Order of Merit for Labour and the Order of Vittorio Veneto. Personally, he was awarded the Gold Medal of Merit for School, Culture and Art on 31 July 1973.

Oscar Luigi Scalfaro coat of arms as a knight of the Swedish Order of the Seraphim

He also received several foreign honours:

- Knight of Magistral Grace of the Sovereign Military Order of Malta (1950)
- Bailiff Grand Cross of Honour and Devotion of the Sovereign Military Order of Malta
- Denmark : Knight of the Order of the Elephant (19 October 1993)
- Malta : Honorary Companion of Honour with Collar of the National Order of Merit (16 November 1995)
- Spain : Knight of the Collar of the Order of Isabella the Catholic (27 June 1996)
- Slovakia : Grand Cross (or 1st Class) of the Order of the White Double Cross (1997)
- Croatia : Grand Cross of the Grand Order of King Tomislav (17 December 1997)
- Estonia : Collar of the Order of the Cross of Terra Mariana
- Latvia : Commander Grand Cross (or 1st Class) of the Order of the Three Stars
- Lithuania : Grand Cross of the Order of Vytautas the Great (19 May 1997)
- Sweden : Knight of the Order of the Seraphim (30 April 1998)
- Poland : Knight of the Order of the White Eagle
- Uruguay : Medal of the Oriental Republic of Uruguay (1995)

== Electoral history ==
Election	House	Constituency	Party	Votes	Result
1946	Constituent Assembly	Turin–Novara–Vercelli	DC	43,218	Elected
1948	Chamber of Deputies	Turin–Novara–Vercelli	DC	55,499	Elected
1953	Chamber of Deputies	Turin–Novara–Vercelli	DC	44,705	Elected
1958	Chamber of Deputies	Turin–Novara–Vercelli	DC	36,060	Elected
1963	Chamber of Deputies	Turin–Novara–Vercelli	DC	56,987	Elected
1968	Chamber of Deputies	Turin–Novara–Vercelli	DC	92,979	Elected
1972	Chamber of Deputies	Turin–Novara–Vercelli	DC	114,187	Elected
1976	Chamber of Deputies	Turin–Novara–Vercelli	DC	87,459	Elected
1979	Chamber of Deputies	Turin–Novara–Vercelli	DC	56,815	Elected
1983	Chamber of Deputies	Turin–Novara–Vercelli	DC	44,325	Elected
1987	Chamber of Deputies	Turin–Novara–Vercelli	DC	91,722	Elected
1992	Chamber of Deputies	Turin–Novara–Vercelli	DC	35,630	Elected

Political offices
Preceded by Mariano Rumor	Secretary of the Council of Ministers; 1954–1955	Succeeded by Carlo Russo
Preceded by Angelo Raffaele Jervolino	Minister of Transports and Civil Aviation; 1966–1968	Succeeded by Luigi Mariotti
Preceded by Italo Viglianesi	Minister of Transports and Civil Aviation; 1972	Succeeded by Aldo Bozzi
Preceded by Riccardo Misasi	Minister of Public Education; 1972–1973	Succeeded by Franco Maria Malfatti
Preceded by Virginio Rognoni	Minister of the Interior; 1983–1987	Succeeded by Amintore Fanfani
Preceded by Nilde Iotti	President of the Chamber of Deputies; 1992	Succeeded by Giorgio Napolitano
Preceded by Francesco Cossiga	President of Italy; 1992–1999	Succeeded by Carlo Azeglio Ciampi
