= Elio Toaff =

Italian rabbi (1915–2015)

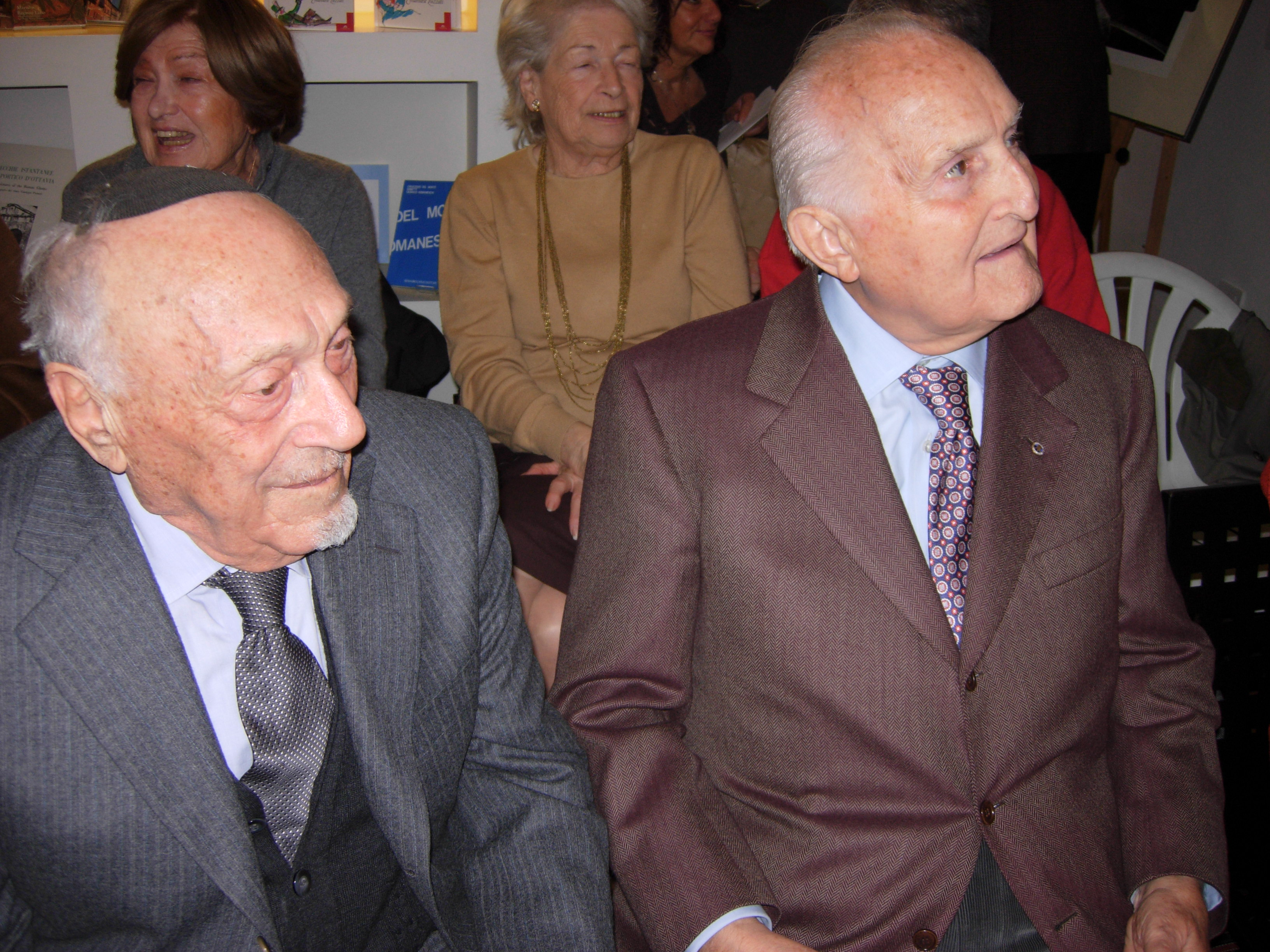
Elio Toaff (on left) with former Italian president Oscar Luigi Scalfaro in 2007

Elio Toaff (30 April 1915 – 19 April 2015) was the Chief Rabbi of Rome from 1951 to 2002. He served as a rabbi in Venice from 1947, and in 1951 became the Chief Rabbi of Rome.

== Early life ==
Toaff was born in Livorno in 1915, the son of the city's rabbi Alfredo Sabato Toaff and his wife Alice Yarch. one of four children, the others being Cesare, Renzo and Pia, He then undertook, under his father's guidance, his early religious formation at Livorno's Rabbinical College, while attending the University of Pisa where he studied law. He had difficulties finding a supervisor for his final thesis. By that time, the Fascist government had passed its antisemitic Italian Racial Laws, which blocked Jews from registering to study for, though not from completing, a tertiary degree. Only one professor, Lorenzo Mossa, finally offered to step in, and assigned him to work on the legal conflict between Ottoman, Jewish and English law in Mandatory Palestine. He managed to graduate by 1938, despite the fact that the head of the commission, Cesarini Sforza, before whom he was to discuss his thesis, abandoned the proceedings in disgust at the presence of a Jew. In 1939 he completed his theological degree. His brother Renzo, a surgeon, was literally ordered out of the hospital where he was employed while conducting an operation but refused to do so until he had completed it. Despite his father's reservations, given the dangers of the time and the idea one rabbi sufficed for the family, he was ordained rabbi the following year. Shortly afterwards he was appointed chief rabbi of the community of Ancona, a position he maintained until 1943. In one of his first acts, on his arrival, he managed to persuade a local Jewish family not to convert to Christianity: he argued that such a move was 'cowardly, useless and undignified' in the circumstances.

== Wartime ==
On one occasion, when Toaff was driven out of the Ancona hospital while tendering religious consolation to a Jewish patient, he sought out the local head of the carabinieri who immediately provided him with an escort of four gendarmes that enabled him to return to the patient's bedside. The marshal in question assured Toaff that he could call on him for help if any other problems arose.

In the wake of Pietro Badoglio's declaration of a cessation of hostilities with the Allies on 8 September 1943, Toaff and his family were forced to go into hiding, as Germany invaded Italy. He shut the synagogue when German troops arrived, an event coinciding with Yom Kippur that year, and, with the help of the Anconians, hid the members of the community in local houses and in parish churches. The adolescents and children were put on a boat sailing south to the area under the control of the Allies. The Nazis and their remaining fascist allies in Italy reacted to the armistice by organizing the first deportations for concentration camps and Arbeitslager. Toaff had been tipped off by the local parish priest that an attempt would be made to assassinate him, and he, together with his father, his wife Lia Luperini and their son Ariel Toaff, managed to take refuge in Versilia, thanks to the hospitality of the parish priest, don Francalanci. Toaff did not have the option of fleeing Italy, mindful of his father's words that: 'A rabbi does not have the same freedom of choice others have; he can never abandon his community.' He recalled later every Jew in Ancona survived the war thanks to the assistance given by their Catholic neighbours. Toaff was captured by the SS during a raid, and was saved from being executed as others had been who were caught in the roundup, when the Austrian, with whom he had conversed a little in French, and who was in charge of the execution, gave the order to release him as he was digging his own grave. Catholic families helped them throughout their flight, which led them to a refuge also in Città di Castello where, in 1999, he was accorded their honorary citizenship. Toaff himself joined the Italian Resistance in the mountains of central Italy, working also to secure the safety of fellow Jews. His company was the first to enter the village after the SS executed the Sant'Anna di Stazzema massacre, in which 560 villagers were murdered. He recalled coming across a woman who appeared to be asleep but, on closer inspection, had been disembowelled, with her fetus nearby, ripped from the womb, and shot through the head.

From his experiences, Toaff stated that Italians were not anti-Semitic, that the survival of the Jews during the war was due to the assistance other Italians provided them during that period, and that Jews were perfectly integrated into their respective communities.

== Postwar period ==
At the conclusion of the hostilities of World War II, Toaff was appointed chief rabbi of Venice, a position he held until 1951 when he assumed the same role for the Jewish community of Rome. While in Venice he also lectured on Hebrew language and literature at the Ca' Foscari University of Venice. He published his autobiography, Perfidi giudei, fratelli maggiori (Perfidious Jews, Elder Brothers) in 1987.

Toaff resigned as chief rabbi at the age of 86 on 8 October 2001 and was succeeded by Riccardo Di Segni. On the eve of his retirement, Toaff said:

'A rabbi doesn't work only for his community or for the Jews. A rabbi has to talk to every human being who needs him. He belongs to everybody. He is for everybody.'

On 17 May 2012, he was awarded the Prize Culturae within the Italian National Festival of Cultures in Pisa.

Toaff died on 19 April 2015, 11 days before his 100th birthday.

Pope Francis sent a telegram to Dr. Riccardo Di Segni, Toaff's successor as Chief Rabbi of Rome:

To Dr. Riccardo Di Segni, Chief Rabbi of the Jewish Community of Rome:

I would like to express my heartfelt participation in mourning, together with his family, and the entire Jewish community here in the capital of Rome, for the demise of the former longtime Chief Rabbi of Rome, Professor Dr. Elio Toaff, long the distinguished spiritual leader of the Jews of Rome.

The protagonist of Italian civil and Jewish history in recent decades, he knew how to overcome divisions, and both of our communities had a common esteem and appreciation for his moral authority, together with a deep humanity.

I remember with gratitude his generous commitment and sincere willingness to promote dialogue and fraternal relations between Jews and Catholics; during his tenure our communities saw a significant moment in this regard, in his memorable encounter with my esteemed predecessor Saint Pope John Paul II, at the Chief Synagogue of Rome.

I raise prayers to the most high God the Father, full of love and fidelity, to welcome him into his Kingdom of peace.

From the Vatican, 20 April 2015,

Franciscus.

Toaff and his wife had four children: three sons, one being Ariel, and a daughter, who married Sergio Della Pergola and lives in Israel.

== Jewish-Catholic relations ==
Upon the death of Pope Pius XII in 1958, Toaff, as Chief Rabbi of Rome, paid tribute to the late pontiff, saying: "Jews will always remember what the Catholic Church did for them by order of the pope during the Second World War. When the war was raging, Pius spoke out very often to condemn the false race theory," a sentiment echoed widely in the Jewish communities at that time, though later challenged by Rolf Hochhuth. There had been nonetheless contact with Pius XII and the local community, a situation that changed with Pope John XXIII who on one occasion stopped his car outside of the synagogue to bless the Jewish worshippers as they left, a gesture, the first papal blessing in 2,000 years, which moved them profoundly. No formal contacts, however, arose during the papacy of Pope Paul VI.

On 13 April 1986, Toaff was greeted by, and prayed with, Pope John Paul II during a visit to the Great Synagogue of Rome, the first by a reigning pope to a Jewish house of worship. Rather than extending his hand for a formal handshake, Toaff embraced the Pope. On 7 April 1994, Toaff co-officiated at the Papal Concert to Commemorate the Shoah at the Sala Nervi in Vatican City, along with Pope John Paul II, and the President of Italy Oscar Luigi Scalfaro.

Rabbi Toaff remained friends with John Paul until the pontiff's death and attended his funeral. He was one of the two people who the pope mentioned in his last will and testament, in which he stated: "How can I fail to remember the rabbi of Rome, and the numerous representatives of non-Christian religions?" The only other living person to be named was John Paul's longtime personal secretary, Archbishop Stanislaw Dziwisz.

== Bibliography ==
- Perfidi giudei, fratelli maggiori, 1987
- Essere ebreo with Alain Elkann, 1994
