= Riccardo Di Segni =

Chief rabbi of Rome (born 1949)

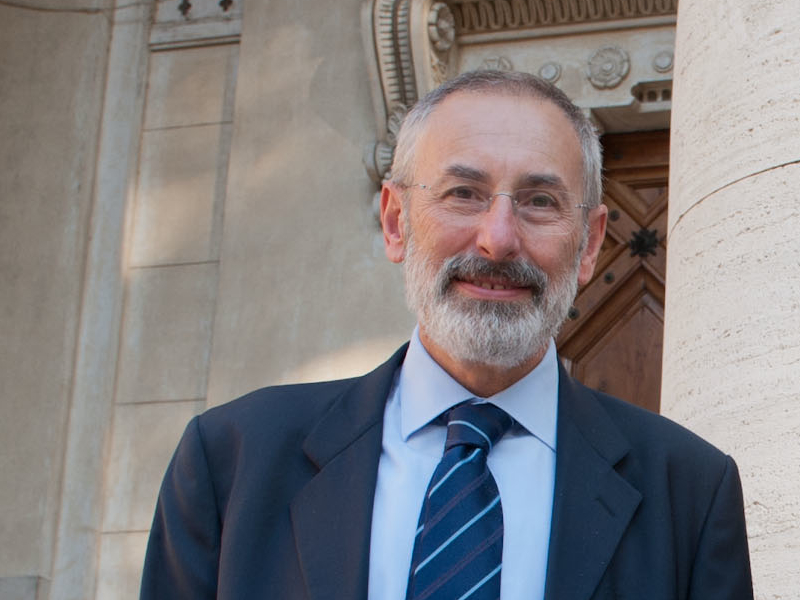
Riccardo Di Segni, 2011

Riccardo Di Segni (born November 13, 1949) is the chief rabbi of Rome.

A specialist in diagnostic radiology, he is descended from three generations of rabbis. He completed his rabbinical studies in 1973 and was elected chief rabbi of Rome in 2001.

In 2005, Di Segni was present at the funeral of John Paul II, with whom he had cordial relations. He has expressed concern over the state of Christian–Jewish dialogue during the papacy of Benedict XVI, at a time shortly after the Italian Rabbinical Assembly decided to temporarily suspend interfaith talks.

== Works ==
- 1976: Guida alle regole alimentari ebraiche
- 1981: Le unghie di Adamo
- 1985: Il Vangelo del Ghetto
- 1990: Catalogue of the Manuscripts of the Library of the Collegio Rabbinico Italiano (in English)
- 1998: Noten ta'am leshevach, ta'ame hakashrut baparshanut hayehudit (in Hebrew)
