= Ancient Christianities: The First Five Hundred Years =

2024 book by Paula Fredriksen

- cover
- Author: Paula Fredriksen
- Language: English
- Subject: Origins of Christianity within Second Temple Judaism and Jewish-Christian relations; theological diversity and the development of heresy; persecution, martyrdom, and the cult of saints; the development of Christian eschatology; the relationship between Christology and imperial power; Christian approaches to the body and ascetic practices; and the formation of Christian identity in contrast to "pagan" culture, including popular religious practices.
- Genre: Non-fiction
- Publisher: Princeton University Press
- Publication date: October 15, 2024
- Pages: 288
- ISBN: 9780691157696
- Website: site

Ancient Christianities: The First Five Hundred Years is a 2024 book by Paula Fredriksen that traces the origins and development of Christianity from its roots within Second Temple Judaism through its establishment as the dominant religion of the Roman Mediterranean world.

Organized into seven thematic chapters, each covering the full chronological span of the first five centuries of the Common Era, the book examines multiple topics, including the transformation of the concept of Israel, the emergence and suppression of theological diversity, Christian eschatology, persecution and martyrdom, the entanglement of doctrine with imperial power, ascetic attitudes toward the body, and the construction of a distinct Christian identity in relation to so-called pagan culture. A recurring theme is Fredriksen's treatment of labels such as 'Jewish,' 'Christian,' and 'pagan' not as fixed identities but as shifting rhetorical constructs. The book also develops the concept of a 'second Church' of everyday popular religion, including amulets, feasting, and rituals surrounding the dead, existing alongside the institutional church of clergy and doctrine.

Fredriksen's central argument is that Christianity's eventual dominance was not the product of inherent religious superiority, but rather the convergence of Roman civic religion's insistence on collective worship with a Jewish apocalyptic commitment to the exclusive veneration of a single universal God.

The book was broadly welcomed by reviewers as an accessible introduction suitable for undergraduate and graduate teaching. It has been described as a reworking of Henry Chadwick's The Early Church, a standard university textbook that Fredriksen considered outdated.

== Summary ==
The book consists of seven thematic chapters. Each is organized roughly chronologically within its topic, but covering the full span of the first five centuries of the Common Era, from the eras of Jesus and Paul to the emergence of Nicene Christianity as the orthodox form of the new faith. Each chapter opens with a brief abstract summarizing its main points.

Chapter 1, "The Idea of Israel," examines how the Christian movement originated within Second Temple Judaism and how the relationship between Jews and the emerging Christian communities evolved over five centuries. The author traces how the gospel message, as it spread through the Greco-Roman world, gradually distanced the majority of Jesus's followers from the Jewish context in which the movement began. She argues that the understanding of "Israel" was so transformed over the period that the Constantinian church eventually claimed the title for itself. The chapter also addresses the development of Christian anti-Judaism, stretching from intra-Jewish debates through to the ambiguous status of Jews within the Christianized Roman Empire.

Chapter 2, "The Dilemmas of Diversity," addresses the process by which variation in Christian thought and practice came to be labeled "heresy". Fredriksen surveys the second and third centuries as among the most theologically experimental in Christian history, exploring how neo-Platonic conceptions of God and materiality shaped disagreements. She suggests that the hardening of boundaries around orthodoxy was partly due to the influence of classical argumentative rhetoric, in which most major figures were trained. The chapter's central figures span several centuries of theological controversy, from the 2nd-century thinkers Valentinus, Marcion of Sinope, and Justin Martyr, through the 3rd-century prophet Mani and the 4th-century theologian Pelagius, each examined alongside their doctrines and opponents.

Chapter 3, "Persecution and Martyrdom," treats the interactions between Christians and the Roman state, as well as the memory of those encounters preserved in martyrdom accounts and the cult of the saints. Fredriksen stresses the ancient overlap between religion and politics, locating the discussion within classical ideas of the relationship between the divine and civic well-being. After expanding on the persecution of Christians in the Roman Empire, the book delves into the mobilization of martyr-rhetoric for intra-Christian violence after Christianity became the dominant faith.

Chapter 4, "The Future of the End," is a short chapter that examines Christian eschatology. The author traces the development of apocalyptic expectation from Paul's belief in an imminent return of Christ through the gradual recession of end-time hopes, covering evolving ideas about last judgement, heaven and hell, and resurrection.

Chapter 5, "Christ and Empire," covers the emergence of theology as a project intertwined with imperial power. The chapter situates the development of creeds, councils, and doctrines about Christ within the philosophical frameworks and political priorities of the era, in what the author describes as the imperialization of the church. Lieu notes that this chapter is most interested in the course of imperial intervention during the latter part of the period.

Chapter 6, "The Redemption of the Flesh," presents Christian approaches to the body, including ascetic practices such as fasting, sexual renunciation, and voluntary poverty. Fredriksen traces these practices to their Roman, Platonic, and Jewish roots, while showing how they took on new force in Christian formulation. The chapter also includes the views of Origen and others and their debates about the nature of the soul and the status of the flesh.

Chapter 7, "Pagan and Christian," examines the construction of a consciously Christian identity alongside the idea that there existed a "pagan" culture that Christians had left behind. Fredriksen argues that the category of "paganism" was largely a rhetorical creation by Christians seeking to define what made their own practices distinct. In this chapter, Fredriksen develops her idea of a "second Church" as an everyday religion, making use of amulets, spells, feasting, and the celebration of the dead, existing alongside the institutional church of clerics, doctrines and ascetics. Lieu notes that the actual experience and practices of ordinary Christians only really surface in this final chapter, which explores the core elements of popular religiosity, especially surrounding magic, daimones, and rituals, and the evidence of their persistence within Christian communities despite the efforts of authorities and councils.

In her conclusion, Fredriksen addresses the question of why Christianity became the dominant religion of the Roman Mediterranean. She argues that its success was not attributable to any inherently superior religiosity. Instead, she points to the combination of Roman commitment to right religio as essential to the well being of the state with "a Jewish apocalyptic commitment to the exclusive worship of one God over all the nations."

The book also includes a timeline, a glossary of specialist terminology, bibliographic essays recommending further reading per chapter, several maps, and indices of primary sources, modern authors, names and places, and topics.

== Reviews ==
The book has been described as a reworking of Henry Chadwick's The Early Church, a 1967 study long used as a university textbook. Fredriksen herself notes that it had become outdated in both methodology and thematic focus and therefore required updating.

In a Bryn Mawr Classical Review review, Ellen Muehlberger, a historian of ancient Christianity, called the book "an outstanding tool for classroom use" that introduces newcomers to the field while also demonstrating current historical methods. She praised Fredriksen for achieving a balance between presenting complex historiographical issues and maintaining an authoritative voice appropriate for an introductory text. She also highlighted the book's extensive use of evidence, noting that nearly every sentence in a paragraph corresponds to an identifiable ancient source, making the work both a clear narrative for students and a resource for lesson planning by teachers. She also noted that the book leans toward Fredriksen's areas of expertise, with Paul and Augustine making frequent appearances, and Greek and Latin sources predominating over Syriac and Coptic material. Muehlberger stated that she was revising her undergraduate survey course to make the book required reading.

Former Archbishop of Canterbury Rowan Williams, reviewing the book in The Times Literary Supplement, praised its synthesis of recent scholarship. He commended Fredriksen's treatment of early Christian anti-Judaism and her analysis of apocalyptic thought as a driver of intolerance. However, he also argued that the author underestimates the seriousness of pre-fourth-century doctrinal divisions, suggesting that it was the existing intensity of disagreement, rather than simply the arrival of an emperor sympathetic to Christianity, that prompted Constantine to convene the Council of Nicaea. Williams also found Fredriksen's occasional use of the term "denominations" anachronistic. Additionally, he noted the book's relative silence on liturgy, art, and the Eucharist, as well as on the psychological depth of early monastic literature and the philosophical contributions of writers such as Gregory of Nyssa and Augustine. Nevertheless, he stated he would recommend the book to students beginning their study of the subject.

Theologian Judith Lieu, in The Journal of Ecclesiastical History, placed the book within a broader wave of introductions to early Christianity, alongside Hartmut Leppin's The Early Christians and Joyce E. Salisbury's The First Christian Communities, noting that all three share a preference for thematic structure over a more chronological one. She identified Fredriksen's acknowledged intellectual debts to Peter Brown, Elizabeth Clark, and Ramsay MacMullen, as visible in the book's emphasis on identity, alterity, and the social function of texts. Lieu praised the book's accessible style and the absence of technical terms. However, she also observed that readers accustomed to more traditional accounts might regret the lack of interest in baptismal, eucharistic, or catechectical practices, or in mission, ministry structures, and the development of the biblical canon. Lieu also noted a narrow geographical focus; although Africa, Egypt, and Syria are indeed mentioned, the distinctive practices and worldviews associated with each are not explored. She concluded that the book should be welcomed making those initial centuries accessible without negating their variety.

Dana Robinson, in The American Historical Review, described the book as elegantly written, theologically rich, and socially nuanced. Robinson praised Fredriksen's treatment of the labels "Jewish," "Christian," and "pagan" not as fixed identities but as ever-changing rhetorical strategies. She highlighted the book's concluding argument that Christianity owed its dominance to its simultaneous absorption of Roman civic religiosity and the Jewish monotheistic apocalypticism. Robinson also acknowledged that the non-chronological structure and philosophical complexity might pose challenges to some readers, though Fredriksen provides contextual aids to support them.

Biblical scholar Florence Morgan Gillman, reviewing the book in The Catholic Biblical Quarterly, praised it as a clear, engaging, and comprehensive text well suited for courses in early Christianity. She highlighted Fredriksen's view of what she called "peripheral vision", i.e. an approach attentive to variations, contradictions, and anomalies rather than following a linear narrative. Gillman noted that this thematic structure might nevertheless produce a somewhat less straightforward reading experience for students accustomed to a decade-by-decade approach. She commended Fredriksen's incorporation of non-canonical and para-canonical material alongside archaeology and the wider Mediterranean context.

Historian Andrew S. Jacobs, writing in Journal of Early Christian Studies, welcomed the shift from traditional teleology toward social diversity, but acknowledged that the absence of the succession of periods, creeds, canons and councils, could be challenging. Jacobs praised individual chapters, singling out the chapter on embodiment and asceticism as especially enjoyable for the way it traced the theme across Jewish sectarian precedents, Pauline thought, theology, and Christian monasticism.

Theologian Josef Lössl, writing in Church History and Religious Culture, called the book "marvellous" and praised its combination of scholarship with accessible prose. He highlighted the book's didactic apparatus, including the chapter abstracts, timeline, glossary, and multiple indices, as making it well suited for teaching at both undergraduate and graduate levels. He drew attention to the author's argument in the final chapter about a "second Church" of lived religion existing alongside the institutional church of clergy, martyrs and ascetics. He also observed that as Fredriksen explores more facets of Christianity across the period, her account suggests that rather than simply becoming dominant, Christianity was in some ways absorbed back into the religious world of the ancient Mediterranean. He also emphasized the author's analysis of Christian intolerance, noting her argument that the persistent resort to coercion by emperors, bishops, and ascetic leaders, suggests they did not feel securely in charge.

Scholar Anne-Marie Schultz, writing for Augustinian Studies, calls the book "an excellent, highly readable, well-organized book." She praised its readability, writing that "the audience for the book would include not only scholars in the field, but academics in adjacent fields, and even a non-academic audience would find the book accessible."

Michael Dirda, in a review published in The Washington Post, writes that the book is "unlikely to please conservative religionists" but nevertheless "a masterwork of scholarly research and thought." He summarizes the book as portraying early "Christianities" as diverse and contested movements that were later "gradually, then forcefully, silenced" as imperial and ecclesiastical authorities imposed doctrinal conformity. Jesus appears as an observant Jew whose mission remained within Judaism, while the post-crucifixion movement broadened toward Gentiles only after the anticipated apocalyptic consummation failed to occur, especially through Paul's outreach to non-Jews already drawn to Jewish communities. Dirda also elaborates on Fredriksen's challenge to the common image of the constant persecution of early Christians, quoting her statement that in the Roman world "Most religions, indeed, were neither legal nor illegal: they simply were," with conflict arising especially when Christians refused civic religious obligations. The decisive shift came under Constantine, who, seeking political stability, sponsored the Council of Nicaea to secure "concord," after which dissenting views were increasingly classified as heresy. Dirda concludes that, in Fredriksen's view, Christianity would not have become the global institution it did without "the help – and the legalistic, organizational example – of the Roman Empire."

== See also ==
- When Christians Were Jews: The First Generation
- Christianity in the 1st century
- Christianity in late antiquity
- Split of Christianity and Judaism
- Spread of Christianity

== Bibliography ==
=== Reviews ===
- Dirda, Michael (2024). "The long entangled history of Christianity and politics". The Washington Post.
- Gillman, Florence M. (2025). "Ancient Christianities: The First Five Hundred Years by Paula Fredriksen". The Catholic Biblical Quarterly. 87 (3): 536–537.
- Freeman, Michelle (2025). "Ancient Christianities: The First Five Hundred Years". Religion. 55 (2). doi:10.1080/0048721X.2025.2468111.
- Jacobs, Andrew S. (2025). "Ancient Christianities: The First Five Hundred Years by Paula Fredriksen". Journal of Early Christian Studies. 33 (3): 499–501.
- Lieu, Judith (2025). "Ancient Christianities. The First Five Hundred Years. By Paula Fredriksen". The Journal of Ecclesiastical History. 76 (4): 874–876.
- Lössl, Josef (2025). "Ancient Christianities: The First Five Hundred Years, by Paula Fredriksen". Church History and Religious Culture. 105 (2): 245–247. doi:10.1163/18712428-10502001. ISSN 1871-241X.
- Muehlberger, Ellen (2025). "Review of Ancient Christianities: The First Five Hundred Years by Paula Fredriksen". Bryn Mawr Classical Review (2025.10.13).
- Robinson, Dana (2025). "Review of Ancient Christianities: The First Five Hundred Years by Paula Fredriksen". The American Historical Review. 130 (4): 1748–1750. doi:10.1093/ahr/rhaf555.
- Schultz, Anne-Marie (2025). "Paula Fredriksen, Ancient Christianities. The First Five Hundred Years". Augustinian Studies. 56 (2): 351–355. doi:10.5840/augstudies2025562109.
- Williams, Rowan (2025). "Gathering in the nations: the extraordinary diversity of early Christian communities". Times Literary Supplement.
