= When Christians Were Jews: The First Generation =

2018 book by Paula Fredriksen

- cover
- Author: Paula Fredriksen
- Language: English
- Subject: Christianity in the 1st century, historical Jesus, Jewish Christianity, Jerusalem church, apocalyptic and messianic expectations in late Second Temple Judaism, Paul and the mission to gentiles
- Genre: Non-fiction
- Publisher: Yale University Press
- Publication date: 2018
- Pages: 256
- ISBN: 9780300248401
- Website: site

When Christians Were Jews: The First Generation is a 2018 book by Paula Fredriksen that explores the social and intellectual history of earliest Christianity. The book argues that the earliest followers of Jesus were not "Christians" in the later sense but Jews who remained embedded within Jewish religious life and interpreted Jesus of Nazareth entirely through Jewish categories.

Fredriksen reconstructs the earliest Jerusalem-based Jesus movement by critically reassessing the Book of Acts in the New Testament. She contends that Jesus' first disciples believed he was the Messiah whose death, resurrection, and imminent return were a sign of the approaching end of times, yet they did not see themselves as leaving Judaism or founding a separate religion. The book also argues that early Jesus-followers did not reject the Jerusalem Temple or its priesthood, contrary to common Christian assumptions, but generally continued to honor its sanctity and authority. A central question of the book is how this movement survived when the expected end did not arrive: Fredriksen contends that the group adapted by reinterpreting scripture, reshaping Jesus traditions, and reading the trauma of the Roman conquest of Jerusalem and the destruction of the Second Temple as confirmation that history was still moving toward fulfillment.

== Description ==
The book was written for a general audience. It is a direct response to James D. G. Dunn's Christianity in the Making, Vol. 2: Beginning from Jerusalem, which was published in 2009. The book belongs to a stream of scholarship that situates the early Jesus-following movement within its Jewish context, building on, while also critiquing, E. P. Sanders' 1985 book Jesus and Judaism.

The book's title was selected by Fredriksen's editor before the manuscript was written and may give the impression that the work primarily concerns the early relationship of Christianity and Judaism. Fredriksen herself challenged the title, stating in the book: "I would dispute my own title", and arguing that applying the label "Christian" to the first generation of the Christ movement is misleading because it imposes a later category onto a group that still belonged within a Jewish context.

== Content ==
Chapter One, "Up to Jerusalem", begins by returning to Jesus in order to explain the later crisis of the earliest followers. It argues that Jesus's mission was centered on Jerusalem, giving priority to the Gospel of John over the Synoptic Gospels in reconstructing his movements, and uses this to explain why his followers in Galilee settled in Jerusalem despite having no ties there and painful memories associated with the city.

Chapter Two, "God's Holy Mountain", examines why Jesus was executed at this particular Passover if, as Fredriksen argues, he had long been a familiar figure in Jerusalem. It rejects the view that his death was caused by the "Cleansing of the Temple" and instead asks why earlier inaction by the authorities gave way to Jesus's arrest and execution. Fredriksen links Jesus's execution to a change in his apocalyptic message. She suggests that his message about the coming Kingdom of God shifted from something expected "soon" to something expected "now". According to this reconstruction, that change heightened public excitement, with crowds hailing Jesus as "King of the Jews". Roman governor Pontius Pilate, anxious about unrest in Passover and encouraged by concerned Jewish elites, had Jesus executed primarily as a warning to the crowds. Nevertheless, he seems not to have viewed his followers as a serious threat, as indicated by the fact that he did not move against them after the crucifixion.

Chapter Three, "From Miracle to Mission", turns to Jesus's earliest followers and examines why they continued after his execution. Fredriksen presents Jesus's death as a crisis for his followers, since it seemed to conflict with his proclamation of the coming kingdom. She argues that their reports of appearances of a risen Jesus and the expectation of an imminent end worked together to resolve that crisis and sustain the movement. These convictions led the followers to settle in Jerusalem and to continue Jesus's mission of preparing Israel for the coming kingdom. According to Fredriksen, the movement's outlook drew on continued engagement with Jewish scripture while also introducing the idea that the Messiah would return a second time, even though the resurrection of a single individual was not part of the apocalyptic expectations current in late Second Temple Judaism.

Chapter Four, "Beginning from Jerusalem", examines what Fredriksen describes as the earliest community's shift from waiting for the imminent end to active outreach. It presents Jesus's earliest followers as centered in Jerusalem, oriented toward the Temple, and initially on generally untroubled terms with other Jews and Jewish leaders. The chapter then traces how some members of the movement, especially Paul the Apostle, adapted their message as the expected end continued to be delayed. As they carried Jesus's mission to communities in the Jewish diaspora, they encountered gentile "God-fearers" (non-Jewish sympathizers of Judaism) in synagogues who were receptive to their message. This strengthened the movement's apocalyptic expectations, since it aligned with biblical end-time prophecies that anticipated the nations would, in the end, renounce their gods and worship the God of Israel alongside Israel.

Chapter Five, "The Ends of the Ages", argues that the earliest persecutions of Jesus's followers by Jews were primarily disciplinary actions within Jewish communities, similar to those experienced by Paul, rather than external attacks from a separate group. According to Fredriksen, these measures were connected to the social tensions created when gentile converts abandoned civic worship, from which Jews were exempt. By this point, Jews allowed God-fearers to participate in synagogues without requiring them to renounce their other gods; the Christ-following movement, however, demanded exclusive allegiance to the God of Israel, thereby disrupting the religious pluralism of Hellenistic cities. This could have raised concerns within Jewish communities about violence from their pagan neighbors. The chapter also explores disputes in the earliest Christian sources over proper conduct for Jewish and gentile believers, and presents them as consequences of the delay of the second coming of Christ. It concludes that the movement remained centered in Jerusalem and embedded within the world of Judaism until their disappearance in the aftermath of Jerusalem's destruction in 70 AD, at the height of the First Jewish Revolt against Rome.

In the book's epilogue, Fredriksen returns to her main thesis, that the founding generation of the Jesus movement should not be treated as members of a separate religion distinct from Judaism. She emphasizes that she has avoided terms such as "Christian" and "church" because, in her view, they anachronistically suggest a religious separation, whereas the movement's first generation consisted of observant Jews. The epilogue also uses the diversity of late Second Temple Judaism to frame the gospels as a form of scriptural creativity and explains that ancient ideas of divinity operated along a graded spectrum rather than a strict human-divine binary; In Fredriksen's formulation, for the early Jesus movement, "Jesus was high on the cosmic gradient, but he was nonetheless human". The epilogue also argues that Paul, Peter, and James broadly agreed that gentile believers could belong to the movement if they abandoned the worship of other gods and devoted themselves exclusively to the God of Israel. Fredriksen closes by disputing her own title, arguing that calling this first generation "Christian" distorts its historical context.

== Reception ==
Historian Andrew S. Jacobs, writing in Bryn Mawr Classical Review, described the book as a "lucid and straightforward" and "compelling reconstruction" of the earliest Jesus movement in its Jewish setting consistent with the author's long-running effort of presenting the origins of Christianity within Judaism. Jacobs adds that some scholars may dispute aspects of Fredriksen's reconstruction, including her argument that Jesus and his followers should not be understood as armed insurrectionists and her interpretation of Paul's statements about the Law; he cites in particular debate over whether the Greek term makhaira in the Gospels should be read as "knife" rather than "sword". Nevertheless, he describes the book as "thoroughly researched" and "deeply learned", praising its readable style, its use of Paul's letters, Josephus, the Dead Sea Scrolls, and the Gospels, and its accessibility to both specialists and general readers.

Historian J. Albert Harrill, in a review published in The American Historical Review, called the book "a valuable pick for beginners" and described it as "big on facts". He also noted that the book raises "a wider historiographical point beyond the particular specialty of New Testament studies". Theologist Philip Cunningham, writing in Studies in Christian-Jewish Relations, stated that the book "deserves a wide readership and will reward careful study." Classicist James Corke-Webster described it in Greece & Rome as "a book that delivers more than it promises", adding that it "represents a scholar in her prime". He also noted that, although he did not agree with everything in the book and found Fredriksen's model of Christian identity implausible, he nevertheless regarded it as "the most important, exciting, and enjoyable book in the field" that he had read in "some time".

== See also ==
- Ancient Christianities: The First Five Hundred Years
- Christianity in the 1st century
- Christian eschatology
- Jewish eschatology
- Jewish Christianity
- Historical Jesus
- Split of Christianity and Judaism

== Bibliography ==
- Fredriksen, Paula (2018). When Christians Were Jews: The First Generation. New Haven, Conn.: Yale University Press.

=== Reviews ===
- Corke-Webster, James (2021). "Roman History". Greece & Rome. 68 (1): 135–148. doi:10.1017/S0017383520000315.
- Cunningham, Philip A. (2019). "Paula Fredriksen. When Christians Were Jews: The First Generation". Studies in Christian-Jewish Relations. 14 (1).
- Jacobs, Andrew S. (2019-02-27). "Review of When Christians Were Jews: The First Generation, by Paula Fredriksen". Bryn Mawr Classical Review.
- Harrill, J. Albert (2020-02-03). "Paula Fredriksen. When Christians Were Jews: The First Generation. New Haven, Conn.: Yale University Press, 2018. Pp. viii, 261. Cloth $27.50". The American Historical Review. 125 (1): 292–293. doi:10.1093/ahr/rhz378.
