= Anti-Judaism =

Total or partial opposition to Judaism

Anti-Judaism denotes a spectrum of historical and contemporary ideologies that are fundamentally or partially rooted in opposition to Judaism. It encompasses the rejection or abrogation of the Mosaic covenant and advocates for the supersession of Judaism and Jewish identity by proponents of other religious, political-ideological, or theological frameworks, which assert their own precedence as the "light unto the nations" or as the chosen people of God. The opposition is often perpetuated through the reinterpretation and appropriation of Jewish prophecy and other Hebrew biblical texts, reflecting a complex interplay of belief systems that challenge Jews' internally and externally conceived distinctiveness. David Nirenberg posits that the theme has manifested throughout history, including in contemporary and early Christianity, Islam, nationalism, Enlightenment rationalism, and in socioeconomic contexts.

Douglas R. A. Hare found at least three anti-Judaisms in history. The first is prophetic anti-Judaism: the criticism of Judaism's beliefs and religious practices. The second is Jewish Christian anti-Judaism: the form taken amongst Jews who believe that Jesus of Nazareth was the Jewish Messiah. The third type he defined was gentilizing anti-Judaism, which emphasizes the gentile character of the new movement (i.e., Christianity) and asserts God's formal supersessionist rejection of Jews as a people. Most scholarly analyses appear concerned with the phenomenon described by the third type.

According to Gavin I. Langmuir, anti-Judaism is based on "total or partial opposition to Judaism as a religion—and the total or partial opposition to Jews as adherents of it—by persons who accept a competing system of beliefs and practices and consider certain genuine Judaic beliefs and practices inferior."

As the rejection of a particular religion or particular way of thinking about God, anti-Judaism is distinct from antisemitism. An example of religious anti-Judaism is the Islamic doctrine known as tahrif.

== Terminology ==
The term "anti-Jewish" is often colloquially used interchangeably with terms such as "antisemitic", "anti-Hebrew", or "anti-Judaism". Although these designations share a commonality—hatred towards a group of people—each term encompasses unique ideologies and prejudices. Jeanne Favret-Saada, author of the 2014 HAU: Journal of Ethnographic Theory article "A Fuzzy Distinction: Anti-Judaism and Anti-Semitism," explains the ways in which historians often conflate anti-Judaism and antisemitism, failing to distinguish between Christian anti-Judaism and Nazi antisemitism. Favret-Saada argues that the combination of these distinct ideologies diminishes the Christian role in the evolution from anti-Judaism to antisemitism. Anti-Judaism encapsulates those who oppose the Jewish religion and religious system. The term refers to Christian animosity towards Judaism as a religion. Anti-Judaism historically included attempts to convert Jews to Christianity. In contrast, the term "antisemitic" is more modern and secular term, categorizing Jews as a racial or ethnic group. Antisemites hate and target Jews for their ethnic Jewish identity rather than religious beliefs.

== Pre-Christian Roman Empire ==
In Ancient Rome, religion was an integral part of the civil government. Beginning with the Roman Senate's declaration of the divinity of Julius Caesar on 1 January 42 BCE, some emperors were proclaimed gods on Earth and demanded to be worshiped accordingly throughout the Roman Empire. This created religious difficulties for those Jews, who were monotheists and adhered strictly to Jewish law, and worshipers of Mithras, Sabazius and early Christians. At the time of Jesus's ministry, the Jews of the Roman Empire were a respected and privileged minority whose influence was enhanced by a relatively high level of literacy. The Jews were granted a number of concessions by the Romans, including the right to observe Shabbat and to substitute prayers for the emperor in place of participation in the imperial cult. They had been exempted from military service on the Sabbath, for example. Julius Caesar, who never forgot the debt he owed to Antipater the Idumaean for playing a decisive role in the Siege of Alexandria (thereby saving his life and career), was supportive of Jews, allowing them uniquely a right to assembly and to collect funds for Jerusalem. His enmity toward Pompey, who had conquered Jerusalem and defiled the Holy of Holies, enhanced his status among Roman Jewish leadership, as he ordered the reconstruction of the walls of Jerusalem after the destruction wrought by Pompey. He may also have cultivated Jews as clients to buttress his position in the East against the latter. At times, he treated High Priest of Israel Hyrcanus II on equal terms by writing to him as Rome's pontifex maximus. Jews reacted to Julius Caesar's assassination by mourning him publicly in Rome.

The crisis under Caligula (37–41 CE) has been proposed as the "first open break between Rome and the Jews", even though problems were already evident during the Census of Quirinius in 6 CE and under Sejanus (before 31 CE). (Note: "The reign of Gaius Caligula (37–41) witnessed the first open break between the Jews and the Julio-Claudian empire. Until then—if one accepts Sejanus' heyday and the trouble caused by the census after Archelaus' banishment—there was usually an atmosphere of understanding between the Jews and the empire. … These relations deteriorated seriously during Caligula's reign, and, though after his death the peace was outwardly re-established, considerable bitterness remained on both sides. … Caligula ordered that a golden statue of himself be set up in the Temple in Jerusalem. … Only Caligula's death, at the hands of Roman conspirators (41), prevented the outbreak of a Jewish-Roman war that might well have spread to the entire East.")

After the Jewish–Roman wars (66–135), Hadrian changed the name of Iudaea province to Syria Palaestina and Jerusalem to Aelia Capitolina in an attempt to erase the historical ties of the Jewish people to the region. (Note: "In an effort to wipe out all memory of the bond between the Jews and the land, Hadrian changed the name of the province from Iudaea to Syria-Palestina, a name that became common in non-Jewish literature.") However, this argument has been pointed out as a mere assumption, with no basis in historical sources, according to other scholars. After 70 CE, Jews and Jewish proselytes were only allowed to practice their religion if they paid the Fiscus Judaicus (Jewish tax), and after 135 were barred from Jerusalem except for the day of Tisha B'Av. Frequent Jewish uprisings (two major wars in 66–73 and 133–136 CE, in addition to uprisings in Alexandria and Cyrene), xenophobia, and Jewish prerogatives and idiosyncrasies, were at the root of anti-Jewish feelings in some segments of Roman society. These confrontations did cause temporary erosions in the status of the Jews in the empire. Reversals in the relationship were temporary and did not have a lasting impact.

Consul Titus Flavius Clemens was put to death in 95 CE for "living a Jewish life" or "drifting into Jewish ways", an accusation also frequently made against Early Christians, and which may well have been related to the administration of the Jewish tax under Domitian. (Note: "Domitian ordered the execution of Flavius Clemens … for Judaizing tendencies") The Roman Empire adopted Christianity as its state religion with the Edict of Thessalonica on 27 February 380.

== Christian anti-Judaism ==
=== Early Christianity and the Judaizers ===
Christianity originated as a sect of Second Temple Judaism. It was seen as such by the Jewish early Christians, as well as Jews in general. The wider Roman administration most likely would not have understood any distinction. Historians debate whether or not the Roman government distinguished between adherents of Christianity and Judaism before 96 CE, when Christians successfully petitioned Nerva to exempt them from the tax levied specifically on Roman Jews (the Fiscus Judaicus) on the basis that they (i.e., Christians) were not Jews. From then on, practising Jews paid the tax while Christians did not. Christianity is based on Jewish monotheism and includes the Hebrew Bible in its canon as the Old Testament (the development of which generally relied on the Septuagint and Jewish Aramaic targumim), as well as Jewish liturgy and the Seven Laws of Noah.

The main distinction of the early Christian community from its Jewish roots was the belief that Jesus was the long-awaited Messiah, (Note: "In effect, they [Jewish Christians] seemed to regard Christianity as an affirmation of every aspect of contemporary Judaism, with the addition of one extra belief—that Jesus was the Messiah. Unless males were circumcised, they could not be saved (Acts 15:1).") as in the Confession of Peter, but that in itself would not have severed the Jewish connection. Another point of divergence was the questioning by Christians of the continuing applicability of the Law of Moses (i.e., the Mosaic Law of the Torah), though the Apostolic Decree of the Apostolic Age of Christianity appears to parallel the Noahide Law of Judaism. The two issues came to be linked in a theological discussion within the Christian community as to whether the coming of the Messiah—in either first or future second coming—annulled some or all of the law given in the Hebrew Bible in what came to be called the New Covenant.

The circumcision controversy in early Christianity was probably the second issue—after that of Jesus being or not being the Jewish messiah—for which Christian theological argumentation grew into anti-Judaism, with those who argued that Jewish law continued to be applicable being labelled Judaizers (Galatians 2:14)—a pejorative—and Pharisees (e.g., Acts 15:5 and Matthew 3:7). In the NRSVUE translation of the New Testament, among others, these individuals are sometimes termed "scribes." (Note: See also Council of Jerusalem) The teachings of Paul (d. c. 67 CE), whose letters comprise much of the New Testament demonstrate a "long battle against Judaizing." However, James, brother of Jesus, who after Jesus's death was widely acknowledged as the leader of the Jerusalem Christians, worshiped at the Second Temple in Jerusalem until his death in 62 CE, thirty years after Jesus's death.

The destruction of the Second Temple in 70 CE would lead Christians to "doubt the efficacy of the ancient law", though Ebionism would linger on until the 5th century. However, Marcion of Sinope, who advocated rejecting the entirety of Judaic influence on the Christian faith, would be excommunicated by the Church in Rome in 144 CE.

=== Anti-Judaic polemic ===
Anti-Judaic works of this period include De Adversus Iudeaos by Tertullian, Octavius by Minucius Felix, De Catholicae Ecclesiae Unitate (Note: n.b. source likely means Cyprian's later treatise, Three Books of Testimonies Against the Jews bound under the title of his first treatise; so linked here) by Cyprian of Carthage, and Instructiones Adversus Gentium Deos by Lactantius. The traditional hypothesis holds that the anti-Judaism of these early Fathers of the Church "were inherited from the Christian tradition of biblical exegesis" though a second hypothesis holds that early Christian anti-Judaism was inherited from the pagan world. Miriam S. Taylor argues that theological Christian anti-Judaism "emerge[d] from the Church's efforts to resolve the contradictions inherent in its simultaneous appropriation and rejection of different elements of the Jewish tradition."

Modern scholars believe that Judaism may have been a missionary religion in the early centuries of the Common Era, converting so-called proselytes, and thus competition for the religious loyalties of gentiles drove anti-Judaism. The debate and dialogue moved from polemic to bitter verbal and written attacks one against the other. However, since the last decades of the 20th century, the view that a proselytizing struggle between turn-of-the-era Judaism and early Christianity may have been the main generator of anti-Jewish attitudes among early gentile believers in Jesus is eroding. Christian scholar and Anglican Church in North America deacon Scot McKnight revisited the traditional claims about Jewish proselytizing in a 1991 book and concluded that active Jewish proselytizing was a later apologetic construct that does not reflect the reality of first-century Judaism.

A statement about whether early Christian written texts, referred to as gilyonim (Jewish Babylonian Aramaic: גִּלְיוֹנִים, lit. 'margins') in tractate Shabbat 116a of the Talmud, could be left to burn in a fire on Shabbat is attributed to Rabbi Tarfon (d. 135 CE). Although a disputed interpretation, scholars Daniel Boyarin, Kuhn, Maier, and Paget, and Friedlander and Pearson identify said scrolls with the Christian Gospels: "The Gospels must be burned for paganism is not as dangerous to the Jewish faith as Jewish Christian sects." The anonymous Letter to Diognetus was the earliest apologetic work in the early Church to address Judaism. Justin Martyr (d. 165 CE) wrote the apologetic Dialogue with Trypho, a polemical pseudo-debate that outlines the justifications Christianity offers for the messiahship of Jesus by using the Hebrew Bible, contrasted with counter-arguments from a fictionalized version of Rabbi Tarfon. "For centuries defenders of Christ and the enemies of the Jews employed no other method" than these apologetics, argued Bernard Lazare. Apologetics were difficult as gentile converts could not be expected to understand Hebrew. Translations of the Septuagint into Greek prior to the work of Aquila of Sinope would serve as a basis for such cross-cultural arguments also demonstrated was Origen's difficulties debating Rabbi Simlai.

Although Roman emperor Hadrian was an "enemy of the synagogue", the reign of Antoninus Pius began a period of Roman benevolence toward the Judaism and Jews within the empire. Meanwhile, imperial hostility toward Christianity continued to crystallize; after Decius, the empire was at war with it. An unequal power relationship between Jews and Christians in the context of the Greco-Roman world generated anti-Jewish feelings among the early Christians. Feelings of mutual hatred arose, driven in part by Judaism's legality in the Roman Empire.

=== From Constantine to the 8th century ===
When Constantine and Licinius were issuing the Edict of Milan, the influence of Judaism was fading in the Land of Israel (in favor of Christianity) and seeing a rebirth outside the Roman Empire in Babylonia.

After his defeat of Licinius in 323 CE, Constantine showed a marked political preference for Christians. He repressed Jewish proselytism and forbade Jews from circumcising their slaves. Jews were barred from Jerusalem except on the anniversary of the Second Temple's destruction (Tisha B'Av) and then only after paying a special tax (probably the Fiscus Judaicus) in silver. He also promulgated a law which condemned to the stake Jews who persecuted their apostates by stoning. Christianity became the state religion of the Roman Empire (see Christendom), and in 351 the Jews of Palestine revolted against Constantine's son in the Jewish revolt against Constantius Gallus.

From the middle of the 5th century, apologetics ceased with Cyril of Alexandria. This form of anti-Judaism had proven futile and often served to strengthen Jewish faith. With Christianity ascendant in the Empire, the "Fathers, the bishops, and the priest who had to contend against the Jews treated them very badly. Hosius in Spain; Pope Sylvester I; Eusebius of Caesaria call them 'a perverse, dangerous, and criminal sect.'" While Gregory of Nyssa merely reproaches Jews as infidels, other teachers are more vehement. Saint Augustine labels the Talmudists as falsifiers; Saint Ambrose recycled the earlier anti-Christian trope and accuses Jews of despising Roman law. Saint Jerome claims Jews were possessed by an impure spirit. Saint Cyril of Jerusalem claimed the Jewish Patriarchs, or Nasi, were a low race.

All these theological and polemical attacks combined in Saint John Chrysostom's six sermons delivered at Antioch. Chrysostom, an archbishop of Constantinople (died 407 CE), is very negative in his treatment of Judaism, though much more hyperbolic in expression. While Justin's Dialogue is a philosophical treatise, John's homilies Against the Jews are a more informal and rhetorically forceful set of sermons preached in church. Delivered while Chrysostom was still a priest in Antioch, his homilies deliver a scathing critique of Jewish religious and civil life, warning Christians not to have any contact with Judaism or the synagogue and to keep away from their festivals.

"There are legions of theologians, historians and writers who write about the Jews the same as Chrysostom: Epiphanius, Diodorus of Tarsus, Theodore of Mopsuestia, Theodoret of Cyprus, Cosmas Indicopleustes, Athanasius the Sinaite among the Greeks; Hilarius of Poitiers, Prudentius, Paulus Orosius, Sulpicius Severus, Gennadius, Venantius Fortunatus, Isidore of Seville, among the Latins."

From the 4th to 7th centuries, while the bishops opposed Judaism in writing, the Empire enacted a variety of civil laws against Jews, such as forbidding them from holding public office, and an oppressive curial tax. Laws were enacted to harass their free observance of religion; Justinian went so far as to enact a law against Jewish daily prayers.

Through this period, Jewish revolts continued. During the Byzantine–Sasanian War of 602–628, many Jews sided with the Byzantine Empire against the Byzantine Empire in the Jewish revolt against Heraclius, which successfully assisted the invading Persian Sassanids in conquering all of Roman Egypt and Syria. In response, further anti-Jewish measures were enacted throughout the Byzantine realm and as far away as Merovingian France. Soon thereafter, 634, the Muslim conquests began, during which many Jews initially rose up again against their Byzantine rulers.

The pattern in which Jews were relatively free under pagan rulers until the Christian conversion of the leadership, as seen with Constantine, would be repeated in the lands beyond the now-collapsed Roman Empire. Sigismund of Burgundy enacted laws against Jews after coming to the throne after his conversion in 514; likewise after the conversion of Reccared, king of the Visigoths in 589, which would have lasting effect when codified by Reccesuinth in the Visigothic Code of Law. This code inspired Jews to aid Tariq ibn-Ziyad (a Muslim) in his overthrow of Roderick, and under the Moors (also Muslims), Jews regained their usurped religious freedoms.

=== After the 8th century ===
Beginning with the 8th century, legislation against heresies grew more severe. The Church, once confining itself to only the powers of canon law, increasingly appealed to secular powers. Heretics such as the Vaudois, Albigenses, Beghards, Apostolic Brothers, and Luciferians were thus "treated with cruelty" which culminated in the 13th century establishment of the Inquisition by Pope Innocent III. Jews were not ignored by such legislation, either, as they allegedly instigated Christians to judaizations, either directly or unconsciously, by their existence. They sent forth metaphysicians such as Amaury de Béne and David de Dinan; the Pasagians followed Mosaic Law; the Orleans heresy was a Jewish heresy; the Albigens taught Jewish doctrine as superior to Christian; the Dominicans preached against both the Hussites and their Jewish supporters, and thus the imperial army sent to advance on Jan Ziska massacred Jews along the way. In Spain, where Castilian custom (fueros) had granted equal rights to Muslims, Christians, and Jews, Gregory XI instituted the Spanish Inquisition to spy on Jews and Moors wherever "by words or writings they urged the Catholics to embrace their faith".

Usury became a proximate cause of much anti-Jewish sentiment during the Middle Ages. In Italy and later Poland and Germany, John of Capistrano stirred up the poor against the usury of the Jews; Bernardinus of Feltre, aided by the practical notion of establishing mont-de-piétés, called for the expulsion of Jews all over Italy and Tyrol and caused the massacre of the Jews at Trent. Kings, nobles, and bishops discouraged this behavior, protecting Jews from the monk Radulphe in Germany and countering the preachings of Bernardinus in Italy. These reactions were from knowing the history of mobs, incited against Jews, continuing attacks against their rich co-religionists. Anti-Judaism was a dynamic in the early Spanish colonies in the Americas, where Europeans used anti-Judaic memes and forms of thinking against Native and African peoples, in effect transferring anti-Judaism onto other peoples.

The Church kept to its theological anti-Judaism and, favoring the mighty and rich, was careful not to encourage the passions of the people. But while it sometimes interfered on behalf of the Jews when they were the objects of mob fury, it at the same time fueled the fury by combating Judaism.

=== During the Reformation ===
Martin Luther has been accused of antisemitism, primarily in relation to his statements about Jews in his book On the Jews and their Lies, which describes the Jews in extremely harsh terms, excoriating them, and providing detailed recommendation for a pogrom against them and their permanent oppression and/or expulsion. According to Paul Johnson, it "may be termed the first work of modern anti-Semitism, and a giant step forward on the road to the Holocaust". In contrast, Roland Bainton, noted church historian and Luther biographer, wrote "One could wish that Luther had died before ever this tract was written. His position was entirely religious and in no respect racial".

Peter Martyr Vermigli, a shaper of Reformed Protestantism, took pains to maintain the contradiction, going back to Paul of Tarsus, of Jews being both enemy and friend, writing: "The Jews are not odious to God for the very reason they are Jews; for how could this have happened since they were embellished with so many great gifts...."

== Scholarly analyses and contrasts ==
"The terms 'anti-Judaism' (the Christian aversion toward the Jewish religion) and 'antisemitism' (aversion toward the Jews as a racial or ethnic group) are omnipresent in the controversies over the churches' responsibility with regard to the extermination of the Jews" and "since 1945, most of the works on 'anti-Semitism' have contrasted this term with 'anti-Judaism'".

According to Jeanne Favret-Saada, the scientific analysis of the links and difference between both terms is made difficult for two reasons. First is the definition: some scholars argue that "anti-Judaic" refers to Christian theology and to Christian theology only while others argue that the term applies also to the discriminatory policy of the churches [...]. Some authors also advance that eighteenth-century catechisms were "antisemitic" and others argue that the term cannot be used before the date of its first appearance in 1879. The second difficulty is that these two concepts place themselves in different contexts: the old and religious for the "anti-Judaism" the new and political for antisemitism.

As examples regarding the nuances put forward by scholars:

- Leon Poliakov, in The History of Anti-Semitism (1991) describes a transition from anti-Judaism to an atheist antisemitism going in parallel with the transition from religion to science, as if the former had vanished in the later and therefore differentiating both. In The Aryan Myth (1995) he nevertheless writes that with the arrival of antisemitism, "the ineradicable feelings and resentments of the Christian West were to be expressed thereafter in a new vocabulary". According to Jeanne Fabret, "[if] there were fewer Christians going to church during the age of science, [...] religious representations kept shaping minds."
- For Gavin Langmuir, anti-Judaism is concerned with exaggerated accusations against Jews which nonetheless contain a particle of truth or evidence, whereas antisemitism reaches beyond unusual general inferences and is concerned with false suppositions. Thus Langmuir considers the labelling of Jews as 'Christ-killers' as anti-Judaic; accusations of well-poisoning, on the other hand, he regards as antisemitic. In his view, anti-Judaism and antisemitism have existed side by side from the 12th century onwards and have strengthened each other ever since. The blood libel is another example of antisemitism, though it is based in distorted notions of Judaism.
- David Nirenberg, in his 2013 book Anti-Judaism: The Western Tradition "has produced a sweeping and exhilarating new intellectual history of Western thought, including Islam, that argues that hostility to Judaism is at the heart of Western culture, not incidental to it and not the product of economic crisis, historical tension, or political tendencies. Rather it is a formative element of our culture, the marrow of its bones, and one of the critical tools of self-definition. From Ptolemaic Egypt to Early Christianity, from the Spanish Inquisition and Catholic Middle Ages to the Protestant Reformation, from the Enlightenment to modernity, from revolutionary politics to fascism, whenever the West has wanted to define what it is not, whenever it has tried to define and name its deepest fears and aversions — Judaism is the name and concept that came most easily to mind", e.g., tracking the allegation of Jewish impiety toward the gods and misanthropy, a core element of anti-Judaism in the version formulated by Manetho throughout history to the current day, defining the term as a "theoretical framework for making sense of the world in terms of Jews and Judaism."
- In agreeing with Nirenberg's analysis and conclusion while recommending the book, Paula Frederiksen presents his thesis with these quotes: "Anti-Judaism should not be understood as some archaic or irrational closet in the vast edifices of Western thought," Nirenberg observes in his introduction. "It was rather one of the basic tools with which that edifice was constructed." And as he ominously concludes, hundreds of pages later, "We live in an age in which millions of people are exposed daily to some variant of the argument that the challenges of the world they live in are best explained in terms of ‘Israel’." She describes the formation of Early Christianity as "warring sects of mostly ex-pagan gentiles", stating that "the war was against heresy; the target was other gentile Christians. But the ammunition of choice was anti-Judaism.
- Jean-Paul Sartre's essay The Anti-Semite and the Jew observes that "if the Jew did not exist, the antisemite would invent him."
- Anti-Judaism has been distinguished from antisemitism based upon racial or ethnic grounds (racial antisemitism). "The dividing line [is] the possibility of effective conversion [...]. [A] Jew ceases[] to be a Jew upon baptism." However, with racial antisemitism, "the assimilated Jew [is] still a Jew, even after baptism [...]." According to William Nichols, "[f]rom the Enlightenment onward, it is no longer possible to draw clear lines of distinction between religious and racial forms of hostility towards Jews [...]. Once Jews have been emancipated and secular thinking makes its appearance without leaving behind the old Christian hostility towards Jews, the new term antisemitism becomes almost unavoidable, even before explicitly racist doctrines appear."
- Similarly, in Anna Bikont's investigation of "the massacre of Jews in wartime Jedwabne, Poland" in The Crime and the Silence, she recognizes the presence of antisemitism as a result of religious influence that is blurred with anti-Judaism characteristics. Bikont's explanation of life in Poland as a Jew post World War I reveals how it is often difficult to distinguish between anti-Judaism and antisemitism during this time of growing anti-Judaic ideology. Poles and Jews "lived separate lives and spoke different languages" which prevented Jews from fully assimilating into Poland culture. Jewish religious culture remained present and Jew's "social and cultural life ran on a separate track" compared to Poles. The ethnic differences were made more obvious through the obvious differences in culture which fuel anti-Judaic acts. Although Jews ran separate lives from Poles, they coexisted for a long time. "Jews, especially the young, got along fine in Polish, but at home they spoke Yiddish." Socially, Jews and Poles often participated in "picnics, festivities [together]... but Jews [were] often met with an unfriendly response from Poles, and in the latter half of the thirties they were simply thrown out of these organizations." Bikont believes that negative views towards Jews were reinforced through religious organizations like the Catholic Church and National Party in northern Europe. "The lives of Catholics revolved around the parish and the world of churchgoers, as well as events organized by the National Party, which was blatant in its exclusion of Jews. Bikont considers that the murderous actions towards Jews in Poland resulted from "[teachings of] contempt and hostility towards Jews, feelings that were reinforced in the course of their upbringing." These events are classified as antisemitic because of the change from increase of hostility and exclusion. The delusional perception of Jews escalated in 1933 when there was a "[revolution that] swept up the whole town... 'Shooting, windows broken, shutters closed, women shrieking, running home." Bikont believes that these violent aggressions towards Jews are considered acts of antisemitism because they are performed as revolutionary acts that were a part of the National Party's agenda. Much of the difference between defining anti-Judaism from antisemitism relies on the source of influence for beliefs and actions against Jews. Once Jews were viewed as the other from Poles, the discrimination transformed from ideology of religion to race which are shown through acts of violence.

== Islamic anti-Judaism ==
=== Early Islam ===
Throughout the Islamic Golden Age, the relatively tolerant societies of the various caliphates were still, on occasion, driven to enforce discriminatory laws against members of the Jewish faith. Examples of these and more extreme persecutions occurred under the authority of multiple, radical Muslim Movements such as that of the Fatimid Caliph Al-Hakim bi-Amr Allah in the 11th century, the Almohad Caliphate in the 12th century, and in the 1160s CE Shiite Abd al-Nabi ibn Mahdi who was an Imam of Yemen.

Islamic texts also accused the Jews of hostility, though it is portrayed as ineffectual: the Jews disobey Moses, and are quelled; they try to crucify Jesus, and fail; the Jews oppose Mohammed, but they are overcome and punished by expulsion, enslavement or death. The settlement made with the Jews after the battle of Khaybar gave the precedent for the further treatment of non-Muslim minorities under Muslim rule. According to sura 9:29 (Quran 9:29), Muslims are to fight against people of the Book (i.e. Christians and Jews) until they are subjugated, pay the jizya and are fully humbled.

=== From the Islamic Conquests to the Late Middle Ages ===
During the first centuries after the early Muslim conquests these principles were incorporated into the dhimma system whose main feature were outlined latest by the reign of the eightcentury Caliph Umar II (717–720). Under that system, Jews were not to proselytise, not pray to loud, not build new houses of worship or repair hold ones and not hold public processions, including for funerals. Similar to life under Christian rule, Jews were not allowed to bear arms or ride horses under Muslim rules, which is why popular anecdotes among Muslims derided the Jews as cowards. The notion of toleration-protection with humiliation took various forms throughout the period, such as prohibitions against going outdoors in the rain, distinguishing clothing from Muslims, that often was also meant to ridicule such as the wearing of mismatched shoes, and various other discriminatory laws that were enforced in various degrees. Though highly erratic, the wearing of special clothes became more widespread in later centuries, such as the wearing of specifically dyed outer garments or certain badges, which originated in early medieval Baghdad and were later taken over in the Christian West.

Outright persecution of non-Muslims such as Jews was infrequent, but could happen at the whim of rulers. Jews who overstepped these rules of humiliation were perceived to have broken the contract of protection through arrogance and haughtiness and death was a just punishment. This led among other things to the 1066 Granada massacre, in which Examples more extreme persecutions occurred under the authority of multiple, radical Muslim Movements such as that of the Fatimid Caliph Al-Hakim bi-Amr Allah in the 11th century, the Almohad Caliphate in the 12th century, and in the 1160s CE Shiite Abd al-Nabi ibn Mahdi who was an Imam of Yemen. Forced conversions were in general rare as the greater majority of Muslims adhered to the Quran that there is no compulsion in religious, but did occur on rare occasion such as during the Almohad Caliphate. As Jews shared their dhimmi status with other more numerous and conscipuous Christians and Zoroastrians, the suspicion against those often mitigated and diffused specific anti-Jewish sentiment.

In the Later Middle Ages, the Jews and other non-Muslim minorities in Muslim countries became increasingly marginalised and also numerically smaller. The decline of secular influence within Islamic society and external threats posed by non-Muslims resulted in a stronger enforcement of the differentiation laws. In 1438, the Jews from Fez where brought into a new quarter, the mellah, which became the prototype for Moroccan ghettos. This removal came in the aftermath of anti-Jewish tumults that broke out after a rumour came up that Jews had poured wine into the lamp reservoir of a mosque, an accusation that has parallels to the Host desecration in Europe.

Authors from that period such as the Andalusi Ibn Hazm and the Jewish convert to Islam Al-Samawal al-Maghribi also continued the allegations of tahrif and claimed that Uzair (the Biblical Ezra) was responsible for this tampering and begun looking for perceived inaccuracies and contradictions in the Old and New Testament. Nevertheless, in general medieval Muslim theologians devoted only a small part of their polemics against Judaism.

=== Early Modern Period ===
In Yemen, the Orphans' Decree was used to take minors whose parents (sometimes only one) died, convert them to Islam, and give them to a Muslim family or a Residential school to be raised as Muslims. This was in place at least since the 17th century, as Shalom Shabazi wrote in one of his poems about "stealing orphans".

Other anti-Jewish acts in Yemen include the Mawza Exile (1679–1680). Testimonies claim up to 80% of the Jewish population in Yemen died during that year.

"Those who were banished then came up from the Tihama [coastal plain], returning from Mawzaʻ; one man from a city and two from a family, for most of them had been consumed by the land of Tihama which dispenses of life." Another instance of forced conversion took place in 1839 in Meshed, Iran.

Many religious texts and establishments were destroyed or stolen during that time period. In the aftermath, anti-Jewish laws were established.

== See also ==
- Antireligion and antitheism
- Antisemitism
- Anti-Zionism
- Christianity and Judaism
- Christianity and other religions
- Christian–Jewish reconciliation
- Christian observances of Jewish holidays
- Christian views on the Old Covenant
- Christian Zionism
- Groups claiming affiliation with Israelites
- Judaizers
- Philosemitism
- Anti-Christian sentiment
- Criticism of Christianity
  - Anti-Catholicism
  - Anti-clericalism
  - Anti-Mormonism
  - Anti-Protestantism
  - Persecution of Christians
  - Persecution of Oriental Orthodox Christians
  - Persecution of Eastern Orthodox Christians
  - Persecution of Jehovah's Witnesses
  - Sectarian violence among Christians
- History of Christianity
  - Christianity and violence
    - History of Christian thought on persecution and tolerance
    - Role of Christianity in civilization
  - Spread of Christianity
- Criticism of Islam
- Criticism of Israel
- Criticism of Judaism
- Criticism of religion
- History of Islam
  - Islam and violence
  - Spread of Islam
- Islam and other religions
  - Christianity and Islam
  - Islamic–Jewish relations
  - Muslim supporters of Israel
- Islamophobia
  - Anti-Shi'ism
  - Anti-Sunnism
  - Persecution of Muslims
    - Persecution of minority Muslim groups
    - Sectarian violence among Muslims
- History of religion
- Jewish history
- Jewish religious movements
- Jewish schisms
- Jewish views on religious pluralism
- Judaism and violence
- Persecution of early Christians by the Jews
- Persecution of Jews
- History of Zionism
- History of Israel
