= Paula Fredriksen =

American historian (born 1951)

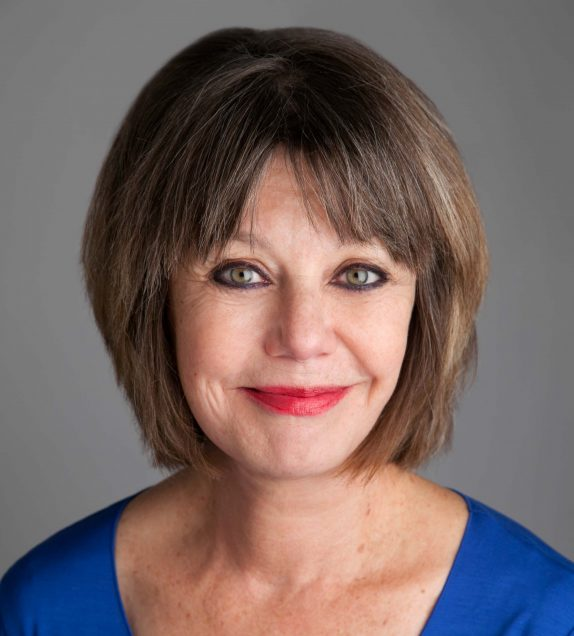
- Born: January 6, 1951 (age 75); Kingston, Rhode Island, US
- Citizenship: United States
- Spouse: Alfred I. Tauber
- Awards: Elected Fellow of the American Academy of Arts and Sciences (2013); Prose Award for Best Book in Religion (2018)

Academic background
- Education: B.A., Religion and History, Wellesley College; Diploma in Theology, University of Oxford; Ph.D., History of Religion, Princeton University

Academic work
- Discipline: Historian, scholar of early Christianity
- Institutions: Boston University; Hebrew University of Jerusalem; Stanford University; University of California, Berkeley; University of Pittsburgh; Princeton University
- Main interests: History of Christianity, Second Temple Judaism, Jesus of Nazareth, Paul the Apostle, Augustine of Hippo
- Notable works: From Jesus to Christ: The Origins of the Early Images of Jesus; Jesus of Nazareth, King of the Jews; Augustine on Romans; Augustine and the Jews; Paul: The Pagans' Apostle; Ancient Christianities: The First Five Hundred Years

Paula Fredriksen (born January 6, 1951, Kingston, Rhode Island) is an American historian and scholar of early Christianity. She held the position of William Goodwin Aurelio Professor of Scripture at Boston University from 1990 to 2010. Now emerita, Fredriksen served as Distinguished Visiting Professor in the Department of Comparative Religion at the Hebrew University of Jerusalem from 2009 to 2020.

Fredriksen specializes in the history of Christianity, tracing its development from its roots in an apocalyptic, messianic sect within Second Temple Judaism to its evolution into an extension of the Late Roman imperial government and its strengthening in the post-Roman West, from the 1st to the 7th centuries CE. She works to reconstruct the many ways that various ancient Mediterranean peoples—pagans, Jews and Christians—interacted with the many special social agents (e.g., high Gods, apocalyptic forces, heavenly bodies, godlings, spirits, and divine humans) that populated both the ancient flat-disced Earth and geocentric universe.

Fredriksen served as an historical consultant and featured speaker in many media, including for the BBC production The Lives of Jesus (1996) and for U.S. News & World Report's "The Life and Times of Jesus". Fredriksen's book From Jesus to Christ: The Origins of the Early Images of Jesus served as a template for the Frontline documentary From Jesus to Christ: The First Christians.

Fredriksen was elected to the American Academy of Arts and Sciences in 2013. In 2026, she gave the six Gifford Lectures in natural theology at the University of Edinburgh on "The Conversions of Christianity."

== Education ==
Fredriksen studied for a double B.A. in Religion and History at Wellesley College. She later recalled entering Wellesley in 1969 just after the college dropped its longstanding Bible requirement, a change that left a large biblical studies faculty with fewer students and helped draw her into the field. She graduated Phi Beta Kappa from Wellesley in 1973. After a year of formal theological study at St Hilda's College, Oxford, she received a diploma in theology from the University of Oxford in 1974.

Fredriksen earned her Ph.D. in the history of religion from Princeton University in 1979. From fall 1979 to 1980, she was an Andrew W. Mellon Postdoctoral Fellow in the Religion Department at Stanford University. Both Wellesley College (in 1989) and Princeton University (in 2000) deemed Fredriksen a "distinguished alumna".

== Career ==
Fredriksen began her career as a lecturer at the Department of Religion of Princeton University in 1978. From 1979 to 1980, she was a faculty member at the department of religious studies at Stanford University. She relocated to the University of California, Berkeley where, from 1980 to 1986, she was an assistant professor in the department of history and, from 1986 to 1989, worked as an associate professor in the department of religious studies of the University of Pittsburgh.

From 1990 to 2010, Fredriksen was the William Goodwin Aurelio Professor of Scripture at Boston University. Now emerita, Fredriksen served as Distinguished Visiting Professor of Comparative Religion at the Hebrew University from 2009 to 2020. In April 2013, she was elected a fellow of the American Academy of Arts & Sciences (AAAS).

She holds honorary doctorates from Iona College (2008), Lund University in Sweden (2017), and the Hebrew University of Jerusalem (2018).

== Personal life ==
Fredriksen was born in Rhode Island. She was raised in a Roman Catholic family of mixed Sicilian and Norwegian background. Her maternal grandmother had immigrated from Sicily in the 1890s, while her surname comes from her Norwegian father, whom she described as nonreligious.

While a graduate student, Fredriksen decided to convert to Orthodox Judaism. She later recalled studying with a rabbi at Stanford and, later, with another rabbi in Berkeley during that period.

== Scholarship ==
=== Jesus ===
Fredriksen views early Christianity from two vantage points: that of late Second Temple Judaism (roughly 200 BCE to 70 CE) and that of the late Greek East and Latin West (especially from the late fourth to the mid-fifth century CE). For the entire spread of these centuries, Fredriksen says, the vast majority of people worshiped their own particular gods—a great variety of cults and customs lumped together by scholarly convention as "paganism". Fredriksen emphasizes that different forms of Judaism developed within the larger matrix of Graeco-Roman paganism and that different forms of Christianity developed within different types of Judaism and paganism. Context affects content: all these cultures mutually influenced each other.

Late Second Temple Judaism, whether in the Jewish homeland (Hebrew: אֶרֶץ יִשְׂרָאֵל, romanized: Éretz Yisra'él, lit. 'Land of Israel') or in the diaspora, provided the cradle of the early Jesus-movements. Two figures dominate their development and thus Fredriksen's research of the period: that of Jesus of Nazareth and that of Paul the Apostle Despite the many cultural and social differences distinguishing Jesus and Paul—language (Aramaic/Greek), location (Jewish territories and Jerusalem/diaspora) and audiences (Jews/pagans)—these two men stood united in a single conviction. Both taught that the God of Israel would overwhelm evil, raise the dead, and establish his reign of eternal peace and justice within their own lifetimes. In short, in line with the work of Albert Schweitzer (for Jesus and for Paul) and of Krister Stendahl (for Paul), Fredriksen holds that both Jesus and Paul were apocalyptic thinkers.

In From Jesus to Christ, Fredriksen examined the images of Jesus presented in the Pauline epistles and the four gospels as they were modified and adapted once the movement started spreading abroad in the diaspora and outgrew its original prophecy: proclaimed by the author of the gospel of Mark as "the Kingdom of God is at hand!" In Jesus of Nazareth, King of the Jews, she concentrated instead on reconstructing the historical figure himself. Turning to the chronology of John's gospel (wherein Jesus has a three-year mission, centered in Jerusalem), rather than that of Mark, Matthew and Luke (which locate Jesus primarily in Galilee, with a single, and fatal, trip to Jerusalem), Fredriksen answered the question why Jesus was crucified but his followers were not. Pontius Pilate and the priests (כֹּהֲנִים, kōhănīm; sing. כֹּהֵן, kohen) at the time were familiar with Jesus's apocalyptic message—God, not human armies, would establish his Kingdom—and so knew that Jesus was, in every practical way, politically and militarily harmless.

But on what proved to be his final trip to the city for Passover, crowds of the pilgrim-swollen town began proclaiming Jesus as messiah. This was cause for alarm, for, as Josephus wrote, it was "on these festive occasions that sedition is most apt to break out." Working in concert with the temple police (John 18:3), Pilate arrested Jesus and crucified him as "King of the Jews", disabusing the crowds of their enthusiasm. It was the crowds, not Jesus himself, Fredriksen concludes, who threatened the city's stability. This theory explains as well why the original community could resettle permanently in Jerusalem, largely without incident, for the remaining four decades of the city's lifetime.

=== Paul ===
Fredriksen's many articles on Paul and his cameo appearances in her books on Jesus and Augustine of Hippo come together in her book Paul: The Pagans' Apostle. Fredriksen explains there that Paul lived in a world full of gods. As Jesus's apostle, Paul taught that pagans did not have to become Jews (for men, meaning circumcision). But they did have to commit to worshiping Israel's god alone, he insisted, and to live according to some—not all—Jewish law (הֲלָכָה, Halakha, 'the way').

Following especially the broad lines of interpretation laid down by Albert Schweitzer and by Krister Stendahl, Fredriksen asserts that Paul believed that he lived and worked in history's final hour. Paul was convinced that he knew the time on God's clock because of his experience of the resurrected Jesus: resurrection itself, according to apocalyptic Jewish convictions, would signal the end of time. In the brief meanwhile, between Jesus's first and final advents, Paul worked to turn pagans from their gods to his god.

Paul's seven undisputed letters date to the 50s of the first century CE. They are the only evidence of the Jesus movement that predates the Roman destruction of the Second Temple in 70 CE. But Jesus died around the year 30 CE. This passage of time after the death of Jesus, according to Fredriksen, means that by the time the earliest stratum of tradition appears—namely, in Paul's letters—the Kingdom of God was already late. In the Jewish diaspora, the movement fractured into competing missions over the question of how to integrate ex-pagan gentiles into its communities. Some apostles taught that ex-pagan males needed to enter Israel's covenant with God through circumcision (that is, full conversion to Judaism). Paul furiously disagreed, Fredriksen emphasizes. Against his circumcising competitors, he argued that the presence of Jesus's spirit or of the holy spirit within these gentile communities attested to their "adoption" into God's family: Jesus-following ex-pagans, insists Paul, are now Israel's brothers" (adelphoi), adopted via Jesus into the family of Abraham.

Paul thought not that gentiles should not become Jews, but that they could not become Jews: covenantal circumcision, he insisted, occurs only on the eighth day of the male infant's life (Philippians 3:5). Jewish circumcision for adult gentile males, in view of Jewish law, was thus "nothing" (1 Corinthians 7:19). His letters, all addressed to gentile communities, argue vehemently against his circumcising competitors. By the late first or early second century, that generation being long dead, Paul's intra-Jewish arguments will be interpreted by gentile readers as anti-Jewish arguments. In this way, Fredriksen shows, Paul's letters became a wellspring for nineteen centuries of Christian anti-Judaism and antisemitism.

Fredriksen thus contributes to a new school of New Testament scholarship known as "Paul within Judaism". Believing that the Kingdom would arrive in his own lifetime, Paul had no intention of starting a new religion, much less an anti-Jewish religion. But Paul does acknowledge the existence "of many gods and many lords" (1 Corinthians 8:5; "lord" is a common designation for a Mediterranean god): they are Jesus's cosmic opposition. Paul, thus, should be understood not only within Judaism, urges Fredriksen. As a late Second Temple diaspora Jew, the apocalyptic Paul also stands "within paganism". It was these pagan superhuman powers, taught Paul, whom Jesus would defeat when he returned in glory as God's Davidic champion.

=== Augustine ===
Through Krister Stendahl's classic article "Paul and the Introspective Conscience of the West", Fredriksen first made the acquaintance of the mid-first century Paul and of Paul's greatest Western interpreter, Augustine of Hippo. Augustine's Paul, in late Latin translation, was the source of Augustine's signature teachings on human will, divine grace, original sin, and predestination. As he struggled particularly with Paul's epistle to the Romans, Augustine redefined "free will". Human moral agency, he now argued, was in a state of diminished capacity, which was the just penalty of Adam's sin, inherited across generations. In Augustine on Romans (1982), the first English translation of two of his early works on Paul's epistle, Fredriksen charted Augustine's evolving struggles with this nexus of issues. These commentaries on Romans were the prelude to Augustine's masterwork, the Confessions.

Fredriksen continued to consider and contrast the first-century Jewish Paul and the late fourth-century Augustinian Paul. She compared scholarly assessments of their respective conversions. She analyzed both men's ideas on flesh and resurrection. She measured the distance between their respective ideas on the destiny of Israel. She traced Augustine's weaponization of Paul against Pelagius. She explored the similarities and differences between them on such issues as sin, salvation, and God. Fredriksen also brought Augustine into conversation with other ancient theologians: with Ticonius (on Christian millenarianism); with Origen (on Paul and Halakha; on sin and salvation); and with Isidore of Seville (on Jews).

Augustine surprised Fredriksen, however, once she began to investigate how the idea of "Jews" shaped his theology. By Augustine's lifetime (354–430 CE), Jews had long figured as the negative contrast to gentile Christianity. Indeed, Augustine himself deployed standard anti-Jewish rhetoric against his Christian rivals, the Donatists: Jews might be bad, but the Donatists, he observed, were even worse. But against the anti-Judaism of his former religion, Manichaeism, Augustine thought outside the box. He taught that Jesus, the original apostles, and Paul himself, even after Damascus, had all continued to live according to the Jewish interpretation of Jewish law. The Jews' continuing existence, he insisted, was of benefit to the church because, through them, the texts of the Bible had penetrated the known world. Most dramatically, Augustine urged that the Jews had no less a protector than God himself, who would punish any ruler, whether pagan or Christian, who tried to inhibit them from living Jewish lives. In advocating for a historical understanding of Christianity, in other words, Augustine framed, as well, a principled Christian theological defense of Jews and of Judaism. Dismally negative as his traditional anti-Jewish rhetoric was, his positive ideology, Fredriksen concludes, was original, daring, and unique. Augustine's singular teaching would survive the collapse of the western Roman Empire, ultimately saving Jewish lives in the course of medieval crusades.

In The Next Quest for the Historical Jesus, Fredriksen credited Augustine and the Manichean bishop Faustus with constructing a Historical Jesus over a millennium before the Enlightenment Quest.

== Publications ==
In 1982, Fredriksen published Augustine on Romans, a Latin edition with facing translation of Augustine's two early efforts with Paul's epistle to the Romans. These two exercises in biblical interpretation prepared Augustine, within four years, to frame his signature masterpiece, the Confessions.

In 1988, Fredriksen published From Jesus to Christ, which traces the first-century growth of various images of Jesus. The book won the 1988 Yale University Press Governors' Award for Best Book.

In 1999, Fredriksen published Jesus of Nazareth, King of the Jews on the historical Jesus. The book won a National Jewish Book Award. In 2000, Boston University named it a best faculty book.

In 2004 she published a critical review of the Mel Gibson film The Passion of the Christ, which she expanded upon in her 2006 book On 'The Passion of the Christ': Exploring the Issues Raised by the Controversial Movie.

In 2008, Fredriksen published Augustine and the Jews (second edition Yale 2010), which situates Augustine's teachings about Jews and Judaism within their contemporary context of Christian anti-Judaism and the imperial church's exercise of coercive force against religious minorities.

In 2012, Fredriksen published Sin: The Early History of an Idea, which explored how views of humanity and God changed over the centuries between John the Baptist and Augustine of Hippo. The book was based on Fredriksen's 2007 Spencer Trask lectures at Princeton.

In 2017, Fredriksen published Paul: The Pagan's Apostle, which situates Paul within, not against, his native Judaism. In 2018, the book won the Prose Award for best book in religion from the American Publisher's Association.

In 2018, Fredriksen published When Christians Were Jews, in which she argued for the Jewish, apocalyptic convictions of the original Christ-community in Jerusalem, the founding generation – which was convinced that it was history's final generation.

Christian antisemitism in both its academic forms and in its popular ones led to two of Fredriksen's anthologies, Jesus, Judaism, and Christian Anti-Judaism: Reading the New Testament After the Holocaust (with Adele Reinhartz; 2002) and On 'The Passion of the Christ' (2004; 2005, on Mel Gibson's film), as well as to her appreciation of David Nirenberg's foundational work on the same theme. Her 2020 Shaffer Lectures at Yale, "Paul's Letters, Christian Identity, and Thinking with Jews", explored the way that anti-Judaism, in various modalities, continues to inflect the work of contemporary scholars of New Testament Studies.

Together with Jesper Svartvik, she organized and edited Krister Among the Jews and Gentiles: Essays in Appreciation of the Life and Work of Krister Stendahl (2018), to whom she also dedicated her book on Paul.

Fredriksen's book Ancient Christianities: The First Five Hundred Years was published by Princeton University Press in 2024.
