= Judenhass =

Judenhass (German for "Jew-hatred", lit. 'Jewish hate') may refer to:

- Antisemitism, religious, economic, racial, political, or cultural hostility, prejudice, or discrimination against Jews
- Anti-Judaism, total or partial opposition to Judaism
- Judenhass (comics), a 2008 comic book by Dave Sim
