= Persecution of Christians in the New Testament =

The persecution of Christians in the New Testament is an important part of the Early Christian narrative which depicts the early church as being persecuted for their heterodox beliefs by a Jewish establishment in the Roman province of Judaea. The New Testament, especially the Gospel of John, has traditionally been interpreted as relating Christian accounts of the Pharisee rejection of Jesus and accusations of the Pharisee responsibility for his crucifixion. The Acts of the Apostles depicts instances of early Christian persecution by the Sanhedrin, the Jewish religious court.

Walter Laqueur argues that hostility between Christians and Jews grew over the generations. By the 4th century, John Chrysostom was arguing that the Pharisees alone, not the Romans, were responsible for the murder of Christ. However, according to Laqueur: "Absolving Pilate from guilt may have been connected with the missionary activities of early Christianity in Rome and the desire not to antagonize those they want to convert."

== Basic context ==
This account of persecution is part of a general theme of anti-Christian persecution by both Romans and Jews, one that starts with the Pharisee rejection of Jesus's ministry, the cleansing of the Temple, and continues on with his trial before the High Priest, his crucifixion, and the Pharisees' refusal to accept him as the Jewish messiah. This theme plays a significant part in several Christian doctrines ranging from the release of Christians from obeying the Old Testament Law to the commandment to preach to "all nations" (meaning to gentiles as well as Jews) to the concepts of supersessionism.

== Depictions in Luke–Acts ==
Luke–Acts contains numerous references to and episodes of persecution against Christians, carried out primarily by Jews and Roman authorities. As historiography, the scholarly consensus is that Luke–Acts presents a skewed picture of the hardships faced by the early church. While evidence for isolated incidents has been found, there exists no historical evidence for systematic persecution of early Christians by either Jews or the Romans. during the period Luke–Acts was likely composed. The alleged historical unreliability of Luke-Acts has not, however, prevented scholars from asking what purpose persecution serves in the narrative and what Luke–Acts' presentation of persecution suggests about the author's motivations. Possible explanations for the purpose of persecution in Luke–Acts have included: to portray Christianity as a non-threat to the Romans by contrasting the movement with a disruptive Jewish community; to craft a polemic to discredit critics of Christianity; and to provide encouragement in times of hardship.

=== Gospel of Luke ===
The Gospel of Luke contains a few explicit examples of persecution against Christians. There are several passages that mention coming difficulties for Jesus' followers and Jerusalem, which scholars believe foreshadow the hardships Christians will face in Acts. For instance, while Matthew (13:53-58) and Mark (6:1-6) have versions of the rejection of Jesus in his hometown, Luke (4:14-30) devotes much more time to the episode than the other gospels. S. G. Wilson suggests that this might give a glimpse of later persecution by Jews and rejection of the Jewish mission for a gentile mission in Acts (13:46). In Luke, Jesus speaks of "people [who] hate" and "defame you on account of the Son of Man" and likens his followers' suffering to that of earlier prophets (6:22-23 NRSV). Jesus later says to "not fear those who kill the body and after that can do nothing more" (12:4 NRSV).

The major exception to these less direct references to persecution is the Passion narrative in 22:1-23:56. Jewish chief priests and scribes plot to kill Jesus (22:1-6), arrest him (22:47-52), question him before the Sanhedrin and then take him to the Roman prefect Pontius Pilate (22:66-23:1). Jesus is questioned by Pilate (23:3-5), "Herod" (believed to be Agrippa I) (23:6-12), sentenced to death (23:21-25), crucified, died, and buried (23:26-56). Luke's depiction of Pilate is thought by scholars to be key to understanding the author of Luke–Acts' opinion of the Roman Empire.

=== Acts of the Apostles ===
The Acts of the Apostles, which tells the story of the early Christian church, contains a multitude of episodes highlighting persecution. The majority of these conflicts occur between Christians and Jews, though there are examples of persecution by gentiles (such as the diviner-slave's owners in 16:16-24) and Romans (28:16). While Kelhoffer and Wilson have argued there is a purposeful pattern of Jewish-led persecution in Luke–Acts, there is significant doubt over how historically accurate Luke–Acts' portrayal of Christian-Jewish relations is and how wide reaching (whether directed at specific Jewish groups or 'Jews' as a whole) and seriously this polemic was meant be taken.

The Roman court system features heavily in the later chapters when Saint Paul is brought to trial before several different officials. Paul is tried through the procedure of cognitio extra ordinem, wherein the Roman magistrate participates in all parts of the trial, from evidence gathering to inquisition to judgment. A similar system can be seen in Pliny the Younger's letter 10.96

- 4:3-22, 5:17-42: Peter and John are arrested by Sadducees, questioned by the Sanhedrin, and flogged (5:40 only).
- 6:8-8:1: Stephen is arrested by "the people...the elders and the scribes" (6:12 NRSV), questioned before the Sanhedrin, and stoned to death, sparking a "severe persecution against the church in Jerusalem" (8:1).
- 8:3, 9:2: Saul (whose Roman name was Paul) imprisons many Christians.
- 9:23-24, 20:19, 23:12-14: Jews plot to kill Paul.
- 12:1-5: King Herod (believed to be Agrippa I) executes James and imprisons Peter.
- 13:44-51: Paul and Barnabas being driven out of Antioch.
- 14:5-6: Jews and gentiles attempt unsuccessfully to stone Paul and Barnabas.
- 14:19-20: Jews stone Paul nearly to death.
- 16:16-24: Paul and Silas are flogged and imprisoned by gentiles in Philippi.
- 17:1-15: Paul and others are chased out of successive towns by Jews.
- 18:12-17: Paul is made to appear before the Roman proconsul Gallop in Achaia, who dismisses the case as an internal dispute.
- 19:23-41: Worshippers of Artemis in Ephesus riot against Paul and his companions, but they are not harmed.
- 21:27-28:30: In his final journey to Rome, Paul is taken by Jews in Jerusalem to be killed but is rescued by Roman soldiers who imprison him. He testifies before the Sanhedrin (22:30-23:11) and the governor Antonius Felix at Caesarea (24:1-27) before using his status as a Roman citizen (22:29) to have his case heard by the emperor.

=== Opinions of Romans and Jews ===
While evidence has been offered both to argue Luke–Acts' positive view of the Roman Empire and the opposite, scholars tend to see Luke–Acts as pro-Roman and analyze it as though it was written with a Roman (though not exclusively) audience in mind. Larger Lukan themes like the Gentile mission, which sought to spread Christianity beyond the Jewish diaspora, support this reading.

Even as scholars point to passages sympathetic to Jews, there is wide agreement that a strong anti-Jewish streak runs through Luke–Acts, even if it is not always consistent. Because these passages have been used throughout history to justify antisemitism, scholars like Luke T. Johnson have attempted to nuance the portrayal of the Jews both by presenting a less homogenous dichotomy of 'Christians' versus 'Jews' and by contextualizing the polemics within the rhetoric of contemporaneous philosophical debate, showing how rival schools of thought routinely insulted and slandered their opponents.

These attacks were formulaic and stereotyped, crafted to define who was the enemy in the debates, but not used with the expectation that their insults and accusations would be taken literally, as they would be centuries later. Furthermore, Luke–Acts certainly holds Jewish texts in high regard, repeatedly referencing them in relation to Jesus and others, casting doubt on interpretations that Luke–Acts is trying to completely divorce itself from its Jewish heritage.

=== Interpretations ===
If Luke–Acts is not an accurate catalog of every Christian persecution during the first century, scholars have offered a variety of interpretative frameworks to understand what motivated the author of the books and how the author uses persecution to argue their claims. These interpretations include:

==== Contrasting Jews and Christians ====
S. G. Wilson has argued that Luke–Acts was composed to portray Christianity as a more peaceable form of Judaism to the books' (in part) Roman audience. He points to Luke–Acts' deep reverence for and reliance on Jewish scripture to legitimate Jesus and the mission of the church (cf. Luke 3:4-6, Acts2:17-21) as evidence for the author's continued connection to Jewish heritage, even as the author sees as Christianity's future goal to spread to the Gentiles. Wilson argues that in Acts, Jews are depicted as repeatedly stirring up trouble for both Christians and Roman authorities (cf. 17:6-7, 18:13, 24:12-13), and the accused Christians are repeatedly found innocent by the Roman authorities, often by showing how they upheld both Roman and Jewish laws (cf. 23:6, 24:14-21, 26:23, 28:20) and were, therefore, morally superior to their accusers.

==== Rhetorical weapon against critics ====
Kelhoffer spends part of his book Persecution, Persuasion and Power arguing that persecution in Luke–Acts is used by the author to accomplish three things: (1) question the legitimacy of the accusers, (2) confirm the legitimacy of the faithful accused, and (3) derive legitimacy for the author's Gentile audience who might be suffering their own persecution. For example, in the story of Stephen's martyrdom, Stephen links his accusers to those who resisted Moses (Acts 7:51-53), and his death is paralleled with Jesus' (Acts 7:59-60). Acts 28:25-28 also provides strong encouragement and validation for Gentiles readers, while Acts 9:4-5 makes a direct link between the persecuted and Jesus, which further indicts any critics or persecutors of Christianity. Kelhoffer sees the author of Luke–Acts as turning the dishonor of persecution into an honor, placing those who suffer "on account of the Son of Man" (Luke 6:22 NSRV) in the legacy of Old Testament and Israelite salvation history.

==== Encouragement ====
Robert Maddox interprets Paul's experiences in Luke–Acts as the model example for its audience, not only as a devout believer but also as one who suffers repeated persecution. Passages like Luke 12:4-7 and Acts 14:22 are read by Maddox as warning Christians of the hardships they will face. Evidence for the deep value early Christians put on persecution may also be found in Acts 5:41 and Acts 8:1-4 (which states that even as Christians were persecuted, they spread the word). Additionally, in Luke 6:26, 40, Jesus speaks of coming hardship not just for himself, but for his followers. Touching on a theme that will be later explored more fully by Stephen in his final speech in Acts (7:1-53), Jesus and his followers are likened to the Jewish prophets of old, who were rejected by the Israelites despite being sent by God. Therefore, to follow Jesus is to suffer greatly as he will later in Luke. Through his crucifixion Jesus becomes the most important and potent example of suffering for which every Christian must prepare; those who do will be justly rewarded (Luke 6:22-23).

== Elsewhere in the New Testament ==
=== Gospel of Mark ===
The Gospel of Mark was probably written after the destruction of the temple in Jerusalem in 70 AD and contains multiple references to persecution of Christians. There is a great deal of argument in the scholarly community about to whom it is addressed. When looking at persecution in this text, it should be remembered that the provinces were largely autonomous and that the governors had legal control under cognitio extra ordinem, meaning that while there was no empire-wide persecution when Mark was written, it is possible that Christians were being executed in various provinces. It is also important to realize that there was probably persecution of Christians, especially Jewish Christians by Jews because they were seen as disturbing the peace, which could lead to retribution by the Romans.

=== Galatians ===
In his Epistle to the Galatians, Paul indicates several times that the Jews have persecuted Christians, beginning with his admission of his own persecution of the Christians prior to his conversion (Gal 4:29) and ending with his suggestion that he is presently being persecuted because he no longer preaches circumcision (Gal 5:11). This may be one of the stronger proofs of such persecution, as Paul's admission of guilt would be foolish if there were not actually a widespread persecution of Christians by Jews. Few people seeking converts to their cause would do so by falsely admitting to a crime.

=== 2nd Corinthians ===
In the Second Epistle to the Corinthians, Paul asserts that he had been persecuted by the Jews on numerous occasions:

...I have worked much harder, been in prison more frequently, been flogged more severely, and been exposed to death again and again. Five times I received from the Jews the forty lashes minus one. Three times I was beaten with rods, once I was stoned, three times I was shipwrecked, I spent a night and a day in the open sea, I have been constantly on the move. I have been in danger from rivers, in danger from bandits, in danger from my own countrymen, in danger from Gentiles; in danger in the city, in danger in the country, in danger at sea; and in danger from false brothers.

— 2 Cor 11:23–26 NIV

Historian Paula Fredriksen treats these passages as evidence for what Paul himself meant by "persecution" when he speaks of his own persecution of Christ assemblies (which she interprets as Jewish followers of Christ) before his own conversion. She turns to Paul's own list of sufferings and suggests that his earlier "persecution" may have been the same kind of thing he later says he received: synagogue disciplinary flogging, "up to the permitted maximum of thirty-nine blows." She contrasts this with Acts, which dramatizes Paul as involved in the imprisonment and killing of others, and says that Paul himself "nowhere mentions imprisoning anyone, much less murdering them."

Fredriksen argues that Paul's own presentation of his many sufferings shows that the agents of his troubles came from varied backgrounds. The passages in 2 Corinthians relate to synagogue authorities, Roman magistrates, possible pagan mob violence, robbers, "my own people" (Jews), "pagans," and rival Christ-followers ("false brothers"). She explains this hostility in light of Paul's gentile mission. On her reading, the problem was that Paul urged gentiles to stop honoring their native gods and worship the God of Israel alone. That, she argues, threatened the balance between gods and cities: pagans would resent him because abandoning the gods was socially and religiously disruptive, and Roman magistrates would also intervene. It also distanced diaspora synagogues, which had long accommodated gentile sympathizers to Judaism (or "God-Fearers"), without requiring them to abandon their own gods. For that reason, she says Paul's demand "destabilized" the synagogue's position in pagan cities.

=== Revelation ===
Leonard L. Thompson argues that the Book of Revelation was written during the reign of Domitian (81–96 AD). From the middle down to the last quarter of the first century, extensive persecutions were carried out throughout the Roman Empire, although they were sporadic. Most were initiated by local governors, who were expected to keep their cities pacate atque quita ("settled and orderly"). As pressure from the demands of the citizens to get rid of the Christians became harder to ignore or control, they were driven to acquiesce.

The author, John, found himself "...on the island of Patmos because of the word of God and the testimony of Jesus" (Rev. 1:9 NRSV), and it was there that he wrote the Book of Revelation. In several of his messages addressed to the Seven churches of Asia, John makes references to past and future times of persecution, trial and death, and calls upon their endurance and faith.

In his letter to Ephesus, he writes:

" I know your works, your toil and your patient endurance... I also know that you are enduring patiently and bearing up for the sake of my name..." (2:2-3 NRSV). To Smyrna:
"I know of your affliction and your poverty...  Do not fear what you are about to suffer. Beware, the devil is about to throw some of you into prison so that you may be tested... Be faithful until death, and I will give you the crown of life" (2:9-10 NRSV). And to Pergamum:
"I know where you are living, where Satan's throne is. Yet you are holding fast to my name, and you did not deny your faith in me even in the days of Antipas my witness, my faithful one, who was killed among you, where Satan lives" (2:13 NRSV).

There are also passages in which John refers to martyrs. Revelation 6:9-11 and 20:4 seem to indicate that many Christians were tortured and killed for their beliefs, and, in his vision, they "...cried out with a loud voice, 'Sovereign Lord...how long will it be before you judge and avenge our blood on the inhabitants of the earth?'" (6:10 NRSV). John portrays the Roman Empire—called "the great whore Babylon"—as "being drunk with the blood of the saints and the blood of the witnesses to Jesus" (17:6 NRSV). The Book of Revelation progresses with the wrath of God poured upon the Earth as retribution for the sufferings of the faithful Christians. It ends with the Fall of Babylon and Christ's defeat of Satan, after which there are "a new heaven and a new earth" (21:1 NRSV).

== Basis in sectarian conflict ==
One perspective holds that the earliest examples of Jewish persecution of Christians are actually examples of sectarian conflict, or Jews persecuting other Jews. Prior to the destruction of the Temple, Judaism was extremely heterodox; after the destruction of the Temple in AD 70, early Christians and Pharisees (the Second Temple group that would become Rabbinic Judaism) vied for influence among Jews.

According to Douglas R. A. Hare, "it has long been recognized that in the Gospel according to St. Matthew the conflict between Jesus and the Pharisees has been intensified and it has often been suggested that this intensification reflects the continued struggle between the Church and the synagogue." Hare asserts that prior to the first revolt, Jewish persecution of Christians was more frequently directed at Christian missionaries to synagogues in the Jewish diaspora than against the church in Jerusalem. Organized opposition to Christianity appeared during the first revolt (when nationalist sentiment was high) and after it (when Pharisaic dominance of the synagogue was established). Few Christians were martyred prior to the Bar Kokhba revolt. Most of those who were killed were victims of mob violence rather than official action. None were executed for purely religious reasons although individual missionaries were banned, detained and flogged for breach of the peace. According to Hare, the numerous New Testament references to persecution reflect early Christian expectations of persecution based perhaps on the pre-Christian "conviction that the Jews had always persecuted the messengers of God".

G. Fox asserts that Jewish persecution of the followers of Jesus started only when Christianity started spreading among Gentiles and when the Jews realized the separation between themselves and Christians. Paul E. Davies states that the violent persecuting zeal displayed by some Jews sharpened the criticisms of the Jews in the Gospels as they were written. Fox argues that the hostile utterances of rabbis were towards those Christians who did not support Bar Kokhba and was due to anti-Jewish feelings which were caused by Gentile converts to Christianity. This however is controversial as only certain segments of the community ever accepted Bar Kokhba as the messiah, while many rabbis scorned such a proposition. Fox also argues that the persecution accusations and stories of early Christians martrydom are exaggerated by the Church. He asserts that it is unhistorical to assume that the matrydom of Stephen was representative of a widespread persecution of Christians because events of this nature were not uncommon in that time. In support of this assertion, Fox argues that thousands of Jews were killed by Romans and it was not something novel. Thus the persecution hardly started before 70 AD, and when it was started by Bar Kokhba, it was not on purely theological grounds but also because of the disloyalty of Christians in the rebellion against the Romans.

Claudia Setzer draws a distinction between Jews and Christians (both Jewish and Gentile) as to when the perception of Christianity as a Jewish sect was replaced by an understanding of Christianity as a new and separate religion. Setzer asserts that, "Jews did not see Christians as clearly separate from their own community until at least the middle of the second century." By contrast, "almost from the outset Christians have a consciousness of themselves as distinct from other Jews." Thus, acts of Jewish persecution of Christians fall within the boundaries of synagogue discipline and were so perceived by Jews acting and thinking as the established community. The Christians, on the other hand, being a new movement, worked out their identity in contrast and opposition to the Jewish community and saw themselves as persecuted rather than "disciplined."

According to Paula Fredriksen, in From Jesus to Christ, the reason was that Jewish Christians were preaching the imminent return of the King of the Jews and the establishment of his kingdom. To Roman ears, such talk was seditious. Romans gave Jews at that time limited self-rule; the main obligations of Jewish leaders were to collect taxes for Rome and to maintain civil order. Thus, Jewish leaders would have to suppress any seditious talk. In cases where Jewish leaders did not suppress seditious talk, they were often sent to Rome for trial and execution, or in the cases of Herod Archelaus and Herod Antipas merely deposed and exiled to Gaul.

== See also ==
- Acta Sanctorum
- Anti-Judaism in early Christianity
- Christianity and Judaism
- Antisemitism and the New Testament
- Catholic Church and Judaism
- Antisemitism in Christianity
- Christian–Jewish reconciliation
- Expounding of the Law#Love for enemies
