= Church of Jerusalem =

The Church of Jerusalem can refer to any of these sees or dioceses:

- Early Christianity#Jerusalem - the Jerusalem Church of the pre-Byzantine period
- Greek Orthodox Church of Jerusalem (5th century AD – present)
- Armenian Patriarchate of Jerusalem (638–present), the see of Oriental Orthodox Churches in Jerusalem
- Latin Patriarchate of Jerusalem (1099–1291 and 1847–present), the Latin Church Catholic patriarchal see in Jerusalem
- Anglican Diocese of Jerusalem (1841–present), the diocese of the Anglican Church in Jerusalem; see Anglican Bishop in Jerusalem
- Melkite Greek Catholic Church (1724–present), whose bishops carry the title of Patriarch of Antioch and All the East, of Alexandria and Jerusalem of the Melkite Greek Catholic Church

== See also ==
- Jerusalem church (disambiguation)
- Jerusalem in Christianity
- Church of the Holy Sepulchre
- Early centers of Christianity#Jerusalem
