= Jeanne Favret-Saada =

French ethnologist

- Born: 1934 (age 91–92); Sfax, French protectorate of Tunisia

Academic background
- Education: University of Paris

Academic work
- Discipline: Anthropology, Religious studies
- Sub-discipline: Ethnography of magic; Anthropology of therapy; Study of blasphemy
- Institutions: University of Algiers; University of Nanterre; École pratique des hautes études
- Notable works: Deadly Words, The Anti-Witch

Jeanne Favret-Saada, born in 1934 in Tunisia, is a French ethnologist.

== Biography ==
Favret-Saada was born in the Jewish community of Sfax in southern Tunisia. She studied philosophy in Paris, and then taught at the University of Algiers from 1959 to 1963. There, she studied political systems in Arab tribes and violence in Kabylie.

She then taught at Nanterre University in Paris, and later became Research Director at l'École pratique des hautes études (in religious studies).

== Research themes ==
She is particularly known for her work, in the 1970s, on peasant witchcraft in the Mayenne countryside. It results in a book, Deadly Words: Witchcraft in the Bocage (in 1977). She argues that since witchcraft resides in words, any ethnographic work of these practices require participation, and that witchcraft is one of the "contemporary discourses on misfortune and healing". She extends this work with Josée Contreras by studying psychoanalysis and outlining an anthropology of therapy. She continues working on this topic to this day, her last book, Anti-Witch, having been published in 2015.

== See also ==
- Antijudaism
