= Journal of Early Christian Studies =

- Discipline: Religion, classics
- Language: English
- Edited by: Ellen Muehlberger

Publication details
- History: 1993–present
- Publisher: Johns Hopkins University Press (United States)
- Frequency: Quarterly

Standard abbreviations
- ISO 4: J. Early Christ. Stud.

Indexing
- ISSN: 1067-6341 (print); 1086-3184 (web)
- OCLC no.: 33891207

Links
- Journal homepage; Online access

The Journal of Early Christian Studies is an academic journal founded in 1993 and is the official publication of the North American Patristics Society. It is devoted to the study of patristics, that is Christianity in the ancient period of roughly 100–700 C.E. The current editor is Ellen Muehlberger of The University of Michigan. The journal is published quarterly in March, June, September, and December by the Johns Hopkins University Press.

All articles submitted for review must be original work that makes a substantial scholarly contribution to the study of early Christianity 100-700 C.E. on the basis of wide engagement with the primary sources in the original languages and relevant scholarship on the topic in multiple languages.

The journal is abstracted and indexed in Arts and Humanities Citation Index, Current Contents/Arts & Humanities, MLA International Bibliography, and the Social Sciences Citation Index (partial coverage).

== See also ==
- Religion
- Early Christianity
- Patristics
