= Jerusalem church =

Jerusalem was the first center of the church, according to the Book of Acts, and according to the Catholic Encyclopedia the location of "the first Christian church".

Jerusalem church may refer to:

- History of early Christianity#Jerusalem church
- Council of Jerusalem
- Cenacle
- Church of the Holy Sepulchre
- Church of Jerusalem (disambiguation)
- Patriarch of Jerusalem (disambiguation)
- Patriarchate of Jerusalem (disambiguation)
- Jerusalem Church (Berlin)
- Jerusalem's Church, Copenhagen
