= Ellen Muehlberger =

American scholar

Ellen Muehlberger PhD
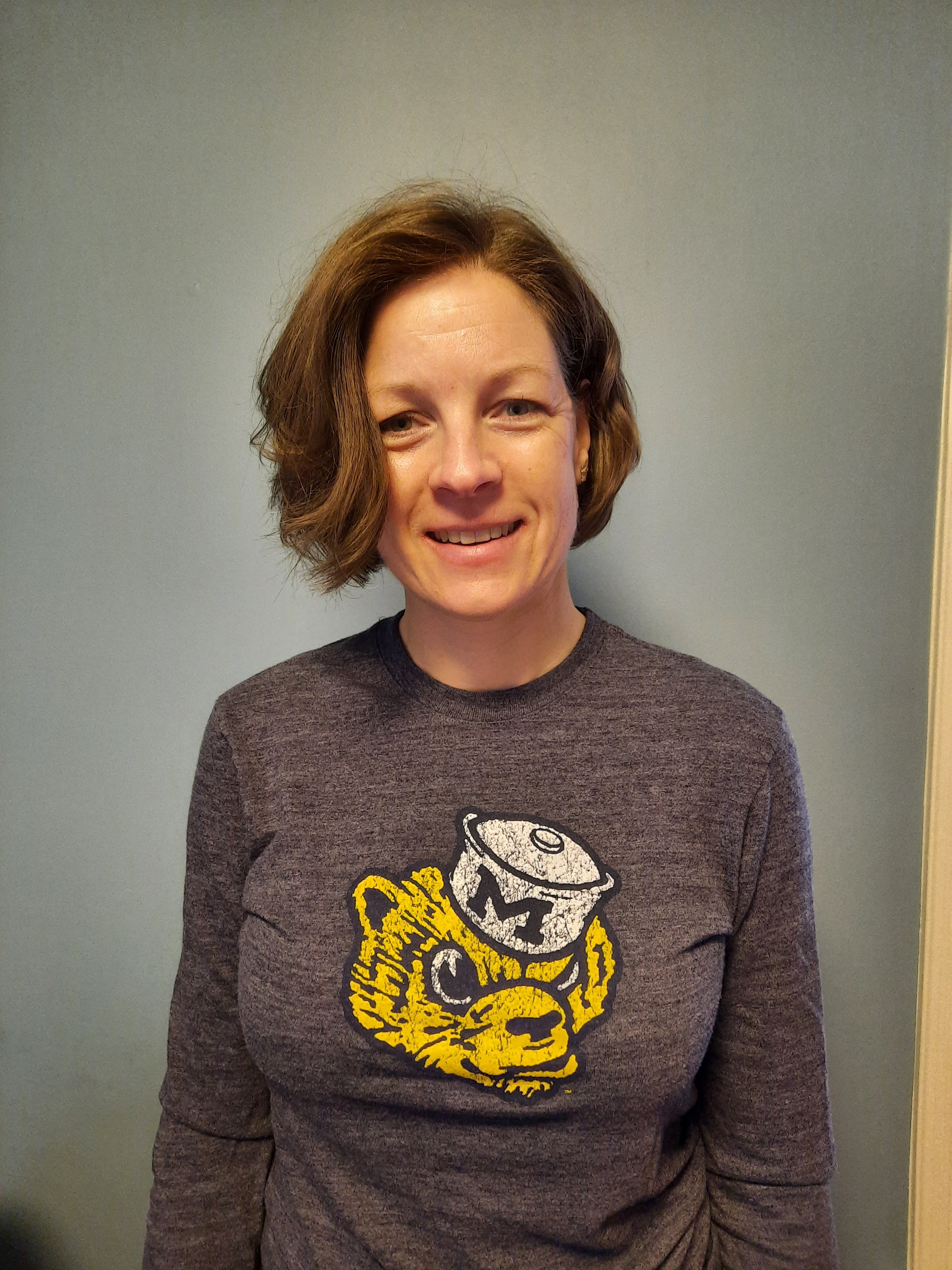
- Awards: National Endowment for the Humanities Fellowship (2016-2017), Charles A. Ryskamp Research Fellowship American Council of Learned Societies (2014-2015)

Academic background
- Education: Indiana University (MA, PhD) Western Michigan University (BA)
- Thesis: (2008)
- Doctoral advisor: David Brakke https://de.wikipedia.org/wiki/David_Brakke

Academic work
- Discipline: Early Christianity
- Sub-discipline: Armenian, Syriac, Greek, Hebrew, Latin
- Institutions: University of Michigan

Ellen Muehlberger is an American scholar of Christianity and late antiquity, and professor of history at the University of Michigan-Ann Arbor with appointments in classical studies and the Frankel Center for Judaic Studies. She is the current editor of the Journal of Early Christian Studies.

== Career ==
Muehlberger has taught at the University of Michigan since 2009. She was briefly a visiting assistant professor of Religious Studies at DePauw University. Her scholarship focuses on Christianity in late antiquity (300-700 C.E.) and examines specifically "rhetorical and historiographical methods Christians adopted as Christian culture shifted from being in the minority to being dominant in the later Roman Empire." She specializes in topics such as angels, notorious heretics and their deaths (e.g. Arius shows up on the list of people who died on the toilet) and has published on saintly women such as Macrina the Younger. She has also published extensively in the growing field of the study of Syriac Christianity.

== Scholarship and public engagement ==
=== Books ===
Muehlberger is a specialist in the late antique religious imagination. Her first book, Angels in Late Ancient Christianity, was published in 2013. A review in Bryn Mawr Classic Review noted that "Muehlberger succeeds in demonstrating that angels were an important source of lively speculation and contestation within fourth and early-fifth century Christian discourse. The book also reveals how discourse on angels can provide an entry into other aspects of Christianity, like conceptualizations of the liturgy." The book has been reviewed in such journals as Journal of Theological Studies, the American Historical Review, the Journal of Early Christian Studies, Horizons, and Marginalia Review of Books.

Muehlberger's second book, Moment of Reckoning: Imagined Death and Its Consequences in Late Ancient Christianity, was published in 2019 has also been well received. Another reviewer during a book panel published on Ancient Jew Review, remarked, "Muehlberger’s conclusions have significant implications for our research on the machine of narrative and ethics.

Her third book, titled Things Unseen: Essays on Evidence, Knowledge, and the Late Ancient World, was published in 2025 and is available open access from the University of California Press. Inspired by Ali Smith's Artful and Bram Stoker's Famous Impostors, the book imitates the genre of the published lecture series, taking its implicit authority to consider how both ancient and modern people generate and use evidence to create knowledge.

=== Select articles and editorial contributions ===
Muehlberger has also written numerous scholarly articles and chapters in collected volumes. She has edited The Cambridge Edition of Early Christian Writings and has served on the editorial boards of Studies of Late Antiquity, Bryn Mawr Classical Review, and Early Christianity in the Context of Antiquity.

- "Perpetual Adjustment: The Passion of Perpetua and Felicity and the Entailments of Authenticity.” Journal of Early Christian Studies 30 (2022): 313-42.
- “Vast Lessons: Jacob of Edessa’s The Six Days and the Tools of Knowledge.” Hugoye: Journal of Syriac Studies 25 (2022): 9-42.
- "The Will of Others: Coercion, Captivity, and Choice in Late Antiquity.” Co-written with Mira Balberg. Studies in Late Antiquity 2.3 (2018): 294-315.
- “The Legend of Arius’s Death: Imagination, Space, and Filth in Late Ancient Historiography.” Past & Present: A Journal of Historical Studies 277 (2015): 3-29.
- "Simeon and Other Women in Theodoret’s Religious History: Gender in the Representation of Late Ancient Christian Asceticism.” Journal of Early Christian Studies 23 (2015): 583-606.
- "Salvage: Macrina and the Christian Project of Cultural Reclamation.” Church History: Studies in Christianity and Culture 81 (2012): 273-97.
- "Preserving the Divine: αυτο-Prefixed Generative Terms and the Untitled Treatise in the Bruce Codex.” Vigiliae Christianae 65 (2011): 311-28.
- “Ambivalence about the Angelic Life: The Promise and Perils of an Early Christian Discourse of Asceticism.” Journal of Early Christian Studies 16 (2008): 447-78.
- “The Representation of Theatricality in Philo’s Embassy to Gaius.” Journal for the Study of Judaism in the Persian, Hellenistic, and Roman Periods 39 (2008): 46-67.

=== Public engagement ===
Muehlberger is an active contributor to public scholarship and has published in online publications such as Marginalia Review of Books, where she has written on the "architecture of knowledge" in late antiquity and provided other editorial contributions as well. Muehlberger is an active public scholar on Bluesky. She has been credited as one of the popularizers of the term "doomscrolling."

== Awards and honors ==
Muehlberger was a Charles A. Ryskamp Research Fellow of the American Council of Learned Societies (2014-2015). In 2015 she received the Class of 1923 Memorial Teaching Award at the University of Michigan; in 2025, she received the Undergraduate Teaching Award from the University of Michigan's History Club. She was also awarded a National Endowment for the Humanities Fellowship (2016-2017).
