= Douglas R. A. Hare =

Douglas R. A. Hare was a naturalized American professor and writer. He was born March 22, 1929, in Simcoe, Ontario. He died in May, 2015.

Douglas R. A. Hare authored many books, articles and essays concerned with both the Old and New testaments and the Modern Christian Church. Hare’s books include "Matthew" for the well known "Interpretation" series; "The Son of Man"; "Mark," and "Chapters in the Life of Paul."

Hare, who was fluent in Biblical Greek, Latin, and Hebrew, held academic positions including Teaching Fellow, at Pittsburgh Theological Seminary; Director of Continuing Education; Instructor in New Testament; Assistant Professor of New Testament; Associate Professor of New Testament; Full Professor of New Testament; Installed as first incumbent of the William F. Orr Chair in New Testament, he was named William F. Orr Professor of New Testament Emeritus upon his retirement.

Hare graduated in 1951 with a B.A. from Victoria College, University of Toronto (Honors Philosophy and English); 1954 M.Div, from Emmanuel College, Victoria University, Toronto, where he was awarded the Sanford Gold Medal in Divinity, and Traveling Fellowship. Dr Hare then earned a Masters of Sacred Theology (S.T.M) at Union Theological Seminary, New York, going on to earn a Doctor of Theology (Dr. Theol.) from that institution in 1965. Dr. Hare became a citizen of the United States in 1961.

Following retirement, Douglas Hare moved to Mount Desert Island, Maine with his wife Ruth and his daughter Jennifer. They lived in a cabin in Hall Quarry that they built. Hare taught at Bangor Theological Seminary and served as a minister at Islesford Congregational Church for 17 years. He continued his scholarly writing, publishing three books during the 1990s and countless research articles on various biblical topics.

Ruth, his wife of more than 63 years, died in 2014. Hare is survived by two daughters, Jennifer and Laurie, and five grandchildren, Kohl, Herbie, Claire, Dora, and Helen.
