= Second Temple Judaism =

Jewish religion between 516 BCE and 70 CE

Second Temple Judaism refers to the Jewish religion as it developed during the Second Temple period, which began with the construction of the Second Temple in Persian Judah around 516 BCE and ended with the destruction of Jerusalem amidst the First Jewish–Roman War in 70 CE. This period was marked by the emergence of multiple religious currents as well as extensive cultural, religious, and political developments among the Jewish people. It saw the progression of the Hebrew Bible canon, the synagogue, and Jewish eschatology. Additionally, the rise of Christianity began in the final years of the Second Temple period—initially as a Jewish sect, but eventually as a distinct religion in its own right.

According to Jewish tradition, authentic prophecy (נְבוּאָה, Nevu'ah) ceased during the early years of the Second Temple period, leaving religious Jews without their version of divine guidance at a time when they felt most in need of support and direction. Under Hellenistic rule, the growing Hellenization of Judaism became a source of resentment among Jewish traditionalists, who clung to strict monotheistic beliefs. Opposition to Hellenistic influence on Jewish religious and cultural practices was a major catalyst for the Maccabean Revolt against the Seleucid Empire. Following the establishment of the Hasmonean dynasty, traditional Judaism was reasserted by the Maccabees across the Land of Israel as they expanded their independent territory. The later years of the Second Temple period saw the development of several Jewish messianic ideas. From c. 170 BCE to 30 CE, five successive generations of the Zugot headed Jewish spiritual affairs.

The late Second Temple period saw the emergence of several Jewish schools or groups. The Pharisees, as one influential group, included members from both the priesthood and the general population, and believed both the Written Torah and ancestral traditions were equally binding. The Sadducees, consisting of high priests and aristocrats, rejected the resurrection of the dead. The Essenes criticized the practices of the Temple, deeming the priests illegitimate and the rituals flawed. They expected a victory of good over evil, with some members choosing to live in isolation. Nonetheless, most Jews were not affiliated with any particular group and practiced common traditions like observing Shabbat, celebrating holidays, attending synagogue, making pilgrimages to the Temple, following Mosaic dietary laws, and circumcising their newborn males.

After the Roman army destroyed the Second Temple and the rest of Jerusalem in 70 CE, Judaism shifted away from Temple-based rituals, including sacrificial worship, and adapted to a new framework without its sacred centre. Jewish sectarianism disappeared, while the Pharisees, later succeeded by the rabbis, emerged as the leading religious force. This transition focused on Torah observance, ethical deeds, communal prayer, and rabbinical law—giving rise to Rabbinic Judaism, which has remained the dominant form of the religion since late antiquity.

== Historical background ==
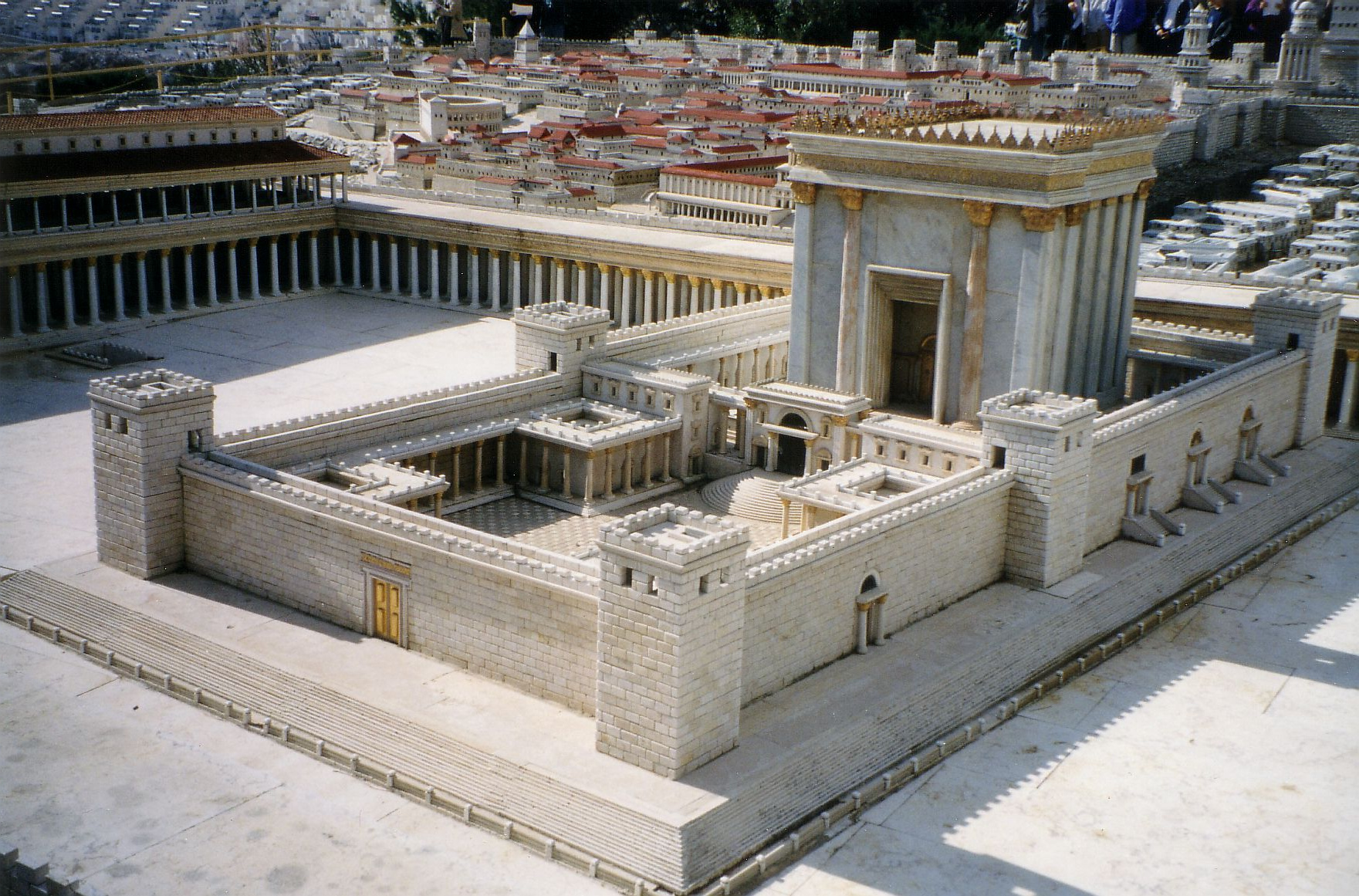
Modern reconstruction of what the Second Temple would have looked like after its renovation during the reign of Herod I.

=== Periods ===
(Note: dates and periods are in many cases approximate and/or conventional)

- Persian, 539–333 BCE
- Hellenistic, 333–164 BCE

- Ptolemaic, 301–200 BCE
- Seleucid, 200–164 BCE

- Hasmonean, 164–37 BCE
- Herodian, 37 BCE – 6 CE

- Herodian Kingdom of Judea, 37–4 BCE
- Herodian Tetrarchy, 4 BCE – 6 CE

- Roman, 6–70 CE

=== Overview ===
In 586 BCE, Babylonian king Nebuchadnezzar II captured Jerusalem, destroyed the Temple of Solomon, and deported the elite of the population to Babylon (the "Babylonian exile"). In 539 BCE, Babylon fell to the Persian conqueror Cyrus, and in 538 BCE, the exiles were permitted to return to Yehud Medinata, a Judean province of the Persian Empire. The Temple is commonly said to have been rebuilt in the period 520–515 BCE, but it seems probable that this is an artificial date chosen so that 70 years could be said to have passed between the destruction and the rebuilding, fulfilling a prophecy of Jeremiah.

The Persian period ended after Alexander the Great's conquest of the Mediterranean coast in 333-332 BCE. His empire disintegrated after his death, and Judea fell to the Ptolemies, who ruled Egypt. In 200 BCE, Israel and Judea were conquered by the Seleucids, who ruled Syria. Around 167 BCE, for reasons that remain obscure, the Seleucid king Antiochus IV Epiphanes attempted to suppress Jewish worship; this provoked a Jewish revolt that resulted in the end of Greek occupation.

Hasmonean Judea was a client kingdom of the Romans, and in the 1st century BCE, the Romans replaced them with their protégé Herod the Great. After Herod's death, Judea became a province under Rome's direct rule. Heavy taxes under the Romans and insensitivity towards the Jewish religion led to a revolt, and in 70 CE the Roman general (and later emperor) Titus captured Jerusalem and destroyed the Temple, bringing an end to the Second Temple period.

=== Jewish diaspora ===
The Jewish exiles in Babylon were not slaves or prisoners, nor were they badly treated, and when the Persians gave permission for them to return to Jerusalem the majority elected to remain where they were. They and their descendants formed the diaspora, a large community of Jews living outside Judea, and the 1st century CE historian Josephus reports that there were more Jews in Syria (i.e., the Seleucid Empire) than in any other land. There was also a significant Egyptian diaspora, although the Jews of Egypt were immigrants, not deportees, "... attracted by Hellenistic culture, eager to win the respect of the Greeks and to adapt to their ways." The Egyptian diaspora was slow to develop, but by the Hellenistic period it exceeded the Babylonian community in importance. In addition to these major centres there were Jewish communities throughout the Hellenistic and subsequently the Roman world, from North Africa to Asia Minor and Greece and in Rome. There is also evidence for Jewish missionary activities in the Greco-Roman world.

=== Samaritans ===
Overall, Second Temple Judaism and Samaritanism were two religions that gradually split from the common religion of Yahwism. For most of the Second Temple period, Samaria was larger, richer, and more populous than Judea—down to about 164 BCE there were probably more Samaritans than Judeans living in the Levant. They had their own temple on Mount Gerizim near Shechem and regarded themselves as the true Israel, who remained after Eli, a wicked high priest, convinced the other Israelites to abandon Gerizim and worship at Shiloh. Second Temple Judeans, however, derided them as foreign converts and the impure offspring of mixed marriages. By the late 2nd century BCE, the Jews and Samaritans permanently split after a Hasmonean king destroyed a Samaritan temple at Mount Gerizim; before that the Samaritans seem to have regarded themselves as part of the wider Jewish community, but afterwards they denounced the Jerusalem temple as anathema to Yahweh.

== Hebrew Bible ==
In recent decades it has become increasingly common among scholars to assume that much of the Hebrew Bible was assembled, revised and edited in the 5th century BCE to reflect the realities and challenges of the Persian era. The returnees had a particular interest in the history of Israel: the written Torah (the books of Genesis, Exodus, Leviticus, Numbers and Deuteronomy), for example, likely existed in various forms during the Monarchy (the period of the kingdoms of Israel and Judah), but according to the documentary hypothesis (disputed by some Christians) it was in the Second Temple Period that it was edited and revised into something like its current form, and the Chronicles, a history written at this time, reflects the concerns of the Persian Yehud in its almost exclusive focus on Judah and the Temple.

Prophetic works were also of particular interest to the Persian-era authors, with some works being composed at this time (the last ten chapters of Isaiah and the books of Haggai, Zechariah, Malachi and perhaps Joel) and the older prophets edited and reinterpreted. The corpus of Wisdom books saw the composition of Job, parts of Proverbs, and possibly Ecclesiastes, while the book of Psalms was possibly given its modern shape and division into five parts at this time (although the collection continued to be revised and expanded well into Hellenistic and even Roman times).

In the Hellenistic period, the scriptures were translated into Greek as the Septuagint by the Jews of the Alexandrian diaspora in Egypt, who also produced a rich literature of their own covering epic poetry, philosophy, tragedy and other forms. Less is known of the Babylonian diaspora, but the Seleucid period produced works such as the court tales of the Book of Daniel (chapters 1-6 of Daniel - chapters 7-12 were a later addition), and the books of Tobit and Esther. The eastern Jews were also responsible for the adoption and transmission of the Babylonian and Persian apocalyptic tradition seen in Daniel.

== Features ==
=== "True Israel" ===
The Hebrew Bible represents the beliefs of a small sector within the Israelite community who were exiled by the Babylonians and emphasized on orthodox worship, genealogical purity and adherence to the codified law. In the earliest stages of the Persian period, the returnees insisted on a strict separation between themselves ("Israel") and those who had never gone into exile ("Canaanites"), to the extent of prohibiting intermarriage; this was presented in terms of religious purity, but there may have been a practical concern for land ownership. Ethnic markers for Israelite (or later, Jewish) identity were radically reformed, with increased emphasis on genealogical descent and/or faith in Yahweh, compared to circumcision.

Views on gentile integration varied across Jewish schools of thought. The Sadducees doubted the possibility of gentiles becoming Jews but were tolerant of cross-cultural interactions. The Essenes community believed gentiles, including proselytes, were ritually impure, but the Essenes were even stricter and regarded other Jews as impure until they completed a prolonged initiation ritual. Likewise, the Zealots and Sicarii held xenophobic views but were willing to ally with Idumeans (or Edomites). Whilst the Zealots shared beliefs with the Pharisees, the latter were more democratic, respected the status quo, and believed Jewishness was a matter of choice rather than birth. Some historians argue the Pharisees were more interested in converting non-Pharisaical Jews. As a Jewish sect, early Christians also saw themselves as "true Israel". Compared to other Jews, they believed gentiles could assimilate without adopting customs such as circumcision. These beliefs, among others, caused Judaism and Christianity to separate as distinct religions.

Whilst most contemporary Jews had no problem with integrating gentiles, a minority adopted views from Jubilees and 4QMMT, which promoted the idea that Jews were "radically discontinuous with the rest of humanity". Those works were of Essene, Hasidean or Sadducee origin. Other Jews were dissatisfied with the Pentateuch's national-geographic definition of Jewishness, which did not sufficiently distinguish the multi-ethnic inhabitants of Judea from Jewish diasporas. For example, the Hasmoneans were criticized for blurring the line between gentile and Jew when they converted Idumeans but others, who held a strict interpretation of Deuteronomy 17:15, feared the Idumean Herodians would usurp the Hasmoneans. But most Jews believed the Idumeans were acceptable converts since they lived in the Promised Land. C.L. Crouch states that pro-integrationist Jews were more likely to descend from Jews who were re-settled in Babylonian urban centers.

=== Emphasis on temples ===
Second Temple Judaism was centered not on synagogues, which began to appear only in the 3rd century BCE, but on the Temple, and a cycle of continual animal sacrifice. Torah, or ritual law, was also important, and the Temple priests were responsible for teaching it, but the concept of scripture developed only slowly. Thus the reading and study of scripture was a late development. The written Torah and the books of the Prophets were accepted as authoritative by the 1st century CE, but beyond this core the different Jewish groups continued to accept different groups of books as authoritative.

=== Priesthood ===
The priesthood underwent profound changes with the Second Temple. Under the First Temple, the priesthood had been subordinate to the kings, but in the Second Temple, with the monarchy and even the state in the hands of foreign rulers, they became independent. The priesthood under the High Priest, which was unheard of in earlier times, became the governing authority, making the province of Yehud a de facto theocracy, although it seems unlikely that they had significant autonomy. In the Hellenistic period, the High Priest continued to play a vital role with both cultic and civic obligations, and the office reached its height under the Hasmoneans who made themselves priest-kings. Both Herod and the Romans severely reduced the importance of the High Priest, appointing and deposing High Priests to suit their purposes.

=== Integration of Idumean customs ===
Since the Hasmonean era, the Idumeans were heavily integrated in Judean society. Idumean-majority populations existed in southern and western Judea, and they intermingled with Judeans. It is disputed whether this integration was forced or voluntary. Regardless, their presence was believed to influence Second Temple Judaism, particularly Pharisaical Judaism. They introduced religious innovations such as ritual immersion in baths, burial in caves with kokhim, and the perforation of pottery vessels so they could be purified. The Herodians continued this trend, with Judea, Jerusalem and the Temple being shaped by Idumean culture. Their contributions were obfuscated by religious Jews belonging to later variants of Second Temple Judaism and Rabbinic Judaism. Hayah Katz sees these ritual immersion rituals as being stricter than the rituals found in the First Temple era. For example, many Jews argued that only full-body immersion could achieve ritual purity.

=== A typical day at the Second Temple of Jerusalem ===
The day in the Second Temple in Jerusalem until the time of Jesus unfolded as follows:

- for the Jews, the liturgical day ended and began with sundown: as soon as night fell, the doors of the temple were closed and some Levites manned them, while others kept vigil in prayer in special spaces and still others slept;
- when it was morning, the priests would take a ritual bath to purify themselves and prepare for the day's liturgy. The altar of burnt offerings was cleaned and cloths were gathered to be placed on the special altar;
- the Jewish purim was drawn to draw the priest who was to sacrifice the lamb behind closed doors. The outcome of the draw was not seen as random, but was intended as an expression of God's will;
- the designated priest would sprinkle the altar of sacrifices with the blood of the day's captive. This lamb was then divided into 12 pieces (equal to the number of the twelve closed tribes of Israel) and placed on the altar of sacrifices. The lamb had to be without blemish and before it was sacrificed it was watered one last time;
- after the first morning sacrifice, a priest would go to the highest place in the temple to wait for the sunrise that would start the liturgical day. According to a tradition of the School of Hillel (the strictest of the Tannaite period), the morning sacrifice had the ability to erase Israel's sins;
- the temple doors were opened and five of the seven menorah candles were lit. The priests would move to the stone hall (where meetings of the Sanhedrin also took place) to recite the shemà Israel (cf. Deuteronomy 6:9, Deuteronomy 11:13–21, Numbers 15:37–41);
- after this prayer, which the pious Israelite recited every morning and evening, from among the 24 priestly families from the temple the priest who was to offer incense was drawn and the last two candles of the Menorah were thus lit;
- a priest would take the magrefà (probably a bronze musical instrument) and throw it by the altar. The sound of the instrument was the signal for the worshippers to gather in the men's courtyard. The Levites would stand on the steps to the Nicanor gate to chant the psalms;
- upon leaving the Holy One, the priest would go to the platform of the altar of sacrifices to bless the people by raising his hands above his head (cf. Numbers 6:24–26);
- after the blessing, 12 other priests designated for the ceremony would go up the ramp and proceed to offer the twelve parts into which the sacrificial lamb had been divided. They would each hand their part to the presiding priest, who would take it, swing it over the altar and throw it into the fire;
- when the offering was completed, cymbals were sounded and the Levites began to sing, a sign of the conclusion of the Lamb's morning sacrifice. From then on, throughout the day the faithful could present their personal sacrifices. The priests received a portion of the meat of the sacrifices for the forgiveness of sins;
- during the ninth hour the vespertine sacrifice took place, repeating the offering of the incense of the lamb. At the end of the ceremony, the priests would lay down their garments in the designated closets and return to their quarters. On Saturdays and on feast days, during the day a third lamb was offered for all the people.

== Intellectual currents ==
=== Monotheism ===
There was a sharp break between ancient Israelite religion and the Judaism of the Second Temple. Pre-exilic Israel was mostly polytheistic (see Yahwism). Asherah was probably worshiped as Yahweh's consort, within his temples in Jerusalem, Bethel, and Samaria featuring what seem to be standing stones for another deity, and a goddess called the Queen of Heaven, probably a fusion of Astarte and the Mesopotamian goddess Ishtar, was possibly also worshiped, though this is often viewed as another title for Asherah. Baal and Yahweh coexisted in the early period but were considered irreconcilable after the 9th century. The worship of Yahweh alone, the concern of a small party in the monarchic period, gained ascendancy only in the exilic and early post-exilic period, and it was only in the post-exilic period that the very existence of other gods was denied.

=== Messianism and the end times ===
The Persian period saw the development of expectation in a future human king who would rule a purified Israel as God's representative at the end of time – that is, a messiah. The first to mention this were Haggai and Zechariah, both prophets of the early Persian period. They saw Zerubbabel as a figure similar to a Messiah, as a descendant of the House of David who seemed, briefly, to be about to re-establish the ancient royal line. Zechariah writes of two messiahs, one royal and the other priestly. These early hopes were dashed (Zerubabbel disappears from the historical record, although the High Priests continued to be descended from Joshua), and thereafter there are merely general references to a Messiah of (meaning descended from) David.

=== Wisdom ===
Wisdom, or hokmah, implied the learning acquired by study and formal education: "those who can read and write, those who have engaged in study, and who know literature, are the wise par excellence". The literature associated with this tradition includes the books of Job, Psalms, Proverbs, Ecclesiastes, Song of Songs, Sirach and the Wisdom of Solomon, the so-called Sapiential books.

=== Conflict between Judaism and the Judean state ===
During the Hasmoean dynasty, Jews were conflicted on whether to be religiously or politically oriented, which was represented by the thematic differences in 1 Maccabees and 2 Maccabees. 1 Maccabees, for instance, focuses on Judean affairs, generalizes all gentile rulers as being evil, believes Jewish martyrs were "pious fools", makes little mention of God and prayer, and attributes events to blind chance. 2 Maccabees argues that anti-Judean persecution by the hands of Gentiles is divine judgment for Judean wickedness. Daniel R. Scwhartz considers 2 Maccabees to be implicitly anti-Hasmonean and pro-Pharisee. One reason for the covert criticism includes 2 Maccabees being written too early and their authors being diasporic.

== Proselytism ==
The issue of conversion to Judaism and Jewish proselytism in Second Temple Judaism has occupied many scholars from the 19th century to the present day. Research has not yet yielded a consensus among scholars: some believe that Judaism was a missionary religion, and others reject their conclusions. Some assess that the conversion of Gentiles to Judaism in the Hellenistic and Roman periods was a wide-ranging phenomenon of great demographic importance, while others doubt this. Modern research does not have the possibility to determine how many Gentiles converted, and it is not possible to determine what their share was in the total Jewish population.

Some scholars suggest that Jesus' quote in the Gospel of Matthew, "Woe to you, teachers of the law and Pharisees, you hypocrites! You travel over land and sea to win a single convert, and when you have succeeded, you make them twice as much a child of hell as you are", is evidence of Jewish proselytism during the time period. However, scholars such as Martin Goodman, for instance, argue that phrase relates to the Pharisees' attempt to persuade Jews to join their school of thought rather than their efforts to convert non-Jews.

== Emergence of Christianity ==
Early Christianity emerged within Second Temple Judaism during the 1st century, the key difference between Judaism and Jewish Christianity being the Christian belief that Jesus was the resurrected Jewish Messiah. Judaism is known to allow for multiple messianic figures, the two most relevant being Messiah ben Joseph and the Messiah ben David. The idea of two messiahs—one suffering and the second fulfilling the traditional messianic role—was normal in ancient Judaism and possibly even predated Jesus. Alan Segal states "one can speak of a 'twin birth' of two new Judaisms, both markedly different from the religious systems that preceded them. Not only were rabbinic Judaism and Christianity religious twins, but, like Jacob and Esau, the twin sons of Isaac and Rebecca, they fought in the womb, setting the stage for life after the womb."

The first Christians (the disciples or followers of Jesus) were essentially all ethnically Jewish or Jewish proselytes. In other words, Jesus was Jewish, preached to the Jewish people and called from them his first disciples. Jewish Christians regarded "Christianity" as an affirmation of every aspect of contemporary Judaism, with the addition of one extra belief—that Jesus is the Messiah. The doctrines of the apostles of Jesus brought the early church into conflict with some Jewish religious authorities (e.g., the Book of Acts records a dispute over the resurrection of the dead, which was rejected by the Sadducees) and possibly later led to Christians' expulsion from synagogues (see Council of Jamnia for other theories). While Marcionism rejected all Jewish influence on Christianity, proto-orthodox Christianity instead retained some of the doctrines and practices of 1st-century Judaism while rejecting others. They held the Tanakh to be authoritative and sacred, employing mostly the Septuagint or Targum translations and adding other texts as the New Testament canon developed. Christian baptism was another continuation of a Judaic practice.

Recent work by historians paints a more complex portrait of late Second Temple Judaism and early Christianity. Some historians have suggested that, before his death, Jesus created amongst his believers such certainty that the Kingdom of God and the resurrection of the dead was at hand, that with few exceptions when they saw him shortly after his execution, they had no doubt that he had been resurrected, and that the arrival of the kingdom and resurrection of the dead was at hand. These specific beliefs were compatible with Second Temple Judaism. In the following years the restoration of the kingdom, as Jews expected it, failed to occur. Some Christians began to believe instead that Christ, rather than simply being the Jewish messiah, was God made flesh, who died for the sins of humanity, marking the beginning of Christology.

Some scholars additionally note the role of Hellenistic Judaism in Christianity and believe that the doctrine of Jesus's death for the redemption of mankind was not possible without Hellenism. (Note: Eddy & Boyd (2007), p. 136: "Burton Mack argues that Paul's view of Jesus as a divine figure who gives his life for the salvation of others had to originate in a Hellenistic rather than a Jewish environment. Mack writes, "Such a notion [of vicarious human suffering] cannot be traced to old Jewish and/ or Israelite traditions, for the very notion of a vicarious human sacrifice was anathema in these cultures. But it can be traced to a Strong Greek tradition of extolling a noble death." More specifically, Mack argues that a Greek "myth of martyrdom" and the "noble death" tradition are ultimately responsible for influencing the hellenized Jews of the Christ cults to develop a divinized Jesus." Eddy & Boyd (2007), p. 93further note that "The most sophisticated and influential version of the hellenization thesis was forged within the German Religionsgeschichtliche Schule of the late nineteenth and early twentieth centuries—now often referred to as the "old history of religions school." Here, the crowning literary achievement in several ways is Wilhelm Bousset's 1913 work Kyrios Christos. Bousset envisions two forms of pre-Pauline Christianity: 1. In the early Palestinian community, and 2. In the Hellenistic communities.")

While on one hand Jesus and the very first Christians had all been ethnically Jewish, the Jews by and large continued to reject Jesus as the Messiah. This affected early Christianity's relationship with Judaism and the surrounding pagan traditions. The anti-Christian polemicist Celsus criticises Jews for deserting their Jewish heritage while they had claimed to hold on to it. To the Emperor Julian, Christianity was simply an apostasy from Judaism. These factors hardened Christian attitudes towards Jewry.

== See also ==
- Origins of Judaism
- Synagogal Judaism
- Hillel the Elder and Hillel and Shammai
- Intertestamental period
- Mandaeans, may have been part of the Essene community
- Split of early Christianity and Judaism
- Third Temple
- Jerusalem during the Second Temple period

== Sources ==
- Ackerman, Susan (2003). "Goddesses". In Richard, Suzanne (ed.). Near Eastern Archaeology:A Reader. Eisenbrauns. ISBN 9781575060835.
- Adler, Yonatan (2022). The Origins of Judaism: An Archaeological-Historical Reappraisal. New Haven, Conn: Yale University Press. ISBN 978-0-300-25490-7.
- Albertz, Rainer (1994a) [1992]. A History of Israelite Religion. Vol. I: From the Beginnings to the End of the Monarchy. Translated by John Bowden (Reprint ed.). Louisville, Kentucky: Westminster John Knox. ISBN 0-664-21846-6.
- Albertz, Rainer (1994b) [1992]. A History of Israelite Religion. Vol. II: From the Exile to the Maccabees. Translated by John Bowden (Reprint ed.). Louisville, Kentucky: Westminster John Knox. ISBN 0-664-21847-4.
- Albertz, Rainer (2003). Israel in Exile. SBL Press. ISBN 9781589830554.
- Berquist, Jon L. (2007). Approaching Yehud: New Approaches to the Study of the Persian Period. SBL Press. ISBN 9781589831452.
- Betz, Arnold Gottfried (2000). "Monotheism". In Freedman, David Noel; Myer, Allen C. (eds.). Eerdmans Dictionary of the Bible. Eerdmans. ISBN 9053565035.
- Bickerman, Elias J. (1984). "The Babylonian Captivity". In Finkelstein, Louis (ed.). The Cambridge History of Judaism: Volume 1, Introduction, The Persian Period. Cambridge University Press. ISBN 9780521218801.
- Cohen, Shaye J. D. (1984). "The Significance of Yavneh: Pharisees, Rabbis, and the End of Jewish Sectarianism". Hebrew Union College Annual. 55: 27–53. JSTOR 23507609.
- Cohen, Shayne (1999). The Beginnings of Jewishness: Boundaries, Varieties, Uncertainties (3rd ed.). University of California Press. ISBN 9780520211414.
- Cohen, Shayne (2014). From the Maccabees to the Mishnah (3rd ed.). Westminster John Knox Press. ISBN 9780664239046.
- Collins, John J. (2017). The Invention of Judaism: Torah and Jewish Identity from Deuteronomy to Paul. University of California Press. ISBN 9780520967366.
- Collins, John J. (2000). Between Athens and Jerusalem: Jewish Identity in the Hellenistic Diaspora. Eerdmans. ISBN 9780802843722.
- Coogan, Michael David; Brettler, Marc Zvi; Newsom, Carol Ann (2007). "Editors' Introduction". In Coogan, Michael David; Brettler, Marc Zvi; Newsom, Carol Ann (eds.). The New Oxford Annotated Bible with the Apocryphal/Deuterocanonical Books. Oxford University Press. ISBN 9780195288803.
- Davies, Philip R.; Rogerson, John (2005). The Old Testament World. Westminster John Knox. ISBN 9780567084880.
- Edelman, Diana Vikander (2014). The Origins of the Second Temple: Persian Imperial Policy and the Rebuilding of Jerusalem. Routledge. ISBN 9781317491637.
- Eddy, Paul Rhodes; Boyd, Gregory A. (2007). The Jesus Legend: A Case for the Historical Reliability of the Synoptic Jesus Tradition. Baker Academic. ISBN 978-0-8010-3114-4.
- Flusser, David (2009). Judaism of the Second Temple Period. Eerdmans. ISBN 9780802824585.
- Fredriksen, Paula (2000). From Jesus to Christ: The Origins of the New Testament Images of Christ (2nd ed.). Yale University Press. ISBN 0300084579.
- Grabbe, Lester L. (2010). An Introduction to Second Temple Judaism: History and Religion of the Jews in the Time of Nehemiah, the Maccabees, Hillel, and Jesus. London; New York: T&T Clark International. ISBN 978-0-567-05161-5.
- Hegermann, Harald (1990). "The Diaspora in the Hellenistic Age". In Finkelstein, Louis (ed.). The Cambridge History of Judaism: Volume 2, The Hellenistic Age. Cambridge University Press. ISBN 9780521219297.
- Hess, Richard S. (2007). Israelite Religions: An Archaeological and Biblical Survey. Baker Academic. ISBN 9780801027178.
- Knoppers, Gary N. (2013). Jews and Samaritans: The Origins and History of Their Early Relations. Oxford University Press. ISBN 9781575060835. (ISBN is for Google Books version. Paper version ISBN 9780195329544)
- Leith, Mary Joan Winn (2001). "Israel Among the Nations: The Persian Period". In Coogan, Michael D. (ed.). The Oxford History of the Biblical World. OUP. ISBN 9780195139372.
- Liverani, Mario (2014). Israel's History and the History of Israel. Routledge. ISBN 9781317488934.
- Mack, Burton L. (1995) [1995]. Who Wrote the New Testament? The Making of the Christian Myth.
- Malamat, Abraham; Ben-Sasson, Haim Hillel (1976). A History of the Jewish People. Harvard University Press. ISBN 9780674397309.
- Moore, Megan Bishop; Kelle, Brad E. (2011). Biblical History and Israel's Past: The Changing Study of the Bible and History. Eerdmans. ISBN 9780802862600.
- Nelson, Richard D. (2014). Historical Roots of the Old Testament (1200–63 BCE). SBL Press. ISBN 9781628370065.
- Pummer, Reinhard (2016). The Samaritans: A Profile. Wm. B. Eerdmans Publishing. ISBN 978-0-8028-6768-1.
- Safrai, Samuel (1976). "The Era of the Mishnah and Talmud (70–640)". A History of the Jewish People. Cambridge, Massachusetts: Harvard University Press. pp. 307–382. ISBN 0-674-39731-2.
- Schaper, Joachim (1999). "The Pharisees". In Horbury, William; Davies, W. D.; Sturdy, John (eds.). The Early Roman Period. The Cambridge History of Judaism. Vol. 3. Cambridge University Press. pp. 402–427. ISBN 9781139053662.
- Schiffman, Lawrence H. (2003). Jon Bloomberg; Samuel Kapustin (eds.). Understanding Second Temple and Rabbinic Judaism. Jersey, NJ: KTAV. ISBN 9780881258134.
- Smith, Mark S. (2002). The Early History of God: Yahweh and the Other Deities in Ancient Israel. Eerdmans. ISBN 9780802839725.
- Wanke, Gunther (1984). "Prophecy and Psalms in the Persian Period". In Finkelstein, Louis (ed.). The Cambridge History of Judaism: Volume 1, Introduction, The Persian Period. Cambridge University Press. ISBN 9780521218801.
- Wellhausen, Julius (2006) [1885]. Prolegomena to the History of Israel. Black. ISBN 9781606202050.
- Wright, J. Edward (1999). The Early History of Heaven. Oxford University Press. ISBN 9780198029816.
