= Anti-Judaism in early Christianity =

Anti-Judaism in Early Christianity is a description of anti-Judaic sentiment in the first three centuries of Christianity; the 1st, 2nd, and 3rd centuries. Early Christianity is sometimes considered as Christianity before 325 when the First Council of Nicaea was convoked by Constantine the Great, although it is not unusual to consider 4th and 5th century Christianity as members of this category as well.

Jewish Christians were excluded from the synagogue, according to one theory of the Council of Jamnia, as they refused to pay the Fiscus Judaicus.

William Nicholls wrote in his book Christian Antisemitism: A History of Hate:

...the very presence of the Jewish people in the world, continuing to believe in the faithfulness of God to the original covenant ... puts a great question against Christian belief in a new covenant made through Christ. The presence of this question, often buried deep in the Christian mind, could not fail to cause profound and gnawing anxiety. Anxiety usually leads to hostility.

Rabbi Michael J. Cook believes that both contemporary Jews and contemporary Christians need to reexamine the history of early Christianity, and the transformation of Christianity from a Jewish sect consisting of followers of a Jewish Jesus, to a separate religion often dependent on the tolerance of Rome while proselytizing among Gentiles loyal to the Roman empire, to understand how the story of Jesus came to be recast in an anti-Jewish form as the Gospels took their final form.

The Greek word Ioudaioi could also be translated "Judaeans", meaning in some cases specifically the Jews from Judaea, as opposed to people from Galilee or Samaria for instance.

== New Testament ==
It has been argued that the New Testament contributed toward subsequent antisemitism in the Christian community. A. Roy Eckardt has asserted that the foundation of antisemitism and responsibility for the Holocaust lies ultimately in the New Testament.

Eckardt insisted that Christian repentance must include a reexamination of basic theological attitudes toward Jews and the New Testament in order to deal effectively with antisemitism.

== Post New Testament ==
A number of hostile early actions taken by Church leaders against the Jews are believed to have influenced later Christian thought.

One example of these acts comes from a historical account relating to Ambrose, the bishop of Milan. In 388, then-Roman Emperor Theodosius the Great was informed that a bishop in Callinicum led his followers in the destruction and burning of a local synagogue. Ambrose, upon learning of the local governor of Callinicum's intent to force the bishop responsible to pay for the reconstruction of the synagogue, appealed the sentence to the Emperor. When Theodosius first denied the appeal, Ambrose "publicly refused him communion until he reversed the governor's sentence." Ultimately, Theodosius agreed with Ambrose and the decision of the governor was overturned. Many scholars believe that instances like this contributed to Christian notions of the Jews as second-class citizens, whose property is worth inherently less than theirs.

According to the 2nd century Roman historian Justin, the Christians were "seen as the 'true spiritual Israel' because the Jews had despised and forsaken the law of God and God's holy covenant". Many Roman officials, including Justin, based upon the perception of the Christians as their god's chosen people, advocated for the expansion of Gentile rights in the Roman Empire, while also aiming to drastically reduce the rights the Jews had during that time, believing their claim to legitimacy to be false.

== See also ==
- Christian antisemitism
- Deicide
- Good Friday Prayer
- History of antisemitism
- Jews in the New Testament
- Judaism
- Judas Iscariot
- Passion of the Christ
- Persecution of Christians
- Religious pluralism
- Criticisms of Christianity
