= Shafir (surname) =

Shafir is a surname. Notable people with the surname include:

- Eldar Shafir, American behavioral scientist
- Herzl Shafir (1929–2021), Israeli major general
- Iakov Mikhailovich Shafir (1886–1938), Bolshevik historian
- Iakov Moiseyevich Shafir (1887–1938), Soviet investigator and journalist
- Marina Shafir (born 1988), Moldovan wrestler and mixed martial artist
- Michael Shafir (born 1944), Romanian–Israeli political scientist
- Relik Shafir (born 1953), Israeli brigadier general
- Shlomo Shafir (1924–2013), Israeli journalist and historian
