= Gesher =

Gesher (Hebrew: גֶּשֶׁר, lit. bridge) may refer to:

- Gesher (1996 political party), a defunct political party in Israel
- Gesher (2019 political party), a political party in Israel
- Gesher Theater, a theater in Tel-Aviv
- Gesher – Zionist Religious Centre, defunct political party in Israel in the early 1980s
- Gesher, Israel, a kibbutz in Israel
- Camp Gesher, a Habonim-Dror summer camp in Cloyne, Ontario
- Gesher (archaeological site), an archaeological site in Israel
- Gesher, the former codename of the Intel Sandy Bridge microprocessor architecture
- Gesher, journal of the World Jewish Congress, edited by Shlomo Shafir

== See also ==
- Gescher
