= Camp Moshava =

Camp Moshava may refer to:

- Camp Moshava (Bnei Akiva), affiliated camps of Bnei Akiva in the United States and Canada
- Camp Moshava (Habonim Dror), an affiliate camp of Habonim Dror in Street, Maryland
