= Na'aleh =

Na'aleh or Naale may refer to:

- Na'ale, a communal Israeli settlement in the West Bank
- Camp Na'aleh, a New York summer camp run by Habonim Dror
- Naale program, an international high school in Israel program

== See also ==
- Nale (disambiguation)
