= Camp Kinderwelt =

Former Jewish summer camp in New York, U.S.

Camp Kinderwelt, (pronounced kin-der-velt, with Kinderwelt meaning Children's World in Yiddish and German) was a Jewish sleepaway summer camp of the New York chapter of the Farband labor Zionist landsmanschaft (mutual aid association). Located in Highland Mills, New York, Kinderwelt shared its 250 acres (1.0 km^{2}) with the Farband's adult summer colony Unser Camp (with Unser meaning Our in Yiddish and German).

== History ==
Kinderwelt, founded in the 1920s, remained in operation until 1971, with Unser closing the following year. Despite its Yiddish/German name, most of the children attending Kinderwelt spoke English, creating a linguistic divide with the Yiddish speaking adults at Unser, aside from the "cultural" divide between the mostly American born children and the mostly European born adults. After the creation of the State of Israel, mornings before breakfast and late afternoons before dinner found the campers assembled at two adjacent flagpoles: one with the flag of the United States, the other with the flag of Israel.

The year following the creation of the Young Poale Zion Alliance in 1931, Unser Camp played home to the YPZA's first Camp Kvutza, which then moved to Accord, New York, in 1933.

== In popular media ==
An episode of the American TV sitcom The Nanny (Season:2 Episode 15: "Kindervelt Days") found its heroine attending a Camp Kindervelt reunion party, reflecting the fact that some staffers of the show were former Kinderwelt campers.

== Notable alumni ==
- Leon Lederman, Nobel Prize in Physics in 1988 for his part in the discovery of the sub-atomic particle, the muon neutrino.
- Sidney Lumet, American director, producer, and screenwriter with over 50 films to his credit. He was nominated five times for the Academy Award: four for Best Director for 12 Angry Men, Dog Day Afternoon, Network, and The Verdict, and one for Best Adapted Screenplay for Prince of the City.
- Chana Bloch, an American poet, translator, and scholar. She was a professor emerita of English at Mills College in Oakland, California.
- Gabriel Macht, American actor and film producer best known for playing The Spirit in the eponymous 2008 film adaptation, as well as for his role as Harvey Specter on the USA Network series Suits, didn't go to camp, but his mom, Suzanne Pulier is a celebrated alumni of Camp Kinderwelt.
- Abraham Foxman, lawyer and activist. He was National Director of the Anti-Defamation League from 1987 to 2015 and is currently the League's National Director Emeritus. In March 2016, he became head of the Center for the Study of Anti-Semitism at the Museum of Jewish Heritage in New York City.
- Manny Azenberg, an American theater producer and general manager whose professional relationship with playwright Neil Simon spanned over 30 years, his credits also include Rent and The Wiz. Manny is also the nephew of actor Wolf Barzel, who was in Unser Camp and son of Charlie Azenberg, who was a manager of Unser Camp.
- Jules Dassin, film director.
- Jerome Robbins, choreographer, director, dancer theater producer and recipient of a Kennedy Center Honor.
- David Opatoshu, actor.
- Zvee Scooler, actor. (Was the camp's director)

Published writers who went to Camp Kinderwelt include Fradle Pomerantz Freidenreich, Barry Sheinkopf, Irwin Wall, Gerd Stern, Myron Pulier, Sylvia Boorstein, Leonard Michaels, Dori Weinstein, Steve Haines, Martin Smith, Allen Weinstein and David Friedman. Artists include painter Donna Levinstone, Ellen Pushkin and jewelry designer Judith Ripka.

== See also ==
- Yidish Natsionaler Arbeter Farband
