= Yidish Natsionaler Arbeter Farband =

- Founded at: United States

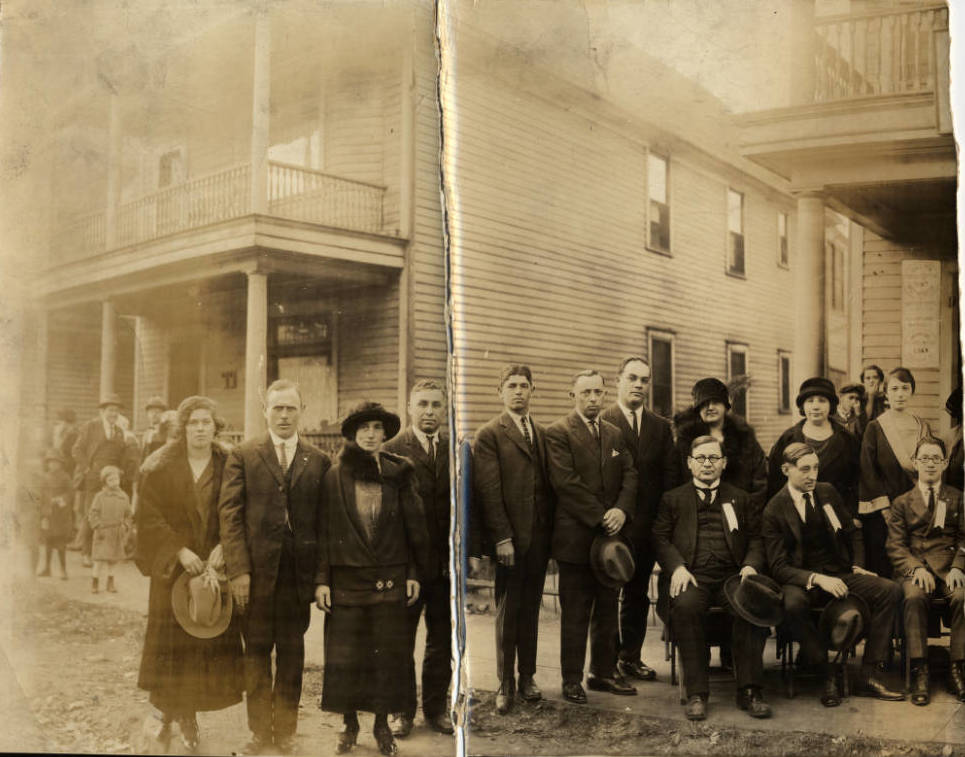
Members of the NJWA in front of their Minneapolis meeting hall

The Yidish Natsionaler Arbeter Farband (יידיש־נאַציאָנאַלער אַרבעטער־פאַרבאַנד, also known as Jewish National Workers Alliance (NJWA)) was an early Yiddish-speaking Labor Zionist landsmanshaft in North America, founded in 1912. Its official organ was the Yidishe Kempfer or Jewish Fighter, edited by Baruch Zuckerman. The Farband operated as a mutual aid society parallel to the political party Poale Zion, organizing cooperative insurance and medical plans and an extensive Yiddish and Hebrew educational system, as well as having developed in the 1920s a cooperative housing building in the Bronx, New York. The Farband even developed and maintained cemeteries for movement members. While mainly based in New York, the Farband was active throughout the United States and Canada, forming local chapters and summer camps in many cities with significant Jewish communities. The summer camp for the New York chapter was called Camp Kinderwelt, located in Upstate New York, and had an adjoining adults camp called Unser Camp. The Farband ran a network of secular schools in the US and Canada, called Folkshulen. In 1931 the Farband Yugnt Clubs, their youth wing, joined with Young Poale Zion to form the Young Poale Zion Alliance as the official youth wing of the entire Labor Zionist movement in America.

The Los Angeles branch published Chaim Grade, including the Yiddish originals of The Agunah and The Yeshiva.

In 1971, the Farband joined with Poale Zion, the Labor Zionist Organization of America, and the American Habonim Association to form the Labor Zionist Alliance, which in 2004 re-branded and renamed itself as Ameinu.

== See also ==
- The Workmen's Circle/Arbeter Ring
- International Workers Order
- Habonim Dror
