= Wellesley Aron =

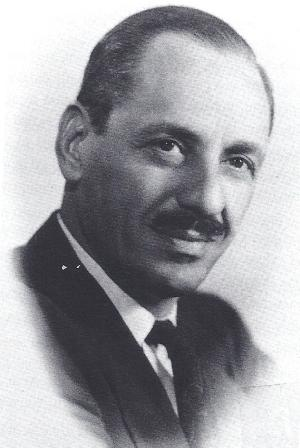
- Born: June 18, 1901; London, England
- Died: 7 June 1988 (aged 86); Israel
- Spouse(s): Rose Aron, Coral Aron
- Military career
- Allegiance: United Kingdom
- Branch: British Army
- Service years: 1939–1945
- Rank: Major
- Units: 178 Coy, Royal Army Service Corps
- Conflicts: World War II
- Awards: MBE
- Other work: Businessman, community leader, peace activist

Major Wellesley Aron, MBE (18 June 1901 – 7 June 1988), was an English born Jewish businessman, community leader, and soldier who served in World War II as a member of the Jewish Brigade. Pre-war he served as a community leader in the East End of London. Having been an active Boy Scout during his school years, he saw scouting as the solution to giving the young people a sense of purpose.

He founded the 36th Stepney Jewish Scout Troop and later founded a new non-Zionist "Jewish cultural youth movement" teaching Jewish history and outdoor craft. Post WWII he aided in the founding of Israel, was heavily involved with the founding of Rotary International, before campaigning for peace until his death in 1988.

== Early years ==
Born in London on 18 June 1901, he was the only child of a German Jewish mother but the fifth child of a German Jewish father. His half-siblings were all raised in their mother's Christian faith. Jewish religious observance was almost non-existent in his mother's home according to Wellesley.

During World War I the family lived for a time in Germany before moving to Switzerland. His half-brother and a cousin died during the war, which he believed led to his father's death shortly after. At the end of the war, Wellesley and his mother returned to London.

In 1919 Wellesley enrolled at Jesus College, Cambridge, where he studied ancient and modern French History. However, at his mother's insistence he returned to London and became involved in the business world.

It was at this time, in 1921, at the suggestion of Basil Henriques, that Wellesley became involved with disadvantaged youth from the East End of London. Having been an active Boy Scout during his school years, he saw scouting as the solution to giving the young people a sense of purpose. He founded the 36th Stepney Jewish Scout Troop which would become known in London for its scouting prowess. This first encounter with underprivileged Jews was to have a profound influence, as he later wrote, "the two years I spent with these responsive young scouts left a real and lasting satisfaction such as I have never experienced".

Forced to support himself, he took the post of assistant housemaster at Hillel House.

It was during this period Wellesley had his first personal encounter with antisemitism. He spent vacation time with his Christian half-sister in Devon. There he met and fell in love with a young woman. They wanted to marry but her father refused to allow it because Aron was Jewish. Returning to Cambridge he was in total shock over this rejection based simply on the fact that he was a Jew, and spent much time soul searching.

== Zionism ==
For the first time Wellesley was forced to ask himself, what, if anything, it meant to be a Jew. Eventually he came to the conclusion that he had to go to Palestine.

Always a person of action he actively prepared for his emigration to Palestine. Already speaking three languages he now studied Hebrew. At the same time, he became active in the student Zionist club. It was here that he first met Dr Chaim Weizmann, the chemist and Zionist leader who later became Israel's first President.

At the same time, he faced another inconsistency – the ambivalence displayed by English Jews to the Zionist aim of reestablishing a sovereign Jewish community in Palestine. Basil Henriques, who had often charged him with being "un-Jewish" for not including Jewish content into his Scouting activities, now saw it as a "tragedy" that Aron had decided to go to Palestine.

Wellesley recalled that it was this period that forced him to reject the conventional religious approach of Orthodox Judaism and look instead "to the renaissance of the Jewish People as a political entity in its own homeland".

After graduating from Cambridge in 1926, he moved to what was then Palestine. He spent the next years in Haifa and Tel Aviv teaching sports and English – first at Reali and then at the famous Herzliya Gymnasia. In the meantime, he began to familiarise himself with Zionism. He met and married his wife Rose and they had their first child, a girl.

== Habonim ==
Before his return to London, Wellesley was asked by Weizmann for a second time in 1927 to assist with the political wing of the Zionist Office in London. Due to the Balfour Declaration of 1917 in which "His Majesty's Government viewed with favour the establishment of a Jewish National Home in Palestine", the centre of political Zionism had moved to London.) Wellesley returned a year later with his young family and started to work at the Zionist Federation Offices at 77 Great Russell Street. His overseer there, Leonard Stein did not share his work burden easily, and Wellesley found himself with relatively little to do. He therefore decided to see for himself the extent to which Jewish history was being taught in the Stepney Jewish youth clubs in London's poverty-struck East End, which, at that time, were being run by his friend Basil Henriques. He found that the clubs were Jewish only because of their membership but that nothing about Jewish history or about Palestine was being taught.

Wellesley's solution was to found a new non-Zionist "Jewish cultural youth movement", which would combine the principles of Baden Powell's scouting with a love of Jewish heritage, and taught not only Jewish history but also Modern Hebrew and songs and dances, in addition to camping craft and other outdoor activities, like the Scouting Movement. Wellesley produced a handbook with instructions on how to run groups of teenagers, using elements of Jewish history and symbolism, tests and ceremonies not dissimilar to those customary in scouting. He would later call it Habonim after the place in Haifa.

To build the content around Jewish civilisation, Wellesley authored a history of the Jewish people in "a thousand words ...that a child could read". His prior attempts to get this written by various authoritative Jewish sources had failed to achieve suitable results, and he was thus constrained to undertake the task on his own.

Aron's efforts to obtain funding to move forward the establishment of Habonim also saw him become one of the founders of the Bar-Kochba Jewish sports organisation in England. "It was easier to get moneys for sports than Jewish culture" he later recalled. Bar-Kochba in turn led to the founding of the English Maccabi sports movement.

In 1931, on the termination of his position under Weizmann, Wellesley returned to Palestine. Habonim, which began as "a Jewish Cultural Youth Movement" subsequently developed into a Zionist Youth Movement that has had enormous impact in both Israel and Jewish communities worldwide. Habonim flourished and has become worldwide in its activities. It has since linked up with Dror, a semi-political Jewish Zionist Movement whose roots go back to 1917 Polish and European sources.

== Palestine and World War II ==
On his return to Palestine, Wellesley founded a successful advertising agency. In 1938, aware of the possibility of war with Germany, Aron made strenuous efforts to interest the British High Command in the idea of stockpiling reserve supplies of war materiel and food in Palestine. He foresaw the possibility of Germany being victorious in North Africa.

When these efforts failed and war broke out in 1939, he enlisted in the British Army as a Palestinian volunteer, where he rose to become the senior Jewish officer enlisted from Palestine and the first to command a unit. His unit, 178 coy, RASC, was made up primarily of Jewish Palestinian volunteers. Together with four other Jewish RASC units they served with the Eight Army in North Africa. At Tobruk they were under siege for several months until relieved and convoyed by sea to Egypt.

Later, in Italy in 1944, risking court-martial, he led his unit in helping rescue many Jewish refugees who had escaped the concentration camps of the Holocaust. Aron's unit, together with the other Jewish Palestinian R.A.S.C units, became the vanguard of the Jewish Brigade founded in 1944. Aron authored his account of that military experience (see reference).

In 1945 Wellesley was one of four Jewish Palestinian officers to receive awards from the British Government. According to the citation, "Wellesley was an officer of the first Palestinian R.A.S.C Company to see active service in the desert and is the senior Palestinian R.A.S.C Company Commander... Major Wellesley proved himself to be an officer of outstanding merit who devotes himself wholeheartedly to the interests of his own unit and of the formation he serves"

== Israel ==
At war's end, Wellesley continued his involvement in Zionist activities. In November 1945, given his military experience, he was asked to join David Ben-Gurion, Golda Meir and Chaim Weizmann in testifying before the Anglo-American Committee of Inquiry in Jerusalem. As was often the case, his testimony showed his independence. Despite being a British Military officer he spoke against the prevailing British viewpoint.

In 1947, he was asked to organise the Machal office in New York. This was his last official mission for the new State. However, later back in Israel and having returned to private business, he engaged in covert meetings on behalf of Israel aimed at reducing tensions with Jordan.

Always the organiser, Wellesley was heavily involved in developing Rotary in Israel. Joining in 1934, he became its first District Governor after working hard to have Israel recognised as of District in Rotary International. Rotary brought him back once again to involvement with neglected youth in low-income areas. This earlier experience had led him to the founding of Habonim. Now the result was the building of a youth sports centre in Jaffa.

At the other end of the social scale he volunteered his organising skills to the planning committee for Israel's first golf course in Caesarea.

== Peace activism ==
Wellesley had a total commitment to peace. In 1967, following the Six-Day War, he volunteered to "teach peace" to high school seniors in Tel Aviv. So enthusiastic was the response he was asked to repeat the course at an Arab school in Jaffa.

In 1967 his quest for peace led him to several years of research seeking to find an institution that had peace as the foundation of its curriculum. He prepared a symposium outline for the Harry S. Truman Institute for the Advancement of Peace at the Hebrew University of Jerusalem, which was rejected on the grounds that it had too much emphasis on youth and not enough on the scholarly approach.

== Neve Shalom – Wāħat as-Salām ==
His personal commitment to peace among peoples found its ultimate expression in the last years of his life.

Aged 70, Wellesley joined Father Bruno Hussar, a Catholic priest, in pioneering the establishment of Neve Shalom – Wāħat as-Salām, an Arab-Jewish village near Jerusalem. He moved there with his second wife, Coral, in 1980.

Samuel W. Lewis, former USA Ambassador to Israel and close friend described their home as a "...concrete box on a windswept, barren, rocky hill". They lived there until his death in 1988.

He is quoted as saying that his quest for a program where peace is taught started with a question from his grandson. The grandson wanted to know why there are only war colleges and not peace colleges. That grandson, David Broza, one of Israel's most famous singers, has taken over his grandfather's mantle in the quest for peace.
