= Beit HaEmek =

Kibbutz in northern Israel

Beit HaEmek: בֵּית הָעֵמֶק (Hebrew)
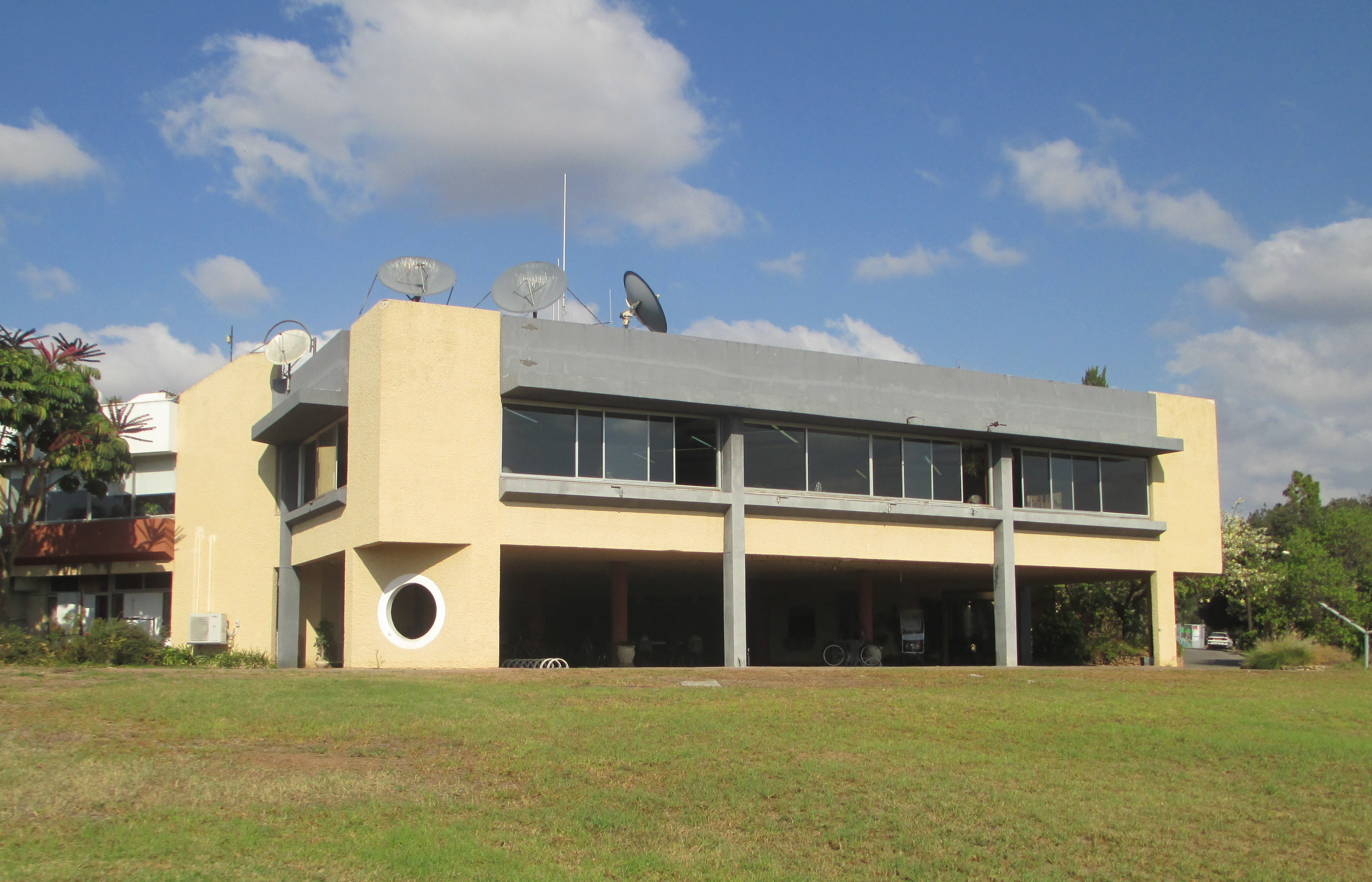
- Kibbutz dining room
- Etymology: House of the Valley
- Location within Northwest Israel Location within Israel
- Coordinates: 32°58′16″N 35°8′42″E
- Country: Israel
- District: Northern
- Subdistrict: Acre
- Council: Mateh Asher
- Affiliation: Kibbutz Movement
- Founded: 1949
- Founder: British Jews
- Population (2024): 890

Beit HaEmek (Hebrew: בֵּית הָעֵמֶק, lit. 'House of the Valley') is a kibbutz in northern Israel. Located in the western Galilee, it falls under the jurisdiction of Mateh Asher Regional Council. As of 2024 it had a population of 890.

== History ==
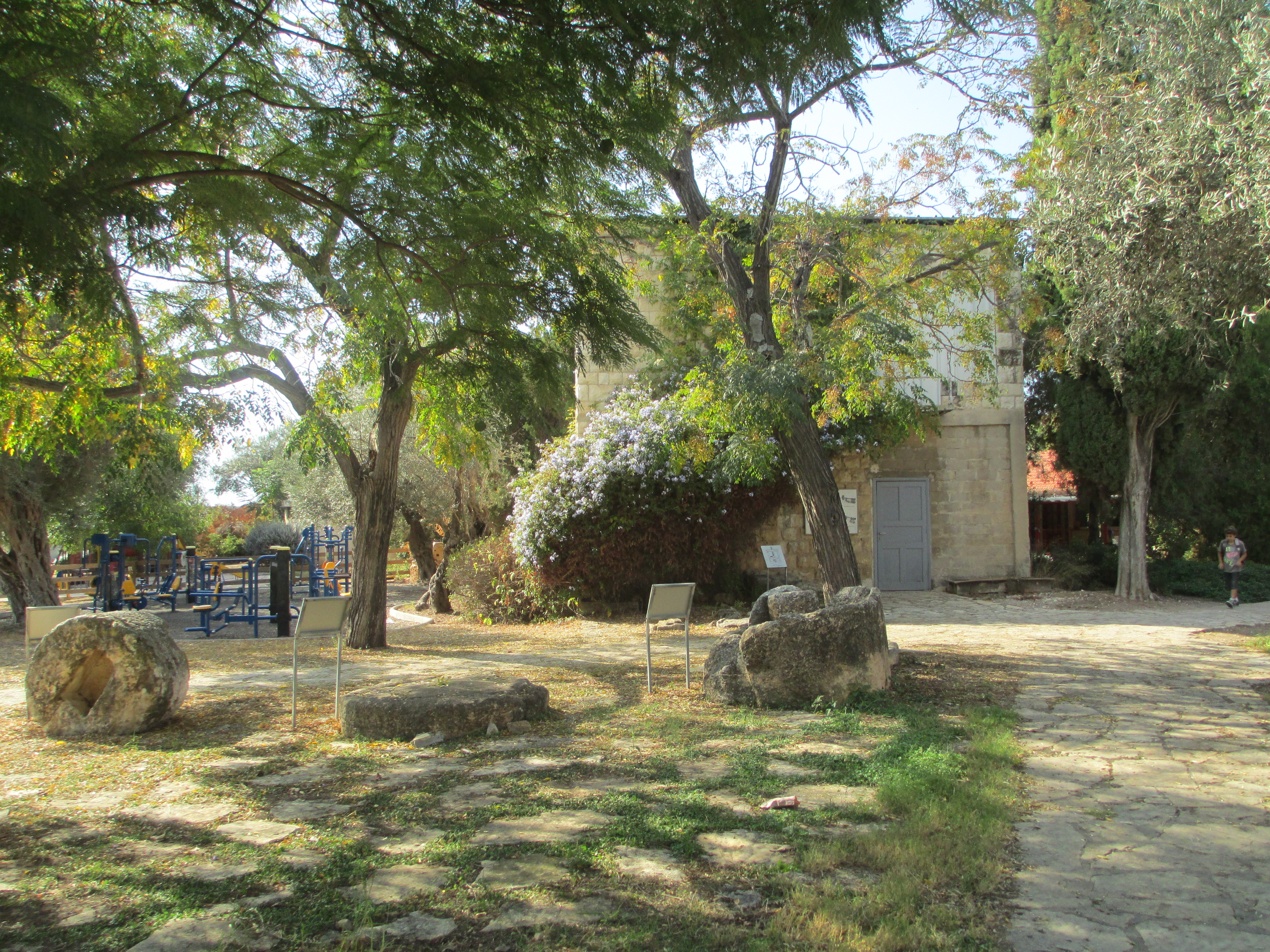
Beit HaEmek archaeological park

Kibbutz Beit HaEmek was established in 1949, in part by members of the British Habonim movement. Its name is derived from that of the nearby village of Amqa and the Biblical city of Beth-emek "included in Asher tribal allotment" mentioned in the Book of Joshua 19:27, which was located 5 kilometres north-east of the kibbutz. The kibbutz was built on land near the depopulated Palestinian village of Kuwaykat. In addition to agricultural activities, the kibbutz has scientific industry activities, such as Biological Industries, one of the world’s leading and trusted suppliers to the life sciences industry. In 2007 the kibbutz voted to privatize itself.

== Neta'im school ==
In 2018 a public elementary school, Beit Hinukh Neta'im, opened in Beit HaEmek, which serves as a regional school for Mateh Asher Regional Council alongside the Ma'ayanot school in Kabri

== Bibliography ==
- Gur, Yuval; Getzov, Nimrod (2011-09-26). "Bet Ha-'Emeq". Hadashot Arkheologiyot – Excavations and Surveys in Israel (123).
