= Baruch Zuckerman =

American-Zionist activist

- ברוך צוקרמן
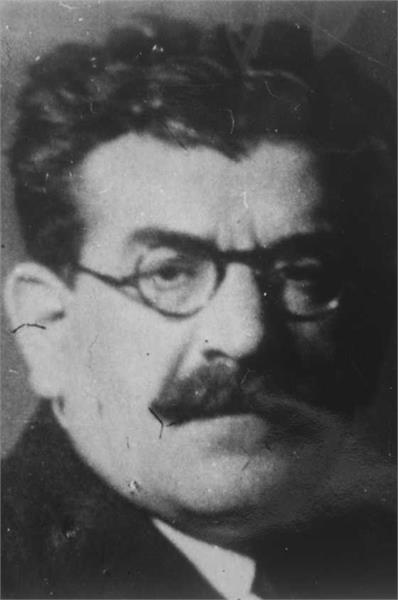
- Zuckerman in 1930
- Born: June 26, 1887; Kurenitz, Vilnius, Russian Empire (now Lithuania)
- Died: December 13, 1970 (aged 83); Jerusalem, Israel
- Spouse: Nina Avrunin
- Children: 2

Baruch Zuckerman (Hebrew: ברוך צוקרמן; June 26, 1887 – December 13, 1970) was an American-Israeli labor leader and journalist, one of the leading proponents of Yad Vashem, editor of Yiddishe Kempfer, a leading figure in the Farband and Histadrut campaigns, and president of the Labor Zionist Organization of America.

== Early life ==
Baruch was born into a poor family in the Hassidic village of Kurenitz, near Vilnius (then in Russia), the son of a peddler. His parents were Vigdor Chait and Sara, nee Levin. Most of the family later emigrated to the United States and changed their surname to Zuckerman. Yitzhak Zuckerman, one of the leaders of the Warsaw Ghetto Uprising, wrote in his memoirs that Baruch Zuckerman was his relative.

When Zuckerman was 15, he began to feel the first stirrings of Zionism. He became seriously interested in this fledgling ideology in August 1903 when he heard Theodor Herzl speak in Vilnius.

== Emigration to United States ==
In 1904, aged 16, Zuckerman arrived in the US, where he initially worked in a sweatshop in New York's garment district for $2 per week. It was there that he learned to put together sleeves and cuffs for men's shirts. Later, he graduated to piece work. But his heart was not in the job.

While Zuckerman had been propelled by an uncle towards the garment district, his father and older brother had gone into the scrap business. When his brother realized that there was no future for Zuckerman in the rag trade, he decided to set him up in an enterprise of his own and put a down payment on a candy store in his name. Zuckerman was not a success, and the candy store closed down after only nine months. In the meantime, it had become a popular venue for ideologists who gathered there to vent their Zionist fervour. They all belonged to transplanted Pinsk and Vilnius branches of Poale Zion as did Zuckerman himself. As his relationship with the candy store was drawing to a close, Zuckerman was elected a delegate to the founding convention of Poale Zion of America that took place on May 1, 1905. This was the beginning of his career as a servant of his people. As a key member of the Labor Zionist Movement of America, he was both a formulator of policy and one of its major exponents.

Passionately committed to social welfare, Zuckerman dreamt of uniting it with Zionism. The Poale Zion movement enabled him to do so. He was executive director of the People's Relief Committee from 1915 to 1924 when it disbanded, and accompanied Herbert Hoover and investment banker Herbert Lehman to Poland to bring food and clothing to survivors of World War I.

During that war, Zuckerman helped to organize the Jewish Legion and was also instrumental in setting up the American Jewish Congress. He was also the editor of Yiddishe Kempfer, and a leading figure in the Farband and Histadrut campaigns. In later years, he was elected Poale Zion representative to the Executive of the Jewish Agency in America and to the Executive of the World Jewish Congress. He was also president of the Labor Zionist Organization of America. A gifted writer and speaker, as well as an editor and journalist, he was one of the chief spokesman for the American Poale Zion around the world.

== Aliyah to Palestine ==
When the family came to Palestine in 1925, it was with the intention of settling permanently, but his daughter Avivah fell ill, a factor which forced the family to return to New York, where she could be properly treated.

It was not until 1932 that the Zuckermans finally made aliyah, and Avivah who had been studying at Hunter College in New York enrolled at the Hebrew University, becoming one of its first students of bacteriology. While his wife and daughters remained in Palestine, Baruch Zuckerman's many activities as an emissary precluded him from residing in Israel until his retirement in 1956.

After the Zuckermans moved to Jerusalem, where their daughter Nomi attended the Gymnasia Rehavia, their house became a meeting place for all the leading figures of the Zionist Movement. Golda Meir had to return to America with her two children because her daughter Sara had kidney trouble for which suitable treatment was not available in Palestine. Her husband, Morris Meyerson, stayed behind, and moved in with the Zuckermans.

== Return to United States ==
In August 1939, on the eve of Hitler's invasion of Poland, both Baruch and Nina Zuckerman were delegates to the 21st Zionist Congress in Geneva. They took Nomi with them. The Congress plenum decided that given the circumstances, the Zuckermans were of more value to the Zionist movement operating from America, than from Jerusalem. So they returned to New York, taking Nomi with them. Nomi spent the major part of the war years studying - first at Columbia University, then at the Tyler School of Fine Arts before returning to Jerusalem with her parents at the end of 1945.

== Yad Vashem ==
The idea of establishing a memorial in Palestine for Jewish victims of the Nazi Holocaust was conceived during World War II, as a response to reports of the mass murder of Jews in Nazi-occupied countries.

Yad Vashem was first proposed in September 1942, at a board meeting of the Jewish National Fund, by Mordecai Shenhavi, a member of Kibbutz Mishmar Ha'emek.

In August 1945, the plan was discussed in greater detail at a Zionist meeting in London where it was decided to set up a provisional board of Zionist leaders with David Remez as chairman, Shlomo Zalman Shragai, Baruch Zuckerman, and Shenhavi.

In February 1946, Yad Vashem opened an office in Jerusalem and a branch office in Tel Aviv and in June that year, convened its first plenary session. In July 1947, the First Conference on Holocaust Research was held at the Hebrew University in Jerusalem, where further plans were made for Yad Vashem. However, the outbreak in May 1948 of the War of Independence, brought almost all Yad Vashem operations to a standstill for two years.

== Later life ==
Zuckerman died in Jerusalem on December 13, 1970.

== Personal life ==
He married Nina Avrunin (born in Kiev). She was also a prominent Zionist.

Their daughter Avivah Zuckerman (1915-1977) was a poet, Haganah activist and later a Hebrew University professor of parasitology.

Their daughter Nomi Zuckerman is an artist, poet and translator.

== Sources ==
- Baruch Zuckerman's 1930 US passport, and a biography
