= Bruno Hussar =

Egyptian priest (1911–1996)

- برونو هسار
- Born: André Hussar; 5 May 1911; Cairo, Egypt
- Died: 8 February 1996 (aged 84); Jerusalem
- Citizenship: British, Egyptian, French, Israeli
- Education: École Centrale Paris
- Occupation: Priest of the Order of Preachers (from 1960)
- Known for: Jewish-Catholic relations Founder of Neve Shalom
- Notable work: Nostra aetate Decretum de Iudaeis

Bruno Hussar (Egyptian Arabic: برونو هسار, Hebrew: ברונו הוסאר; 5 May 1911 – 8 February 1996) was the founder of Neve Shalom / Wahat al-Salam ("Oasis of Peace"), an Arab/Jewish village in the no man's land between Israel and Palestine, dedicated to coexistence. Hussar derived the name from the book of Isaiah (32:18): "My people shall dwell in an oasis of peace". Born in Cairo, he converted to Roman Catholicism while studying engineering in France. He was a genuinely 'transnational, transcultural and multilingual' individual.

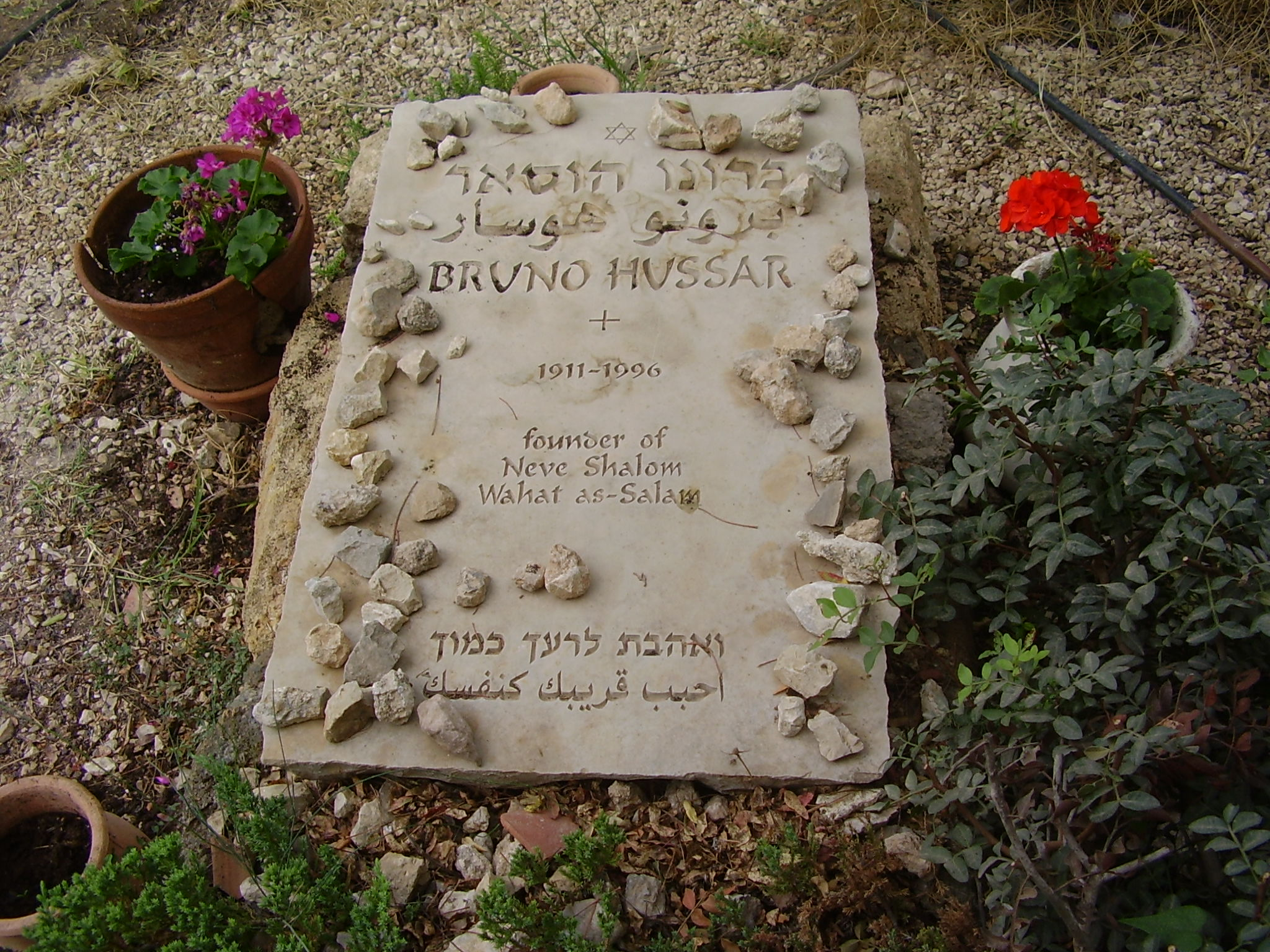
Grave of Bruno Hussar in Neve Shalom, Israel

Before he founded the village, Hussar established the House of Isaiah in Jerusalem, a Jewish-Catholic ecumenical study centre. He came to Jerusalem to establish this institution in 1952. For many years, he was also a leader and priest for the Hebrew Christians, a tiny congregation of Hebrew-speaking Catholic residents and Israeli Jewish converts to Catholicism.

== Early life and education ==
He was born, André, in Egypt in 1911, the son of a Hungarian father and a French mother, both assimilated Jews. He grew up speaking several languages and used to call himself a "man with four identities". On completing his secondary schooling at the Italian School in Cairo, he moved with his family to Paris, where he studied engineering. During his university studies, he was drawn to studying the problem of the nature of evil, and the figure of Jesus, and converted to Christianity. He received his French nationality in 1937.

== Career ==
The experience of World War II, awareness of antisemitic prejudice within his own confession, deepened his reflections, stirring an interest in his Jewish converso origins, and the desire to combine that heritage with his own adherence of the Catholic Church. This orientation was influenced notably through contacts with the philosemitic French-Catholic philosopher Jacques Maritain and his wife Raïssa. Refusing to disguise his Jewish origins, he was at risk in Nazi-occupied France and had to flee the country. At war's end, he studied philosophy in a Grenoble seminary and was ordained a Dominican priest on 16 July 1950, taking the name Bruno, after the founder of the Carthusian Order, Bruno of Cologne. He saw in the foundation of the state of Israel a step towards the fulfilment of a Christian salvific plan and was charged with establishing a Centre for the Study of Judaism in the Israeli sector of Jerusalem in 1953. He desired to establish a monastic brotherhood in Jerusalem as an anti-Torquemada symbol disavowing the persecutions of Jews, which the Spanish inquisitor (who was himself a Dominican with Jewish ancestors) had undertaken. He encountered considerable difficulties with the Latin Catholic Hierarchy of the Holy Land, whose members were predominantly of Arab origin, and assisted in the establishment of the St. James Association to cater to the minority of Jewish Catholics, a year later, on 14 December 1954, who were viewed with suspicion by Palestinian Catholics and marginalised by Israeli Jewish society. At the same time, he undertook pastoral care of the Jaffa Arab Catholic congregation, which deepened his awareness of the complexities of life for the Arab population in Israel.

In 1959, together with Brothers Jacques Fontaine and Marcel-Jacques Dubois, he opened St. Isaiah House, the aim of which was to foster dialogue and prayer between Christians and Jews. He obtained secret permission from the Vatican to have a Jewish wedding celebrated before the Catholic wedding was performed in 1960. He participated, with the support of Cardinal Bea in the work of the Second Vatican Council, where he helped draft the document, Decretum deo Iudaeis, which was to mark an important turning-point in Jewish–Catholic relations He greeted the reunification of Jerusalem subsequent to Israel's victory in the Six-Day War with joy, as a mark of eschatological significance and he became more markedly pro-Zionist, defining himself as a Christian, Jew and loyal citizen of the State of Israel. Israel's annexation of East Jerusalem, together with its occupation of both the West Bank and Gaza spurred Hussar with a sense of urgency to develop a process of reconciliation that would unite Jews, Christians and Muslims. This vision, according to Chiara Rioli, is to be distinguished from that of most Christian Zionist evangelical advocates like John Hagee, in that the event is not understood to foreshadow the apocalyptic Second Coming of Christ.

He originally proposed setting up a new interfaith centre, an "oasis of peace" modelled on the kibbutz, on the slopes of Kiryat Ye'arim by Abu Ghosh, but decided to settle on larger grounds, some ten hectares (25 acres), owned by the Trappist order of the Latrun Abbey, on no man's land according to the 1949 armistice lines, and equidistant from the three cities central to Judaism, Christianity and Islam, of Jerusalem, Tel Aviv and Ramallah, implying thereby the 'equal proximity to the three Abrahamic religions of the Holy Land.

== Identity ==
'I feel I have four selves: I really am a Christian and a Priest, I really am a Jew, I really am an Israeli and if I don’t feel I really am an Egyptian, I do at least feel very close to the Arabs who I know and love."

== Foundation of Neve Shalom/Wahat Al-Salam ==
An earlier attempt had been made by two families of the St. James Association to build a Christian kibbutz, on land provided by the Sisters of Our Lady of Sion in Ein Kerem in the 1950s. Worries existed about the reactions of the nearby Arab villagers, and of the Israeli government, though the abbot of the Latrun monastery, Elie Corbisier, was enthusiastic. Hussar, assisted by letters to the Pope written by Rina Geftman, sought not patronage, but formal authorisation for his projected Yishuv Neve Shalom from the then Latin Patriarch of Jerusalem, Alberto Gori (1949–1970), who was opposed to the plan. A feasibility study by the Patriarchate advised against the project, but Hussar and Corbisier went ahead, signing a lease on 6 November 1970, and implemented it, despite resistance from the new head of the Jerusalem Patriarchate, Giacomo Giuseppe Beltritti.

NSWAS - the name came from a phrasing in Pope Paul VI's address bidding Israel's then-president Zalman Shazar farewell on January 5, 1964- began to be developed on 400 dunams of land, under harsh pioneering conditions, by some ten members of the same group in 1970, though the first families only arrived in 1976. With the advent of Israeli Jewish and Palestinian Arab families after 1976, and the moral and financial support of Friends of NSWAS in France, Italy, Switzerland and Belgium, the community began to grow. Wellesley Aron and his wife joined the village in 1980. Though prayer and reconciliation were considered fundamental from the beginning, a new tendency arose, as settlers showed more interest in justice and fraternity, and in social action, than religion. Hussar imposed from the very outset a politics of neutrality. Issues of identity nonetheless came to the fore as a central concern of the community, something which led to rifts, and indeed the abandonment of the project by one of its key founding members, Rina Geftman, in the 1980s. By 1984, the village had 70 members, equally divided between Jewish and Palestinian Israelis.

== Mixed schools ==
In the late 1990s, the Center established several Yad b’Yad (Hand in Hand) schools in Israel, aiming to encourage Jewish and Arab children to study together.

== School of Peace ==
In response to the need to educate the Israeli Jewish and Palestinian children in the village, a school was set up with a bilingual curriculum in both Hebrew and Arabic, English French before the children left primary school to enter the Israeli state school system. The School of Peace, with input from Northern Ireland's educational system and elsewhere, was established in 1979, and also emerged from this pedagogic necessity. Throughout the 1980s, the NSWAS model was widely covered, both by the international and local Israeli press, for its role in promoting dialogue in the midst of the ongoing Israeli–Palestinian conflict. The stress on neutrality nonetheless came under considerable strain in the 1980s, during Israel's "First Lebanon War", and especially after the outbreak of the First Intifada. Hussar refrained from taking any public stand, though he did write in his 1988 book, When the cloud lifted, that the Intifada was:

"a natural consequence of growing pressure on the 'territories', due to the Occupation and Jewish settlements – and it has given rise to inevitable and harsh military repression."

At this time, a Nazareth Muslim resident and friend, Abdessalam Najjar, began to assume, as village secretary, a larger leadership role. As a result, the village staged a one-off, exceptional protest against the oppression in Palestine. Hussar's own dedication to Zionism did not change. He thought the Jews had a right, sanctioned by the United Nations, to live in a land of their own. At the same time, he declared

In itself Zionism in not in any way against the right of the Palestinian Arabs to a national existence in the same region; the land is spacious enough for that. (…) No Jew who truly lives in the spirit of the Torah can be indifferent to the fate of the Palestinian Arabs and their hopes. This land is their home too.”

== Meditation and prayer building ==
In 1983, NSWAS opened a huge building, later capped with a white dome and set apart, within a landscaped garden environment, called the Doumia (silence in Biblical Hebrew). Hussar made a precise semantic distinction in Hebrew between sheket (absence of noise) and dumia (profound silence), associating the latter with the 'freshet of air, the voice of a subtle silence' Elijah heard in the desert according to the Book of Kings (19:12). In his later years, Hussar withdrew there, returning to his foundational notion of a place where prayer and meditation would play a formative role within his community, as the point of conjunction between the three Abrahamic faiths. He was even more culturally ecumenical, learning from a Japanese priest how to perform mass while practising zazen. He was to break his retreat into silence on hearing of the news of the Assassination of Yitzhak Rabin, which struck him as putting an end to illusions created by the peace previously envisaged as a result of the Oslo I Accord. He interpreted the assassination biblically as a sign of aharit ha-yamim, the end of days, and

'a major step forward in the march of the Jewish people towards messianic fullness. . .when the Jews and the Gentiles, trees that complement God’s single olive tree, will be united in the same praise.'

== Death and heritage ==
On the occasion of Brother Hussar's death, 8 February 1996, and burial at Neve Shalom, thousands of people only from Israel, gathered at NSWAS. Hussar was nominated in successive years (1988, 1989) for the Nobel Peace Prize. Until 1989, the village lacked recognition as an Israeli village, but in September of that year the Israeli Ministry of the Interior finally granted it that legal status. Difficulties arose in the increasingly conflicted years that followed, esp. during the Al Aqsa Intifada, as NSWAS found itself isolated, unable to forge significant connections with either Israeli or Palestinian society. His friend of long-standing Dubois, went on record as stating that both he and Hussar, in embarking on a naïve adventurous Zionism, had 'completely denied the Palestinian tragedy'.

== Works ==
- Autobiography: When the Cloud Lifted

== See also ==
- Gregory Baum — Nostra aetate co-author
- John M. Oesterreicher — Nostra aetate co-author
