= Neve Shalom =

Village in Israel

Neve Shalom - Wahat as-Salam: נְוֵה שָׁלוֹם (Hebrew); واحة السلام (Arabic)
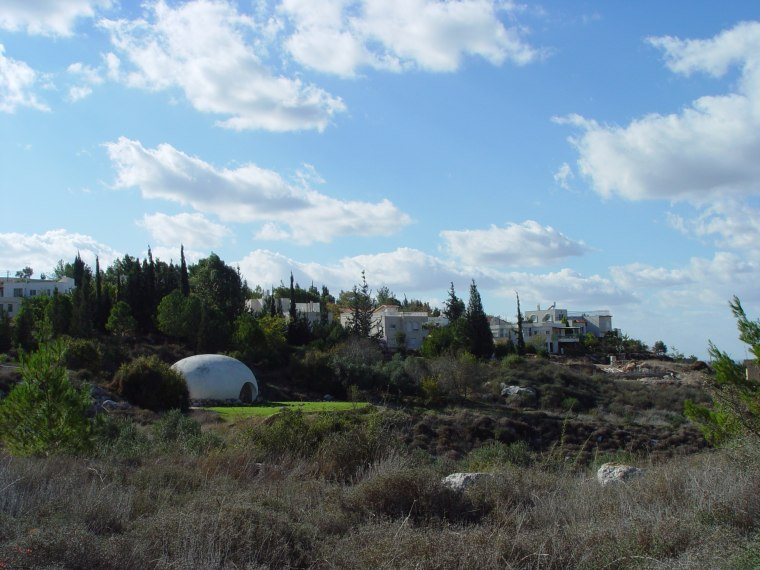
- View of the village

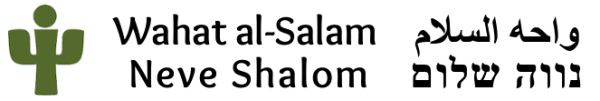
- Etymology: Oasis of Peace
- Location within Jerusalem District Location within Israel
- Coordinates: 31°49′4″N 34°58′47″E
- Country: Israel
- District: Jerusalem
- Council: Mateh Yehuda
- Founded: 1969
- Population (2024): 331
- Website: nswas.org

Neve Shalom (Hebrew: נְוֵה שָׁלוֹם, lit. 'Oasis of Peace'), also known as Wahat as-Salam (Arabic: واحة السلام) is a cooperative village in Israel, jointly founded by Israeli Jews and Arabs in an attempt to show that the two peoples can live side by side peacefully, as well as to conduct educational work for peace, equality and understanding between the two peoples. The village is located on one of the two Latrun hilltops overlooking the Ayalon Valley, and lies midway between Tel Aviv and Jerusalem. Falling under the jurisdiction of Mateh Yehuda Regional Council, in 2024 it had a population of 331.

== History ==
The name Neve Shalom is taken from a passage in the Isaiah 32:18: "My people shall dwell in an oasis of peace".

The village was the brainchild of Father Bruno Hussar. Born in Egypt the son of non-practicing Jews, he converted to Christianity while studying engineering in France. Witnessing at first hand the vitriolic antisemitism of wartime France sharpened his awareness of his Jewish roots. He joined the Dominican Order, was ordained into the priesthood in 1950, and sent to Jerusalem to establish a centre for Jewish studies in 1953, where he obtained Israeli citizenship in 1966. In 1970, in order to promote ecumenical interfaith dialogue, he obtained forty hectares (120 acres) of terrain classified as no man's land in the Latrun salient, at a 'peppercorn rent' of 3 pence a year on a 100-year lease from the local Trappist abbey. The area was desolate, treeless, unwatered and covered with brambles, and had not been under cultivation since the Byzantine period. At the outset foreigners came to share the experience with him, but few remained beyond one or two months, save for Anne LeMeignon who settled in a hut and stayed on.

Hussar's project envisaged the creation of a sociocultural framework that would enable residents to live on terms of equality and mutual respect while conserving the distinct cultural heritage, language and sense of identity each individual brought to the community from the complex mosaic of Palestine's historic communities. At the same time, it would be designed to function as a school of peace where people from all over the country could learn to listen to each other.

In Hussar's own words:

"We had in mind a small village composed of inhabitants from different communities in the country. Jews, Christians and Muslims would live there in peace, each one faithful to his own faith and traditions, while respecting those of others. Each would find in this diversity a source of personal enrichment.".

Conditions were harsh, and at first Hussar lived in a bus on the site. Even basic facilities like a bathroom were lacking, and showers could be taken only by driving once a week the 10 kilometres (6.2 mi) to kibbutz Nachshon. The first five families, four Jewish and one Palestinian settled there in 1978, dwelling in tents. Among the early members (from November 1980) was Major Wellesley Aron, grandfather of the Israeli singer David Broza. Says David Broza: "The group of people that my grandfather joined saw the place as an opportunity to expand on the idea of finding peace within yourself as a prelude to bringing peace to the community and the region". The School for Peace was established in 1978. The founding families came mainly from a secular background. The Neve Shalom-Wahat as-Salam model earned both the 1989 Beyond War Award, and a Giraffe Heroes Award, and inspired the 1992 birth of the sustained Jewish-Palestinian Living Room Dialogue Group in the United States.

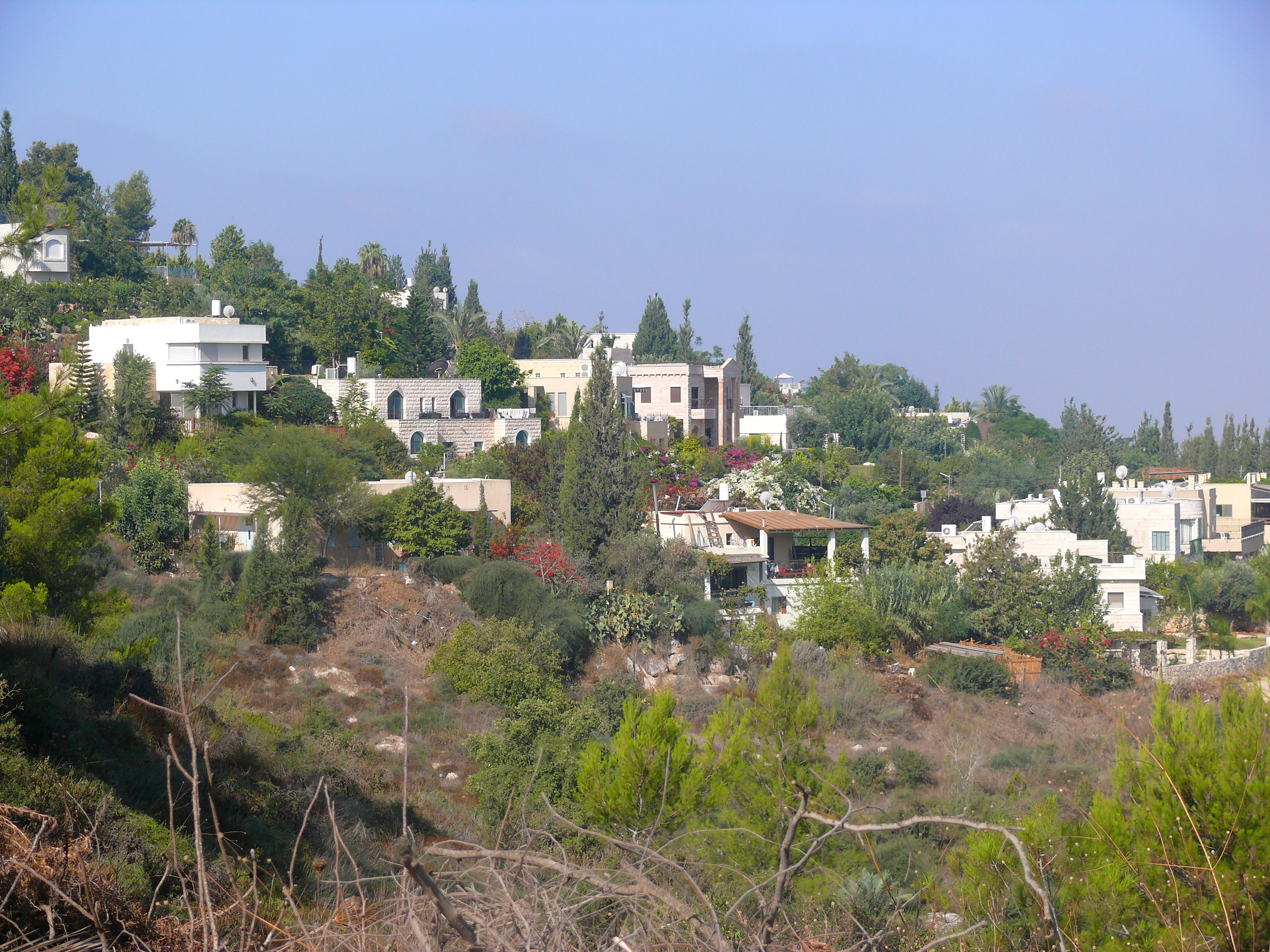
Neve Shalom, Jewish-Arab village in Israel

For years it survived as an orphan community devoid of official assistance. In 1994, after lobbying by foreign supporters and the American diplomat Samuel W. Lewis, the Israeli government had a change of heart and began to provide subsidies, and extended legal status to the village as a municipality. As a result, it earned autonomous zoning rights. The "School of Peace" closed down in a month-long strike, in protest and mourning, at the outbreak of the Al Aqsa Intifada in 2000, and made efforts to provide welfare for Palestinians as the violence spread.

While assimilation is not promoted, intermarriage is not disapproved of, though instances are rare. The preference is for each community to maintain its distinct identity. The forging of a convivial bicultural identity has not erased difficulties. Even in schooling, Grace Feuerverger's account documents, achingly painful tensions do arise in relationships as children, teachers and families interact. One resident stated the issue in the following terms:

The Neve Shalom/Wahat Al-Salam experience humanizes the conflict. It is called an oasis, but only as compared to other areas in the country. The village has many difficulties but at least we are not being broken. We do have personal squabbles as in any village, but we are living the conflict instead of fighting it.

To mark the advent of the new millennium, towards the end of the 1990s the Trappist monastery decided to hand over half the land, some 20 hectares (50 acres), to Neve Shalom/Wahat as-Salam as an outright gift to its residents.

In May 2010, a sign was posted outside the village decrying the deaths of human rights activists during the Gaza flotilla raid. The wording of the sign originally described the deaths as "murder" but was subsequently changed to "killing" to better reflect the village consensus. The following month Arutz Sheva reported that a rift had broken out between Jews and Arabs over this issue and threats had been made to expel the Jewish residents. On its website, the community wrote that the initiative was undertaken and authorized democratically by both Jewish and Palestinian members of the village. In July of the same year, the community organized a joint Jewish-Palestinian conference on human rights which was attended by speakers ranging from Gideon Levy to Neve Gordon and Ziv Hadas, Executive Director for Physicians for Human Rights.

In a price tag attack in 2012, the tires of 14 vehicles were punctured and some of the vehicles were painted with anti-Palestinian graffiti.”

Community cohesion in the village has struggled after the October 7th attacks by Hamas and Israel's subsequent war against Gaza. Historically, about half of Neve Shalom's Jewish residents have served in the Israel Defense Forces, while another half have resisted the draft. To the community's knowledge, no Palestinian resident of the village has served in the IDF. Palestinian citizens of Israel are not obligated to serve, though they may if they volunteer. There are rumors that more of Neve Shalom's Jews have signed up to serve additional periods in the IDF after October 7th, and according to Jewish and Palestinian residents alike, the village is mostly silent on the topic of the war.

== Demographics ==
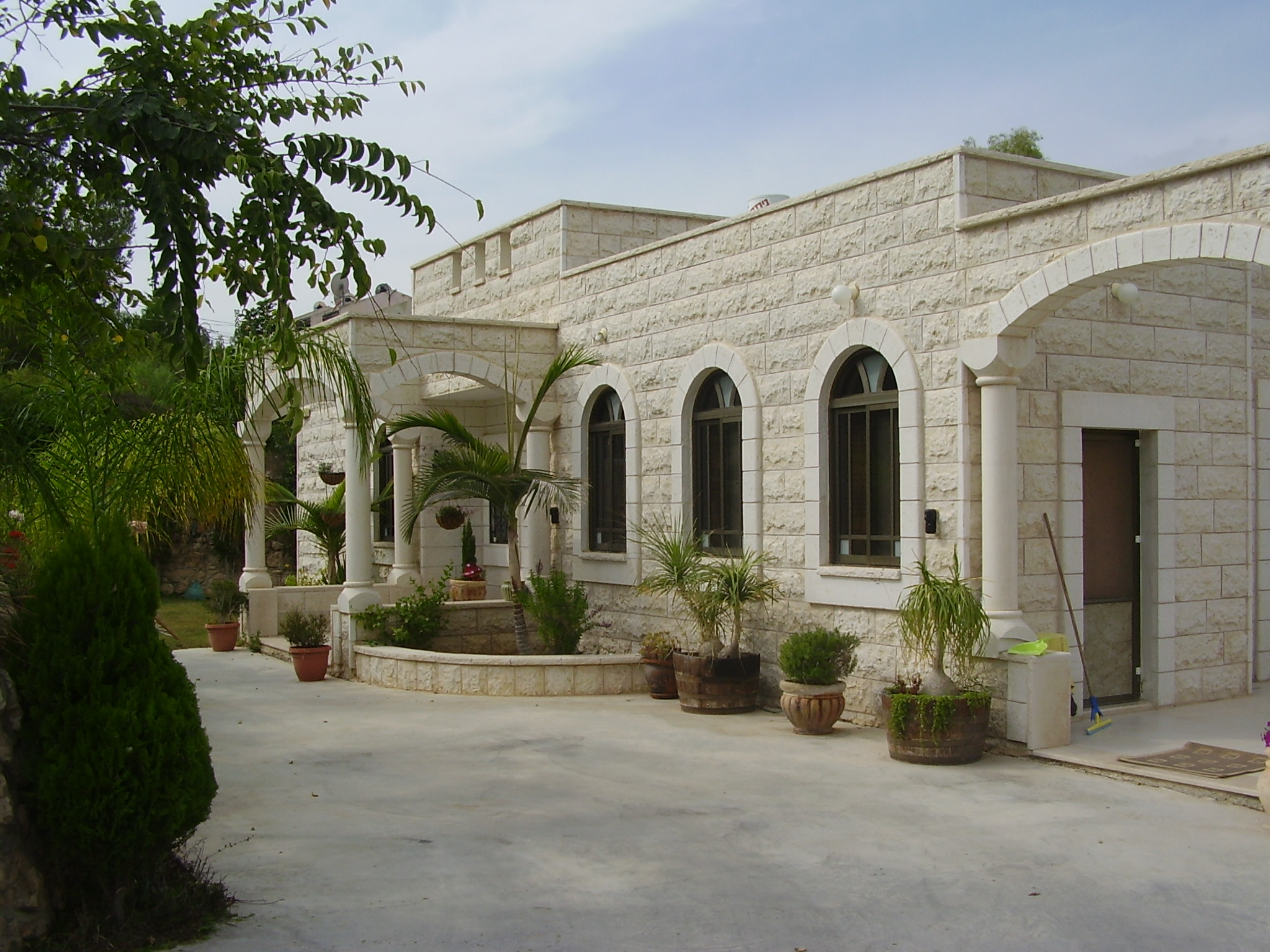
Home in Neve Shalom

The village is home (as of 2010) to some sixty families. By principle, half of the inhabitants are Jews, the rest are Muslim and Christian Israeli Arabs. Another 300 Jewish and Arab families remain on the waiting list for settlement in the community. A recently approved expansion plan will permit the village to grow in coming years by another 92 housing lots. Since its founding, the village has had a regular rotation of international volunteers brought in to provide basic support functions at its various facilities.

== Administrative structure ==
The community is run by a steering committee or secretariat which, like its subcommittees, is elected by an annual democratic vote. The head of the secretariat effectively serves as the mayor of the village. In addition there are several internal committees to run the various activities of the village. A numerical balance is consistently observed between Jewish and Arab representatives. Rotation however is not observed, and since 1995 the village administrator has always been an Arab. Jewish classes in the village school each have both a Jewish and an Arab teacher, but this does not extend to the curriculum, where maths, for example, is taught to children in their respective native languages. When matters of principle are on the agenda, a plenum, made up of all full members of the village, is constituted to deliberate, and its final decisions are binding on everyone. Since the adult Jewish residents are not equally fluent in Arabic, the minutes of official deliberations are taken down in Hebrew and workshops are conducted in Hebrew to account for what Rabah Halabi describes as a large gap between "proclaimed policy and the actual situation," and Feuerverger, using the theories of Paolo Freire, illustrates that language issues refract problems of power.

== Education ==
According to Grace Feuerverger, Neve Shalom/Wahat as-Salam's emancipatory education 'has become a global role model of intercultural harmony, of teaching and learning to live together in peace.' There are three educational institutions in the village;

- A bi-national, bi-lingual (Arabic–Hebrew) children's educational framework, from preschool to eighth grade, with an enrollment (2009–2010) of 250. About 90% of the pupils come from towns and villages in a 30 kilometres (19 mi) radius of Neve Shalom ~ Wahat as-Salam. The largest unit in the children's educational framework is the primary school, founded in 1984 as the first such bi-national school in the country. Today, the school is recognized and receives some support from the state.
- The School for Peace: a unique educational institution offering Jewish-Arab encounter programs in the spirit of Neve Shalom ~ Wahat as-Salam. Founded in 1979, the SFP has conducted workshops, seminars and courses for some 35,000 youth and adults from Israel and the Palestinian territories. The School for Peace also trains facilitators in conflict-group encounter skills. Its teachers workshop has obtained accreditation from the Ministry of Education for in-service training.
- The Pluralistic Spiritual Centre in Memory of Bruno Hussar, known as the "House of Silence" ("Beit Dumia/Bayt Sakinah"), is a place and a framework for spiritual reflection on issues at the core of the Middle East conflict and the search for its resolution. The Centre conducts a variety of activities and seminars that are open to the general public. Muslims conduct Friday prayers, Jews, Sabbath services, and Christians worship there on Sundays.

== Economy and culture ==
The village also has a small guest house, offering programs aimed at acquainting local or foreign groups with the village and its cultural context. On June 22, 2006, Pink Floyd frontman Roger Waters played a live concert at the village, attracting over 50,000 fans.

The Neve Shalom project has drawn a wide range of evaluations: some hail its exemplary function as a regional model for co-existence, while others dismiss the experiment. In the Middle East Quarterly in 1998, Joseph Montville took it as 'encouraging evidence of a genuine, grass-roots peace process.' Documenting its extensive work in networking to teach and train students from schools and universities on both sides of the border, he cited it as an effective part of two-track diplomacy, while noting that both religious and secular extremists from both sides prefer no contact with the "other", and other Israelis, while not dismissive, regard it as a naïve, impractical fantasy. Edward Alexander, in reply, dismissed Montville's positive assessment. Building bridges between Jews and Arabs for mutual understanding ignores the fact, he argues, that both are fully cognizant of each other, with Arabs denying Jewish sovereignty while Jews refuse to renounce it. Neve Shalom can only exist if Jews suppress their Zionism in an act of self-abasement similar to that of the 'trembling ghetto Jew', while Arabs observe the deference gleefully. Montville's evidence shows a case where a Jewish boy absorbed guilt in an act of 'prodigious sympathy' while his Palestinian counterpart exuded rage. What is forgotten, he concluded, is that 'it was not the Israeli occupation that led to Arab hatred, but Arab hatred and aggression that led to that occupation.' Ahmad Yusuf, director of a U.S.-based Islamist think tank, emphasizes the limits of dialogue concerning reciprocal negative stereotypes. One weeps at Neve Shalom, he notes. Addressing security concerns through techniques of crisis resolution and social psychology, however, is not sufficient. Real success, in Palestinian terms, would consist of problem-solving focused not only on security, but also justice and equality. Optimally this requires a federal binational state. Yusuf concluded with the citation of an Arab proverb. In it a boy notices a butcher weeping as he slaughters a lamb. His father tells him to focus not on the tears, but the knife in his hand.

H. Svi Shapiro assesses Neve Shalom's aspirations to provide a civic achievement of citizens enjoying equal status and rights, and concludes that "Neve Shalom/Wahat Al-Salam provides no definitive solution to this conundrum. It does allow us, however, to see how one group of courageous, idealistic, and thoughtful individuals is struggling to mediate the tensions inherent in this situation."

== See also ==
- Givat Haviva
- HaKfar HaYarok
- Hand in Hand: Center for Jewish Arab Education in Israel
- Intentional community

== Bibliography ==
- Alexander, Edward (December 1998). "No, an Exercise in Jewish Self-Debasement". Middle East Quarterly. Vol. V, no. 4. pp. 28–30.
- Aron, Wellesley (1992). Silman-Cheong, Helen (ed.). Rebel with a Cause: A Memoir. Veritas Publications. ISBN 978-0-853-03245-8.
- Ashford, Mary-Wynne; Dauncey, Guy (2006). Enough Blood Shed: 101 Solutions to Violence, Terror and War. New Society Publishers. ISBN 978-0-865-71527-1.
- Feuerverger, Grace (2001). Oasis of Dreams: Teaching and Learning Peace in a Jewish-Palestinian Village in Israel. Routledge. ISBN 978-0-415-92939-4.
- Feuerverger, Grace (2011). "Teaching for the Love of it: an education professor's narrative at the crossroad of language, culture, and identity". In Kitchen, Julian; Parker, Darlene Ciuffetelli; Pushor, Debbie (eds.). Narrative Inquiries into Curriculum Making in Teacher Education. Emerald Group Publishing. pp. 71–89. ISBN 978-0-857-24591-5.
- Gavron, Daniel (2008). "Living together". Holy Land Mosaic:Stories of Cooperation and Coexistence Between Israelis and Palestinians. Rowman & Littlefield. pp. 57–72. ISBN 978-0-742-54013-2.
- Halabi, Rabah; Zak, Michal (2004). "Language as a bridge and obstacle". In Halabi, Rabah (ed.). Israeli and Palestinian Identities in dialogue: The School for Peace Approach. Rutgers University Press. pp. 119–140. ISBN 978-0-813-53415-2.
- Hasson, Nir; Rosenberg, Oz (8 June 2012). "Racist graffiti sprayed at mixed Jewish-Arab village in central Israel". Haaretz. Archived from the original on 8 June 2012.
- Hussar, Bruno (1989). When the Cloud Lifted (Quand la nuée se levait). Veritas Publications. pp. 57–72. ISBN 978-1-85390-048-8.
- ICBS (2010). Population by settlement. Government of Israel.
- JPost (22 July 2006). "Thousands flock to Waters concert". Jerusalem Post.
- Montville, Joseph V. (December 1998). "Neve Shalom: A Model of Arab-Israeli Coexistence?". Middle East Quarterly. Vol. V, no. 4. pp. 21–28.
- Ronen, Gil (13 June 2010). "'Peace' Village Torn by Flotilla". Arutz Sheva.
- Salinas, Moises (2007). Planting Hatred, Sowing Pain: The Psychology of the Israeli-Palestinian Conflict. Greenwood Publishing Group. ISBN 978-0-275-99005-3.
- Shapiro, H. Svi (2010). "All we are saying. Identity, Communal Strife, and the Possibility of Peace". In Chapman, Daniel Ethan (ed.). Examining Social Theory: Crossing Borders/Reflecting Back. Peter Lang. pp. 101–114. ISBN 978-1-433-10479-4.
- Yusuf, Ahmad (December 1998). "No, but a Useful Step toward Bi-Nationalism". Middle East Quarterly. Vol. V, no. 4. pp. 30–32.
