= Nale =

Nale may refer to:

- Abia Nale (born 1986), South African footballer
- Nale Boniface (born 1993), Tanzanian beauty pageant winner
- Nale language, also known as Atchin, a dialect of Uripiv spoken in Vanuatu
- Nale, a character in the webcomic The Order of the Stick

== See also ==
- Nail (disambiguation)
- Na'aleh (disambiguation)
