= Marcel-Jacques Dubois =

French-Israeli theologian and philosopher

The Reverend Marcel-Jacques Dubois OP
- Born: 1920
- Died: 2007 (aged 86–87)
- Occupations: Theologian, professor of philosophy
- Awards: Israel Prize (1996)

Academic work
- Discipline: Theology, Philosophy
- Sub-discipline: Catholic-Jewish relations
- Institutions: Hebrew University of Jerusalem

Marcel-Jacques Dubois, OP (1920–2007) was a French academic and theologian of the Dominican Order and a naturalized citizen of Israel.

He was linked to Bruno Hussar's House of Isaiah and involved in relations between Catholicism and Judaism. He was professor of philosophy at the Hebrew University of Jerusalem (where he served as chairman of department) and was on the 1974 Commission of the Holy See for Religious Relations with the Jews.

Dubois also had significance as a Dominican theologian who rejected supersessionism. He spent much of his life in Israel and Teddy Kollek declared him an "Honored Citizen of Jerusalem". He also participated in a series of televised debates with Israeli thinker Yeshayahu Leibowitz. In 1996, he won the Israel Prize for his academic work on Israeli society.
