= Iakov Mikhailovich Shafir =

Iakov Mikhailovich Shafir (1886 - 26 April, 1938) (Russian: Яков Михайлович Шафир) was a Bolshevik historian. He was murdered during Stalin's Great Purge.

Shafir joined the Bolshevik faction of the Russian Social Democratic Labour Party in 1903. He remained active with them until 1917 when he joined the Right Socialist Revolutionary Party.

== Arrest and death ==
Shafir was arrested on 15 March 1938 on charges of "participation in a counter-revolutionary organization". He was tried by the Military Collegium of the Supreme Court of the USSR and sentenced to death. He was shot on 26 April at the Butovo firing range.
