= Camp Gesher =

Jewish summer camp in Ontario, Canada

- מחנה גשר

Location
- Pringle Lake, Cloyne, Ontario
- Coordinates: 44°51′57″N 77°12′30″W

Information
- Type: Jewish summer camp
- Established: 1963; 62 years ago
- Website: campgesher.com

Camp Gesher (Hebrew: מַחֲנֶה גֶּשֶׁר) is a Jewish summer camp near Cloyne, Ontario. It is a member of the Habonim Dror Zionist youth movement and the Ontario Camping Association.

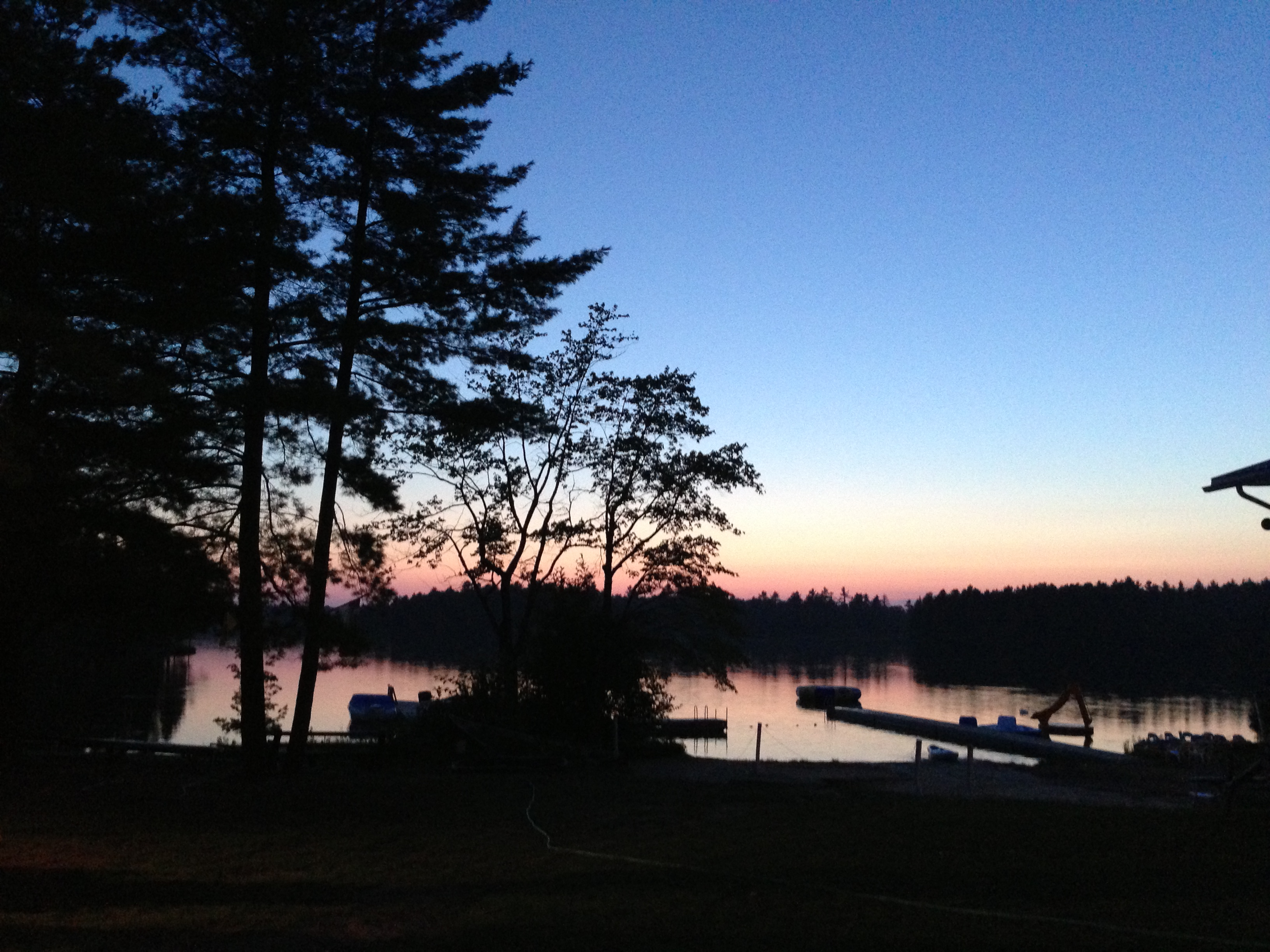
View of Lake Pringle from Camp Gesher

Camp Gesher originated in 1963 as a member of the Dror Hachalutz Hatzair Zionist Youth Organization, a merger of Camp Revivim (serving campers from Ottawa and Toronto) and Camp Kissufim (serving campers from Montreal). Gesher was the first camp to test the merging of the Habonim and Dror Youth Movements in 1975. It is currently under the leadership of Amit Rakoff-Bellman

== Literary references ==
The Program, a novel by Hal Niedzviecki, takes place in part at Camp Gesher.
