= Camp Na'aleh =

Defunct Habonim Dror summer camp

Coordinates: 42°2′6.7″N 75°32′16.3″W

Camp Na'aleh (Hebrew: מַחֲנֶה נַעֲלֶה) was one of seven summer camps in North America run by the Labor Zionist youth movement Habonim Dror. Founded in 1932, it was the oldest of Habonim Dror North America's summer camps. Camp Na'aleh had its final summer in 2016.

== History ==
Na'aleh was established as Camp Kvutza by the Young Poale Zion Alliance (YPZA) in 1932. That August, 14 YPZA members lived together in a tent in Highland Mills, New York. With the help of Golda Meyerson (who later changed her name to Golda Meir), Camp Kvutza secured a permanent location in Accord, New York, the following summer. The Young Poale Zion Alliance established Habonim as its children's movement in 1935.

After the summer season in 1939 was troubled by issues of access to the swimming hole, it was decided to find a new location for the 1940 summer. A site in Killingworth, Connecticut, was chosen. Later, Camp Kvutza was located near Amenia, New York, for several summers.

Camp Kvutza changed its name to Camp Habonim and moved to Red Hook, New York, in 1953. In 1962, Camp Habonim changed its name to Na'aleh. Na'aleh relocated to Elizaville, New York, in 1968, where it remained until 1984, when it ceased operations due to low registration and related financial difficulties.

In 1998, Habonim Dror re-opened Na'aleh. For three summers, it used rented facilities in Holmes, New York; then it rented space in Shohola, Pennsylvania. In 2008, Na'aleh moved to a campsite in Sidney, New York, where it operated for 7 summers before the summer of 2015 when it moved to a campsite in Windsor, New York and where it remained for its final two summers of operation.

== Culture ==
Na'aleh tried to simulate a kibbutz environment in which chanichim (campers) lived according to Habonim Dror ideals such as cooperation, equality, and Jewish and Labor Zionist values. Every day except Shabbat, campers performed avodah (work) to improve the camp, such as picking up trash, cleaning the bathrooms, painting, washing dishes, or making repairs to the buildings. Campers were taught Hebrew, Jewish and Israeli history, and learned about social justice issues in the United States and Israel.

== Age groups ==
- Amelim – Post 2nd, 3rd, 4th graders
- Chotrim – Post 5th and 6th graders
  - Amelim and Chotrim are sometimes broken into Chalutzim (post 2nd, 3rd, 4th, 5th graders) and Shomrim (post 6th graders)
- Tzofim – Post 7th graders
- Bonim – Post 8th graders
- Bogrim – Post 9th graders
- MBI – Post 10th graders
- MADATZ (abbreviation for Madrichim tzair, lit. "young guides") (CIT) – Post 11th graders
