= Habonim Dror =

International socialist-zionist youth movement

- הַבּוֹנִים דְּרוֹר
- Predecessor: Habonim, Dror
- Formation: 1982
- Type: Jewish Labour Zionist youth movement
- Website: https://www.habonimdror.org/

Habonim Dror (Hebrew: הַבּוֹנִים דְּרוֹר, "the builders–freedom") is a Jewish Labor Zionist youth movement. It was formed in 1982 through the merger of two earlier movements: Habonim and Dror.

Dror (Hebrew: דְּרוֹר, "freedom") originated in Poland in 1915 as an offshoot of the Tze'irei Zion (Youth Of Zion) youth movement. After the majority of Tze'irei Zion merged with Hashomer in 1913 to form Hashomer Hatzair, members who did not join the new organization founded Dror. The movement was influenced by the Russian Narodniks' philosophy.

Habonim (Hebrew: הַבּוֹנִים, "the builders") was established in 1929 in the United Kingdom and later expanded to other English-speaking countries. While each national branch developed independently, they maintained a shared ideology centered on Jewish and Labor Zionist cultural values.

During World War II, members of Dror were active in resistance efforts, including participation in the Warsaw Ghetto Uprising. Dror members, including Mordechai Tenenbaum, organized underground factions in the Białystok Ghetto.

Dror was affiliated with HaKibbutz HaMeuhad, while Habonim was aligned with the Ichud kibbutzim. Following the 1980 merger of these kibbutz movements into the United Kibbutz Movement, their youth movements also united, resulting in the formation of Habonim Dror.

== Ideology ==
Habonim Dror is a Labor Zionist cultural youth movement that seeks to connect young Jews through Jewish cultural activities. One of its central concepts is tikkun olam ("mending the world").

The movement’s ideology encompasses several interrelated categories: Judaism, chalutziut (pioneering, particularly through aliyah to Israel and settlement on kibbutzim), collective action and mutual support based on Labor Zionist principles, and self-realization.

Habonim Dror promotes its ideals through various activities such as scouting, camping, hiking, and educational programs focused on the geography and history of the Land of Israel. Emphasis is also placed on Jewish history, as well as cultural traditions such as songs and dances from the yishuv period. Socialist values are reflected in the movement’s focus on kibbutz life and initiatives related to irbutz (urban communal living).

== The Six Pillars ==
The North American branch of Habonim Dror is structured around six core principles, referred to as "pillars": Judaism, Labor Zionism, socialism, social justice, Collective Liberation of the Peoples of Israel-Palestine (CLPIP), and Hagshama (commonly translated as "actualization"), which emphasizes the realization of the movement’s values through action. Judaism is listed first among the pillars, reflecting the movement’s identity as a Jewish organization focused on the development of the State of Israel through collective and collaborative efforts. CLPIP is a new pillar added during Veida 2024.

=== Judaism ===
While not an overtly religious organization, Habonim Dror emphasizes the significance of cultural Judaism. The movement generally observes Shabbat and marks the end of the week with the Havdalah ceremony.

When Habonim was established in London, its initial focus was based on two foundational principles: Judaism and scouting. Over time, its ideology expanded to include Labor Zionism, which became connected through the movement’s engagement with kibbutz life and collective living. A history of the movement’s early years was documented in the 1999 publication Habonim in Britain 1928–1955.

=== Zionism ===
Habonim Dror is a Labor Zionist youth movement. Its educational programs often focus on Jewish and Zionist history and the role of collaborative work in fostering community and supporting tikkun olam ("repairing the world") to create a vibrant and sustainable society. The movement encourages members to consider immigrating to Israel.

Habonim Dror generally opposes Israeli settlement in the West Bank and the Israeli occupation of Palestinian territories, while supporting the establishment of a Palestinian state and efforts toward peace and normalization. The movement advocates for coexistence between Israelis and Palestinians, emphasizing collaboration and mutual trust to foster a peaceful future for all inhabitants of Israel, Palestine, and the surrounding region.

=== Socialism ===
Habonim Dror has historically emphasized the belief that socialist ideals can benefit both Jews and Arabs. Principles of equality and sharing are central to the movement. Members are generally treated equally, with a distinction maintained between chanichim (participants) and madrichim (leaders). Facilities are typically shared, reflecting the movement’s commitment to collaborative living.

This emphasis on unity and equality is also reflected in the mifkad (מפקד), a daily roll call held each morning except on Shabbat. During the mifkad, the day's schedule is announced and two songs are traditionally sung:

1. Od Lo Gamarnu (עוד לא גמרנו)
2. Hatikvah (התקווה)

Hatikvah
The national anthem of Israel

During the singing of these songs, the Habonim Dror flag and the flag of Israel are raised.

== Origins in the United Kingdom ==
According to the official history of Habonim Great Britain, "a certain mystique surrounded the question of who founded the Habonim Movement, but there is little doubt that the major personality behind the idea was Wellesley Aron". Aron acknowledged that he could not have succeeded without the assistance of Chaim Lipshitz, who organized the first model gedud (group), and Norman Lourie, whose enthusiasm helped attract additional volunteer leaders. Encouraged by these collaborators, Aron drafted the outline for the first handbook, and by April 1929, the organization was formally named Habonim. In May 1929, the first group, Gedud Trumpeldor, was launched under the leadership of Lipshitz. This date is generally recognized as the official founding date of Habonim.

Aron stated that he modeled Habonim on the principles of Scouting. The movement subsequently expanded to other English-speaking countries and British colonies where Jewish communities were present. In 1930, Norman Lourie founded Habonim Southern Africa in the Union of South Africa, with the first camp held in Parys in 1931. Initially, Habonim was conceived as a Jewish cultural movement for children aged 12 to 18, and was intended to be non-Zionist and non-political in orientation.

== Early history ==
Chaim Lipshitz was a natural choice to lead the first Habonim group, having already organized gatherings of boys at his father's cheder, which were well established by December 1928. This cheder was considered relatively progressive compared to many others of the time, which often focused exclusively on traditional Hebrew language instruction and the study of Torah and halakha.

In the newly formed group, Lipshitz taught Modern Hebrew, along with songs and dances of Jewish settlers in Palestine, Jewish history, and various games. He was assisted by Norman Lourie, a visitor from South Africa who had previously traveled to Palestine. The primary aim of these meetings was to engage and educate the children of Jewish immigrants from Poland and Russia—most of whom had arrived before 1905, when immigration to the United Kingdom became more restricted—about their Jewish heritage and the developments in the Jewish settlement in Palestine. Many of these children lived in challenging conditions in the East End of London, particularly in areas such as Stepney and Whitechapel, where limited educational opportunities were available.

=== Official founding ===
The first meeting of leaders from the Jewish youth community, as reported by Wellesley Aron, took place on 11 January 1929, according to a letter he wrote to Dr. S. Brodetsky of the Zionist Foundation. Aron noted that five individuals attended the initial gathering. Norman Lourie subsequently organized a larger meeting on 17 January 1929, which was attended by representatives from at least seven Jewish youth organizations. This meeting was held in London at 77 Great Russell Street, EC1. At the time, England was a center of political Zionism, particularly following the Balfour Declaration.

The newly established youth movement, named Habonim, was initially non-Zionist in its ideological orientation. The first gedud, Gedud Trumpeldor, was formed based on Lipshitz's existing youth group in Stepney, with Chaim Lipshitz serving as leader and Norman Lourie assisting.

In May 1929, a 27-page handbook outlining the functioning of Habonim was published, written by Aron with assistance from Lourie and his friend Nadia, whom Lourie later married. In 1930, Norman and Nadia Lourie returned to southern Africa, where they established Habonim branches in various towns across the continent as well as in India.

=== Habonim UK (1929–1955) ===
The movement expanded rapidly during its early years. By 1932, there were 21 groups operating in London alone. By the time of the ten-year "Jamboree Camp" in 1939, Habonim had at least 2,500 members. Initially, the various gedudim (groups) were organized as sex-segregated units, similar to the structure of the Scouting movement, but they soon became coeducational.

Associated with, but separate from, the movement were training farms known as hakhshara farms, where older members prepared for agricultural work and communal life on a kibbutz in anticipation of their future immigration to Palestine.

During the World War II, senior members of Habonim participated in organizing and caring for refugee children who escaped Nazi-occupied Europe through the Kindertransport program. These arrangements, often involving permanent separation from their parents, were facilitated by Jewish organizations still operating in Europe. Other members whose immigration to Palestine was postponed by the war contributed to the war effort by working as agricultural laborers to help address food shortages.

Graduates of British Habonim played a significant role in the founding of several kibbutzim in Palestine and the State of Israel, including Kfar Blum, Kfar Hanasi, Gesher Haziv, Beit HaEmek, Mevo Hama, Tuval and Amiad. Among these, Kfar Hanassi is noted as having the strongest British influence.

=== Graduates ===
Graduates of the two movements include:

- Howie B
- David Baddiel
- Ron Bloom
- Sacha Baron Cohen
- Jason Feddy
- Leonard Fein
- Stanley Fischer
- Jonathan Freedland
- Ira Glass
- J.J. Goldberg
- Chaim Herzog
- Tony Judt
- Mike Leigh
- Jack Markell
- Golda Meir
- Aaron Naparstek
- Michael Oren
- Dan Patterson and Mark Leveson (producers of Whose Line Is It Anyway?)
- Robert Popper
- David Rakoff
- Mark Regev
- Mordechai Richler
- Seth Rogen
- J. David Simons
- Toba Spitzer
- David Twersky
- Jaques Wagner
- Arnold Wesker

== Today ==
Today, Habonim Dror operates in seventeen countries worldwide. Its sister movement in Israel is HaNoar HaOved VeHaLomed.

Habonim Dror has adopted gender-inclusive practices in its programming. In addition to providing unisex bathrooms, the movement’s summer camps have adapted portions of the traditionally gendered Hebrew language to be more inclusive of transgender and non-binary participants. New terms have been introduced, including chanichol as a gender-neutral singular form for "camper" and chanichimot as a gender-neutral plural form, replacing the previously used gendered terms chanich, chanicha, and chanichim. Similarly, the terms for counselors have been updated: madrichol (singular gender-neutral) and madrichimot (plural gender-neutral) are now used instead of madrich, madricha, madrichim, or madrichot.

== Countries in which Habonim Dror operates ==
Habonim Dror operates in seventeen countries, including Aotearoa New Zealand, Argentina, Australia, Belgium, Brazil, Canada, France, Germany, Hungary, Mexico, the Netherlands, South Africa, the United Kingdom, the United States, and Uruguay.

=== New Zealand Aotearoa (HDAO) ===
Habonim Dror Aotearoa New Zealand (HDAO) has three centers: Auckland, the largest, as well as Christchurch and Wellington. Each ken runs weekly meetings, and the movement gathers for seminars throughout the year, in addition to winter and summer camps. Summer camps run for ten days and are held in tents on farms, maintaining a traditional camping style that includes digging their own latrines. Habonim Dror Aotearoa is one of the few Jewish youth movements worldwide to continue running summer camps entirely under canvas. Winter camps are shorter and held in cabins due to seasonal weather. HDAO celebrated its 70th anniversary in 2018 and is a member of the Australasian Zionist Youth Council (AZYC).

=== Australia (HDOZ) ===
Habonim Dror Australia (HDOZ) operates four kenim in Sydney, Melbourne, Perth, and an online branch, Ken Ha’Shemesh Ha’Olah, which connects to smaller communities across the country. The movement holds weekly meetings for students from Year 3 to Year 12 and organizes biannual camps. Each state runs independent winter camps and junior summer camps, while all states come together annually for a national federal camp (FEDCAMP) in January for students in Years 9–12.

Graduating members typically participate in Shnat Hachshara Ve'Hadracha Le'Aliyah ("year of preparation and guidance for aliyah"), a gap year program in the State of Israel focusing on experiential education and community involvement.

==== History ====
Habonim was introduced to Australia in 1940 by new immigrants who modeled it after similar European movements. The first meeting was held at Herzl Hall in Melbourne in March 1940, followed by the first summer camp in December. After a brief merger with Betar in 1942, Habonim re-established itself and expanded nationally in 1944. The first hachshara farm was established in Springvale, Victoria in 1945. The next year five Habonim graduates immigrated to Palestine and settled on Kibbutz Kfar Blum.

In 1957, a gar'in from Habonim Australia settled on Kibbutz Yizre'el. Several other gar'inim have attempted to settle in Israel since, including in cities like Haifa, Tiberias, and Tel Aviv.

==== Movement structure ====
At the federal level, HDOZ is coordinated by a mazkirut (executive secretariat) that includes a secretary-general (mazkir), treasurer (gizbar), head of education (rosh chinuch), community coordinator (rakaz kehilah), and a Shnat Coordinator (rakaz shnat). Each ken mirrors this structure locally. Each age group (shichvah) has a tzevet (team) of madrichim (leaders) responsible for planning activities and ensuring participant well-being. Tzvatim consist of senior leaders (bogrim) and junior leaders (madatzim), with educational programming for both campers and leaders.

Additional roles focus on areas such as Judaism, Zionism, environmental sustainability, equipment management, and political and social activism.

=== Belgium ===
The Belgian ken is one of the largest in Europe, gathering approximately 150 chaverim and madrichim weekly in Brussels. The leadership structure is refreshed annually, with elections for mazkirim (secretaries), va’adot (committees focusing on specific areas such as events or publication), and shlichim (adult representatives).

Habonim Dror Belgium organizes four annual machanot (camps): a five-day camp in October/November, a winter ski camp in December/January, a spring camp during Passover, and a longer summer camp in July, which until 2019 included collaboration with French kenim in Paris and Marseille.

=== Brazil ===
Habonim Dror was introduced to Brazil in 1945, first in Porto Alegre and São Paulo, later expanding to Curitiba, Rio de Janeiro, Recife, Salvador, Belo Horizonte, Manaus, and Fortaleza. The movement operates weekly programs for children and young adults aged 7 to 22, and hosts summer and winter machanot.

A Veidah Artzit (National Convention) is held every two years, where senior members can modify the movement’s national ideological platform, provided changes align with the principles of the World Movement.

=== Mexico ===
The Mexico City ken operates one of the most internationally connected branches of Habonim Dror, collaborating closely with North American and Latin American counterparts. Weekly gatherings bring together approximately chaverim and madrichim.

=== The Netherlands ===
Ichoed Haboniem-Dror beHolland
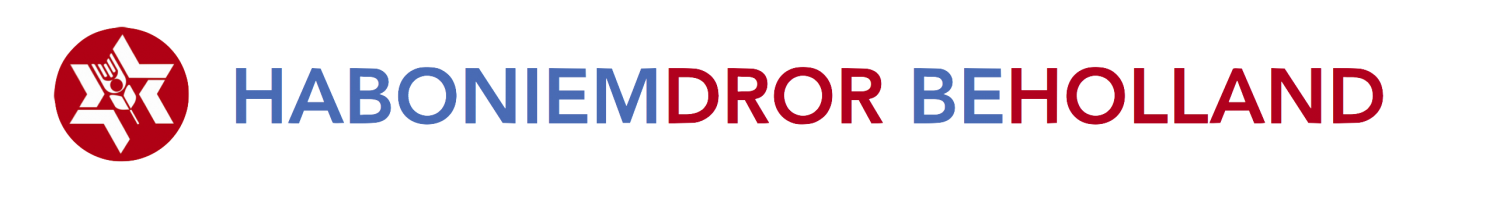

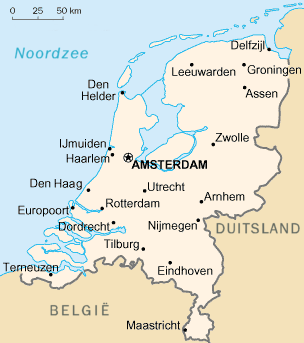
- Abbreviation: Habo
- Predecessor: Joodse Jeugdfederatie
- Merged into: Haboniem-Dror beHolland
- Formation: 1950
- Founded at: Amsterdam
- Merger of: Habonim
- Type: Socialist Zionist
- Legal status: Active
- Purpose: The building of a state for Jews in Israel
- Region served: Netherlands and Flanders
- Official language: Dutch, Hebrew, Flemish, English
- Board of directors: The mazkirut
- Website: http://www.haboniem.nl
- Formerly called: Joodse Jeugdfederatie

In the 1920s, the Joodse Jeugdfederatie (Jewish Youth Federation) was founded by Zionist Jewish youth in the Netherlands. The federation was open to all Jews in the Netherlands. It supported the establishment of a Jewish state in Palestine. During World War II, many members were killed during The Holocaust. After the war, survivors and former members came into contact with Habonim. The two movements collaborated, leading to the creation of Haboniem beHolland in 1950, with official international recognition following in 1951.

Originally, the movement’s purpose was to support the building of the State of Israel through aliyah. Over time, its focus shifted toward education about Israel, the Israeli–Palestinian conflict, and Jewish history. In 1958, Haboniem merged with the Kibbutz movement Meyuchad, which led to a union with Dror. Today, Haboniem-Dror in the Netherlands has approximately 300 members, with around 150 active contributors. While support for aliyah continues among some members, the primary emphasis is now on educational activities.

==== Activities ====
Haboniem-Dror organizes a variety of activities for its members, including five major camps and weekends (machanot), regional group activities (afdelingen), the General Members Assembly, "Habo Goes" events, and an educational trip known as the Israelreis.

Twice annually, a General Members Assembly is held, open to all members. During these assemblies, the movement’s progress and financial plans are presented. Members who are over 12 years old and current with their membership contributions are eligible to vote and submit motions. Elections for the new board take place at the summer assembly. Changes to the articles of association are also made when necessary; the most recent amendment occurred in 2014.

"Habo Goes" refers to activities organized outside of the movement’s clubhouse, excluding the machanot. These events typically involve outdoor activities, such as barbecues or sports days.

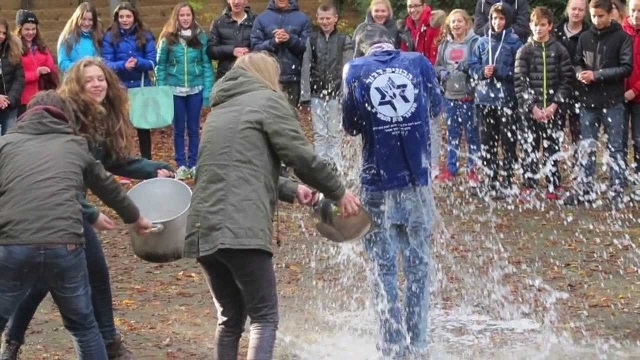
''The rosh (head of the camp) needs a wash'' tradition at the end of each of the machanot

==== Structure ====
Haboniem-Dror Netherlands utilizes a group-based membership structure. Members under the age of 17 (classified as JK7 or lower) are referred to as chanichiem (participants), while those aged 17 and older are known as madrichiem (leaders). The madrichiem are responsible for the leadership and organization of activities, the supervision of younger members, food preparation, entertainment, and logistics during camps and events.

The organizational structure includes six official groups of chanichiem, referred to as JKs. From JK6 onward, formal group naming ceases, as members transition into the madrichiem category, although an informal continuation of the numbering is sometimes maintained.

=== North America (HDNA) ===
Habonim in North America (HDNA) was established in April 1935 by Young Poale Zion, the youth arm of Poale Zion, at a convention held in Buffalo, New York. At its peak, the movement had over 2,000 campers participating in eleven summer camps across the United States and Canada. Today, HDNA organizes a variety of programs throughout the year, including a biannual veida (a general assembly with representatives from across the movement), local events in major cities, kibbutz programs in the State of Israel, a year-long educational and volunteer program in Israel known as Workshop, and additional ideology-focused gatherings. In 2013, the movement had a membership of over 1,700 youth.

HDNA operates six summer camps (machanot) across North America. These camps are a central part of the movement’s activities and are often more significant to members than local ken (branch) meetings, serving as key venues for community building and recruitment. The six camps are as follows:

- Camp Galil (Ottsville, Pennsylvania, USA)
- Camp Gesher (Cloyne, Ontario, Canada)
- Camp Gilboa (San Bernardino County, California, USA)
- Camp Miriam (Gabriola Island, British Columbia, Canada)
- Camp Moshava (Maryland) (Street, Maryland, USA)
- Camp Tavor (Three Rivers, Michigan, USA)

Several former HDNA camps and hachshara farms are no longer in operation. These include:

- Camp Amal (Vermont, 1948–1949, Na'aleh 1950, Cream Ridge 1951, Moshava 1952, and Galil 1953)
- Camp Bonim (Dallas, Texas)
- Camp Ein Harod (Ellenville, New York; originally located in Liberty, New York)
- Camp Kinneret (Chelsea, Michigan), which later merged with Camp Yad Ari to form Camp Tavor
- Camp Kvutzah Gimli (Gimli, Manitoba)
- Camp Kvutzah Montreal (St. Faustin, Quebec)
- Camp Tel Ari (Hunter, New York)
- Camp Tel Hai (New Buffalo, Michigan)
- Camp Tel Natan (Troy, Missouri)
- Camp Yad Ari (Waupaca, Wisconsin), later merged with Camp Kinneret to form Camp Tavor
- Cream Ridge Farm (Upper Freehold, New Jersey)
- Smithville Farm (Smithville, Ontario)
- Camp Na'aleh (Red Hook, New York; Elizaville, New York; Sidney, New York; Windsor, New York; and other locations)

Additionally, Machaneh Bonim in Israel (MBI) is a five-week summer program in the State of Israel for 16-year-olds (typically after tenth grade), during which participants from the six operating camps come together to engage in educational programming about Israel and Labor Zionism.

HDNA also publishes B'tnua, the movement magazine.

Habonim Dror North America collaborated with Ameinu, Hashomer Hatzair, and Meretz USA to form the Union of Progressive Zionists campus network, which later evolved into J Street U, with which Habonim Dror North America maintains an affiliation.

=== Southern Africa (HDSA) ===
When Norman Lourie initiated the founding of Habonim in South Africa in 1930, it was conceived as a Jewish equivalent to Baden-Powell’s Boy Scouts. Lourie had adopted the concept in London. The purpose of the movement was to promote a dual South African and Jewish identity. From the beginning, however, the focus of the Jewish identity was placed less on religious observance—though this was not neglected—and more on a connection to Zionism.

In a talk to the Women Zionists in November 1931, Lourie stated that the goal was “principally to stimulate Jewish boys and girls to a deeper understanding and appreciation of the heritage of the Jewish past, leading to a vision of the new Palestine as the spiritual pivot of our hopes.” Although immigration to Palestine was not explicitly mentioned, the movement’s stated aim was to stimulate Jewish youth “to a realization of their heritage as Jews and their responsibilities, in particular those relating to the upbuilding of Eretz Israel.” Habonim’s educational methodology was influenced by the Boy Scouts, with each unit (gedud) divided into patrols (kevutzot), and senior members (bonim), around the age of sixteen, serving as rashei kevutzot (patrol leaders). The movement emphasized scouting skills and a graded system of proficiency tests in both scouting and Jewish knowledge. Despite these influences, Habonim's name ("the builders") and ideological symbolism were firmly rooted in Jewish tradition and Zionist aspirations.

Habonim developed at a time when anti-Semitism was rising in South Africa, influenced by events in Nazi Europe. The 1930 South African Quota Act severely restricted Eastern European Jewish immigration, and by 1933, local Nazi groups such as the Greyshirts emerged. Against this backdrop, the new Habonim movement expanded rapidly. Beginning in 1931 with a gedud of twelve boys in Doornfontein, Johannesburg, led by Lourie himself, Habonim had grown by the end of 1933 to include 56 gedudim with approximately 1,100 members. Although autonomous initially, Habonim was later approached by the Zionist Youth Council, a department of the South African Zionist Federation, regarding affiliation.

==== Structure ====
Habonim Dror Southern Africa (HDSA) has two primary centers, located in Cape Town and Johannesburg, though it is active nationwide. The movement is managed by the Mazkirut (executive secretariat), which oversees national projects and collaborates with the Hanhaggah (national and regional leadership teams). Each regional center has a Va'ad Poel (executive committee) consisting of a rosh ken (head of the branch), two rosh bogrim (leaders of the graduate members), and two rosh chanichim (leaders of the younger members). National positions also include two rosh techni (IT and campsite management), two rosh shorashim (organizing cultural and educational trips to Israel), and two leaders responsible for social media activities.

The movement is structured by school year groups: Garinim (Grades 3–4), Shtilim (Grades 5–6), Bonim (Grade 7), Amelim (Grade 8), Sollelim (Grade 9), Sayarim (Grade 10), Shomrim (Grade 11), and Bogrim (Matric, university, and beyond).

==== Ideology ====
HDSA defines itself as a Jewish Zionist youth movement. It identifies as left-wing, but unlike some other branches of Habonim Dror, it does not explicitly describe itself as socialist. Instead, HDSA emphasizes support for economic and social equality.

The movement promotes a two-state solution and encourages members to contribute positively to Israeli society. It also stresses active citizenship within South Africa, encouraging members to work toward building a just and equitable post-apartheid society.

==== Hagshama (Fulfillment) ====
HDSA views hagshama as the personal process of fulfilling the movement’s ideals. It promotes a dual focus: chalutzic aliyah, or immigration to the State of Israel aimed at contributing to social change and maintaining Jewish identity within the state, and social activism within Southern Africa, focusing on socio-economic and political change in accordance with the movement's pillars of Zionism, Judaism, equality, and service to humanity.

HDSA views hagshama as an ongoing life process, and service to the movement itself is considered an important part of this fulfillment.

==== Activities ====
Despite the decline in the South African Jewish community due to white flight following the end of apartheid, HDSA remains active, holding weekly meetings for bogrim and shomrim members and organizing cultural events such as third seders and outreach programs.

HDSA hosts one of the largest summer camps in the Southern Hemisphere at its campsite in Onrus. Year-round activities are held for members aged 9 to 23. Many of these activities incorporate the movement’s ideological tenets, including Zionism, social activism, and community service.

The movement also organizes an annual educational tour to Israel for 16-year-olds and offers a ten-month post-secondary program that includes three months on a kibbutz, three months in an urban commune, and participation in the Machon leadership institute. The gap-year program also includes seminars, a Poland trip, and focused learning on the history of Habonim and hagshama, Israeli politics, and contemporary ideological challenges.

HDSA draws its membership from the Southern African region. However, the vast majority of its membership comes from South Africa.

=== United Kingdom (HDUK) ===
Habonim Dror United Kingdom (HDUK) operates six kenim (branches) across England and Scotland, located in London, Leeds, Glasgow, Manchester, Liverpool, and Nottingham. The movement runs meetings throughout the year and organizes a Machaneh (camp) and an Israel Tour during the summer.

HDUK offers five machanot (camps), one of which takes place at a residential site in Wales. Activities at this camp include hiking, educational programs, Shabbat celebrations, and other group activities. In addition, HDUK runs the Sayarim Machane in the Netherlands, which focuses on Holocaust education.

At the age of 16, members participate in the Israel Tour, a month-long trip during which they travel extensively throughout the State of Israel, learning about the country’s culture, history, and geography. The tour includes visits to significant sites, volunteer work, and a day spent alongside other Habonim Dror participants from around the world. Upon returning from the Israel Tour, participants transition into madrichim (leaders) and undergo a year-long hadracha (leadership training) program to prepare for leadership roles in future machanot.

Additionally, each year graduates who have finished their final year of secondary school may choose to participate in Shnat Hachshara ("Shnat"), a year-long experiential and educational program in the State of Israel that focuses on advancing the movement’s aims and engaging directly with Israeli society.
