= Shlomo Shafir =

Selimer Frenkel

Shlomo Shafir (Hebrew: שלמה שפיר; 1924–2013), known as Selimar Frenkel until 1948, was an Israeli journalist and historian. His work included the underground Hebrew-language publication Nitzotz, circulated in the Kovno Ghetto and Dachau concentration camp; the Israeli Labor Party newspaper, Davar; and other Hebrew, German, and English language writings.

During the Second World War, he was a prisoner in the Kovno Ghetto and was subsequently transferred first to Stutthof and then to Dachau concentration camp. After World War II he emigrated to Israel. In the 1960s he was stationed in Washington D.C. as the US correspondent for the newspaper Davar. In later years he served as the foreign affairs editor of Davar and the editor of the journal of the World Jewish Congress, Gesher.

== Early life and education ==
Shlomo Shafir was born in 1924 as Selimar Frenkel in Berlin, in the district of Schöneberg. His family's principal residence was in Eydtkuhnen, East Prussia (now Chernyshevskoye), where Frenkel grew up. He was educated by his father and his grandmother because his mother, Esther Frenkel, née Berkmann, was seriously ill with encephalitis. His father, Hermann Frenkel, was co-owner of a shipping company. Later, Selimar Frenkel moved to Kovno (Kaunas), then the capital of independent Lithuania. Beginning in 1936, he attended the Schwabe Gymnasium, a renowned Hebrew-language school, where he was a highly gifted student. The Hebrew language, which he had begun to learn at the age of seven, would become central to his conception of Zionism. Beginning in 1940, due to the Hitler–Stalin Pact and the Soviet re-occupation of Lithuania, Kovno was subject to Soviet law, which prohibited Hebrew-language education in the Jewish schools. As a result, Frenkel had to take his final examinations at a public school, in Yiddish, in June 1941.

== Zionist underground movement "Irgun Brit Zion" and Zionist underground newspaper " Nitzotz " (1944–1945) ==
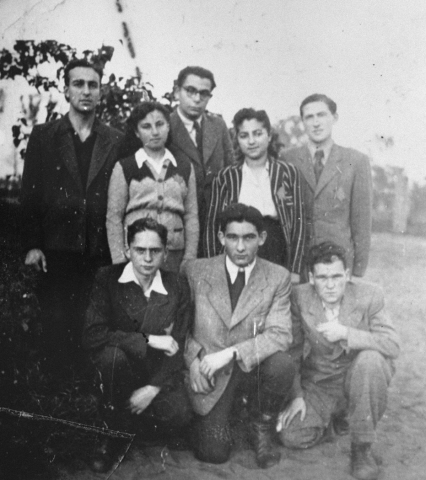
affiliation of members of the Irgun Brit Zion in the ghetto Kauen, 1943. Selimar Frenkel standing in the middle of the back

Frenkel was active in an underground movement, "Irgun Brit Zion" (IBZ), founded in 1940 under Soviet rule. IBZ was a Zionist youth organization. Most of its members favored a moderate socialist approach, but the organization also included religious followers of Bnei Akiva as well as several Revisionists, who were more right-wing. In June 1941, with the Nazi invasion of Lithuania, Kovno's Jews were confined to the Kovno Ghetto. Much of the ghetto's population was killed early on, and in June 1943, the remainder were subjected to reorganization of the ghetto as the Kaunas concentration camp. During this period, Frenkel was a member of the anti-Nazi resistance and helped to publish IBZ's underground newspaper, Nitzotz. The 42 issues of Nitzotz were written in Hebrew and circulated secretly to the members of IBZ and to the organization's sympathizers. Their articles discussed the future of the land of Israel and the political consequences of the crimes committed against the Jewish people; the authors demanded restitution, war crimes tribunals, and international support for a Jewish state. Frenkel would later resume publication of Nitzotz in Dachau-Kaufering concentration camp, making it the only known Hebrew-language journal to survive the concentration camps.

== From Kovno to Dachau Kaufering (1944–1945) ==
The main camp of the former Kovno Ghetto was liquidated in July 1944, following the Soviet re-occupation of Lithuania in June. Together with other surviving residents of the ghetto, Frenkel was transported through Stutthof to a Dachau satellite camp, Kaufering; another train brought prisoners to Auschwitz. In Kaufering, Frenkel assumed editorial responsibility for the continued publication of Nitzotz, under abject conditions. He later described these circumstances: "The living conditions in the huts and tents, which absorbed moisture in autumn and winter, were much harder than in the ghetto, and it is hard to imagine how it was possible to undertake any Zionist activity after a one-kilometer march and twelve hours of forced labor"

In November 1944, Frenkel was transferred from Kaufering II to Kaufering I, where he was reunited with his father and the living conditions were somewhat better. In Kaufering I, he devoted himself fully to the resistance at great personal danger. In addition to his work for Nitzotz he organized meetings with fellow Zionists from Kovno and organized memorials, lectures, and discussions in the Hebrew language These activities would have been punished immediately with death had they been discovered. The Dachau-Kaufering issues of Nitzotz were destroyed after circulation to avoid detection, but Frenkel managed to hide copies of five issues within the concentration camp. Before liberation, those issues were smuggled to safety, with the assistance of a Luxembourg priest who was interned in Dachau, Abbé Jules Jost, as well as a Spanish prisoner. Today, they are in Yad Vashem. An English translation was published in 2009 by Syracuse University Press.

== Liberation and the first years thereafter (1945–1948) ==
On April 29, 1945, Selimar Frenkel and his father were liberated from Dachau concentration camp. Hermann Frenkel survived only three weeks and was buried in the Woodland Cemetery in Dachau. After the war, Selimar Frenkel helped to found the "Histadrut Ha - Zionit Ha - Achida" (United Zionist Organization). In December 1946, he served as a delegate to the twenty-second World Zionist Congress. Nitzotz was published biweekly after the war and was the only Hebrew-language mouthpiece of the survivors (Hebrew :, She'erit Ha - Pletah'). It was subsequently published in the camp for Displaced Persons in Landsberg and later, until 1948, out of Munich. During this period, Frenkel served not only as editor of Nitzotz but also of the party newspaper of Poale Zion. In addition, he served as an Executive Member of the United Zionist Organization and later of Mapai in Germany .

In May 1947, Frenkel married Mina Kaminski. After liberation, Kaminski had returned for several months to Soviet Lithuania. There she rescued an almanac from the pre-war period, in which young members of IBZ (Ma'apilim), a group to which she had belonged, had collected memories and excerpts of Nitzotz . The almanac, which is now housed at Yad Vashem, is the only original document describing the early days of Nitzotz .

== Life in Israel (1948–2013) ==
In April 1948, shortly before the founding of Israel, Frenkel and Kaminski immigrated to Israel (aliyah). From this point on Selimar Frenkel adopted the Hebrew name Shlomo Shafir. He studied history at the Hebrew University of Jerusalem and graduated in 1961 with an MA.

After his military service Shafir worked for the newspaper Davar , one of the largest newspapers in Israel and the organ of the Israeli labor movement. From 1964 to 1968, he served as a correspondent for Davar to the United States. During this time he also pursued graduate studies at Georgetown University in Washington, D.C., and in 1971 he was awarded a PhD in history.

From 1974 to 2005 Shafir also served as editor-in-chief of the quarterly journal of the World Jewish Congress, Gesher. His historical publications explored the German–Israeli relationship, particularly between German social democracy (Social Democratic Party), the Jewish world, and Israel, as well as relations between the United States, Israel, and Germany since 1945. Shafir is the author of two monographs and a large number of scholarly articles in anthologies and journals in English, German and Hebrew (see bibliography). In 1982 he was awarded the Bundesverdienstkreuz for his contribution to the improvement of German-Israeli relations. Since 1996, he worked as a research associate of the Friedrich Ebert Foundation in Israel, where he wrote as an expert adviser on the political situation.

== Published works ==
- The Impact of the Jewish Crisis on American-German Relations: 1933–1939 Pt. 1&2, Ann Arbor, Mich. UMI 1971. (Zugl.: Washington, D.C., Georgetown Univ., Diss., 1971)
- American Diplomats in Berlin [1933–1939] and their Attitude to the Nazi Persecution of the Jews, in: Yad Vashem Studies on the European Jewish Catastrophe and Resistance 9 (1973), 71–104.
- George S. Messersmith: An Anti-Nazi Diplomat's View of the German-Jewish Crisis, in: Jewish Social Studies 35/1 (1973), 32–41.
- Taylor and McDonald: Two Diverging Views on Zionism and the Emerging Jewish State, in: Jewish Social Studies 39/4 (1977), 323–346.
- American Jewish Leaders and the Emerging Nazi Threat (1928–January 1933), in: American Jewish Archives 31/2 (Nov. 1979), 150–183.
- Asia wants peace between Israel and Egypt: A chat with Histadrut Secretary-General Y. Meshel on his return from the Asian Free Trade Unions Leaders Summit, Tel Aviv 1979. 6p.
- Nazi Guilt and Western Influence, in: Forum on the Jewish People, Zionism and Israel 36 (1979), 99–107.
- Roosevelt: His Attitude Towards American Jews, the Holocaust and Zionism, [S.l.]: World Zionist Organization, 1982.
- Roosevelt – his Attitude Towards American Jews, the Holocaust and Zionism, in: Forum on the Jewish People, Zionism and Israel 44 (1982), 37–52.
- Gesher: ktav-ʻet li-shʼelot ḥaye ha-ʼuma, ḥoref - ʼaviv [5]742, shana 28; hanhala ha-yisreʼelit shel ha-qongres ha-yehudi ha-ʻolami = The Israel Executive of the World Jewish Congress, Jerusalem, 1982.
- Julius Braunthal and his Postwar Mediation Efforts between German and Israeli Socialists, in: Jewish Social Studies, 1985, 47/3–4, 267–280.
- mit Bernard Avishai: 'The Tragedy of Zionism: Revolution and Democracy in the Land of Israel' (Book Review), in: Jewish Social Studies 48/2 (1986), Spring, 183–184.
- Yad Musheteth: יד מושטת : הסוציאלדמוקרטים הגרמנים ויחסם ליהודים ולישראל בשנים Yad musheṭet : ha-Sotsyaldemoḳraṭim ha-Germanim ṿe-yaḥasam la-Yehudim ule-Yiśraʼel ba-shanim 1945–1967 (hebr. Die ausgestreckte Hand. Die deutschen Sozialdemokraten und ihre Beziehungen zu den Juden und Israel, 1945–1967), Tel-Aviv 1986.
- Deutsche und Juden: Von der Pogromnacht bis zur Gegenwart, in: Gewerkschaftliche Monatshefte: Zeitschrift für soziale Theorie und Praxis 10 (1988), Jg. 39, 577–591. (PDF; 177 kB) ISSN 0016-9447
- Das Verhältnis Kurt Schumachers zu den Juden und zur Frage der Wiedergutmachung (engl.: The Attitude of Kurt Schumacher Towards the Jews and the Issue of Reparation), in: Willy Albrecht (Hrsg.): Kurt Schumacher als deutscher und europäischer Sozialist: Dokumentation einer internationalen Fachtagung im Kurt-Schumacher-Bildungszentrum der Friedrich-Ebert-Stiftung in Bad Münstereifel vom 6. bis 8. März 1987, Bonn: Abteilung Politische Bildung der Friedrich-Ebert-Stiftung 1988, 168–187. (=Materialien zur politischen Bildungsarbeit)
- Kurt Schumacher und die Juden, in: Die Tribüne: Zeitschrift zum Verständnis des Judentums 28/112 (1989), 128–138.
- Eine ausgestreckte Hand? Frühe amerikanisch-jüdische Kontakte zu deutschen Sozialdemokraten in der Nachkriegszeit, in: Internationale wissenschaftliche Korrespondenz zur Geschichte der deutschen Arbeiterbewegung (IWK), Juni, 1989, 25. Jg., Heft 2, 174–187.
- Die SPD und die Wiedergutmachung gegenüber Israel, in: Ludolf Herbst, Constantin Goschler (Hrsg.): Wiedergutmachung in der Bundesrepublik Deutschland, München 1989, 191–205, 428. (Schriftenreihe der Vierteljahrshefte für Zeitgeschichte. Sondernummer). ISBN 3486547216
- Raphael Patai: "Nahum Goldmann: His Mission to the Gentiles" (Book Review), in: American Jewish Archives, 1989/41, Heft 2, 233.
- The View of a Maverick Pacifist and Universalist: Rabbi Abraham Cronbach's Plea for Clemency for Nazi War Criminals in 1945, in: American Jewish Archives 42/2 (1990), 147–154.
- "Ha-‘nitzotz’ she-lo kaba" (The ‘Spark’, that was not Extinguished), in: Kesher, no. 9 (May 1991), 52–57. (hebr., mit englischen Abstracts)
- Henry Morgenthau and his Involvement in Rescue in Germany and Errata Israel [in Hebrew with English Summary, title translation], in: Yalkut Moreshet, No. 51, Tel-Aviv Nov. 1991, 35–49.[ On Henry Morgenthau jr.'s Activities in the 1940s and 1950s]
- Der jüdische Weltkongress und sein Verhältnis zu Nachkriegsdeutschland (1945–1967), in: Menora. Jahrbuch für deutsch-jüdische Geschichte 3 (1992), 210–237. ISSN 0939-5563, ZDB-ID 10223629
- American Jews and Germany After 1945: Points of Connection and Points of Departure, Cincinnati 1993. (=American Jewish Archives) ASIN: B001TKIQXS
- Die amerikanischen Juden und Deutschland – ein ambilavalentes Verhältnis, in: Recht und Wahrheit bringen Frieden (1994), 251–266.
- Postwar German Diplomats and Their Efforts to Neutralize American Jewish Hostility: The First Decade, in: YIVO Annual 22/1 (1995), 155–201.
- Bilanz eines großen Juden. Nahum Goldmann zum 100. Geburtstag, in: Tribüne. Zeitschrift zum Verständnis des Judentums 34/134 (1995), 62–70.
- mit Simona Kedmi (ed.).: At the Crossroads: World Jewry Faces its Future, Institute of the World Jewish Congress, Jerusalem 1996.
- The American Jewish Community's Attitude To Germany: The Impact of Israel, in: The Journal of Israeli History. Politics, Society, Culture 18/2–3 (1997), 237–255. ISSN 1353-1042
- American Jewish Leaders and the Emerging Nazi threat (1928–January 1933), in: Jeffrey S. Gurock (ed.), America, American Jews, and the Holocaust, (=American Jewish History 7) Routledge, New York, 1998, 99–134.
- Ambiguous Relations: The American Jewish Community and Germany Since 1945, Jacob Rader Marcus Center of the American Jewish Archives. Wayne State University Press, Detroit, Mich. 1999. ISBN 0-8143-2723-0
- Die Stimmung wird besser: Amerikas Juden und Deutschland, in: Tribüne. Zeitschrift zum Verständnis des Judentums, 38/151 (1999), 122–132. ISSN 0041-2716
- Die Rolle der amerikanisch-jüdischen Organisationen im trilateralen Verhältnis, in: Helmut Hubel (Hrsg.): Die trilateralen Beziehungen zwischen Deutschland, Israel und den USA, Erfurt 2001, 53–76. (Landeszentrale für politische Bildung Thüringen) ISBN 3-931426-47-5
- mit Simona Kedmi: The Jewish People at the Threshold of the New Millennium. World Jewish Congress. [Gehser-Symposium] Plenary Assembly.; Jerusalem Institute of the World Jewish Congress, 2001.
- Von der Abgrenzung zum vorsichtigen Dialog: das amerikanische Judentum und Nachkriegsdeutschland, in: Detlef Junker, Philipp Gassert, Wilfried Mausbach, David B. Morris (Hrsg.): Die USA und Deutschland im Zeitalter des Kalten Krieges 1945–1990: ein Handbuch: Band 1: 1945–1968, Stuttgart; München 2001, 1: 833–847.
- Constantly Disturbing the German Conscience: the Impact of American Jewry, in: Dan Michman (ed.): Remembering the Holocaust in Germany, 1945–2000; German Strategies and Jewish Responses. Peter Lang, New York, 2002, 121–141.
- From Negation to First Dialogues: American Jewry and Germany in the First Postwar Decades, in: Detlef Junker, Philipp Gassert, Wilfried Mausbach (Hrsg.): The United States and Germany in the Era of the Cold War, 1945–1990: A Handbook.Volume 1: 1945–1968, Cambridge University Press, New York: 2004, 550–558.
- The Twisted Road Toward Rapprochement: American Jewry and Germany Until Reunification, in: Detlef Junker, Philipp Gassert, Wilfried Mausbach (Hrsg.): The United States and Germany in the Era of the Cold War, 1945–1990: A Handbook.Volume 2: 1968–1990, Cambridge University Press, New York, 2004, 474–482.
- The Rise and Fall of the Social Democratic Press in Europe. Reprint from Kesher, no. 35, Winter 2007. (in Hebrew)
- Helmut Schmidt: seine Beziehung zu Israel und den Juden, in: Wolfgang Benz (Hrsg.): Jahrbuch für Antisemitismusforschung 17, Metropol Verlag, Berlin 2008, 297–321. Das Digitalisat ist seit Februar 2009 über das Portal 'compass-infodienst.de' zugänglich.
- Nahum Goldmann and Germany After World War II, in: Mark A. Raider: Nahum Goldmann: Statesman without a State, Suny Press, Albany; Chaim Rosenberg School of Jewish Studies, the Chaim Weizmann Institute for the Study of Zionism and Israel, Tel Aviv University, Tel Aviv 2009, 207–231.
- Willy Brandt, die Juden und Israel, in: Jahrbuch für Antisemitismusforschung 19 (2010), 379–404. ISBN 978-3940938923
- The Quandt Family: Wealth, Responsibility, and Silence, in: Yad Vashem Studies 40/2 (2012), 195–215.

== Secondary literature (selection) ==
- Inge Günther (Jerusalem): Angela Merkel trifft in der Knesset den passenden Ton - Mancher Israeli genießt die Nähe zur Kanzlerin, in: Stuttgarter Zeitung, 19. März 2008, 3.
- Inge Günther (Jerusalem): "Die Shoah erfüllt uns mit Scham", in: Kölner Stadt-Anzeiger, 19. März 2008, ?
- Inge Günther (Jerusalem): Der richtige Ton - Angela Merkel meistert ihren schwierigen Auftritt vor dem israelischen Parlament gut und betont die besonderen Beziehungen zwischen Deutschen und Israelis, in: Badische Zeitung, 19. März 2008, 3.
- Marc-Christoph Wagner (Berlin): Vom Feind zum Alliierten / Die deutsch-amerikanischen Beziehungen im Kalten Krieg, in: Neue Zürcher Zeitung, 24. Juli 2001, 7 (Ausland)
- Oliver Schmolke (Berlin): Verschlungene Wege eines schwierigen Dialogs. Shlomo Shafir über deutsch-jüdisch-amerikanische Beziehungen (Besprechung von Shlomo Shafirs Buch "Ambiguous Relations", 1999), in: Der Tagesspiegel, 17072, 5. Juni 2000, 9 (Politische Literatur)
- Gisela Dachs (Hamburg): Kritik in Kürze (Besprechung von Shlomo Shafirs Buch "Ambiguous Relations", 1999), in: Die Zeit, 43, 21. Oktober 1999, ? (Literaturbeilage)
- Michael Wolffsohn (München): Deutsche, Juden und Amerika (Besprechung von Shlomo Shafirs Buch "Ambiguous Relations", 1999), in: Die Welt, 18. September 1999, 8 (Politisches Buch)
- Inge Günther (Jerusalem): 50 Jahre UN-Beschluss zur Teilung Palästinas, in: Frankfurter Rundschau, 29. November 1997, 3.
