= Nostra aetate =

1965 Catholic Church document on relations with non-Christian religions

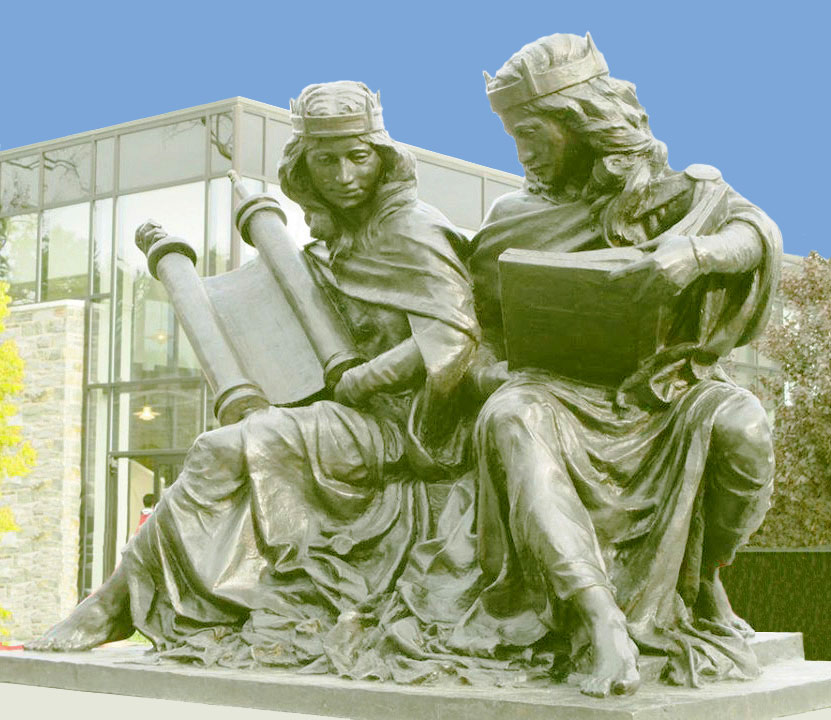
Synagoga and Ecclesia in Our Time (2015), sculpture by Joshua Koffman at the Jesuit-run Saint Joseph's University, Philadelphia, commemorating Nostra aetate

Nostra aetate (from Latin: "In our time"), or the Declaration on the Relation of the Church with Non-Christian Religions, is an official declaration of the Second Vatican Council, an ecumenical council of the Catholic Church. It was promulgated on 28 October 1965 by Pope Paul VI. Its name comes from its incipit, the first few words of the opening sentence of the Latin version, as is tradition. It passed the Council by a vote of 2,221 to 88 of the assembled bishops.

The shortest of the 16 final documents of the Council, it is "the first in Catholic history to focus on the relationship that Catholics have with Jews." Similarly, Nostra aetate is considered a monumental declaration in describing the Church's relationship with Muslims. It "reveres the work of God in all the major faith traditions." It begins by stating its purpose of reflecting on what humankind has in common in these times when people are being drawn closer together. The preparation of the document was largely under the direction of Cardinal Augustin Bea as President of the Secretariat for Promoting Christian Unity, along with his periti (advisors), such as John M. Oesterreicher, Gregory Baum and Bruno Hussar.

Following an approach by Jules Isaac, a French-born Jew who was associated with the Seelisberg Conference of the International Council of Christians and Jews, in which he claimed that Christian antisemitism had prepared the way for the Holocaust, a sympathetic Pope John XXIII endorsed the creation of a document which would address a new, less adversarial approach to the relationship between the Catholic Church and Rabbinic Judaism. Within the Church, some conservative Cardinals were suspicious and some Middle Eastern Catholics strongly opposed the creation of such a document. After going through numerous drafts, compromises were made and a statement was added on Islam to mollify the security concerns of the Arab Christians. Finally, statements on Eastern religions, Buddhism and Hinduism were also added.

== Summary ==
The document begins by stating:

In our time, when day by day mankind is being drawn closer together, and the ties between different peoples are becoming stronger, the Church examines more closely her relationship to non-Christian religions. In her task of promoting unity and love among men, indeed among nations, she considers above all in this declaration what men have in common and what draws them to fellowship.

The key observation about other faiths reads: "The Catholic Church rejects nothing that is true and holy in these religions. She regards with sincere reverence those ways of conduct and of life, those precepts and teachings, which though different in many aspects from the ones she holds and sets forth, nonetheless often reflect a ray of truth which enlightens all men."

Religious freedom became a new part of Catholic teaching with Vatican II and this declaration. Nostra aetate declared that there are positive elements in other religions and religious stereotypes and prejudices can be overcome through interreligious dialogue. Pope Francis said, "From indifference and opposition, we've turned to cooperation and goodwill. From enemies and strangers, we've become friends and brothers."

The final paragraph calls on Catholics to enter into "dialogue and collaboration" with those of other faiths.

It describes the eternal questions which have dogged men since the beginning, and how the various religious traditions have tried to answer them.

It mentions some of the answers that some Hindus, Buddhists, and members of other faiths have suggested for such philosophical questions. It notes the willingness of the Catholic Church to accept some truths present in other religions in so much as they reflect Catholic teaching and may lead souls to Christ.

Part three goes on to say that the Catholic Church regards the Muslims with esteem, and then continues by describing some of the things Islam has in common with Christianity: worship of One God, the Creator of Heaven and Earth, Merciful and Omnipotent, Who has spoken to men; the Muslims' respect for Abraham and Mary, and the great respect they have for Jesus, whom they consider to be a Prophet and not God. The synod urged all Catholics and Muslims to forget the hostilities and differences of the past and to work together for mutual understanding and benefit. Some of these themes are repeated in chapter two of Lumen gentium.

Part four of the text deals with Jews. Repeated in the text is the traditional teaching that the Catholic Church sees the beginnings of its Faith in the Patriarchs and Prophets of ancient Israel. It also notes that the Apostles and many of the early Disciples of Jesus Christ at the founding of the Catholic Church had their roots in the Jews of that time, despite the fact that "Jerusalem did not recognize the time of her visitation, nor did the Jews in large number, accept the Gospel; indeed not a few opposed its spreading." The most significant departure in the document from previous approaches was that "this sacred synod wants to foster and recommend that mutual understanding and respect which is the fruit, above all, of biblical and theological studies as well as of fraternal dialogues." This paved the way for Catholic–Jewish interfaith dialogue in the decades following on from the Second Vatican Council in a manner which was not commonplace before.

The final text of Nostra aetate, as promulgated in 1965, in regard to the question of Jewish deicide (that is to say Jewish culpability for the trial and crucifixion of Jesus Christ) did not include the word "deicide" specifically, as it had in some previously proposed versions. On this issue, the document says "what happened in His passion cannot be charged against all the Jews, without distinction, then alive, nor against the Jews of today." The exclusion of the specific term "deicide" and the textual ambiguity resulting from the fierce debates at the council is such that the text has been interpreted in different ways, the "cannot be charged against all the Jews, without distinction" allows conservatives to present that the Jews who had become Christians, then and since, were not culpable, while others present it as exonerating the Jews of deicide as a whole. At the time of its promulgation, liberal elements within the SECU and American Jewish organisations saw the final version of the text as a defeat for their position on this issue.

On the question of antisemitism, the document says that the Church "decries hatred, persecutions, displays of anti-Semitism, directed against Jews at any time and by anyone." Earlier versions of the text said that it "condemns" it, but this was removed from the final version.

The fifth part states that all men are created in God's image, and that the "Church reproves, as foreign to the mind of Christ, any discrimination against men or harassment of them because of their race, color, condition of life, or religion."

== History of the document ==
Before his death in 1963, Pope John XXIII wrote a statement which he intended to be read aloud in all Roman Catholic Churches of the world on a fixed date:

We are conscious today that many many centuries of blindness have cloaked our eyes so that we can no longer either see the beauty of Thy Chosen People nor recognize in their faces the features of our privileged brethren. We realize that the mark of Cain stands upon our foreheads. Across the centuries our brother Abel has lain in the blood which we drew or shed the tears we caused by forgetting Thy Love. Forgive us for the curse we falsely attached to their name as Jews. Forgive us for crucifying Thee a second time in their flesh. For we knew not what we did.

Originally, Nostra aetate was only supposed to focus on the relationship between the Catholic church and Judaism. There were five different drafts of the document before a final version was accepted. Some bishops and cardinals objected, including Middle Eastern bishops who were unsympathetic to the new state of Israel. Cardinal Bea decided to create a less contentious document which would stress ecumenism between the Catholic Church and all non-Christian faiths. While coverage of Hinduism and Buddhism is brief, two of the document's five sections are devoted to Islam and Judaism.

Title	Date	Author
Decree on the Jews (Decretum de Iudaeis)	1 November 1961	Written by Secretariat for Christian Unity
On the Attitude of Catholics Toward Non-Christians and Especially Toward Jews	8 November 1963	Written by Secretariat for Christian Unity
Appendix 'On the Jews' to the "Declaration on Ecumenism"	1 March 1964	Written by Secretariat for Christian Unity
On the Jews and Non-Christians	1 September 1964	Written by Second Vatican Council Coordinating Commission
Declaration on the Church's Relationship to Non-Christian Religions	18 November 1964	Written by Secretariat for Christian Unity
Amendments to Section 4	1 March 1965	Written by Secretariat for Christian Unity

=== Before the Council: Decretum de Iudaeis, 1960–1962 ===
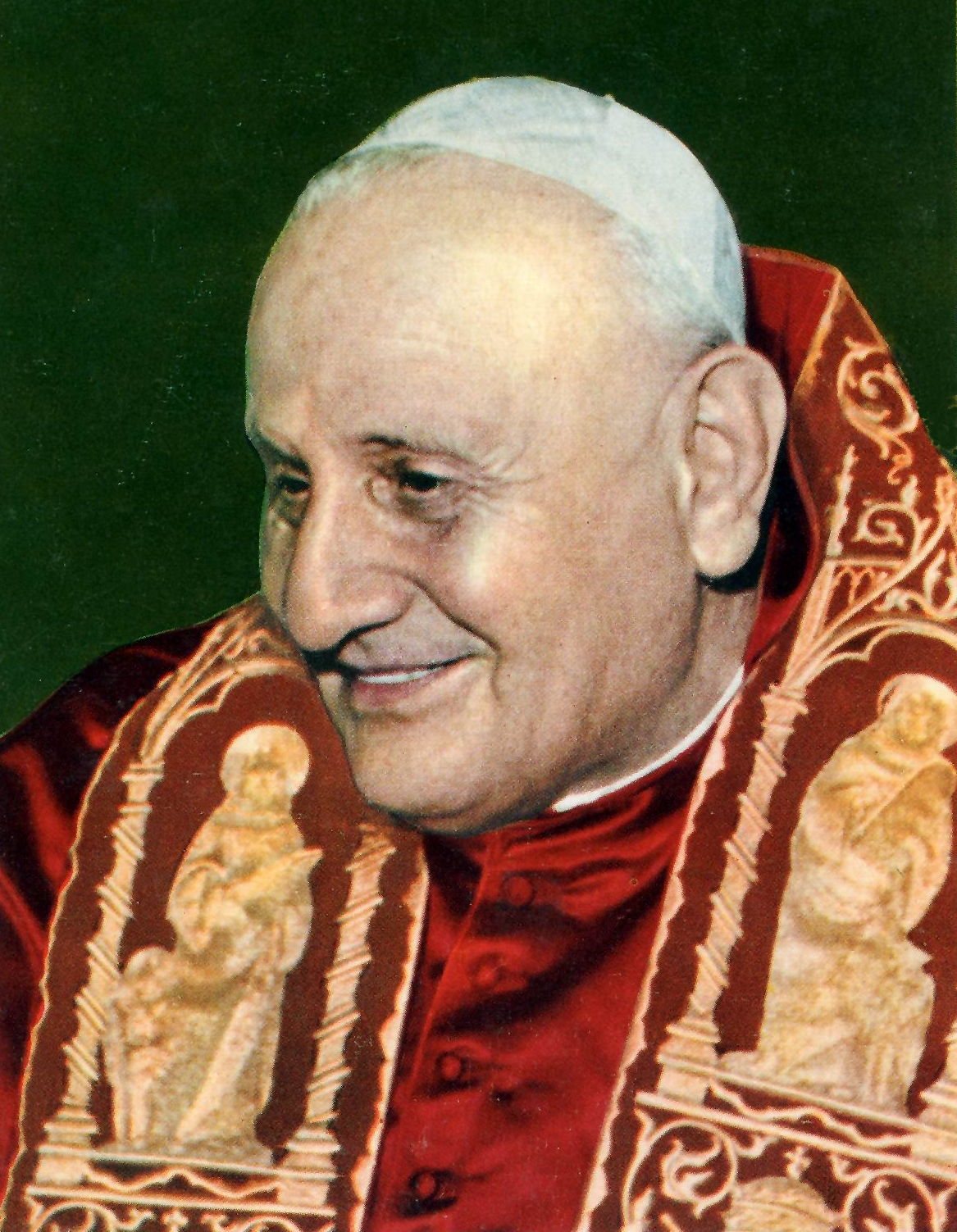
John XXIII met with Jules Isaac in 1960, the author of Jésus et Israël. After the meeting, he directed the SECU to prepare a document on Catholic–Jewish relations for the Second Vatican Council.

The specific origins of Nostra aetate can be traced directly to a meeting between Pope John XXIII and Jewish-French historian Jules Isaac on 13 June 1960. Isaac wanted a document at the Second Vatican Council, in light of the Holocaust, to specifically address the relationship between the Catholic Church and Judaism. In his meeting with John XXIII, Isaac used diplomatic language, pointing to the Fourth Chapter of the Catechism of the Council of Trent, in which Jews are mentioned in combination with the Romans as "advisors and perpetrators of the passion" and that the Catechism lays ultimate responsibility for the death of Jesus Christ, not just upon the Jews, but upon humanity's original sin and the "vices and crimes which people have committed from the beginning of the world to the present day and will go on committing until the end of time." Thus, Isaac, argued, even within the context of Catholic doctrine, it would be possible for the Holy See to make a statement distancing the Church from preaching the concept of Jewish deicide (to which Isaac attributed a significant bulk of what he called "Christian anti-semitism"). John XXIII, more so than his predecessors, was favourably disposed to such a suggestion; previously as the Archbishop Apostolic Delegate to Turkey, he had had a long relationship with Jewish communities and since being raised to the Papacy in 1958, had ushered in a period of "openness to the world" (what was called giovanissimo). John XXIII had already removed from the Good Friday prayer for the Jews the term "perfidious" (meaning faithless) in 1959.

Isaac, a French-born Jew, had a long history of activism in regard to Jewish ethno-religious concerns, tracing back to the Dreyfus affair when he was a teenager. Leading up to the Second World War, he had been part of the left-wing group CVIA and after the war he had founded, along with Jacob Kaplan, Edmond Fleg and other French-born Jews, the Amitié Judéo-chrétienne de France on 26 February 1948. This was following on from the Seelisberg Conference of the International Council of Christians and Jews (originally an American-British initiative) a year earlier at which Isaac had been a key speaker. Through several works, Jesus and Israel (1946), the Genesis of Anti-Semitism (1948) and The Teaching of Contempt (1962)—the latter published at the start of Vatican II—Isaac had laid out his central thesis that, the "most dangerous form of anti-semitism is Christian anti-semitism", which he treats not as a peripheral anomaly, but inherent in its origins, from the Passion as described by the Four Evangelists in the Gospels, through the Church Fathers to the present day. Isaac's solution to this was that Christianity must "amend" its beliefs, expunge from its doctrines any "teachings of contempt" which present Rabbinic Judaism as rejected or inferior and adopt a new relationship with Jews.

John XXIII had created the Secretariat for Promoting Christian Unity (SECU), a few days before his meeting with Isaac on 5 June 1960. This organisation was to be headed up by Cardinal Augustin Bea, a veteran German Jesuit cleric, with Bishop Johannes Willebrands, a Dutch clergyman, appointed as his Secretary. The body was developed to address the relationship between the Catholic Church and other separate groups who identified as Christians. Many of the periti appointed to the Secretariat had been part of the ecumenical movement and thus tended to be supportive of a broad and liberal interpretation of its objectives. With the first plenary meeting of the SECU in November 1960, a second official mandate was put under their aegis: a view on Catholic–Jewish relations. Bea sought outside opinion from Jewish leaders for Dei Judaeis and was advised to approach Nahum Goldmann, president of the World Jewish Congress. The two men met in Autumn 1960: Goldmann explained to Bea that while the WJC were open to the idea, many proponents of Orthodox Judaism would be resistant to any collaboration. Some of the Orthodox Rabbis, while opposed to Christianity for theological reasons anyway, also feared that they too may be pressured into changing exclusivistic doctrines essential to their own religion, such as their claim to being the "chosen people" and thus preferred not to get involved. Similarly, within the Catholic Church itself, conservative elements in the Curia and the Doctrinal Commission (with figures such as Cardinal Alfredo Ottaviani and Fr. Sebastian Tromp) were opposed to the works of the SECU, due to what they viewed as the threat to Catholic doctrine by religious indifferentism.

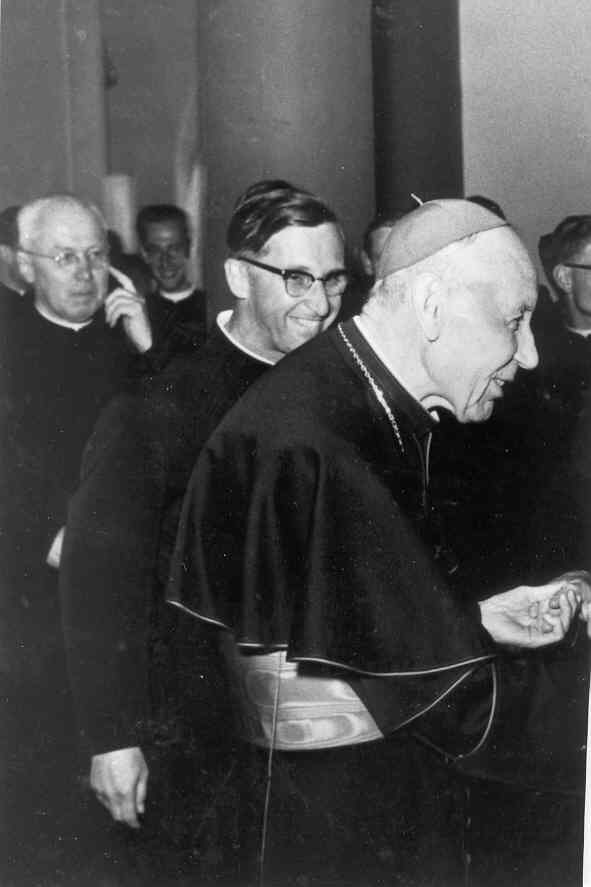
Cardinal Augustin Bea oversaw the drafting of Nostra aetate by his periti as the President of the Secretariat for Promoting Christian Unity.

Egypt, then under the leadership of Gamal Abdel Nasser, particularly concerned itself with all Vatican documents on the Jews which were published since the time of Isaac's visit to John XXIII back in 1960. The Voice of the Arabs, based in Cairo, ascribed this move to a "Zionist plot to capitalize on the Vatican Council in order to further the oppression of the Palestinian refugees." The Lebanese Embassy and the Egyptian Embassy in Rome made their complaints known to the Vatican. In spite of this, John XXIII allowed the SECU under Bea to continue its work on a document on Jewish-Catholic relations. Bea openly met with Ralph Friedman and Zacariah Shuster of the American Jewish Committee at Rome in 1961, inviting them to submit a memorandum on anti-Jewish elements in Catholic textbooks and liturgy. The AJC responded to the SECU with two documents: "The Image of the Jew in Catholic Teaching" by Judith Banki and then "Anti-Jewish Elements in Catholic Liturgy", outlining the changes to Church teachings and practices that they wanted the planned Council to implement. As part of this, Bea also agreed to meet with Abraham Joshua Heschel of the Jewish Theological Seminary of America and Max Horkheimer of the Frankfurt School in November 1961 to discuss new Church approaches to the Jews.

With the Curial conservatives—largely from Italy and Spain—and the Arab Christians now on the backfoot, a different approach was presented; the security of Christians in the Middle East. It was put to John XXIII that nothing must be done that would compromise the position of the Catholic Church in the Middle East and that the Church has a pastoral responsibility to ensure above all that Christians in the Middle East could practice their faith unmolested (any kind of outreach to Jews likely being seen as a precursor to Holy See recognition of the State of Israel). Instead of a document just dealing with Judaism, a general statement on non-Christian religions should be prepared and in any case any Council should be delayed until at least 1965, they argued. Instead of agreeing to their demands, John XXIII doubled down on his project. He stated that a Council would be called in the following year and addressing Jewish-Catholic relations would be put to the Central Preparatory Commission. Commentary Magazine, also claimed in an article published in 1965, that John XXIII intended to set up a permanent Secretariat for Jewish Relations after the council, the SECU itself would be permanent and that non-Christian advisers would be permitted to attend the council and be able to submit documents to it, despite not being members of the Catholic Church.

Working underneath Bea were four clerics; John M. Oesterreicher, Gregory Baum, Leo Rudloff and Georges Tavard. The German, Karl Thieme, who was not involved in the drafting, was a major influence on the intellectual reorientation of Oesterreicher due to the debates the two had. After meeting several times at Seton Hall University in New Jersey, the group drafted for Bea a study document "Questions Concerning the Jews" (Questiones de Iudaeis), which was drafted properly as the "Decree on the Jews" (Decretum de Iudaeis), with Oesterreicher's pen being most prominent. The document was completed in November 1961. In a meeting in New Delhi in December 1961, the World Council of Churches issued an explicit proclamation in which they stated "the historic events which led to the Crucifixion should not be so presented as to fasten upon the Jewish people of today responsibilities which belong to our corporate humanity." The polemics intensified, as Egyptian media outlets such as Al Gomhuria argued that Bea's ancestral name was "Behar" and that he was of Jewish ancestry. The Jewish ancestry of Oesterreicher and Baum was also highlighted as proof of a supposed "Zionist plot".

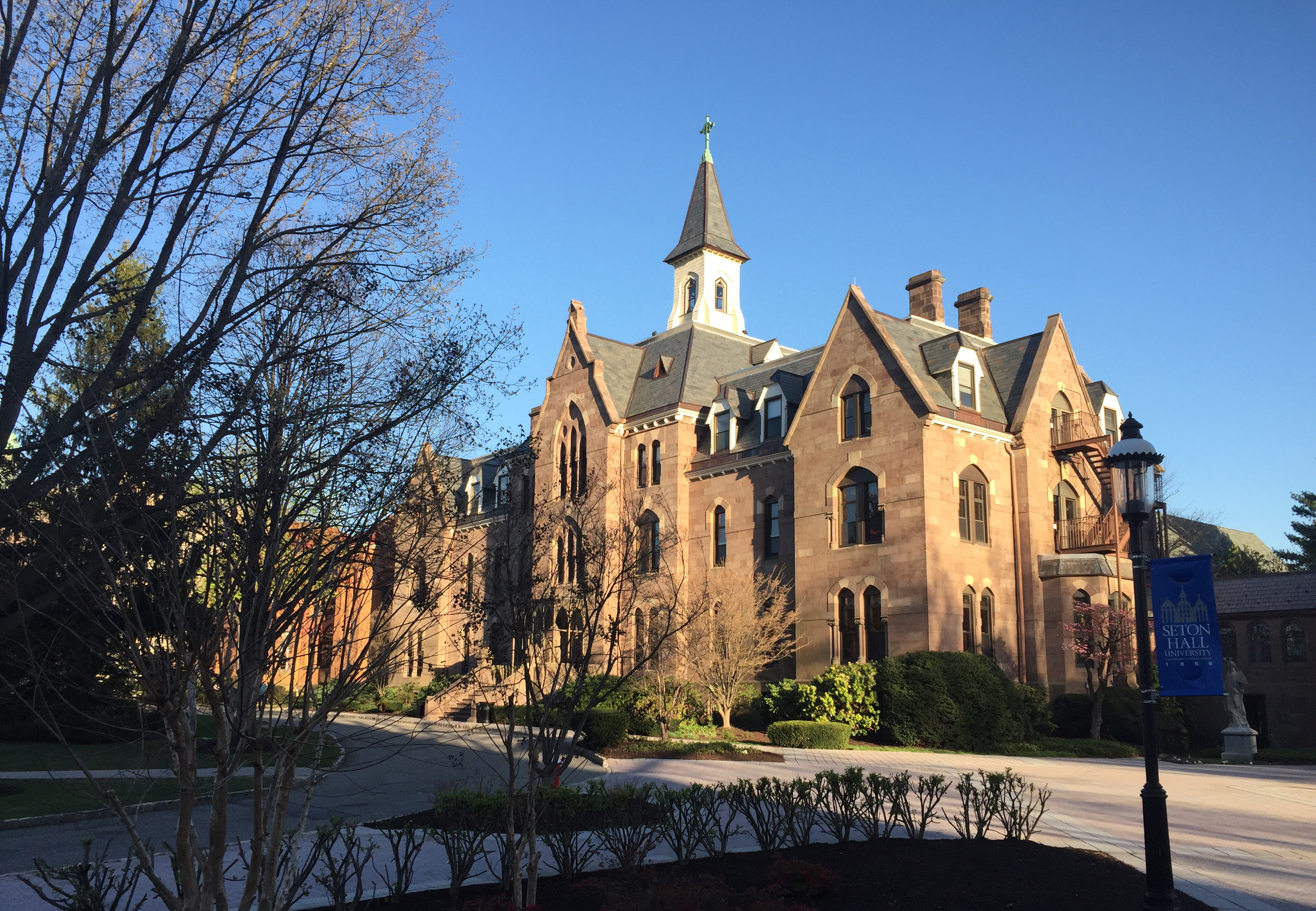
Seton Hall University, New Jersey in the United States, where Decretum de Iudaeis was drafted in 1961. Jewish convert and Vatican II peritus, John M. Oesterreicher, founded the Institute of Judaeo-Christian Studies here in 1953.

The initial drafting of Decretum de Iudaeis by the SECU was completed in November 1961. The actual text of the document was four paragraphs long. Much of the first paragraph was uncontroversial to all factions, as it highlighted the continuity of the Catholic Church with the Patriarchs and Prophets of Israel before the coming of Jesus Christ and the nature of the Church as the spiritual continuation of ancient Israel's covenant with the god of Abraham (the only criticism conservative elements had of this was the relevance of Old Covenant Judaism to a document on relations with modern Talmud-centered Rabbinic Judaism). Much of the controversy over the actual text of Decretum de Iudaeis, was based on interpretations of Romans 11, which was used as justification for the line "it would be an injustice to call this people accursed, since they are greatly beloved for the sake of the Fathers and the promises made to them." The text, also referencing Romans 11, broached eschatological themes in regard to the eventual union of Jews with the Church. This new interpretation of Romans 11 had been developed by Karl Thieme (a longtime correspondent of John M. Oesterreicher, one of the main SECU periti and drafters under Bea), a pioneer in Catholic-Jewish interfaith dialogue since the late 1930s and a contributor to Gertrud Luckner's Freiburger Rundbrief. According to John Connelly, author of From Enemy to Brother (2012), for the draft Oesterreicher directly borrowed from Thieme's vision for Romans 11, which he had formulated for an ecumenical congress in Evanston in 1954 (Thieme had in turn being influenced by Karl Barth and Barth had allegedly drawn it from Moses Maimonides). In addition to this, a final, uncited paragraph in this version of the draft claimed that "Whoever despises or persecutes this people does injury to the Catholic Church."

In June 1962, the World Jewish Congress, acting on its own initiative, appointed Dr. Chaim Wardi, an Israeli counsellor in the Israeli Ministry of Religious Affairs, as an "unofficial Jewish observer" at the council. The Israeli Foreign Ministry under Golda Meir publicly endorsed this. The issue became known as the "Wardi affair" and caused a political crisis for the Vatican under John XXIII, who had maintained that the document had no political implications and was about encouraging amicable religious relations. Within five days of Wardi's "appointment", Cardinal Amleto Giovanni Cicognani as Secretary of the Central Preparatory Commission removed the Decretum de Iudaeis schema from the agenda (as Cardinal Secretary of State, he was particularly sensitive to diplomatic issues), never to be presented in this form to the council as a whole. While the Jewish schema was off the agenda for the First Session of Vatican II, the issue was not put to rest, as liberals, starting with the actions of Cardinal Achille Liénart made a strong early showing to direct the general course of the council. The possibility of a Jewish document still loomed large for its opponents.

=== Second Session of the Council, 1962–1963 ===
Since his initial meetings with Bea in 1962, with many other meetings following, including significantly a meeting at the AJC's headquarters in New York on 31 March 1963; Rabbi Abraham Joshua Heschel became the primary figure articulating the religious Jewish viewpoint to the Vatican on behalf of the American Jewish Committee during the Second Vatican Council. He had been brought into contact with Bea, through his student, the AJC's Rabbi Marc Tanenbaum. Associated with Conservative Judaism, was involve the American civil rights movement and protested against the Vietnam War. His memorandum on behalf of the American Jewish Committee, entitled "On Improving Catholic–Jewish Relations", had a significant influence on proceedings of Bea's Secretariat. The meeting in New York had also been attended by Bea's Secretary Msgr. Johannes Willebrands and Fr. Felix Morlion, president of Rome's Pro Deo University. The evening following the AJC meeting, a lavish dinner was put on in honour of Bea at New York's Plaza Hotel. It included over 400 Jewish, Protestant and Catholic leaders. As well as Herschel and Bea, other major figures present included U Thant, the Secretary General of the United Nations and Muhammad Zafarullah Khan, President of the UN General Assembly, American Cardinals Richard Cushing and Francis Spellman and also Nelson Rockefeller as Governor of New York, amongst many others. According to Lazare Landau, writing in the Tribune Juive, similar, but more discreet meetings took place in France between Fr. Yves Congar and the Jewish community at the Centre communautaire de le Paix in Strasbourg.

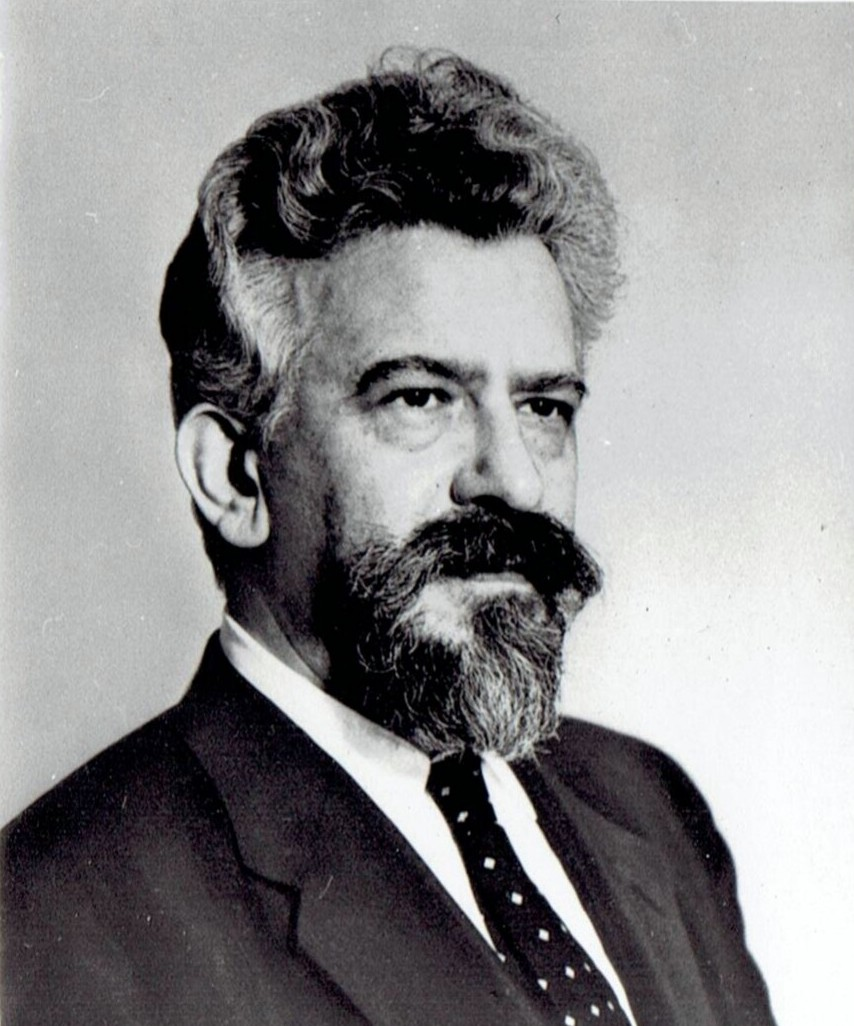
Rabbi Abraham Joshua Heschel dialogued closely with Cardinal Bea on the development of the document. He was selected by the American Jewish Committee to represent the position of Judaism.

The main aims of Heschel had been to encourage the alteration of the Catholic presentation of Jewish responsibility in regard to the trial and crucifixion of Jesus Christ (what is sometimes known as Jewish deicide). And in addition to this, he wanted a stop to any efforts, whether peaceful or not, at converting Jews to Christianity. While Cardinal Bea was highly sympathetic, attempting to present this within a framework of Catholic doctrinal orthodoxy, which it would require to pass through the council was proving difficult to achieve, for a number of reasons. Specifically, the Gospel of Matthew mentions the blood curse and the Gospel of John many similar themes. In addition to this, the Magisterium of the Catholic Church traditionally affirmed Extra Ecclesiam nulla salus and that the covenant with God, since Jesus Christ was exclusively with the Christians and that the Catholic Church is the New Israel (superseding any ancestry-based Old Covenant; rendering Jewish rites null and void). These teachings had passed down through the Gospels, many Church Fathers, Doctors of the Church and Ecumenical Councils over numerous centuries. Nevertheless, Cardinal Bea, with the blessing of John XXIII intended to press forward at the Second Session with these proposed changes. It had been decided that, after the setback of the Wardi affair, the schema, now entitled "On the Attitude of Catholics Toward Non-Christians and Especially Toward Jews" would be incorporated as a fourth chapter under a document "On Ecumenism"; this while a minor setback, was still satisfactory to its proposers because the drafting of that document also fell under the control of Bea's Secretariat.

The Second Session of the council began in the autumn of 1963 and by 8 November 1963 when "On Ecumenism", including its fourth chapter "On the Attitude of Catholics Toward Non-Christians and Especially Toward Jews" and fifth chapter "On Religious Liberty" was distributed to the Council Fathers, the liberals were confident, having gained in other areas of the Second Session. Elements in the Roman Curia, concerned that the chapters included heresy, approached Paul VI in private with severe concerns, accusing the Collegialists of setting up Bea as a de facto "Second Pope". A document was also published, "The Jews and the Council in the Light of Scripture and Tradition", arguing that the chapters were heretical. In addition to this, Paul VI was due to visit the Holy Places in East Jerusalem (then held by the Kingdom of Jordan) on 4 January 1964, whereby he would be meeting with Orthodox Patriarch Athenagoras I of Constantinople, with the ecumenical goal of mending the schism between Catholicism and Orthodoxy. Members of the Curia thus argued that approving the controversial chapter on the Jews would jeopardize this effort and leave the 400,000 Orthodox Christians in the Arab world (including many Palestinian Christians) almost certain to oppose any sort of reunification with Rome. The first to third schemas should be put up to consideration and then at some later date (only two weeks of the Second Session remained) the fourth and fifth schemas should be looked at again. The stalling tactic worked and when the Second Session closed without the issue being voted on, Moderator, Cardinal Gregorio Pietro Agagianian was non-committal on a future review of the chapters.

=== Third Session of the Council, 1963–1964 ===
==== Cardinal Cicognani's "middle path" revision ====
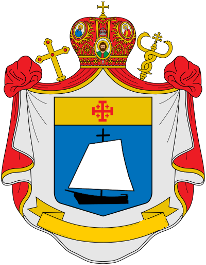
Arms of Arab Catholic leader Archbishop Maximos V Hakim of the Melkite Greek Catholic Church, who reported to Paul VI, warning of alleged "de-Christianisation" under the Israeli government

In the United States, where Western political power was centralised in the 1960s and most of the American Bishops represented at the council were staunch supporters of a pro-Jewish statement and a declaration on religious liberty—with the notable exception of Cardinal James Francis McIntyre—there was anxiety about the way the Second Session had ended voiced at the National Catholic Welfare Council. During Paul VI's visit to East Jerusalem, he travelled briefly through what was the State of Israel but was bogged down defending the record of Pius XII in light of The Deputy and made a speech hoping for Jews to convert to Christianity. While there, Maximos V Hakim, the Archbishop of Jerusalem from the Melkite Greek Catholic Church passed the Pope a document purporting to show "a slow but deliberate process of de-Christianization" initiated by the Israeli government. The concern of the American Bishops about the fate of the document was shared by the two secular Jewish points-of-contact for the American Bishops and thus the Vatican; Zacariah Shuster of the AJC and Joseph L. Lichten of the Anti-Defamation League of B’nai B’rith (Frith Becker of the World Jewish Congress also kept an eye on the proceedings, but took a more backseat role after the embarrassment caused by the Wardi affair). On the contested deicide issue, Cardinals Joseph Ritter, Albert Gregory Meyer, Richard Cushing and Francis Spellman were particularly insistent on supporting the Jewish position, as were Archbishop Patrick O'Boyle and Bishop Stephen Aloysius Leven; they also had the support of the Catholic Media Association. Some hope had been restored after six AJC members, headed up by Rose Sperry, had an audience with Paul VI in Rome and he personally agreed with the sentiment of Cardinal Spellman on the deicide issue.

A new draft document was prepared between January and September 1964. Paul VI had given the SECU orders to make mention of Islam and a general reference to non-Christian religions (in the hopes of alleviating the concerns of the Arab world; both the Eastern Catholics and the Arab governments). Also all reference to the much contested "deicide" issue would be removed due to the concerns the conservative faction had with it. This posed a problem for Cardinal Bea and his periti, as, if he agreed to making the document a general one about non-Christian religions, then it could be very easily argued that its drafting should fall under the newly created Secretariat for Non-Christians under Cardinal Paolo Marella, a conservative opponent of Bea. And if the SECU refused to make changes, it would naturally go back to Cardinal Cicognani's Coordinating Committee (a Curialist, upholding the Pope's agenda). Eventually, Bea agreed to remove the term "deicide", but deferred to the Coordinating Committee on adding statements about other non-Christian religions. With the document now under the Coordinating Committee, some restructuring took place: discreetly avoiding letting the American Cardinals know the details, especially. The new version highlighted, like the very first draft, Christianity as heirs of the Prophets, Patriarchs and covenant of the Old Testament, it expressed hope that the Jews will eventually convert to the Catholic Church (and thus Catholic sermons and catechesis, should avoid denigrating Jews). It also stated that the Church, "just as it severely disapproves of any wrong inflicted upon human beings everywhere, it also deplores and condemns hatred and maltreatment of Jews."

Around this time, Msgr George G. Higgins arranged an audience with Paul VI for Arthur Goldberg, the United States Ambassador to the United Nations. And then Cardinal Cushing arranged a meeting between Paul VI and Shuster, with Heschel also present. The Pope and Heschel clashed as the latter demanded the topics rejecting the deicide charge and blood guilt be reinserted and forbidding all Christian proselytising to Jews, to which Paul VI would not agree. Shuster somewhat embarrassed, spoke to Paul VI more diplomatically in French to cut Heschel out (as a secular man, Shuster was less concerned about the proselytising issue). Like Jules Isaac before him, Heschel invoked the Holocaust, in an article from September 1964 he wrote, "I am ready to go to Auschwitz any time, if faced with the alternative of conversion or death."

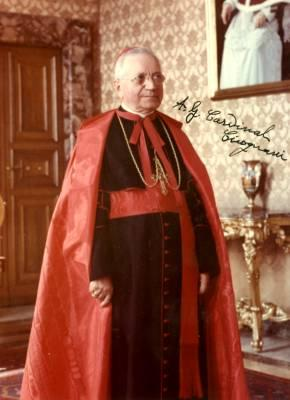
Cardinal Amleto Giovanni Cicognani's "middle path" re-drafted version of September 1964, favoured by Paul VI, alienated both sides in the debate.

Paul VI made his position known on the general direction of the council, with his August 1964 encyclical Ecclesiam suam, in which he tried to portray a cautious reformist position. He warned about relativism and even modernism, laying out a dialogue with the world which was still directed towards the ideal of conversion of non-Catholics, but on a practical level advocated cooperation for defending "religious liberty, human brotherhood, good culture, social welfare, and civil order." For the first time, during the Third Session of the Second Vatican Council, the contents of the draft schema "On the Jews and Non-Christians", was actually discussed on the floor by Council Fathers from 28 September 1964 and lasted two days. The "middle-ground" approach of the Paul VI-Cicognani revision (with the word deicide removed and mention of Islam, Hinduism and Buddhism included), while trying to please all factions managed to alienate all sides in the process. Cardinal Ernesto Ruffini, Archbishop of Palermo representing the conservative faction, concerned with Catholic doctrinal integrity in rejecting the document, warned against "Talmudic teachings" and stated at the podium; "It is clear that Christians love Jews, for such is the law of Christians, but Jews should be exhorted to cease hating us and regarding us as contemptible animals." As ever, Catholic leaders from the Arab world also spoke out against any document focusing exclusively on the Jews without any mention of the Muslims, including: Cardinal Patriarch Ignatius Gabriel I Tappouni of the Syriac Catholic Church, Patriarch Maximos IV Saigh and Bishop Joseph Tawil of the Melkite Greek Catholic Church and Archbishop Pietro Sfair of the Maronite Church. Sfair was instrumental during the drafting of the Second Vatican Council document Nostra Aetate to highlight the House of Mary (in Ephesus, Turkey) and Marian devotion as a matter of shared interest between Christians and Muslims.

Archbishop P. Sfair of the Maronite Rite (Rome) considered the reference which the declaration De non christianis made to the Muslims'adoration of the one and remunerating God as insufficient. Mention should also be made of Mohammed's affirmation of the virginal conception and birth of Christ through Mary, the most exalted among women. The Archbishop recalled the respect with which the earliest Muslims treated the Christians and the Christian beliefs. He insisted that the declaration should give greater consideration to that which the Muslims believed, to the truths which they proposed for belief, than to their less essential cultural factors.

The combined liberalising factions; headed up by the Rhineland Alliance and the American Cardinals; held different approaches, with ultimately the same goal in mind. One group, consisting of Cardinals Joseph Ritter of St. Louis, Albert Gregory Meyer of Chicago, Franz König of Vienna and Achille Liénart of Lille (supported by Bishops Elchinger and Méndez Arceo) took to the podium and spoke clearly against the "watered down" Paul VI-Cicognani revision and supported a full return to the previous draft authored by Cardinal Bea and the SECU, with the repudiation of the deicide theme against Jews of any generation clearly included. The other group, consisting of Cardinals Richard Cushing of Boston, Giacomo Lercaro of Bologna and Paul-Émile Léger of Montreal (supported by Bishops Nierman, Daem, Jaeger, Pocock and O'Boyle) proposed instead that the new draft should be accepted, to get its foot in the door, but amended to cover the deicide issue and an explicitly condemnation of what they called "persecutions and injustices" against Jews throughout the ages, to the present day. Two Americans, Bishop Leven and Archbishop O'Boyle, took the most radical position on the topic and proposed the document should repudiate any hope of Jewish conversion to Christianity, flirting with themes of universal salvation and dual-covenant theology respectively. Cardinal John Heenan, the English Archbishop of Westminster, also spoke in favour of the liberal faction on the issue at a press conference the following day. On the deicide question, he admitted that “Jesus Christ was condemned to death by the Sanhedrin,” but "the Jewish people as such cannot be held guilty for the death of Christ." He affirmed to "do all [he] could to satisfy the desires of [his] Jewish friends." The document was sent back to the SECU for amendments on 29 September 1964 with over 70 suggestions.

==== Cardinal Felici's letters, return to the SECU ====
The political backlash was immediate: Salah al-Din al-Bitar, the Ba'athist Prime Minister of Syria announced "world Zionism and Israel are trying to mobilize Catholics against the Arabs" and that the declaration "cannot be considered to be a purely religious matter.” Charles Helou, the President of Lebanon arranged for ten Bishops from the Levant and North Africa to telegram the Pope stating that the "Gospels teach clearly the Jewish crime of deicide. In this matter of the Jewish declaration. we see clearly the intrigues of Zionist politics." Similar statements were made by the Coptic Orthodox Church of Alexandria, at the insistence of the Egyptian government. The political implications of the document was discussed privately at the Cairo Conference of the Non-Aligned Movement in October 1964 between Syrian, Lebanese and Egyptian delegates. It was agreed that they would not make a public statement on the issue at the Conference but that Sukarno, President of Indonesia, would discuss it with Paul VI during his visit on 12 October 1964. At this meeting, Sukarno warned that all Vatican diplomatic missions in Arab countries might be closed if the document was adopted. At the same time that Sukarno was visiting Rome, a Palestinian delegation lodged a complaint with the Vatican about the document, seeing it as favouring Zionism by proxy, despite the assurances of the Vatican that it was not political in nature.

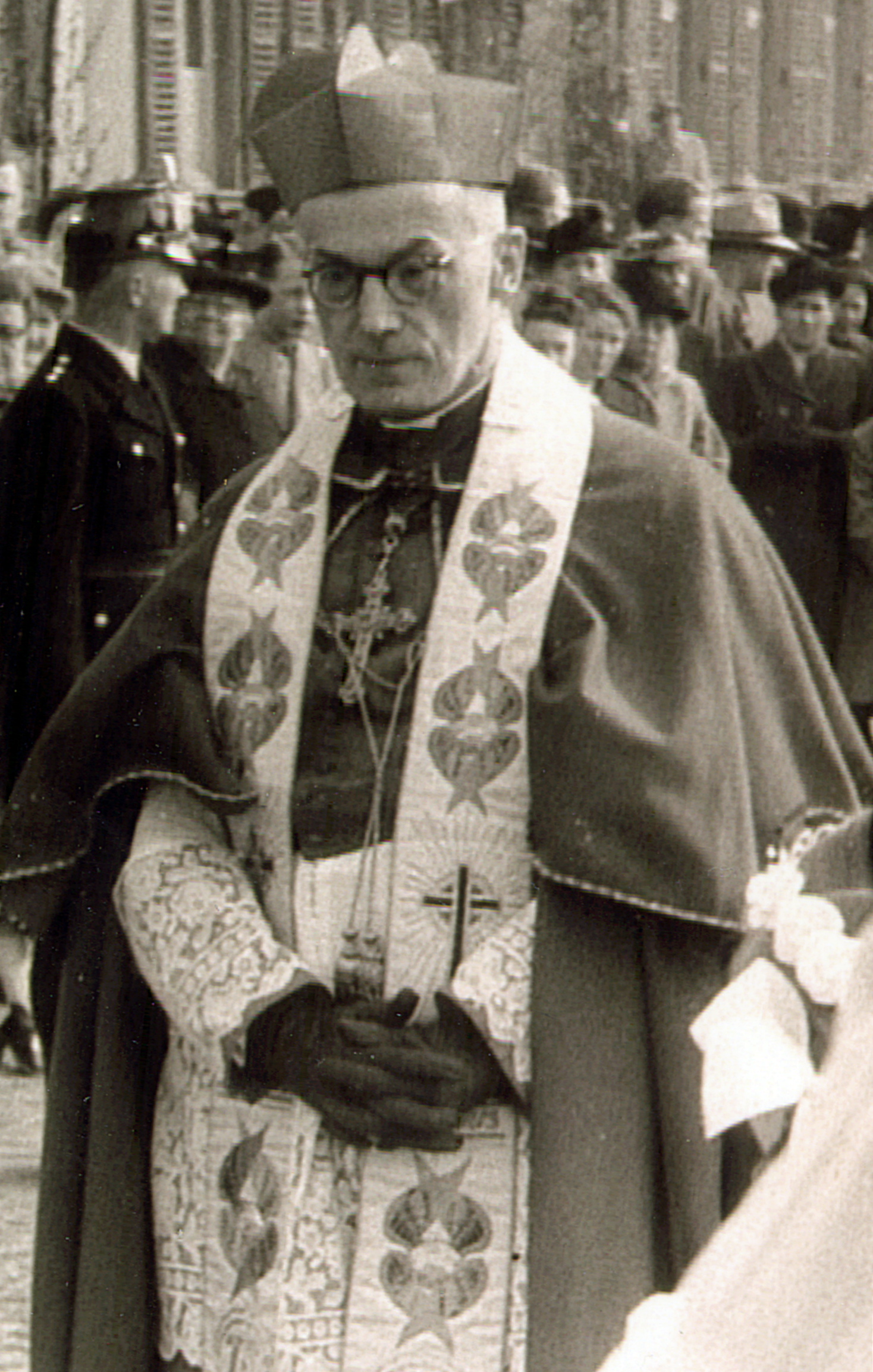
Cardinal Josef Frings organised a letter of protest against elements within the Roman Curia who wanted to cancel the document during the Third Session.

In the middle of this crisis, two letters had been received by Bea from Cardinal Pericle Felici, Secretary General of the council on 9 October 1964. It dealt with two key documents under the auspices of the SECU; "On Religious Liberty" and "On the Jews and Non-Christians". The letter stated that Paul VI wanted a completely new text to be drafted on religious liberty, with a more mixed commission involved in creating the draft; including the addition of Archbishop Marcel Lefebvre (Superior General of the Holy Ghost Fathers), Cardinal Michael Browne, Fr. Aniceto Fernández Alonso (Master of the Order of Preachers) and Cardinal Giovanni Colombo. Of these men, the first three were unambiguously hostile to the document and the latter was a personal favourite of Paul VI. Meanwhile, the Jewish issue would not be addressed in a stand-alone document, but would become part of Schema 13. This too would be rewritten by a more mixed commission including members drawn from Bea's Secretariat and Cardinal Alfredo Ottaviani's Doctrinal Commission. Cardinal Felici's two letters were "leaked" by Malachi Martin and became features in publications such as The New York Times.

The liberals, drawn from the Rhineland Alliance and the American Cardinals, arranged a memorandum to be issued to the Pope to protest this in the strongest terms. A gathering took place at the residence of Cardinal Josef Frings of Cologne, where a number of other Cardinals added their voice to the petition. Supporters of the Frings motion explicitly named by the media included longtime interested parties Cardinals Ritter, Meyer, König, Liénart and Lercaro, along with Cardinals Raúl Silva Henríquez of Chile, Julius Döpfner of Munich, Joseph-Charles Lefèbvre of Bourges, Bernardus Johannes Alfrink of Utrecht and Leo Joseph Suenens of Brussels. This was highly significant as it included three out of four Moderators of the Second Vatical Council (only the Eastern Catholic Moderator, Cardinal Gregorio Pietro Agagianian, did not sign up to it). They wanted the return of the Jewish document and the document on religious liberty to the SECU, they wanted to complain that the conservative minority were already able to "water down" some of the more radical elements in documents that had already been voted on and they were opposed to delaying the Council any further (rumours had abounded that Paul VI wanted to delay the council as it stood for three years, so the subjects covered could mature for a Fourth Session). With this memorandum in hand, the leader of the faction, Cardinal Frings held a meeting with Paul VI on 13 November 1964 to express the concerns of the liberal Council fathers. Frings demanded that the Pope not intervene unilaterally (invoking the recent victories for Collegiality) and to follow the procedural rules established by the council. Paul VI intimated that he would take into consideration concerns, but also wanted to go more slowly, holding that radical steps would confuse and alienate the Catholic faithful in places like Italy, Spain and Latin America.

Not just on this question, but in general, the Third Session of the Second Vatican Council had been a disaster for the conservative faction in the lead up to the presentation of the Jewish document in September 1964. Lumen gentium had been voted in favour of which endorsed Collegiality and married lay deacons. Unitatis redintegratio allowed for closer ecumenical ties with non-Catholics and allowed for all who are baptised the "right to be called Christian", endorsing in some cases for common worship. The proposed stand-alone document on Mariology, which was to declare the Blessed Virgin Mary the Mediatrix of All Graces (something Protestants would not accept), was thrown out and subsumed under Lumen gentium. As well as the document on the Jews, there was still outstanding a document proclaiming religious liberty and also Schema 13 on the horizon, with debates on issues such as contraception, birth control, conscientious objection, disarmament, etc., no longer completely off the table. Thus, the conservative minority were fighting a rear-guard action on numerous fronts. At a meeting held on the same day as Frings’ audience with Paul VI, the conservative grouping the Coetus Internationalis Patrum under the Presidency of Archbishop Geraldo de Proença Sigaud met with Cardinal Ruffini in attendance to discuss what they should do next. They were confidence that Paul VI would never allow a stand-alone Jewish document due to the mounting Arab political pressure and decided, contrary to what Cardinal Felici had laid out, they would work against the Jewish issue being covered in Schema 13 (this document, On the Church in the Modern World, was going to pass, just its final composition was still in play and if the Jewish issue was under it then it could slip through). This would prove to be a tactical blunder.

==== Black Thursday, Council fathers vote ====
Following these discussions, the SECU under Bea prepared a new draft very favourable to the position of the liberals. The document stripped out all mention of conversion of Jews and condemning accusations of "deicide" was back. This, despite carrying a more ambiguous title, with Jews no longer explicitly highlighted, with the Declaration on the Church's Relationship to Non-Christian Religions. Bea hoped that Paul VI would be favourably disposed to this, with his upcoming visit to Bombay in the Republic of India, as a sympathetic comment on Hinduism was also included, alongside generic statements against "discrimination." When the document came to Cardinal Ottaviani's Theological Commission for examination, the Commission refused to incorporate it into Schema 13 and without proposing alterations to the text, simply returned it to the SECU. Then it went back to Cardinal Cicognani's Coordinating Committee (who, technically could not alter the text). The Egyptian Ministry of Guidance had got wind of the new draft through conservative allies in Rome and was preparing a memorandum from Christian leaders in the Arab world against it on 28 October 1964. Cicognani, who wanted to delay the document, wanted Egypt's memorandum to be brought to Paul VI's attention first. The memorandum asked why Rome would side with "10 million Jews over 100 million Arabs" and brought up the issue of Jewish deicide. On the other side, the American Cardinals (except McIntyre) and the Moderators of the council (from the Rhineland Alliance) were equally turning up the diplomatic pressure.

The pressure of the American Cardinals (including on their side the American media) and support from most of the Council Fathers, as well as the increasingly blunt approach of the Egyptians had made it difficult for the Pope to do anything but order the printing of the new version of the document. Cicognani delayed for eight days as the end of the Third Session was approaching and proposed a maneuver, wherein the three "natural" parts of the document would be voted on individually; Hinduism and Buddhism as the first, Islam as the second and then the more controversial and keenly contested section on Judaism as third. It was decided that the showdown on two of the most fought over documents would take place successively; the document On Religious Liberty would be released on 17 November 1964 with a vote on 19 November, while Relations with Non-Christians would be released on 18 November 1964 with a vote promised for 20 November.

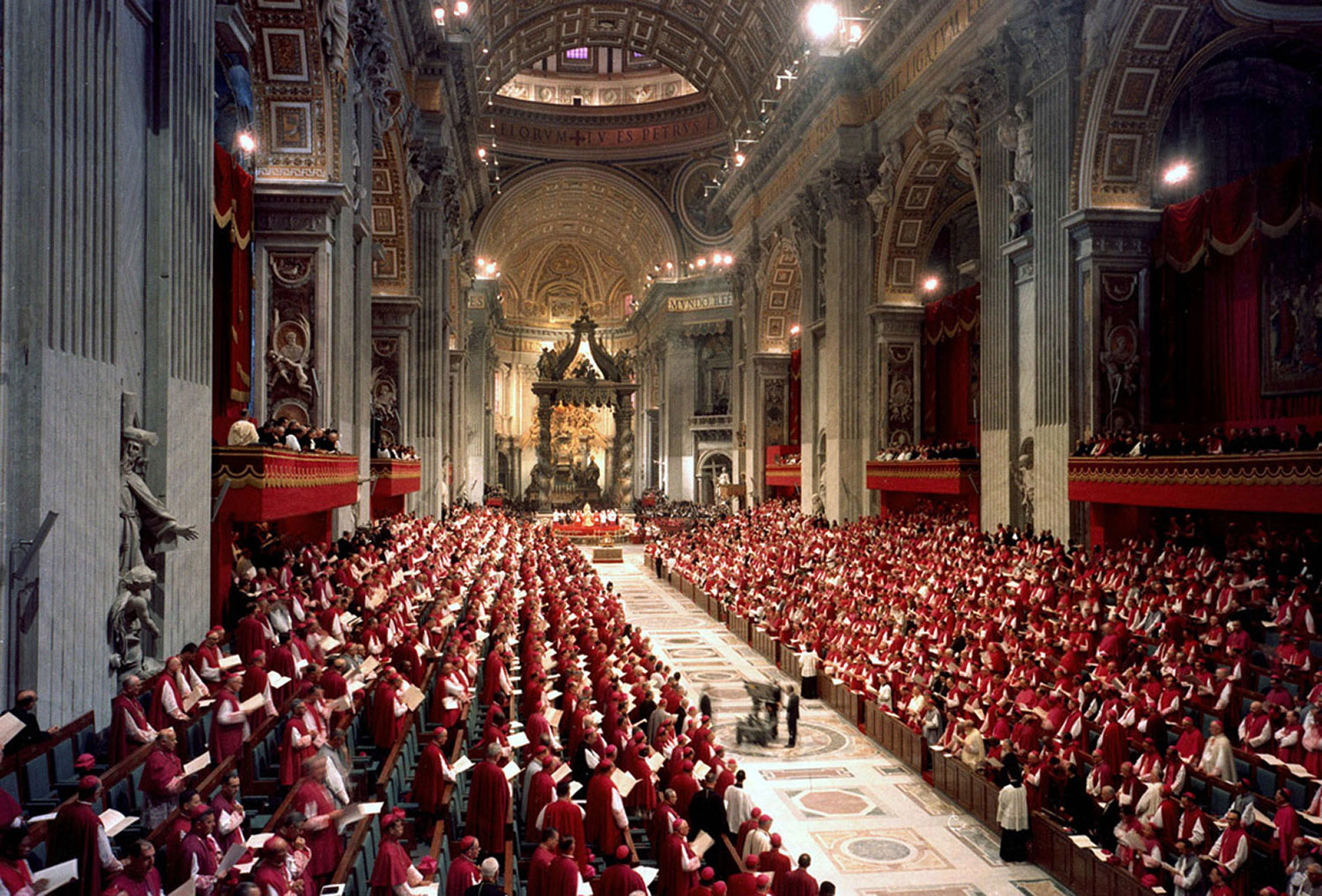
A photograph of the Second Vatican Council in Session. A vote on the document Relations with Non-Christians finally took place in November 1964 and was passed with the support of around 89% of the present Council Fathers.

The main battle was seen as the document On Religious Liberty and Relations with Non-Christians was closely connected to it but flowed downstream from it. The liberal and conservative factions were much the same with both documents and indeed the American theologian John Courtney Murray, keenly supported by most of the American Cardinals, had provided the underpinning principles of the text On Religious Liberty. The fiercely contested nature of the documents came to a head in what is known as Black Thursday or the "day of the bomb" (la bomba oggi). On the Thursday, when Cardinal Eugène Tisserant arose to announce that no vote would be taking place on that document due to 250 to 300 wishing for it to be delayed, uproar broke out on the floor of the Third Session. Cardinals Meyer and Ritter argued openly with Cardinals Siri and Ruffini at the table of the Council Presidents and the American Bishop Francis Frederick Reh, Rector of the Pontifical North American College, took up a paper and began a petition among the angry Bishops, which garnered 1,500 supporters. The Americans—Cardinals Ritter, Meyer and Leger—stormed off to confront the Pope. Paul VI was watching the proceedings on close circuit television and had Cardinal Felici called to restore order to the proceedings. Bishop Émile-Joseph De Smedt, a prominent liberal clergymen and talented orator, took to the podium and explained in a matter of a fact manner how, why and who was responsible for delaying the vote on the document, to applause.

The Pope, having decided on a course of action that the vote on the document On Religious Liberty would be suspended until a Fourth Session, could not back down lest he undermine his own authority. And so the Third Session entered its finally voting day deeply divided, with the liberal faction deeply frustrated and political, diplomatic and media hostility from states on both sides of the Cold War conflict; East and West; hostile to the idea of the confessional state, aimed at the Holy See. Attempts to introduce a relaxed atmosphere and mollify the Bishops with the announcement that those in attendance would be given a gold medal and that new powers would be conferred upon the General Superiors changed little. Even the most ardent member of the Roman Curia opposed to a document on Judaism, Cardinal Ruffini, at this point relented with international hostility aimed at the Holy See over the issue of religious liberty, admitting that a vote go ahead on Cardinal Bea's Relations with Non-Christians, with the fight over the "bigger fish" On Religious Liberty successfully delayed for another day. There would be no split vote on different religions, all of the parts of the document would be voted on as a single entity. An overwhelming majority of the Council Fathers, 89%, voted in favour of the document, making Relations with Non-Christians an official document of the Second Vatican Council at the close of the Third Session. The document itself had not yet been promulgated by the Pope, so there was possibility for alteration to the text, but it could not now be removed from the council.

=== Fourth Session of the Council, 1964–1965 ===
While leaders of the Jewish community in the United States had been elated by the ending of the Third Session, the exact nature of the text was not set in stone and there was still room to "nuance" or "qualify" the final text within Council rules. Between the closure of the Third Session on 21 November 1964 and the opening of the Fourth Session on 14 September 1965, a couple of controversies pertaining to the issue arose. Firstly, Luigi Maria Carli, the Bishop of Segni (a historically important diocese close to Rome) and member of the Coetus Internationalis Patrum wrote an article entitled, La questione giudaica davanti al Concilio Vaticano II in his diocesan magazine in February 1965 that affirmed the traditional teaching of the Catholic Church on the matter: namely, that adherents of Rabbinic Judaism at the time of Christ and to the present day, bore guilt for the trial and crucifixion of Christ and that "judgment of condemnation by God" hung over Judaism. The President of the American Jewish Committee bewailed the article as an "anti-Semitic attack." A few weeks later on Passion Sunday, Paul VI himself, within the sermon during Mass in Rome, spoke of the role played by Jews of the time in the crucifixion of Jesus Christ (to the disappointment of Elio Toaff, the Chief Rabbi of Rome).

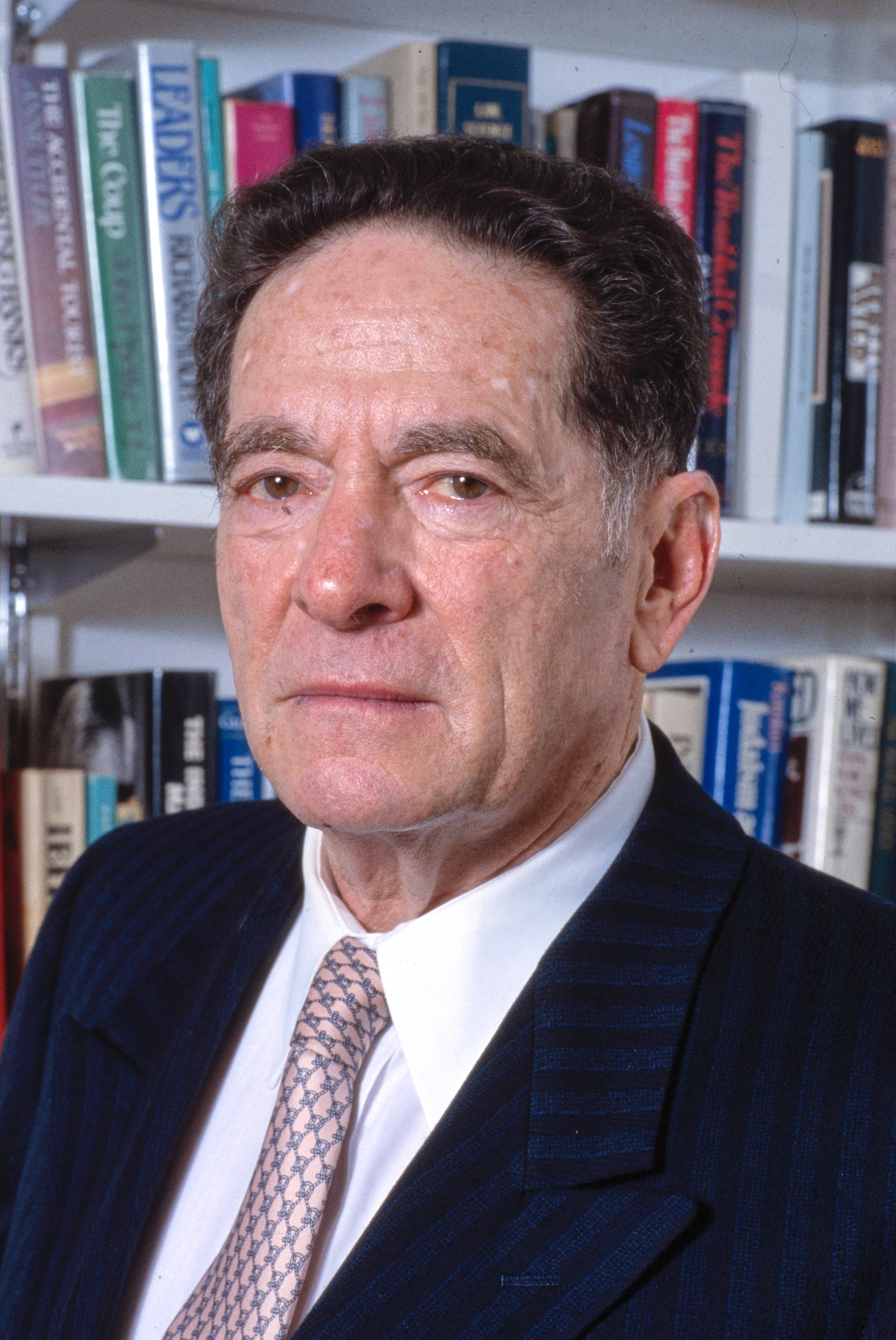
Cardinal Bea met with Morris B. Abram, President of the American Jewish Committee and attempted to reassure him in regard to the status of the document and contemporary controversies.

Most significant of all was the reporting in The New York Times by their Rome-correspondent Robert C. Dotty, that Paul VI had turned the document over to four doctrinal "consultants", to make it not contradict Sacred Scripture and to mollify Arab opinion. Cardinal Bea was visiting New York that week and denied these claims, stating that it was still under the SECU and he sought to clear up any misunderstandings with Morris B. Abram of the American Jewish Committee about the Passion Sunday and Bishop Carli controversies. Nevertheless, in Rome, discussions were taking place about modifications to Chapter 4 in May 1965: the word "deicide" was removed from the document forever, and additionally, Paul VI suggested adapting the phrase “deplores, indeed condemns, hatred and persecution of Jews” in order to exclude the words “indeed condemns”. These changes were voted on and accepted by elements of Bea's Secretariat and the final form of the document had been reached. While this was taking place, the Maronite President of Lebanon, Charles Helou had an audience with the Pope and consequently, due to rumours which reached across the Atlantic, the Vatican Press Office made statements saying that the declaration remained unchanged. In the New York Times, Dotty was publishing articles with dubious claims that the document was "under study" (when it had already been completed) and that the document may be dropped completely. These and other similar articles led to criticisms of the Church from Willem Visser 't Hooft, the Protestant head of the World Council of Churches who warned that if the Jewish issue was removed there would be consequences for ecumenism. The AJC similarly, through the person of Rabbi Tanenbaum, confronted Msgr George G. Higgins, who passed on the concerns to Cardinal Cushing. The Deutscher Koordinierungsrat der Gesellschaften für Christlich-Jüdische Zusammenarbeit also sent a letter to Rome complaining that there was now a "crisis of confidence vis-à-vis the Catholic Church.”

The earlier "tactical leaks" strategy involving Malachi Martin, the AJC's mole who fed the New York Times and TIME, to push the document in a direction desired by the American Jewish community was no longer effectual: Martin had been released from his priestly vows to the Jesuits in May–June 1965. The final form of the document had been released to the public, revealing that the Jewish elements had been watered down. A number of significant events took place that year, which garnered media attention: in October 1965, Paul VI became the first Pope to address the United Nations calling for “No more war, war never again.” While visiting the United States, at a Mass attended by 40,000 people at the Yankee Stadium in New York City (with millions more watching on television), Paul VI quoted John 20:19 from the Gospel of John which states "the disciples were bolted for fear of the Jews, Jesus came and stood before them and said "Peace be to you!"." While intended as a friendly message in "the world's most Jewish city", there were widespread misunderstandings and many Jews and liberal Catholics criticised the sermon as "unthinking" and linked this to the development of the document on the Jews. With the final vote approaching on 14 October 1965, both Jewish and Arab lobbies doubled-down and pushed for their agendas: Shuster of the AJC wanted the "weakening" of the document completely reversed, while a final 28-page Arab request was submitted, urging the Catholic Bishops to save the faith from “communism and atheism and the Jewish-Communist alliance."

While the form of the final document to be put to the floor at the Fourth Session of the Second Vatican Council had been disappointing to Shuster and Lichten of the AJC and B’nai B’rith respectively, Higgins convinced them that it was better to "settle for what they could get." Bishop Stephen Aloysius Leven gave some false hope to his friends in the American Jewish community that the American bishops could still vote against the new version but upon realising that this would simply add votes to the Arab & conservative side who wanted no document at all, the tactic was abandoned. By this point, even Cardinal Bea was content for the "deicide" issue to be dropped so long as the document was finally promulgated. Fr. René Laurentin, also wrote a late plea to strengthen the Jewish aspect of the document, but by now momentum was against further revisions. In its final form, 1,763 voted in favour of the document and 250 bishops opposed it. It was subsequently promulgated on 28 October 1965 by Pope Paul VI as Nostra aetate ("In our time"). The media in the United States and Europe subsequently ran with sensationalistic headlines such as "Vatican Pardons Jews" and "Jews Exonerated in Rome", despite the fact that the deicide issue had now been removed from the document. Meanwhile, diplomatic statements were prepared by the AJC and B'nai B'rith, which tried to focus on what they saw as the positives while also airing their disappointment that some of the biggest issues had been dropped and the document much watered down from previous versions. The most vocal critic was Rabbi Heschel, who described avoiding dealing with the deicide issue as “an act of paying homage to Satan.”

== Opposition ==
Nostra aetate, along with the adjacent documents, Dignitatis humanae (On Religious Liberty), Unitatis redintegratio (On Ecumenism), and Lumen gentium (The Church) are among the documents from the Second Vatican Council that are frequently highlighted for the most scathing criticism by traditional Catholics. The central accusation, from traditionalist Catholics, is that these documents express and encourage a spirit of religious indifferentism, that is to say that they dissuade the conversion of non-Catholics (contrary to the Catholic doctrine of Extra Ecclesiam nulla salus and thus, within this context, exclude them from the possibility of attaining eternal salvation), that they also discourage or confuse those who are already Catholic by suggesting that other religions may have validity, and that there is a radical discontinuity with what the Catholic Church has already proclaimed Magisterially about non-Christian religions.

== Post-Conciliar developments ==
To flesh out these implications and ramifications, the Vatican's Commission for Interreligious Relations with the Jews issued its Guidelines and Suggestions for Implementing the Conciliar Declaration Nostra Aetate in late 1974. The Commission later released Notes on the Correct Way to Present Jews and Judaism in the Teaching and Catechesis of the Roman Catholic Church in 1985.

The U.S. Congress passed a resolution acknowledging the fortieth anniversary of Nostra aetate.

The Vatican's Commission for Religious Relations with Jews released a new document exploring the unresolved theological questions at the heart of Christian–Jewish dialogue. Entitled The Gifts and Calling of God are Irrevocable, it marked the 50th anniversary of the ground-breaking declaration Nostra Aetate.

On the fiftieth anniversary of the document's release, Sayyid Syeed, the national director of the Islamic Society of North America's Office for Interfaith and Community Alliances, pointed out that Nostra Aetate was released during the 1960s civil rights movement in the United States, at a time when Islamic centers and student groups were being founded on university campuses, and from these humble beginnings the "Catholic church acted as a big brother" in its understanding of a religious minority, a sentiment that has continued since the terrorist attacks of 9/11 when the Church opened its doors to them amidst growing Islamophobia.

== See also ==
- Dignitatis humanae
- Dominus Iesus
- Ut unum sint
- Unitatis redintegratio
- Jules Isaac
- John Paul II Center for Interreligious Dialogue
- Pontifical Council for Interreligious Dialogue
- Abu Dhabi declaration

Drafters

- John M. Oesterreicher
- Gregory Baum
- Bruno Hussar
