= Rachel Dror =

German-Jewish teacher and Holocaust survivor (1921–2024)

- רחל דרור
- Born: Rachel Zipora Lewin; 19 January 1921; Königsberg, East Prussia, Prussia, Germany
- Died: 14 December 2024 (aged 103)
- Occupations: Policewoman; Special needs teacher Holocaust witness Campaigner for Mutual Jewish-Christian tolerance
- Children: 2

Rachel Zipora Dror (née Lewin; Hebrew: רחל ציפורה דרור; 19 January 1921 – 14 December 2024) was a German Jewish teacher and Holocaust survivor. After returning from Israel to live in West Germany (for health reasons) in 1957, and more intensively since her retirement from teaching in 1986, she has come to wider prominence because of her engagement for Christian-Jewish-Islamic co-existence, and as an advocate for religious openness and mutual tolerance. She turned 100 on 19 January 2021.

== Life ==
=== Provenance and early years ===
Rachel Lewin was born in the East Prussian capital, Königsberg on 19 January 1921. Chaim Hugo Lewin (1891–1944), her father, like his brother Hermann Zvi Lewin (1878–1976), had fought in the First World War, emerging from military service as a highly decorated former officer. Her mother, born Erna Rosenbaun (1893–1944), came originally from Halberstadt in central Germany. Rachel grew up in a traditional Jewish family, albeit in a family that would at the time have been considered well integrated into German society more generally. She attended a government secondary school ("Lyzeum"), while also receiving a parallel religious education at a Jewish religious school.

=== The Hitler difference ===
Rachel would later look back on an idyllic childhood, prematurely ended when the Hitler government took power in January 1933 and lost no time in transforming Germany into a one-party dictatorship. Antisemitism, hitherto a chilling mantra served up by noisy populist street-politicians, became a core underpinning of government strategy. After March 1933, when Rachel was still aged only twelve, a slightly older boy who had become a friend (and admirer) was no longer permitted to come to the house. Her mother explained that this was because she was Jewish and he was not. From then on, she was required to sit in the back row of her class at school. Six months later her parents received a letter stating simply that she was not on course to reach her targets. She was switched to a middle school where harassment continued: she would later recall being denied permission to visit the toilet when the need arose. She decided that she would no longer attend the school.

=== Apprenticeship ===
In 1935 she embarked on an apprenticeship for work as a seamstress. In March 1936 she concluded that the intensification of antisemitic legislation meant that she could expect no future in Germany. She joined a Zionist youth group: between May 1936 and November 1938 she lived in Hamburg where the focus of her life was on preparing for emigration to Palestine, which since 1920 had been administered, for most purposes, as though a component territory of the British Empire. Hamburg was an economically dynamic city with a long mercantile tradition which over the years had made it more open to ethnic and cultural diversity more cosmopolitan than Königsberg in the east. So, initially, she found it, a reassuring sense of belonging being strengthened by the fact that she was one of a group of 27 young people all staying at the same Hamburg address at one end of the "Klosterallee" (street) and all preparing actively for emigration to Palestine.

=== "Poland Action" ===
On 28 October 1938, a member of the group called Wolfgang Drechsler, whom one source describes as Rachel Lewin's boyfriend, was arrested and swiftly deported. This was part of the so-called Poland Action which involved the arrest and deportation of approximately 17,000 Polish Jews who were stripped of any cash or other valuables and then placed on trains which transported them to the Polish border. The experience led Rachel Lewin to quit the "Klosterallee" group and move in with her mother's elder sister, Flora Rosenbaum, who taught at the Talmud Tora School in Hamburg's Grindel district.

=== "Pogrom night" ===
Two weeks later came Pogrom Night (often identified in English language sources as "Kristallnacht"), during which, over in Königsberg, her parents' property was destroyed or plundered in a national government-directed anti-Jewish pogrom. Rachel Lewin slept through the night untroubled in her aunt's house. The next morning, however, she witnessed Jews being beaten up and chased through the Hamburg streets by Nazi paramilitaries. Unsure what was going on, she pushed her way through the crowd gathering at the newsstand on which newspapers were piled up, showing photographs of the overnight campaign of arson, looting and bloodshed. The news vendor, whom till now had always seemed a friendly soul, spotted her, and giving a fair rendering of the Berlin dialect snarled, "So, little Jew, do you too want to see how your synagogues burned?" (Note: "Na, Judje, willste auch sehen, wie deine Synagogen brannten?".) The memory of that morning would never leave her. When she returned to her aunt's house, her aunt was able to tell her more about what had happened. Most of the teachers and some of the students at the Grindel Talmud Tora School at which Flora Rosenbaum taught had already been arrested. Desperately worried about her family, Rachel Lewin managed to contact her father who ordered her to come home. When she reached Königsberg she found her parents living with her younger brother, Abraham, in the small apartment to which they had been forced to move. Abraham had been so traumatised by the violence and destruction he had witnessed that he had acquired a sudden and severe speech impediment. Meanwhile, her father carried the recent scars of a serious head injury which, she learned, had been inflicted using the handle of an oven.

=== Escape ===
Pogrom Night convinced Rachel Lewin that she needed to leave Germany and emigrate to Palestine even if she had to do it alone. (Her Hamburg Hakhshara group had by now been smashed by the authorities.) In Königsberg there were frantic discussions within the family. Her father thought it unrealistic to leave the country. They had never been prosperous and now most of what they had previously owned had been destroyed or stolen. Even rich people by this time faced prohibitively high and frequently arbitrary "emigration taxes" if wishing to emigrate using official channels. From the south-east of Germany there were now organised underground groups devoted to smuggling victims of political or race persecution across the border to Czechoslovakia, but Königsberg was nowhere near Czechoslovakia and it seems in any case unlikely that the Lewins would have had the relevant contacts. Rachel's mother, in particular, was already in failing health and considered herself more German than Jewish. Things could not go on getting worse for ever. Rachel's parents, and in particular her mother, found it unthinkable that the situation would not in the future improve for Jews in Hitler's Germany. It is not clear how Rachel Lewin made her way from Königsberg to Trieste, which had been an Italian city since approximately 1920. She left Germany, according to one source, on 20 April 1939. On 29 April 1939 the last legally sanctioned ship destined for "British" Palestine (till after the war broke out five months later) set sail for Haifa from Trieste. Rachel Lewin was on board.

It would be another seventeen years before she would find out what had happened to her parents. Avraham Lewin, her younger brother, was rescued and escaped in 1940 on the last Kindertransport. He survived for nearly ten years in England and then emigrated to become a founder member of the Kibbutz Lavi in northern Israel. There was no Kindertransport for her parents, who had belatedly applied for permission to emigrate to Palestine. But for British officials, to whom that Hugo and Erna Lewin were classified as Germans, there could be no question of their application to emigrate to "British" Palestine being considered.

=== Palestine ===
Her parents no longer had money: the ticket money necessary for the journey to Palestine had been sent over by her father's youngest sister, who had been living in Palestine since 1913. On her arrival in Haifa Rachel Lewin was therefore not completely alone, and for some time she lived with her Aunt Anna. Early on during her time in Palestine/Israel she studied at an agriculture college.

=== Israel ===
The state of Israel was proclaimed during 1948, and in the same year Rachel Lewin joined the Israeli police service. According to her own later recollection she thereby became Israel's first policewoman. The only available alternative would have been to join the Israeli army, but an uncle had recommended that she should rather join the police. Her responsibilities included road safety. Duties extended to traffic safety training in 25 schools.

Rachel Lewin became Rachel Dror when she married in 1951. At the time when they met, her future husband was working as a transport engineer in the north of the country. Sources are resolutely silent about his identity, but it is known that Rachel Dror's daughter was born in 1952. Elsewhere she is described as the mother of two children.

Shortly after the birth of her daughter in 1952 Rachel Dror and her husband took a walk in downtown Haifa, intending to enjoy a night out. They were approached by a woman: "You're Hugo Lewin's daughter", she stated (correctly). The strange woman recognised Rachel from a photograph that Hugo Lewin had kept in his pocket, and insisted on showing as many people as he could, while being taken to the Auschwitz concentration camp. The woman was able to tell Rachel what had happened to her parents. Hugo and Erna Lewin escaped to Italy in 1940, which at that time was politically allied to Germany. There they were able to hide in Italy between March 1940 and February 1944. By 1944 Italy was no longer militarily engaged as a German ally, and the German Army, having asserted military control over the country, was fighting a grim rear-guard action in the context of civil war and an Anglo-American offensive from the south. It was in this confused context that Hugo and Erna Lewin were found by a German soldier who placed them on a train back to Germany. Their journey ended at the Auschwitz death camp. Here their train was met by the camp doctor Josef Mengele who identified and separated out those deemed fit for work from those whom he thought unfit. Erna Lewin was already clearly in poor health and she was sent with the unfit prisoners while Hugo was sent in the other direction with those destined for manual work. He, however, refused to be separated from his wife, with the result that both Hugo and Erna Lewin were murdered very soon after their arrival at the camp.

=== A new kind of Germany ===
In 1957 Rachel Dror returned to Europe with her family on "health grounds". Later she would explain to interviewers that she had been unable to cope with Israel's dry hot climate. She also sensed that some of the euphoric optimism that had accompanied the creation of the state in 1948/49, and in which she had shared to the full, was by the later 1950s beginning to fade. She had wanted to relocate to England here her younger brother had spent the war years, but these were the Wirtschaftswunder years in West Germany, and she allowed herself to be persuaded by her husband, who as a young man had studied in Germany, that opportunities would be better in West Germany than in England. (Königsberg, where she had spent her truncated childhood, had been "ethnically cleansed" of its German-speaking population in 1944/45, and was now part of the Soviet Union.) Her first job in post-war Germany was in a bank. The little family lived briefly in Berlin and Frankfurt before eventually settling in Stuttgart. By the time she began to study for a new career, as a teacher, Rachel Dror was 46. Between 1967 and 1986 she worked as a teacher of visual arts and technology at a special school for the speech impaired.

== Witness and engagement ==
Many of Rachel Dror's relatives were murdered and / or bereaved through the Holocaust. For many years after the 1945 collapse of the Hitler nightmare, and even after returning to live in Germany in 1957, the suffering that the Holocaust had brought to her family was one topic that this otherwise garrulous special education teacher had no wish to discuss in public. That changed in 1978. That year, while attending a regional teachers' conference, she fell into conversation with Edgar Winckler who was an executive board member of the Stuttgart Society for Christian-Jewish collaboration ("...Christlich-Jüdische Zusammenarbeit" / CJZ). After discovering that, in a former life, Rachel Dror had worked as a policewoman in northern Israel, he commented that the CJZ board needed a woman. Shortly after that, she found herself co-opted onto the board of the Stuttgart Society for Christian-Jewish collaboration. Dror's personal Holocaust experience would, from now on, be harder to keep to herself. Not long afterwards she found herself participating with Heinz Lauber in a seminar at the CJZ regional headquarters. Heinz Lauber was a senior government official ("Leitender Regierungsdirektor") As they talked, he mentioned that he thought she should visit schools in the area in order to tell the children about her personal experiences of National Socialism in Germany. That evening a colleague who was aware of Lauber's suggestion called her and asked how she would feel about addressing 300 young people on the subject of her story, that of her parents and that of her brother. She agreed to think about it. Some days later, she delivered a three-hour talk to a large group of older school children while they sat and listened in complete silence. Rachel Dror was a natural communicator and irrepressible networker. She was already well connected within the Stuttgart teaching community, and invitations to deliver her talk to school audiences became a part of her life. She was able to devote herself to the mission more completely after her retirement from teaching in 1986. Increasingly she found herself accepting invitations to speak from schools in neighbouring cities. Often her addresses acquired a wider virtual audience through being summarised and reported in local newspapers. Her theme is mutual Christian-Jewish tolerance. She told of her life, of Jewish customs and traditions. In her school visits she tried to encourage young people to stand up against violence and contempt for the individual.

Along with her presentations, she also involved herself in Christian-Jewish and Christian-Israeli projects and was a frequent presence at the Stuttgart synagogue, giving presentation on contemporary Jewish life in Germany, and providing ad hoc guided tours.

Dror died on 14 December 2024, at the age of 103.
