= Gregory Baum =

Canadian Catholic priest and theologian (1923–2017)

Gregory Baum OC
- Born: Gerhard Albert Baum; June 20, 1923; Berlin, Weimar Republic
- Died: October 18, 2017 (aged 94); Montreal, Quebec, Canada
- Citizenship: German, Canadian
- Education: McMaster University (BA in mathematics and physics); Ohio State University (MA in mathematics); University of Fribourg (ThD)
- Occupation: Priest of the Order of St. Augustine (1947–1978)
- Known for: Holocaust theology; LGBT advocacy
- Notable work: Nostra aetate; Dignitatis humanae; Unitatis redintegratio

Ecclesiastical career
- Religion: Christianity
- Church: Roman Catholic Church
- Ordained: 1947
- Congregations served: Saint Pierre-Apôtre, Montreal

Gerhard Albert Baum OC (June 20, 1923 – October 18, 2017), better known as Gregory Baum, was a German-born Canadian priest and theologian in the Catholic Church. He became known in North America and Europe in the 1960s for his work on ecumenism, interfaith dialogue, and the relationship between the Catholic Church and Jews. In the later 1960s, he went to the New School for Social Theory in New York and became a sociologist, which led to his work on creating a dialogue between classical sociology (Marx, Tocqueville, Durkheim, Toennies, Weber, etc.) and Christian theology.

In the 1970s, he welcomed the insights of the Theology of Liberation that came from Latin America and other societies. He also became interested in the work of Karl Mannheim and developed a program of ideology critique that he hoped would eliminate the ideological or prejudicial elements in religion.

In the 1980s and 1990s, Baum continued his study into ideology critique by integrating the work of the Frankfurt School of Critical Theory. He connected the Frankfurt School's concept of "the end of innocent critique" with Liberation theology's "preferential option for the poor".

== Early life ==
Born to a Jewish mother and a Protestant father in Berlin, he moved to Canada from England as a war refugee.

He arrived by boat in Quebec in 1940 with other Germans, most of them Jewish; they were housed in refugee camps, under military control. After some transfers between Quebec, Trois-Rivières, New-Brunswick and Farnham, he was finally sent to Sherbrooke, Quebec.

== Career ==
Baum was the professor of theology and sociology at University of Saint Michael's College in the University of Toronto and, after 1986, professor of theological ethics at McGill University's Faculty of Religious Studies. In Montreal, he was associated with the Jesuit Centre justice et foi until his death. During his time at the University of St. Michael's College, Baum explored the relationship between theological and sociological thinking, as opposed to the relationship between theology and philosophy.

During the church council Vatican II he was a peritus, or theological advisor, at the Ecumenical Secretariat, the commission responsible for three conciliar documents: On Religious Liberty, On Ecumenism, and On the Church's Relation to Non-Christian Religions. He composed an early draft of the conciliar document Nostra aetate, the Declaration on the Relation of the Church with Non-Christian Religions, that was later expanded to address all the world religions. He was also among the small group of theologians who worked on the fourth and final draft. It was promulgated by Pope Paul VI on October 28, 1965.

Baum was laicized in 1974.

In particular, he urged cessation of Christian efforts to convert Jews, writing in a 1977 publication:

After Auschwitz the Christian churches no longer wish to convert the Jews. While they may not be sure of the theological grounds that dispense them from this mission, the churches have become aware that asking the Jews to become Christians is a spiritual way of blotting them out of existence and thus only reinforces the effects of the Holocaust.

From 1962 to 2004, he was the editor of The Ecumenist, a review of theology, culture and society. He continued contributing to The Ecumenist, serving as editor of one issue per year until his death. He was also a member and frequent editor of the international Catholic review Concilium. He supported women's ordination. He signed the Catholic Scholars' Declaration on Authority in the Church.

== Personal life ==
In 1946, while studying mathematics at McMaster University, a friend gave him a copy of Augustine's Confessions. Shortly after he became a Roman Catholic. In 1947 he entered the Augustinian Order and was ordained to the priesthood. In 1978, after leaving the Augustinians, he married his close friend Shirley Flynn and lived with her until her death in 2007. He remained committed to "exploring my sexuality in non-conformist ways." A strong supporter of gays and lesbians in the Church, Baum had been aware since adolescence of his own attraction to men. After moving to Montreal in 1986, he fell in love with a former priest. Baum died in hospital in Montreal on October 18, 2017, surrounded by his friends. His funeral was held at his parish church, Saint Pierre-Apôtre in Montreal.

Canadian author Michael Higgins, who first met Baum in 1968, writes "Politeness, ingenuousness, and collegiality are the personal as well as professional qualities that have defined his life and vocation no matter the setting — university, chancery, parish hall, retreat house, or activist cell."

== Publications ==
- That They May Be One, Newman Press, 1958.
- Progress and Perspective, 1962.
- Kerk en eenheid, voortgang en vooruitzichten, 1964
- Is the New Testament anti-Semitic?: A re-examination of the New Testament, 1965.
- The Future of Belief Debate (ed.), Herder & Herder, 1967.
- The Credibility of the Church Today, Herder & Herder, 1968.
- Faith and Doctrine; a Contemporary View, 1969.
- Man Becoming, Herder & Herder, 1970.
- The Infallibility Debate, 1971.
- The Jews, faith and ideology, 1973.
- The Church as Institution, 1974.
- Religion and Alienation, Paulist Press, 1975.
- Christian theology after Auschwitz, 1977.
- Truth Beyond Relativity:Karl Mannheim's Sociology of Knowledge, The Marquette Lecture, Marquette University Press, 1977.
- The Social Imperative, 1979.
- Catholics and Canadian Socialism : Political Thought in the Thirties and Forties, 1980.
- The Priority of Labour: Commentary on John Paul II's `Laborem exercens,’ Paulist Press, 1982.
- The Holocaust and Christian Theology, 1982.
- George Tyrrell and the Catholic Tradition, 1982.
- New Religious Movements, 1983.
- Ethics and Economics: Canada's Catholic Bishops on the Economic Crisis, 1984
- The Sexual Revolution, 1984.
- Theology and Society, Paulist Press, 1986.
- Liberation Theology and Marxism, 1986.
- Thomas Berry and the New Cosmology, 1987.
- Compassion and Solidarity: The Church for Others (The 1987 CBC Massey Lectures), Anansi Press, 1988.
- Sport, 1989.
- The Logic of Solidarity: Commentaries on Pope John Paul Ii's Encyclical on Social Concern, 1990.
- Compassion and Solidarity : The Church for Others, 1990.
- God and Capitalism: A Prophetic Critique of Market Economy, 1991.
- 'The Church in Quebec, Novalis, 1992.
- Essays in Critical Theology, Sheed and Ward, 1994.
- Karl Polanyi on Ethics and Economics, McGill-Queen's University Press, 1996.
- The Reconciliation of People: Challenge to the Churches, 1997.
- The Twentieth Century: A Theological Overview, 1999.
- Nationalism, Religion and Ethics, McGill-Queen's University Press, 2001.
- The Reconciliation of Peoples: Challenge to the Churches, 2002.
- Le Monothéisme : Un Dieu, trois religions, 2003.
- "Reclaiming Democracy: The Social Justice and the Political Economy of Gregory Baum and Kari Polanyi Levitt," edited by Marguerite Mendell, McGill-Queen's University Press, 2005.
- Étonnante Église, 2006.
- Signs of the Times: Religious Pluralism and Economic Injustice, Novalis, 2008.
- The Theology of Tariq Ramadan: A Catholic Perspective, University of Notre Dame Press, 2009.
- Islam et modernité: la pensée de Tariq Ramadan, 2010.
- "Truth and Relevance: Catholic Theology in French Quebec since the Quiet Revolution," McGill-Queen's University Press, 2014.
- Truth and Relevance: Catholic Theology in French Quebec since the Quiet Revolution, 2014; traduction : Vérité et pertinence : un regard sur la théologie catholique au Québec depuis la Révolution tranquille, 2014.
- "Fernand Dumont: A Sociologist Turns to Theology," McGill-Queen's University Press, 2015.
- "The Oil Has Not Run Dry: The Story of My Theological Pathway, McGill-Queen's University Press, 2016.
- A second edition of his seminal 1975 book, Religion and Alienation was republished by Novalis in 2006.

== Honours ==
He holds honorary doctorates from Huron University College, London, Ontario; St. Francis Xavier University, Antigonish, N.S; Ohio Wesleyan University, Delaware, Ohio; Lafayette College, Easton, Pa.; Wilfrid Laurier University, Waterloo, Ontario; McMaster University, Hamilton, Ontario; Concordia University, Montreal, Quebec, and St. Jerome's University, Waterloo, Ontario.

In 1990, he was made an Officer of the Order of Canada in recognition of being "a guide and inspiration to generations of students of many different faiths and backgrounds".

== See also ==
- Bruno Hussar — Nostra aetate co-author
- John M. Oesterreicher — Nostra aetate co-author
