= Marc H. Tanenbaum =

American activist and rabbi (1925–1992)

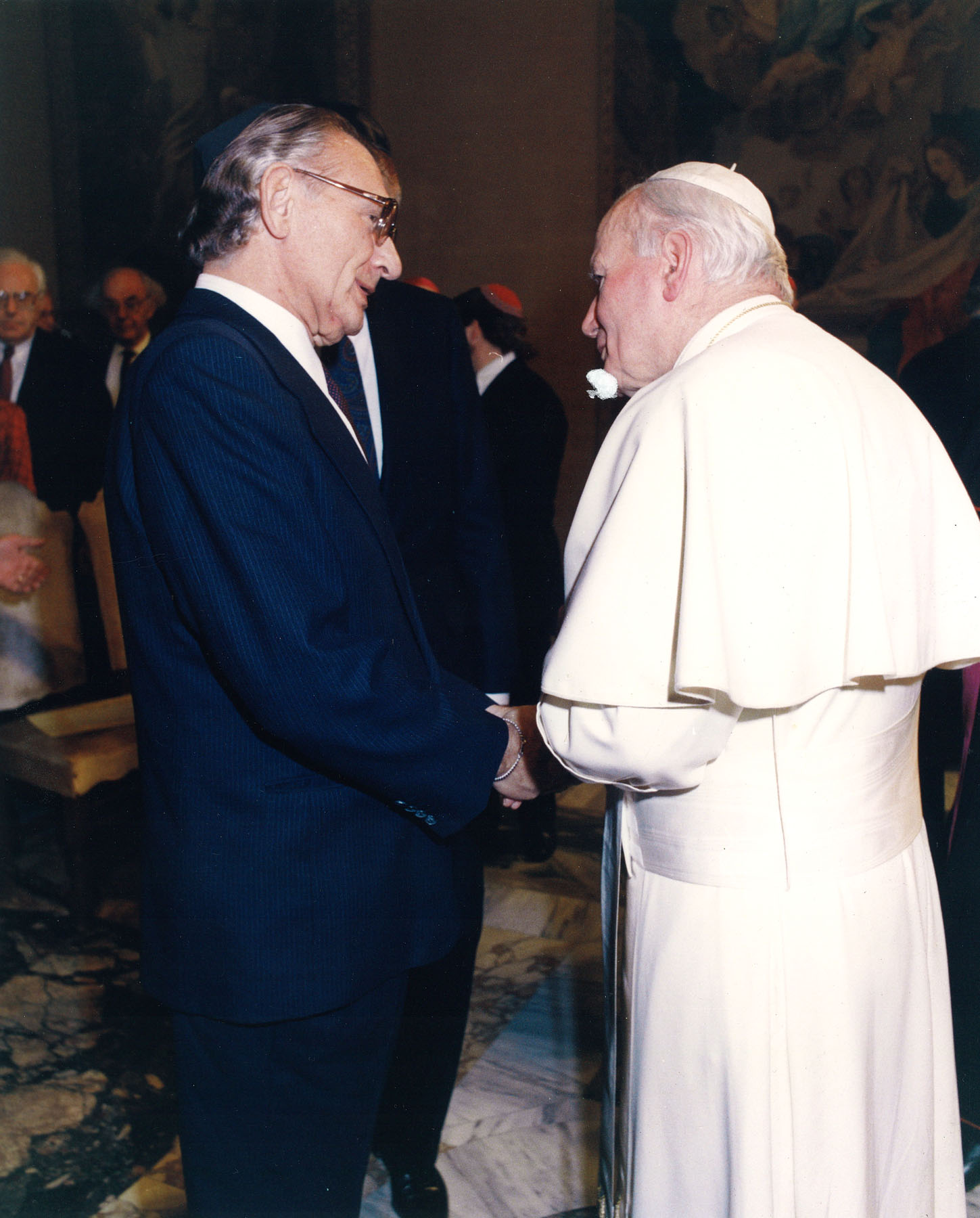
- Tanenbaum and Pope John Paul II in 1990

Personal life
- Born: October 13, 1925 Baltimore, Maryland
- Died: July 3, 1992 (aged 66)
- Children: 4
- Education: Yeshiva University, Jewish Theological Seminary
- Occupation: Human rights and social justice activist who worked on Christian-Jewish relations

Religious life
- Religion: Judaism
- Denomination: Conservative

Jewish leader
- Residence: New York City
- Semikhah: 1950

Marc H. Tanenbaum (October 13, 1925 – July 3, 1992) was an American rabbi who advocated on behalf of human rights and social justice. He was known for building bridges with other faith communities to advance mutual understanding and co-operation and to eliminate entrenched stereotypes, particularly ones rooted in religious teachings.

He was an advocate during the Second Vatican Council (1962–1965) on behalf of what eventually emerged as Nostra aetate. The landmark document overturned a long tradition of hostility toward Jews and Judaism, including the charge that the Jews were responsible for the death of Jesus; affirmed the Jewish roots of Christianity; established a new policy of outreach in dialogue to Jews; and set out a new course for Catholic-Jewish relations.

Tanenbaum was dubbed "the human rights rabbi" for his work on behalf of Vietnamese boat people and Cambodian refugees. He also helped to organize humanitarian relief for victims of the Nigerian Civil War.

== Early life ==
The son of poor Orthodox Jewish Polish immigrants, Tanenbaum grew up in Baltimore. He excelled in school, graduating with a scholarship to attend Yeshiva University, in New York City. He pursued both premedical rabbinical studies. Upon graduating from Yeshiva University, he was accepted into medical school, but after only one day of classes, he realized that medicine was not the path for him.

Always interested in writing, both creative and journalistic, he found work at a weekly newsletter. A chance encounter with a former classmate, Harold M. Schulweis, who later became a distinguished rabbi and author, led to Tanenbaum to apply successfully to the Jewish Theological Seminary.

At the seminary, he pursued his interests in both Judaism and journalism, writing for The Eternal Light, a radio show produced by the seminary.

== Career ==
After his ordination, Tanenbaum knew that he wanted to serve the Jewish community but not in what capacity. He worked in various positions as a writer and editor, and for a time, he was the religion writer for Time magazine. In 1952, he became director of the Synagogue Council of America, which was formed to represent the combined voices of Orthodox, Conservative, and Reform Judaism in the United States for policy and intergroup relations. There, he forged contacts with Christian leaders, including televangelists and Greek Orthodox primates. Notably befriending Reverend Martin Luther King Jr., he became involved in national public affairs.

He served as the vice president of the White House Conference on Children and Youth, where he invited Rabbi Abraham Joshua Heschel to deliver a major paper. The intersection of religion and public policy had a particular appeal for Tanenbaum, who saw it as a fertile field for interreligious co-operation. He believed that Jews needed to take an active role in public life to prevent marginalization and to counter anti-Semitism.

In 1983, Tanenbaum became director of International Affairs of the American Jewish Committee (AJC), where he focused on issues of human rights and humanitarian work.

During his career as director of first Interreligious and then International Affairs at the AJC, Tanenbaum won public recognition. The magazine Newsweek dubbed him "the American Jewish community's foremost apostle to the gentiles," and the New York Magazine called him "the foremost Jewish ecumenical leader in the world today." In a poll of newspaper editors ranking the ten most respected and influential religious leaders in America, he came in fourth.

He served on the boards of various institutions, including the American Jewish World Service, the International Rescue Committee, the Overseas Development Council, the United Nations Association, the National Peace Academy, the A. Philip Randolph Institute, and Covenant House. He was the founder and chairman of the National Interreligious Task Force on Soviet Jewry. Under the directorship of Ann Gillen, it vigorously pursued the cause of the Soviet Union's oppressed Jews and Christians.

He was awarded 15 honorary degrees and was honored by the International Council of Christians and Jews and the New York Board of Rabbis.

Tanenbaum was known for his weekly radio broadcasts that addressed current events with commentary. He also wrote editorials and articles directed to the Jewish community, upholding the value of interreligious dialogue.

Tanenbaum’s first marriage in 1955 to Helga Weiss ended in divorce in 1977. They had two daughters, Adina and Susan, and a son, Michael. He was married in 1982 to Dr. Georgette Bennett, an author, broadcast journalist, criminologist, and business consultant.

== Death ==
He died in 1992 of heart failure, at the age of 66, seven weeks before the birth of his son Joshua-Marc Tanenbaum. In 1993, his widow Dr. Bennett launched the Rabbi Marc H. Tanenbaum Foundation, which now operates as the Tanenbaum Center for Interreligious Understanding.

== Education ==
- City High School, Baltimore (class of 1940)
- Talmudical Academy, Baltimore (class of 1944)
- Yeshiva University (1948)
- Jewish Theological Seminary (ordained 1950)

== Board memberships ==
- American Jewish Committee – Director of International Relations Department
- American Jewish World Service – Board of Directors
- International Rescue Committee – Board of Directors

== Key writings ==
- Paths to Agape (1962)
- What is a Jew? (1963)
- Pope John XXIII: "One of the Righteous Among the Peoples of the Earth" (1963)
- An Interfaith Reexamination of Christian-Jewish Relations
- The American Negro: Myths and Realities
- The Role of the Church and Synagogue in Social Action
- Vatican II: An Interfaith Appraisal: A Jewish Viewpoint
- A Jewish Reaction to Catholic Positions in Vatican II
- Israel's Hour of Need and the Jewish-Christian Dialogue
- The Meaning of Israel: A Jewish View
- Jewish-Christian Relations:Issues and Prospects
- A Survey and Evaluation of Christian-Jewish Relationships Since Vatican Council II
- Statement on"Jerusalem" Before the Near East Subcommittee of the House Foreign Affairs Committee
- Do You Know What Hurts Me?
- Judaism, Christianity, and Islam: Discovery of Mutual Harmonies (February 16, 1972)
- Some Issues Raised by Forthcoming Evangelism Campaigns: A Background Memorandum (June 1972)
- Judaism, Ecumenism and Pluralism
- Holy Year 1975 and Its Origins in the Jewish Jubilee Year
- The Maccabees and Martyrdom: Their Meaning for Today
- Major Issues in the Jewish-Christian Situation Today
- The Moral Legacy of Martin Luther King Jr.(January 15, 1980)
- The Moral Majority: Threat or Challenge?
- Address on the Seventy-fifth Anniversary of the American Jewish Committee (May 15, 1981)
- Luther and the Jews: From the Past, A Present Challenge
- The Role of the Passion Play in Fostering Anti-Semitism Throughout History
- Jewish-Christian Relations: Heschel and Vatican Council II (February 21, 1983)
- The Concept of the Human Being in Jewish Thought: Some Ethical Implications
- On Black-Jewish Relations (March 11, 1987)
- Response on Receiving "Interfaith Award" of the International Council of Jews (May 11, 1988)
- Jewish-Catholic Relations: Achievements and Unfinished Agenda (November 27–30, 1988)
- No One Has the Right to Turn Auschwitz into a Christian Holy Place

== Television consulting ==
- "A.D." – The T.V. Mini-Series
- "Civiltà Cattolica" Returns to Anti-Zionist Hatred
- "Din Mishpat" – Dispute with the Lord
- Holocaust series and the Soul of Germany
- "Jesus of Nazareth"
