= Karl Thieme =

German historian and political scientist

Karl Otto Thieme (May 25, 1902—July 26, 1963) was a German historian and political scientist. Thieme converted to the Catholic Church from Lutheranism and was part of an international intellectual network, along with figures such as Waldemar Gurian and John M. Oesterreicher (both converts from Judaism), who initially argued against anti-Jewish sentiment and for Jewish conversion to Christianity. After the Second World War, he was a pioneer in Catholic-Jewish interfaith dialogue through his work at Gertrud Luckner's Freiburger Rundbrief and numerous personal correspondencies. Although Thieme died before the end of the Second Vatican Council, his activities, along with "his intellectual sparring partner" Oesterreicher, paved the way for Nostra aetate (Declaration on the Relation of the Church with Non-Christian Religions).

== Biography ==
=== Early life and background ===
Karl Otto Thieme was born in Leipzig as the son of Karl Thieme Senior, an ethnic German Lutheran Protestant theologian, who taught at the University of Leipzig. His brother was the legal historian Hans Thieme. From 1912 he attended the Königin-Carola-Gymnasium, which he left in 1921 with the secondary school leaving certificate. He then studied philosophy, history and law at the universities of Leipzig, Basel and Berlin until 1926. As early as 1924 he received his doctorate under his teacher Hans Driesch on the subject of Schopenhauer's metaphysics in its relationship to the Kantian transcendental philosophy.

From 1927 Karl Thieme was a lecturer at the Berlin Deutsche Hochschule für Politik, following his teacher Hermann Heller there. Thieme, the son of a Lutheran family from Dresden, identified as a Christian throughout his life including during his youth. Thieme became involved in left-wing politics and joined the Social Democratic Party of Germany in 1924. This shocked some of his friends, as at the time, the Social Democratic Party of Germany identified as Marxist (though democratic) and was openly anti-religious in its materials. Thieme continued to pronounce his religious beliefs, however, editing the Religiöse Besinning publication which promoted ecumenism between Protestants and Catholics (something then condemned by the Vatican).

From 1931 to 1933 he was professor of history and civics at the Pedagogical Academy in Elbing. In the last years of the Weimar Republic, he briefly flirted with conservative revolution and "third positionist" politics, including Otto Strasser (Strasserism), the Neue Blätter für den Sozialismus (Social Democrats who were on the right of the party) and the Catholic Ring Movement of Heinrich Brüning. Following Adolf Hitler's rise to power and the establishment of National Socialism as the ruling regime in Germany, Thieme was due to give an address at a Social Democratic Party event in Elbing celebrating Karl Marx on the fiftieth anniversary of his death, on March 14, 1933. However, the evet was cancelled as the Gestapo rounded up Marxist politicians in the city, a week later Thieme himself was placed in protective custody. Thieme was informed that he no longer had a job at the academy as Social Democrats were banned from holding state positions.

=== The Church and the Jews ===
At first, Thieme, looking to protect his family, considered joining Der Stahlhelm, so that he would avoid political persecution. However, his wife forbade this. By July 1933, while visiting Berlin, Thieme heard first hand accounts of the Köpenick's week of bloodshed; violence carried out by the Sturmabteilung (SA), where at least 21 people, including Thieme's fellow Social Democrats, were killed (many more were tortured). From this point on, he went into open opposition to the National Socialist regime. By this time, many of the Protestant Landeskirche were bending to the Hitler government and adopting the "Aryan paragraph"; much to the dismay of Thieme (converts of Jewish descent were banned from holding positions within these Protestant churches). Controlling and arbitrarily changing the doctrines of the Catholic Church would prove more difficult for any political regime; this attracted Thieme and some German Protestants to it at the time (while not holding Jews in high regard, the Catholic Church did not exclude on the basis of racial origin, converts from taking part in the life of the Church). Thieme entered the Catholic Church on January 30, 1934, and around forty Protestant pastors from the "Thieme circle" followed. German officials lodged a complaint to Rome about the Thieme circle and Alfred Rosenberg, the leading NSDAP ideologue and author of The Myth of the Twentieth Century, condemned Thieme for his "treasonous pilgrimage to Rome."

In 1935, with the attention of the political authorities now directly on him and political violence a viable threat, Thieme elected to leave Germany and emigrated to Switzerland. While in Switzerland, Thieme was in contact with other political exiles on the left who had fled Germany, in particular Walter Benjamin and Theodore Adorno of the Frankfurt School. Thieme sent Benjamin a copy of his 1934 work, Old Verities: A History of the Personal Formation of the West. Benjamin viewed Thieme's work positively, as it reminded him of the theology of his old German Protestant friend, Florens Christian Rang; it chimed well with Benjamin's view that Marxism is a secularisation of "Judeo-Christian messianism." The correspondence between the two men lasted a number of years: in 1936, during the Berlin Olympics, Thieme helped Benjamin to publish the work German People (under the pseudonym "Detlef Holz") through Vita Nova in Lucerne, which attacked the spirit of the National Socialist-era. Here from Switzerland, together with Waldemar Gurian (a Russian-Jewish convert to Catholicism) and edited by John M. Oesterreicher (an Austrian-Jewish convert to Catholicism), Thieme wrote a memorandum in 1937 entitled "The Church of Christ and the Jewish Question", which called on all Christians, but especially the Pope and the Roman Curia, to oppose contemporary anti-Jewish sentiment and to take a public position on the movement against the Jews in Germany. Since 1943 he was entitled to live in Läufelfingen, Basel-Landschaft.

=== Interfaith in the post-war years ===
From 1947 he was visiting professor, from 1953 full professor for European history, philosophy and German studies at the foreign and interpreting institute of the University of Mainz in Germersheim.

In 1950, Thieme changed his position in regards to the Christian mission to the Jews, arguing instead that the adherents of Rabbinic Judaism were pleasing to God as Jews and need not convert (contrary to the traditional Christian teaching that is sometimes referred to as supersessionism and specifically the Catholic concept of Extra Ecclesiam nulla salus). (Note: Even while Thieme strongly advocated for the conversion of the Jews, he was explicitly Judeophile in his views. Pushing back against the "German Christians" movement within the German Evangelical Church, in an unanswered letter sent to Pope Pius XI upon the entry of the "Thieme circle" into the Catholic Church, he said in the letter that Jesus Christ had “loved his Jewish people, even if unbaptized, with burning heart, as we love our own.”) As an attempt to justify this theologically, Thieme attempted to radically reinterpret a passage in St. Paul the Apostle's Letter to the Romans. He spread these ideas through his work as co-editor of the Freiburger Rundbrief, a publication associated with Gertrud Luckner (an Anglo-German convert to Catholicism from Quakerism who was part of the German resistance and had spent time in the Ravensbrück concentration camp) which he had co-edited since 1948. The publication was founded to "oppose anti-semitism within Christianity" and was spread throughout German-speaking Catholic and Protestant parishes. Although their views were unpopular and viewed as radical, it had some supporters such as Thieme's longtime intellectual partner Oesterreicher, by then at Seton Hall University in the United States and Paul Démann in France (a Hungarian-Jewish convert to Catholicism from the Congregation of Our Lady of Sion, who had participated in the Seelisberg Conference associated with Jules Isaac).

Thieme also maintained a close correspondence with a number of Jewish figures during this time, including Martin Buber, Ernst Ehrlich (future Director of B'nai B'rith in Europe, also based in Switzerland), as well as the Rabbis of Bern and Geneva, amongst others. Thieme maintained contacts with Christian-Jewish societies and was a consultant for religious matters at the German Coordination Council of Societies for Christian-Jewish Cooperation.

From 1954 to 1963 he was director of the foreign and interpreting institute, then he was deputy director. Although Oesterreicher and Thieme mainted a correspondence after the war, they had a falling out in 1960, with Thieme under the impression that Oesterreicher viewed him as un-Orthodox (Oesterreicher held out some hope for Jewish conversion to Christianity into the 1960s). Despite this and Thieme dying before reconciling with his intellectual sparing-partner, Oesterreicher later adopted the same views as Thieme and working with Cardinal Augustin Bea at the Second Vatican Council had a significant influence on drafting the document Nostra aetate (Declaration on the Relation of the Church with Non-Christian Religions). According to John Connelly, Oesterreicher borrowed directly Thieme's vision of the end times which he had formulated for an ecumenical congress in Evanston in 1954, into the text of Nostra aetate (Thieme had drawn from Karl Barth from this and Barth had drawn it from Moses Maimonides). Thieme died in Basel, Switzerland in 1963. A Karl Thieme archive has existed in the Jewish National Library in Jerusalem since 1980.

== Works ==
- Das alte Wahre. Eine Bildungsgeschichte des Abendlandes. Leipzig 1934.
- Christliche Bildung in dieser Zeit, Verlagsanstalt Benziger, Einsiedeln, 1935
- Beiträge zur Geschichte des Dolmetschens (with Edgar Glässer and Alfred Hermann), München 1956
- Biblische Religion heute. Heidelberg 1960
- Dreitausend Jahre Judentum. Quellen und Darstellungen zur jüdischen Geschichte, Paderborn 1960
- (Editor): Judenfeindschaft. Darstellung und Analysen. Fischer Bücherei des Wissens, Frankfurt am Main 1963.

== See also ==
- Joseph Wirth
