= Město Libavá =

- Municipality
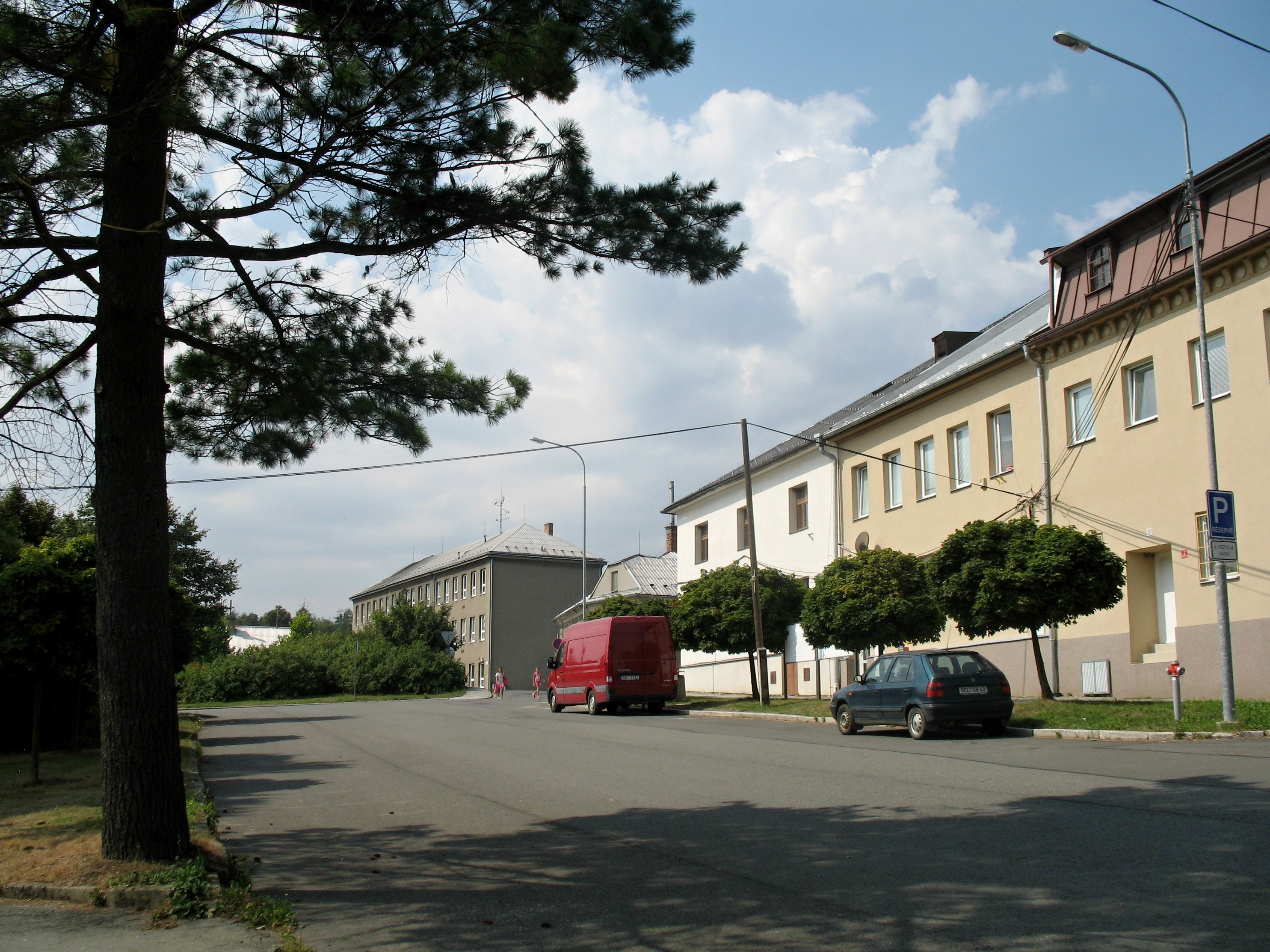
- Square in Město Libavá

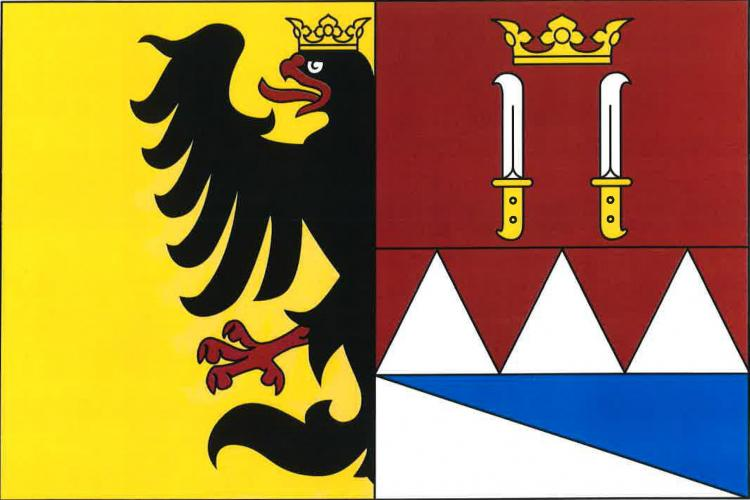
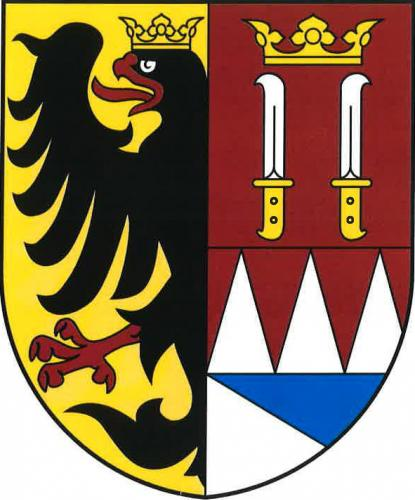
- Flag Coat of arms

- Location in the Czech Republic
- Coordinates: 49°43′19″N 17°31′4″E
- Country: Czech Republic
- Region: Olomouc
- District: Olomouc
- First mentioned: 1301

Area
  - Total: 29.33 km^{2} (11.32 sq mi)
- Elevation: 530 m (1,740 ft)

Population (2026-01-01)
  - Total: 540
  - Density: 18/km^{2} (48/sq mi)
- Time zone: UTC+1 (CET)
  - Summer (DST): UTC+2 (CEST)
- Postal code: 783 07
- Website: www.mesto-libava.eu

Město Libavá (German: Liebau, Stadt Liebau) is a municipality and village in Olomouc District in the Olomouc Region of the Czech Republic. It has about 500 inhabitants.

== Administrative division ==
Město Libavá consists of two municipal parts (in brackets population according to the 2021 census):

- Město Libavá (441)
- Heroltovice (88)

== Geography ==
Město Libavá is located about 23 kilometres (14 mi) northeast of Olomouc. It lies in the Nízký Jeseník range. The highest point is at 722 m (2,369 ft) above sea level. The stream Libavský potok flows through the municipality.

== History ==
The first written mention of Město Libavá is from 1301, when it was a property of the Olomouc bishopric.

Město Libavá became a separate municipality on 1 January 2016 by reduction of Libavá Military Training Area.

== Demographics ==
Historical population

Year	Pop.	±%
1869	3,048	—
1880	3,240	+6.3%
1890	3,348	+3.3%
1900	3,422	+2.2%
1910	3,267	−4.5%

Year	Pop.	±%
1921	3,111	−4.8%
1930	2,950	−5.2%
1950	5,063	+71.6%
1961	574	−88.7%
1970	645	+12.4%

Year	Pop.	±%
1980	465	−27.9%
1991	503	+8.2%
2001	711	+41.4%
2011	536	−24.6%
2021	529	−1.3%

Source: Censuses

== Transport ==
There are no railways or major roads passing through the municipality.

== Sights ==
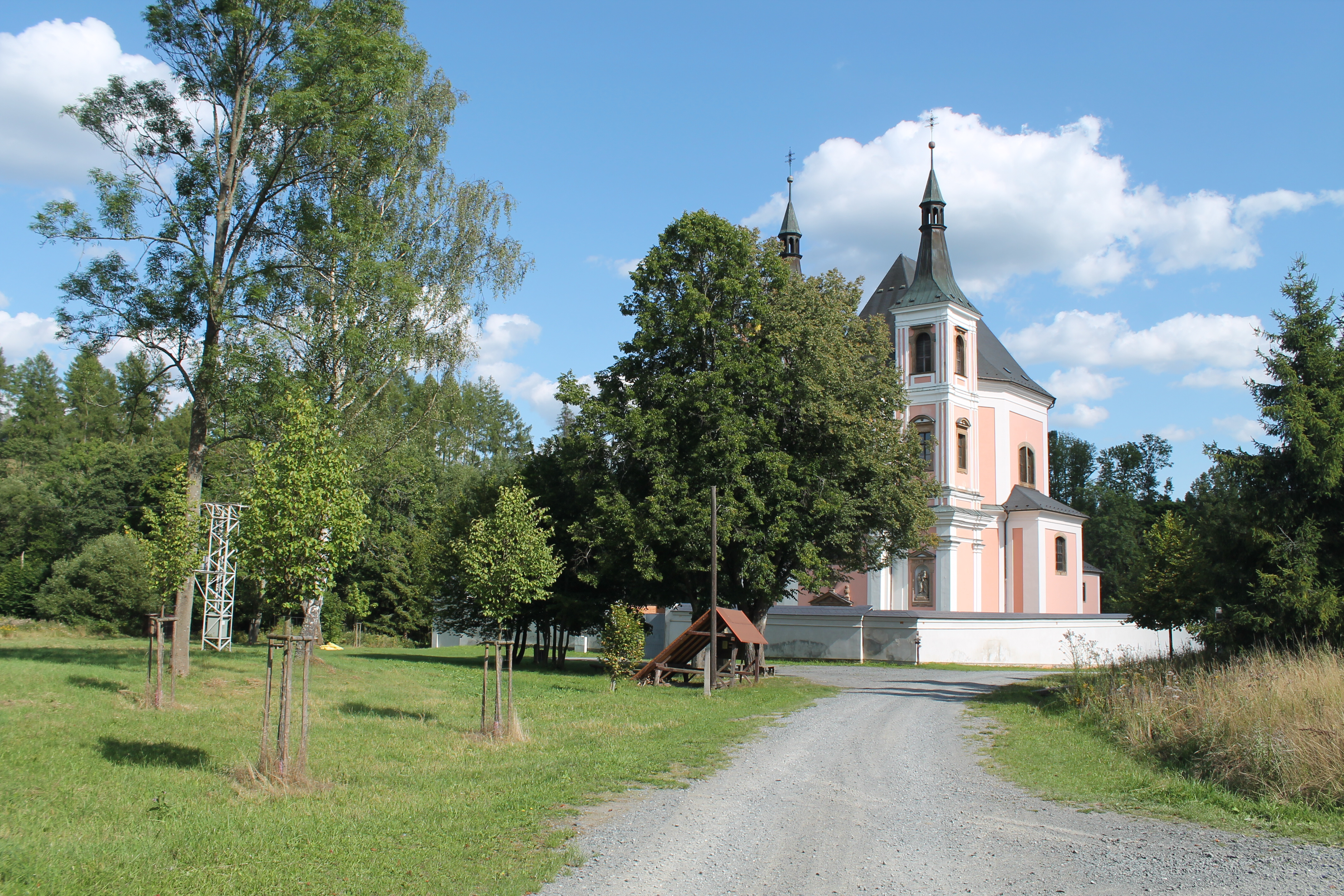
Church of Saints James the Great and Anne

The main landmark of Město Libavá is the Church of the Exaltation of the Holy Cross. It was built in the Baroque style in the 1660s. Since 2016, it has been owned by the municipality and used for cultural and social purposes.

The Church of Saints James the Great and Anne is located in a remote place called Stará Voda, where there was once a large pilgrimage complex with a Dominican monastery. The church was built in the Baroque style in 1681–1689, on the site of two old pilgrimage chapels.

A rare technical monument is a Dutch-type windmill from the second half of the 19th century.

== Notable people ==
- John M. Oesterreicher (1904–1993), Austrian-American Catholic theologian
