= John M. Oesterreicher =

Catholic theologian (1904–1993)

- Born: Johannes Oesterreicher; 2 February 1904; Město Libavá, Moravia, Austria-Hungary
- Died: 18 April 1993 (aged 89); Livingston, New Jersey, United States
- Citizenship: Austrian, American
- Occupation: Theologian at Seton Hall University
- Known for: Jewish-Catholic relations
- Notable work: Nostra aetate

Monsignor John Maria Oesterreicher (2 February 1904 – 18 April 1993), born Johannes Oesterreicher, was a Catholic theologian and a leading advocate of Jewish–Catholic reconciliation. He was one of the architects of Nostra aetate or "In Our Age," a declaration which was issued by the Second Vatican Council in 1965 and which repudiated antisemitism.

== Biography ==
Oesterreicher was born to a Jewish family in Město Libavá (Stadt Liebau) in Moravia (then part of Austria and now the Czech Republic). He was a convert to Catholicism and became a priest in 1927. He served as a chaplain in Gloggnitz, and there he founded the local Scout group and served at its chaplain.

He was an anti-Nazi activist in the 1930s. In 1934 he founded the newspaper Die Erfüllung (The Fruition) to improve relations between Jews and Christians and to fight against antisemitism. Together with Georg Bichlmair SJ, he founded the Pauluswerk in Vienna. The Pauluswerk was a community for converts from Judaism to Roman Catholicism and prayed for Christianization of Jews. Oesterreicher edited a document authored by Waldemar Gurian (a Russian-Jewish convert to Catholicism) and Karl Thieme (a German-Lutheran convert to Catholicism) in 1937 entitled "The Church of Christ and the Jewish Question", which called on all Christians, but especially the Pope and the Roman Curia, to oppose contemporary anti-Jewish sentiment and to take a public position on the movement against the Jews in Germany. He would maintain a close intellectual partnership with Thieme for many years.

After the broadcast of Austrian Chancellor Kurt Schuschnigg's resignation on 11 March 1938, Österreicher went to Schuschnigg's office and burned all the correspondence, because he was aware that the Gestapo would search his office and home. Österreicher also burned all of his own correspondence as well as his books, in order to protect citizens of Jewish origin. His parents, Nathan and Ida Oesterreicher, later died in Theresienstadt and Auschwitz. He fled Austria five weeks after the March 1938 Anschluss, or annexation of Austria. Based initially in Paris, he condemned the Nazis in weekly broadcasts and writings. He fled to the U.S. after the German invasion of France in 1940.

Oesterreicher founded the Institute of Judaeo-Christian Studies at Seton Hall University in 1953. He was appointed a Papal Chamberlain, with the title of monsignor, in 1961. In the 1960s, he was one of fifteen priests who petitioned the Vatican to take up the issue of antisemitism. Oesterreicher is probably best known for his involvement in drafting Nostra aetate. The statement rejected antisemitism and repudiated the notion that Jews were responsible for the persecution and death of Jesus Christ. It stated that even though some Jewish authorities and those who followed them called for Jesus' death, the blame for this cannot be laid at the door of all those Jews present at that time, nor can the Jews in our time be held guilty.

The statement thus repudiated the historic charge of deicide, which is a basis of antisemitism. It stated that "the Jews should not be presented as rejected or accursed by God." Oesterreicher was strongly pro-Israel and advocated improved relations between Catholics and the Jewish state. However, he was not always a supporter of Israeli government policies. He was the author of several books and numerous scholarly articles. His books include The New Encounter Between Christians and Jews; Racism, Anti-Semitism, Anti-Christianism; and God at Auschwitz?.

He lived near the campus of Seton Hall University in South Orange, New Jersey, and he died on 18 April 1993 at Saint Barnabas Medical Center in Livingston, New Jersey, aged 89.

== Quote ==
- Nobody says anything against the Egyptian authorities for oppressing the Coptic Christians. No one protested vehemently against the forced closing of St. Joseph's College years ago in Iraq, nor against the laws in Jordan prior to 1967 which prohibited Christians from acquiring new property. If Israel did any of these things, everyone would cry bloody murder, from the authorities in Rome to Catholics all over the world... This is prejudice. (Monsignor John M. Oesterreicher, quoted by James C. O'Neill, Our Sunday Visitor, 10 July 1983)

== See also ==
- Gregory Baum — Nostra aetate co-author
- Bruno Hussar — Nostra aetate co-author
