= Jean-Fleury Baudrand =

Jean-Fleury Baudrand (or Baudran), O.M.I. (9 March 1811 – 1 October 1853), was a French Roman Catholic priest and missionary who served in North America, where he died.

== Early life ==
Baudrand was born in the Department of Vienne, the son of Jean-Fleury Baudrand, a farmer, and Madelaine Faure. There is no record of Baudrand’s childhood or education. He was ordained a priest at Grenoble on 16 July 1837 by Philibert de Bruillard, Bishop of Grenoble. He was received into the novitiate of the Missionary Oblates of Mary Immaculate, Calvary House (French: Maison du Calvaire) in Marseille, on the following 31 October. In 1841 the Oblates accepted the invitation of Bishop Ignace Bourget to send some priests to the Diocese of Montreal. Baudrand volunteered and he arrived in Montreal on 2 December 1841, along with five other Oblates from Marseille.

== Canada ==
Baudrand was immediately assigned by Bourget as the pastor of Mont-Saint-Hilaire. In August 1842 he moved to the Oblates’ new house at Longueuil, where he remained nearly four years. He spent some of his time preaching retreats in the parishes, convents, and colleges of the Montreal region; in addition he worked hard to establish temperance societies and the Daughters of Mary Immaculate, a community of pious women. From 1843 to 1845 he ministered in the Eastern Townships, traveling around an immense territory whose principal centers were Granby, Stanbridge, Dunham, and Stanstead. He stayed at Bytown (now Ottawa) (1846-1847) to help his colleagues who were wrestling with a typhus epidemic.

Baudrand returned to Longueuil the following year and served as superior of the house for the next two years. When the Oblates gave up their residence in 1850, he went to the Maison Saint-Pierre-Apôtre in Montreal East, a working-class suburb of Montreal, initially serving as the Superior of the community. In addition to undertaking ministry in the chapel, which was open to the public, and preaching, he supervised the construction of the Church of Saint-Pierre-Apôtre attached to their residence, one of the tallest structures of its day. Enjoying Bourget’s confidence, he accompanied the bishop to the first Provincial Council of the Ecclesiastical Province of Quebec in 1851 as a peritus (expert in theology).

== United States ==
A scholar with a good grasp of English and a man of high principle, Baudrand was sent as a missionary to Galveston, Texas, in April 1853. On his arrival in May, he was chosen superior of the future college at Brownsville and he supervised the construction of its buildings, which were completed under his successor, the Rev. Julien Baudre, O.M.I., in 1865.

In April 1853 Baudrand was sent from Canada to Galveston, Texas, in the United States. Upon his arrival there the following month, he was appointed as Superior of the future St. Joseph Academy at Brownsville. Not long after his arrival in Galveston, however, there was an outbreak of yellow fever the local doctor advised him to leave the area where the epidemic was raging, but he refused, being determined to remain at his post. He died three days after developing the illness, one of six priests to die nursing other victims of the epidemic.

Baudrand's body was buried near the entrance to St. Mary Cathedral Basilica there, where his and that of the others is honored by a large marble monument.

Baudrand is remembered as a conscientious and committed priest. He, and many other Oblate Fathers, added positively to the North American missions of that time.

== External sources ==
Bernardo Doyon, The Cavalry of Christ on the Rio Grande: a historical study of the Oblate Missions in Texas and Mexico, 1849–1883 (Milwaukee, Wis., 1956), 39–40, 156–57, 236.
