= Church of Saint-Pierre-Apôtre (Montreal) =

Coordinates: 45.5185°N 73.5532°W

Church of St. Peter the Apostle
- Église Saint-Pierre-Apôtre
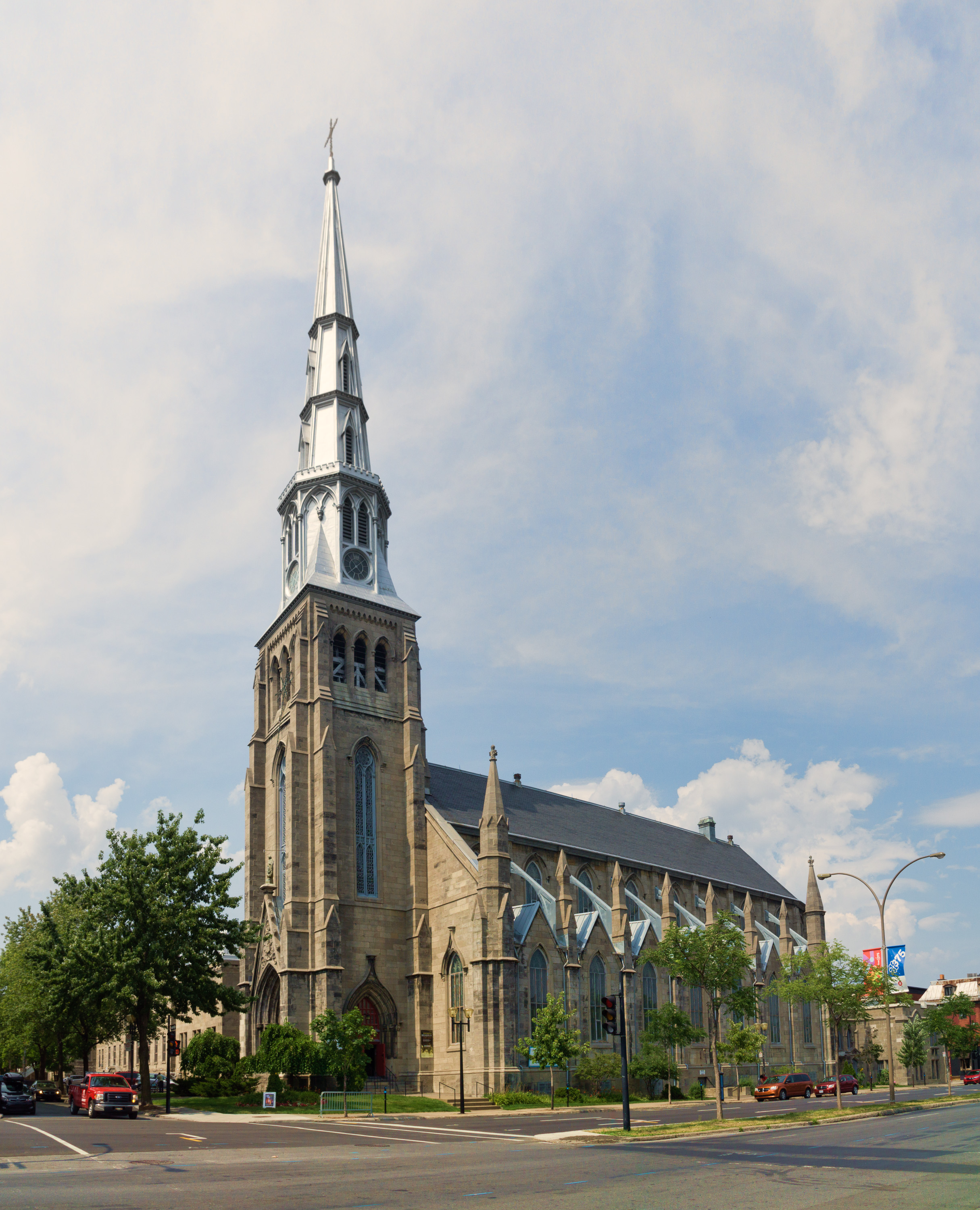
- Church of St. Peter the Apostle
- Location: 120, rue de la Visitation; Montreal, Quebec; H2L 3B5
- Denomination: Catholic Church

Architecture
- Heritage designation: Registered historical site
- Designated: 5 October 1977
- Architect: Victor Bourgeau
- Architectural type: Neogothic
- Groundbreaking: 1851
- Completed: 1853

Administration
- Archdiocese: Montreal

The Church of St. Peter the Apostle (French: Église Saint-Pierre-Apôtre) is a Canadian Roman Catholic parish church, located between Boulevard René Lévesque and Rue Sainte-Catherine East, in the Village neighbourhood of Montreal, Quebec, Canada. It has been designated a Historic Place of Canada.

== History ==
Pierre Beaudry (1774–1848) (after whom the Beaudry Métro station is named) was the owner of a large farm in the suburbs of Montreal, who bequeathed a part of his land for the construction of a new church of the Diocese of Montreal to be named after his patron saint. In an effort to curb the power of the Society of Saint-Sulpice, who controlled all the parishes of the city, Ignace Bourget, the Bishop of Montreal, invited a community of the Missionary Oblates of Mary Immaculate from France, who arrived in December 1841. They soon took up residence on the site, then called Faubourg Québec, opening the Maison Saint-Pierre-Apôtre, in what was fast becoming a working-class neighbourhood of the city.

Construction of a church for the community and the local people was begun in 1850, under the supervision of the Superior of the community, the Rev. Father Jean-Fleury Baudrand, O.M.I. The architect was Victor Bourgeau, who was a noted ecclesiastical architect in the city, building the Basilica of Notre-Dame and St. James Cathedral in Montreal, as well as Saint-Joachim de Pointe-Claire Church in Pointe-Claire, Quebec.

View into the Chapelle de l’Espoir or Chapel of Hope in the Church of Saint-Pierre-Apôtre in Montreal

A level of rivalry existed between the Sulpician and Oblate Fathers. This was especially true when the Sulpicians established Sainte-Brigide Parish in 1878, which included Saint-Pierre-Apôtre within its territory. This ended only when Saint-Pierre was established as a parish in its own right in 1900.

Today the church holds the Chapel of Hope (French: Chapelle de l'Espoir), dedicated to the victims of AIDS, perhaps the only one of its kind in the world. Every year the church holds free organ concerts and lights up the church in rainbow colours to honour Pride. An annual mass is held in memory of victims of AIDS on the Sunday closest to World AIDS Day on December 1.

== Architecture ==
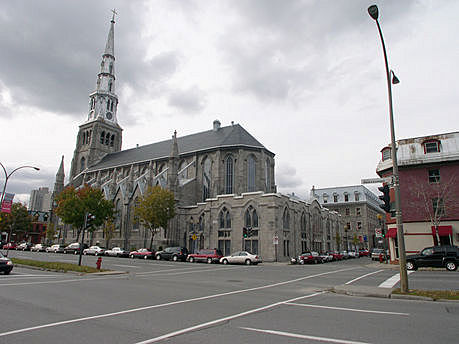
The rear view of the Roman Catholic Church of Saint-Pierre-Apôtre in Montreal

The complex to which the church belongs consists also of the rectory and sacristy, as well as a clock tower and the former choir school and elementary school.

The church has three naves, which terminate under a polygonal apse. The rectory, built 1854-1856, is of the same height as the church, built in the neoclassical style. The choir school was established in a small wooden house on the property of the Oblate community in 1859 as a private school for boys, which was replaced by the current structure in 1868. The growing need for general education led to the construction of the elementary school in 1886-1887.

The original decorations of the interior of the church might have been done by Bourgeau. Later work was done by Guido Nincheri (1885-1973). The church also boasts of an organ made by Charles Warren and enlarged by Casavant Frères (opus 316) in 1908. The stained glass windows, crafted 1853-1883, were created by the House of Champigneulle, in Bar-le-Duc, France.
