= International Council of Christians and Jews =

The International Council of Christians and Jews (ICCJ) is an umbrella organization of 38 national groups in 32 countries worldwide engaged in the Christian-Jewish dialogue.

Founded as a reaction to the Holocaust, many groups of theologians, historians and educators dedicated their efforts to seek Christian–Jewish reconciliation.

== History ==
=== Background and origins ===
The impetus for the founding of the organisation traces back to the first half of the 20th century, with two significant organisations in the Anglosphere; the American National Conference of Christians and Jews and the British Council of Christians and Jews. The American organisation had been founded by Everett R. Clinchy (a member of the Presbyterian Church in the United States) following the sectarian unrest in the 1920s, instigated by the second Ku Klux Klan of Hiram Wesley Evans and similar groups, against the run of Catholic Democrat, Al Smith, for the Presidency of the United States in 1928. Clinchy sought to create a civic American interreligious organisation arguing for religious toleration, focusing on the three main American religious groups; Protestant, Catholic and Jew. This effort had been immediately preceded in the United States by the interreligious Committee of Goodwill, founded by the ecumenical Federal Council of Churches and B'nai B'rith, a Jewish fraternal organisation.

The British organisation, however, traces its ideological origins to James Parker, an Anglican cleric who authored two major works; The Jew and His Neighbour (1929) and The Conflict of the Church and the Synagogue (1934). Parker was staunchly Judeophile, postulated a view of history which criticised Christian treatment of Jews and strongly opposed any missionary activity of Christians to convert adherents of Rabbinic Judaism (a position which he set him apart from almost all other Christians at the time). This laid the foundation for the creation of the Council of Christians and Jews primarily by William Temple, Anglican Archbishop of Canterbury and Joseph Hertz, Chief Rabbi of the United Kingdom towards the end of the Second World War in 1942. The Catholic Church was also represented by Cardinal Arthur Hinsley from 1942, but was suspicious of supposed religious indifferentism and would pull out in 1954 (for which the Church was attacked by the British media) before rejoining during the Pontificate of Pope John XXIII.

=== Oxford, Seelisberg and Fribourg ===
The First Conference of the International Council of Christians and Jews was held in Oxford in August 1946, in the aftermath of the Second World War and the Holocaust, as well as at the onset of the Cold War and was themed "Freedom, Justice, Responsibility". Some of the most prominent figures present were Geoffrey Fisher, Anglican Archbishop of Canterbury, Reinhold Niebuhr, Rufus Isaacs, Rab Butler, Rabbi Leo Baeck, Alan Paton, Hermann Maas and others. Those in attendance came from the United Kingdom, the United States, Australia, Canada, Czechoslovakia, Denmark, France, Germany, the Netherlands, the British Mandate of Palestine, South Africa, Sweden and Switzerland. Most of the participants were either Protestant or Jewish. They endeavoured for there to be "an emergency conference to deal specifically with the problem of antisemitism in Europe", which "should be convened at the earliest possible moment."

The aforementioned conference would manifest as the Seelisberg Conference of 1947, organised under the joint auspices of the American and British organisations. A French-based chapter was founded in 1948 as the Amitié judéo-chrétienne de France and a Germany-based chapter was founded in 1949 as the Deutscher Koordinierungsrat der Gesellschaften für Christlich-Jüdische Zusammenarbeit.

== Mission ==
According to the Mission Statement of the ICCJ, the group:

- promotes understanding and cooperation between Christians and Jews based on respect for each other's identity and integrity
- addresses issues of human rights and human dignity deeply enshrined in the traditions of Judaism and Christianity
- counters all forms of prejudice, intolerance, discrimination, racism and the misuse of religion for national and political domination
- affirms that in honest dialogue each person remains loyal to his or her own essential faith commitment, recognizing in the other person his or her integrity and otherness
- coordinates worldwide activities through conferences held regularly in different countries
- encourages research and education to promote interreligious understanding among students, teachers, religious leaders, and scholars
- performs outreach in regions that so far have little or no structured Jewish-Christian dialogue
- provides a platform for theological debate

== Location ==
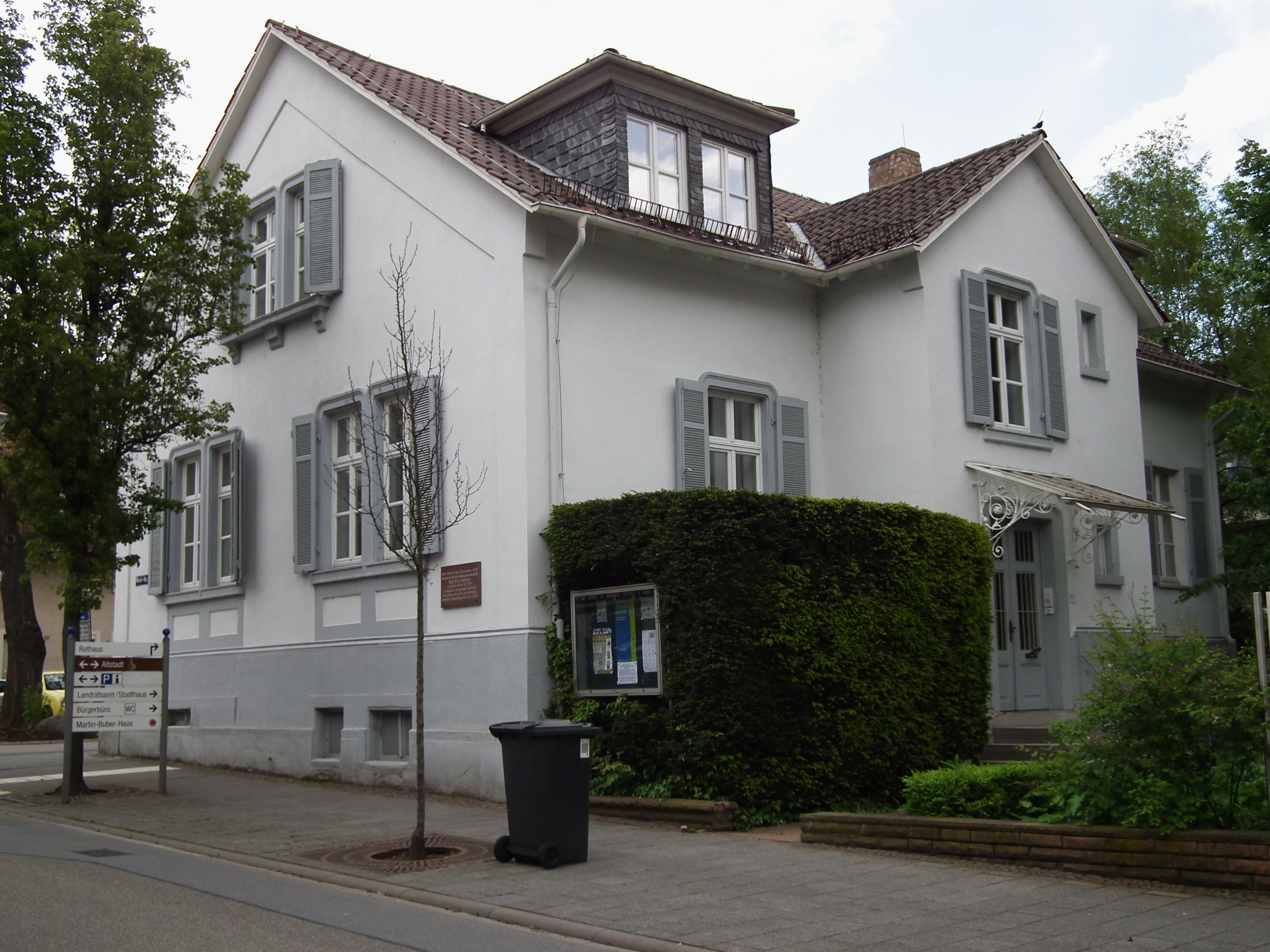
Martin Buber Haus in Heppenheim an der Bergstrasse, Germany

The international headquarters of the ICCJ is located in Heppenheim (Germany), specifically within the house where the Jewish philosopher Martin Buber lived until Nazi persecution forced him to flee Germany.

== The 10 Points of Seelisberg ==
In 1947 the ICCJ published a document after the Seelisberg Conference, giving 10 points in recommendation.

=== Recent activities ===
In 1993 ICCJ published "Jews and Christians in Search of a Common Religious Basis for Contributing Towards a Better World." This document "contains both separate Jewish perspectives and Christian perspectives concerning mutual communication and cooperation as well as a joint view of a common religious basis for Jews and Christians to work together for a better world..."

The ICCJ runs a website, Jewish-Christian Relations, "which is devoted to fostering mutual respect and understanding between Christians and Jews around the world."

In more recent years the ICCJ and its members increasingly engaged in the Abrahamic dialogue: the encounter between Jews, Christians and Muslims.

== See also ==
- Authorship of the Bible
- Center for Jewish–Christian Understanding and Cooperation
