= Deutscher Koordinierungsrat der Gesellschaften für Christlich-Jüdische Zusammenarbeit =

The Deutscher Koordinierungsrat der Gesellschaften für Christlich-Jüdische Zusammenarbeit (DKR - German Coordinating-Council for Christian-Jewish cooperation organisations) is an umbrella organisation for 81 local and regional organisations in Germany working for Christian-Jewish collaboration. It presently has around 20,000 members overall. They advocate Jewish-Christian dialogue and collaboration between Christians and Jews as well as for the study of the Holocaust. It was founded on 10 November 1949 and is based in Bad Nauheim. Its patron is ex officio the President of Germany.

It is the largest single member of the 32-nation International Council of Christians and Jews, which increasingly also looks into "Abrahamic" dialogue between Jews, Christian and Muslims to which the ICCJ can bring models based on its long experience in interfaith dialogue.

The DKR awards the annual Buber-Rosenzweig-Medal. The organisations that are represented within the DKR established the Buber-Rosenzweig Foundation in 1989, and in 1992 the foundation opened its own headquarters and conference hall in Bad Nauheim (also open to other organizers working for similar aims to that of the foundation).

== Notable members ==
- Lorenz Weinrich (1929–2025), German historian
- Karl Thieme

== See also ==
- Authorship of the Bible
