= Pacifism in the United States =

Anti-war political movement

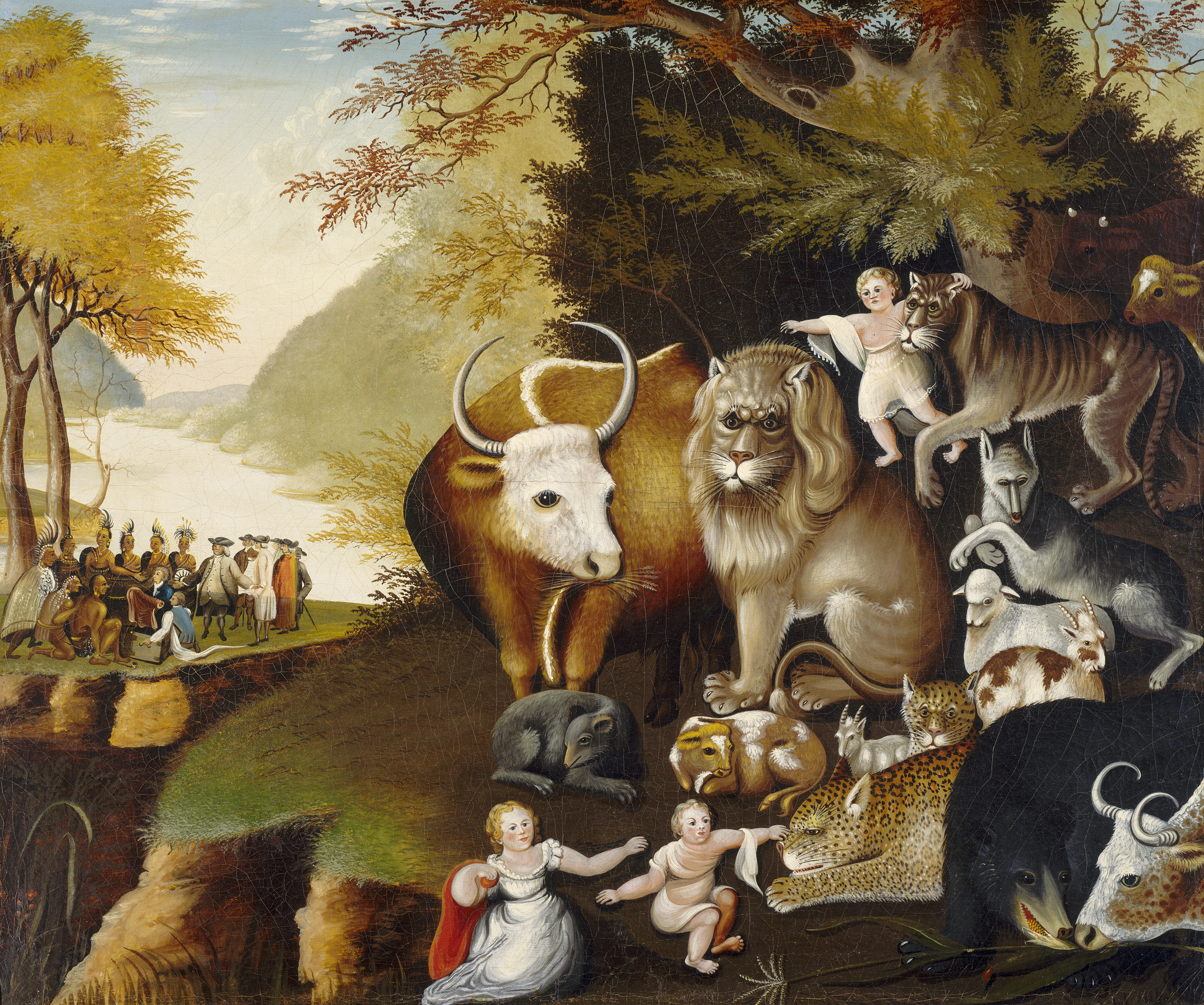
The Peaceable Kingdom (c. 1834) by Edward Hicks

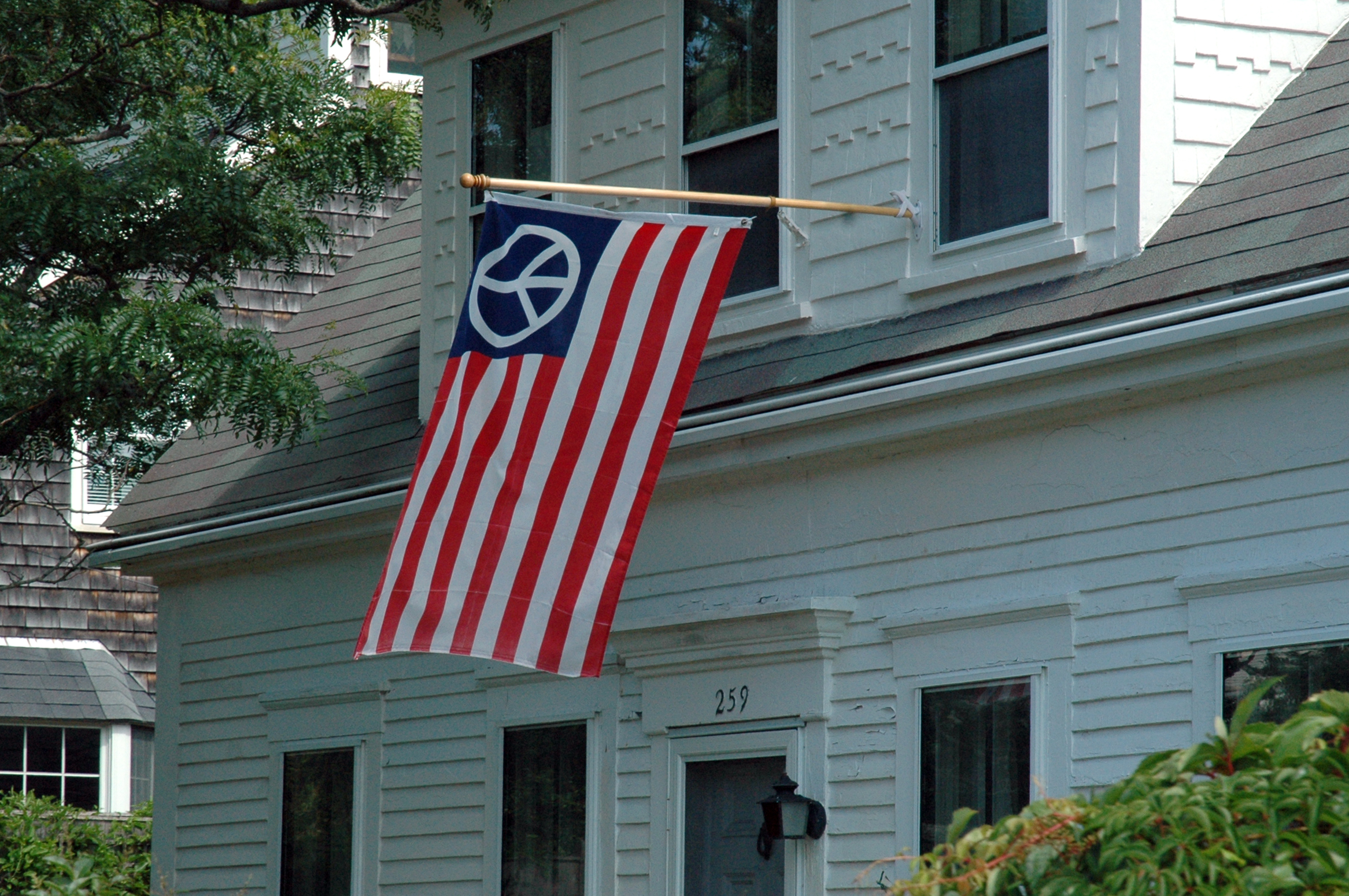
A United States peace flag in 2007

Pacifism has manifested in the United States in a variety of forms (such as peace movements), and in myriad contexts (such as opposition to the Civil War and to nuclear weapons). In general, it exists in contrast to an acceptance of the necessity of war for national defense. Pacifism in the United States has been occasionally influential in American politics, with public opposition to war impacting US politics and being championed by various organizations and activists.

In the colonial era, pacifism was a major belief among the Quakers and German sects in the Pennsylvania colony. The Quakers lost control of Pennsylvania because they were reluctant to protect settlers from Indian raids. During the American Revolutionary War (1775-1783), the pacifists kept quiet.

From 1794 to 1815, as France battled Great Britain, foreign policy was bitterly debated. Pacifism played a very small role, and there were no new pacifist organizations.

There was a small undeclared naval conflict against France in 1798-1800, and a real War of 1812 against Britain in 1812-1815. Antiwar sentiment in 1812 was strong in the northern states that bordered Canada; few people there wanted the annexation of Canada. After 1815 and the failure of the British military invasion of New Orleans. American isolationism became the dominant attitude. The US maintained a small military compared to the European great powers. It was primarily used to fight a war against Mexico and Native Americans. The other purpose was for national defense. The Civil War, saw limited Copperhead opposition to the war in the North, with flare ups of opposition such as the New York City draft riots. After the Civil War the US was a minor military power in comparison to the European great powers. The emerging American realism movement, rejected war and depicted it as cruel and useless, this as opposed to the Romantic movement which idolized war as heroic. Authors such as Walt Whitman, whose early writing displayed certain optimism at war began to depict war more negatively. During World War I early opposition to entering the European war was the dominant position, with Woodrow Wilson's campaign in 1916 using the slogan "He kept us out of the war." In 1917 the US joined World War I on the side of the Britain, France and Italy. After World War I, pacifism in the US grew more organized, with defined ideological stances. The lost generation of veterans endured through the trenches of the war, embraced a mild pacifism. This was further entrenched by antiwar authors such as John Dos Passos and Ernest Hemingway.

The interwar years saw the US avoid the world stage, as economic protectionism, and unregulated capitalism became the dominant economic forces. During the Great Depression in the United States opposition to war was a major force. Bitter debates took place in 1939-1941 about presidential proposals to help the United Kingdom in its war against Nazi Germany. Franklin D. Roosevelt's desire to help out overpowered the non-interventionists leading to policies such as the Lend-Lease Act. Japan's Attack on Pearl Harbor in December 1941 silenced all pacifist rhetoric.

The Civil rights movement of the 1960s was led by nonviolent direct action, that championed pacifism, drawing influence from the ideas of India's Mahatma Gandhi. Civil rights leader Martin Luther King Jr., who used or approved direct action tactics such as boycotts, felt that the goal of nonviolent direct action was to "create such a crisis and foster such a tension" as to demand a response.

After World War II the European great powers were greatly weakened, and the US became by far the largest economy in the world. The anti-capitalist pro-Communist enemy was the Soviet Union. With encouragement from London, Washington developed an interventionist foreign policy during the Cold War, funding and directly engaging with various conflicts. The US became directly involved in the Korean War, and Vietnam War. As the military situation in Vietnam deteriorated and thousands of people were drafted, an anti-war movement emerged until the removal of US soldiers in 1973. During the 1980s and 1990s and the anti-nuclear movement and anti-nuclear proliferation movements advocated against Nuclear war. After the terrorist attack in 2001, the U.S. fought a war on terror in the Middle East. Small pacifistic movements opposed the wars. Opposition to Israeli violence against Palestinians is also a common movement among American pacificists. Modern pacificism in the United States is led by both political and religious organizations such as the American Civil Liberties Union and the Catholic Peace Fellowship.

== Colonial era ==
Benjamin Lay an active pacifist and abolitionist in Colonial America

Antiwar activity in the colonial era was limited to certain churches.

=== Peace churches ===
In Colonial Pennsylvania several small German religious sects, especially the Church of the Brethren, Mennonites, and Amish were Peace churches. They clung to the antiwar positions they had developed in Europe. They minimized contact with the larger society. From the 1780s to the mid-19th century the Shakers attracted attention for their commitment to peace. They practiced celibacy but recruited heavily and numbered about 4000.

=== Quakers ===
Much more influential in the long-run was the growing pacifism of the Quakers. They were eager and able to proclaim their message widely. They controlled Pennsylvania politics until they refused to fight the Native Americans who were allied with the French enemy and attacking frontier farms. They therefore gave up power in 1755. During the American Revolution (1775–1783) their general policy was neutrality between the King and Congress, to not serve in the army, and not to pay war taxes. Quaker intellectuals and activists played a major role in developing an anti-war Peace Position and spreading the word in the new nation. In the Civil War (1861–1865), the destruction of slavery was a higher priority than pacifism. About a fourth of young Quakers fought in the army, and most supported the Civil War with taxes.

== New Nation ==
In the 1790s when France battled Great Britain, foreign policy was bitterly debated. The Federalists led by Alexander Hamilton favored Britain; the Republicans under Thomas Jefferson favored France. Under the Federalists there was a undeclared naval conflict against France in 1798-1800 called the Quasi War. When Napoleon came to power in Paris, Jefferson and his Republicans turned against France, while continuing to oppose Britain. Jefferson wanted no entangling alliances. However the effort to boycott trade with both sides in the Foreign policy of the Jefferson administration hurt the US economy.

=== War of 1812 ===
Under President James Madison and his Republican Party there was a real War of 1812 against Britain in 1812-1815. Opposition to the war was strongest in Federalist New England, and New York which conducted significant amounts of trade with the British Empire, and weakest in the Southern United States. The war started when the Jefferson and Madison fiercely opposed seizures of American shipping by Britain and France and were hostile to both sides. The British impressed American sailors who had once been British subjects into the Royal Navy and cut off U.S. trade with France. Jefferson used the Embargo Act of 1807 to gain leverage by making exports illegal. This badly hurt the New England economy; smuggling exports into Canada resulted. Jeffersonian war hawks led by Henry Clay and John Calhoun demanded war with Britain. Madison obliged in an effort to maintain American rights and honor in what contemporaries called, "The second war for independence." Vehement protests against "Mr. Madison's War" erupted in Federalist Party strongholds in New England. Three governors refused to place their state militias under Washington's control for duty outside the territory of their states. In the ensuing 1812 and 1813 United States House of Representatives elections, eight sitting New England pro-war congressmen were rejected by the voters, and several others saw the writing on the wall and declined to seek re-election. There was a complete turnover of the New Hampshire delegation.

== Organizing a peace movement ==
The war ended in February 1815. The first movement in the United States was the New York Peace Society, founded in 1815 by theologian David Low Dodge, followed by the Massachusetts Peace Society. The groups merged into the American Peace Society, which held weekly meetings and produced literature that was spread as far as Gibraltar and Malta describing the horrors of war and advocating pacifism on Christian grounds.

== Civil War ==
After the election of Abraham Lincoln in November 1860, the Deep South cotton states led by South Carolina seceded from the union and established a new Confederate States of America. A civil war was imminent, and a large fraction of public opinion, especially in the North, decried the horrors of an imminent war with massive suffering and destruction. The peace movement had weakened greatly in the 1850s, as it used violence to stop the return of runaway slaves and supported the violence in Kansas. Remaining pacifists called for peaceful separation, as did many prominent civic leaders of both parties North and South. Merle Curti notes that the traditional rhetoric of pacifism was seldom heard. Instead the pacifists said non-violence only applied to international affairs. They tolerated or engaged in violence to defend the nation, repress insurrection, and free the slaves. With the Confederate artillery attack on Fort Sumter in April 1861, the mood in the North decisively changed, bringing a hyperpatriotic emphasis on defending the United States in the name of American nationalism. The abolitionist movement had long contained a powerful pacifist element, led by William Lloyd Garrison. After Sumter the abolitionists called for an intensive total war to destroy slavery once and for all. The peace movement had weakened in the 1850s and was now practically dead, apart from a large faction of Quakers. For the rest of 1861 opposition to the war, in both North and South, was scattered and often violent; it was based on politics, not pacifism.

== Arbitration movement 1890s–1914 ==
The U.S. and Great Britain were pioneers in the use of arbitration to resolve their differences. It was first used in the Jay Treaty of 1795 negotiated by John Jay, and played a major role in the Alabama Claims case of 1872 whereby major tensions regarding the United Kingdom and the American Civil War were resolved. At the First International Conference of American States in 1890, a plan for systematic arbitration was developed, but not accepted. The Hague Peace Conference of 1899 saw the major world powers agree to a system of arbitration and the creation of a Permanent Court of Arbitration. Arbitration was widely discussed among diplomats and elites in the 1890–1914 era. The 1895 dispute between the United States and Britain over Venezuela was peacefully resolved through arbitration. Both nations realized that a mechanism was desirable to avoid possible future conflicts. The Olney-Pauncefote Treaty of 1897 was a proposed treaty between the United States and Britain in 1897 that required arbitration of major disputes. The treaty was rejected by the U.S. Senate and never went into effect.

=== Arbitration treaties of 1911–1914 ===
President William Howard Taft (1909–1913) was a major advocate of arbitration as a major reform of the Progressive Era. In 1911 Taft and his Secretary of State Philander C. Knox negotiated major treaties with Britain and with France providing that differences be arbitrated. Disputes had to be submitted to the Hague Court or other tribunal. These were signed in August 1911 but had to be ratified by a two thirds vote of the Senate. Neither Taft nor Knox consulted with members of the Senate during the negotiating process. By then many Republicans were opposed to Taft, and the president felt that lobbying too hard for the treaties might cause their defeat. He made some speeches supporting the treaties in October, but the Senate added amendments Taft could not accept, killing the agreements.

The arbitration issue opens a window on a bitter philosophical dispute among progressives. One faction, led by Taft, looked to legal arbitration as the best alternative to warfare. Taft was a constitutional lawyer who later became Chief Justice; he had a deep understanding of the legal issues. Taft's political base was the conservative business community which largely supported peace movements before 1914. However, his mistake in this case was a failure to mobilize that base. The businessmen believed that economic rivalries were cause of war, and that extensive trade led to an interdependent world that would make war a very expensive and useless anachronism.

However, an opposing faction of progressives, led by ex-president Theodore Roosevelt, ridiculed arbitration as foolhardy idealism, and insisted on the realism of warfare as the only solution to serious disputes. Taft's treaties with France and Britain were killed by Roosevelt, who had broken with his protégé Taft in 1910. They were dueling for control of the Republican Party. Roosevelt worked with his close friend Senator Henry Cabot Lodge to impose those amendments that ruined the goals of the treaties. Lodge thought the treaties impinge too much on senatorial prerogatives. Roosevelt, however, was acting to sabotage Taft's campaign promises. At a deeper level, Roosevelt truly believed that arbitration was a naïve solution and the great issues had to be decided by warfare. The Rooseveltian approach had a near-mystical faith of the ennobling nature of war. It endorsed jingoistic nationalism as opposed to the businessmen's calculation of profit and national interest.

Although no general arbitration treaty was entered into, Taft's administration settled several disputes with Great Britain by peaceful means, often involving arbitration. These included a settlement of the boundary between Maine and New Brunswick, a long-running dispute over seal hunting in the Bering Sea that also involved Japan, and a similar disagreement regarding fishing off Newfoundland.

Secretary of State William Jennings Bryan (1913–1915), a leading Democrat, worked energetically to promote international arbitration agreements. His efforts were negated by the outbreak of World War I. Bryan negotiated 28 treaties that promised arbitration of disputes before war broke out between the signatory countries and the United States. He made several attempts to negotiate a treaty with Germany, but ultimately was never able to succeed. The agreements, known officially as "Treaties for the Advancement of Peace," set up procedures for conciliation rather than for arbitration. Arbitration treaties were negotiated after the war, but attracted much less attention than the negotiation mechanism created by the League of Nations.

== Jane Addams ==
Jane Addams (1860-1935) from 1899 to her death was a major synthesizing figure in the domestic and international peace movements, serving as both a figurehead and leading theoretician. Addams was influenced especially by Russian novelist Leo Tolstoy and by the pragmatism of philosophers John Dewey and George Herbert Mead. Her books, particularly Newer Ideals of Peace (1907) and Peace and Bread in Time of War (1922), and her peace activism informed early feminist theories and perspectives on peace and war. She envisioned democracy, social justice and peace as mutually reinforcing; they all had to advance together to achieve any one. Addams became an anti-war activist from 1899, as part of the anti-imperialist movement that followed the Spanish–American War. Her book Newer Ideals of Peace (1907) reshaped the peace movement worldwide to include ideals of social justice. She recruited social justice reformers like Alice Hamilton, Lillian Wald, Florence Kelley, and Emily Greene Balch to join her in the new international women's peace movement after 1914. Addams's work came to fruition after World War I, when major institutional bodies began to link peace with social justice and probe the underlying causes of war and conflict.

In 1899 and 1907, world leaders sought peace by convening an innovative and influential peace conference at The Hague. These conferences produced Hague Conventions of 1899 and 1907. A 1914 conference was canceled due to war. The void was filled by an unofficial conference convened by Women at the Hague. At the time, both the US and The Netherlands were neutral. Addams chaired this pathbreaking International Congress of Women at the Hague, which included almost 1,200 participants from 12 warring and neutral countries. Their goal was to develop a framework to end the violence of war. Both national and international political systems excluded women's voices. The women delegates argued that the exclusion of women from policy discourse and decisions around war and peace resulted in flawed policy. The delegates adopted a series of resolutions addressing these problems and called for extending the franchise and women's meaningful inclusion in formal international peace processes at war's end. Following the conference, Addams and a congressional delegation traveled throughout Europe meeting with leaders, citizen groups, and wounded soldiers from both sides. Her leadership during the conference and her travels to the capitals of the war-torn regions were cited in nominations for the Nobel Peace Prize.

Addams was opposed to U.S. interventionism and expansionism and ultimately was against those who sought American dominance abroad. In 1915, she gave a speech at Carnegie Hall and was booed offstage for opposing U.S. intervention into World War I. Addams damned war as a cataclysm that undermined human kindness, solidarity, and civic friendship, and caused families across the world to struggle. In turn, her views were denounced by patriotic groups and newspapers during World War I (1917–18). Oswald Garrison Villard came to her defense when she suggested that armies gave liquor to soldiers just before major ground attacks. "Take the case of Jane Addams for one. With what abuse did not the [New York] Times cover her, one of the noblest of our women, because she told the simple truth that the Allied troops were often given liquor or drugs before charging across No Man's Land. Yet when the facts came out at the hands of Sir Philip Gibbs and others not one word of apology was ever forthcoming." Even after the war, the WILPF's program of peace and disarmament was characterized by opponents as radical, Communist-influenced, unpatriotic, and unfeminine. Young veterans in the American Legion, supported by some members of the Daughters of the American Revolution (DAR) and the League of Women Voters, were ill-prepared to confront the older, better-educated, more financially secure and nationally famous women of the WILPF. Nevertheless, the DAR could and did expel Addams from membership. The Legion's efforts to portray the WILPF members as dangerously naive females resonated with working class audiences, but President Calvin Coolidge and the middle classes supported Addams and her WILPF efforts in the 1920s to prohibit poison gas and outlaw war. After 1920, however, she was widely regarded as the greatest woman of the Progressive Era. In 1931, the award of the Nobel Peace prize earned her near-unanimous acclaim.

== World War I ==
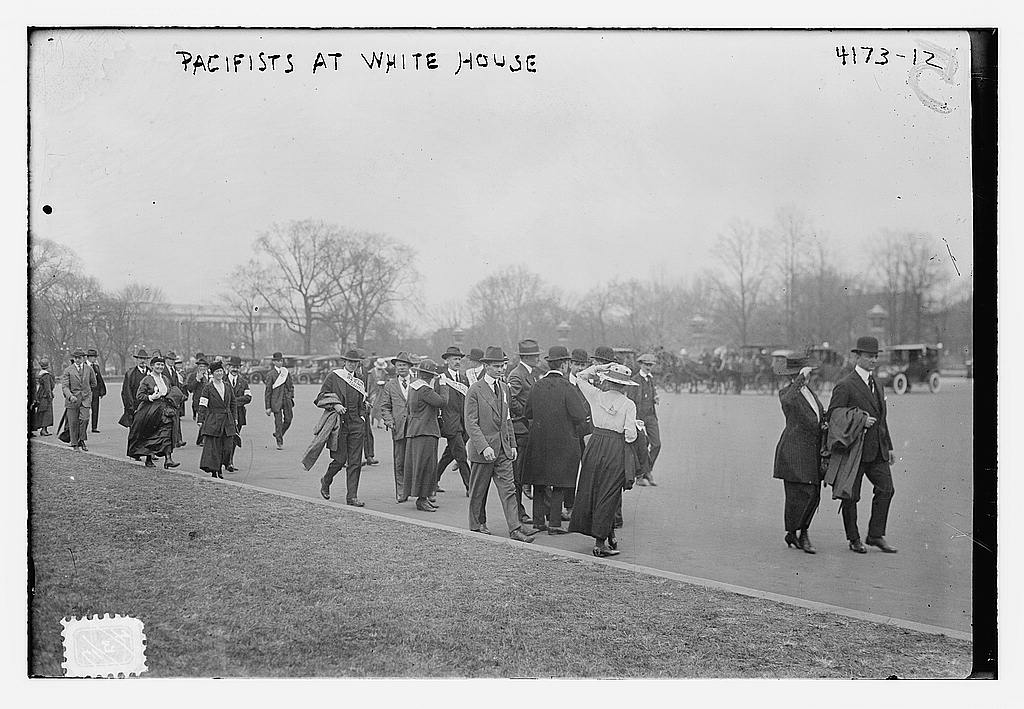
Pacifist protest next to the White house, c. 1915-1920

There is a very large scholarly literature on opposition to the war in 1914–1917.

There is less on opposition in 1917–1918, and focuses on repression of the antiwar left by the government Various anti-war women also opposed the war.

== 1920s and 1930s ==
=== League of Nations debate ===
see: Warren F. Kuehl, and Lynne Dunn, Keeping the covenant: American internationalists and the League of Nations, 1920–1939 (Kent State University Press, 1997).

=== Naval disarmament ===
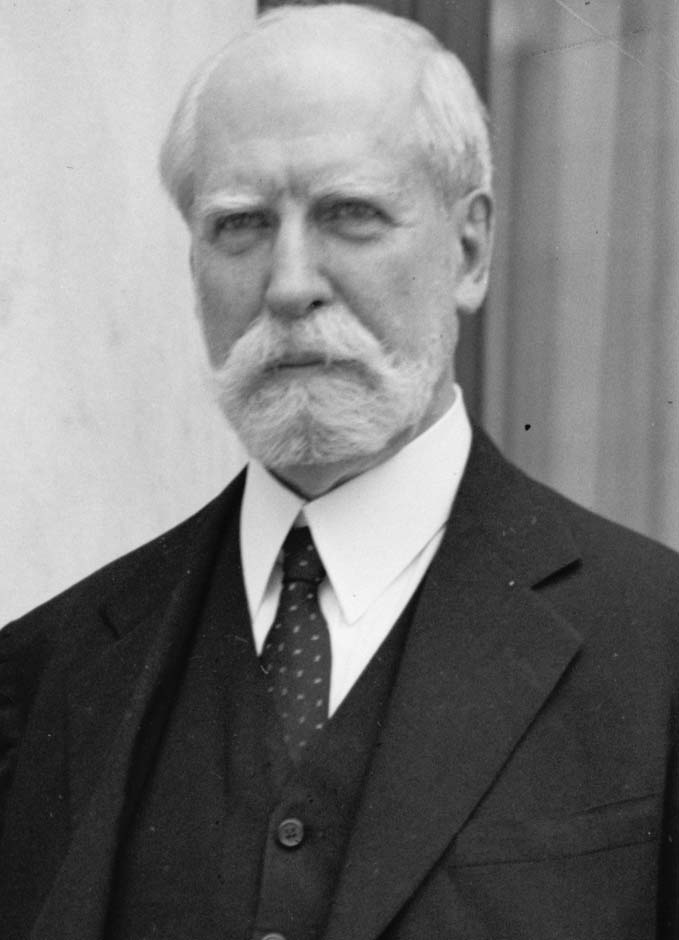
Charles Evans Hughes, former Supreme Court Justice and Harding's Secretary of State

While many peace activists in the 1920s were disappointed that the U.S. never joined the League of Nations of the World Court, they did support American leadership in achieving a major reduction in naval weapons among the leading powers. The Washington conference was heavily promoted by the major peace groups: the World Peace Foundation; the American Association for International Conciliation; the Carnegie Endowment for International Peace; the Women's Peace Society; the Women's World Disarmament Committee; the Women's International League for Peace and Freedom, and the Federal Council of Churches of Christ in America.

At the end of World War I, the United States had the largest navy and one of the largest armies in the world. With no serious threat to the United States itself, the White House presided over the disarmament of the navy and the army. The army shrank to 140,000 men, while naval reduction was based on a policy of parity with Britain.Herring (2008), pp. 439–440 Seeking to prevent an arms race, Senator William Borah won passage of a congressional resolution calling for a 50 percent reduction of the American Navy, the British Navy, and the Japanese Navy. With Congress's backing, Harding and Hughes began preparations to hold a naval disarmament conference in Washington. The Washington Naval Conference convened in November 1921, with representatives from the U.S., Japan, Britain, France, Italy, China, Belgium, the Netherlands, and Portugal—but not Germany (which had no navy) or the Soviet Union. Secretary of State Charles Evans Hughes assumed a primary role in the conference and made the pivotal proposal—the U.S. would reduce its number of warships by 30 if Great Britain decommissioned 19 ships and Japan decommissioned 17 ships. A journalist covering the conference wrote that "Hughes sank in thirty-five minutes more ships than all of the admirals of the world have sunk in a cycle of centuries."

The conference produced six treaties and twelve resolutions among the participating nations. The United States, Britain, Japan, and France reached the Four-Power Treaty, in which each country agreed to respect the territorial integrity of one another in the Pacific Ocean. Those four powers as well as Italy also reached the Washington Naval Treaty, which established a ratio of battleship tonnage that each country agreed to respect. In the Nine-Power Treaty, each signatory agreed to respect the Open Door Policy in China, and Japan agreed to return Shandong to China. The treaties only remained in effect until the mid-1930s, however, and ultimately failed. Japan eventually invaded Manchuria and the arms limitations no longer had any effect. The building of "monster warships" resumed and the U.S. and Great Britain were unable to quickly rearm themselves to defend an international order and stop Japan from remilitarizing.

=== Kellogg–Briand Pact ===
The Kellogg–Briand Pact – officially the General Treaty for Renunciation of War as an Instrument of National Policy is a 1928 international agreement on peace in which signatory states promised not to use war to resolve "disputes or conflicts of whatever nature or of whatever origin they may be, which may arise among them". The plan was devised by American lawyers Salmon Levinson and James T. Shotwell, and promoted by Senator William E. Borah.

The pact was signed in August 1928 by fifteen nations: Australia, Belgium, Canada, Czechoslovakia, France, Germany, Great Britain, India, the Irish Free State, Italy, Japan, New Zealand, Poland, South Africa, and the United States. Another 47 soon joined. Sponsored by France and the U.S., the Pact is named after its authors, United States Secretary of State Frank B. Kellogg and French foreign minister Aristide Briand. The pact was concluded outside the League of Nations and remains in effect today. It formally condemned "recourse to war for the solution of international controversies." It put into effect the long-standing pacifist goal that interstate wars be declared a violation of international law. The axhievement was recognized when Briand and Kellogg were jointly awarded the Nobel Peace Prize in 1929.

A common criticism is that the Kellogg–Briand Pact did prevent wars—but that was not its object. It was unable to prevent the Second World War but it was the base for trial of Nazi leaders in 1946. They were executed as punishment for violating Kellogg-Briand. Furthermore, declared wars became very rare after 1945. Realists have ridiculed it for its moralism and legalism. Nevertheless, the pact served as the legal basis for the concept of a crime against peace, for which the Nuremberg Tribunal and Tokyo Tribunal tried and executed the top leaders responsible for starting World War II.

Similar provisions to those in the Kellogg–Briand Pact were later incorporated into the Charter of the United Nations and other treaties, which gave rise to a more activist American foreign policy which began with the signing of the pact.

== World War II ==
In the 1930s influential theologian Reinhold Niebuhr rejected overly idealist pacifism as "perverse sentimentality," in favor of just war.

=== Public opinion ===
In a Gallup poll conducted in the opening days of the war (September 1 to September 6, 1939), Americans were asked if the US should "declare war on Germany in support of England, France and Poland and should deploy forces to assist those countries." They gave a strong "No!," with 90% saying no and 8% saying yes. In a separate question from the same poll, respondents were asked what level of assistance should be given to the British, Polish and French. When asked about selling food, 74% agreed while 27% disagreed; for sending airplanes "and other war materials" to the United Kingdom and France 58% would agree with 42% disagreeing; when asked if army and naval forces should be deployed "abroad" to fight Germany 16% said yes with 84% saying no.

During the stalemated "Phoney War" (October 1939 to spring 1940), public opinion in the US was strongly opposed to entering the war against Germany on the side of Britain and France. A poll in March 1940 found that 96 percent of Americans were against going to war with Germany.

=== Opposition elements ===
The Communist Party opposed American involvement in the early stages of World War II, starting in August 1939, when the Molotov–Ribbentrop Pact launched a deal between Stalin and Hitler that allowed Moscow to split control of Eastern Europe with Berlin. Communist activists in CIO labor unions tried to slow the flow of munitions to Britain. Leftist organizations like the American Peace Mobilization and veterans of the Abraham Lincoln Brigade protested in opposition to the war, the draft, and the Lend-Lease Act. They said of Lend-Lease, "Roosevelt needs its dictatorial powers to further his aim of carving out of a warring world, the American Empire so long desired by the Wall Street money lords." Overnight on June 22, 1941, the date of the German invasion of the Soviet Union, the Communists reversed positions and became war hawks.

Numerous women activists, notably within the Mothers' movement led by Elizabeth Dilling, opposed American involvement on the basis that it would be preferable for Nazism rather than Communism to dominate Europe. These women also wished to keep their own sons out of the combat US involvement in the war would necessitate, and believed the war would destroy Christianity and further spread atheistic Communism across Europe.

Henry Ford, a long-time pacifist, opposed US participation in the war until the attack on Pearl Harbor. Before then he refused to manufacture airplanes and other war equipment for the British. Father Charles Coughlin urged the US to keep out of the war and permit Germany to conquer Great Britain and the Soviet Union. Asked Coughlin, "Must the entire world go to war for 600,000 Jews in Germany?" The most radical of isolationists would say that all of the current problems in the US were because of World War I. US Senator Gerald Nye from North Dakota would even blame the Great Depression on America's economic expansion during World War I.

Isolationism was strongest in the United States, where oceans separated it on both sides from the war fronts. The German-American Bund even marched down the avenues of New York City demanding isolationism. The isolationists, led by the America First Committee, were a large, vocal, and powerful challenge to President Roosevelt's efforts to enter the war. Charles Lindbergh was perhaps the most famous isolationist. Isolationism was strongest in the Midwest with its strong German-American population.

Students at UC Berkeley in 1940 led a large protest in opposition to the war. The Keep America Out of War Committee (KAOWC) from its founding on March 6, 1938 until when the America First Committee formed in the fall of 1940 it was the only nationwide organization to oppose any foreign intervention and President Roosevelt's foreign policy. The KAOWC was for most of its lifetime composed of 6 pacifist groups apart from the Socialist Party of America: The Peace Section of the American Friends Service Committee (ALSC), Fellowship for Reconciliation (FOR), World Peace Commission of the Methodist Church, American Section of the Women's International League for Peace and Freedom (WIL), National Council for the Prevention of War (NCPW) and the War Resisters League (WRL). After the Attack on Pearl Harbor, the KAOWC would end up dissolving.

With the Pearl Harbor attack in December 1941, nearly all the noninterventionist elements quickly switched to support the war.

== Cold War: 1947–1989 ==
=== Korean War ===
American opposition to the Korean War (1950–1953) came primarily from the small far–left group the American Peace Crusade, formed in 1951. It gained little support. However the high-casualty stalemate in 1951–52 came under increasing political attack from the Republican Party and especially from its 1952 presidential candidate Dwight D. Eisenhower.

=== Vietnam War ===
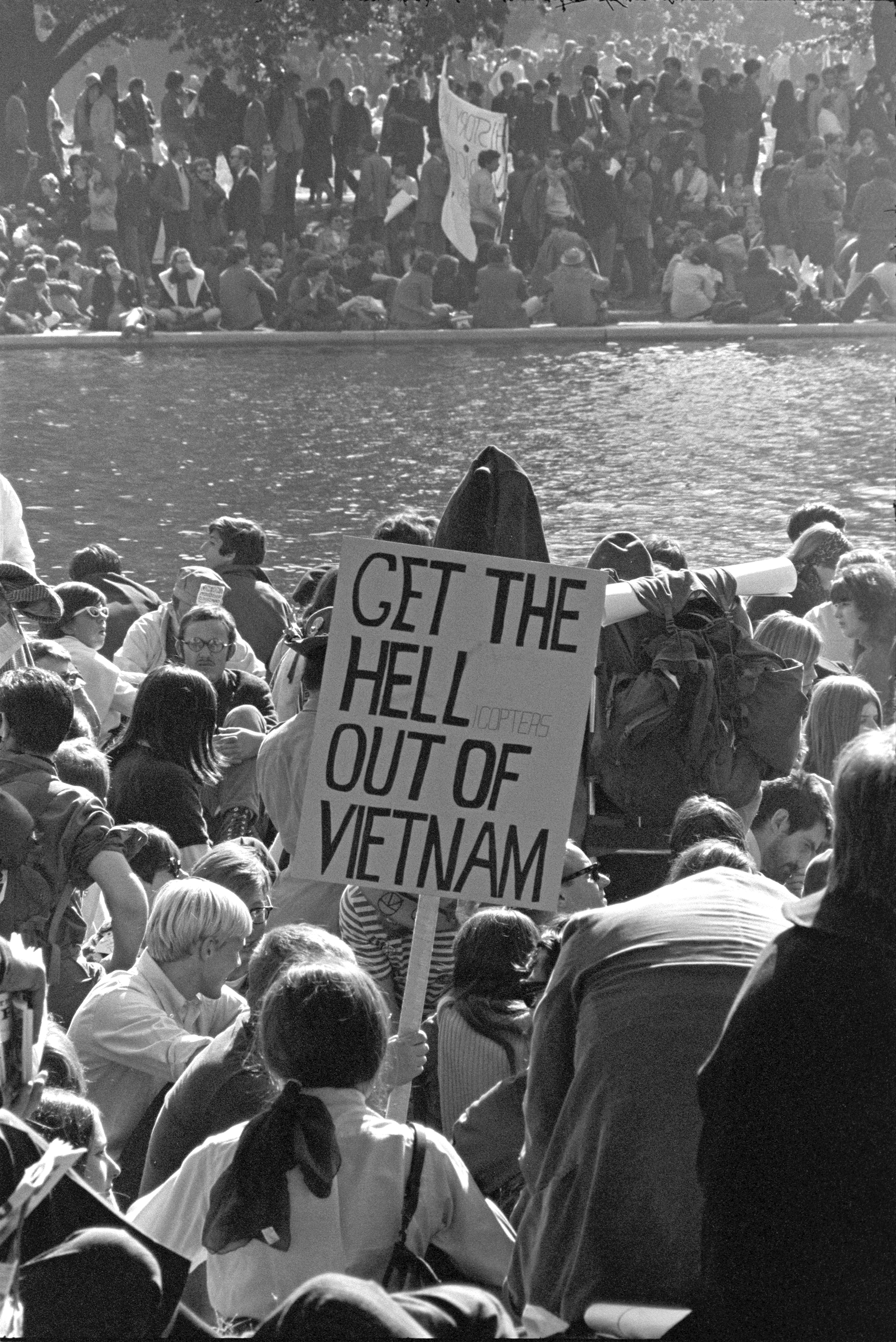
Protesters against the Vietnam War prepare to march on the Pentagon on October 21, 1967.

The anti-Vietnam War peace movement began during the 1960s in the United States, opposing U.S. involvement in the Vietnam War. Some within the movement advocated a unilateral withdrawal of American forces from South Vietnam.

Opposition to the Vietnam War aimed to unite groups opposed to U.S. anti-communism, imperialism, capitalism and colonialism, such as New Left groups and the Catholic Worker Movement. Others, such as Stephen Spiro, opposed the war based on the just war theory.

In 1965, the movement began to gain national prominence. Provocative actions by police and protesters turned anti-war demonstrations in Chicago at the 1968 Democratic National Convention into a riot. News reports of American military abuses such as the 1968 My Lai massacre brought attention (and support) to the anti-war movement, which continued to expand for the duration of the conflict.

High-profile opposition to the Vietnam war turned to street protests in an effort to turn U.S. political opinion against the war. The protests gained momentum from the civil rights movement, which had organized to oppose segregation laws. They were fueled by a growing network of underground newspapers and large rock festivals, such as Woodstock. Opposition to the war moved from college campuses to middle-class suburbs, government institutions, and labor unions.

=== 1980s ===
Near the end of the Cold War, U.S. peace activists focused on slowing the nuclear arms race in the hope of reducing the possibility of nuclear war between the U.S. and the USSR. As the Reagan administration accelerated military spending and adopted a tough stance toward Russia, the Nuclear Freeze campaign and Beyond War movement sought to educate the public on the inherent risk and ruinous cost of Reagan's policy. Outreach to individual citizens in the Soviet Union and mass meetings using satellite-link technology were major parts of peacemaking activity during the 1980s. In 1981, the activist Thomas began the longest uninterrupted peace vigil in U.S. history. He was later joined at Lafayette Square in Washington, D.C. by anti-nuclear activists Concepción Picciotto and Ellen Thomas.

== 1990s ==
In response to Iraq's invasion of Kuwait in 1990, President George H. W. Bush began preparing for war in the region. Peace activists were starting to gain traction with popular rallies, especially on the West Coast, just before the Gulf War began in February 1991. The ground war ended in less than a week with a lopsided Allied victory, and a media-incited wave of patriotic sentiment washed over the nascent protest movement.

During the 1990s, peacemaker priorities included seeking a solution to the Israeli–Palestinian impasse, humanitarian assistance to war-torn regions such as Bosnia and Rwanda, and aid to post-war Iraq. American peace activists brought medicine into Iraq in defiance of U.S. law, resulting in heavy fines and imprisonment for some. The principal groups involved included Voices in the Wilderness and the Fellowship of Reconciliation.

== Iraq War ==
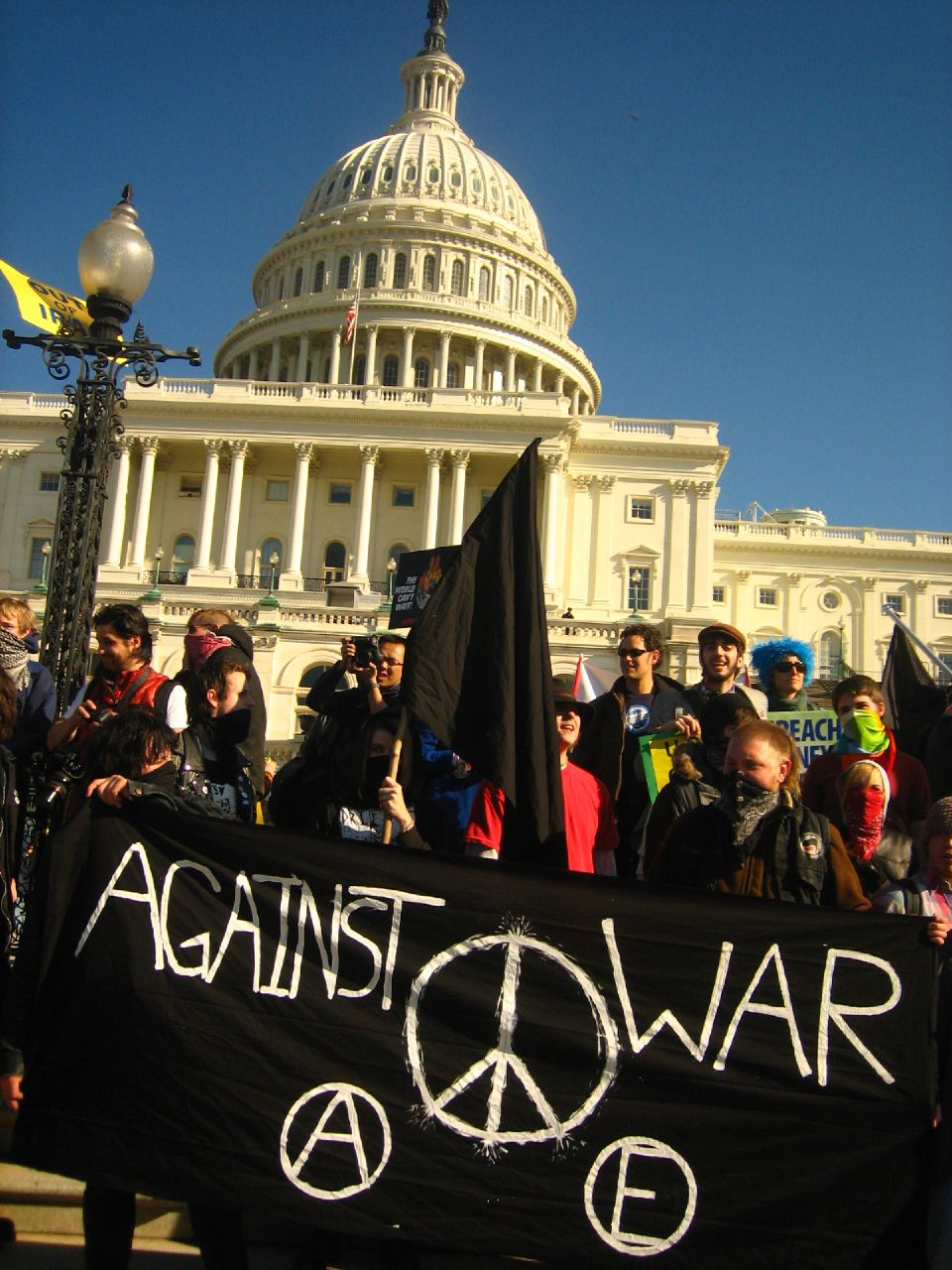
Protest against the Iraq war, 2007

The Iraq War was met with considerable popular opposition in the United States, beginning during the planning stages and continuing through the invasion subsequent occupation of Iraq. The months leading up to the war saw protests across the United States, the largest of which, held on February 15, 2003 involved about 300,000 to 400,000 protesters in New York City, with smaller numbers protesting in Seattle, San Francisco, Chicago, and other cities. During the Iraq war roughly 76% of those polled supported the war, although this support declined due to collapse of the military situation. Opposition to the Iraq war was motivated by humanitarian concerns, and claims that the US motivation was resource extraction.

== Historiography ==
According to Charles De Benedetti:

In the American manner, peace history is less a field than a clearing where different practitioners of diplomatic, social, religious, cultural, and intellectual history have come together to consider why, how, and with what effect various people have worked in the past to extend peace as a central ordering process in human relations.

See also Howlett, Charles F. "Studying America's Struggle against War: An Historical Perspective." The History Teacher 36.3 (2003): 297–330. and Wingate, Jennifer. "Real art, war art, and the politics of peace memorials in the United States After World War I." Public Art Dialogue 2.2 (2012): 162–189. [absence of stridently pacifist imagery in memorials of 1920; deep divisions and angry debates among artists]

== See also ==
- Peace movement in the United States
- List of peace activists
- List of anti-war organizations in the United States
- Conscientious objector § United States
- Carnegie Endowment for International Peace (est. 1910)
- Military history of the United States
- Christian pacifism

== Bibliography ==
=== Published in 20th century ===
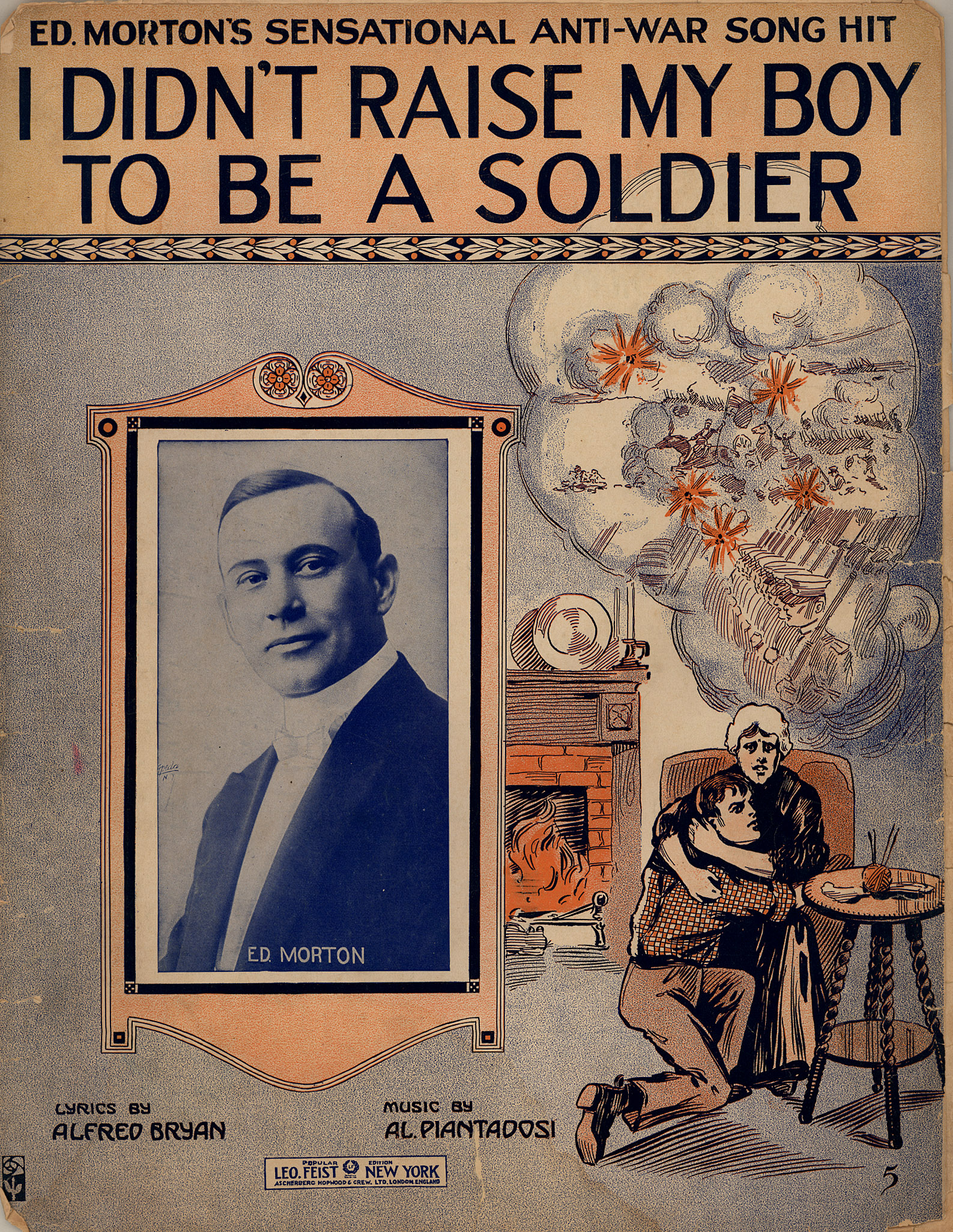
I Didn't Raise My Boy To Be A Soldier 1915 sheet music cover.

- Merle Curti (1936). Peace or War: The American Struggle, 1636–1936. New York.
- Guy Franklin Hershberger (1939). "Pacifism and the State in Colonial Pennsylvania". Church History. 8 (1): 54–74. doi:10.2307/3159866. JSTOR 3159866. S2CID 154601682.
- Robert Moats Miller. (1956) "The Attitudes of the Major Protestant Churches in America Toward War and Peace, 1919–1929," The Historian 19#1 pp 15–26.
- H.C. Peterson and Gilbert C. Fite. Opponents of War. 1917-1918 (1957) online.
- Staughton Lynd, ed. Nonviolence in America: A Documentary History (Bobbs Merrill, 1966); Primary sources.
- Peter Brock (1968). Pacifism in the United States: From the Colonial Era to the First World War. Princeton UP.; 1010pages; very detailed coverage.
- Charles Chatfield (1970). "World War I and the Liberal Pacifist in the United States". American Historical Review. 75 (7): 1920–1937. doi:10.2307/1848023. JSTOR 1848023.
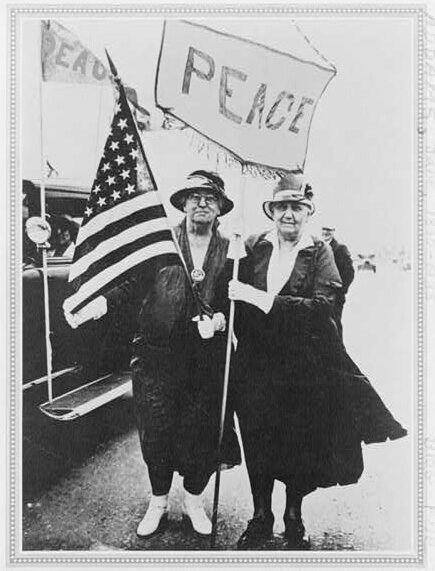
- Mary McDowell & Jane Addams campaign for peace in 1920s
  Charles Chatfield (1971). For peace and justice: Pacifism in America, 1914–1941 (University of Tennessee Press), a major scholarly survey.
- Mantell, Matthew Edwin. "Opposition to the Korean War: A study in American dissent" (PhD dissertation, New York University ProQuest Dissertations Publishing, 1973. 7319947).
- Charles De Benedetti. Origins of the modern American peace movement, 1915–1929 (1978)
- Andrew Wilson. The Disarmer's Handbook of Military Technology and Organization (Penguin, 1983), with focus on NATO versus Soviets.
- Charles De Benedetti (1984). The Peace Reform in American History. Indiana University Press. ISBN 978-0-253-20320-5.
- Charles De Benedetti. "Peace History, in the American Manner" The History Teacher 18#1 (Nov., 1984), pp. 75–110
- Lawrence S. Witner (1984). Rebels against war: The American peace movement, 1933–1983 (Temple University Press) online 1969 edition with coverage to 1960
- Charles F. Howlett; Glen Zeitzer (1985). The American Peace Movement: History and Historiography. American Historical Association. ISBN 978-0-87229-032-7.
- Harold Josephson, ed. Biographical Dictionary of Modern Peace Leaders (Greenwood, 1985) 1131 pages; Short scholarly biographies, Worldwide coverage.
- Peter Brock. Pacifism in the United States from the colonial era to the First World War. (1968) online
- Rob Kroes (1986). "Pacifism as an Un-American Activity". Revue française d'études américaines. 29 (29): 277–289. doi:10.3406/rfea.1986.1238. ISSN 0397-7870 – via Persée.
- Guenter Levy. Peace and Revolution: the moral crisis of American pacifism (Eerdman's, 1988). critical evaluation of the work of four major pacifist organizations: the American Friends Service Committee; Fellowship of Reconciliation; Women's International League for Peace and Freedom; War Resisters League
- Daniel, C. Thomas and Michael T. Klare, eds .Peace and World Order Studies" A curriculum guide (Westview Press. 5th edition, 1989). online, with 60 university course syllabi.

==== 1990s ====
- James F. Childress (1991). "Contemporary pacifism: its major types and possible contributions to discourse about war". In George Weigel and John Langan (ed.). The American Search for Peace: Moral Reasoning, Religious Hope, and National Security. Georgetown University Press. ISBN 0-87840-507-0.
- R.C. Peace III (1991). A just and lasting peace: The US peace movement from the Cold War to desert storm (Noble Press, Chicago)
- John Whiteclay Chambers, ed. (1992) The Eagle and the Dove: The American Peace Movement and United States Foreign Policy, 1900–1922 (Syracuse University Press0 online
- Charles Chatfield (1992). The American peace movement: Ideal and activism (New York)
- Harriet Hyman Alonso (1993). Peace As a Women's Issue: A History of the U.S. Movement for World Peace and Women's Rights. Syracuse University Press. ISBN 978-0-8156-0269-9.
- Charles W. Freeman, Jr. (1994). "Peace". Diplomat's Dictionary. Washington DC: National Defense University Press. ISBN 978-0-7881-2566-9.
- Anne Klejment and Nancy L. Roberts, ed. (1996). American Catholic Pacifism: The Influence of Dorothy Day and the Catholic Worker Movement. Greenwood. ISBN 978-0-275-94784-2.
- Jack D. Marietta (1996). ""The things that make for peace" : the context of pacifism in Quaker Pennsylvania". In Harvey Leonard Dyck (ed.). Pacifist Impulse in Historical Perspective. University of Toronto Press. ISBN 978-0-8020-0777-3.
- Michael A. Lutzker (1996). "Themes and contradictions in the American peace movement, 1895–1917". In Harvey Leonard Dyck (ed.). Pacifist Impulse in Historical Perspective. University of Toronto Press. ISBN 978-0-8020-0777-3.
- C. Smith (1996). Resisting Reagan: The US-Central America peace movement. (University of Chicago Press)
- Warren F. Kuehl, and Lynne Dunn, (1997)Keeping the covenant: American internationalists and the League of Nations, 1920-1939 (Kent State University Press)
- John Whiteclay Chambers, ed. (1999). "Pacifism". Oxford Companion to American Military History. Oxford University Press. ISBN 978-0-19-507198-6.
- Rachel Waltner Goossen (1999). "Pacifist professional women on the job in the United States". In Peter Brock and Thomas Paul Socknat (ed.). Challenge to Mars: Essays on Pacifism from 1918 to 1945. University of Toronto Press. ISBN 978-0-8020-4371-9.
- Jeffrey D. Schultz and Laura A. Van Assendelft, ed. (1999). "Pacifism". Encyclopedia of Women in American Politics. Greenwood. ISBN 978-1-57356-131-0.
- Peter Brock, and Nigel Young. Pacifism in the Twentieth Century (Syracuse University Press, 1999).

=== Published in 21st century ===
==== 2000s ====
- Peter Brock, ed. (2002). Liberty and Conscience: A Documentary History of the Experiences of Conscientious Objectors in America through the Civil War. Oxford University Press. ISBN 978-0-19-803447-6.
- Immanuel Ness, ed. (2004). "Antiwar/Protest Movements". Encyclopedia of American Social Movements. Vol. 3. Routledge. pp. 1037–1114. ISBN 978-1-317-47189-9.
- C.F. Howlett (2005). History of the American peace movement 1890–2000: The emergence of a new scholarly discipline Edwin Mellen Press, New York
- Ted Gottfried (2006). Fight for Peace: A History of Antiwar Movements in America. Minneapolis: Twenty-First Century Books. ISBN 978-0-7613-2932-9.
- James G. Ryan; Leonard Schlup (2006). "Pacifism". Historical Dictionary of the 1940s. M.E. Sharpe. ISBN 978-0-7656-2107-8.
- Herring, George C. (2008). From Colony to Superpower: U.S. Foreign Relations since 1776. Oxford University Presss.
- Joseph Kip Kosek (2009). Acts of Conscience: Christian Nonviolence and Modern American Democracy. Columbia University Press. ISBN 978-0-231-14419-3.

==== 2010s ====
- Young, Nigel, ed. The Oxford International Encyclopedia of Peace (4 vol. Oxford UP) global coverage; online in Oxford Reference; publisher blurb
- Robert Mann, ed. Wartime Dissent in America: A History and Anthology (Palgrave Macmillan, 2010) excerpt
- Martin Folly; Niall Palmer (2010). "Pacifism". Historical Dictionary of U.S. Diplomacy from World War I through World War II. Scarecrow Press. ISBN 978-0-8108-7376-6.
- Lara Leigh Kelland (2010). "Peace Movements". In Robert D. Johnston (ed.). Encyclopedia of U.S. Political History. Vol. 4: From the Gilded Age through Age of Reform, 1878 to 1920. CQ Press. pp. 271–274. ISBN 9781604266474. OCLC 462906611.
- Cynthia Wachtell (2010). War No More: The Antiwar Impulse in American Literature, 1861–1914. Louisiana State University Press. ISBN 978-0-8071-3750-5.
- Ronald B. Frankum Jr. (2011). "Antiwar Movement". Historical Dictionary of the War in Vietnam. Scarecrow Press. ISBN 978-0-8108-7956-0.
- Andrew Hunt (2011). "Pacifism". In Michael Kazin (ed.). The Concise Princeton Encyclopedia of American Political History. Princeton University Press. ISBN 978-0-691-15207-3.
- Marian Mollin (2011). Radical Pacifism in Modern America: Egalitarianism and Protest. University of Pennsylvania Press. ISBN 978-0-8122-0282-3. (About the 1940s–1970s)
- Louisa Thomas (27 August 2011), "Give Pacifism a Chance", New York Times
- Marian Mollin (2013). "Pacifism". In Thomas J. Lynch (ed.). Oxford Encyclopedia of American Military and Diplomatic History. Oxford University Press. pp. 113–117. ISBN 978-0-19-975925-5.
- Richard Fanning, (2014) Peace and Disarmament: Naval Rivalry and Arms Control, 1922–1933 (University Press of Kentucky) online
- Michael Kazin. (2017) War Against War: The American Fight for Peace, 1914–1918 (Simon and Schuster). online
- Mitchell K. Hall, ed. (2018) Opposition to War: An Encyclopedia of U.S. Peace and Antiwar Movements (2 vol. ABC-CLIO), thorough coverage

=== Primary sources ===
- Lynd, Staughton, and Alice Lynd, eds. Nonviolence in America: A documentary history (3rd ed. Orbis Books, 2018).
- Stellato, Jesse, ed. Not in Our Name: American Antiwar Speeches, 1846 to the Present (Pennsylvania State University Press, 2012). 287 pp
