= Nico Smith =

South African minister and activist (1929–2010)

Nicolaas Johannes Smith (1929 – 19 June 2010) was a South African Afrikaner minister and prominent opponent of apartheid. Smith was a professor of theology at the University of Stellenbosch, a member of the Afrikaner Broederbond (Afrikaner Brotherhood) organization, and a minister of the apartheid-supporting Dutch Reformed Church (DRC). However, he abandoned his upper-class lifestyle to live with the impoverished and segregated blacks of Mamelodi, a township in the east of Pretoria. From Mamelodi, he worked to support the black community and oppose apartheid. Smith joined the Dutch Reformed Church in Africa (DRCA), the separate branch of the Dutch Reformed Church for non-whites, due to the DRC's refusal to oppose apartheid.

== Early life and professional career ==
Smith grew up in the rural reaches of the Orange Free State, and was raised by his father with conventional Afrikaner views on the inferiority of coloureds and blacks at the time. He "took to the streets" to celebrate the 1948 election in which the pro-apartheid National Party won the most seats (despite losing the popular vote). Smith spent seven years at the University of Pretoria where he earned his theology degree. He was ordained a minister of the apartheid-supporting Dutch Reformed Church. Smith spent a 7-year period doing missionary work in the black homeland of Venda, where he saw the gap between white and black in South African society up close. He then spent three years performing staff work at the Dutch Reformed Church headquarters in Pretoria. While in Pretoria he received an invitation to join the prestigious Afrikaner Broederbond, which included many of the elites of Afrikaner society and government. Smith would later say of his 10-year membership of the Brotherhood that he was "thankful that God gave me an opportunity to discover what was going on in the hearts and minds of Afrikaners." Smith continued his professional ascent with the help of the Brotherhood, and he was appointed professor of theology at the University of Stellenbosch.

While Smith still held to typical white South African views of the time, the seeds for his later change of position were planted in the 1960s and '70s. Smith credited Swiss theologian Karl Barth for helping him eventually decide to fight apartheid. In 1963, Barth asked him if he was really free to preach the Gospel in South Africa. Barth asked him the question three times, concluding with "Will you be free to preach the Gospel even if the government in your country tells you that you are preaching against the whole system?" Smith found that "I could not really answer the question truthfully. I thought I was free, and yet I was not sure." Smith later said that he realized he "would have to decide to teach my theology but not apply it, or apply it and take the consequences."

== Anti-apartheid activism ==
In 1981, Smith could no longer keep his membership in the Afrikaner Broederbond in good conscience. He quit, and compared it to social suicide – many of his "friends" suddenly wanted nothing to do with him. Smith began aggressively challenging apartheid in his classes, which drew the ire of his superiors who wanted him to "Teach theory, not conclusions." Smith joined public protests against the government's bulldozing of squatter shacks in Cape Town, and he was called before a church commission to justify himself. Smith decided to resign his professorship and leave the DRC to join its separate colored branch, the Dutch Reformed Church in Africa. Smith, together with his wife Ellen, became an anti-apartheid activist from that point onward. He began preaching in Mamelodi in 1982, a suburb of Pretoria designated for non-whites only at the time due to the Group Areas Act. Smith eventually received rare permission from the South African government to live there in 1985, making him and his wife the only whites allowed to live in the area. In Mamelodi, he not only acted as minister, but also as a community organizer and civic planner. To encourage integration and interaction between the separated communities, he organized a further swap in 1988 – 170 whites moved into Mamelodi to live with black families, while 35 blacks lived in white homes in the suburbs of Pretoria. The exchange lasted four days. At the time, few whites knew how blacks lived due to strict segregation rules. Black neighborhoods were avoided and perceived as dangerous. Smith explained that he ran the swap because "White fear is one of the great barriers to understanding and progress in this country... But over the past two years there has been an increasing realization by whites of the depth and the degree of black anger." The swap was attacked as "designed to promote Marxist doctrine", as nearly any opposition to apartheid was called a communist plot to destabilize the country. Smith also demanded an investigation into suspicious murders of anti-apartheid activists.

In 1989, he moved back to a white suburb of Pretoria. Smith's South African model of the in-home meal and story sharing earned the 1989 Beyond War Award, and inspired the sustained Jewish-Palestinian Living Room Dialogue Group in the United States.

== Later years ==
After the fall of apartheid, Smith helped build a multiracial congregation in Pretoria. Smith continued to be a critic of the (originally white-only) Dutch Reformed Church for perceived slowness in integrating with the Uniting Reformed Church in Southern Africa (the successor to the anti-apartheid Dutch Reformed Church in Africa). He wrote Die Afrikaner Broederbond: Belewinge van die Binnekant, a book critical of the Afrikaner Broederbond, in 2009. He still opined on politics as well; in a 2009 article in the Afrikaans newspaper Beeld, he warned Afrikaners that the democratic transition of 1994 had averted a disaster akin to the near-complete exile of white Algerians after the Algerian Independence War. There, France and its white Algerian minority did not give up power peacefully, which led to the violence of the war. In Smith's view, too much nostalgia for the old days of special "cultural rights" risked a similar disaster; white Afrikaners should not complain about the black-dominated government in racial terms or ask for an end to affirmative action, but instead be loyal citizens of South Africa.

Smith died of a heart attack on 19 June 2010. He was 81 years old. African National Congress spokesman Jackson Mthembu paid tribute to him as a "gallant fighter, and [we] will forever treasure the contribution he made in the struggle for liberation and the building of our democracy."

In 2012, the city of Pretoria renamed 27 streets in its central business district to better reflect the diversity of modern South Africa. Michael Brink Street was renamed to Nico Smith street in Smith's honor.
