= PCRC =

PCRC may be an abbreviation for:

- Panama Canal Railway Company, an operator of the Panama Canal Railway
- Peninsula Conflict Resolution Center
