= Temple B'Nai Israel (Olean, New York) =

Temple B'Nai Israel (former)
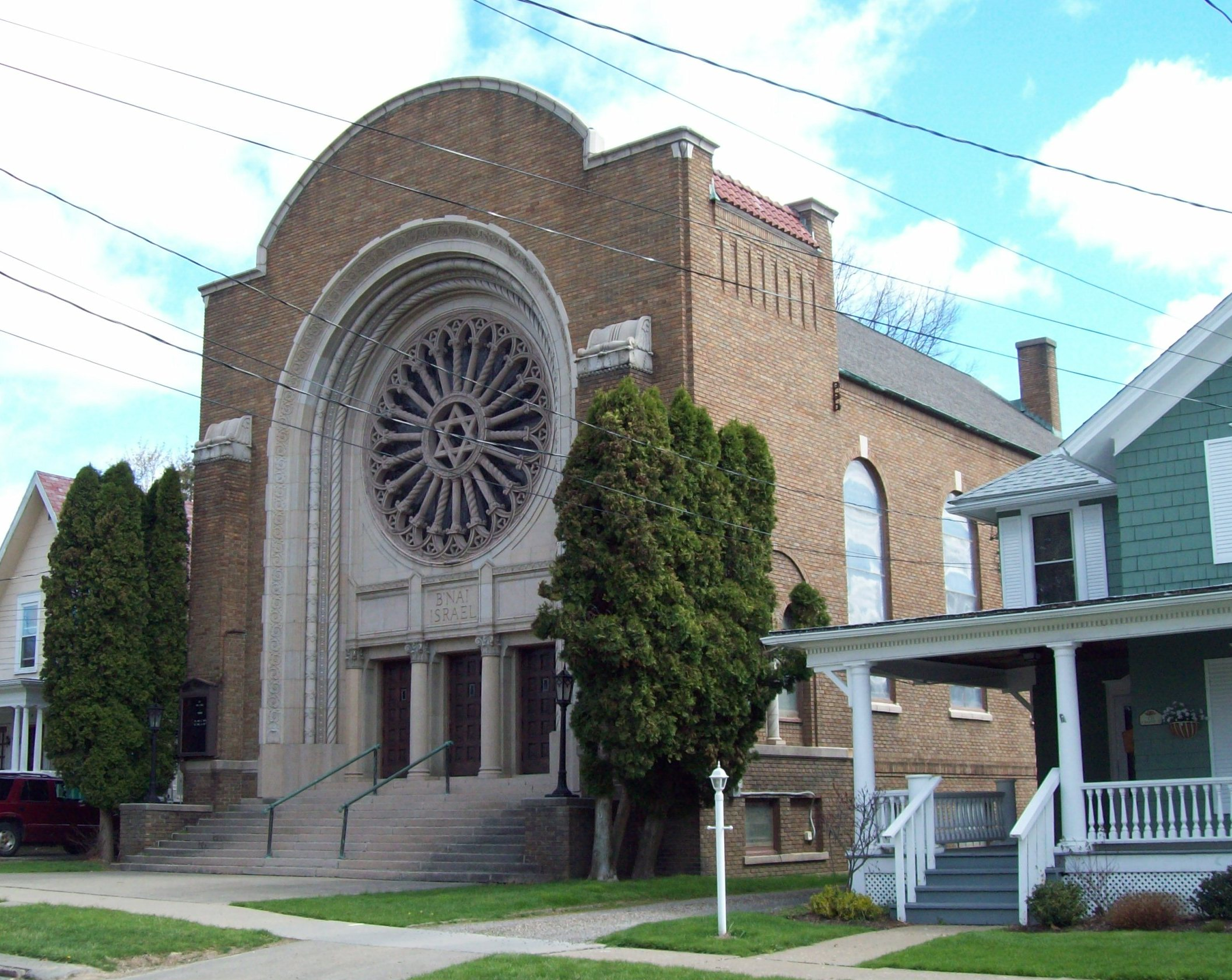
- The former Temple B'Nai Israel, in 2012

- Location in New York

Religion
- Affiliation: Conservative Judaism (former)
- Ecclesiastical or organizational status: Synagogue (1929 – 2019)
- Status: Closed and deconsecrated

Location
- Location: 127 S. Barry Street, Olean, Cattaraugus County, New York
- Interactive map of Temple B'Nai Israel (former)
- Coordinates: 42°04′34.5″N 78°25′39″W

Architecture
- Architect: J. Milton Hurd
- Founder: Harris W. Marcus
- Established: 1894 (as a congregation)
- Completed: 1929
- Temple B'Nai Israel
- U.S. National Register of Historic Places
- Area: less than one acre
- NRHP reference No.: 11000995
- Added to NRHP: January 4, 2012

Temple B'Nai Israel, now operating as the Olean Community Theatre, is a deconsecrated synagogue and stage venue located in Olean, Cattaraugus County, New York, in the United States. The synagogue was erected in 1929, closed in 2019 and was deconsecrated in December 2020; the building was listed on the National Register of Historic Places in 2012 and has been used as a community theater since the deconsecration. The B'Nai Israel Congregation that occupied the synagogue, a Conservative/Reform Jewish congregation established in 1894 as the Olean Hebrew Association, continues to operate using rented space elsewhere in Olean.

== History ==
The congregation was established by Harris W. Marcus, a native of Mobile, Alabama who had moved from Brooklyn and settled in Olean in 1881, establishing the first Jewish community in the region. Its attendance peaked during the World War II era as Jewish communities joined in solidarity against the ongoing Holocaust. A Sefer Torah was donated in 1941 by Oscar Rosenbloom, a local merchant.

The membership was down to 23 families as of 2017. B'Nai Israel continued to hold its twice-monthly regular services at the time, but it was said to be in danger of closing within a decade due to the ongoing exodus of young people from the Olean region. Since deconsecrating its synagogue in 2020, it has rented space in the former Saint John's School on North Union Street for services.

== Heritage building ==
B'Nai Israel's synagogue building from 1929 to 2019 was a three- to four-story tall, light brown brick structure with terra cotta decorative details. (Before the Temple was constructed, the Olean Jewish community had rented facilities to serve as a house of worship.) Built in 1929, it measures 85 feet long, 42 feet wide, and 50 feet tall. The front facade features a massive arched terra cotta portal encircling a large, round stained glass window. It was listed on the National Register of Historic Places in 2012.

In July 2019, the synagogue announced that it would be closing after Yom Kippur services that fall as it sought to rent a smaller facility. A zoning variance was unanimously approved in August to allow the deconsecration. A Torah originally donated to the congregation was reunited with a family member of the original donor in 2019, Oscar Rosenbloom Jr., who then donated it to Camp Towonga, a Jewish youth summer camp outside Yosemite National Park in Northern California. The temple was formally deconsecrated in December 2020; attendance had fallen even further by then, with only 16 families attending the high holiday services, which are the most-attended services on the calendar.

The building was sold to a local community theater organization, where it now serves as the home theater for Olean Community Theater.
