= Jewish-Palestinian Living Room Dialogue Group =

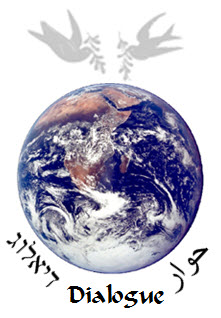
- Formation: July 1992
- Founder: Adham Salem, Nahida Salem, Libby Traubman, Len Traubman
- Purpose: Non-Violent Conflict Resolution and Dialogue
- Location: San Mateo, California
- Website: Official website

The Jewish-Palestinian Living Room Dialogue Group is a non-violent conflict resolution group established in 1992 in San Mateo, California. Its first meeting was held in a local neighborhood residence. As of September 2019, the group remained active and continued to meet monthly in members' homes. The one-to-one, face-to-face method of conflict resolution, modeled by this dialogue group, was increasingly looked to globally by educators, researchers, journalists, activists, trainers, and strategists including the U.S. Department of State, which distributes the dialogue group's instructive films in Africa.

Members of the group have initiated and provided facilitation support at seminars, conferences and youth gatherings, created both printed and video facilitation guidelines, and responded to requests for media interviews. Interest in their work increased in national media during the 2000 Intifada. The group co-founders gave the 2017 Commencement Address at Notre Dame de Namur University,"STORIES OF CHANGE: Creating a Culture of Connection in The Citizens’ Century".

== Beginnings ==
Initial incentive to form the dialogue group came from coexistence models of the 1980s in the Middle East and Africa. Examples are: Neve Shalom ~ Wahat as-Salam (Oasis of Peace), a village where Jewish and Palestinian Israeli families live and learn together, and Koinonia Southern Africa, founded by Reverend Nico Smith during apartheid years, which gathered thousands of Blacks and Whites together to share meals and stories, sometimes in public at risk to their lives. Both initiatives were honored together during the San Francisco 1989 Beyond War Award Ceremony. The word Koinonia means "belonging together" or "communion by intimate participation"

Several members of this dialogue group have deep roots in the principles and educational tradition of the Beyond War movement of the 1980s, which was succeeded by the Foundation for Global Community, the group's first fiscal sponsor. Fiscal oversight support was later provided by the Peninsula Conflict Resolution Center.

In 1991, several of the dialogue group founders, who had worked with the Beyond War Foundation and the Stanford Center on Conflict and Negotiation, brought together Palestinian and Israeli citizen leaders who forged and signed the "Framework for a Public Peace Process" .

== The Living Room Dialogue model ==
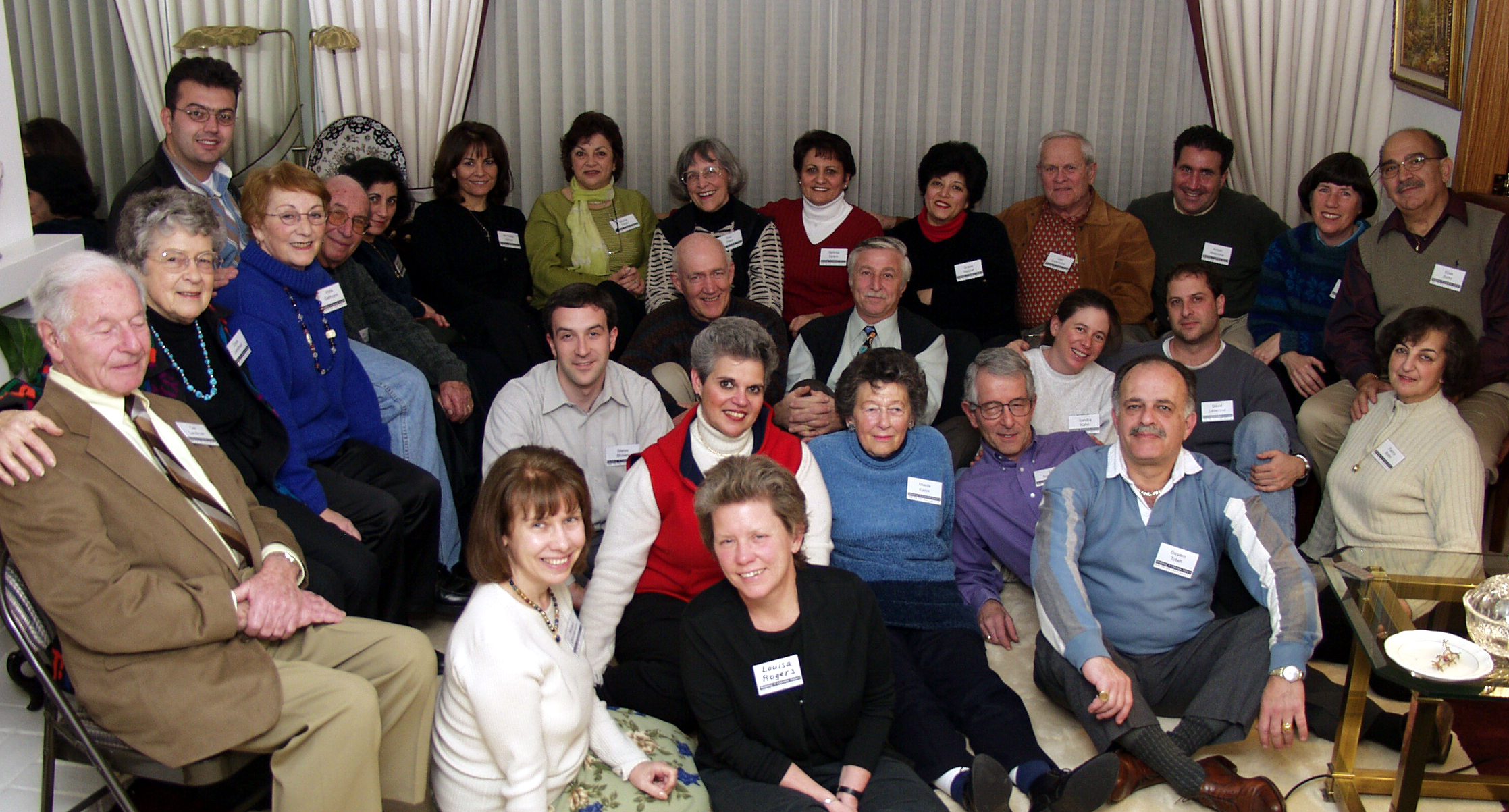
Jewish-Palestinian Living Room Dialogue Group

Engaging in peacebuilding, the early Muslim, Jewish, and Christian women and men participants in the dialogue group were determined to export solutions, rather than import problems. They intended to create a people-intensive—not money-intensive—easily reproducible, in-home model to parallel and complement the government peace process in the Israeli-Palestinian conflict as well as in other regions of the world. By 1993, government negotiators were clarifying their own plea for mandatory citizen participation and the need for the creativity of People-to-People Programs, as found in Annex VI of the 1993 Oslo Accords.

As designed, the living room dialogue group format gives dynamic form to the emerging paradigm of people-centered human security that challenges traditional notions of government-centered national security and is focused on sustained state, regional, and global stability.

== Means of change ==
Change is viewed by the dialogue group in binary terms—a "no" component and a "yes" component. While defining the "no" component—what is wrong, disintegrating, and in need of correction—the dialogue's larger intention is to embody and paint a picture of the "yes," The intent is to focus less on the old and the obsolete—what does not work—and more on modeling the new, the "yes" component that works for the good of all. The dialogue group's ongoing experience is that change begins in small circles of local innovators and Culture Creatives.

The means of Communication to strengthen relationships, release creativity, and effect change is Dialogue, with its quality of Listening for Learning. While the action of dialogue is designed to deepen and enhance circles of relationships, it is not to be mistaken for safe, casual Conversation or adversarial, win-lose Debate. Furthermore, this type of dialogue's contribution to Conflict Transformation is not in Conflict Resolution or Deliberation. Rather this type of dialogue is used to introduce, familiarize, humanize, dignify, and empathize with all the people in the room, so that Conflict Resolution and Deliberation can then take place on a solid foundation. In particular, the dialogue process begins with exploring each person's life narrative, because in many cases "an enemy is one whose story we have not heard". A beneficial outcome of this type of dialogue is a reduction in the widespread humiliation and rankism on Earth as defined by Robert W. Fuller.

This Track II Diplomacy approach is not a quick fix but requires time, and thus is rightfully referred to as Sustained Dialogue, as defined by Dr. Harold H. (Hal) Saunders. Useful practices of this cross-cultural communication continue to improve, drawing from the best of Bohm Dialogue, Interfaith Dialogue, and the ongoing global Dialogue Among Civilizations.

== Activities ==
The contributions made by this dialogue group to the expanding effort to choose conversation over conflict were recognized in the Directory of Arab/Jewish/Palestinian Dialogue Groups published by the Center for Restorative Justice and Peacemaking at the University of Minnesota. Always seeking to expand the network, participants in this Dialogue Group communicate daily face-to-face and by e-mail, telephone, and Skype with citizens worldwide to encourage new groups and provide both graphic and written how-to guidelines (pdf). This dialogue group regularly publishes e-mail reports on the global success stories regarding the expanding public peace process.

=== Creating and Distributing Educational Tools and Instruction Guides ===
The dialogue method draws on the wisdom of Elie Wiesel: "People become the stories they hear and the stories they tell." Dialogue-initiated peacebuilding successes are documented in film and other tools of education that are available for community building. Documents created by the group and freely distributed for use by others include: Palestinian & Jewish Recipes for Peace, Camp Activities for Relationship Building (pdf), The Public Peace Process of Change (pdf), MEETING MOHAMMED: Beginning Jewish-Palestinian Dialogue (pdf), STORY AS ENTRY TO RELATIONSHIP: Teacher's Guide (pdf), ENGAGING THE OTHER: Teacher's Guide (pdf) and also see related Theses and documents of others. The dialogue also maintains a web resource page referencing multi-lingual graphics that can be used by other groups wanting to use dialogue as a communication tool.

=== Dialogue groups launched and supported ===
Many dialogue and relationship-building endeavors continue to be birthed and deepened with assistance from this dialogue group: Building Bridges in Western New York, The Dialogue Project in Brooklyn, The Houston Palestinian-Jewish Dialogue Group, Jewish-Arab Dialogues in Atlanta, Jewish-Palestinian Living Room Dialogue in San Diego, documented in the film, "Talking Peace", West Los Angeles Cousins Club, Monmouth Dialogue Project: Founder Saliba Sarsar, Potlucks for Peace – Ottawa, Arab/Jewish Women's Peace Coalition, Montreal Dialogue Group, and Cousins Club of Palestinians, Jews Seeks Peace.

=== International initiatives and support ===
==== Cameroon ====
Global Compassion

==== Abidjan, Cote d'Ivoire – Ivory Coast ====
Dozos-Guerre Tribal Reconciliation
Albino Citizens' Humanization and Integration

==== Bauchi State of Nigeria ====
Participation by the members of the Forward Action for Conservation of Indigenous Species.(FACIS) in the conference in Jos, Plateau State, Nigeria gave this group the confidence to gather Muslim and Christian men and women for a Dialogue.

==== Jos, Plateau State, Nigeria ====
Dialogue In Nigeria: Muslims and Christians Creating Their Future Together

==== The Republic of Singapore ====
Skype-Facilitated Singapore School Dialogue

=== Additional initiatives supported ===
Intercultural Journeys

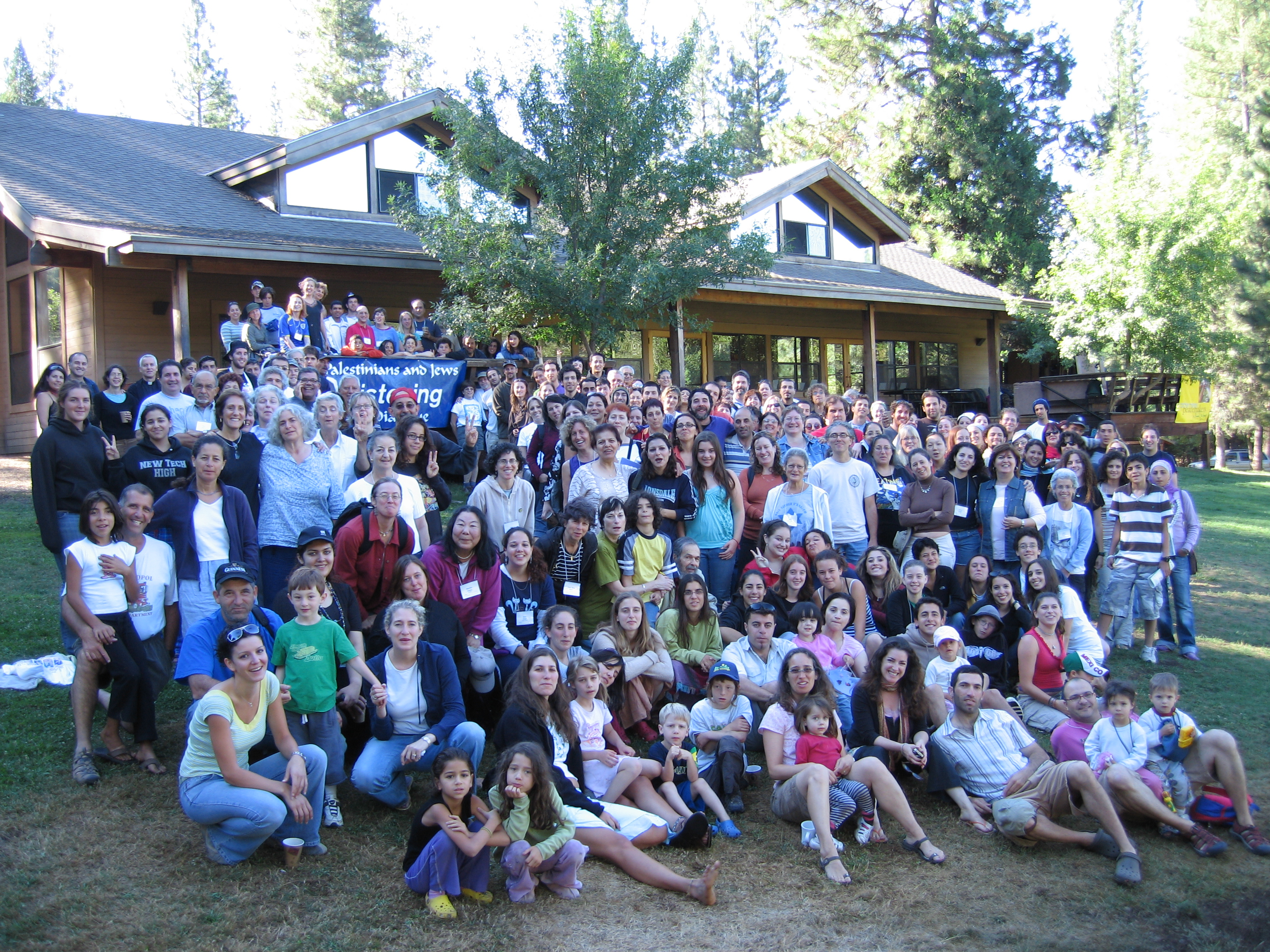
Palestinian-Jewish Family Peacemakers Camp

Palestinian-Jewish Family Peacemakers Camp
From 2003–2007, the dialogue group partnered with Camp Tawonga to bring hundreds of Muslim, Jewish and Christian, elders, adults, and youth from 50 different towns in Palestine and Israel to successfully live together and communicate with each other at the Palestinian-Jewish Family Peacemakers Camp—Oseh Shalom – Sanea al-Salam.

Participants included former armed combatants from both sides of the conflict. The attendees worked together to transcend stereotypes in an effort to dignify one another and demonstrate what peaceful, face to face coexistence looks like. Participants returned to the Middle East to begin or expand their own successful relationship-building initiatives including: Arava Institute for Environmental Studies, Givat Haviva, Interfaith Encounter Association, Combatants for Peace, Neve Shalom~Wahat al-Salam, Nir School of the Heart, Peace Child Israel, and Sulha Peace Project.

== Documentary filmography ==
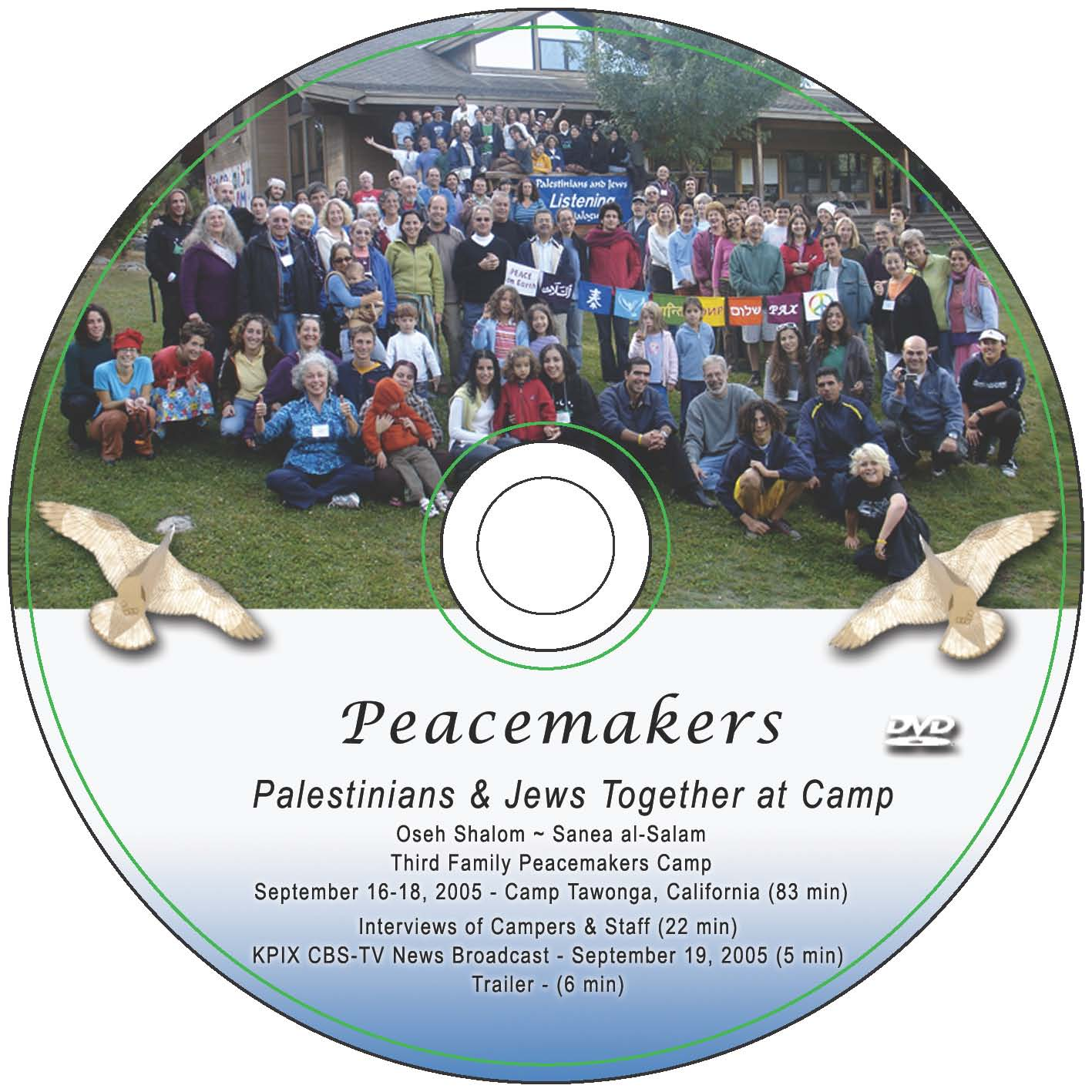
PEACEMAKERS: Palestinians & Jews Together at Camp (2007)

A variety of films document The Dialogue Group's domestic and international experiences. Over 13,000 DVDs have been requested from all continents and every U.S. state including citizens from 2,594 institutions, 2,601 cities, in 82 nations including 20 countries in Africa. Films include:

- PEACEMAKERS: Palestinians & Jews Together at Camp
- DIALOGUE AT WASHINGTON HIGH Tenth grade students follow the example of a Palestinian and a Jew to make new connections.
- CROSSING LINES IN FRESNO In 2009, eighty diverse youth and adults engaged in authentic Dialogue with a new quality of listening to learn. Face to face, they experienced that "an enemy is one whose story we have not heard." This Fresno, California public evening can be replicated anywhere on Earth, as a first step to building community.
- DIALOGUE IN NIGERIA: Muslims & Christians Creating Their Future This award-winning film, documented the 2010 2nd International Conference on Youth and Interfaith Communication in Jos, Nigeria. The film and the conference for 200 diverse African women and men resulted from international collaboration between the New Era Educational and Charitable Support Foundation and the Jewish-Palestinian Living Room Dialogue Group, California, USA. In addition, support from and participation by members of the dialogue group in this effort to dignify and integrate Albinos into the national community can be seen on the banner in the background of the two and one half minute Dote d'Ivoire national newscast.
- 20 YEARS OF PALESTINIAN-JEWISH LIVING ROOM DIALOGUE (1992–2012) This 2012 48-minute, grassroots film archives the 20-year history of the Jewish-Palestinian Living Room Dialogue on the San Francisco Peninsula of northern California, USA. It documents its historic roots in the 1980s, step-by-step beginnings from 1992, projects and progress, both national and international, initiated and guided by a local handful of Muslim, Christian, and Jewish women, men, and youth.
- ABRAHAM'S VISION: Graduation Day! On Sunday June 13, 2010, The University of San Francisco hosted Muslim and Jewish high school students graduating from the year-long Unity Program of Abraham's Vision. Thirty-nine teens had successfully learned about Muslims, Jews, Islam, and Judaism, while strengthening relationships among themselves and with their own communities and religious traditions.

== Books Referencing Activities of the Jewish-Palestinian Living Room Dialogue Group ==
- Beyond Bullets and Bombs - By Judith Kuriansky, Praeger, 2007, p. 128
- Connecting with the Enemy: A Century of Palestinian-Israeli Joint Nonviolence - By Sheila H. Katz, University of Texas Press, 2016, p. 145
- Generating Forgiveness and Constructing Peace Through Truthful Dialogue - by Hilarie Roseman, Dignity Press, 2013, p. 411
- Gutsy Women Win: How to Get Gutsy and Get Going - By Pat Obuchowski, River Grove Books, 2017, p. 47
- Interactive Faith: The Essential Interreligious Community-Building Handbook - By Bud Heckman, Dirk Ficca, Rori Picker Neiss, SkyLight Paths, 2010, p. 226 (Appendix)
- Intergroup Dialogue: Deliberative Democracy in School, College, Community, and Workplace - By David Schoem and Sylvia Hurtado, University of Michigan Press, 2001, p. 349
- Komunikasi: Serba ada serba makna - By Oleh Alo Liliweri, Kencana (Jakarta), 2011, p. 402
- Living Beyond War: A Citizen's Guide - By Winslow Myers, Orbis Books, 2009, p. 137
- No More Enemies - By Deb Reich, Joshua Joshua & Reich, 2011, p. 336
- Race: My Story & Humanity's Bottom Line - By L. Joachin Nile, Universe, 2014, p. 360
- Resolving Community Conflicts and Problems: Public Deliberation and Sustained Dialogue - By Roger A. Lohmann (Editor), Jon Van Til (Editor), Columbia University Press (November 22, 2010), p. 19
- San Mateo County: A Sesquicentennial History - By Mitchell Postel, Star Publishing, 2007 - p. 167
- Social Work with Groups: Social Justice Through Personal, Community, and Societal Change - By N. Sullivan, L. Mitchell, D. Goodman, N.C. Lang, E.S. Mesbur; Routledge, 2002
- Talking Together: Public Deliberation and Political Participation in America - By Lawrence R. Jacobs, Fay Lomax Cook, Michael X. Delli Carpini; Univ of Chicago Press, 2009, p. 141
- The Handbook of Community Practice - By Marie Weil (Editor), Michael S. (Stewart) Reisch (Editor), Mary L. Ohmer (Editor), SAGE Publications, Inc; 2 edition (September 23, 2014), p. 452
- Unity in Diversity: Interfaith Dialogue in the Middle East - By M. Abu-Nimer, A. Khoury, E. Welty, United States Institute of Peace, 2007, p. 8
- You're Not as Crazy as I Thought (But You're Still Wrong): Conversations between a Die-Hard Liberal and a Devoted Conservative - By Phil Neisser and Jacob Z. Hess, Potomac Books. 2016, p. 200
