= Montreal Dialogue Group =

Montreal Dialogue Group is a social justice organization based in Montreal, Quebec, Canada to provide inter-religious dialogues. The Group takes dialogue into the public sphere through sponsorship of programs that celebrate diverse cultures in Montreal.

== History of the organization ==
The Montreal Dialogue Group was founded in January 2003 by Nada Sefian, a Palestinian Muslim born in Lebanon and Ronit Yarosky, a Canadian-Israeli Jew. Before starting the Montreal Dialogue Group, Sefian and Yarosky worked as members of several groups in political activism for the Israel Palestinian conflict. However they found the groups to be inflexible and unable to lead a solution for Arabs and Jews. They left the activist groups and formed the Montreal chapter of Women in Black, a global anti-occupation lobby group that organized weekly anti-occupation "vigils" outside the Israel consulate in Montreal. Sefian and Yarosky found the groups to be unproductive and felt that a new approach was needed to bring the two communities together. In 2003 Sefian and Yarosky organized a talk by Diana Bhuttu, a Palestinian-Canadian lawyer specializing in the Palestinian authority. Around the same time, Sefian was involved in simulating conversation with Jews in a drama therapy conflict resolution workshop at Concordia University. They were convinced of the power of dialogue and this led to the first meeting of Montreal Dialogue Group, in which Sefian, Yarosky, and two Israel-Canadian women participated and shared personal stories. At the second meeting, Yarosky, some fellow Jewish friends as well as Sefian's and some of her Palestinian and Arabic participated; the Arabic-Jewish dialogue began. The Montreal Dialogue Group was also encouraged by the principles and successes of the Jewish-Palestinian Living Room Dialogue Group in California.

== Mission statement ==
The Montreal Dialogue Group brings Canadians of Palestinian, Israelis, Arabs, Muslims, Christians and Jewish identities together in dialogue; listening and sharing communal beliefs, histories and national narratives of each other's identities. Their goal is not to change people's political or religious views, but to build open communications and friendships within and between communities. Participants have common concern over the conflict effecting the Middle East and aim to overcome mistrust and divisiveness from the groups in Canada. The group organizes regular discussion groups and variety of activities through the year to promote peace and demonstrate ways to coexist. The Group's main focus is the Israel/Palestine political issues; the topic includes the one vs. two-state solution, the right of return and Zionism. The Group sometimes covers other topics, such as Jewish and Muslim beliefs and cultures.

== Current activities ==
Public Dialogues: The Public dialogue program is held monthly from September to June. Each meeting starts with a presentation by a member of the group or a guest speaker. It focuses on specific theme each meeting; including politics, religions and cultures. Themes from the past years cover media bias, the right of return, suicide bombing, the peace process, the one vs. two-state solution, two shared religious ceremonies/meals and a Passover Seder. After the presentation, there is a question and commentary time, followed by time for small group discussion to focus on the theme of a more personal basis.

== Past Events ==
The Group organizes a wide variety of activities to bring members from different religious backgrounds into dialogue and to encourage them to learn about and accept other religious communities. Some past examples of public outreach include:

Annual Peace Concert, the first of which, was held at Unitarian Church in May 2007. It was hosted by Jowi Taylor of CBC's "Global Village" and raised over $1.500.

Fun-da-Mental Differences; Middle Eastern Comedy Night was held on November 15, 2006, at AMC Forum Comedy Next. It was presented by comics of Middle Eastern backgrounds; Wafik Nasralla, Rasul Somji, Phil Shuchat, Ryan Wilner, and Dave Merheje. They poked fun at how they have been stereotyped and discriminated because of their Arabic or Muslim background. They, ultimately, appealed that they were "normal" and could laugh like anyone else through the show. This event raised over $3,500.

The Passover Seder was held in April 2005. It was mainly organized by Nada Sefian, Ronit Yarosky, Camela Aigen and Dina Saikali from the Group. In this event, passages from the Torah, the Bible and the Koran was read in order to demonstrate that the three monotheistic religions share a lot in common. Sheila McDonough, a professor of religious studies at Concordia University, was invited to the event as the guest speaker to discuss the rules of Moses and the pharaohs in the Koran.

This event was designed to acknowledge similarities among the three religions and help to build harmony between people from different backgrounds.
The Group planned a summer trip to Israel and the Palestinian Territories in 2005 in which the group would meet with local peace group and activists in both communities. However, the trip was not carried out because they were not able to accept enough participants; for many the cost was unaffordable.

== Organization Structure ==
The Group consists of the Annual General Assembly and the board of directors. The board members are elected at the General Assembly. In 2007, the group reduced the number of board member from nine to seven. Any individual who shares the goal and philosophy of the group can be a member of the Group. The group is always open to new members because the group leaders' policy is to try to involve as many people as possible into the dialogue to share the knowledge and experiences and to create a popular movement for peace and coexistence.

The group started with forty members in 2003 and it has grown to about 30 to 50 attending members at the dialogue sessions and about 50 paid members. Its mailing list includes around 300 people. The membership is diverse with various age groups, ethnic backgrounds and employment statuses.

== Funding ==
In 2007 (April 1, 2006 to March 31, 2007), Montreal Dialogue Organization had revenues of $10,997 and expenses of $11,081. The revenue comes from membership fees, donations, Comedy Night and public meetings.
