= Camp Tawonga =

Youth organization in California

Coordinates: 37.8543°N 119.9500°W

Camp Tawonga is a 160 acres (65 ha) residential Jewish summer camp founded in 1925 located on the middle fork of the Tuolumne River, a few miles west of Yosemite National Park, in the Stanislaus National Forest. The camp operates as a non-profit organization and is affiliated with the Jewish Community Center Association. The camp is located in Groveland, California, although the nearest town is actually a tiny area called Buck Meadows. Tawonga has its main office in San Francisco. Many attendees come from the San Francisco Bay Area, but attendees from Israel, Los Angeles, and other states are often present as well.

== History ==
Camp Tawonga was established by Louis and Emma Blumenthal in 1925, initially as separate camps known as Camp Kelowa for Boys and Singing Trail for Girls at Huntington Lake. The camps were located in the High Sierras, just below the alpine level at 7,000 feet, 65 miles Northeast of Fresno. The camps were closed for several years during the Second World War. Camp Tawonga moved to its current site on the middle fork of the Tuolumne River in 1963.

From 2003 to 2007, Camp Tawonga ran the Oseh Shalom-Sanea al Salam—the Palestinian-Jewish Family Peacemakers Camp—in cooperation with the Jewish-Palestinian Living Room Dialogue.

On July 3, 2013, a tree fell at the camp, killing an Arts and Crafts specialist and injuring several others as campers were evacuated to the girls' side field. In August 2013, the camp was in the path of the Rim Fire. After the camp was evacuated, a staff member returned to the camp to rescue a Torah scroll which had previously survived the Holocaust. The camp lost three buildings to the fire; other damage was described as repairable and is now rebuilt.

On July 31, 2018, just two days into the last summer session of the year, all of Camp Tawonga evacuated due to dangerous air quality caused by the local Ferguson Fire and the firefighters' "back burning" techniques. In the summer of 2019, Camp Tawonga became one of the first summer camps in the United States to offer all-gender cabins. In 2020, the camp procured a replacement Torah scroll from the former B'Nai Israel synagogue in Olean, New York. On July 15, 2021, a counselor named Eli Kane died from drowning off-site while working at the camp.

== Facility ==
Camp Tawonga's facility supports roughly 500 attendees and staff, with about 2,000 attendees and staff participating each year. There are around 30 rustic-style cabins without electricity, running water, or heating, used for campers in the summer. There are around 20 heated or powered cabins that are used for other guests. There is a lodge-style dining hall equipped with a Kosher kitchen and back porch overlooking a lake. An Arts-and-Crafts shed, Olympic sized swimming pool, team building ropes course, and outdoor amphitheater are just some of Tawonga's many on-site buildings.

Among its programs are an LGBTQ family weekend (Camp Keshet), the only such program in the country.

== Cultural references ==
- Steve Almond has written about his experiences at the camp in his works, including in the book (Not That You Asked) Rants, Exploits and Obsessions (2007).
- Flashback photographs in the film Heathers (1988) depict characters wearing Camp Tawonga merchandise.
- The original filmA Visit to Camp Kelowa and Singing Trail (1936) was produced by Louis and Emma Blumenthal and can be found in the Louis and Emma Blumenthal Papers on Internet Archive.
- Jake Brooks, the current CEO and co-founder of Triumph Labs, worked as staff at the camp during the summer of 2017.

== See also ==
- List of summer camps
