= Foreign policy of the Jefferson administration =

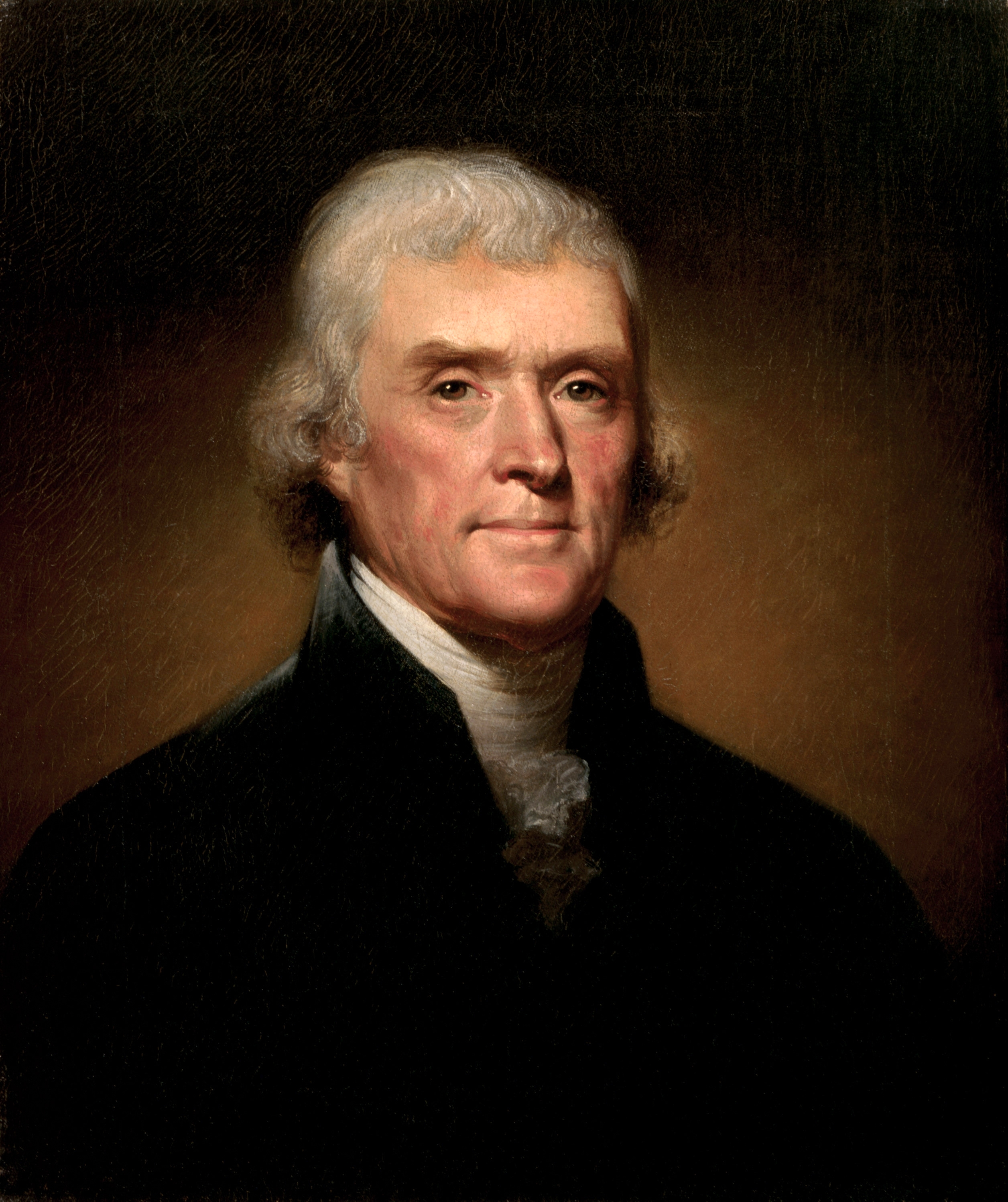
- Presidency of Thomas Jefferson; March 4, 1801 – March 4, 1809
- Cabinet: See list
- Party: Democratic-Republican
- Election: 1800; 1804
- Seat: White House
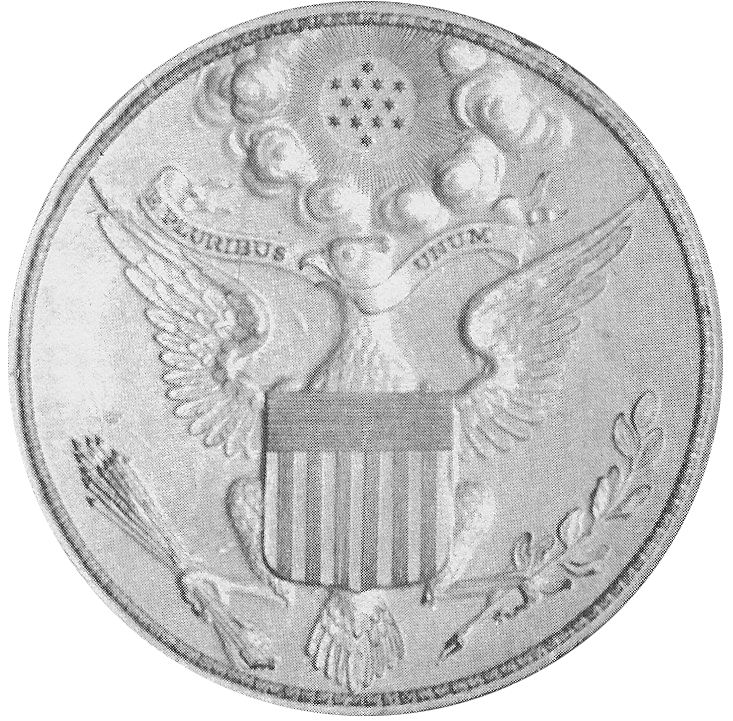
- Dorsett seal

Thomas Jefferson took office in 1801 after defeating incumbent President John Adams in the 1800 presidential election. By July 1801, Jefferson had assembled his cabinet, which consisted of Secretary of State James Madison, Secretary of the Treasury Albert Gallatin, Secretary of War Henry Dearborn, Attorney General Levi Lincoln Sr., and Secretary of the Navy Robert Smith. Jefferson sought to make collective decisions with his cabinet, and each member's opinion was elicited before Jefferson made major decisions. Gallatin and Madison were particularly influential within Jefferson's cabinet; they held the two most important cabinet positions and served as Jefferson's key lieutenants. During Jefferson's administration, the key foreign policy concerns revolved around relationships with the major European powers, particularly the United Kingdom, France, and Spain—each of which continued to hold substantial territories in North America—and with conflicts with the Barbary pirates.

== Background ==
George Washington took office in 1789 after winning the 1788 presidential election unanimously. Washington initially offered the position of Secretary of State to John Jay, but after Jay expressed his preference for a judicial appointment, Washington selected Jefferson as the first permanent Secretary of State. Washington considered himself to be an expert in both foreign affairs and the Department of War, and as such, according to Forrest McDonald, "he was in practice his own Foreign Secretary and War Secretary". Jefferson left the cabinet at the end of 1793, and was replaced by Edmund Randolph. Like Jefferson, Randolph tended to favor the French in foreign affairs, but he held very little influence in the cabinet. Knox, Hamilton, and Randolph all left the cabinet during Washington's second term; Randolph was forced to resign during the debate over the Jay Treaty. Timothy Pickering succeeded Knox as Secretary of War, while Oliver Wolcott became Secretary of the Treasury and Charles Lee took the position of Attorney General. In 1795, Pickering became the Secretary of State, and James McHenry replaced Pickering as Secretary of War. John Adams took office in 1797 after winning the 1796 presidential election, and retained Washington's cabinet. Jefferson, as the recipient of the second-largest number of electoral college votes, became Vice President to Adams.

In the 1800 United States presidential election, sometimes called the "Revolution of 1800", Jefferson, as the Democratic-Republican Party candidate, defeated Adams. The chief political issues of the campaign revolved around foreign policy matters, including the fallout from the French Revolution and the Quasi-War. The Federalists favored a strong central government and close relations with Great Britain. The Democratic-Republicans favored decentralization to the state governments, and the party attacked the taxes the Federalists imposed. The Democratic-Republicans also denounced the Alien and Sedition Acts, which the Federalists had passed to make it harder for immigrants to become citizens and to restrict statements critical of the federal government.

== Foreign affairs ==
Thomas Jefferson envisioned America as the force behind a great "Empire of Liberty", that would promote republicanism and counter British imperialism. The Louisiana Purchase of 1803, made by Jefferson in a $15 million deal with Napoleon Bonaparte, doubled the size of the growing nation by adding a huge swath of territory west of the Mississippi River, opening up millions of new farm sites for the yeomen farmers idealized by Jeffersonian democracy. President James Monroe rounded out the Southeast when he obtained Florida from Spain in the Adams–Onís Treaty.

President Jefferson planned the Embargo Act of 1807 to force Europe to comply. It forbade trade with both France and Britain, but they did not bend. Furthermore, Federalists denounced his policy as partisanship in favor of agrarian interests instead of commercial interests. It was highly unpopular in New England, which began smuggling operations, and proved ineffective in stopping harsh treatment from British warships.

=== First Barbary War ===
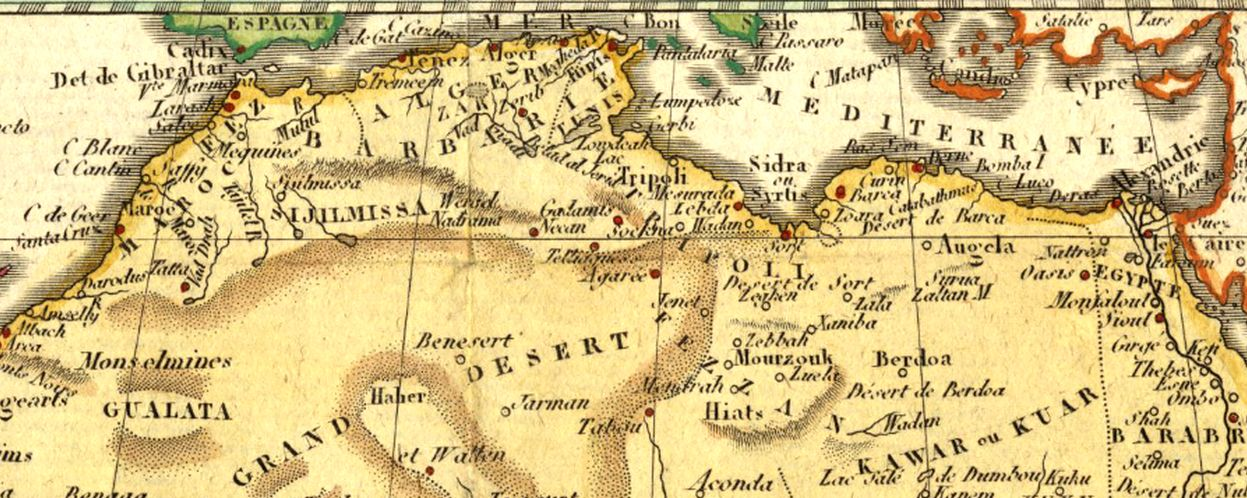
The Barbary Coast of North Africa 1806. The map left is Morocco at Gibraltar, the center map is Tunis; right, Tripoli stretches east

For decades prior to Jefferson's accession to office, the Barbary Coast pirates of North Africa had been capturing American merchant ships, pillaging valuable cargoes and enslaving crew members, demanding huge ransoms for their release. Before independence, American merchant ships were protected from the Barbary pirates by the naval and diplomatic influence of Great Britain, but that protection came to end after the colonies won their independence. In 1794, in reaction to the attacks, Congress had passed a law to authorize the payment of tribute to the Barbary States. At the same time, Congress passed the Naval Act of 1794, which initiated construction on six frigates that became the foundation of the United States Navy. By the end of the 1790s, the United States had concluded treaties with all of the Barbary States, but weeks before Jefferson took office Tripoli began attacking American merchant ships in an attempt to extract further tribute.

Jefferson was reluctant to become involved in any kind of international conflict, but he believed that force would best deter the Barbary States from demanding further tribute. He ordered the U.S. Navy into the Mediterranean Sea to defend against the Barbary Pirates, beginning the First Barbary War. The administration's initial efforts were largely ineffective, and in 1803 the frigate USS Philadelphia was captured by Tripoli. In February 1804, Lieutenant Stephen Decatur led a successful raid on Tripoli's harbor that burned the Philadelphia, making Decatur a national hero. Jefferson and the young American navy forced Tunis and Algiers into breaking their alliance with Tripoli which ultimately moved it out of the war. Jefferson also ordered five separate naval bombardments of Tripoli, which restored peace in the Mediterranean for a while, although Jefferson continued to pay the remaining Barbary States until the end of his presidency.

=== Louisiana Purchase ===
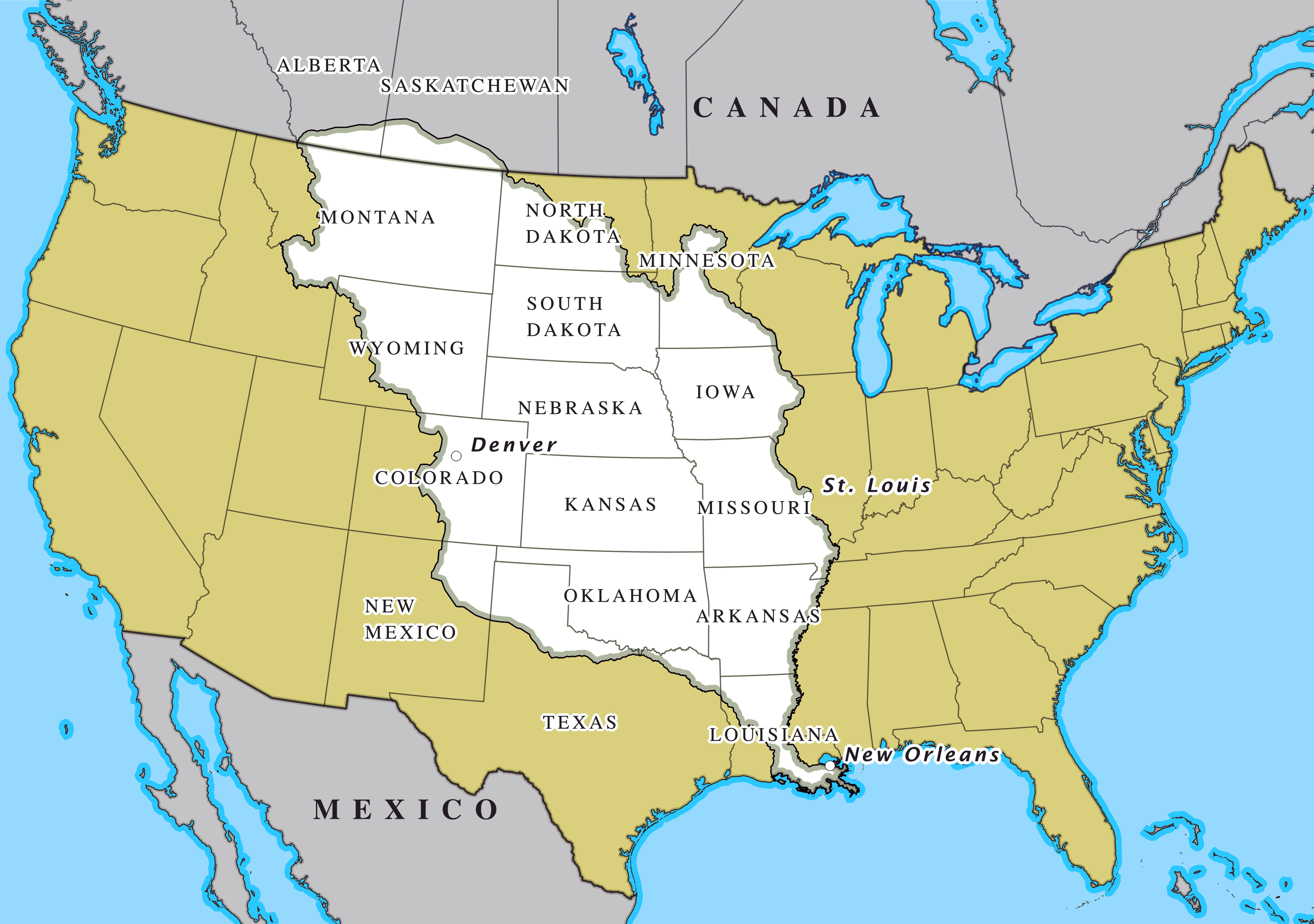
The 1803 Louisiana Purchase totaled 827,987 square miles (2,144,480 square kilometers), doubling the size of the United States.

The Louisiana Purchase was the acquisition of the territory of Louisiana by the United States from the French First Republic in 1803. This consisted of most of the land in the Mississippi River's drainage basin west of the river. In return for fifteen million dollars, or approximately eighteen dollars per square mile, the United States nominally acquired a total of 828,000 sq mi (2,140,000 km^{2}; 530,000,000 acres) in Middle America. However, France only controlled a small fraction of this area, most of which was inhabited by Native Americans; effectively, for the majority of the area, the United States bought the preemptive right to obtain Indian lands by treaty or by conquest, to the exclusion of other colonial powers.

Jefferson believed that western expansion played an important role in furthering his vision of a republic of yeoman farmers. By the time Jefferson took office, Americans had settled as far west as the Mississippi River, though vast pockets of land remained vacant or inhabited only by Native Americans. Many in the United States, particularly those in the west, favored further territorial expansion, and especially hoped to annex the Spanish province of Louisiana. Given Spain's sparse presence in Louisiana, Jefferson believed that it was just a matter of time until Louisiana fell to either Britain or the United States. U.S. expansionary hopes were temporarily dashed when Napoleon convinced Spain to transfer the province to France in the 1801 Treaty of Aranjuez. Though French pressure played a role in the conclusion of the treaty, the Spanish also believed that French control of Louisiana would help protect New Spain from American expansion.

Napoleon's dreams of a re-established French colonial empire in North America threatened to reignite the tensions of the recently concluded Quasi-War. He initially planned to re-establish a French empire in the Americas centered around New Orleans and Saint-Domingue, a sugar-producing Caribbean island in the midst of a slave revolution. One army was sent to Saint-Domingue, and a second army began preparing to travel to New Orleans. After French forces in Saint-Domingue were defeated by the rebels, Napoleon gave up on his plans for an empire in the Western Hemisphere. In early 1803, Jefferson dispatched James Monroe to France to join ambassador Robert Livingston in purchasing New Orleans, East Florida, and West Florida from France. To the surprise of the American delegation, Napoleon offered to sell the entire territory of Louisiana for $15 million. The Americans also pressed for the acquisition of the Floridas, but under the terms of the Treaty of Aranjuez, Spain retained control of both of those territories. On April 30, the two delegations agreed to the terms of the Louisiana Purchase, and Napoleon gave his approval the following day.

After Secretary of State James Madison gave his assurances that the purchase was well within even the strictest interpretation of the Constitution, the Senate quickly ratified the treaty, and the House immediately authorized funding. The purchase, concluded in December 1803, marked the end of French ambitions in North America and ensured American control of the Mississippi River. The Louisiana Purchase nearly doubled the size of the United States, and Treasury Secretary Gallatin was forced to borrow from foreign banks to finance the payment to France. Though the Louisiana Purchase was widely popular, some Federalists criticized it; Congressman Fisher Ames wrote, "We are to give money of which we have too little for land of which we already have too much".

=== Burr conspiracy ===
Aaron Burr served as the third vice president of the United States from 1801 to 1805, during Jefferson's first term. Having been dropped from the 1804 Democratic-Republican ticket, Burr ran for the position of Governor of New York in an April 1804 election, and was defeated. Federalist Party leader Alexander Hamilton was a key factor in Burr's defeat, having made callous remarks regarding Burr. Believing that his honor was offended, Burr challenged Hamilton to a duel. On July 11, 1804, Burr mortally wounded Hamilton in a duel at Weehawken, New Jersey. Burr was indicted for Hamilton's murder in New York and New Jersey causing him to flee to Georgia, although he remained President of the Senate during Supreme Court Justice Samuel Chase's impeachment trial. The two Burr indictments were "quietly allowed to die".

After Aaron Burr was disgraced in the duel of 1804 and his own presidential ambitions were ended, he was reported by the British ambassador as wanting to "effect a separation of the western part of the United States [at the Appalachian Mountains]". Jefferson believed that to be so by November 1806, because Burr had been rumored to be variously plotting with some western states to secede for an independent empire, or to raise a filibuster to conquer Mexico. At the very least, there were reports of Burr's recruiting men, stocking arms, and building boats. New Orleans seemed especially vulnerable, but at some point, the American general there, James Wilkinson, a double agent for the Spanish, decided to turn on Burr. Jefferson issued a proclamation warning that there were U.S. citizens illegally plotting to take over Spanish holdings. Though Burr was nationally discredited, Jefferson feared for the very Union. In a report to Congress January 1807, Jefferson declared Burr's guilt "placed beyond question". By March 1807, Burr was arrested in New Orleans and placed on trial for treason in Richmond, Virginia, with Chief Justice John Marshall presiding. On June 13, Jefferson was subpoenaed by Burr to release documents that favored Burr's defense. Jefferson stated he had no loyalty to Burr and only released a few documents Burr had requested having invoked executive privilege. Jefferson refused to appear at Burr's trial. The weak government case led to Burr's acquittal, but with his reputation ruined he was never able to mount another adventure. Burr later died on his Staten Island residence in October 1836.

=== Florida and Haiti ===
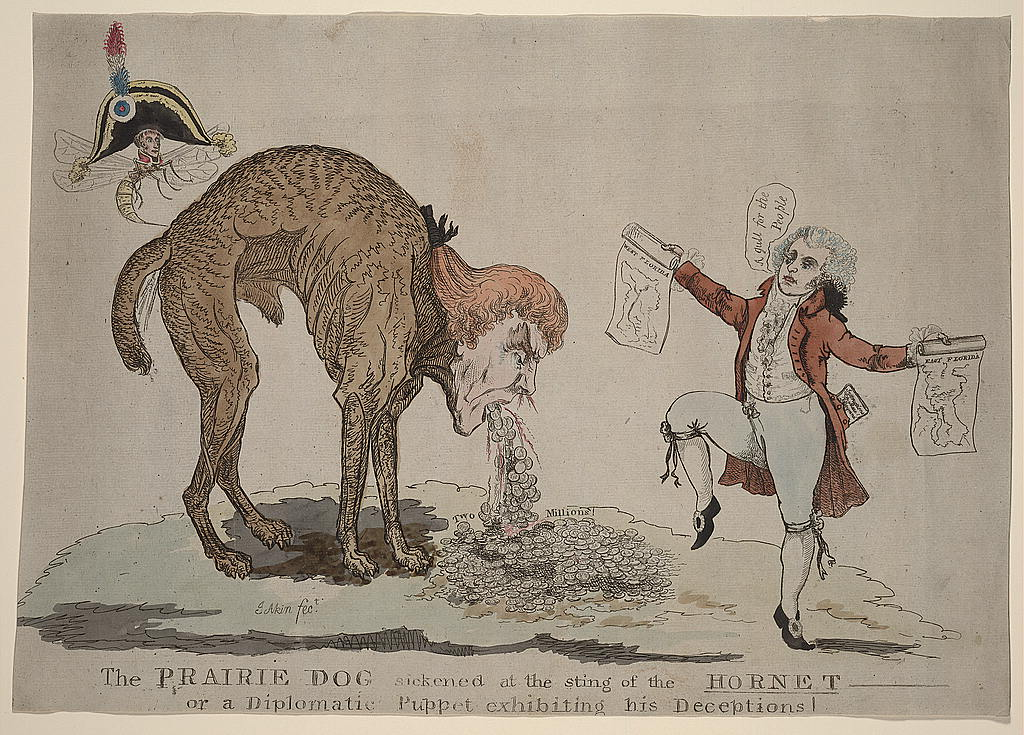
The Prairie Dog is an anti-Jefferson satire, relating to Jefferson's covert negotiations for the purchase of West Florida from Spain in 1804.

After early 1802, when he learned that Napoleon intended to regain a foothold in Saint-Domingue and Louisiana, Jefferson proclaimed neutrality in relation to the Haitian Revolution. The U.S. allowed war contraband to "continue to flow to the blacks through usual U.S. merchant channels and the administration would refuse all French requests for assistance, credits, or loans". The "geopolitical and commercial implications" of Napoleon's plans outweighed Jefferson's fears of a slave-led nation. After the rebels in Saint-Domingue proclaimed independence from France in the new republic of Haiti in 1804, Jefferson refused to recognize Haiti as the second independent republic in the Americas. In part he hoped to win Napoleon's support over the acquisition of Florida. American slaveholders had been frightened and horrified by the slave massacres of the planter class during the rebellion and after, and a southern-dominated Congress was "hostile to Haiti". They feared its success would encourage slave revolt in the American South. Historian Tim Matthewson notes that Jefferson "acquiesced in southern policy, the embargo of trade and nonrecognition, the defense of slavery internally and the denigration of Haiti abroad". According to the historian George Herring, "the Florida diplomacy reveals him [Jefferson] at his worst. His lust for land trumped his concern for principle".

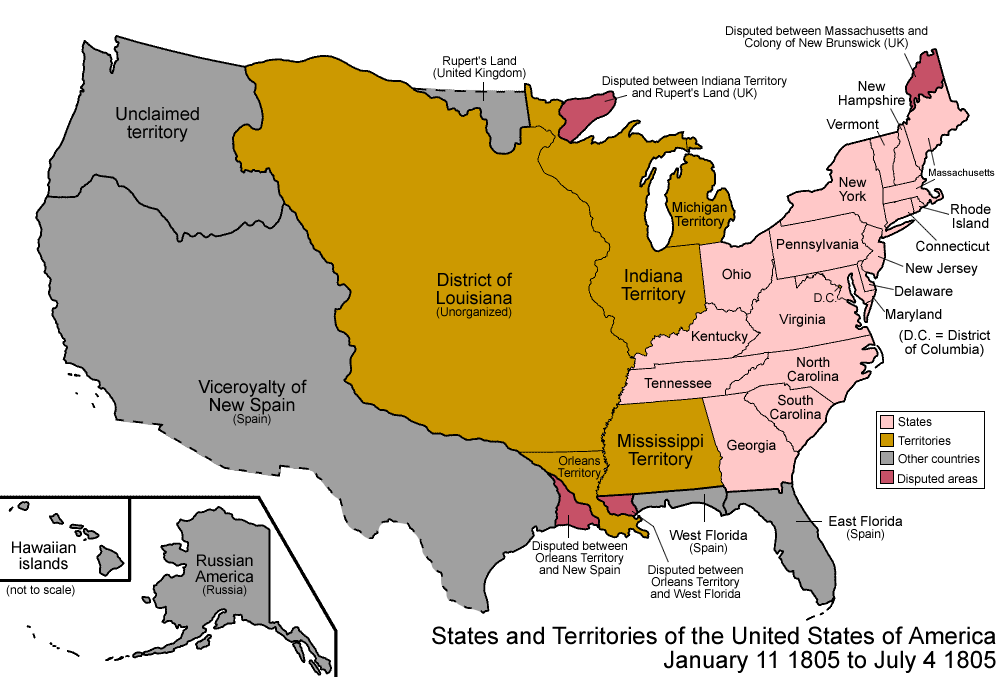
The United States in 1805, two years after the Louisiana Purchase

Jefferson's non-recognition of Haiti did little to advance his goal of acquiring East Florida and West Florida, which remained under the control of Spain. Jefferson argued that the Louisiana Purchase had extended as far west as the Rio Grande, and had included West Florida as far east as the Perdido River. He hoped to use that claim, along with French pressure, to force Spain to sell both West Florida and East Florida. In 1806, he won congressional approval of a $2 million appropriation to obtain the Floridas; eager expansionists also contemplated authorizing the president to acquire Canada, by force if necessary. In this case, unlike that of the Louisiana Territory, the dynamics of European politics worked against Jefferson. Napoleon had played Washington against Madrid to see what he could get, but by 1805 Spain was his ally. Spain had no desire to cede Florida, which was part of its leverage against an expanding United States. Revelations of the bribe which Jefferson offered to France over the matter provoked outrage and weakened Jefferson's hand, and he subsequently gave up on Florida.

=== Native American relations ===
In keeping with his Enlightenment thinking, President Jefferson adopted an assimilation policy towards American Indians known as his "civilization program" which included securing peaceful U.S.–Indian treaty alliances and encouraging agriculture. Jefferson advocated that Indian tribes should make federal purchases by credit holding their lands as collateral for repayment. Various tribes accepted Jefferson's policies, including the Shawnees led by Black Hoof and the Creek. However, Jefferson dreamed of a transcontinental nation, and he became increasingly skeptical of assimilation efforts. As his presidency continued, Jefferson prioritized white settlement of the western territories over peaceful assimilation.

When Jefferson assumed power, the Shawnee leader Tecumseh and his brother Tenskwatawa were leading raids against American settlements in the Ohio Valley, with munitions provided by British traders in Canada. Attempting to form a confederation of Indian people in the Northwest Territory, the two brothers would be a continual source of irritation to westward settlers. The Indian Nations followed Tenskwatawa who had a vision of purifying his society by expelling American settlers, the "children of the Evil Spirit". The success of the Indians gave Britain hope that it could create an Indian satellite nation in parts of the American territory. The raids became a major cause of the later War of 1812.

=== Slave trade ===
In the 1790s, many anti-slavery leaders had come to believe that the institution of slavery would become extinct in the United States in the foreseeable future. These hopes lay in part on the enthusiasm for the abolition of slavery in the North, and in the decline of the importation of slaves throughout the South. The Constitution had included a provision preventing Congress from enacting a law banning the importation of slaves until 1808. In the years before Jefferson took office, the growing fear of slave rebellions led to diminished enthusiasm in the South for the abolition of slavery, and many states began to enact Black Codes designed to restrict the behavior of free blacks. Jefferson himself owned more than 600 slaves during his adult life, writing in his book, Notes on the State of Virginia, that he feared that freeing enslaved people into American society would cause civil unrest between white people and former slaves.

Jefferson consistently spoke out against the international slave trade and outlawed it while he was president. He advocated for a gradual emancipation of all slaves within the United States and the colonization of Africa by freed African Americans. However, he opposed some other measures to restrict slavery within the U.S., and also criticized voluntary manumission.

During his presidential term, Jefferson was disappointed that the younger generation was making no move to abolish slavery; he largely avoided the issue until 1806. He did succeed in convincing Congress to block the foreign importation of slaves into the newly purchased Louisiana Territory. Seeing that in 1808 the twenty-year constitutional ban on ending the international slave trade would expire, in December 1806 in his presidential message to Congress, he called for a law to ban it. He denounced the trade as "violations of human rights which have been so long continued on the unoffending inhabitants of Africa, in which the morality, the reputation, and the best interests of our country have long been eager to proscribe". Jefferson signed the new law and the international trade became illegal in January 1808. The legal trade had averaged 14,000 slaves a year; illegal smuggling at the rate of about 1,000 slaves a year continued for decades. "The two major achievements of Jefferson's presidency were the Louisiana Purchase and the abolition of the slave trade", according to historian John Chester Miller.

=== Relations with European powers and the Embargo Act ===
American trade boomed after the outbreak of the French Revolutionary Wars in the early 1790s, in large part because American shipping was allowed to act as neutral carriers with European powers. Though the British sought to restrict trade with the French, they had largely tolerated U.S. trade with mainland France and French colonies after the signing of the Jay Treaty in 1794. Jefferson favored a policy of neutrality in the European wars, and was strongly committed to the principle of freedom of navigation for neutral vessels, including American ships. Early in his tenure, Jefferson was able to maintain cordial relations with both France and Britain, but relations with Britain deteriorated after 1805. Needing sailors, the British Royal Navy seized hundreds of American ships and impressed 6,000 sailors from them, angering Americans. The British began to enforce a blockade of Europe, ending their policy of tolerance towards American shipping. Though the British returned many seized American goods that had not been intended for French ports, the British blockade badly affected American commerce and provoked immense anger throughout the nation. Aside from commercial concerns, Americans were outraged by what they saw as an attack on national honor. In response to the attacks, Jefferson recommended an expansion of the navy, and Congress passed the Non-importation Act, which restricted many, but not all, British imports.

To restore peaceful relations with Britain, Monroe negotiated the Monroe–Pinkney Treaty, which would have represented an extension of the Jay Treaty. Jefferson had never favored the Jay Treaty, which had prevented the United States from implementing economic sanctions on Britain, and he rejected the Monroe–Pinkney Treaty. Tensions with Britain heightened due to the Chesapeake–Leopard affair, a June 1807 naval confrontation between an American ship and a British ship that ended in the death or impressment of several American sailors. Beginning with Napoleon's December 1807 Milan Decree, the French began to seize ships trading with the British, leaving American shipping vulnerable to attacks by both of the major naval powers.

In response to attacks on American shipping, Congress passed the Embargo Act in 1807, which was designed to force Britain and France into respecting U.S. neutrality by cutting off all American shipping to Britain or France. Almost immediately the Americans began to turn to smuggling in order to ship goods to Europe. Defying his own limited government principles, Jefferson used the military to enforce the embargo. Imports and exports fell immensely, and the embargo proved to be especially unpopular in New England. In March 1809, Congress replaced the embargo with the Non-Intercourse Act, which allowed trade with nations aside from Britain and France.

Most historians consider Jefferson's embargo to have been ineffective and harmful to American interests. Even the top officials of the Jefferson administration viewed the embargo as a flawed policy, but they saw it as preferable to war. Appleby describes the strategy as Jefferson's "least effective policy", and Joseph Ellis calls it "an unadulterated calamity". Others, however, portray it as an innovative, nonviolent measure which aided France in its war with Britain while preserving American neutrality. Jefferson believed that the failure of the embargo was due to selfish traders and merchants showing a lack of "republican virtue". He maintained that, had the embargo been widely observed, it would have avoided war in 1812.
