= Peninsula Conflict Resolution Center =

The Peninsula Conflict Resolution Center (PCRC), founded in 1986, is a nonprofit organization that serves individuals, groups, and organizations in San Mateo County, California. As a neutral third party, PCRC assists people in conflict to develop mutually acceptable agreements. It offers mediation, facilitation, training, and community building services. It is the largest provider of community-based conflict management and prevention services in San Mateo County.

== Mission ==
The Peninsula Conflict Resolution Center's mission is to promote collaboration and active engagement in the communities it serves.

== Mediation ==
PCRC's community mediation program is available for free or low cost to everyone who lives or works in San Mateo County. With the help of approximately 160 trained volunteer mediators, PCRC handles over 500 mediation cases and conducts approximately 150 mediations per year.

Typical issues resolved in the community mediation program are: neighbor disputes about noise, fences, parking and yard/tree maintenance; landlord/tenant conflicts; disagreements between a consumer and a business; workplace disputes; and other interpersonal situations.

== Facilitation ==
Through its facilitation services, PCRC helps organizations plan and run meetings. When facilitating a meeting, PCRC seeks to promote participation, support dialogue in communities, aid decision making, and help groups work productively.

Some situations in which PCRC provides facilitation services include organizations that need to develop a strategic plan, public meetings in which neighbors come together to share concerns and ideas, staff or work groups who want to work out a conflict, organizational retreats, and city government public participation processes.

Unlike most of PCRC's services, facilitation usually requires a fee.

== Training ==
PCRC offers workshops to groups and organizations, training participants in communication and conflict resolution skills.

== Civic engagement ==
The Civic Engagement Initiative, begun in 1997, is designed to increase residents' active involvement in their communities, schools, and democracy. Civic engagement can take many forms, including volunteering, voting, community organizing, mentoring, running for public office, and public dialogue. The Civic Engagement Initiative seeks to build a sense of ownership and interconnectedness in communities and to help individuals understand that their participation matters.

Through the Civic Engagement Initiative, PCRC promotes parent involvement in schools, facilitates dialogues on public issues, trains community leaders, partners with community agencies and links residents to public policy makers.

As an expression of its global vision, PCRC also sponsors the local Jewish-Palestinian Living Room Dialogue with its domestic effectiveness and global impact.
