= Beyond War =

Movement for peace

Beyond War (distinct from World Beyond War) is a movement founded in 1984. It seeks to end war, on the premise that, in the broad view, the continued practice of war will ultimately lead to a global catastrophe.

== Aims ==
Beyond War aims to end war by addressing the psychological and philosophical roots of human war making behaviors in preference to political causes. It is based on the observation credited to Albert Einstein: "With the unleashed power of the atom, everything has changed, save our modes of thinking, and thus we drift towards unparalleled catastrophe". Beyond War sprang into being during the early 1980s in the Palo Alto area of California, among a group drawing primarily from academia, the computer industry and marketing. From the very start, the Beyond War group strongly held the conviction that "Life is at a crossroads. One direction leads to death, destruction, and possibly the extinction of life on earth. The other direction opens new possibilities for the human species; a world where all people have the opportunity to satisfy their basic human needs, where life has meaning and purpose." Due to this sense of imminent, climactic danger, the principle of commitment is foundational to the movement, in which leaders and serious volunteers have taken time off from their work to give a year or two of full-time volunteer help.

Fanning out across the United States and a number countries including Canada, England, Sweden, Israel, and Germany, the Beyond War volunteer coordinators brought with them the "Interest Evening" and "Orientation" presentations. Employing an array of video, literary, philosophical, religious and marketing psychology approaches, the introductory "Interest Evening" culminates with the famously simple but effective "BBs demonstration". In this, the presenter, having described in graphic detail the devastating effect of a single thermonuclear detonation on a modern city, asks the participants to close their eyes and listen as 10,000 BBs, representing each of the 10,000 thermonuclear devices in the world, are poured into a large tin bucket. Participants, often visibly shaken, are typically asked to commit to a six-part vow "to build a world beyond war". The vows are divided into three guiding principles and three core practices.

== Principles and practices ==
The guiding principles are:

1. War is obsolete;
2. We are one on this planet;
3. The means are the ends in the making.

The core practices are:

1. I will resolve conflict. I will not use violence;
2. I will maintain an attitude of good will. I will not preoccupy myself with an enemy;
3. I will work together with others to build a world beyond war.

In all these principles, the Beyond War movement remains notable for its ability to remain staunchly non-partisan politically, and non-sectarian in the religious sense. In keeping with its global perspective, it attempts, with varying but generally substantial degrees of success, to avoid identification with any nation, political ideology, religious creed etc. The aim is to be inclusive due to the guiding principle #2—"We are one on this planet".

After the collapse of the Soviet Union, and the widespread perception that the threat of nuclear war was no longer imminent and the essential goals of Beyond War had been met, the founders met and decided to radically expand the goals of the movement. It was to become even more inclusive and the name was changed to Global Community, with a very philosophical and internationalist leaning, also embracing environmental and social concerns not originally found in the single minded concern with war and weapons of planetary scale mass destruction. This meeting was held without consulting the 24,000 membership worldwide, who were spectators on the sidelines of the momentous events of the years between 1989 and 2001, which included the breakup of Soviet communism, the first Gulf War and the September 11 attacks.

However, with concern mounting about the direction of the "war on terror", and boosted by a certain amount of outrage at the second U.S. led assault on Iraq, taking place in March 2003, a group of long time Beyond War/Global Community members based in Portland and Eugene, Oregon, were roused to action. They had come to the conclusion that the goals of the original movement had not been met and that the danger of a global Armageddon had actually increased since the rise of the "war on terror" and the failure of the U.S. and Russia to continue to dismantle nuclear weapons below the level 7,000. With the full cooperation and assistance of the Global Community Board, the curriculum was updated and the use of web based technology adopted. By 2009, the membership had returned to approximately 2,000.

== Framework for a Public Peace Process ==
The Beyond War Foundation and Stanford University Center on Conflict and Negotiation worked together to bring to the California redwoods Palestinian and Israeli citizens leaders who then forged and signed the historic Framework for a Public Peace Process document. By 1993, government negotiators were clarifying their own plea for mandatory citizen relationships and creativity of People-to-People Programs in Annex VI of the 1993 Oslo Accords. The 1991 Framework immediately inspired the 1992 birth of the sustained Jewish-Palestinian Living Room Dialogue Group in the United States.

== Award Ceremonies ==
The Beyond War Award was created in 1983 and ran for eight years (1983–1990) to honor the great efforts of humankind as it moves to build a world beyond war. The award attracted national and international attention through the nominating and selection process.

- Second Beyond War Award Ceremony 1984. The International Physicians for the Prevention of Nuclear War received the second Beyond War Award. It was presented to the co-founders, Dr. Bernard Lown of the US and Dr. Yevgeni Chazov of the USSR, simultaneously through the use of a live satellite teleconference link or "spacebridge" between Moscow and San Francisco. This historic event was viewed live by over 75,000 people. Over 100 million Soviets subsequently saw the televised videotape. (Free Video at Archive.org.)
- Third Beyond War Award Ceremony 1985. The Beyond War Foundation presented its award to six world leaders, President Miguel de la Madrid in Mexico, President Raúl Alfonsín of Argentina, Prime Minister Olof Palme in Sweden, First President Julius Nyerere (now retired) in Tanzania, Prime Minister Andreas Papandreou in Greece and Prime Minister Rajiv Gandhi in India, each in his respective country, at the same time on two-way television so they could all see and hear each other, and so the world could look on.
