= Albert Malet =

Albert Malet may refer to:

- Albert Malet (historian) (1864–1915), French historian and author of scholarly textbooks
- Albert Malet (painter) (1912–1986), French painter of the Rouen school
