= Shikand-gumanig Vizar =

Zoroastrian theology book of 9th century Iran

Shikand-gumanig Vizar (also called Shikand-gumanik Vichar and abbreviated as SGV) is a Zoroastrian theology book of 9th century Iran, written by Mardan-Farrukh. Part apologetics, part polemic, the book was composed when Zoroastrians endured a perilous status as a harassed and declining minority. Its author discusses several neighboring religions, hence it contains nascent elements of an academic discipline: comparative religion. This article includes a description and analysis of the text, and also briefly addresses its context and relevance, with respect to other religions and to the continuing traditions of Zoroastrianism.

== The Author ==
What little is known of the person Mardan-Farrukh (Martānfarrux-i Ohrmazddātān) comes to us through the pages of his book, written in Middle Iranian using the Pahlavi script. Its title Shkand-Gumanik Vichar has been rendered Analytical Treatise for the Dispelling of Doubts, or Decisive Solution for Doubts. A published text, as translated into English, runs 135 pages.

The Muslim conquest of his native Persia was completed by 651 C.E. Based on references made in his book to the then editions of other Zoroastrian works (e.g., the Dinkart), Mardan Farrukh has been dated to the 9th century. "[I]t is evident that he lived after the time of Roshan, son of Atur-frobag, son of Farukh-zad. ...Abalis, the Zandik, had a religious deputation with Atur-frobag, son of Farukh-zad, in the presence of the Kalifah Al-Mamun who reigned A.D. 813-833."

Near the beginning of his book he states, "[T]his composition is provided by me, who am Mardan-farukh son of Auharmazd-dad." He goes on to say, "I have been fervent-mindedly, at all times in my whole youthful career, an enquirer and investigator of the truth." He declares, "The possession of the truth is the one power of the faithful, through the singleness of truth."

"Now, as I have said above, I have always been earnestly anxious to know God and have been curious in searching out his religion and his will. In this spirit of inquiry I have traveled to foreign countries and (even) to India... for I did not choose my religion simply because I inherited it, but I wanted (only that religion) which was most firmly based on reason and evidence... ."

Apparently Mardan-Farrukh the author was young, earnest, well-traveled and committed. He was ably acquainted with his own religion, both its writings and the views of its authorities; also he was conversant with other systems of belief. Among Zoroastrian authors of the Pahlavi period, Mardan-Farrux can best lay "claim to being considered a philosopher." A practicing layman who drew on priestly Zoroastrian books in the Pahlavi, his work "is distinguished by its clarity of thought and orderly arrangement." It creates a "rationalist and philosophic climate."

== His Book ==
The Shkand-gumanig Vizar of Mardan-Farrukh was written during an "intellectual renaissance of Zoroastrianism" which occurred "shortly before the rapid decline of Zoroastrianism, migrations to India, and conversions to Islam." Several reasons may account for its occurrence:

"First, the times not only permitted but provoked such writings. Mu'tazilites, or Islamic free-thinkers, many of whom were Persians, had created an atmosphere of free debate and interest in philosophical and theological questions. ... Second, the Zoroastrians were losing ground and they passed from a militant defiance of Islam or the Arabs to an intellectual defensive. This may be seen in a number of apologetic works written at this time such as the Shkand Gumanik Vicar... .

In the first half of his book, Mardan-Farrukh provides his version of the prevailing Zoroastrian response to issues of theodicy (chapters 1-4 and 7–10). As he sees it, the acute moral quandary is how and why a wise and powerful God would create a world that seemingly has turned out so imperfect, which can at times appear merciless and cruel to creatures living in it. He outlines what might be called a dualist ethical metaphysics and a cosmology. In his remaining pages, the author discusses critically other neighboring religions. He addresses (chapters 11 and 12) the doctrines of the Qur'an, and later those of the Bible, both the Hebrew scriptures (chapters 13 and 14), as well as the Gospels (chapter 15). Earlier materialists (atheists or sophists) had been discussed and dismissed (chapters 5 and 6). He concludes with an adverse review of the brand of dualist theology particular to the Manichees (chapter 16). In a limited sense his work might be described as a nascent, adumbrated forerunner of comparative religion studies with the understanding, of course, that it is rendered from the view point of a 9th-century Zoroastrian.

R. C. Zaehner gives this description of Mardan-Farrukh's Shkand-Gumänïg Vichär:

This is in some ways the most interesting of all the Zoroastrian books since it presents a philosophical justification of Zoroastrian dualism in a more or less coherent form; and it further contains a detailed critique of the monotheistic creeds, Islam, Judaism, and Christianity as well as an attack on Zoroastrianism's dualistic rival, Manichaeanism."

The Škand-gumanik Vičār was translated first into Sanskrit c. 1100, for the benefit of the Parsis (the Zoroastrians of India). Modernly, the book has been translated into several European languages.

== The text ==
=== Good vs evil ===
Regarding issues of theodicy Mardan-Farrukh provides a summary of Zoroastrian doctrine. This view presents Ohrmazd, the Creator of the world, being opposed by and contested by the satanic Ahriman. The author justifies this belief by pointing to the universal presence of good vis-à-vis bad everywhere in the world, e.g., "darkness and light, knowledge and ignorance, perfume and stench, life and death, sickness and health, justice and disorder, slavery and freedom... visible in every country and land at all times." These distinct opposites are not of function, like that of the male and female, sun and moon, but rather are of the essence. "For where there is good there cannot possibly be evil. Where light is admitted darkness is driven away." Thus the antagonistic pairing prevalent everywhere springs from the opposing natures of Ohrmazd and Ahriman. "The material world is the effect of the spiritual, and the spiritual is its cause."

Accordingly, the wise and powerful Ohrmazd is not the maker of the evil that blights creation. "There is one dogma on which [Mardan-Farrukh] firmly takes his stand: God is good." Rather the Zoroastrians teach that it is his antagonist Ahriman who has corrupted the creation. The late Zoroastrian Dastur, Maneckji Nusservanji Dhalla, writes:

"The author of the Shikand Gumanik Vijar, who is himself a dualist of the most pronounced kind, strongly urges in his polemics against other religions that good and evil can on no account have originated from one and the same source. Evil is considered to have as independent and complete existence as good; they are both primeval. They are so entirely separate from each other that neither good originates from evil, nor evil from good. Each one of them exists by itself, and entertains perpetual antagonism towards the other."

Mardan-Farrukh observes that if Ohrmazd and Ahriman had created the world together or in cooperation, then Ohrmazd would be "an accomplice and confederate with Ahriman in the harm and evil which ever arise."

Prior to creation Ohrmazd exists "fully complete in his own self", such that "his perfection consists in his having no need for any advantage or increase" from the outside. Hence when he created the world it was not to obtain "any advantage or aggrandizement". Yet Ohrmazd being "wise and sagacious" his actions "cannot be irrational or unmotivated". "We must conclude," continues Mardan-Farrukh, "that the reason and occasion" for the creation of the world was "to repel and ward off" his external adversary Ahriman and defeat the evil he intends; "this is the whole reason and occasion for the act of creation."

Ohrmazd's strategy is that the good creation will act as a trap to capture Ahriman and neutralize his evil. Ahriman being aggressive, rash and ignorant (he "does not know the final outcome"), as against the thoughtful and prudent Ohrmazd, certainly the ultimate result will be the triumph of good; undoubtedly creation will be restored. The entire cosmic process from the original creation by Ohrmazd and the attack by Ahriman, until the triumphant rehabilitation of physical goodness of creation, lasts twelve thousand years. Along with the Amesha Spenta, humankind plays a vital rôle in the defeat of Druj (the Lie) and victory of Asha (the Truth).

Mardan-Farrukh notes, "The duty of the creature is to understand and perform the will of the creator, and to abstain from what is disliked by him." To do so "is to preserve the soul." The will of the creator is known through his religion. From its care "for the soul are manifested [its] grandeur" and value, and "the compassion and [mercy] of the sacred being."

=== Method ===
The author at the start announces his intention to find the truth, which brings an "inward dignity". Yet by the "thorough understanding of the truth" he means the "blessedness and truth of the good religion" first taught by Zarathustra. The author does follow up on this quest later in his book. At one point Mardan-Farrukh describes several specific approaches to discovering the true (the matter at issue being the existence of the "exalted sacred being"). "[A] knowledge of anything is acquired in three modes: by knowing what is inevitable, or by knowing what is analogous, or by what is possible and fit to exist." Later he adds the obvious: the direct tangibility of nature.

An example of inevitable knowledge is "once one is one, and twice two is four" and within the inevitable it is not possible to say that sometime or someplace twice two will be five or three. Knowledge by analogy announces something invisible derived from the visible through similarity or resemblance, e.g., from the presence of a thing made one may infer the absent maker. Information about what is possible and fit to exist seems to rely on the trustworthiness and good character of the person testifying. This attention to methods (logic, analogy and inference, testimony, and tangible evidence) demonstrates some respectful rigor and craft in persuasion.

=== Sophistry ===
Mardan-Farrukh addresses "the assertors of the non-existence of a sacred being" or the atheists. Some atheists are said to believe "that there is no reward for good works, no punishment of sin, no heaven and hell, and no stimulator of good works and crime. Besides this, that things are only worldly, and there is no spirit." Mardan-Farrukh responds "that to be made without a maker... is as impossible as to prepare what is written without a writer." As to "that there is no recompense of good works and punishment of crime" he responds that "no one whatever is seen that has come... from death back to life, and it is not possible to say so." Further, Mardan-Farrukh invokes what he calls in humankind "the manifestation of the maintenance of a hope for a supreme inspection over mankind, and indeed, over wild animals, birds, and quadrupeds."

The sophist may argue that no distinctions can be made, as honey is sweet, but "bitter to those abounding in bile" or that bread is both pleasant "to the hungry and unpleasant to the surfeited." Yet the wise say, 'Even this statement of you sophists, about the jaundiced nature of everything, is alike jaundiced, and there is no truth in it."

=== Islam ===
As Muslim regimes ruled in the Iran of Mardan-Farrukh, he did not mention Islam by name in his critique. Zoroastrians lived under increasing pressure at the time Mardan-Farrukh was writing:

"[L]ate in the ninth century the tide began to ebb swiftly for the Zoroastrians, with Islam now enjoying the full support of temporal power everywhere. It was then that the founding fathers of the Parsi community left their homeland to seek religious freedom in exile in India, and thereafter those who held by their ancient faith in Iran were steadily ground down into the position of a small, deprived, and harassed minority, lacking all privileges or consideration."

As would be expected given his prior chapters on theodicy, he faults the type of monotheism practiced by Islam because it posits an all-powerful Deity who creates the world and apparently the evil in it, so that (as he puts it) "good works and crime, truth and falsehood, life and death, good and evil are owing to him." Mardan-Farrukh alludes to passages in the Qur'an where it seems to say that the Deity may lead people astray. Relentlessly from different points of view and using various illustrations, Mardan-Farrukh asks why the sacred being, with Divine wisdom and concern for the happiness of humankind, would have chosen freely to create the world as it is, a dangerous and contentious realm where evil exists and people suffer. That is, if "no opponent or adversary of his existed" then by reason the sacred being would be the only party responsible for the calamities endured by humankind. Humans "with little knowledge and little wisdom... so far as they are able, do not let the lion and the wolf and other noxious creatures in among their own young ones... ." Yet then, "why has the merciful sacred being now let... the demons in upon his own... ?" When he placed Adam in paradise, "why was not that garden made by him fortified and strong, so that that deluder [Satan] could not have gotten into it?"

=== Judaism ===
Mardan-Farrukh likewise brings his criticism of a type of monotheism to the Jewish texts. Here, he challenges the creation story of the Bible. Of creation out of nothing in six days, he asks: if God needed only to command and it arises, "to what was that delay of six days owing? ...the existence of that delay of six days is very ill-seeming." Accordingly, because of the use of time, "it is not fitting to speak of his producing [the world] from nothing." Continuing along these lines, Mardan-Farrukh says of the Biblical God, "It is manifest that he was not light," by inference from God's reaction to light following his creation of it. Mardan-Farrukh paraphrases from the Jewish Torah, and concludes that regarding light God "considered it for the reason that he had not seen it before." Not stated here is that the Zoroastrian creator God, Ohrmazd, is essentially associated with light.

A narration in some detail he gives of the story of Adam and Eve in the garden and their expulsion from it. Mardan-Farrukh notes that God made Adam and Eve and thus made their inclinations, and that God commanded them not to eat of a certain tree, yet nonetheless they disobeyed. For this reason, he observes of the Biblical God that his "will and command are inconsistent and unadapted, one to the other." Hence the Biblical God is "manifestly an opponent and adversary to his own will." Therefore, "to indulge in wrath about [Adam and Eve] is unreasonable." Mardan-Farrukh also finds fault with this story in that the curse of God on Adam affects everyone, "reaches unlawfully over people of every kind at various periods." In this vein, he states about the Biblical God, "This is what he says about his own nature, that is, 'I am the Lord, seeking vengeance, and retaliating vengeance, and I retaliate vengeance sevenfold upon the children, and one does not forget my original vengeance.'" In unspoken contrast would be the Zoroastrian Ohrmazd, "a wise Being whose actions were held to be wholly just and accessible to reason."

=== Christianity ===
Mardan-Farrukh himself notes that his unfavorable remarks on the type of monotheism held by Judaism and by Islam would apply as well to Christianity. During the prior Sasanid era (224–651), "non-Zoroastrians frequently occasioned heated polemics in which virulent criticism and derisive terms were exchanged between the Zoroastrian priests on the one side and the prelates of the rival faith on the other." In the case of Christianity, contention was not only religious, but military. "There was a state of perennial war between Sasanian Persia and Byzantine Rome, which had embraced Christianity." A prime instance would be the border region of Armenia, which had included Zoroastrian believers since the Persian Achaemenid Empire (c. 550–330); centuries later despite Sasanid pressure, Armenia converted to Christianity (after 300) and took the Byzantine side. In general Zoroastrian arguments contra Christianity first developed in the strong and prosperous Sasanid Empire; however, following several centuries under Islam, Zoroastrian fortunes had declined drastically.

Mardan-Farrukh first questions the virgin birth, concluding skeptically "the origin of their religion has all come forth from the testimony of a woman, which was given about her own condition." He demonstrates a studied knowledge of the Christian doctrine of the Incarnation, although the premise of God taking the status of human being evokes no response, other than to call it "very strange". About the crucifixion ("death and execution on a tree") and its "resurrection" message for humankind, its 'brutality' and its "disgrace" offend Mardan-Farrukh. He questions why, from all the possible ways there are to signal human resurrection, God would want to choose to suffer such a death, if God is indeed omnipotent. If so, he asks why God did not make it "without doubt" and "clear knowledge" to humankind? Mardan-Farrukh continues, asking rhetorically if God chose such a death "through the will of his enemies" why does he curse them? Should they not be rewarded?

Mardan-Farrukh next challenges the doctrine of the Trinity, "the father and son and pure wind". Yet he begins without finesse: "If it be proper for three to be one, that implies that it is certainly possible for three to be nine... ." He questions how a son could be equal to the father; then he discusses the trinity and the crucifixion. After a theodicean analysis similar to his about Adam and Eve (see the Judaic section above), Mardan-Farrukh observes that "the sacred being himself created the executioners of his son," and concludes that these enemies then slew "the Messiah, who is the son, through the will of the father." The author's interpretation here resembles aspects of the Christian heresy fostered by the 2nd century gnostic Marcion. Mardan-Farrukh's analysis of free will in Christianity likewise (absent Ahriman) results in his ascribing to God responsibility for sins committed by humankind. Next he discusses St. Paul (Pâvarôs), quoting him thus, "Not the good works which I desire, but the iniquity which I do not desire, I do. And it is not I that do so, but that which is collected within me does it, because I always see that it is striving with me day and night." Mardan-Farrukh may well have associated St. Paul's feeling of an iniquity "within me" to Ahriman, for in the first half of the Shkand-Gumanik Vichar he states (as a proof of the existence of metaphysical evil), "[A] knowledge of the existence of an opponent of the creatures [i.e., Ahriman] is obtainable from the innermost recesses of the body of man... " which may be observed.

His critique of Christianity concludes with illustrations that seek to demonstrate a dualism partially embedded in Christian scriptures, or as he says, "The word of the Messiah is specially inconsistently a demonstrator as regards the two original evolutions" [of Ohrmazd and of Ahriman]. "[T]hey say, from the words of the Messiah, that the original evolution from the sacred being is light and goodness; evil and darkness are separate from him." Mardan-Farrukh quotes the Messiah, speaking to his human opponents:

"I am appointed by that sacred being doing good works. Why do you not hear those words of mine? Only because you are from the iniquitous one it is not possible for you to hear them, and you wish to do the will of your own father. By him truth is not spoken; whatever he speaks he tells a lie of it, therefore you are false yourselves together with your father. As for me, who speak the truth, you do not believe it of me. And he who is from the sacred being hears the words of the sacred being, but you, because you are not from the sacred being, do not hear my words."

Mardan-Farrukh immediately adds, "By these sayings it is demonstrated by him that there are two original evolutions" [of Ohrmazd and of Ahriman], one which produces the Messiah, and one producing his opponents.

Next the parable of the tree that bears good fruit is given: "[F]or every tree becomes manifest by its fruit, if it be of merit and if it be of offensiveness." Again he quotes the Messiah: "[E]very tree which the father has not sown should be dug up, and should be cast into the fire." Mardan-Farrukh concludes, "Wherefore it is fitting to understand from these words that there is a tree, which the father has not sown; that it is necessary to dig up and cast away." Apparently our author is indicating an analogy to the cosmic contention between good and evil of Zoroastrian teaching, so that here Ohrmazd will surely dig up and cast away trees sown by Ahriman.

Finally, Mardan-Farrukh quotes the Messiah: "Our father, that art in the sky, let thy empire arise! And may it be thy will that shall take place on earth as in the sky! Also give us daily bread! And do not bring us to a cause of doubt!" He then continues: "From these words it is evident that his will is not so unalloyed on earth as in the sky. Also this, that the cause of doubt of mankind is not owing to the sacred being." So does the author work to appropriate to the Zoroastrian dualist view the words of the Christian Messiah, i.e., that Ahriman has corrupted the earth and injected doubt into mankind.

== Perspectives ==
{WORK IN PROCESS}

=== Tawhid ===
Similar issues were addressed by the Muslim writer Maulana Muhammad Ali (1874–1951). He rejects as misinformed what he terms a popular idea that the Deity in Islam is maker of both good and evil. This false notion he traces to a long-ago "clash of Islam with Persian religious thought." Ali continues:

"The doctrine that there are two creators, a creator of good and a creator of evil, had become the central doctrine of the Magian religion [another name for Zoroastrianism]... . The religion of Islam taught the purest monotheism, and it was probably in controverting the dualistic doctrine of the Magian religion, that the discussion arose as to whether or not God was the creator of evil. These discussions grew very hot and many side-issues sprang up. ... God created man with certain powers which he could exercise under certain limitations, and it is the exercise of these powers in one way or another that produces good or evil. ... Hence the controversy, as to whether God was the creator of good and evil, arose simply out of a misconception of the nature of good and evil."

Notwithstanding, Mardan-Farrukh asks why (if no adversary like Ahriman pre-existed as an independent source of evil) would the sacred being, who acts judiciously and desires universal "happiness and prosperity", come to create a world that results in "misery for multitudes of the innocent who are distressed, poor, necessitous, and sick." Moreover, Mardan-Farrukh insists on the logic that a solitary creator would imply ultimately a single source for all moral qualities; "if it be said that evil and crime arise from [Satan] or mankind, that implies, as they are likewise created and produced by the sacred being, that he is the source of them." Rather instead, for Zoroastrians the cause-of-evil Ahriman in origin and nature is completely independent of Ohrmazd the sacred being; even now Ohrmazd is contending in the long-term but certain process by which he will defeat Ahriman with finality.

=== Book of Job ===
From a comparative perspective, a Jewish response to the Zoroastrian faith may be seen in the Book of Job, which was written during or following a period of fruitful interaction between the Jews and the Zoroastrian Persians. In the Book of Job, the Biblical God allows Satan to severely punish Job, even though Job has done no wrong to merit the abuse. The tragedy of innocent suffering is discussed without resolution by Job and by several friends who blame Job unjustly. Finally, an epiphany of ecstasy is visited on Job by the merciful Deity, in which Job comes to hear God and to realize with awe the Mystery, that God's ways are beyond the reckoning of humankind.

"Any claim that the world was created by a good and benevolent god must provoke the question why the world, in the outcome, is so very far from good. Zoroaster's answer, that the world had been created by a good and an evil spirit of equal power, who set up to spoil the good work, is a complete answer: it is a logical answer, more satisfying to the thinking mind than the one given by the author of the Book of Job, who withdrew to the claim that it did not behoove man to inquire into the ways of Omnipotence."

Following a method found in modern comparative religion, more than one answer is possible, and several views may respectfully co-exist whatever the apparent mutual contradiction. Hence, the Zoroastrian position as discussed more than a thousand years ago by Mardan-Farrukh in his Shikand-gumanik Vichar may be said to embody a rational search by an inquiring mind as befits a creature of God.

== Bibliography ==
=== Texts ===
- Hoshang Dastur Jamaspji Asana and E. W. West, editors, [ŠGV] (Bombay 1887). Texts in Pazand, Sanskrit, and Pahlavi (I-V).
- Neryosang, translator, [ŠGV], in Ervad Shariarji D. Bharucha, editor, Collected Sanskrit writings of the Parsis, Pt. IV (Bombay 1913).
- Jean de Menasce, translator, Škand-gumānīk Vičār. La solution décisive des doutes. Une apologétique mazdéenne du IXe Siècle. Texte pazand-pehlevi transcrit, traduit et commenté (Fribourg en Suisse: Librairie de l'Université 1945). Text transcript in Latin letters.
- E. W. West, translator, Sikand-gûmânîk Vigâr, in his Pahlavi Texts, Part III (Oxford University Press 1885; reprint: Motilal Banarsidass, Delhi 1994). Volume 24 of the Sacred Books of the East, edited by Max Müller.
- R. C. Zaehner, The Teachings of the Magi. A Compendium of Zoroastrian Beliefs (London: George Allen & Unwin Ltd. 1956; reprints: Sheldon Press, London 1975; Oxford University Press, New York 1976). Includes translation of Chapter VIII of Šikand Gumānī Vazār.
- R. C. Zaehner, Zurvan. A Zoroastrian Dilemma (Oxford University 1955; reprint: Biblo & Tannen, New York 1972). Includes translation of Chapter XVI of Šikand Gumānī Vazār.
- J. Darmesteter, transl., The Zend Avesta. Part I, Vendidad (Oxford University 1887; reprint Motilal Banarsidass, Delhi 1980). S.B.E., v.4.
- E. W. West, translator, Pahlavi Texts, Part I (Oxford University Press 1880; reprint: Motilal Banarsidass, Delhi 1977). S.B.E., v.5.
- Seyyed Hossein Nasr and Mehdi Aminrazavi, editors, An Anthology of Philosophy in Persia, volume 1 (New York: Oxford Univ. 1999).

=== Commentary ===
- H. W. Bailey, Zoroastrian Problems in the ninth-century books (Oxford University: Clarendon Press 1943).
- Ervad Sheriarji Dadabhai Bharucha, Zoroastrian Religion and Customs (Bombay: D. B Taraporevala 1893, 1903, 1979).
- Mary Boyce, Zoroastrians. Their Religious Beliefs and Practices (London: Routledge & Kegan Paul 1979, 1985).
- Mary Boyce, Zoroastrianism. Its antiquity and constant vigour (Costa Meza, California: Mazda Publishers/Bibliotheca Persica 1992).
- Mary Boyce, A Persian Stronghold of Zoroastrianism (Oxford University: Clarendon 1977; reprint: University Press of America 1989).
- Henry Corbin, Terre céleste et corps de résurrection: de l'Iran mazdéen à l'Iran shî'ite (Paris: Buchet-Chastel 1960), translated as Spiritual Body and Celestial Earth. From Mazdean Iran to Shī'ite Iran (Princeton University 1977; reprint: I. B. Tauris, London 1990).
- Maneckji Nusservanji Dhalla, History of Zoroastrianism (Oxford University 1938; reprint: K.R.Cama Oriental Institute, Bombay 1963).
- Jacques Duchesne-Guillemin, La religion de l'Iran ancien (Paris: Presses Universitaires de France 1962), translated as Religion of Ancient Iran (Bombay: K. M. JamaspAsa 1973).
- W. B. Henning, Zoroaster. Politician or Witchdoctor? (Oxford University 1951).
- Farhang Mehr, The Zoroastrian Tradition. An introduction to the ancient wisdom of Zarathustra (Rockport, Mass.: Element 1991).
- Phiroz D. Mehta, Zarathushtra. The transcendental vision (Shaftesbury, Dorset: Element Books 1985).
- Jean de Menasce, O.P., "Zoroastrian Literature after the Muslim Conquest" in R. N. Frye, editor, The Cambridge History of Iran. From the Arab Invasion to the Saljuqs (Cambridge University 1975) at 543-565 ["Škand-Gumānīk Vicār" at 560-564].
- James Hope Moulton, Early Zoroastrianism (London: Williams and Norgate 1913).
- R. C. Zaehner, Zurvan. A Zoroastrian Dilemma (Oxford Univ. 1955; reprint: Biblio & Tannen, NY 1972). Cf. B.S.O.A.S. 17:232-249 (1955).
- R. C. Zaehner, The Dawn and Twilight of Zoroastrianism (London: Weidenfeld and Nicolson 1961).
- R. C. Zaehner, The Teachings of the Magi. A Compendium of Zoroastrian Beliefs (London: George Allen & Unwin Ltd. 1956; reprints: Sheldon Press, London 1975; Oxford University Press, New York 1976). Includes translation of Chapter VIII of Shikand Gumānī Vazār.
- M. M. Ali, The Religion of Islam (Lahore: Ahmadiyya Anjuman Isha'at Islam 1936).
- Alessandro Bausani, Persia Religiosa (Milano 1959), translated as Religion in Iran (New York: Bibliotheca Persica 2000).
- Edward G. Browne, A Literary History of Persia (London: T. Fisher Unwin 1902; reprint: Cambridge University 1964), 4 volumes.
- Richard N. Frye, The Heritage of Persia (Cleveland: World Publishing Co. 1963).
- Geo Widengren, Mani und der Manichäismus (Stuttgart 1961), transl. as Mani and Manichaeism (London: Weidenfeld and Nicolson 1965).
- Ehsan Yarshater, editor, Encyclopedia Iranica (London: Routledge & Kegan Paul 1982- ).
