= Jules Isaac =

Jewish French historian (1877–1963)

Jules Isaac (18 November 1877 in Rennes – 6 September 1963 in Aix-en-Provence) was "a well known and highly respected Jewish historian in France with an impressive career in the world of education" by the time World War II began.

Internationally, Isaac was most well known for his tireless work after the Second World War in the field of Jewish-Christian relations, starting with his book Jésus et Israël, which was written during the war and made him a protagonist in the Seelisberg Conference of 1947, culminating in his decisive key role in the origin of the groundbreaking declaration Nostra Aetate during the Second Vatican Council. In the 1950s, Isaac had an international reputation for his work in Christian and Jewish relations.

== Life ==
Jules Isaac (full name Jules Marx Isaac) was born in Rennes on November 18, 1877. He was born into "an old Jewish family." Isaac's paternal grandfather served in the Grand Army and fought in the Battle of Waterloo. His father was a French career military officer and was appointed squadron leader during the Second French Empire. Both were awarded the Legion of Honour.

When Isaac was age twelve, both parents died a few months apart. After that, he entered Lakanal high school in Sceaux. His philosophy teacher in high school was Henri Bergson.

Charles Péguy

External videos
- Jules Isaac about Charles Peguy July 15, 1959

In 1897, when Isaac was twenty, he met Charles Péguy. This began "a long friendship" in which Isaac was influenced by Péguy. Together they created the French magazine Cahiers de la Quinzaine. Péguy was a Christian. He and Isaac were friends for seventeen years, until Peguy died on 5 September 1914. They worked as a team for "reconciliation between Jews and Christians." In doing so, they faced anti-Semitism. Anti-Semitism in France had been promulgated by Édouard Drumont in his widely read La France juive.

Dreyfus affair
Isaac was seventeen when the Dreyfus affair broke in 1894. He and his friend Péguy supported Dreyfus until its resolution in 1906. Isaac had already become a founder of the Socialist Liberal journal The Fortnight and was dedicated to fight injustice. Isaac supported Dreyfus, not only because Dreyfus was, like him, Jewish. His support for Dreyfus was grounded on "his deep passion for the liberating qualities of truth."

== Career ==
In 1902, Isaac received the Aggregation of History and Geography. The same year he also married the painter Laure Ettinghausen. Together they had one daughter, Juliette (b. 1903), and two sons, Daniel (b. 1907) and Jean-Claude (b. 1918).

Isaac was a professor for more than 30 years. In 1906, Isaac began teaching history at Nice, then at Sens. He possessed a genius at making history "understandable."

As a writer of history texts, known as Malet-Isaac, Isaac was closely associated with the Hachette Book Group. The Hachette Book Group was and still is a major publisher of France's school history texts and other history books. Another French historian, Albert Malet, had been writing history texts for Hachette. The two historians never met. Malet died in 1915, fighting in World War I. Isaac began revising the texts that Malet had written. However, Hachette, required that Malet be named as the coauthor. The publisher feared that Isaac's Jewish name would hinder sales of the texts to Catholic schools. Hachette published a 21-page pamphlet Cours d'histoire Malet-Isaac (Classiques Hachette, 192?) listing all the text books which named Malet and Isaac as coauthors .

One of Malet's texts was considered the "classic text" on French history. The classic text was Nouvelle histoire de France: l'Antiquité, le Moyen âge, les Temps modernes, la Révolution, l'Empire, la France contemporaine (New history of France: Antiquity, the Middle Ages, modern times, the Revolution, the Empire, contemporary France). After the war, Isaac expanded and updated Malet's history by "adding a chapter of 100 pages as a separate volume on the history of the war." Malet was named as the coauthor of Isaac's revision. To reflect Isaac's addition, the title of Malet's text was changed to Nouvelle histoire de France : l'Antiquité, le Moyen âge, les Temps modernes, la Révolution, l'Empire, la France contemporaine, la Grande Guerre (New history of France: Antiquity, the Middle Ages, modern times, the Revolution, the Empire, contemporary France, the Great War).

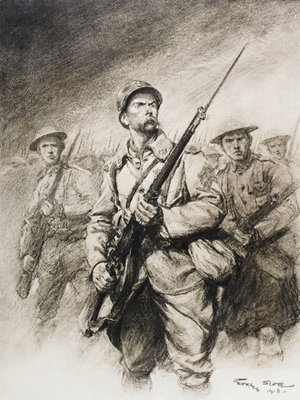
French infantry

=== Military service in First World War ===
External videos
- Les Mort Dansant (The Dancing Dead): A remembrance day tribute video to the brutality of WW1

During the First World War, Isaac was mobilized into the French army in August 1914 at age 37. He served as an infantryman for thirty-three months before being wounded in the Battle of Verdun on June 17, 1916. During his military service, Isaac and his wife Laure carried on a regular correspondence in which Isaac described his wound and the barbarism of the war.

In the Battle of Verdun, the Germans took Fort Vaux from the French on June 7, 1916. After that, rain slowed the German advance towards Fort Souville (another fort protecting the city of Verdun). On June 23 the Germans attacked again. In that period, both sides attacked and counter-attacked with no major offensive. It was during this time that Isaac was wounded on June 17, 1916.

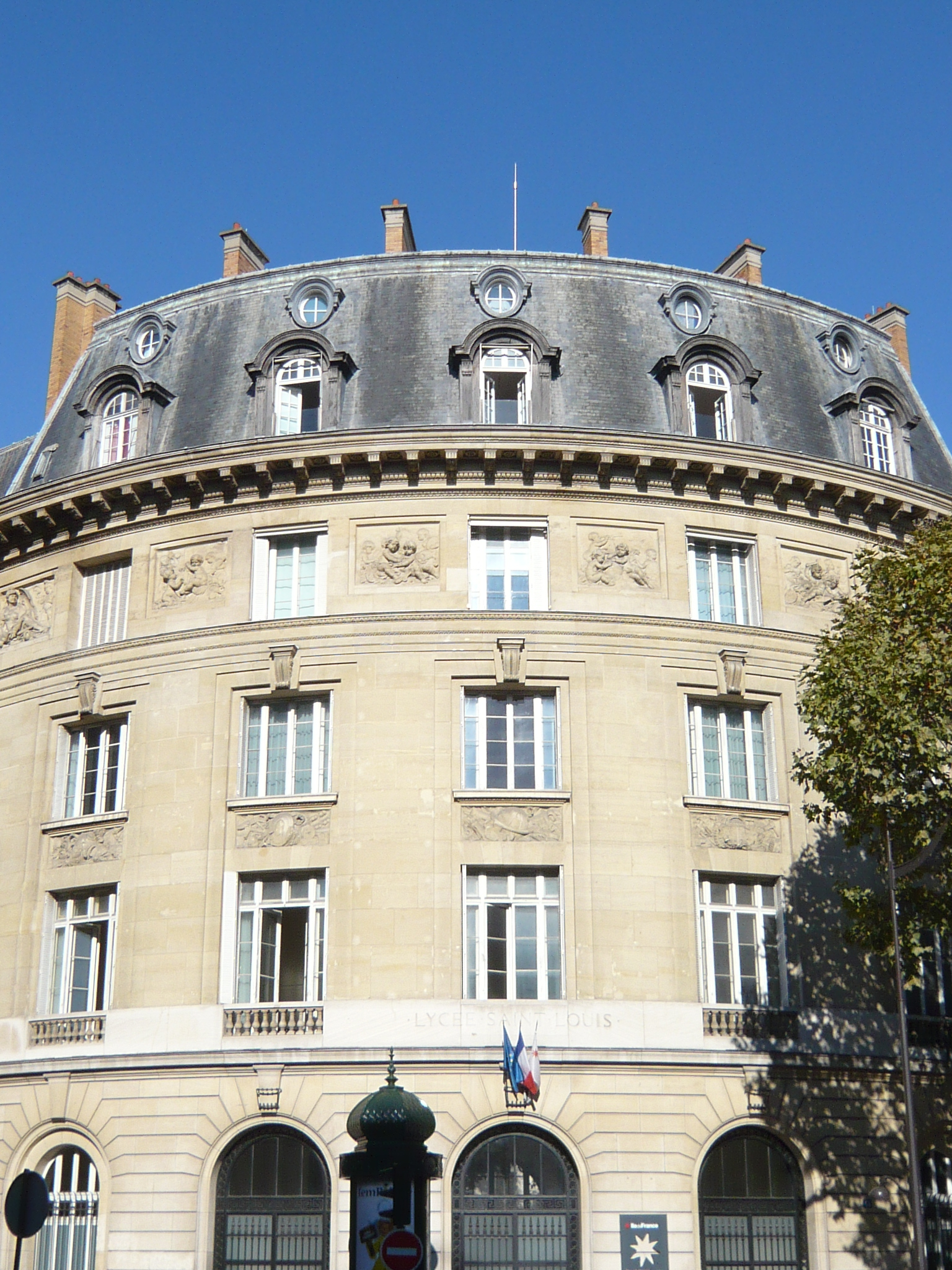
Lycée Saint-Louis

After discharge from the army
After being discharged from the army, Isaac returned to education. He was a teacher at the Lycée Saint-Louis in Paris from 1921 to 1936.

In French universities, at the time of World War I (the Great War), there were only fifty-five professors of history. However, the dearth of history courses in the universities was "balanced by the exceptional importance given to the teaching of history in high schools." History courses were required in French secondary schools. The courses were "taught by specialized teachers, who numbered 620 in 1914." When teaching about the Great War became part of the high school curriculum in 1928, a textbook by Isaac was available. In 1921, he had added a chapter of 100 pages as a separate volume on the history of the war to the "classic text" of Albert Malet, who in 1915 had been killed in the war.

In October 1936, Isaac was appointed Inspector General of Public Education in France. At that time, Inspector General "was the highest position" in the French department of education and science.

Isaac became a member of the League of Human Rights and the Vigilance Committee of Antifascist Intellectuals. He devoted himself to promoting "better understanding between France and Germany," especially in the text books he wrote or revised. He hoped that by doing this there would be less likelihood of another war between France and Germany.

In 1939, Isaac became the president of the Jury of Aggregation of History. He was, by then, "considered one of the most prominent historians of his time." However, "it was his history text books that made him famous." Isaac's textbooks clarified historical events and "brought students into contact with the original source materials."

=== World War II ===
When World War II broke out with the German invasion of Poland beginning on September 1, 1939, Isaac was a "highly respected historian in France." By June 10, 1940, France was completely occupied by the Germans.

Within four months, the Act of October 3, 1940, of the German-controlled Vichy government began "a series of discriminatory laws against Jews." By this Act, Isaac (as were all Jews) was removed from the governmental positions in education he held. On November 13, 1942, the academician Abel Bonnard wrote in the Gringoire newspaper Gringoire that "it was not possible that France's history should be taught to young people by an Isaac".

This experience of persecution led Isaac to say,

If only by grievous and ever worsening persecution, the Jewish question forced itself upon my mind and Jewish solidarity
upon my heart and conscience. I was part of this hated, slandered, scorned Israel; facing the persecutors, I fully accepted
being part of it. I also had to take on a new struggle, to deal with the unfair complaints they heaped upon us.

Isaac took refuge from the Germans in the Free Zone in Aix-en-Provence in 1941 and 1942, The Free Zone was occupied in 1942. When the Free Zone was occupied, Isaac moved first to Le Chambon-sur-Lignon, then to Riom, near his daughter and his son-in-law.

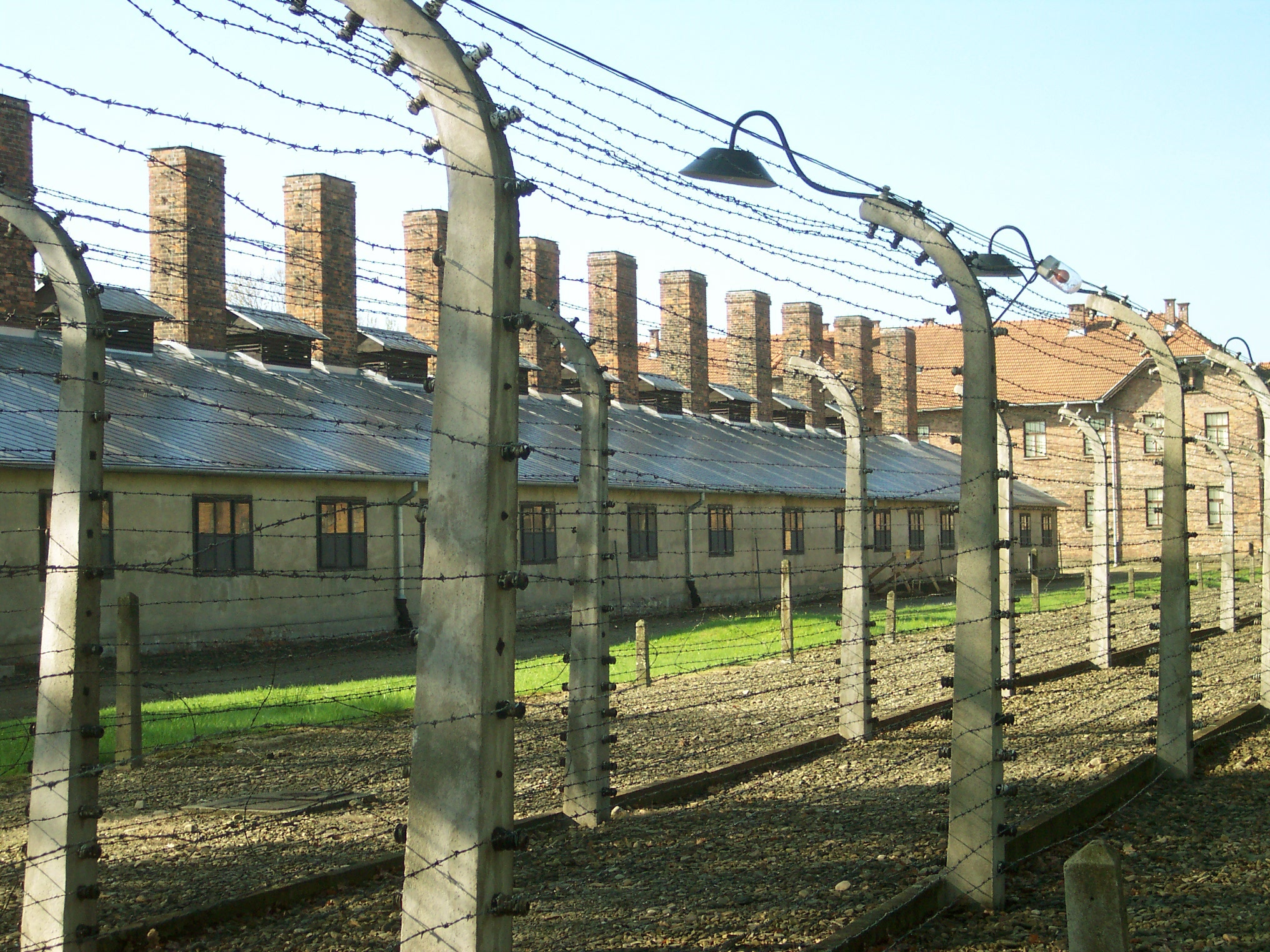
Barbed wire near by the entrance of Auschwitz I

On October 7, 1943, Isaac's wife, daughter, son-in-law, and one of his sons were arrested in Riom by the German Gestapo. His son escaped from a camp in Germany, but the other three were killed by the Germans. Isaac escaped the arrest because he was out for a walk during the raid. Isaac protested their arrests to the Nazi government. He argued that he had "never sought war with Germany." Furthermore, he said that he had wanted "understanding and peace with Germany." Isaac's protest saved himself, but not his wife and daughter. They were later killed in the Auschwitz concentration camp. Isaac avoided another arrest by "fleeing from one hiding place to the next" until the Germans retreated from France.

In addition to the fact that "there was little condemnation" by Christian churches of the anti-Jewish measures of the Nazis, many Christian leaders "cited Christian teachings as a justification" for the anti-Jewish measures. The fact of the anti-Jewish measures of the Nazis coupled with the lack of condemnation by Christians made Isaac wonder what were the roots of anti-Semitism. At the end of 1942, using books provided by clergy who were his friends, Isaac began researching the Gospels and "the classic theological Christian tradition on the Jews." After years of study and writing, he completed the 600 pages Jésus et Israel in 1947. It was published in 1947.

Isaac's wife and daughter were executed while he was doing his research. Nevertheless, he was inspired to continue his research by a small note his wife had written to him after her arrest. She wrote, "my friend, take care of yourself, have confidence and finish your work, the world is waiting for it". By his "work" she meant his study and writing about the anti-Jewish bias in the Gospels and Christian theology.

== Judaeo-Christian relations ==
After the war, Isaac changed the focus of his work from "promoting understanding and rapprochement between France and Germany" to a historical understanding of the roots of the anti-Semitism of French, German, and other people with the support of or lack of condemnation by Christian churches. In 1947, Isaac co-founded Judeo-Christian Friendship organization "committed to combating in particular the Christian roots" of anti-Semitism.

Not only did Isaac work on developing an understanding of the roots of anti-Semitism, he promoted Jewish-Christian reconciliation and Jewish-Christian dialogue. He "kept a high esteem of Christianity." Until his death, he worked to help the Christian world develop a "teaching of respect" for the Jewish people. Isaac wanted the Synagogue and the Church to respect each other. In his office there was a small statue. The face of this statue was hidden by a veil. On the one hand, the veil can symbolize the blindness of the Synagogue to "the reality of Christ and the glory of the Church," but it can also mean the blindness of the Church to the glory of the Synagogue.

Two Jewish-Christian organizations
In 1948, to develop mutual understanding among Christians and Jews Isaac and Edmond Fleg founded the Amitié Judéo-chrétienne de France (Judeo-Christian Friendship of France). Isaac was president of the association for many years.

Isaac was instrumental in the 1950 founding of the Amicizia Ebraico-cristiana di Firenze (Jewish Christian Friendship Association).

=== Jésus et Israël ===
Isaac's first book based on his research regarding the Christian roots of anti-Semitism was Jésus et Israël (published in 1948, and translated into English in 1971 as Jesus and Israel). The book is "a 600 page analysis of anti-Semitism and Christianity which compared the texts of the Gospels with Catholic and Protestant scriptural commentaries conveying a distorted picture of Jesus' attitude toward Israel and Israel's attitude toward Jesus, and which he believed were largely responsible for the anti-semitic conditioning of European Christians." In the book Isaac created the phrase "the teaching of contempt."

In his preface to Jésus et Israël, Isaac wrote that book "was born of persecution. . . . It is the cry of an outraged conscience, of a lacerated heart. It is addressed to men’s consciences and hearts. I sorrow over those who will refuse to hear it."

The book's dedication is a short poem written by Isaac, "IN MEMORIAM/To my wife and my daughter/ Martyrs/ Killed by Hitler’s Nazis/ Killed/ Simply because their name was/ ISAAC".

The pre-publication manuscript of Jésus et Israël made Isaac "a significant protagonist at the 1947 Seelisberg Conference." He played this role by "presenting to the Conference the manuscript of his book on the roots of anti-Semitism, Jésus et Israël. The Ten Points of Seelisberg were "greatly influenced" by Isaac's manuscript.

Near the end of the book, Isaac urged Christians to "recognize their initial responsibility" for anti-Judaism and to expunge such beliefs from their hearts and minds and engage in a "strenuous examination of conscience." He added that for him such action by Christian was urgent because "the glow of the Auschwitz crematorium is the beacon that lights, that guides all my thoughts."

In 1947, Isaac had completed the manuscript of Jesus and Israel. He met in Paris with a group of European Christian and Jewish intellectuals and presented his Eighteen Points for the "rectification necessary in Christian teaching" regarding the Jews to counter anti-Semitism.

In an Appendix to Jesus and Israel, Isaac included his Eighteen Points needed to rectify Christian doctrine.

Isaac’s 18 Points in Jesus and Israel
- 1. Give all Christians a basic knowledge of the Old Testament and its Jewish origins.
- 2. Explain that much of Christian liturgy drew its foundations from the Old Testament.
- 3. Do not omit that God had first revealed himself through the Old Testament to the Jews and later to the Christians.
- 4. Judaism is not a degenerative faith. Christianity was born of it.
- 5. The myth of Jewish historical dispersion, because of death of Jesus, is wrong. The Jews had been largely dispersed from Israel for almost 500 years before Jesus.
- 6. The Gospels text use of the word Jews is too broad in its context. The Jews of Jesus’ experience were limited to the Temple Jews and a small crowd before Pilate. The misreading of the Gospels blankets all Jews, everywhere, equally and erroneously.
- 7. Jesus was a Jew.
- 8. Jesus lived as a Jew.
- 9. Jesus recruited his Apostles from the Jews.
- 10. Jesus, throughout his ministry, only sought to gather adherents from the Jews.
- 11. Do not teach that Jesus was rejected by the Jews, before and during his trial and crucifixion, because the vast majority of the Jews had no knowledge of Jesus.
- 12. Jesus was not universally rejected by the Jewish leadership. The Gospels recognize he was rejected by a section of the Priests who were not unanimous against Jesus.
- 13. There is nothing in the Gospels of a universal condemnation of the Jews.
- 14. Be aware of the false charge of Deicide.
- 15. The Gospels make clear that the High Priest and his supporters acted without the knowledge of the people.
- 16. The trial of Jesus was a Roman trial, not a Jewish trial. The Jewish people, as a whole, did not even know of the trial or its brutalities.
- 17. The procurator of the Roman trial was Pontius Pilate, with full control over life and death, not the Jews. The fourth Gospel acknowledges that the accusation and the trial involved the High Priest and his supporters alone.
- 18. The accusation, "His blood be on us and our children," cannot balance against Jesus’ words of forgiveness on the Cross: "Father, forgive them for they know not what they do."

At the 1947 Seelisberg Conference of Christians and Jews, the Eighteen Points were incorporated into the "Ten Points of Seelisberg" adopted by the Conference. The Conference led to the formation of L’Amitié Judéo-Chrétienne in 1948 by Isaac for "the promotion of Christian-Jewish understanding."

Negative review
Jesus and Israel "had its critics." They argued that anti-Semitism was not started by Christianity. Anti-Semitism existed in the pre-Christian world.

In reply to such critics, in 1956 Isaac wrote Génése de l’Anti-Sémitisme (Translated into English as Has Anti-Semitism Roots in Christianity? in 1961). He accepted that Pagan anti-Semitism existed. However, Isaac argued that there was a significant difference between pagan and Christian anti-Semitism. He said that the former was "directed at a people considered separatist and unassimilable." Christianity "added theology to historical xenophobia" and condemned Jews "as a people of deicides to be cursed, punished, driven into exile."

Isaac expanded this argument in his final book published a year before his death, L'Enseignement de Mépris (1962).

=== Teaching of Contempt ===
Isaac's last book was L'Enseignement de Mépris (1962). The English translation The Teaching of Contempt: Christian Roots of Anti-Semitism was published in 1964. "The thesis of the book is that the contempt in which Jewish people are held by such great numbers of people and the persecutions which they have experienced through nineteen hundred years are to be traced to a Christian source—the charge that the Jewish people are a ‘deicide’ people, that they ‘killed God’."

In the English translation, Isaac said, "we are all familiar with the words of Jesus from the Fourth Gospel, ‘In my Father's house are many mansions’ (John 14:2). I fear that in Satan's house there are even more, if only to accommodate the thousand varieties of anti-Semitism." Then he defended his "struggle to expose and, if possible, to extirpate the Christian roots of anti-Semitism" because he continued, "in my opinion they are the deepest of all."

Later in the book, Isaac stated two principles:

1. "All authorities are agreed that anti-Semitism is by definition unchristian, even anti-Christian. A true Christian cannot be an anti-Semite; he simply has no right to be one. . . ."
2. "There is a Christian anti-Semitism. Whether conscious or subconscious, it is perennial and virulent, of great scope and intensity. It may be affirmed with complete confidence that the majority of Christians–or those recognized as such–are anti-Semites. For even in the best Christians, even in those who fought most courageously against Nazi anti-Semitism, it is easy to distinguish traces of a kind of subconscious anti-Semitism."

Regarding a justification for his study and assertion of the bias of the Gospels, Isaac wrote that "the historian has a right and a duty, an absolute duty, to see the Gospel accounts of the Passion as testimony weighed against the Jews."

Negative review
In 1964, there was a negative review of The Teaching of Contempt in the Journal of Church and State Vol. 6, No. 3.

While one identifies himself with the author in deploring the idea that the Jews today are responsible for the crucifixion of Jesus because they are descendants of the Jews of Judea in A.D. 30, it must, in honesty, be observed that the professor is not convincing in his interpretation of the Gospels. He ‘manipulates’ them to present his view, just as he accuses the anti-Semitists of doing to present their view. He rejects the Synoptic accounts of the Passion as historical and bases his argument on the Gospel of John. All sound scholarship recognizes John as the most ‘theological’ of all the Gospels.

=== Relations with the Roman Catholic Church ===
This section is about three critical meetings in which Isaac (sometimes and other Jewish leaders) had with Roman Catholic officials that effected changes in the Church's attitude toward Jews.

1947 meeting with intellectuals

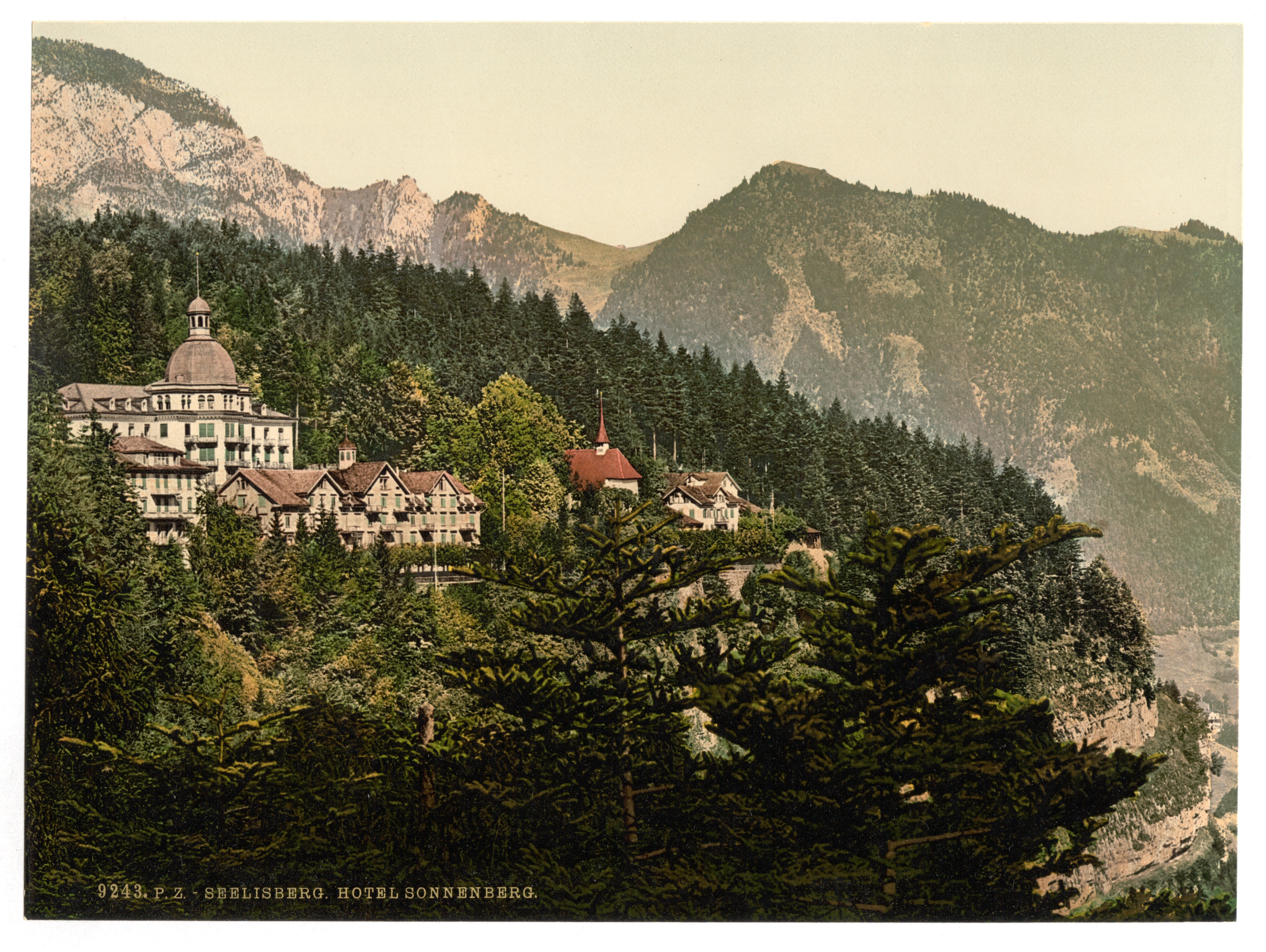
Seelisberg: Hotel Sonnenberg

In 1947, Isaac "met with Jewish and Catholic intellectuals to submit his Eighteen Points: specific recommendations for the purification of Christian teaching regarding the Jews."

In August 1947 an "Emergency Conference on Anti-semitism" was convened by an Anglo-American committee at Seelisberg in Switzerland as the Seelisberg Conference. At this conference, the Christian participants in the Commission on "The task of the Churches in Fighting Against anti-Semitism" formulated the famous Ten Points of Seelisberg, taking as a starting document Isaac's Eighteen Points.

1949 meeting with Pope Pius XII

1960 meeting with Pope John XXIII
On June 13, 1960, at age 83, Isaac had a private audience with Pope John XXIII who was 79. During his audience, Isaac "summarized in a portfolio his research into the history of the Christian ‘teaching of contempt’ for Jews and Judaism."

In his diary, Isaac described the warm reception he received from the Pope. At the end of the audience, Isaac asked the Pope whether he could "carry away a bit of hope." The Pope replied, "You have a right to more than hope!" Then, smiling, the Pope added, "I'm the chief, but I must also consult, have the offices study the questions raised. It isn't an absolute monarchy here."

Isaac's diary entries regarding his preparation and the audience with Pope John XXIII can be read at “Isaac’s Audience with Pope John XXIII.”

The audience was a major impetus for Pope John's directing Cardinal Augustin Bea, the president of the Pontifical Council for Promoting Christian Unity, to draft "a declaration on the Catholic Church's relationship to the Jewish people for the upcoming Second Vatican Council." This action by the Pope led to the promulgation of Nostra aetate (In Our Time) on October 28, 1965. "With Nostra Aetate the Catholic Church took leave from an almost 2,000 year old anti-Jewish tradition, a profound break with the age-old teaching of contempt."

On January 6, 1956, at the Hôtel Lutetia in Paris (where survivors of the extermination camps had come after their release to be met by their families), the MRAP (NGO) was awarded to Isaac. The award was in recognition of the "great impact" of Isaac's books Jésus et Israël (Jesus and Israel) and Genèse de l'antisémitisme (Genesis of Antisemitism)."

== Death and legacy ==
Jules Isaac died on September 6, 1963. Although he, like Pope John XXIII, did not live to see the results of the Vatican II Council in Nostra Aetate, published in 1965, this document was the culmination of Isaac’s work in Jewish-Christian relations and his voice "could be heard echoing" in it.

On May 3, 1964, the Jewish Christian Friendship Association, of which Isaac was a cofounder, put on a commemorative celebration in honour of Isaac.

An International Conference to commemorate the fiftieth anniversary of Isaac's death was held June 30–July 3, 2013, in Aix-en-Provence. The conference was held in cooperation with IECJ, Interuniversity Institute of Jewish Studies & Culture. The opening address “The Legacy of Jules Isaac” was given by Edouard Robberechts who is a lecturer in Jewish philosophy at the Aix-Marseille University. In the address, Robberechts spoke of the "two passions" that animated Isaac's life: "the passion for truth, and the ethical requirement for justice." As a historian, Isaac's passion for truth was played out by his "honest and patient scientific" search for "historical truth." His passion for justice meant that he saw his "historical work" as revealing "demands justice and calls for individual responsibility" so as to direct history in a "more humane" way.

In April 2015 a website for the Jules Isaac Foundation was established in the Netherlands. The Jules Isaac Foundation is a Christian foundation in the Netherlands. The Foundation's goals include furthering knowledge about the life and works of Isaac, in particular with regard to his role as a pioneer in the development of a Christian theology without anti-Semitism.

== Works ==
Articles by Jules Isaac

- "JULES ISAAC. Professor of History at the Lycée of Lyons," wrote five articles in The Encyclopædia Britannica: a Dictionary of Arts, Sciences, Literature and General Information, Eleventh Edition (New York, the Encyclopædia Britannica Company, 1911). The articles are AMBOISE, GEORGES D’, Vol. I; ANNE OF FRANCE, Vol. II; DU BELLAY, GUILLAUME, Vol. VIII; FRANCIS I, Vol. IX; Louis XII, Vol XVII: all tagged as "J. I.".)

Books by Jules Isaac in English

- Everyone's History of France translated by J. N. Dixon (Hachette et cie, 1919)
- Jésus et Israël (1948, revised 1959) translated into English as Jesus and Israel (Holt, Rhinehart and Winston, 1971).
- L'Antisémitisme a-t-il des racines chrétiennes (Fasquelle, 1960) translated into English as Has Anti-Semitism Roots in Christianity?, (National Conference of Christians and Jews, New York, 1961).
- L'Enseignement de Méprissuivi de L'antisémitisme a-t-il des racines chrétiennes? (1962) translated into English as The Teaching of Contempt: Christian roots of anti-Semitism (Holt, Rhinehart and Winston, 1964).

List of Isaac's books with titles translated into English

A list of Isaac’s works with titles translated into English can be found at Isaac’s Works.

Text books by Jules Isaac

As a prolific writer of history text books for French schools, Isaac was closely associated with the Hachette Book Group. Another French historian Albert Malet had been writing history texts for Hachette. The two historians never met. Malet died in 1915, fighting in World War I. After being discharged from the military and returning to teaching, Isaac began revising the texts that Malet had written.

Isaac’s postwar revision of Malet’s "classic text" was published in 1921. It consisted of adding a chapter of 100 pages as a separate volume on the history of the war. When teaching about the Great War became part of the high school curriculum in 1928, this revised textbook by Isaac was available and used. In Isaac’s added chapter on the history of the war, he included not only the battles, but also the experiences of individual soldiers. Malet was named as the coauthor of Isaac’s revision.

There are conflicting reasons given for adding Malet’s name as a coauthor to Isaac’s added volume on the Great War. One is that Hachette Book Group required that Malet be named as the coauthor because Hatchette thought that Isaac’s Jewish name would hurt sales to Catholic schools. The other reason given is that Isaac himself insisted on adding Malet’s name to the volume he had written because Malet had died in the war.

Works about Jules Isaac

- Hommage solennel a Jules Isaac: 1877-1963; Salle des Centraux, le 21-10-1963 (1963)
- André Kaspi, Jules Isaac ou la passion de la vérité (Plon 2002).
- Michel Michel, Jules Isaac, un historien dans la grande guerre: Lettres et carnets, 1914-1917 (Armand Colin, 2004).
- Michael Azar, Exegeting the Jews: The Early Reception of the Johannine "Jews" (BRILL, 2016), 12–16.

Archives of Jules Isaac

The complete archives of Jules Isaac have been under the care of L'Association des amis de Jules Isaac' in Aix en Provence, France. The archives are gradually being classified and moved to the National Library of France in Paris.

== See also ==
- Pope John Paul II and Judaism
- Relations between Catholicism and Judaism
