= Case of the Basse-Pointe 16 =

Unsolved French criminal case

The Case of the Basse-Pointe Sixteen (French: affaire des seize de Basse-Pointe) is an unsolved French criminal case that lasted from 1948 until 1951. The trial went beyond the framework of the Assize Court to become a trial about French colonialism in the Antilles. It was also notable for the outpouring of solidarity from trade union and communist movements in Martinique and in mainland France, Bordeaux in particular.

== Overview ==
In September 1948 there was a strike on a sugar plantation in Basse-Pointe, Martinique. On September 6, the white administrator, Guy de Fabrique Saint-Tours, was killed by thirty-six strikes with a large blade (a cutlass or a machete). Following an intense manhunt lasting several weeks, sixteen sugar cane cutters were arrested. They were imprisoned in Martinique for three years awaiting trial until their 1951 transfer to Bordeaux. All were acquitted due to lack of evidence.

== Progress of the case ==
=== A tense social context ===
In 1946, Martinique had transformed from a colonial territory to an overseas French department. Tensions persisted around racism and the legacies of slavery, particularly as it shaped economic inequalities related to labor and land ownership. This included the concentration of property ownership and power amongst the white béké class (about 1% of the population) despite strenuous working conditions, high cost of living, and low wages for the majority non-white population.

The béké population had also largely supported the authoritarian and Nazi-allied Vichy regime that had briefly administered Martinique during World War Two. Communist and communist-allied resistance movements had also gained influence during the war, contributing to increasingly numbers of strike actions in the aftermath of the war in the lead up to departmentalization.

The social context was growing tense and the administration sometimes relied on violent repression of protests, particularly against communist and trade unionist movements. Six months just before the events in Basse-Pointe on the Lajus estate in Carbet, the first prefect Pierre Trouillé ordered the local garde mobile to fire without warning on striking workers, killing three and seriously injuring two.

=== The killing of Guy de Fabrique ===
The Leyritz estate located in Basse-Pointe, was one of several sugar estates owned by the rich white creole industrialist Victor Depaz. In August 1948, he fired and expelled three resident workers over a disagreement about their work agreement.

Albert Crétinoir, the communist mayor of Basse-Pointe, and the Martinican Communist Party (PCM) supported the dismissed workers by launching a strike. The striking workers went from plantation to plantation to convince other cane cutters to stop work.

At the Leyritz estate, about sixty striking workers had a confrontation with Gaston de Fabrique, the béké manager of the estate, and his brother Guy de Fabrique, an administrator for Victor Depaz. The de Fabrique brothers were armed and accompanied by two gendarmes. A shot was fired and a fight broke out. The strikers disarmed the gendarmes and Guy de Fabrique fled across a cane field. His dead body was later found on September 6, marked by 36 cutlass blows.

=== Manhunt and arrest of suspects ===
The Minister of the Interior at the time, the socialist Jules Moch, intended to use the affair to reduce unrest by break the Communist-led strike actions of the 40,000 cane cutters of the island. After an intense manhunt lasting several weeks, the administration was still unable to determine a suspect.

Eventually, the administration arrested 18 agricultural workers who were known to be trade unionists and communists. All were male workers between 26 and 56 years old and all were non-white (including three of Indian origin). The 18 spent almost three years in pretrial detention. Two of them were released after two years because they were not in the area at the time of the crime. The remaining sixteen accused were named Sébastien Julina, Albert Rovela, Jean Bastel, Stéphane Roselmac, Félix Goidaman, Romain Nelar, Eusèbe Roure, Edmond Cressant, René Polomat, Nestor Clio, Omer Surbon, Crépin Romain, Marcelin Hérard, Louis Blézés and two named Moutoussamy.

The indictment of some defendants was based on erroneous evidence, including alleged confessions reported by people who were never in fact where they claimed to be.

Unions and communists continued their campaign of solidarity, including petitions and protests against the slowness of the investigation. The trial was increasingly seen as a case study of racism and colonial repression. Tensions grew to a point that the trial was relocated from Fort-de-France to Bordeaux.

=== Political trial ===
==== Reception in mainland France and support committee ====
In 1951, after three years in pre-trial detention, the sixteen accused were finally sent to mainland France to stand trial. The French Communist Party and other unions organized support. When the ship carrying the accused arrived at the port of Le Havre, the dockers went on a twenty-four hour strike in support the detainees by refusing to help disembark what they argued was a "prison ship" of colonial repression. The sixteen accused were eventually transferred to Bordeaux and imprisoned in the Fort du Hâ.

The Communist Party, trade unions, the Mouvement contre le Racisme et pour l’Amitié entre les Peuples ("Movement against Racism and for Friendship between Peoples" or MRAP), and the Secours Populaire coordinated to provide a defense for the accused. The eleven defense lawyers, most of them Communists, included Martinican politician Georges Gratiant, founding MRAP member Marcel Manville, and Gerty Archimède, the first female deputy for Guadeloupe.

The Communists hoped the trial would make a political statement about racism and the legacies of slavery in France and the French empire. Journalist Jean Pernot regularly published articles in Les nouvelles de Bordeaux et du Sud-Ouest highlighting the connections between the case and Bordeaux's history as a key port in the history of trans-Atlantic slavery. Similarly, the MRAP newspaper Droit et Liberté appealed to its readers to challenge "the machinations of the Creole Békés and their support from the administration" and "high commerce." They urged the public to "be stronger than the Creole békés and those who support them" in order to "thwart the plans of the racist colonialists.”

==== Course of the trial ====
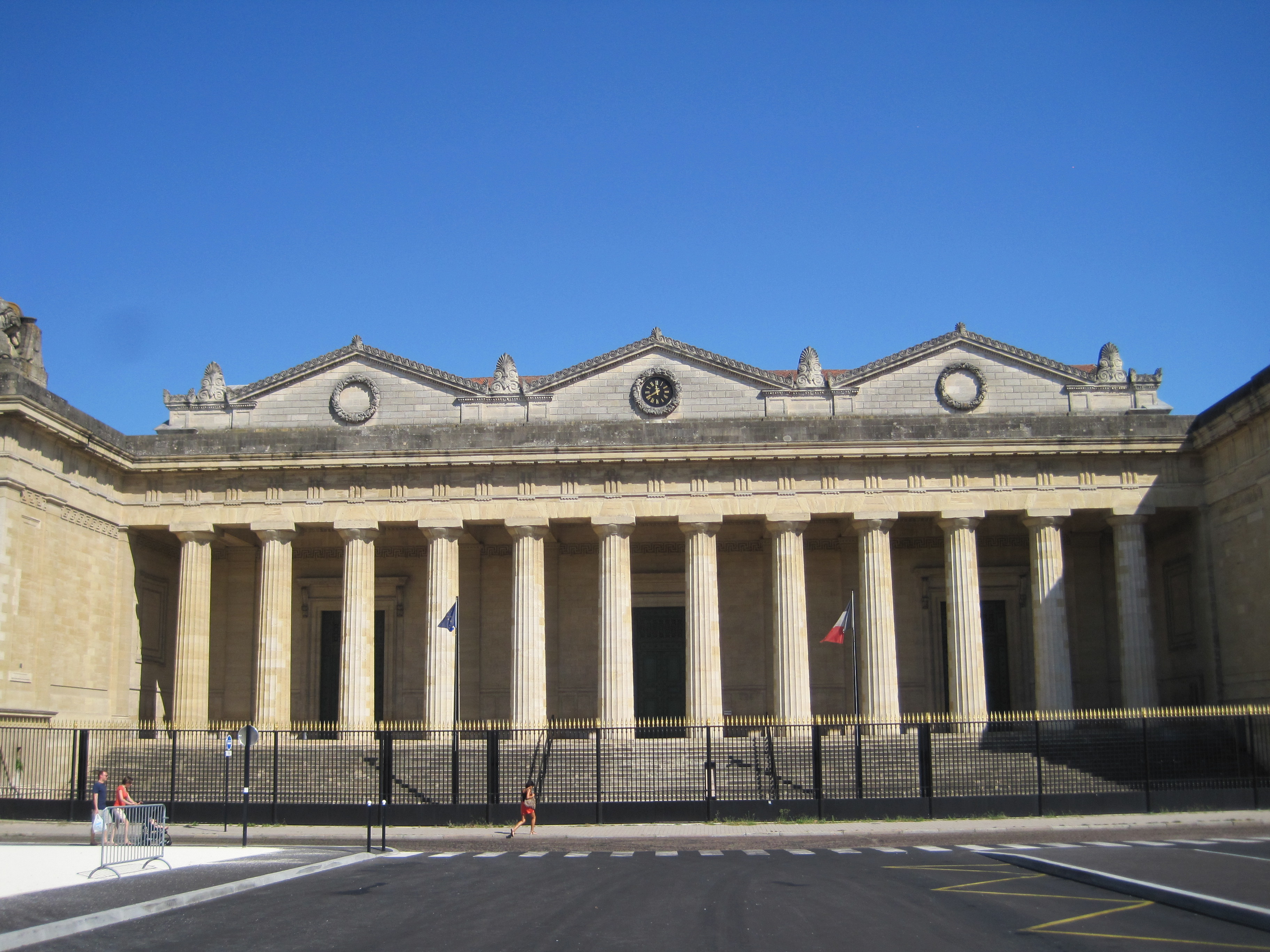
Bordeaux courthouse

The trial began on August 9, 1951, at the Assize Court of Bordeaux located in the Palais Thiac.

None of the "witnesses" for the prosecution had first-hand knowledge of the crime itself. The prosecution presented the defendants as lazy, ignorant and deceitful while presenting the murdered Guy de Fabrique as a hard worker. They also argued that the striking workers created an atmosphere of intimidation in which any actual witnesses would not be likely to come forward.

The defense highlighted the weaknesses of the case, including the reliability of the witness testimony and the shoddy crime-scene investigation. The defense also emphasized the social and historical inequalities of the larger plantation context. This testimony by ethnographer Michel Leiris who described the situation in Martinique as "the most appalling spectacle of misery of [his] existence". Lead lawyer Georges Gratiant also picked up on this theme, speaking to loud applause in the name of "we who love France in spite of colonialist oppression" and encouraging the jury to "throw away the whip and the chicotte by opening your heart and opening the gates of Fort du Hâ."

In the absence of any solid evidence against the workers, the trial ended on August 13, 1951, with the general acquittal for the sixteen. While it was believed that at least several of the defendants were in fact guilty, the court was unable to pronounce a collective guilty verdict for the group as a whole.

==== Release ====
Several hours after the verdict, the sixteen accused left Fort du Hâ and were greeted by crowds of hundreds of people.

The sixteen lived with different Bordeaux families until they departed for Paris.

==== Difficult return to Martinique ====
On August 31, 1951, the sixteen left Paris and arrived on in Fort-de-France, Martinique on September 12. They were warmly welcomed by a large crowd, including CGT union secretary Ambroise Guimèze and Fort-de-France mayor Aimé Césaire. However, the scene turned violent as the CRS authorities forcefully dispersed the crowd using truncheons and tear gas.

As the sixteen would now find it impossible to find work in the plantations, Césaire offered them positions in the municipal services of Fort-de-France.

The municipality of Basse-Pointe paid a compensation to the widow Berthe de Fabrique.

=== Aftermath ===
The trial highlighted the complicated racial and class inequalities and unfair working conditions that persisted in Martinique one hundred years after the abolition of slavery and two years after departmentalization.

Some saw the trial as an opportunity to hold France accountable, but the situation nevertheless remained tense in Martinique. Striking agricultural workers were the victims of police repression several additional times: a shooting at La Chassaing in 1951 (5 injured), at Lamentin in 1961 (3 deaths), and at the Chavet property in Basse-Pointe in 1974 (2 deaths).

== Documentary film ==
In 2008, Camille Mauduech produced a two-part documentary film about the trial entitled Les 16 de Basse-Pointe.
