= Jean de Menasce =

French Catholic priest and scholar (1902–1973)

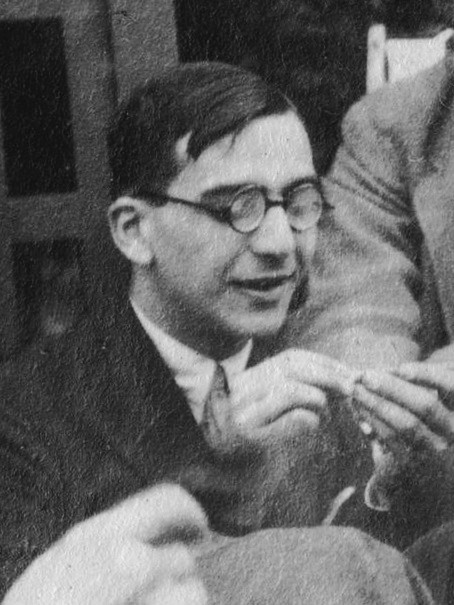
Photograph of Jean de Menasce by Lady Ottoline Morrell

Jean Cattaui de Menasce (1902–1973) was a French Catholic priest, of the Dominican Order, as well as an author and academic. He came from Jewish Egyptian and French parentage. Over his lifetime he mastered fifteen languages, including Hebrew, Syriac, and Pahlavi. He was in the Catholic contingent among Jewish and Protestant leaders at an important post-war interfaith conference. Menasce wrote as a theologian, and as a scholar of Middle Eastern studies, especially regarding Judaism, and the Zoroastrian religion.

== Early years ==
Jean de Menasce was born in Alexandria on 24 December 1902 into a well-established family in the Jewish community of Egypt. His father, Baron Félix de Menasce, a banker with Austro-Hungarian links, was head of the Jewish community in Alexandria; he had been raised to the peerage by the Emperor of Austria. Jean's mother was French from a Spanish line. A cousin of Jean de Menasce was the writer and diplomat Georges Cattaui, six years his senior. A second cousin was the composer and pianist Jacques de Menasce.

After the local lycée français, Jean de Menasce remained in Cairo studying at its French School of Law. Thereafter he continued his education in Europe, at Oxford University and at the Sorbonne. During the course of his student years, de Menasce had left behind his religious beliefs.

At Oxford's Balliol College, he was a classmate of the future novelist Graham Greene, who also would convert to Catholicism in 1926. Menasce translated into French works of the English poet T. S. Eliot, a friend. In 1922 he made the French translation of a book by the philosopher Bertrand Russell, whom he knew as a fellow member of Lady Ottoline Morrell's salon at Oxford. From the poetry of John Donne, the 17th-century Anglican priest, he had also made French versions. Thus he already enjoyed some recognition when in 1926 he became a convert to Catholicism.

== Conversion ==
In the meantime, de Menasce had continued to study law and philosophy at the Sorbonne in Paris. Then, while pursuing his interest in Zionism, Chaim Weizmann, a family friend and future President of Israel, appointed him secretary of the Zionist Bureau in Geneva. He then traveled to Jerusalem.

Returning to Paris, de Menasce entered a period of personal spiritual crisis, and painful growth. He began his lifelong friendship with the Catholic philosopher Jacques Maritain and his Jewish wife Raissa, both converts from agnosticism twenty years earlier. Another decisive new friend was Louis Massignon, a scholar whose 4-volume study of the Islamic mystic Al-Hallaj had just been published. Massignon, also a convert, had met de Menasce at the La Revue juive [The Jewish Review].

In this learned milieu, in an atmosphere of intense spiritual awareness, de Menasce converted. During his inquiring approach to Christianity with Massignon he had discussed the mystics Theresa of Avila and Francis of Assisi. He had also followed the modern naisance of Jewish-Christian dialogue. After his baptism he spent the first months writing his book on Hassidism, Quand Israel aime Dieu. According to Adrian Hastings:

The book was "an exceptionally beautiful study of Jewish Hasidic holiness. It was, in a way, his farewell tribute to the religion of his ancestors, but one feels that he was able to make it only after he had rediscovered the God of Israel through the discovery of Jesus as Messiah."

He then spent two years in Cairo at his father's request. In 1930 he entered the Dominican Order. His formation for the priesthood was conducted in Belgium at Le Saulchoir de Kain, and he was ordained in 1935.

== As scholar-priest ==
=== Roles in the Church ===
Following an earlier suggestion of Massignon, Fr. Jean de Menasce pursued studies in the Syriac language. It led him into the academic world of religious studies, eventually becoming a professor. "The relationship of Christianity to Judaism and Islam, and to all the great world religions was central to his missiology." Hence his scholarly affinity to the Islamists Massignon, Jean-Mohammed Abd-el-Jalil, and Louis Gardet, as well as Hendrik Kraemer. In this context de Menasce approached the theme of Catholic missions after the second world war. "The relationship of Christianity to Judaism and Islam, and to all the great world religions was central to his missiology."

The priest and professor exerted an important influence within the wide horizons of French Catholic intellectual life. De Menasce was a close friend of the art critic fr:Stanislas Fumet, of the essayist Charles Du Bos, and of the ill-fated writer Maurice Sachs, in addition to the above philosopher Jacques Maritain. Menasce also participated in the neo-Thomist revival within his Church, following Cardinal Charles Journet and Professor Maritain among others.

=== Jewish-Christian relations ===
De Menasce was continuously involved in fostering Jewish-Christian relations. He played a major role in its evolution during the painful yet persistently hopeful post-war years. During this period, de Menasce lectured on contemporary Jewish thought, e.g., that of philosopher Emmanuel Levinas.

He was one of nine Catholic participants among the seventy Jewish and Christian leaders at the Seelisberg Conference on the Shoah in 1947. This international religious gathering in Switzerland addressed the world of pain and grief left by the searing ideological conflict. Sponsored by the International Council of Christians and Jews (ICCJ), it faced antisemitism, seeking to heal wounds and to bridge divides, recent and ancient.

=== Zoroastrian studies ===
In Iranian studies de Menasce excelled. He became a recognized expert, a leader in the field. In the late 1930s he had studied with Émile Benveniste in Fribourg. During the war he prepared his translation of the Škand-Gumānīk Vičār by Mardan-Farrukk, a ninth century Zoroastrian. The book included transcriptions of the text in Pahlavi and in Pazand, a glossary, and his extensive annotations. He scrutinized the comparative theology of this polemical work, which consciously employs reason to criticize the monotheism of Jews, Christians, and Muslims. Each of its chapters is introduced, translated into French, and followed by commentary. The clarity of his language was remarkable. The book was dedicated to his teacher and friend, Professor Benveniste.

In 1947 the University of Paris invited him to give a series of seminars at the Sorbonne on the Zoroastrian texts, the Denkart. His work here was published in 1958. Menasce was a leader in investigating the epigraphy of the Sasanian Empire. With Henry Corbin and Gilbert Lazard he was a founder of the Association pour l'advancement de études iraniennes. His academic production on Zoroastrian subjects accumulated, including an article on imperial Sasanid law.

De Menasce illustrated points of convergence between Zoroastrian theological reasoning and the Muslim philosophic school of Mu'tazila, whereby the deity Allah would be understood as divorced from "all cause" [toute causalité] of evil in the world. He probed Augustine's period as a Manichean, a dualist religion derived in part from Zoroastrianism; Augustine later converted to Christianity and became a Church Father. His continued study of the Denkart eventually resulted in further seminars at the Sorbonne in 1962-1964, and the posthumous publication of his work on the Denkart's third book.

=== Publications and posts ===
The published works of de Menasce include books and articles on subjects including: theology, philosophy, law, history of religions, Zoroastrianism, and also Judaism, Zionism, and Hassidism. His reputation could rest on his translations alone, made into French from several different languages.

Starting in 1936 he had served as professor at the University of Fribourg in Switzerland. In 1939 in Paris he became research professor for the religions of ancient Iran. In 1945 de Menasce participated in founding the journal Nouvelle Revue de Science Missionaire/Neue Zeitschrift für Missionswissenschaft. 1954-1955, he taught at Harvard, and at Princeton, where he renewed his friendship with Jacques Maritain. From 1949 until 1970 he was Director of Studies at l'École pratique des hautes études in Paris; here an academic chair had been created especially for him.

== Death ==
A Muslim colleague said of him, "[H]e made possible a degree of communication amongst us that would have been much more difficult in his absence." After suffering strokes in 1959 and 1969, Father de Menasce died at the age of 70 in 1973.

== Bibliography ==
=== Selected publications ===
Books

- Quand Israël aime Dieu : Introduction au hassidisme, préface de Guy Monnot. Paris: Plon, 1931; Éditions du Cerf, 1992; Cerf, 2007.
- Arabische Philosophie. Bern: Francke, 1948.
- Une Encyclopédie mazdiénne, le Dēnkart, in journal of Bibliothèque de l'École Pratique des Hautes Études, Sciences Religieuses, LXIX, Paris 1958 (essay collection).
- Réflexions sur Zurvan. A locust's leg, 1962.
- Permanence et transformation de la mission, 1967 (his collected missiological essays, includes the rebuttal to Hendrik Kraemer).
- La Porte sur le Jardin, textes recueillis et présentés par Robert Rochefort, introduction du cardinal Charles Journet. Paris: Cerf, 1975.

Articles

- "Situation du sionisme", Chroniques, coll. « Roseau d'or » n° 5; Paris: Plon 1928, 53p.
- "Augustin manichéen" in Rychar & Boehlich, eds., Freudesgabe fũr Ernest Robert Curtius (Bern 1956).
- "Les religions de l'Iran et l'ancien Testament" (Louvain, c.1958).
- "Le temps, le démon et le doute, selon le Mazdéisme" at Musée Guimet, 8 March 1959.
- "Feux et fondations pieuses dans le droit sassanide", Paris: Klincksieck 1964, 62p.
- "Contemplative Life and Missions," IRM 56 (1967): 330-337.
- "Zoroastrian Pahlavi Writings" in Cambridge History of Iran, v. III/2 (1985), pp. 1161-1195.

Translations

- From English: Bertrand Russell, Mysticisme et logique, suivi d'autres essais, traduits de l'anglais, par Jean de Menasce (Paris: Payot 1922).
- From German: Max Scheler, L'homme du ressentiment (Paris 1933; Paris: Gallimard 1958).
- From Hebrew (collaboration): "Daniel" (Paris: Cerf 1954); included in La Bible de Jérusalem (Paris: Cerf 1956).
- From Pahlavi:
  - Mardan-Farrukh, Škand-Gumānīk Vičār. La solution décisive des doutes. Une apologétique Mazdéenne du IXe siècle (Fribourg en Suisse: Librairie de l'Université 1945).
  - Artupat i Emetan, Le Troisième Livre du Dēnkart (Paris: Klincksieck [1973] 1984), with Extraits en ligne.

=== Criticism, commentary ===
Books

- Ph. Gignoux et A. Tafazzoli, editors, Mémorial Jean de Menasce, Louvain: Impremerie orientaliste, 1974 [festschrift]
  - Dominique Avon, Les Frères prêcheurs en Orient : Les dominicains du Caire (années 1910 - années 1960). Paris: Cerf/Histoire, 2005, with Extraits en ligne
  - fr:Philippe Chenaux, Entre Maurras et Maritain : Une génération intellectuelle catholique (1920-1930). Paris: Éditions du Cerf, 1999
  - Frédéric Gugelot, La Conversion des intellectuels au catholicisme en France, 1885-1935, Paris: CNRS Éditions, 1998
  - Michael Haag, Alexandria: City of Memory. London and New Haven: Yale U P, 2004. [Includes extensive biographical material on the Menasce family including Jean de Menasce.]

Articles

- R. Curiel, « En souvenir de Jean de Menasce (1902-1973) », Studia Iranica Chauvigny, 1978, vol. 7, n° 2
- Ph. Gignoux et A. Tafazzoli, "J. P. de Menasce 1902-1973 Biographie" in Mémorial Jean de Menasce, Louvain, 1974, pp. vii-xv
- Philippe Gignoux, "Menasce, Jean Pierre de" in Encyclopaedia Iranica (2014)
- Adrian Hastings, "The Legacy of Pierre Jean de Menasce", IBMR 21 (October 1997).
- G. Lazard, « Jean de Menasce (1902-1973) », Journal asiatique, 1974, vol. 262 n° 3-4
- Anaël Levy, "Jean de Menasce: juif, sioniste, prétre. De la Renaissance juive au dialogue judéo-chrétien" (2010).
- V. Python, "L'oeuvre du P. de Menasce OP (1902-1973) sur les missions et le mazdéisme," NZM 30 (1974): 161 - 172.
- Jean-Michel Roessli (dir.), « Jean de Menasce, 1902-1973 », Fribourg (Suisse), Bibliothèque cantonale et universitaire, 1998
- Marc R. Spindler, "Menasce, Pierre Jean de 1902-1973 Catholic (Dominican) Egypt" in Dictionary of African Christian Biography.
  - Éditions du Cerf, "Jean de Menasce (1902-1973) 20e siècle".
  - GoldenMap.com, "Jean de Menasce".

== Reference notes ==
The initial version of this article was translated in July 2012 from French Wikipedia: fr:Jean de Menasce.
