= Zandaqa =

Individuals who identify as Muslim but reject at least one of the tenets of Islam

Zindīq (pl. zanādiqa) is an Islamic pejorative applied to individuals who are considered to hold views or follow practices that are contrary to central Islamic dogma. Zandaqa is the noun describing these views.

Zandaqa is usually translated as "heresy" and is often used to underscore the seriousness of the religious views of the accused individual, and the rejection of such views by Islamic orthodoxy. It originally referred to the adherents of Manichaeism, but then came to be applied to those who were accused of having heretical beliefs and actions deemed as threatening by Islamic authorities.

== Under the Abbasids ==
The Arabic zindīq is a loan word from pre-Islamic Middle Persian 𐭦𐭭𐭣𐭩𐭪 zandik, a Zoroastrian term of uncertain etymology and meaning (for a discussion of the term in a pre-Islamic context, see zandik).

Zindīq (زنديق) or Zandik (𐭦𐭭𐭣𐭩𐭪) was initially used to negatively denote the followers of the Manichaeism religion in the Sasanian Empire. By the time of the eighth-century Abbasid Caliphate however, the meaning of the word zindīq and the adjectival zandaqa had broadened and could loosely denote many things: Gnostic Dualists as well as followers of Manichaeism, agnostics, and atheists. However, many of those persecuted for zandaqa under the Abbasids claimed to be Muslims, and when applied to Muslims, the accusation was that the accused secretly harbored Manichaean beliefs. "The proof for such an accusation was sought, if at all, in an indication of some kind of dualism, or if that individual openly flouted Islamic beliefs or practices." As such, certain Muslim poets of early Abbasid times could thus also be accused of zandaqa as much as an actual Manichaean might.

The charge of zandaqa was a serious one, and could cost the accused their life. A history of the time states cites the first Abbasid caliph Abu al-'Abbas As-Saffah as having said "tolerance is laudable, except in matters dangerous to religious belief, or to the sovereign's dignity." The third Abbasid caliph, Al-Mahdi, ordered the composition of polemical works to refute freethinkers and other heretics, and for years he tried to exterminate them absolutely, hunting them down and exterminating freethinkers in large numbers, putting to death anyone on mere suspicion of being a zindiq. Al-Mahdi's successors, the caliphs al-Hadi and Harun al-Rashid, continued the pogroms, although with diminished intensity during the reign of the latter and was later abolished by him. This policy in turn influenced the Mihna policy of al-Ma'mun which targeted those Muslim religious scholars and officials who refused to accept the doctrine of created nature of Quran.

The reason for these persecutions are not easy to determine. Zandaqa was viewed as a threat to Islam, to Muslim society, and to the state. In the eighth century, Islamic norms were still under development and had not yet crystallized, and Muslims were still a small minority in the vast territories ruled by the caliphate, and even those who had converted were perceived to have been only "imperfectly" Islamized. Many of these converts had previously been Manichaeans, and Manichaeaism with its well developed missionary ideals had undergone a slight resurgence during early caliphate rule. As such, the Manichaeans were perceived as a threat to the security of the Muslim religious elite and to the Abbasid state. The threat was perceived to be especially evident in the quasi-scientific manner in which the Manichaeans posed unsettling questions, their skill at creating a favourable impression in public debate, and their ability in defending their own intellectually-appealing world-view.

== Later usage ==
In time, Muslim theologians came to apply zindiq to "the criminal dissident—the professing Muslim who holds beliefs or follows practices contrary to the central beliefs of Islam and is therefore to be regarded as an apostate and an infidel. The jurists differ as to the theoretical formulation of the point of exclusion, but in fact usually adopt the practical criterion of open rebellion."

In modern times, the term zindiq is occasionally used to denote members of religions, sects or cults that originated in a Muslim society but are considered heretical or independent faiths by mainstream Muslims. In this sense, a zindiq is perceived to be incorrigibly disloyal to the tenets of Islam.

== See also ==
- Al-Baqara 256 "there is no compulsion in religion"
- Persecution of minority Muslim groups
