= Seelisberg Conference =

Conference on anti-Semitism (1947)

The Seelisberg Conference, officially the International Emergency Conference on Anti-Semitism took place at Seelisberg in Central Switzerland from 30 July to 5 August 1947. The Conference was the Second Conference of the International Council of Christians and Jews (ICCJ).

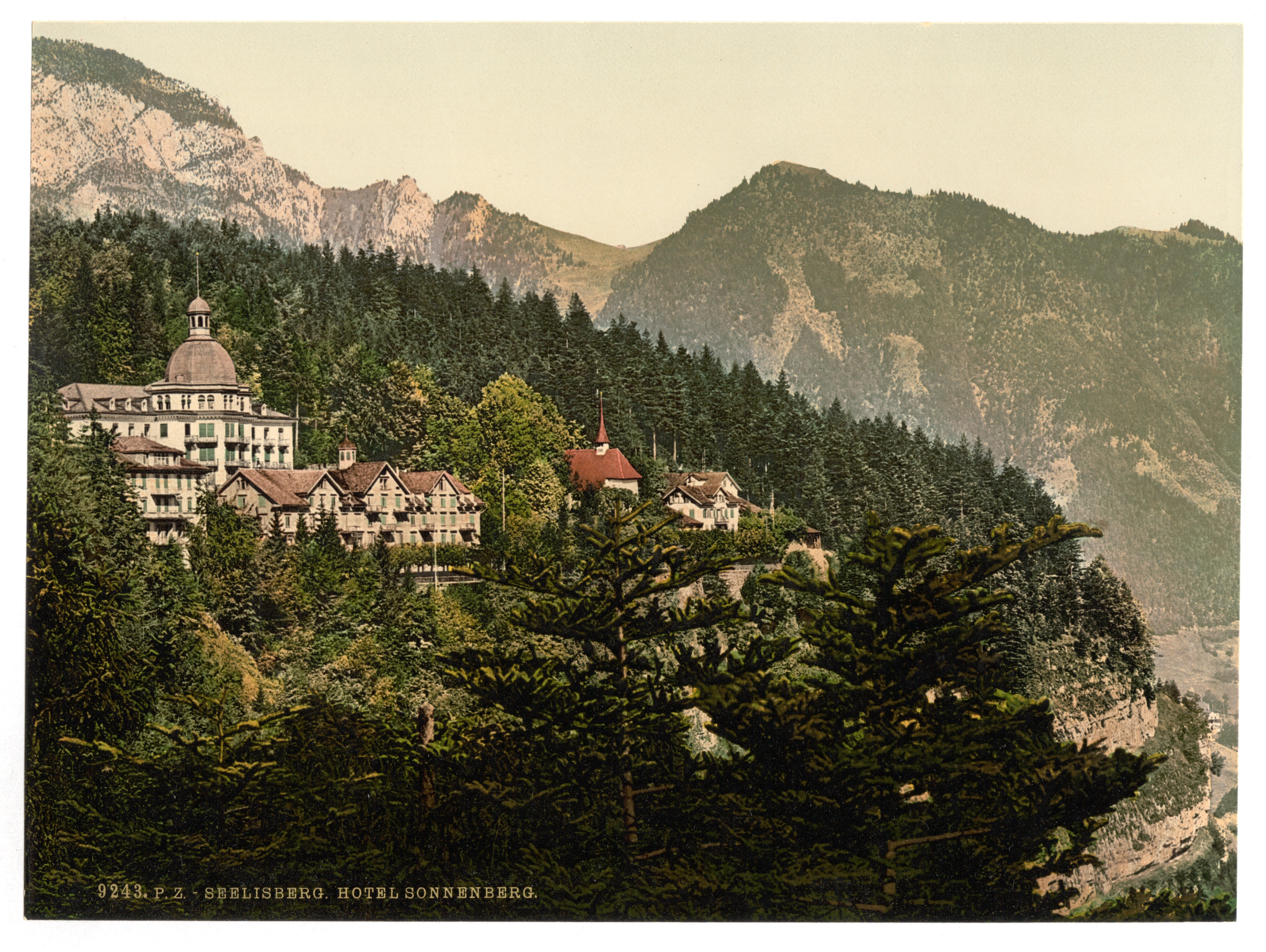
Seelisberg: Hotel Sonnenberg

Its agenda included finding reasons for the anti-Semitism which existed even after World War II and developing measures to combat it.

== Participants ==
The Conference was composed of 63 participants and 2 observers from twelve nations, comprising Jews and Christians (both Protestant and Roman Catholic, both clergy and laity). Participants were invited because they would be able to contribute to the theme of Anti-Semitism in a “substantive manner.”

The 63 participants included “presidents of national Jewish-Christian organizations,” representatives of the World Council of Churches and the Roman Catholic German Bishops' Conference, professors from Sofia University and the University of Fribourg. Jules Isaac, the French historian of Jewish descent, was a significant protagonist at the Conference. Willard E. Goslin, from the Reformed Church tradition and active in the American educational system, presided over the Conference. He was assisted by the British Jew, Neville Laski.

The two professors from the University of Fribourg were Professor for Missiology and Comparative Religions Jean de Menasce and Professor of Systematic Theology Charles Journet.

== Agenda ==
The agenda of the Conference was as follows:

1. “First: an inventory of current anti-Semitism in various European countries and the disclosure of the reasons for its continuation and increase even after the war.”
2. “Second: the development of practical measures to combat anti-Semitism at all levels of society, through short-term strategies or by long-term measures which would obstruct its re-emergence.”
3. “Third: a contribution to the healing of the Jewish-Christian relationship was to be begun.”

== Commissions ==
The Conference was divided into five commissions. At the end of the Conference each commission presented its final report to the entire conference for approval.

Commission III dealt with The Role of the Churches and produced the 10 Points of Seelisberg that are found in the next section. The Conference recognized that the work of Commission III was “a particularly difficult task as well as one of great historic importance” because “over the centuries, Christian anti-Judaism had established a culture of contempt against the Jews.” Commission III said that its membership of “Catholics, Protestants and Jews aimed to work with candor and cordiality.” It was the “first involvement in an ecumenical and interreligious working group” for some members of the Commission.

At the end of the Conference, when Commission III presented its document, it was affirmed “without any discussion,” The document included the Ten Points of Seelisberg. However, they were not published until later after they had “been submitted to the respective ecclesial authorities.”

The Seelisberg conference stands out because of the Ten Points of Seelisberg it produced. These Ten Points are a “lasting foundation stone for theological dialogue between Jews and Christians.”

== The 10 Points of Seelisberg ==
In the Ten Points of Seelisberg as part of An Address to the Churches, Christians in dialogue with Jews began to come to terms with the implications of the Shoah. The Ten Points of Seelisberg follow:

AN ADDRESS TO THE CHURCHES
SEELISBERG (Switzerland), 1947

We have recently witnessed an outburst of antisemitism which has led to the persecution and extermination of millions of Jews. In spite of the catastrophe which has overtaken both the persecuted and the persecutors, and which has revealed the extent of the Jewish problem in all its alarming gravity and urgency, antisemitism has lost none of its force, but threatens to extend to other regions, to poison the minds of Christians and to involve humanity more and more in a grave guilt with disastrous consequences.

The Christian Churches have indeed always affirmed the un-Christian character of antisemitism, as of all forms of racial hatred, but this has not sufficed to prevent the manifestation among Christians, in various forms, of an undiscriminating racial hatred of the Jews as a people.

This would have been impossible if all Christians had been true to the teaching of Jesus Christ on the mercy of God and love of one’s neighbour. But this faithfulness should also involve clear-sighted willingness to avoid any presentation and conception of the Christian message which would support antisemitism under whatever form. We must recognise, unfortunately, that this vigilant willingness has often been lacking.

We therefore address ourselves to the Churches to draw their attention to this alarming situation. We have the firm hope that they will be concerned to show their members how to prevent any animosity towards the Jews which might arise from false, inadequate or mistaken presentations or conceptions of the teaching and preaching of the Christian doctrine, and how on the other hand to promote brotherly love towards the sorely-tried people of the old covenant. Nothing would seem more calculated to contribute to this happy result than the following:

TEN POINTS

1. Remember that One God speaks to us all through the Old and the New Testaments. (See divine simplicity and monotheism.)
2. Remember that Jesus was born of a Jewish mother of the seed of David and the people of Israel, and that His everlasting love and forgiveness embraces His own people and the whole world. (See Dual-covenant theology and Judaism's view of Jesus.)
3. Remember that the first disciples, the apostles and the first martyrs were Jews. (See Apostle (Christian).)
4. Remember that the fundamental commandment of Christianity, to love God and one's neighbour, proclaimed already in the Old Testament and confirmed by Jesus, is binding upon both Christians and Jews in all human relationships, without any exception. (See Ethic of reciprocity.)
5. Avoid distorting or misrepresenting biblical or post-biblical Judaism with the object of extolling Christianity. (See legalism and pharisees.)
6. Avoid using the word Jews in the exclusive sense of the enemies of Jesus, and the words "the enemies of Jesus" to designate the whole Jewish people. (See Jew (disambiguation).)
7. Avoid presenting the Passion in such a way as to bring the odium of the killing of Jesus upon all Jews or upon Jews alone. It was only a section of the Jews in Jerusalem who demanded the death of Jesus, and the Christian message has always been that it was the sins of mankind which were exemplified by those Jews and the sins in which all men share that brought Christ to the Cross. (See Passion play and deicide.)
8. Avoid referring to the scriptural curses, or the cry of a raging mob: "His blood be upon us and our children," without remembering that this cry should not count against the infinitely more weighty words of our Lord: "Father forgive them for they know not what they do." (See blood curse.)
9. Avoid promoting the superstitious notion that the Jewish people are reprobate, accursed, reserved for a destiny of suffering. (See Wandering Jew.)
10. Avoid speaking of the Jews as if the first members of the Church had not been Jews. (See Council of Jerusalem.)

== Evaluation and impact ==
An Address to the Churches was “unique in that it was formulated by a mixed group of Jewish and Christian theologians.” Also, “it directly addressed the issue of antisemitism by specifying a number of Christian doctrines that lent support to anti-Jewish hostility.” Yet, “despite its sophistication,” An Address to the Churches “remained little known and produced no immediate impact.”
