= MRAP (organization) =

French NGO

The Mouvement contre le racisme et pour l'amitié entre les peuples (MRAP; Movement Against Racism and for Friendship between Peoples) is a French NGO which describes itself as anti-racist. It was founded in 1949.

== Origins and name changes ==
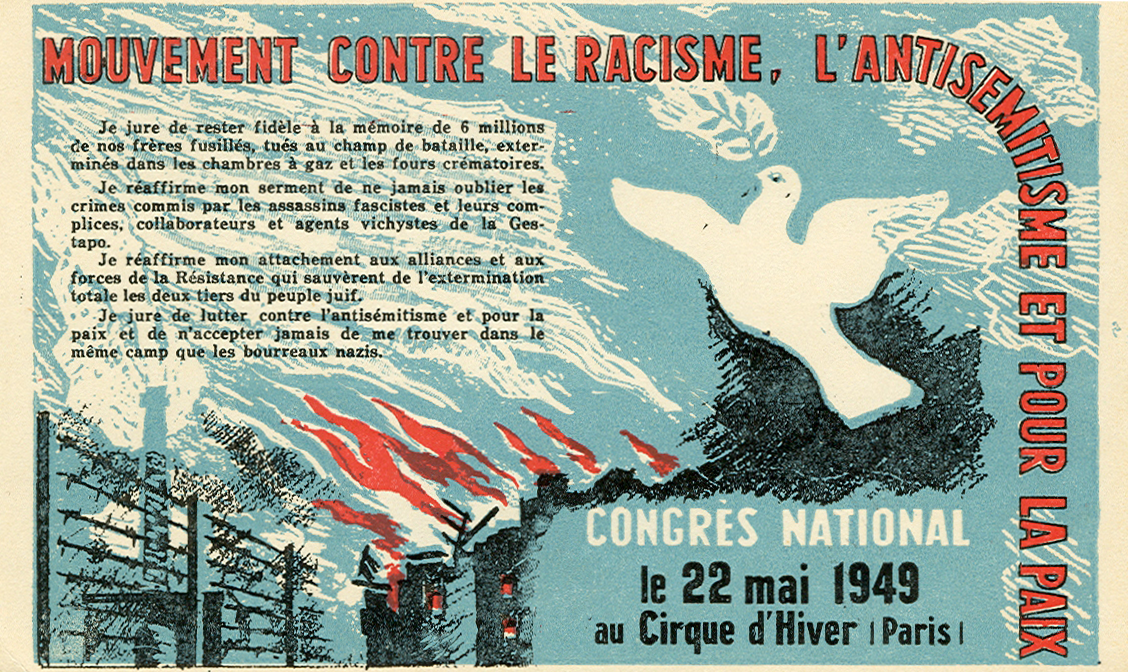
Flier for the creation of the MRAP in 1949.

In 1941, the Mouvement national contre le racisme (MNCR, the "National Movement Against Racism") was created by several members of the French Resistance who believed that a specific struggle against racism was a crucial part of France's liberation from German occupation. One of their primary goals was to save as many Jewish children as possible from deportation. The movement coordinated its actions with the Protestant and Catholic Church. Two clandestine newspapers, J'accuse in the North zone and Fraternité in the South zone, were established to counter the racist ideology of the Nazis and the Vichy state.

On May 22, 1949, several MNCR members, including the painter Marc Chagall and the Social Catholic leader Marc Sangnier, created the Mouvement contre le racisme, l'antisémitisme et pour la paix (Movement Against Racism, Anti-Semitism and for Peace). The group emphasized the role of anti-racism within their larger critique of neo-nazism, antisemitism, and the larger Cold War.

The group was renamed the Mouvement contre le Racisme et pour l'Amitié entre les Peuples in 1972, the name it is still known as today.

== Postwar activism ==
After WWII, the MRAP targeted its anti-racist activism to support anti-colonialism within the ongoing French wars of decolonization. They opposed the Algerian War (1954–62) and were one of the few organizations to condemn the methods of the police prefect Maurice Papon and the Paris massacre of 1961.

In 1951, the group advocated in support of sixteen accused Martinican sugar cane cutters during the unsolved French criminal case known as the Affaire des 16 de Basse Pointe.

The MRAP also critiqued the nature of the French economy's dependence on immigrant labor during the period of economic growth known as the Trente Glorieuses (1945 to 1974).

On January 6, 1956, at the Hôtel Lutetia in Paris, the MRAP award was given to Jules Isaac to recognize the “great impact” against antisemitism made by Isaac's two books Jésus et Israël (Jesus and Israel) and Genèse de l'antisémitisme (Genesis of Antisemitism).

The MRAP supported the Pleven Act of July 1, 1972, which condemns incitations to racial hate and permits anti-racist associations to depose court suits against those who commit such hate speech.

The MRAP was also engaged in international issues. It was active against apartheid in South Africa and within the struggle against racism in the United States (in particular by defending Black Panthers member Mumia Abu-Jamal).

== Recent activities ==
Mouloud Aounit was its first general secretary (1989–2004), then president (2004–2008), then member of the presidential college (2008–2011) not to belong to the French Communist Party (PCF).

Despite dropping the term from its name in 1972, the MRAP continues to be engaged against antisemitism. They group also defends the rights of immigrants, Romani peoples, and other victims of racism. It is also engaged in actions against the right and far right. Currently, it concentrates its action against immigration-restricting laws and in favor of immigrants' rights, as well as denunciation of racism on the internet and against historical revisionism (courtsuit deposed against Bruno Gollnisch, member of the Front National).

In some cases, it has also criticized the Socialist Party, criticizing Ségolène Royal, the Socialist contender for the 2007 presidential election, when she released her program on security issues, stating that she was engaging in the "most dangerous kind of populism".

The MRAP was engaged in the creation of the alter-globalization NGO ATTAC in 1998.

=== Opposition to genetic studies ===
The organization has voiced opposition to genetic studies being carried out in France, following advances in science and the discovery of DNA which now allows scientists to identify which Y-haplogroup a person or group belongs to. In the summer of 2015, a group of British scientists from the University of Leicester wished to study the DNA of around a hundred local volunteers from the Cotentin Peninsula in Normandy, to find out “the intensity of the Scandinavian colonisation” from the 9th century Viking invasions. Despite the French state agreeing to this, MRAP and local member Jacques Declosmenil attempted to obstruct the scientific study, saying that the scientific results "will build on the idea that there are real Normans and fake Normans."

== Image gallery ==
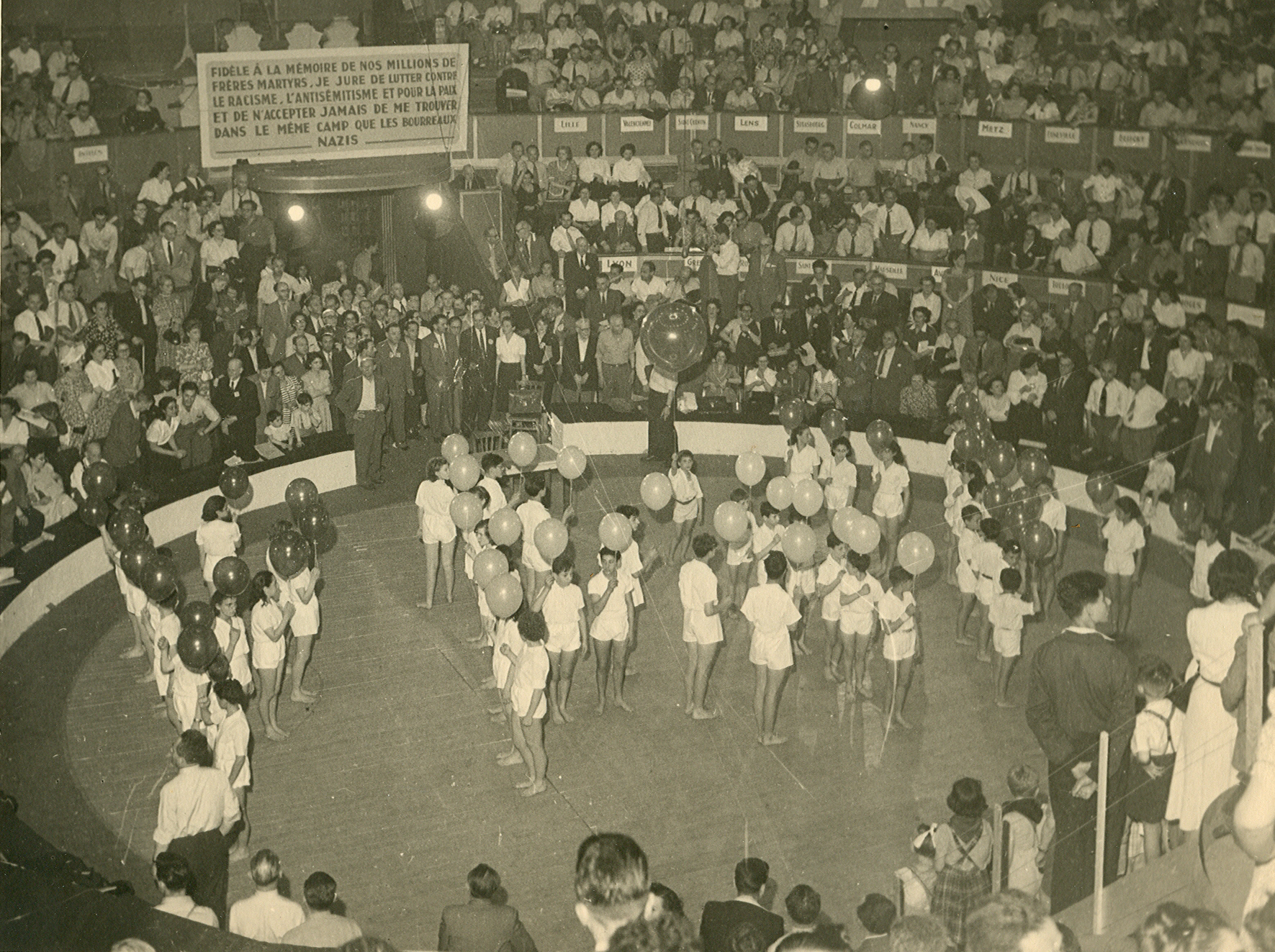
Opening gala for the first MRAP Congress (1949).

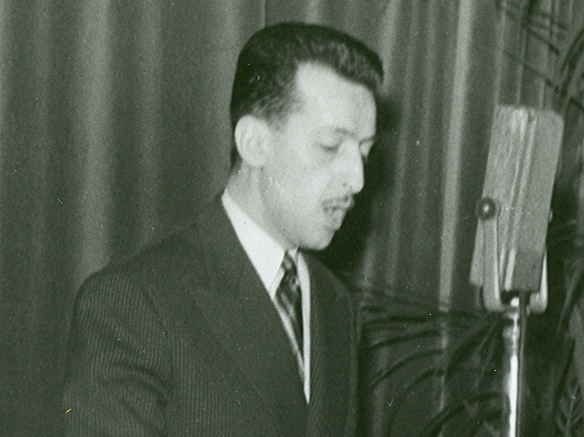
Charles Palant (1949), former chairman of the Youth committee of LICRA, who became one of the founders of MRAP in 1949, and its General Secretary from 1950 to 1971.

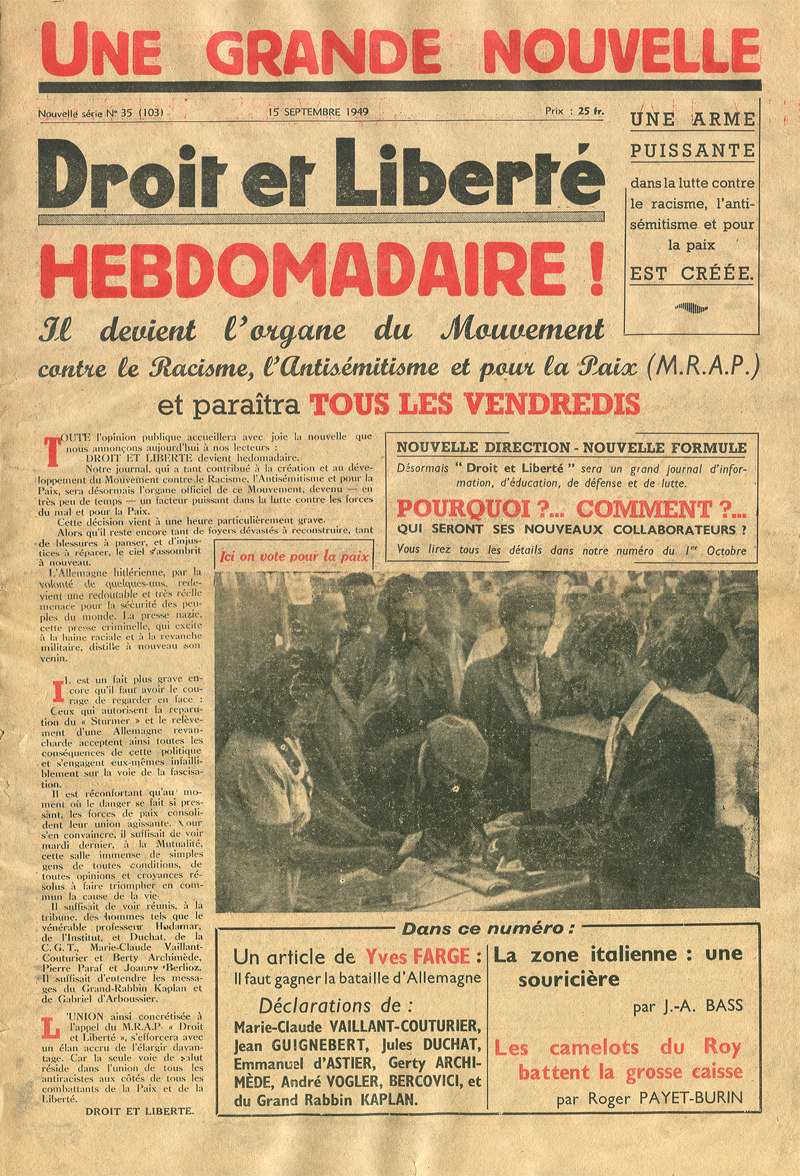
On September 19, 1949, the newspaper Droit et Liberté (Right and Freedom) becomes the propaganda organ of MRAP.

== See also ==
- France in the twentieth century
- Human rights in France
