= Zandik =

Zoroastrian term conventionally interpreted as heretic

Zandik (Middle Persian: 𐭦𐭭𐭣𐭩𐭪) is a Zoroastrian term conventionally interpreted as heretic in a narrow sense, or, in a wider sense, for a person with any belief or practice that ran contrary to Sassanid-mediated Zoroastrian orthodoxy.

The Middle Persian term engendered the better-attested Arabic زنديق zindiq, with the same semantic field but related to Islam rather than Zoroastrianism. In the Islamic world, including Islamic-era Iran, the term was also variously assigned to Manichaeans, Mandaeans, Mazdakites, Zoroastrians, Buddhists, Christians, and free-thinkers in general, including Muslims. Whether zandik was also used in any of these ways in Zoroastrian times is unknown; in that context, the term is only attested in three texts (two from the same author), and in all three appears as a hapax legomenon used in a pejorative way, but with no additional hints from which to infer a meaning.

In several now-obsolete studies related to Zoroastrianism, the word was also speculated to be the proper name of a particular (but hypothetical) priestly tradition that embraced Zurvanite doctrine.

== Lexicology ==
The conventional translation as 'heretic' was already common in the 19th century when Christian Bartholomae (1885), derived zandik from Avestan zanda, which he treated as a name of certain heretics.

Zindīq (زنديق) or Zandik (𐭦𐭭𐭣𐭩𐭪) was initially used to negatively denote the followers of the Manichaeism religion in the Sasanian Empire. By the time of the 8th-century Abbasid Caliphate, however, the meaning of the word zindīq and the adjectival zandaqa had broadened and could loosely denote many things: Gnostic Dualists as well as followers of Manichaeism, Agnostics & Atheists. Early examples of Arabic zindiq denoting Manichaeans, and this possibly being the meaning of the term in the early attested use in Middle Persian (see below), led A. A. Bevan^{apud} to derive Middle Persian zandik from Syriac zaddiq 'righteous' as a Manichaean technical term for 'listeners' (i.e. lay persons, as contradistinguished from the Manichaean elite). Bevan's derivation was widely accepted until the 1930s, especially amongst scholars of Semitic languages, but was discredited following a comprehensive review of both Arabic and Iranian usage by H. H. Schaeder (1930). Schaeder pointed out that the substantive was zand, not zandik (an etymology would thus have to explain zand, not zandik), as -ik was merely a regular Middle Iranian adjectivizing suffix.

An alternative interpretation that explains both 'Manichaean' and 'heretic' derives the substantive in zandik from Avestan 𐬰𐬀𐬥 zan 'to know, to explain', which is also the origin of Middle Persian 'zand' (a class of exegetical commentaries) and 'Pazand' (a writing system). In this explanation, the term zandik came to be applied to anyone who gave greater weight to human interpretation than to scripture (perceived to be divinely transmitted). Prior to Schaeder's review, the term was commonly assumed to first explain 'Manichaean', and to then have developed a meaning of 'heretic' as a secondary development. In that model, the term referred to Manichaeans because of their disposition to interpret and explain the scriptures of other religions in accordance with their own ideas.

== In inscriptions ==
Under the Sassanids (224-651 CE), the previously informal indigenous Iranian religious tradition now known as 'Zoroastrianism' was mediated and formalized into the systemized configuration with which it survives today. The Denkard, a 9th-11th century work of Zoroastrian tradition, attributes this systemization of doctrine—in which certain beliefs and traditions were seen as definite while others were considered unacceptable—to an initiative by Tansar, high priest under Ardashir I, the founder of the dynasty. The development of a particular orthodoxy is also indicated by other sources, such as the Letter of Tansar, which additionally suggests that the systemization of the Zoroastrian church was part of a greater state-sponsored "revival" of Iranian values, apparently as a Sassanian reaction to the perceived cultural "corruptions" of the preceding (likewise Iranian, but Hellenistic) Arsacid Parthian dynasts.

The Arsacids were probably not as culturally "un-Iranian" as Tansar's/Ardashir's propagandistic justification to overthrow them indicates, and it isn't even clear whether the systemization had any effect on the general populace in Sassanid times itself (or whether this first occurred in the post-Sassanian period). However, literary and epigraphic evidence from the third century onwards indicates that Sassanid-era priests in positions of authority persecuted individuals who held beliefs that were in not in accord with their (Sassanid-mediated) brand of Zoroastrianism. Among this epigraphic evidence are the 3rd/4th-century inscriptions of Kartir, Tansar's successor and high priest under three of Ardashir I's successors. In his own inscription on the Ka'ba-ye Zartosht, Kartir states (KKZ 8–9) that he persecuted "Jews, Buddhists, Brahmins, Nasoreans (Judeo-Christians), Christians, 'Maktaks' (Mandaeans, Manichaeans?) and zandiks." Kartir's inscription is the earliest epigraphic evidence of the word zandik.

Although the precise meaning of zandik is not evident from Kartir's use of the term, it is commonly assumed to mean 'heretic', or 'unorthodox' in relation to Kartir's ideology.^{cf.} However, none of Kartir's inscriptions actually define the contents of his orthodoxy. From this inscription and another at Sar Mashad, it appears that the only doctrine that Kartir was concerned with was the belief in a hereafter, a heaven and a hell, with one or the other as the final destination of the soul as reward or punishment for deeds in this life. Nonetheless, in 1920s-1960s scholarship, Kartir's silence on the subject precipitated an ex silencio view that the 'heresy' in question must have been Zurvanism, a now-extinct branch of Zoroastrianism influenced by Hellenistic and/or Babylonian notions of the hereafter. The word zandik was even speculated to be the proper name of a particular (unattested) priestly school that embraced Zurvanite doctrine, to which a number of unappealing aspects of Zoroastrian religious praxis were then attributed. Modern Iranian scholarship is much less inclined to wild speculation, and these hypothetical constructs are no longer followed today.

Noticeably absent from Kartir's list is any immediately identifiable mention of Manichaeans, who were intermittently persecuted by the Sassanid establishment, also by Kartir, who is explicitly named as one of Mani's persecutor's in Manichaean sources. There are three suggested reasons to explain this anomaly: a) The conventional view is that Kartir includes them under the term 'Maktak'; b) an alternate position is that Kartir's text dates from the early period of Bahram I's rule when Mani still had Shapur I's and Hormizd I's protection; c) the third view is that Manichaeans are included in 'zandik'.

== In tradition ==
The term zandik appears once in the 9th/10th-century texts of Zoroastrian tradition (the so-called Pahlavi books). In this one instance, in Daedestan i Menog-i Khrad 36.16, the term appears as an abstract noun ('zandikih') and is explained to be the thirteenth most heinous crime.
