= Albert Malet (historian) =

French historian

Albert Malet (3 May 1864, Clermont-Ferrand – 25 September 1915, Battle of Thélus, Pas de Calais) was a French historian and writer of scholarly textbooks, killed during the First World War.

== Career ==
Malet failed the entrance exam at Saint-Cyr, However, in 1889 he passed the Aggregation of History and Geography.

=== Teacher ===
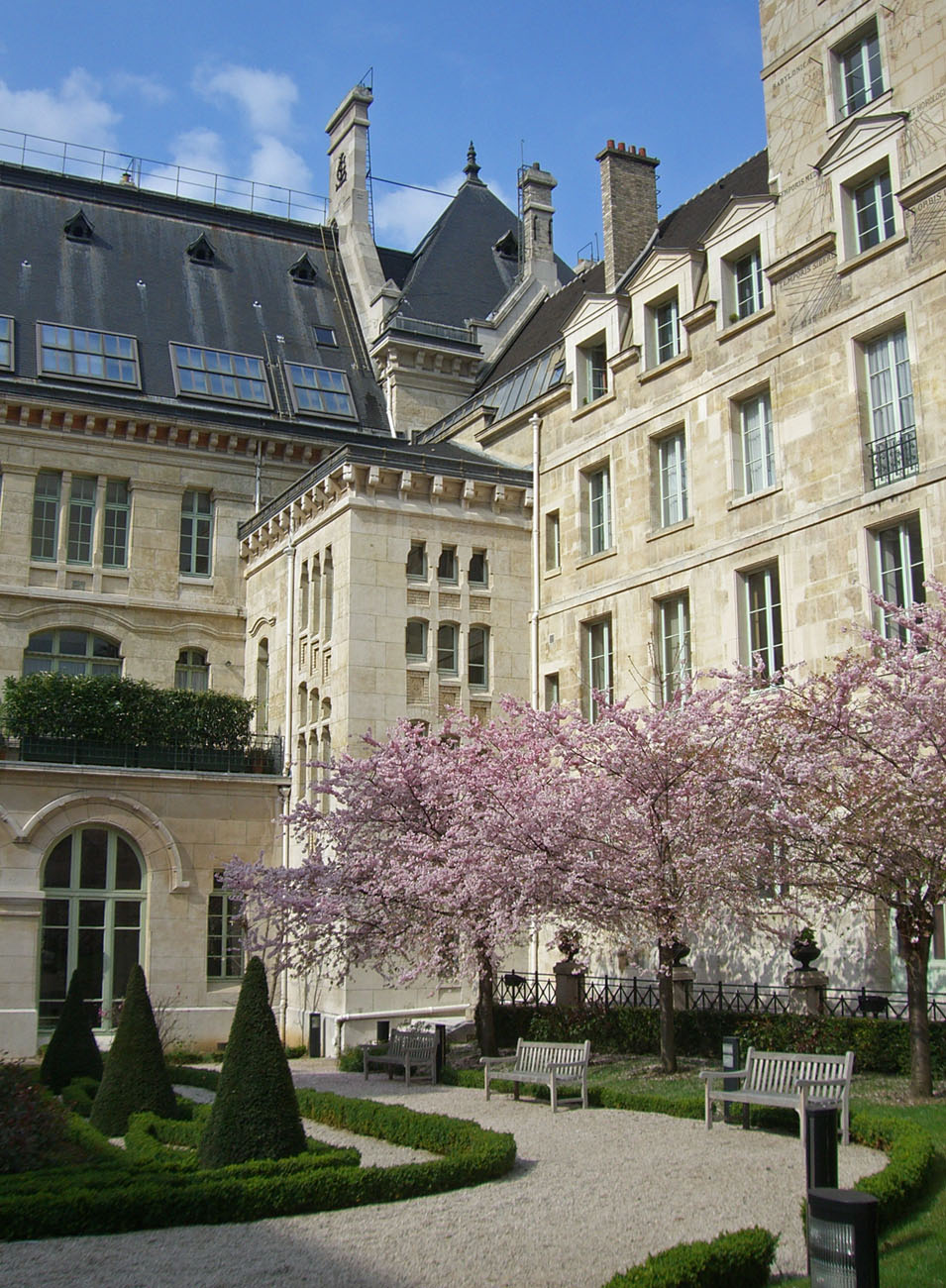
Cour d'Honneur (Main Courtyard) of Lycée Louis-le-Grand where Malet taught

Malet began teaching in Paris as "professeur agrégé d'histoire" (Associate Professor of History) at the lycée Voltaire in 1897.

Malet was one of the founding members and served as Secretary and on the Board of the Société d’Histoire de la Révolution in 1904.

In 1914, Malet became a teacher at the Lycée Louis-le-Grand.

In French high schools "exceptional importance [was] given to the teaching of history" courses which were required. The courses were "taught by specialized teachers, who numbered 620 in 1914". Malet was one of this number. However, he not only taught history he wrote about history.

=== Writer ===
Malet contributed to the Histoire Générale du I’VE siècle à nos jours (General History of the Fourth Century to the Present Day) in twelve volumes, edited by Ernest Lavisse and published from 1893 to 1904.

Malet wrote many history texts for the Hachette Book Group. One of Malet's texts was considered the "classic text" on French history. The classic text was Nouvelle histoire de France: l'Antiquité, le Moyen âge, les Temps modernes, la Révolution, l'Empire, la France contemporaine (New history of France: Antiquity, the Middle Ages, modern times, the Revolution, the Empire, contemporary France).

After the World War I and Malet's death in it, Jules Isaac expanded and updated Malet's history by "adding a chapter of 100 pages as a separate volume on the history of the war". Malet was named as the coauthor of Isaac's revision. To reflect Isaac's addition, the title of the text was changed to Nouvelle histoire de France: l'Antiquité, le Moyen âge, les Temps modernes, la Révolution, l'Empire, la France contemporaine, la Grande Guerre (New history of France: Antiquity, the Middle Ages, modern times, the Revolution, the Empire, contemporary France, the Great War).

Malet's other history texts are named Malet, Albert (1864–1915) in French and can be translated into English by Google.

== World War I ==
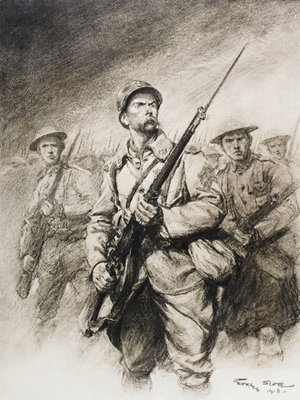
French soldiers in World War I

Malet was "above the age of active duty" to be mobilized but he volunteered when the Great War began in 1914 to be mobilised, he joined up as a volunteer. Malet has been described as a "patriotic revanchard” (revanchist).

=== Death ===
In the war, Malet served as a lieutenant in the 8th Company of the 3rd Battalion of the Reserve 163rd Infantry Regiment. He was killed in the Artois offensive, in making an attack on Thélus on 25 September 1915.

The battle on 25 September 1915, was a "marked success". Two men stood out for their "acts of bravery". One was Lieutenant Malet.

== Works ==
Malet published history text books for use in upper primary and secondary French schools. All of his works are listed on Malet, Albert (1864–1915).
